= 2007–08 Yeovil Town F.C. season =

Yeovil Town
2007–08 season
- Manager: Russell Slade
- Stadium: Huish Park
- League One: 18th
- FA Cup: First round
- Football League Cup: First round
- Johnstones Paint Trophy: Southern Quarter Final

This page shows the progress of Yeovil Town F.C. in the 2007–08 football season. During the season, Yeovil Town competed in League One in the English league system.

== League table ==
Pos	Team	Pld	W	D	L	GF	GA	GD	Pts
16	Bristol Rovers	46	12	17	17	45	53	−8	53
17	Millwall	46	14	10	22	45	61	−16	52
18	Yeovil Town	46	14	10	22	38	59	−21	52
19	Cheltenham Town	46	13	12	21	42	64	−22	51
20	Crewe Alexandra	46	12	14	20	47	65	−18	50

Updated to match(es) played on 3 May 2008. Source: The Football League
Rules for classification: 1) points; 2) goal difference; 3) number of goals scored.

== Results ==
=== Football League One ===
11 August 2007 1	Huddersfield Town	1–0	Yeovil Town	Huddersfield
	Beckett 17'			Stadium: Galpharm Stadium; Attendance: 9,876

18 August 2007 2	Yeovil Town	1–0	Port Vale	Yeovil
	Cochrane 17'			Stadium: Huish Park; Attendance: 5,071

25 August 2007 3	Northampton Town	1–2	Yeovil Town	Northampton
	Hübertz 32'		Cochrane 26'; Owusu 90'	Stadium: Sixfields; Attendance: 4,555

1 September 2007 4	Yeovil Town	1–1	Tranmere Rovers	Yeovil
	Stewart 57'		Davies 90'	Stadium: Huish Park; Attendance: 4,985

9 September 2007 5	Swindon Town	0–1	Yeovil Town	Swindon
			Owusu 77'	Stadium: County Ground; Attendance: 6,944

15 September 2007 6	Yeovil Town	0–1	Leyton Orient	Yeovil
			Boyd 57'	Stadium: Huish Park; Attendance: 5,217

22 September 2007 7	Brighton & Hove Albion	1–2	Yeovil Town	Brighton
	Hammond 61' (pen.)		Owusu 15'; Warne 43'	Stadium: Withdean Stadium; Attendance: 5,231

29 September 2007 8	Yeovil Town	0–3	Nottingham Forest	Yeovil
			Chambers 57'; Agogo 79'; Commons 84'	Stadium: Huish Park; Attendance: 6,818

2 October 2007 9	Yeovil Town	0–0	Luton Town	Yeovil
				Stadium: Huish Park; Attendance: 4,848

6 October 2007 10	Leeds United	1–0	Yeovil Town	Leeds
	de Vries 89'			Stadium: Elland Road; Attendance: 27,808

13 October 2007 11	Yeovil Town	2–1	Carlisle United	Yeovil
	Owusu 54'; Jones 65'		Hackney 49'	Stadium: Huish Park; Attendance: 4,757

20 October 2007 12	Bristol Rovers	1–1	Yeovil Town	Bristol
	Elliott 90'		Rose 62'	Stadium: Memorial Stadium; Attendance: 7,726

27 October 2007 13	Yeovil Town	1–2	Swansea City	Yeovil
	Betsy 48'		Scotland 40'; Bodde 79'	Stadium: Huish Park; Attendance: 6,207

3 November 2007 14	Crewe Alexandra	2–0	Yeovil Town	Crewe
	McCready 28'; Moore 40'			Stadium: Gresty Road; Attendance: 4,363

6 November 2007 15	Cheltenham Town	1–1	Yeovil Town	Cheltenham
	Caines 89'		Owusu 31'	Stadium: Whaddon Road; Attendance: 3,169

18 November 2007 16	Yeovil Town	2–1	Gillingham	Yeovil
	Owusu 66'; Walker 88'		Dickson 76'	Stadium: Huish Park; Attendance: 4,408

24 November 2007 17	Millwall	2–1	Yeovil Town	London
	O'Hara 71'; Fuseini 82'		Walker 49'	Stadium: The Den; Attendance: 8,105

4 December 2007 18	Yeovil Town	2–1	Bournemouth	Yeovil
	Skiverton 3'; Walker 38'; Jones (red card) 64'		Cummings 65' (pen.)	Stadium: Huish Park; Attendance: 5,321

8 December 2007 19	Yeovil Town	3–1	Hartlepool United	Yeovil
	Skiverton 27'; Stewart 31'; Owusu 77'		Mackay 10'	Stadium: Huish Park; Attendance: 4,694

16 December 2007 20	Doncaster Rovers	1–2	Yeovil Town	Doncaster
	Skiverton 50' (o.g.)		Way 37'; Stewart 78' (red card) 90'	Stadium: Keepmoat Stadium; Attendance: 5,967

22 December 2007 21	Leyton Orient	0–0	Yeovil Town	London
				Stadium: Matchroom Stadium; Attendance: 4,687

26 December 2007 22	Yeovil Town	0–1	Swindon Town	Yeovil
	Skiverton (red card) 78'		Corr 66'	Stadium: Huish Park; Attendance: 6,539

29 December 2007 23	Yeovil Town	2–1	Brighton & Hove Albion	Yeovil
	Dempsey 42'; Stieber 50'		Revell 19'	Stadium: Huish Park; Attendance: 6,881

1 January 2008 24	Luton Town	1–0	Yeovil Town	Luton
	Andrew 48'		Warne (red card) 89'	Stadium: Kenilworth Road; Attendance: 6,811

8 January 2008 25	Yeovil Town	0–2	Walsall	Yeovil
			Dann 59'; Nicholls 64'	Stadium: Huish Park; Attendance: 4,319

12 January 2008 26	Southend United	1–1	Yeovil Town	Southend-on-sea
	Bailey 20'; Harrold (red card) 89'		Owusu 71'	Stadium: Roots Hall; Attendance: 7,352

19 January 2008 27	Yeovil Town	0–0	Oldham Athletic	Yeovil
				Stadium: Huish Park; Attendance: 4,905

26 January 2008 28	Tranmere Rovers	2–1	Yeovil Town	Birkenhead
	Zola 20'; Myrie-Williams 62' (pen.)		Kirk 51'; Bircham (red card) 71'	Stadium: Prenton Park; Attendance: 5,386

29 January 2008 29	Port Vale	2–2	Yeovil Town	Stoke-on-Trent
	Eckersley 38'; Edwards 58'		Dempsey 6'; Kirk 52'	Stadium: Vale Park; Attendance: 2,869

2 February 2008 30	Yeovil Town	0–2	Huddersfield Town	Yeovil
			Beckett 25' (pen.); Collins 51'	Stadium: Huish Park; Attendance: 4,823

9 February 2008 31	Walsall	2–0	Yeovil Town	Walsall
	Holmes 55'; Betsy 90'			Stadium: Banks's Stadium; Attendance: 5,034

12 February 2008 32	Yeovil Town	1–0	Northampton Town	Yeovil
	Skiverton 90'			Stadium: Huish Park; Attendance: 5,001

16 February 2008 33	Oldham Athletic	3–0	Yeovil Town	Oldham
	McDonald 15'; Peltier 77' (o.g.); Davies 87'			Stadium: Boundary Park; Attendance: 4,781

23 February 2008 34	Yeovil Town	0–3	Southend United	Yeovil
			Barnard 20'; Clarke 34'; Gower 64'	Stadium: Huish Park; Attendance: 4,820

1 March 2008 35	Gillingham	0–0	Yeovil Town	Gillingham
				Stadium: Priestfield; Attendance: 5,083

8 March 2008 36	Yeovil Town	2–1	Cheltenham Town	Yeovil
	Wright 9' (o.g.); Kirk 73'		Brooker 64'	Stadium: Huish Park; Attendance: 4,588

11 March 2008 37	Yeovil Town	0–1	Millwall	Yeovil
			Savage 70'	Stadium: Huish Park; Attendance: 4,439

15 March 2008 38	Bournemouth	2–0	Yeovil Town	Bournemouth
	Hollands 9'; Vokes 32'			Stadium: Fitness First Stadium; Attendance: 4,145

21 March 2008 39	Yeovil Town	2–1	Doncaster Rovers	Yeovil
	Skiverton 22'; Owusu 31'		Heffernan 73'	Stadium: Huish Park; Attendance: 6,146

24 March 2008 40	Hartlepool United	2–0	Yeovil Town	Hartlepool
	Brown 28'; Porter 67'			Stadium: Victoria Park; Attendance: 3,808

29 March 2008 41	Yeovil Town	0–0	Bristol Rovers	Yeovil
				Stadium: Huish Park; Attendance: 6,654

5 April 2008 42	Carlisle United	2–1	Yeovil Town	Carlisle
	Murphy 77'; Dobie 90'		Stewart 38'	Stadium: Brunton Park; Attendance: 6,843

12 April 2008 43	Yeovil Town	0–3	Crewe Alexandra	Yeovil
			Maynard 8', 58'; Pope 90'	Stadium: Huish Park; Attendance: 4,785

19 April 2008 44	Swansea City	1–2	Yeovil Town	Swansea
	Robinson 79'; Pratley (red card) 90'		Skiverton 23'; Downes 60'	Stadium: Liberty Stadium; Attendance: 18,321

26 April 2008 45	Yeovil Town	0–1	Leeds United	Yeovil
			Freedman 4'; Sheehan (red card) 65'	Stadium: Huish Park; Attendance: 9,527

3 May 2008 46	Nottingham Forest	3–2	Yeovil Town	Nottingham
	Bennett 12'; Commons 18'; McGugan 28'		Peters 20'; Kirk 75'	Stadium: City Ground; Attendance: 28,520

=== FA Cup ===
11 November 2007 Round 1	Torquay United	4–1	Yeovil Town	Torquay
	Todd 43', 64'; Stevens 45', 89'		Stewart 20'	Stadium: Plainmoor; Attendance: 3,718

=== League Cup ===
14 August 2007 Round 1	Hereford United	4–1	Yeovil Town	Hereford
	Ainsworth 8', 24', 41'; Easton 35'		Owusu 50'	Stadium: Edgar Street; Attendance: 2,085

=== Football League Trophy ===
4 September 2007 Southern Section Round 1	Yeovil Town	1–0	Shrewsbury Town	Yeovil
	Owusu 53'			Stadium: Huish Park; Attendance: 1,669

9 October 2007 Southern Section Round 2	Hereford United	0–0 (2–4 p)	Yeovil Town	Hereford
				Stadium: Edgar Street; Attendance: 1,859

13 November 2007 Southern Section Quarter Final	Swansea City	1–0	Yeovil Town	Swansea
	Bauzà 41'			Stadium: Liberty Stadium; Attendance: 6,644

== Players ==
=== First-team squad ===
Includes all players who were awarded squad numbers during the season.

Note: Flags indicate national team as defined under FIFA eligibility rules; some limited exceptions apply. Players may hold more than one non-FIFA nationality.

No.	Pos.	Nation	Player
1	GK	ENG	Steve Mildenhall
2	DF	ENG	Mark Lynch
3	MF	WAL	Nathan Jones
4	DF	ENG	Terry Skiverton
5	DF	ENG	Scott Guyett
6	DF	ENG	Terrell Forbes
8	MF	ENG	Anthony Barry
9	FW	ENG	Lloyd Owusu
10	FW	ENG	Marcus Stewart
11	MF	FRA	Jean-François Christophe
12	DF	ENG	Matthew Rose
13	GK	ENG	Darren Behcet
14	FW	ENG	Paul Warne
15	MF	ENG	Liam Bridcutt (on loan from Chelsea)
16	MF	ENG	Jaime Peters (on loan from Ipswich Town)
17	FW	ENG	Simon Church (on loan from Reading)

No.	Pos.	Nation	Player
18	FW	ENG	Darryl Knights
19	DF	ENG	Craig Alcock
20	MF	ENG	Marc Bircham
21	MF	ENG	Jerahl Hughes
22	DF	ENG	Jordan Street
23	MF	ENG	Ishmael Welsh
24	FW	NIR	Andy Kirk
25	MF	HUN	Zoltán Stieber
26	MF	IRL	Stephen Maher
27	MF	ENG	Lee Peltier
28	DF	ENG	Nathan Smith
29	MF	ENG	James Brown
30	FW	FRA	Wilfried Domoraud
32	MF	ENG	Marvin Williams
33	FW	ENG	Aidan Downes

=== Left club during season ===
Note: Flags indicate national team as defined under FIFA eligibility rules; some limited exceptions apply. Players may hold more than one non-FIFA nationality.

No.	Pos.	Nation	Player
31	GK	FRA	Romain Larrieu (returned to parent club Plymouth Argyle following loan spell)
25	MF	SEY	Kevin Betsy (returned to parent club Bristol City following loan spell)
16	MF	ENG	Ritchie Jones (returned to parent club Manchester United following loan spell)
17	MF	ENG	Simon Gillett (returned to parent club Southampton following loan spell)
28	FW	ENG	James Walker (returned to parent club Charlton Athletic following loan spell)
24	DF	ENG	Curtis Ujah
17	MF	ENG	Darren Way (returned to parent club Swansea City following loan spell)

No.	Pos.	Nation	Player
22	FW	ENG	Tom Clarke
7	MF	ENG	Gary Dempsey (Irish footballer) (joined St Patrick's Athletic on 31 January 2008)
15	MF	ENG	Justin Cochrane
11	MF	ENG	Lee Morris
7	MF	ENG	Martin Woods (returned to parent club Doncaster Rovers following loan spell)
31	GK	ENG	Scott Flinders (returned to parent club Crystal Palace following loan spell)
31	GK	BIH	Asmir Begović (returned to parent club Portsmouth following loan spell)
