= 2013–14 Partick Thistle F.C. season =

Partick Thistle
2013–14 season
- Chairman: David Beattie
- Manager: Alan Archibald
- Stadium: Firhill Stadium
- Premiership: Tenth place
- League Cup: Third round
- Scottish Cup: Fourth round
- Top goalscorer: League: Kris Doolan (11); All: Kris Doolan (11)
- Highest home attendance: 7,978 vs. Celtic, Premiership, 27 October 2013
- Lowest home attendance: 1,544 vs. Cowdenbeath, League Cup, 27 August 2013
- Average home league attendance: 4,779
Home colours	Away colours

The 2013–14 season was Partick Thistle's first season back in the top flight of Scottish football after a nine-year absence and the first in the newly established Scottish Premiership, having been promoted from the Scottish First Division at the end of the 2012–13 season. Partick Thistle also competed in the League Cup and the Scottish Cup.

== Results and fixtures ==
Win Draw Loss Postponed

=== Pre Season ===
6 July 2013 Friendly	Gateshead	2 – 1	Partick Thistle	New Ferens Park
15:00	Briggs 2'; Marwood 40'	Partick Report	Baird 81'	Attendance: 602

9 July 2013 Friendly	Annan Athletic	1 – 5	Partick Thistle	Galabank
19:30	Flynn 44'	Partick Report; Annan Report	Elliott 3'; McMillan 5'; Doolan 25'; Trialist 61', 66'	Attendance: 353; Referee: Newlands

13 July 2013 Friendly	Dumbarton	3 – 4	Partick Thistle	Dumbarton Football Stadium
15:00	Gilhaney 4'; Agnew 47'; Megginson 71'	Partick Report; Dumbarton Report	Craigen 9'; Forbes 19'; O'Donnell 28'; Kerr 56'	Referee: Aitken

16 July 2013 Friendly	Livingston	0 – 0	Partick Thistle	Almondvale Stadium
19:30		Partick Report		Referee: Brines

20 July 2013 Friendly	Arbroath	1 – 0	Partick Thistle	Gayfield Park
15:00	Bayne 58'	Partick Report		Referee: Dallas

27 July 2013 Friendly	Partick Thistle	0 – 0	AEL Limassol	Firhill Stadium
15:00		Partick Report		Attendance: 1,261; Referee: Collum

=== Scottish Premiership ===
2 August 2013 Scottish Premiership	Partick Thistle	0 – 0	Dundee United	Firhill Stadium
19:45		BBC Report; Partick Report		Attendance: 7,822; Referee: Thomson

10 August 2013 Scottish Premiership	Ross County	1 – 3	Partick Thistle	Victoria Park
15:00	Carey 71'	BBC Report	Doolan 18'; Lawless 53', 59'	Attendance: 3,331; Referee: Muir

16 August 2013 Scottish Premiership	Partick Thistle	1 – 1	Heart of Midlothian	Firhill Stadium
19:45	Muirhead 86' (Penalty)	BBC Report	Walker 88'	Attendance: 6,540; Referee: Madden

24 August 2013 Scottish Premiership	Motherwell	1 – 0	Partick Thistle	Fir Park
15:00	Sutton 21'	BBC Report		Attendance: 5,527; Referee: Norris

31 August 2013 Scottish Premiership	St Mirren	1 – 2	Partick Thistle	St Mirren Park
15:00	McLean 50'	Report	Higginbotham 81'; Forbes 84'	Attendance: 5,601; Referee: Willie Collum

14 September 2013 Scottish Premiership	Partick Thistle	0 – 3	Aberdeen	Firhill Stadium
15:00		Report	Zola 13'; Pawlett 20'; Magennis 70'	Attendance: 6,193; Referee: John Beaton

21 September 2013 Scottish Premiership	Partick Thistle	1 – 1	Kilmarnock	Firhill Stadium
15:00	Muirhead 11' (pen.)	Report	Boyd 48'	Attendance: 4,310; Referee: Bobby Madden

28 September 2013 Scottish Premiership	St Johnstone	1 – 1	Partick Thistle	McDiarmid Park
15:00	MacLean 42'	Report	Doolan 6'	Attendance: 3,248; Referee: Craig Thomson

7 October 2013 Scottish Premiership	Partick Thistle	0 – 1	Hibernian	Firhill Stadium
15:00		Report	Craig 69'	Attendance: 4,521; Referee: Kevin Clancy

20 October 2013 Scottish Premiership	Inverness Caledonian Thistle	1 – 2	Partick Thistle	Caledonian Stadium
15:00	Warren 47'	Report	Doolan 20', 83'	Attendance: 3,154; Referee: Euan Norris

27 October 2013 Scottish Premiership	Partick Thistle	1 – 2	Celtic	Firhill Stadium
12:45	Doolan 67'	Report	Samaras 34'; Baldé 75'	Attendance: 7,978; Referee: Willie Collum

4 November 2013 Scottish Premiership	Aberdeen	4 – 0	Partick Thistle	Pittodrie Stadium
19:45	McGinn 25', 87'; Zola 40'; Hector 64'	Report		Attendance: 10,057; Referee: Brian Colvin

9 November 2013 Scottish Premiership	Partick Thistle	0 – 3	St Mirren	Firhill Stadium
15:00	O'Donnell (yellow card) 70' (yellow-red card)	BBC Report	Thompson 15', 94'; Newton 72'	Attendance: 4,946; Referee: Beaton

23 November 2013 Scottish Premiership	Dundee United	4 – 1	Partick Thistle	Tannadice Park
15:00	Mackay-Steven 2', 77'; Robertson 70'; Graham 85'	BBC Report	Muirhead 57' (pen.)	Attendance: 6,700; Referee: Willie Collum

7 December 2013 Scottish Premiership	Hibernian	1 – 1	Partick Thistle	Easter Road
15:00	Collins 90'	BBC Report	Doolan 49'	Attendance: 10,431; Referee: Beaton

14 December 2013 Scottish Premiership	Partick Thistle	A – A	St Johnstone	Firhill Stadium
		SKY Report; Partick Report		Referee: Clancy
Note: Abandoned at HT due to waterlogged pitch

21 December 2013 Scottish Premiership	Kilmarnock	2 – 1	Partick Thistle	Rugby Park
	Johnston 42'; Boyd 73'	Report	Doolan 49'	Attendance: 3,865; Referee: Thomson

26 December 2013 Scottish Premiership	Partick Thistle	0 – 0	Inverness Caledonian Thistle	Firhill Stadium
15:00		BBC Report		Attendance: 2,887; Referee: Collum

29 December 2013 Scottish Premiership	Partick Thistle	1 – 5	Motherwell	Firhill Stadium
15:00	Lawless 8'	BBC Report	Lasley 15'; Francis-Angol 21'; McFadden 36'; Ainsworth 57'; Sutton 65'	Attendance: 4,588; Referee: McLean

1 January 2014 Scottish Premiership	Celtic	1 – 0	Partick Thistle	Celtic Park
15:00	Ledley 39'	BBC Report		Attendance: 52,670; Referee: Clancy

5 January 2014 Scottish Premiership	Heart of Midlothian	0 – 2	Partick Thistle	Tynecastle Stadium
15:00		BBC Report	Taylor 14'; Taylor-Sinclair 40'; Bannigan (yellow card) 82' (yellow-red card)	Attendance: 13,763; Referee: Brines

11 January 2014 Scottish Premiership	Partick Thistle	3 – 3	Ross County	Firhill Stadium
15:00	Taylor 28', 39'; Lawless 47'	BBC Report	Kiss 23', 76'; Gordon 50'; Kettlewell (red card) 86'	Attendance: 3,539; Referee: Madden

18 January 2014 Scottish Premiership	Partick Thistle	1 – 1	Kilmarnock	Firhill Stadium
15:00	Higginbotham 3'; Taylor-Sinclair (red card) 89'	BBC Report	Muirhead 91'	Attendance: 4,092; Referee: McLean

21 January 2014 Scottish Premiership	Partick Thistle	0 – 1	St Johnstone	Firhill Stadium
19:45		BBC Report	May 27'	Attendance: 2,719; Referee: Muir

25 January 2014 Scottish Premiership	St Mirren	0 – 0	Partick Thistle	St Mirren Park
15:00		BBC Report		Attendance: 4,660; Referee: Beaton

1 February 2014 Scottish Premiership	Partick Thistle	1 – 1	Dundee United	Firhill Stadium
15:00	Fraser 75'	BBC Report	El Alagui 29'	Attendance: 3,748; Referee: Collum

15 February 2014 Scottish Premiership	Motherwell	4 – 3	Partick Thistle	Fir Park
15:00	Lasley 43'; Ainsworth 52'; Taylor-Sinclair 85'; McManus 88'	BBC Report	Erskine 37'; Higginbotham 66' (Penalty), 72'	Attendance: 5,048; Referee: Finnie

22 February 2014 Scottish Premiership	Partick Thistle	3 – 1	Aberdeen	Firhill Stadium
15:00	Balatoni 59'; Taylor 64', 72'	BBC Report	Rooney 66'	Attendance: 4,554; Referee: Muir

1 March 2014 Scottish Premiership	Ross County	1 – 1	Partick Thistle	Victoria Park
15:00	Brittain 14'	BBC Report	Higginbotham 9'	Attendance: 3,441; Referee: Thomson

15 March 2014 Scottish Premiership	Partick Thistle	3 – 1	Hibernian	Firhill Stadium
15:00	Erskine 43'; Mair 60'; Higginbotham 90'	BBC Report	Watmore 62'	Attendance: 4,448; Referee: Colvin

22 March 2014 Scottish Premiership	Inverness Caledonian Thistle	1 – 0	Partick Thistle	Caledonian Stadium
15:00	McKay 62'	BBC Report		Attendance: 3,093; Referee: Clancy

26 March 2014 Scottish Premiership	Partick Thistle	1 – 5	Celtic	Firhill Stadium
19:45	Elliott 85'	BBC Report	Stokes 4', 90+2'; Henderson 49'; Johansen 53'; Commons 90+3'	Attendance: 7,549; Referee: McLean

29 March 2014 Scottish Premiership	St Johnstone	1 – 1	Partick Thistle	McDiarmid Park
15:00	May 9'	BBC Report	Doolan 90'	Attendance: 2,999; Referee: Craig Thomson

5 April 2014 Scottish Premiership	Partick Thistle	2 – 4	Heart of Midlothian	Firhill Stadium
15:00	Doolan 5'; McMillan 88'	BBC Report	Carrick 44'; King 50'; Stevenson 61', 68'	Attendance: 4,262; Referee: Finnie

19 April 2014 Scottish Premiership	Kilmarnock	1 – 2	Partick Thistle	Rugby Park
15:00	Maksimenko 54'	BBC Report	Higginbotham 57'; Taylor-Sinclair 85'	Attendance: 4,980; Referee: Colvin

25 April 2014 Scottish Premiership	Partick Thistle	1 – 1	St Mirren	Firhill Stadium
19:45	Doolan 26'	BBC Report	McLean 45' (Penalty)	Attendance: 5,971; Referee: Murray

3 May 2014 Scottish Premiership	Hibernian	1 – 1	Partick Thistle	Easter Road
15:00	Nelson (yellow card) 80' (yellow-red card); Stanton 88'	BBC Report	Doolan 8'	Attendance: 10,740; Referee: Muir

10 May 2014 Scottish Premiership	Partick Thistle	2 – 3	Ross County	Firhill
15:00	Taylor 51'; Moncur 73'	BBC Report	Slew 22'; Arquin 48' de Leeuw 77'	Attendance: 4,390; Referee: Madden

=== Scottish League Cup ===
6 August 2013 Scottish League Cup round 1	Partick Thistle	2 – 1	Ayr United	Firhill Stadium
19:45	O’Donnell 13'; Balatoni 83'	BBC Report	Shankland 89'	Attendance: 2,145; Referee: Brines

27 August 2013 Scottish League Cup round 2	Partick Thistle	3 – 1 (a.e.t.)	Cowdenbeath	Firhill Stadium
19:45	Elliott 92'; Lawless 103'; Muirhead 114' (pen.)	BBC Sport	Hemmings 93'	Attendance: 1,544; Referee: John McKendrick

25 September 2013 Scottish League Cup round 3	Dundee United	4 – 1	Partick Thistle	Tannadice Park
19:45	Goodwillie 33', 45', 90'; Dow 87'	BBC Sport	Elliott 89'	Attendance: 3,778; Referee: Calum Murray

=== Scottish Cup ===
1 December 2013 Scottish Cup round 4	Partick Thistle	0 – 1	Aberdeen	Firhill Stadium
12:45		BBC Report	Considine 5'	Attendance: 3,642; Referee: Madden

== Player statistics ==
=== Squad ===
Last updated 4 May 2014

No.	Pos	Nat	Player	Total		Premiership		League Cup		Scottish Cup	
No.	Pos	Nat	Player	Apps	Goals	Apps	Goals	Apps	Goals	Apps	Goals
1	GK	(Scotland) SCO	Scott Fox	24	0	20+0	0	3+0	0	1+0	0
2	DF	(Scotland) SCO	Stephen O’Donnell	30	1	23+4	0	3+0	1	0+0	0
3	DF	(Scotland) SCO	Aaron Taylor-Sinclair	39	2	35+0	2	3+0	0	1+0	0
4	MF	(Scotland) SCO	Sean Welsh	13	0	10+0	0	1+1	0	0+1	0
5	DF	(Scotland) SCO	Aaron Muirhead	21	4	18+2	3	1+0	1	0+0	0
6	DF	(England) ENG	Conrad Balatoni	32	2	29+0	1	2+0	1	1+0	0
7	FW	(England) ENG	James Craigen	32	0	24+5	0	1+1	0	1+0	0
8	MF	(Scotland) SCO	Stuart Bannigan	34	0	32+0	0	1+1	0	0+0	0
9	FW	(Scotland) SCO	Kris Doolan	38	11	22+13	11	1+1	0	1+0	0
10	MF	(Scotland) SCO	Ross Forbes	20	1	1+15	1	3+0	0	1+0	0
10	MF	(Ghana) GHA	Prince Buaben	11	0	9+2	0	0+0	0	0+0	0
11	MF	(Scotland) SCO	Steven Lawless	31	5	17+10	4	1+2	1	0+1	0
12	GK	(Scotland) SCO	Paul Gallacher	16	0	16+0	0	0+0	0	0+0	0
13	DF	(Mexico) MEX	Gabriel	19	0	14+1	0	3+0	0	1+0	0
14	FW	(England) ENG	Christie Elliott	32	3	9+19	1	2+1	2	1+0	0
15	MF	(Scotland) SCO	Hugh Murray	1	0	1+0	0	0+0	0	0+0	0
15	DF	(Scotland) SCO	Lee Mair	14	1	14+0	1	0+0	0	0+0	0
16	DF	(Scotland) SCO	Jordan McMillan	14	1	14+0	1	0+0	0	0+0	0
17	FW	(Scotland) SCO	John Baird	17	0	2+11	0	2+1	0	0+1	0
17	MF	(England) ENG	George Moncur	1	0	0+1	0	0+0	0	0+0	0
18	FW	(Scotland) SCO	Mark McGuigan	0	0	0+0	0	0+0	0	0+0	0
19	MF	(England) ENG	Isaac Osbourne	14	0	11+1	0	1+0	0	1+0	0
20	MF	(Scotland) SCO	Mark Kerr	4	0	0+0	0	3+0	0	1+0	0
21	FW	(Democratic Republic of the Congo) COD	Henoc Mukendi	1	0	0+0	0	0+1	0	0+0	0
21	FW	(England) ENG	Lyle Taylor	18	5	15+3	5	0+0	0	0+0	0
22	MF	(Scotland) SCO	Gary Fraser	17	1	16+1	1	0+0	0	0+0	0
23	FW	(England) ENG	Kallum Higginbotham	37	8	31+3	8	2+0	0	1+0	0
26	DF	(Scotland) SCO	Liam Lindsay	1	0	0+1	0	0+0	0	0+0	0
28	MF	(Scotland) SCO	Chris Erskine	13	2	13+0	2	0+0	0	0+0	0
31	MF	(Scotland) SCO	David Wilson	1	0	0+1	0	0+0	0	0+0	0

=== Disciplinary record ===
Includes all competitive matches.

Last updated 4 May 2014

Number	Nation	Position	Name	Premiership		League Cup		Scottish Cup		Total	
Number	Nation	Position	Name	Yellow card	Red card	Yellow card	Red card	Yellow card	Red card	Yellow card	Red card
1	(Scotland)	GK	Scott Fox	0	0	0	0	0	0	0	0
2	(Scotland)	DF	Stephen O’Donnell	6	1	0	0	0	0	6	1
3	(Scotland)	DF	Aaron Taylor-Sinclair	5	1	0	0	0	0	5	1
4	(Scotland)	MF	Sean Welsh	2	0	0	0	0	0	2	0
5	(Scotland)	DF	Aaron Muirhead	3	0	0	0	0	0	3	0
6	(England)	DF	Conrad Balatoni	4	1	0	0	0	0	4	1
7	(England)	FW	James Craigen	3	0	0	0	0	0	3	0
8	(Scotland)	MF	Stuart Bannigan	8	2	0	0	0	0	8	2
9	(Scotland)	FW	Kris Doolan	3	0	0	0	0	0	3	0
10	(Scotland)	MF	Ross Forbes	1	0	0	0	0	0	1	0
10	(Ghana)	MF	Prince Buaben	3	0	0	0	0	0	3	0
11	(Scotland)	MF	Steven Lawless	0	0	0	0	0	0	0	0
12	(Scotland)	GK	Paul Gallacher	2	0	0	0	0	0	2	0
13	(Mexico)	DF	Gabriel	3	0	0	0	0	0	3	0
14	(England)	FW	Christie Elliott	3	0	1	0	0	0	4	0
15	(Scotland)	MF	Hugh Murray	0	0	0	0	0	0	0	0
15	(Scotland)	DF	Lee Mair	2	0	0	0	0	0	1	1
16	(Scotland)	DF	Jordan McMillan	4	0	0	0	0	0	4	0
17	(Scotland)	FW	John Baird	2	0	1	0	0	0	3	0
17	(England)	MF	George Moncur	0	0	0	0	0	0	0	0
18	(Scotland)	FW	Mark McGuigan	0	0	0	0	0	0	0	0
19	(England)	MF	Isaac Osbourne	3	0	0	0	0	0	3	0
20	(Scotland)	MF	Mark Kerr	0	0	1	0	0	0	1	0
21	(Democratic Republic of the Congo)	FW	Henoc Mukendi	0	0	0	0	0	0	0	0
21	(England)	FW	Lyle Taylor	2	0	0	0	0	0	2	0
22	(Scotland)	MF	Gary Fraser	1	0	0	0	0	0	1	0
23	(England)	FW	Kallum Higginbotham	8	0	0	0	0	0	8	0
26	(Scotland)	DF	Liam Lindsay	0	0	0	0	0	0	0	0
28	(Scotland)	MF	Chris Erskine	3	0	0	0	0	0	3	0
31	(Scotland)	MF	David Wilson	0	0	0	0	0	0	0	0

== Team statistics ==
=== League table ===
Pos	Team	Pld	W	D	L	GF	GA	GD	Pts	Qualification or relegation
8	St Mirren	38	10	9	19	39	58	−19	39	
9	Kilmarnock	38	11	6	21	45	66	−21	39	
10	Partick Thistle	38	8	14	16	46	65	−19	38	
11	Hibernian (R)	38	8	11	19	31	51	−20	35	Qualification for the Premiership play-off final
12	Heart of Midlothian (R)	38	10	8	20	45	65	−20	23 (Note: Heart of Midlothian were deducted 15 points for entering administration)	Relegation to the Championship

Source: SPFL Archive
Rules for classification: 1) points; 2) goal difference; 3) number of goals scored.
(R) Relegated

=== Division summary ===
Round	1	2	3	4	5	6	7	8	9	10	11	12	13	14	15	16	17	18	19	20	21	22	23	24	25	26	27	28	29	30	31	32	33	34	35	36	37	38
Ground	H	A	H	A	A	H	H	A	H	A	H	A	H	A	A	H	A	H	H	A	A	H	H	H	A	H	A	H	A	H	A	H	A	H	A	H	A	H
Result	D	W	D	L	W	L	D	D	L	W	L	L	L	L	D	L	D	L	L	W	D	D	L	D	D	L	W	D	W	L	L	D	L	W	D	D	D	L
Position	7	3	5	7	4	7	6	7	8	7	8	8	8	9	9	10	10	10	10	10	10	11	11	11	11	11	10	10	9	9	10	10	11	10	9	9	9	10

Updated to match(es) played on 4 May 2014. Source:
A = Away; H = Home; W = Win; D = Draw; L = Loss

=== Management statistics ===
Last updated on 4 May 2014

Name	From	To	P	W	D	L	Win% (Note: Win% is the percentage of matches won rounded to two decimal places.)
Alan Archibald	2 August 2013	3 May 2014	40	9	14	17	22.50

== Transfers ==
=== Players in ===
Player	From	Fee
(Scotland) Paul Gallacher	(Scotland) Ross County	Free
(Scotland) John Baird	(Scotland) Dundee	Free
(Scotland) Mark Kerr	(Scotland) Dundee	Free
(Scotland) Declan McDaid	(Scotland) Greenock Morton	Free
(Democratic Republic of the Congo) Henoc Mukendi	(England) Liverpool	Loan
(Scotland) Gary Fraser	(England) Bolton Wanderers	Loan
(Scotland) Ross Meechan	(Scotland) St Mirren	Free
(Scotland) James Martin	(Scotland) Hamilton Academical	Free
(Scotland) Darren Brownlie	(Scotland) Ayr United	Free
(Mexico) Gabriel	(Spain) Rayo Vallecano B	Free
(England) Isaac Osbourne	(Scotland) Aberdeen	Free
(Spain) Simón Colina	(Spain) Barcelona Juvenil B	Free
(England) Kallum Higginbotham	(England) Huddersfield Town	Free
(New Zealand) Scott Basalaj	(New Zealand) Wellington Phoenix	Free
(England) Lyle Taylor	(England) Sheffield United	Loan
(Scotland) Gary Fraser	(England) Bolton Wanderers	Free
(Scotland) Lee Mair	(Scotland) St Mirren	Free
(Scotland) Chris Erskine	(Scotland) Dundee United	Loan
(Ghana) Prince Buaben	(England) Carlisle United	Loan
(England) George Moncur	(England) West Ham United	Loan

=== Players out ===
Player	To	Fee
(Scotland) Chris Erskine	(Scotland) Dundee United	Free
(Scotland) Paul Paton	(Scotland) Dundee United	Free
(Scotland) Steven Craig	(England) Wycombe Wanderers	Free
(Scotland) Bradley Halsman		Free
(Scotland) Andy Dowie	(Scotland) Queen Of The South	Free
(Scotland) Jamie Campbell	(Scotland) Clydebank	Free
(Scotland) David Brown		Free
(Scotland) Malcolm McLean	(Scotland) Lanark United	Free
(Scotland) Jordan Moffat		Free
(Scotland) Aaron Sekhon		Free
(Scotland) James Wightman		Free
(Scotland) Ryan Scully	(Scotland) Dunfermline Athletic	Loan
(Scotland) Mark McGuigan	(Scotland) Albion Rovers	Loan
(Scotland) Hugh Murray	(Scotland) Dumbarton	Loan
(Scotland) Gerry O’Donnell	(Scotland) Maryhill	Loan
(Scotland) Gerry O’Donnell		Free
(Scotland) Hugh Murray	(Scotland) Dumbarton	Free
(Scotland) Mark McGuigan	(Scotland) Albion Rovers	Free
(Scotland) John Baird	(Scotland) Raith Rovers	Free
(Scotland) Ross Forbes	(Scotland) Dunfermline Athletic	Free
(Scotland) Mark Kerr	(Scotland) Queen of the South	Free
(Scotland) Liam Lindsay	(Scotland) Alloa Athletic	Loan
(Scotland) James Martin	(Belgium) K.V. Turnhout	Loan
(Scotland) Chris Duggan	(Scotland) Forfar Athletic	Loan

== Contract extensions ==
The following players extended their contracts with the club over the course of the season.

Date	Player	Length	Expiry
21 May 2013	(Scotland) Kris Doolan	2 years	2015
21 May 2013	(Scotland) Ross Forbes	1 years	2014
24 May 2013	(Scotland) Stephen O'Donnell	2 years	2015
3 June 2013	(Scotland) Aaron Muirhead	2 years	2015
4 June 2013	(Scotland) Stuart Bannigan	2 years	2015
17 June 2013	(Scotland) Jordan McMillan	2 years	2015
18 July 2013	(England) Conrad Balatoni (Note: Balatoni signed a one year extension to his current one year contract.)	1 year	2015
14 August 2013	(Scotland) Sean Welsh (Note: Welsh signed a one year extension to his current one year contract.)	1 year	2015
7 January 2014	(New Zealand) Scott Basalaj	5 Months	2014
