= Craig Alcock =

English footballer (born 1987)

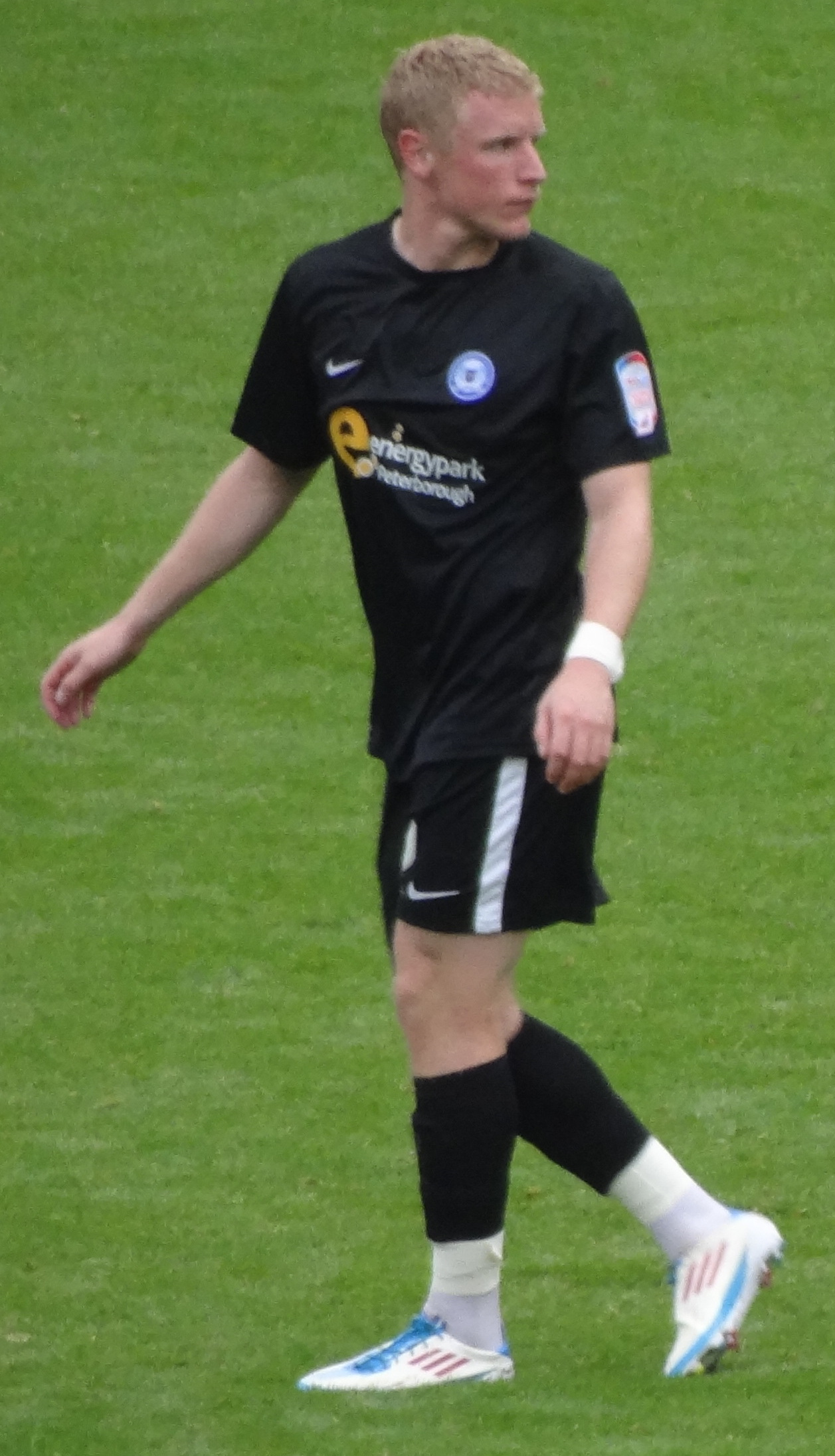
- Alcock playing for Peterborough United in 2011

Personal information
- Full name: Craig Alcock
- Date of birth: 8 December 1987 (age 38)
- Place of birth: Truro, England
- Height: 5 ft 8 in (1.73 m)
- Position: Defender

Youth career
- 2004–2005: Yeovil Town

Senior career*
Years	Team	Apps	(Gls)
2005–2011	Yeovil Town	107	(3)
2006	→ Weston-super-Mare (loan)	3	(0)
2007	→ Taunton Town (loan)	5	(0)
2007	→ Tiverton Town (loan)	12	(0)
2011–2014	Peterborough United	112	(0)
2014–2016	Sheffield United	27	(0)
2015–2016	→ Doncaster Rovers (loan)	9	(0)
2016–2018	Doncaster Rovers	54	(0)
2018–2019	Cheltenham Town	8	(0)
2019–2020	Yeovil Town	21	(0)
2020–2022	Harlow Town	28	(5)
Total		370	(8)
- * Club domestic league appearances and goals

Craig Alcock (born 8 December 1987) is an English former professional footballer who played as a defender. Having begun his career at Yeovil Town he spent time on loan at Weston-super-Mare, Taunton Town and Tiverton Town before moving to Peterborough United. Alcock then played for Sheffield United, Doncaster Rovers and Cheltenham Town. Following a return to Yeovil Town and a stint at Harlow Town, he retired from playing in 2022. Alcock is a U16s coach at Luton Town.

== Career ==
=== Yeovil Town ===
Born in Truro, Cornwall, Alcock started his career with the Yeovil Town youth system in 2004. At the start of the 2005–06 season Alcock was awarded a first team contract along with fellow youth teammates Tom Clarke and Jake Smeeton. Due to being over-age for playing in the youth side for Yeovil Town, he had three short-term loan spells in the 2006–07 season with Conference South side Weston-super-mare, Southern League sides Taunton Town and Tiverton Town. He made his first team debut as a substitute away at Gillingham in the final league match of the 2006–07 season.

After making a breakthrough and challenging for the number one right back slot in the 2007–08 season, Alcock became a regular starter during the 2008–09 season due to injuries and suspensions concerning Lee Peltier. In February 2008 Alcock had to play in goal after an injury to Steve Mildenhall against Walsall; he came on at 0-0 but Yeovil ended up losing 2–0. In May 2009, Alcock signed a new 2-year contract with Yeovil Town, and after new captain Stefan Stam was dropped due to injury and poor form, Alcock was made captain for the remainder of the season.

In early summer 2010, Alcock was linked with a move to championship side Norwich City but remained with Yeovil for the remainder of the season and in May 2011 was informed by the club that he was one of seven Yeovil players who would be awarded new contracts.

=== Peterborough United ===
Despite being offered a new deal at Yeovil, in July 2011 Alcock signed for Peterborough United on a three-year deal with Yeovil receiving £100,000 in compensation due to his age. Alcock made 112 appearances for Posh in all competitions over his three seasons at the club, including winning the EFL Trophy in 2014, before being released at the end of the 2013–14 season.

=== Sheffield United ===
In July 2014, Alcock signed a two-year deal with Sheffield United. Alcock started as a regular in the side both at centre half and then in his more customary role at right back. However, after an injury he has found himself in a more peripheral role, made harder by the January arrivals of additional full backs Kieron Freeman and John Brayford. In his second season at United, Alcock again found match time hard to come by, and as a result joined fellow League One side Doncaster Rovers on a 28-day loan on 10 November 2015. The loan was made permanent on 7 January 2016.

=== Cheltenham Town ===
On 7 August 2018, Cheltenham Town signed the now free agent Alcock on a free transfer. On 26 January 2019, Alcock was released by Cheltenham.

=== Yeovil Town ===
On 1 February 2019, following his release from Cheltenham, Alcock re-signed for Yeovil Town on a contract until the end of the 2018–19 season.

== Personal life ==
Alcock is also a keen cricketer playing for Wincanton CC in the Somerset League. Alcock studied for his A-Levels at Sexey's School in Bruton, Somerset.

== Career statistics ==
As of match played 23 April 2022

Appearances and goals by club, season and competition
Club	Season	League			FA Cup		League Cup		Other		Total	
Club	Season	Division	Apps	Goals	Apps	Goals	Apps	Goals	Apps	Goals	Apps	Goals
Yeovil Town	2006–07	League One	1	0	0	0	0	0	0	0	1	0
Yeovil Town	2007–08	League One	8	0	1	0	1	0	3 (Note: Appearances in EFL Trophy)	0	13	0
Yeovil Town	2008–09	League One	30	1	2	0	2	0	1	0	35	1
Yeovil Town	2009–10	League One	42	1	1	0	0	0	0	0	43	1
Yeovil Town	2010–11	League One	26	1	1	0	1	0	1	0	29	1
Yeovil Town	Total		107	3	5	0	4	0	5	0	121	3
Tiverton Town (loan)	2006–07	Southern Premier Division	12	0	—		—		3 (Note: Two appearances in Southern League Cup, one appearance in Devon St Lukes Challenge Cup)	0	15	0
Peterborough United	2011–12	Championship	41	0	1	0	2	0	—		44	0
Peterborough United	2012–13	Championship	27	0	1	0	1	0	—		29	0
Peterborough United	2013–14	League One	28	0	1	0	3	0	7 (Note: Five appearances in EFL Trophy, two in League One play-offs)	0	39	0
Peterborough United	Total		96	0	3	0	6	0	7	0	112	0
Sheffield United	2014–15	League One	24	0	3	0	3	0	2 (Note: One appearance in EFL Trophy, one in League One play-offs)	0	32	0
Sheffield United	2015–16	League One	3	0	—		1	0	1	0	5	0
Sheffield United	Total		27	0	3	0	4	0	3	0	37	0
Doncaster Rovers	2015–16 (Note: Alcock made nine league appearances and one FA Cup appearance during an initial loan spell, before the deal was made permanent.)	League One	27	0	2	0	—		—		29	0
Doncaster Rovers	2016–17	League Two	27	0	1	0	0	0	1 (Note: Appearances in EFL Trophy)	0	29	0
Doncaster Rovers	2017–18	League One	9	0	1	0	3	0	4	0	17	0
Doncaster Rovers	Total		63	0	4	0	3	0	5	0	75	0
Cheltenham Town	2018–19	League Two	8	0	0	0	0	0	3	0	11	0
Yeovil Town	2018–19	League Two	4	0	—		—		—		4	0
Yeovil Town	2019–20	National League	17	0	0	0	—		0	0	17	0
Yeovil Town	Total		21	0	0	0	0	0	0	0	21	0
Harlow Town	2020–21	Isthmian South Central Division	2	0	3	1	—		0	0	5	1
Harlow Town	2021–22	Southern Division One Central	26	5	1	0	—		6 (Note: Two appearances in FA Trophy, three appearances in Southern League Cup, one appearance in Essex Senior Cup)	0	33	5
Harlow Town	Total		28	5	4	1	—		6	0	38	6
Career total			362	8	19	1	17	0	32	0	430	9

== Honours ==
Peterborough United

- Football League Trophy: 2013–14

Individual

- Doncaster Rovers Player of the Year: 2015–16
