= Aaron Taylor-Sinclair =

Antiguan footballer

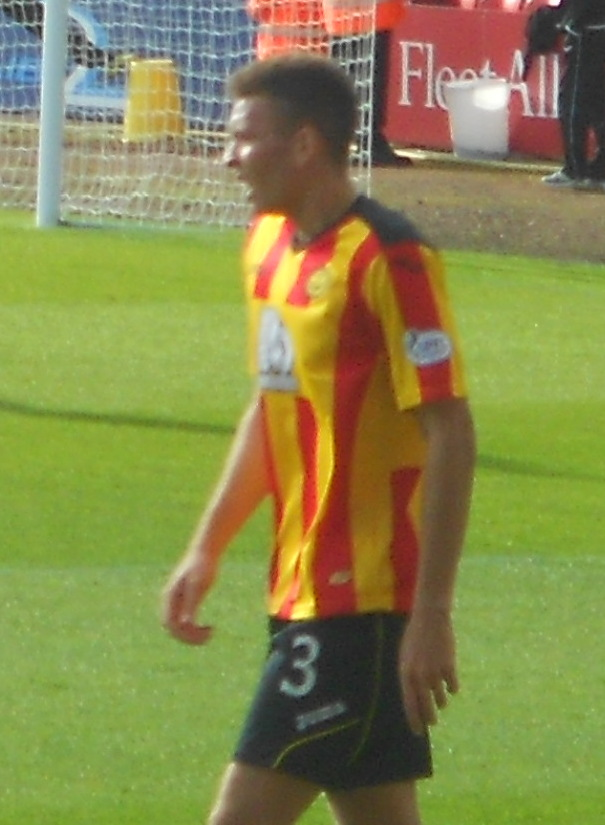
- Taylor-Sinclair in 2011

Personal information
- Full name: Aaron Taylor-Sinclair
- Date of birth: 8 April 1991 (age 35)
- Place of birth: Aberdeen, Scotland
- Height: 1.88 m (6 ft 2 in)
- Position: Defender

Youth career
- 2001–2006: Aberdeen

Senior career*
Years	Team	Apps	(Gls)
2008–2011	Montrose	66	(5)
2011–2014	Partick Thistle	99	(4)
2014–2015	Wigan Athletic	0	(0)
2015–2017	Doncaster Rovers	47	(2)
2017–2018	Plymouth Argyle	24	(0)
2018–2019	Motherwell	6	(0)
2019	→ Crewe Alexandra (loan)	6	(2)
2019–2021	Livingston	20	(3)
2021–2022	Falkirk	16	(1)
2022–2026	Airdrieonians	30	(0)

International career^{‡}
2021–	Antigua and Barbuda	13	(0)

Managerial career
- 2025: Airdrieonians (caretaker)
- 2025–2026: Airdrieonians
- * Club domestic league appearances and goals as of 21:40, 3 May 2025 (UTC) ‡ National team caps and goals as of 00:35, 22 November 2023 (GMT)

Aaron Taylor-Sinclair (born 8 April 1991) is a professional footballer. Born in Scotland, he represents the Antigua and Barbuda national team.

Taylor-Sinclair started his career at Aberdeen as a youth player, having been scouted by the club at age ten. He then joined Scottish Third Division club Montrose, where he played for three years and scored five goals. His talents were then spotted by First Division side Partick Thistle in 2011. After a successful spell at Thistle (including promotion to the Scottish Premiership), Taylor-Sinclair signed for English Championship side Wigan Athletic in 2014.

After spells with Doncaster Rovers and Plymouth Argyle, Taylor-Sinclair returned to Scottish football in 2018 with Motherwell. He spent the second half of the 2019–20 season on loan at Crewe Alexandra and was then released by Motherwell in May 2019. He then had two years with Livingston, before a six-month spell with Falkirk in 2022. He joined Airdrieonians on 1 September 2022, and subsequently took up the role of first team player-coach.

== Club career ==
=== Montrose ===
Taylor-Sinclair began his career with Montrose as a youngster. He began playing football at the age of seven for Middlefield Wasps Boys Club. He then was scouted by Aberdeen Football Club at the age of 10 where he played for five years. He had one season at Albion Boys Club before moving to Montrose where he made his debut on the final day of the 2008–09 season against Albion Rovers. During the following two seasons he became a first team regular at Links Park. His first goal came on 16 March 2010, against Forfar Athletic, with his second coming four days later. In his second season, Sinclair scored three goals within the opening two months and was named as Scottish Football League Young Player of the Month for September 2010. His form over the two seasons at Links Park, earned him the chance to train with SPL side St Johnstone.

=== Partick Thistle ===
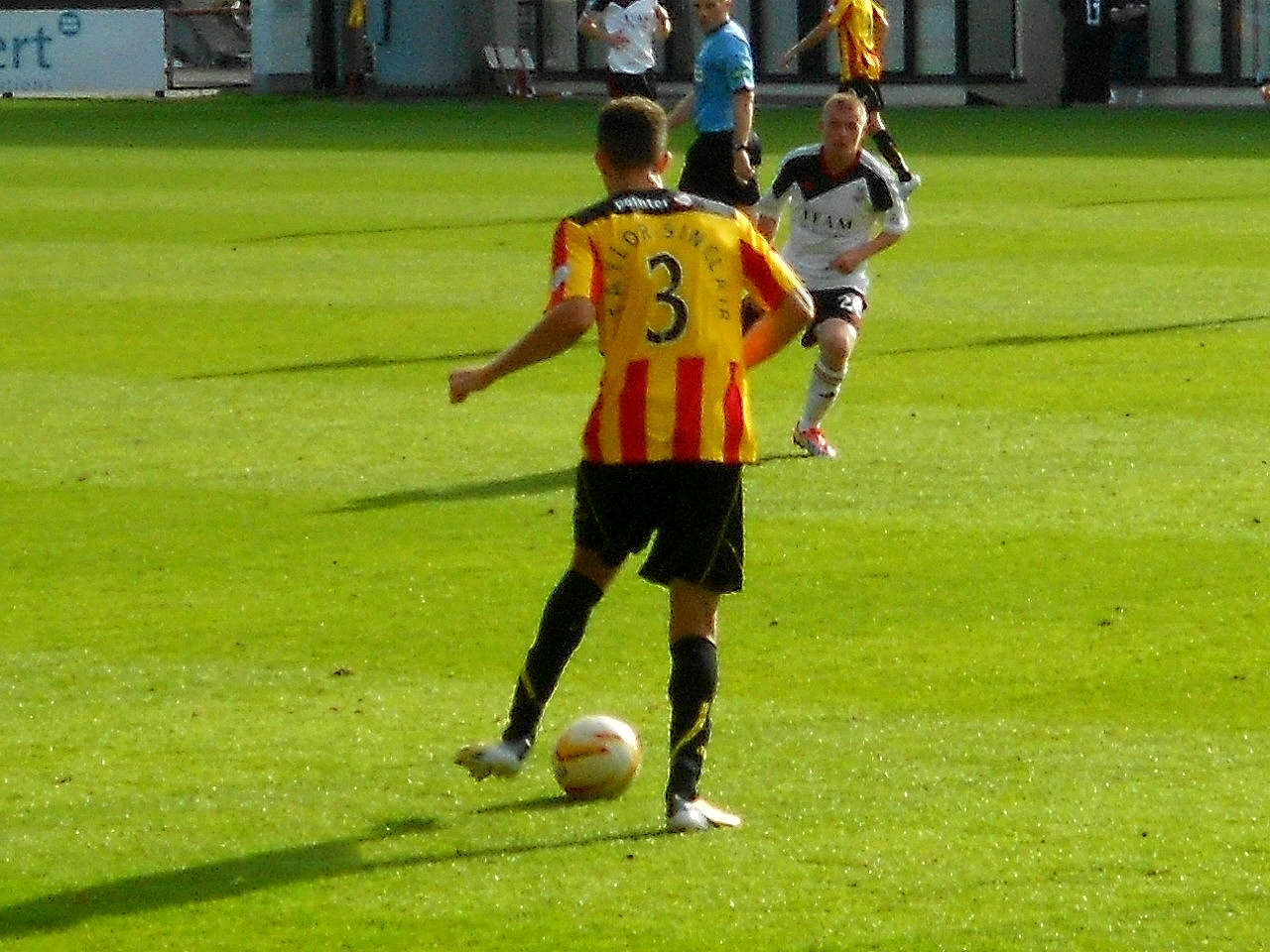
Aaron Taylor-Sinclair in possession

Taylor-Sinclair signed for First Division side Partick Thistle on 5 July 2011, where he signed a two-year contract for an undisclosed fee. He made his competitive debut during a 2–1 victory against Stenhousemuir in the Scottish Challenge Cup on 23 July 2011. His impressive form at the start of the season, led to some attraction from English Championship clubs, such as Cardiff City and Southampton. and he was given the SFL Young Player of the Month award for October 2011.

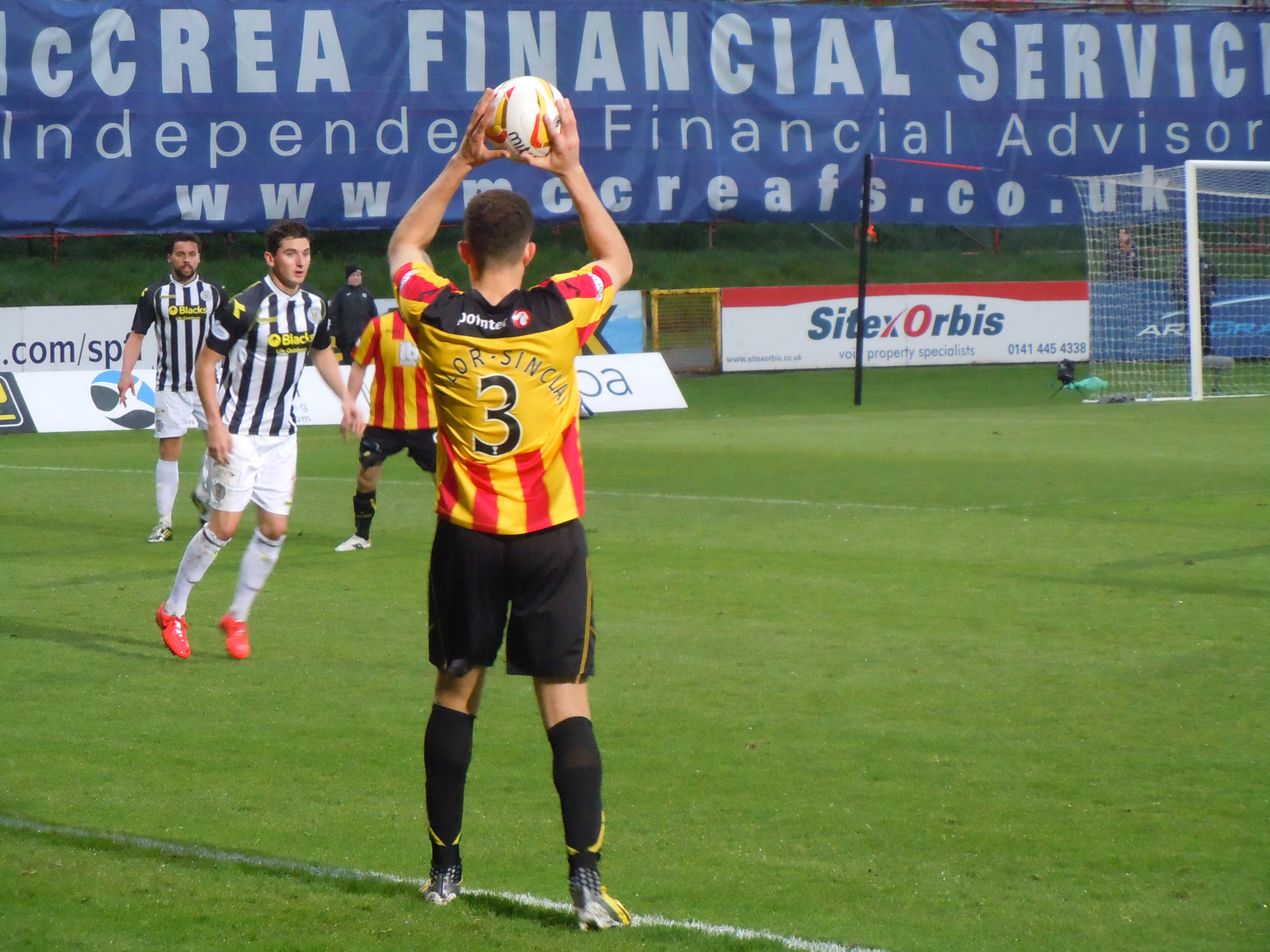
Taylor-Sinclair playing against St Mirren

Taylor-Sinclair played an instrumental part in season 2012–13 as Partick Thistle won the First Division Championship. His impressive form at Thistle sparked interest from Glasgow rivals Celtic and from English clubs including Cardiff City and Middlesbrough.

=== Wigan Athletic ===
In June 2014, Taylor-Sinclair left Thistle for a move to English Championship club Wigan Athletic. He made his debut for the club in a 2–1 defeat away to Burton Albion in the League Cup.

=== Doncaster Rovers ===
On 20 July 2015, Taylor-Sinclair joined League One side Doncaster Rovers on a two-year contract. In the final match of the 2015–16 season, against Burton Albion, he suffered an injury which was expected to keep him out for up to nine months.

=== Plymouth Argyle ===
On 28 June 2017, Taylor-Sinclair joined League One Plymouth Argyle. He was released by Plymouth at the end of the 2017–18 season.

=== Motherwell ===
Taylor-Sinclair signed a one-year contract with Scottish Premiership club Motherwell in June 2018.

On 30 January 2019, Taylor-Sinclair was loaned to English League Two side Crewe Alexandra until the end of the season. He made his Crewe debut on 16 February 2019 coming on as a second-half substitute for Harry Pickering at Oldham Athletic, and scored his first Crewe goal on 30 March 2019 against Cheltenham Town at Gresty Road.

In May 2019, Taylor-Sinclair was released by Motherwell at the end of his contract.

=== Livingston ===
On 6 November 2019, Taylor-Sinclair signed a short-term contract with Livingston. Taylor-Sinclair would sign an extension to stay for the full season, and later another extension to stay at the club for the 2020–21 season. It was announced in May 2021 that Taylor-Sinclair would be released upon the expiry of his contract at the end of the season.

=== Falkirk ===
On 29 December 2021, Taylor-Sinclair signed with Scottish League One side Falkirk until the end of the 2021–22 season, scoring on his debut in a 6–2 win against Dumbarton. Taylor-Sinclair was released by Falkirk at the end of the 2021–22 season.

=== Airdrieonians ===
On 1 September 2022, following his release from Falkirk, Taylor-Sinclair signed with fellow League One side Airdrieonians, winning promotion to the Championship via the League One Play Off final victory over Hamilton Academical FC in May 2023. He scored his goal for the Diamonds in a 6-2 play-off first leg win against Falkirk.

After manager Rhys McCabe resigned from his position in August 2025, Taylor-Sinclair was put in caretaker charge of the team for one match before the appointment of Danny Lennon. He again became caretaker manager in October 2025, after Lennon left the club. Taylor-Sinclair left Airdrie in May 2026, following their relegation to League One via the playoffs.

== International career ==
Born in Scotland, Taylor-Sinclair is of Antiguan descent. He was called up to represent the Antigua and Barbuda national team for a pair of friendlies in June 2021. He debuted for Antigua and Barbuda in a 1–0 2022 FIFA World Cup qualification win over Grenada on 4 June 2021.

== Career statistics ==
As of 22 April 2021

Appearances and goals by club, season and competition
Club	Season	Competition	League		National cup (Note: Includes Scottish Cup, FA Cup)		League cup (Note: Includes Scottish League Cup, EFL Cup)		Other		Total	
Club	Season	Competition	Apps	Goals	Apps	Goals	Apps	Goals	Apps	Goals	Apps	Goals
Montrose	2008–09	Scottish Third Division	1	0	0	0	0	0	0	0	1	0
Montrose	2009–10	Scottish Third Division	30	2	3	1	1	0	0	0	34	3
Montrose	2010–11	Scottish Third Division	35	3	5	1	1	0	0	0	41	4
Montrose	Total		66	5	8	2	2	0	0	0	76	7
Partick Thistle	2011–12	Scottish First Division	30	1	3	0	1	0	2	0	36	1
Partick Thistle	2012–13	Scottish First Division	33	1	2	0	2	0	3	1	40	2
Partick Thistle	2013–14	Scottish Premiership	36	2	1	0	3	0	0	0	40	2
Partick Thistle	Total		99	4	6	0	6	0	5	1	116	5
Wigan Athletic	2014–15	Championship	0	0	0	0	1	0	0	0	1	0
Doncaster Rovers	2015–16	League One	43	2	3	0	2	0	1	0	49	2
Doncaster Rovers	2016–17	League Two	4	0	0	0	0	0	0	0	4	0
Doncaster Rovers	Total		47	2	3	0	3	0	1	0	54	2
Plymouth Argyle	2017–18	League One	24	0	0	0	1	0	2	0	27	0
Motherwell	2018–19	Scottish Premiership	6	0	0	0	3	0	0	0	9	0
Crewe Alexandra (loan)	2018–19	League Two	6	2	0	0	0	0	0	0	6	2
Livingston	2019–20	Scottish Premiership	14	3	0	0	0	0	0	0	14	3
Livingston	2020–21	Scottish Premiership	6	0	1	0	4	1	0	0	11	1
Livingston	Total		56	5	1	0	8	1	2	0	67	6
Falkirk	2021–22	Scottish League One	0	0	0	0	0	0	0	0	0	0
Airdrieonians	2022–23	Scottish League One	21	1	1	0	0	0	1	0	23	1
Career total			289	17	19	2	19	1	9	1	336	21

=== Managerial statistics ===
As of match played 25 April 2026

Team	From	To	Record					Ref
Team	From	To	G	W	D	L	Win %	Ref
Airdrieonians (Caretaker)	August 2025	August 2025	1	0	1	0	0.00	
Airdrieonians	October 2025	May 2026	32	13	9	10	40.63	
Total			33	13	10	10	39.39	—

== Honours ==
Partick Thistle

- Scottish First Division: 2012–13

Individual

- Scottish Football League Young Player of the month: September 2010, October 2011
- PFA Scotland First Division Team of the Year: 2011–12, 2012–13
