= Henoc Mukendi =

Congolese footballer (born 1993)

Personal information
- Full name: Henoc John Mukendi
- Date of birth: 20 November 1993 (age 32)
- Place of birth: Lubumbashi, Zaire
- Height: 1.95 m (6 ft 5 in)
- Position: Forward

Youth career
- 2007–2012: Liverpool

Senior career*
Years	Team	Apps	(Gls)
2012–2014	Liverpool	0	(0)
2012–2013	→ Northampton Town (loan)	7	(0)
2013–2014	→ Partick Thistle (loan)	0	(0)
2014	Ashton United	3	(1)
2015–2016	Marine	6	(2)
2016	Stalybridge Celtic	8	(0)
2016	→ Northwich Victoria (loan)	1	(0)
2016	→ Colne (loan)	0	(0)
2017	Atherton Collieries	6	(1)
2017	Sutton Coldfield Town		
2017	Atherton Collieries	1	(1)
2017	Mossley	1	(0)
2018	Radcliffe		
2018	Shelley		
2018	Atherton LR		

International career
2011–2012	DR Congo U-18	1	(0)
- * Club domestic league appearances and goals as of 10:00, 1 September 2017 (UTC)

Henoc John Mukendi (20 November 1993) is a former Congolese footballer who played as a striker.

== Club career ==
=== Liverpool ===
Mukendi joined Liverpool's youth teams in 2007 and made his debut for the Under 18's in the 2010–11 season, going on to make nine appearances and score two goals. He also made his debut for the reserves on 30 March 2011 as a second-half substitute in a Lancashire Senior Cup match against Preston North End. The following season, he played regularly again for the Under 18s and reserves and in May 2012 he signed a two-year professional contract with Liverpool.

==== Northampton Town (loan) ====
In early August 2012, he joined Northampton Town on loan until January 2013. He made his club debut on 14 August in a League Cup match against Cardiff and his Football League on 18 August against Rochdale. His first senior goal came on 9 October as the club beat Colchester in a Football League Trophy match. On 3 January 2013, his loan spell with Northampton ended and he returned to his parent club Liverpool.

==== Partick Thistle (loan) ====
On 19 July 2013, he joined Scottish top flight club Partick Thistle on loan until 1 January 2014. He made only one competitive appearance for the SPFL side which was on 6 August 2013, during a 2–1 victory over Ayr United in the Scottish League Cup. After six-month at the club, he returned to Liverpool.

Mukendi suggested on his Twitter account that he had been released by Liverpool.

=== Ashton United ===
He then moved into non-league football, signing for Ashton United, before moving to Marine.

=== Stalybridge Celtic ===
In July 2016 he moved to Stalybridge Celtic.

==== Northwich Victoria and Colne (loans) ====
In September 2016 he joined Northwich Victoria on loan. On 3 October 2016, Mukendi joined Colne.

=== Atherton Collieries ===
In January 2017 he joined Atherton Collieries.

=== Sutton Coldfield Town ===
Only 2 months later, he joined Sutton Coldfield Town.

=== Atherton Collieries (second spell) ===
In August 2017 he again played for Atherton Collieries

=== Mossley ===
He then joined Mossley in September 2017. He made his debut for the club on 5 September in an FA Cup match against 1874 Northwich.

=== Radcliffe ===
In January 2018 he joined Radcliffe.

=== Shelley ===
At the beginning of the 2018–19 season he was playing for Shelley.

=== Atherton LR ===
In August 2018, Mukendi signed for North West Counties Football League club Atherton LR.

== International career ==
In 2011 Mukendi was a member of an under-18 Congolese team who played a friendly match in England.

== Personal life ==
His older brother, Vinny is also a footballer. He also has two sisters and two younger brothers

== Career statistics ==
Up to date, as of 24 July 2013.

Appearances and goals by club, season and competition
Club	Season	League		FA Cup		League Cup		Europe		Other		Total	
Club	Season	Apps	Goals	Apps	Goals	Apps	Goals	Apps	Goals	Apps	Goals	Apps	Goals
Northampton Town	2012–13	7	0	0	0	2	0	0	0	2	1	11	1
Partick Thistle	2013–14	0	0	0	0	1	0	0	0	0	0	1	0
Career total		7	0	0	0	3	0	0	0	2	1	12	1
