= Conor Grant (footballer, born 1995) =

English footballer

Personal information
- Full name: Conor James Grant
- Date of birth: 18 April 1995 (age 31)
- Place of birth: Fazakerley, England
- Height: 6 ft 0 in (1.84 m)
- Positions: Midfielder; wing-back

Team information
- Current team: Accrington Stanley
- Number: 8

Youth career
- 2008–2013: Everton

Senior career*
Years	Team	Apps	(Gls)
2013–2018	Everton	0	(0)
2015	→ Motherwell (loan)	12	(1)
2015–2016	→ Doncaster Rovers (loan)	19	(2)
2016	→ Ipswich Town (loan)	6	(0)
2017	→ Doncaster Rovers (loan)	21	(1)
2017–2018	→ Crewe Alexandra (loan)	17	(0)
2018–2023	Plymouth Argyle	112	(14)
2023–2025	Port Vale	34	(0)
2025–	Accrington Stanley	41	(0)

International career
2012	England U18	1	(0)
- * Club domestic league appearances and goals as of 16:41, 3 May 2026 (UTC)

Conor James Grant (born 18 April 1995) is an English footballer who plays as a midfielder for EFL League Two club Accrington Stanley.

A former England under-18 international, Grant turned professional at Everton in July 2013. He spent five years on the club's books without making a first-team appearance, instead spending time on loan at Motherwell, Doncaster Rovers, Ipswich Town and Crewe Alexandra. He helped Doncaster to win promotion out of League Two in the 2016–17 campaign. He joined Plymouth Argyle in June 2018, where he would remain for five seasons, helping the club to win promotion out of League Two in 2019–20 and out of League One in 2022–23. Having made 137 appearances for Plymouth, he joined Port Vale on a free transfer in June 2023. He left Vale for Accrington Stanley in February 2025.

== Career ==
=== Everton ===
Grant joined the Academy at Everton at the age of 13. In July 2013, he signed his first professional contract at the club after featuring in pre-season friendlies. However, he missed much of the 2013–14 season due to a chronic back injury. His first involvement with the senior team in a competitive fixture came on 11 December 2014, when he was named as a non-playing substitute against FC Krasnodar in the Europa League.

On 2 February 2015, Grant signed for Motherwell of the Scottish Premiership on a six-month loan. Twelve days later he made a scoring debut, curling in a free kick in a 3–2 away defeat against Ross County. He made eleven further appearances under Ian Baraclough across the 2014–15 season, and then featured as a substitute in the relegation/promotion play-off final second leg win over Rangers at Fir Park. On 29 October 2015, he joined League One club Doncaster Rovers on a one-month loan deal. Two days later he made his debut against Colchester United at the Keepmoat Stadium, opening a 2–0 win with a 20 yards (18 m) strike. On 6 March, he scored a brace in the FA Cup as Doncaster recorded a 3–1 victory at Cambridge United. The loan was later extended till the end of the 2015–16 season, though was curtailed in mid-March after he sustained an Achilles injury. Relegated Doncaster expressed an interest in signing him permanently, but he instead signed a new two-year deal with Everton.

Grant signed for Championship club Ipswich Town on a season-long loan on 4 August 2016, making his debut at Portman Road two days later in a 4–2 win over Barnsley. However, he returned to Everton early on 18 November, having played seven games for Ipswich. Manager Mick McCarthy said that he couldn't give Grant playing time ahead of the likes of Tom Lawrence, Kundai Benyu and Andre Dozzell and that it would be better for the player's development to return to Finch Farm. On 2 January 2017, Grant once again signed for Doncaster Rovers for the remainder of the 2016–17 season. He was in the starting line-up against Stevenage on the same day, and opened up his goal account on 21 January by lashing a shot to the bottom corner from 18 yards (16 m) out, the first in a 3–1 victory over Crewe Alexandra. Rovers manager Darren Ferguson said Grant was "disappointing" in his second spell at the club, despite him starting twenty matches as Doncaster secured a League Two automatic promotion spot. Ferguson had initially talked of an agreement with Everton to sign Grant on a permanent deal in the summer, with reports indicating only personal terms had yet to be agreed.

On 30 August 2017, Grant signed for Crewe Alexandra on loan until 10 January 2018, and made his Crewe debut on 2 September against Grimsby Town but was stretchered off after 18 minutes following a head injury, and missed the next game as a result of the concussion suffered. Manager David Artell decided against extending his loan spell in January, having limited the midfielder to 14 starts and four substitute appearances. He was released from Everton without having made a first-team appearance, having retained the #39 shirt throughout his five years as a professional at Goodison Park.

=== Plymouth Argyle ===
On 7 June 2018, Grant signed for League One side Plymouth Argyle after his contract with Everton had expired. Manager Derek Adams had attempted to sign him six months earlier, but the deal was thwarted by a FIFA rule that prevented players from appearing for more than two teams in a single season. The 2018–19 season was poor both on an individual and a club level as injuries kept him sidelined for long spells and Argyle were relegated on goal difference. On 28 September 2019, he scored his first goal for the club with a "blockbuster 30 yards (27 m) finish" in a 1–0 away win at Mansfield Town in League Two. The goal, which later finished second in the club's Goal of the Season poll, was credited with starting Plymouth's promotion charge following an indifferent start to the campaign. He signed a new contract of undisclosed length in June 2020.

He was voted as Argyle's Player of the Month for September 2020 by Plymouth Live readers, having formed an effective triumvirate with Danny Mayor and Lewis Macleod in the centre of the pitch. The following month he won the club's Player of the Month award and was nominated for League One's PFA Fans' Player of the Month award after scoring three goals in consecutive home matches against Burton Albion, Bolton Wanderers and Ipswich Town and also picking up an assist. He spent most of the 2020–21 season playing at wing-back, where he scored four goals and provided twelve assists in 46 games. His goal at Milton Keynes Dons on 16 March earned him the League One Goal of the Month award, whilst his strike at AFC Wimbledon on 19 September was voted as the club's Goal of the Season, and a free kick against Swindon Town was shortlisted for the League One Goal of the Month award. He signed a two-year contract extension in the summer to become the longest-serving senior player at Home Park, as well as the only one to have not been signed by manager Ryan Lowe.

Grant underwent surgery on his groin in summer 2022, returning to fitness in September. He played nine games before tearing a thigh muscle two months later, which required surgery and kept him out of action for five months; he marked his return to fitness with a goal in a 2–0 win at Accrington Stanley on 21 March. He was released by the club at the end of the 2022–23 season, following Argyle's promotion to the Championship as League One champions. Manager Steven Schumacher said that "my head had to sort of rule my heart" as injuries had limited Grant to just three starts during the campaign.

=== Port Vale ===
On 27 June 2023, Grant agreed a two-year deal with League One side Port Vale to start on 1 July; manager Andy Crosby praised his technical ability, footballing experience and personal drive. On 7 October, Grant sustained a calf injury in a 2–0 defeat at Portsmouth that would keep him out of action for around eight weeks. Injuries restricted him to 20 league starts in the 2023–24 relegation season. He also missed the start of the 2024–25 season due to injury. He made his first start of the season on 22 October, in a 1–0 win at Harrogate Town. He departed Vale Park following a mutual termination of his contract on 3 February 2025 after 44 appearances for the Valiants.

=== Accrington Stanley ===
On 7 February 2025, Grant joined League Two side Accrington Stanley on a short-term contract for the remainder of the 2024–25 season, where assistant manager Ged Brannan said "you can never have enough experienced midfielders and he will make us stronger". He said he had left the Vale to join the relegation-threatened "Reds" because had been craving first-team football. He made six starts and ten substitute appearances and signed a new one-year contract in the summer. He played 28 games in the 2025–26 season, triggering an extension to his contract.

== Style of play ==
Grant is a left-footed midfielder who has been noted for his professionalism. He is also capable of playing as a left-sided wing-back. Commentators have highlighted his proficiency in set pieces and long-range shooting.

== Personal life ==
His uncle is former Everton and Burnley midfielder Tony Grant.

== Career statistics ==
As of match played 2 May 2026

Appearances and goals by club, season and competition
Club	Season	League			National cup (Note: Includes FA Cup, Scottish Cup)		League cup (Note: Includes Football League Cup, Scottish League Cup)		Other		Total	
Club	Season	Division	Apps	Goals	Apps	Goals	Apps	Goals	Apps	Goals	Apps	Goals
Everton	2014–15	Premier League	0	0	0	0	0	0	0	0	0	0
Everton	2015–16	Premier League	0	0	0	0	0	0	—		0	0
Everton	2016–17	Premier League	0	0	0	0	0	0	—		0	0
Everton	2017–18	Premier League	0	0	0	0	0	0	—		0	0
Everton	Total		0	0	0	0	0	0	0	0	0	0
Motherwell (loan)	2014–15	Scottish Premiership	12	1	—		—		1 (Note: Appearance in Scottish Premiership play-offs)	0	13	1
Doncaster Rovers (loan)	2015–16	League One	19	2	3	2	—		—		22	4
Ipswich Town (loan)	2016–17	Championship	6	0	0	0	1	0	—		7	0
Doncaster Rovers (loan)	2016–17	League Two	21	1	0	0	0	0	0	0	21	1
Everton U23	2017–18	—	—		—		—		1 (Note: Appearance(s) in EFL Trophy)	0	1	0
Crewe Alexandra (loan)	2017–18	League Two	17	0	1	0	—		0	0	18	0
Plymouth Argyle	2018–19	League One	10	0	1	0	2	0	2	0	15	0
Plymouth Argyle	2019–20	League Two	17	2	2	0	2	0	1	0	22	2
Plymouth Argyle	2020–21	League One	38	4	4	0	2	0	2	0	46	4
Plymouth Argyle	2021–22	League One	38	7	4	0	1	0	0	0	43	7
Plymouth Argyle	2022–23	League One	9	1	1	0	0	0	1	0	11	1
Plymouth Argyle	Total		112	14	12	0	7	0	6	0	137	14
Port Vale	2023–24	League One	30	0	2	0	3	0	2	0	37	0
Port Vale	2024–25	League Two	4	0	1	0	0	0	2	0	7	0
Port Vale	Total		34	0	3	0	3	0	4	0	44	0
Accrington Stanley	2024–25	League Two	16	0	—		—		—		16	0
Accrington Stanley	2025–26	League Two	25	0	2	0	0	0	1	0	28	0
Accrington Stanley	2026–27	League Two	0	0	0	0	0	0	0	0	0	0
Accrington Stanley	Total		41	0	2	0	0	0	1	0	44	0
Career total			262	18	21	2	11	0	13	0	307	20

== Honours ==
Doncaster Rovers

- EFL League Two third-place promotion: 2016–17

Plymouth Argyle

- EFL League Two third-place promotion: 2019–20
- EFL League One: 2022–23
