= Mitchell Lund =

English footballer (born 1996)

Personal information
- Full name: Mitchell Perry Lund
- Date of birth: 27 August 1996 (age 30)
- Place of birth: Kippax, England
- Height: 1.85 m (6 ft 1 in)
- Position: Defender

Team information
- Current team: Bradford (Park Avenue)

Youth career
- –2014: Doncaster Rovers

Senior career*
Years	Team	Apps	(Gls)
2014–2019	Doncaster Rovers	40	(1)
2017	→ Wrexham (loan)	4	(0)
2017–2018	→ Morecambe (loan)	10	(0)
2019–	Bradford (Park Avenue)		
- * Club domestic league appearances and goals as of 12:17, 21 August 2018 (UTC)

Mitchell Perry Lund (born 13 June 1996) is an English footballer who plays as a right back for Bradford (Park Avenue).

== Career ==
=== Doncaster Rovers ===
After coming through Doncaster Rovers's youth system, he signed his first professional contract in May 2014. He made his official début on 7 October 2014 in a 3–0 away victory over Burton Albion in the Football League Trophy, in which he was a member of the starting line-up.

==== Wrexham ====
On 1 February 2017, Lund joined Wrexham on an initial one-month loan deal. He was signed in order to provide cover for James Jennings who was due to face an FAW disciplinary panel over a clash during a match against Chester and was expected to receive a ban. However, the panel was delayed, which led manager Dean Keates to allow Lund to return to Doncaster, having made 4 appearances for the side, in order to hand opportunities to youth players.

==== Morecambe ====
On 3 July 2017, Lund signed for Morecambe on a season-long loan.

== Career statistics ==
As of match played 2 September 2017

Appearances and goals by club, season and competition
Club	Season	League			FA Cup		League Cup		Other		Total	
Club	Season	Division	Apps	Goals	Apps	Goals	Apps	Goals	Apps	Goals	Apps	Goals
Doncaster Rovers	2014–15	League One	4	0	0	0	0	0	1 (Note: Appearances in the Football League Trophy)	0	5	0
Doncaster Rovers	2015–16	League One	30	1	2	1	1	0	1	0	34	2
Doncaster Rovers	2016–17	League Two	5	0	0	0	0	0	0	0	5	0
Doncaster Rovers	Total		40	1	2	1	1	0	2	0	45	2
Wrexham (loan)	2016–17	National League	4	0	0	0	0	0	0	0	4	0
Morecambe (loan)	2017–18	League Two	10	0	1	0	1	0	3	0	15	0
Career total			54	1	3	1	2	0	5	0	63	2
