= Paul McKay (footballer, born 1996) =

Scottish footballer

Personal information
- Full name: Paul McKay
- Date of birth: 19 November 1996 (age 29)
- Place of birth: Glasgow, Scotland
- Height: 6 ft 2 in (1.88 m)
- Position: Centre back

Team information
- Current team: Jersey Bulls

Youth career
- 2006–2014: Doncaster Rovers

Senior career*
Years	Team	Apps	(Gls)
2014–2016	Doncaster Rovers	0	(0)
2015	→ Ilkeston FC (loan)		
2015	→ Gainsborough Trinity (loan)	4	(1)
2016–2017	Leeds United	0	(0)
2018–2019	Cardiff City	0	(0)
2019	→ Morecambe (loan)	7	(0)
2019–2021	Airdrieonians	47	(4)
2021–2024	Queen of the South	72	(3)
2024	Clyde	15	(0)
2025–	Jersey Bulls		
- * Club domestic league appearances and goals as of 31 May 2025

Paul McKay (born 19 November 1996) is a Scottish professional footballer who played as a centre back for Jersey Bulls. McKay has previously played for Doncaster Rovers, Leeds United, Cardiff City, Airdrieonians, Queen of the South and Clyde. McKay has also had loan spells with Ilkeston, Gainsborough Trinity and Morecambe.

McKay was born in Glasgow and played youth football with the Doncaster Rovers Academy as well as studying at Hill House School, before starting his professional career with the club.

== Club career ==
=== Doncaster Rovers ===
On 1 September 2015, McKay made his professional debut for Doncaster Rovers in a first round win in the Football League Trophy versus Burton Albion. McKay started the match that the club won 5–3 on penalties after a goalless draw.

==== Ilkeston FC (loan) ====
In October 2015, McKay and his twin brother Jack went out on loan to Ilkeston to gain first-team experience.

=== Leeds United ===
On 11 January 2016, McKay and his brother Jack both signed for Leeds United for undisclosed fees on two-and-a-half-year contracts under then head coach Steve Evans.

During the pre-season of the 2016-17, McKay was involved in the first-team squad, playing regularly in pre-season due to the departure of centre-back Giuseppe Bellusci and the injury to Liam Cooper.

On 29 January 2017, McKay made his Leeds debut versus Sutton United in the FA Cup.

On 17 December 2017, McKay and his brother Jack ended their contracts by mutual consent.

=== Cardiff City ===
On 22 January 2018, McKay signed for Cardiff City on a two-and-a-half-year contract after an extended trial with the club.

In January 2019, McKay was loaned out to League Two club Morecambe for the remainder of the 2018-19 season.

=== Airdrieonians ===
In July 2019, McKay signed for Scottish League One club Airdrieonians. where he primarily played as a midfielder until his departure on 31 May 2021.

=== Queen of the South ===
On 9 June 2021, McKay signed a one-year deal with Scottish Championship club Queen of the South.

On 23 February 2022, McKay extended his deal to remain at the Doonhamers for another two seasons until the summer of 2024.

On 27 August 2022, McKay was sent-off for violent conduct in the 84th minute, in a 3–1 defeat away to Falkirk in Scottish League One.

=== Jersey Bulls ===
On 6 February 2025 McKay signed for Combined Counties League Premier Division South Club Jersey Bulls.

== Personal life ==
McKay's father Willie McKay and his older brother Mark are both football agents. His twin brother, Jack McKay is also a professional footballer.

== Career statistics ==
As of 22 September 2023

Appearances and goals by club, season and competition
Club	Season	League			National Cup		League Cup		Other		Total	
Club	Season	Division	Apps	Goals	Apps	Goals	Apps	Goals	Apps	Goals	Apps	Goals
Doncaster Rovers	2014–15	League One	0	0	0	0	0	0	0	0	0	0
Doncaster Rovers	2015–16	League One	0	0	0	0	0	0	1	0	1	0
Doncaster Rovers	Total		0	0	0	0	0	0	1	0	1	0
Gainsborough Trinity (loan)	2015–16	National League North	4	1	0	0	—		0	0	4	1
Leeds United	2016–17	Championship	0	0	1	0	0	0	—		1	0
Leeds United	2017–18	Championship	0	0	0	0	0	0	—		0	0
Leeds United	Total		0	0	1	0	0	0	—		1	0
Cardiff City	2017–18	Championship	0	0	0	0	0	0	—		0	0
Cardiff City	2018–19	Premier League	0	0	0	0	0	0	—		0	0
Cardiff City	Total		0	0	0	0	0	0	—		0	0
Morecambe (loan)	2018–19	League Two	7	0	0	0	0	0	0	0	7	0
Airdrieonians	2019–20	Scottish League One	26	4	2	0	0	0	3	0	31	4
Airdrieonians	2020-21	Scottish League One	24	0	1	0	4	1	3	0	32	1
Airdrieonians	Total		50	4	3	0	4	1	6	0	63	5
Queen of the South	2021-22	Scottish Championship	16	0	2	0	1	0	3	0	22	0
Queen of the South	2022-23	Scottish League One	26	1	1	0	3	0	2	0	32	1
Queen of the South	2023-24	Scottish League One	5	0	0	0	4	1	1	0	10	1
Queen of the South	Total		47	1	3	0	8	1	6	0	64	2
Career total			108	6	7	0	12	2	13	0	140	8
