= Eddy Lecygne =

French footballer (born 1996)

Personal information
- Date of birth: 6 August 1996 (age 30)
- Place of birth: Pabu, France
- Position: Midfielder

Youth career
- 2004–2007: Guingamp
- 2007–2011: Rennes
- 2011–2012: Lamballe
- 2012–2016: Stoke City

Senior career*
Years	Team	Apps	(Gls)
2016–2018	Stoke City	0	(0)
2016	→ Doncaster Rovers (loan)	1	(0)
2018–	Lamballe		

International career^{‡}
2014	France U19	3	(0)
- * Club domestic league appearances and goals as of 00:00, 27 January 2016 (UTC) ‡ National team caps and goals as of 20:50, 27 January 2016 (UTC)

Eddy Lecygne (born 6 August 1996) is a French professional footballer who plays as a midfielder for Lamballe.

== Career ==
Lecygne joined Premier League club Stoke City in early 2012 after previously playing in the youth teams at Guingamp, Rennes and Lamballe. He joined League One side Doncaster Rovers on a one-month loan deal on 25 January 2016. He made his debut in the Football League the following day, in a 2–1 defeat to Port Vale at the Keepmoat Stadium. Lecygne was released by Stoke in June 2018.

After release from Stoke, Lecygne returned to France and joined Régional 1 side Lamballe.

== Career statistics ==
Appearances and goals by club, season and competition
Club	Season	League			FA Cup		League Cup		Other		Total	
Club	Season	Division	Apps	Goals	Apps	Goals	Apps	Goals	Apps	Goals	Apps	Goals
Stoke City	2015–16	Premier League	0	0	0	0	0	0	0	0	0	0
Doncaster Rovers (loan)	2015–16	League One	1	0	0	0	0	0	0	0	1	0
Stoke City U23	2016–17	—	—		—		—		2 (Note: Appearances in EFL Trophy)	0	2	0
Career total			1	0	0	0	0	0	2	0	3	0
