= 2015–16 Doncaster Rovers F.C. season =

Doncaster Rovers F.C.
2015–16 season
- Chairman: David Blunt
- Manager: Paul Dickov (until 8 September 2015) Rob Jones (Interim) Darren Ferguson (from 16 October 2015)
- Stadium: Keepmoat Stadium
- League One: 21st (relegated)
- FA Cup: Third round (vs. Stoke City)
- League Cup: Second round (vs. Ipswich Town)
- JP Trophy: Second round (vs. York City)
- Top goalscorer: League: Andy Williams (12); All: Andy Williams (16)
- Highest home attendance: 13,299 vs Stoke City (FA Cup, 9 Jan 16)
- Lowest home attendance: 2,956 vs Burton Albion (JP Trophy, 1 Sep 15)
- Average home league attendance: 6,553
Home colours	Away colours

The 2015–16 season was Doncaster Rovers's 137th season in their existence, 13th consecutive season in the Football League and second consecutive season in League One. Along with League One, the club also competed in the FA Cup, League Cup and JP Trophy. The season covered the period from 1 July 2015 to 30 June 2016.

== Squad ==
=== Detailed Overview ===
Caps and goals up to the start of season 2015–16. Players in bold were signed in the January window.

No.	Name	Position (s)	Nationality	Place of birth	Date of birth (age)	Club caps	Club goals	Int. caps	Int. goals	Signed from
Goalkeepers
12	Thorsten Stuckmann	GK	(Germany)	Gütersloh	17 March 1981 (age 45)	–	–	–	–	Preston North End
23	Marko Maroši	GK	(Slovakia)		23 October 1993 (age 33)	4	0	–	–	Wigan Athletic
40	Louis Jones	GK	(England)	Doncaster	12 October 1998 (age 28)	–	–	–	–	Academy
Defenders
2	Mitchell Lund	RB	(England)	Leeds	27 August 1996 (age 30)	5	0	–	–	Academy
3	Cedric Evina	LB/LM	(France)	Cameroon	16 November 1991 (age 34)	24	0	–	–	Charlton Athletic
4	Luke McCullough	CB/RB/DM	(Northern Ireland)	Portadown	15 February 1994 (age 32)	56	1	4	0	Manchester United
5	Rob Jones	CB	(England)	Stockton-on-Tees	3 November 1979 (age 47)	74	11	–	–	Sheffield Wednesday
6	Andy Butler	CB	(England)	Doncaster	4 November 1983 (age 43)	38	3	–	–	Sheffield United
17	Gary MacKenzie	CB	(Scotland)	Lanark	15 October 1985 (age 41)	–	–	–	–	Blackpool
20	Aaron Taylor-Sinclair	LB/LM	(Scotland)	Aberdeen	8 April 1991 (age 35)	–	–	–	–	Wigan Athletic
24	Paul McKay	CB	(Scotland)	Glasgow	19 November 1996 (age 29)	4	0	–	–	Academy
33	Michael Carberry		(England)	Liverpool	5 March 1998 (age 28)	–	–	–	–	Academy
**38**	**Craig Alcock**	RB/LB/CB	**(England)**	**Truro**	**8 December 1987 (age 38)**	–	–	–	–	**Sheffield United**
39	Kevin Mbuti		(Democratic Republic of the Congo)		31 December 1997 (age 28)	–	–	–	–	Academy
Midfielders
7	Richie Wellens	CM/DM/AM	(England)	Moston	26 March 1980 (age 46)	183	15	–	–	Leicester City
8	Richard Chaplow	CM/RM/LM	(England)	Accrington	2 February 1985 (age 41)	–	–	–	–	Millwall
18	Paul Keegan	CM	(Republic of Ireland)	Dublin	5 July 1984 (age 42)	117	1	–	–	(Republic of Ireland) Bohemians
26	James Coppinger	RM/CM/RB	(England)	Guisborough	10 January 1981 (age 45)	449	47	–	–	Exeter City
29	Harry Middleton	CM/AM	(England)	Doncaster	12 April 1995 (age 31)	7	0	–	–	Academy
32	Billy Whitehouse	CM/LM	(England)	Doncaster	13 June 1996 (age 30)	7	0	–	–	Academy
34	Matty Davies		(England)	Worksop	19 September 1996 (age 30)	–	–	–	–	Academy
36	Jordan Linley		(England)	Doncaster	23 January 1998 (age 28)	–	–	–	–	Academy
Forwards
9	Curtis Main	CF	(England)	South Shields	20 June 1992 (age 34)	44	10	–	–	Middlesbrough
10	Harry Forrester	LW/RW/SS	(England)	Milton Keynes	2 January 1991 (age 35)	57	10	–	–	Brentford
11	Andy Williams	CF/RW	(England)	Hereford	14 August 1986 (age 40)	–	–	–	–	Swindon Town
14	Nathan Tyson	CF/LW	(England)	Reading	4 May 1982 (age 44)	44	14	–	–	Blackpool
15	Dany N'Guessan	CF/LW/RW	(France)	Ivry-sur-Seine	11 August 1987 (age 39)	–	–	–	–	(Greece) AEL
19	Jack McKay	CF	(Scotland)	Glasgow	19 November 1996 (age 29)	4	0	–	–	Academy
21	Liam Mandeville	CF	(England)	Lincoln	17 February 1997 (age 29)	3	0	–	–	Academy
25	Joe Pugh		(Wales)	Doncaster, England	10 October 1997 (age 29)	–	–	–	–	Academy
41	Will Longbottom		(England)	Leeds	12 December 1998 (age 27)	–	–	–	–	Academy

=== Statistics ===
This includes any players featured in a match day squad in any competition.

As of 8 May 2016

No.	Pos	Nat	Player	Total		League One		FA Cup		League Cup		League Trophy	
No.	Pos	Nat	Player	Apps	Goals	Apps	Goals	Apps	Goals	Apps	Goals	Apps	Goals
2	DF	(England) ENG	Mitchell Lund	34	2	25+5	1	2	1	0+1	0	1	0
3	DF	(France) FRA	Cedric Evina	49	1	38+4	1	3	0	2	0	2	0
4	DF	(Northern Ireland) NIR	Luke McCullough	35	0	28+4	0	1	0	2	0	0	0
6	DF	(England) ENG	Andy Butler	47	4	40	4	3	0	2	0	2	0
7	FW	(England) ENG	Gary McSheffrey (on loan from Scunthorpe United)	7	1	7	1	0	0	0	0	0	0
8	MF	(England) ENG	Richard Chaplow	30	2	20+7	2	0+1	0	1	0	0+1	0
10	FW	(United States) USA	Lynden Gooch (on loan from Sunderland)	10	0	7+3	0	0	0	0	0	0	0
11	FW	(England) ENG	Andy Williams	53	16	41+5	12	3	2	2	2	1+1	0
12	GK	(Germany) GER	Thorsten Stuckmann	43	0	35+1	0	3	0	2	0	2	0
14	FW	(England) ENG	Nathan Tyson	36	7	22+10	6	3	1	0+1	0	0	0
15	FW	(France) FRA	Dany N'Guessan	9	0	1+7	0	0	0	0	0	1	0
17	DF	(Scotland) SCO	Gary MacKenzie	16	0	11+4	0	0+1	0	0	0	0	0
18	MF	(Ireland) EIR	Paul Keegan	18	1	11+4	1	1+1	0	0	0	1	0
20	DF	(Scotland) SCO	Aaron Taylor-Sinclair	49	2	38+5	2	3	0	2	0	1	0
21	FW	(England) ENG	Liam Mandeville	10	1	2+6	1	0	0	0	0	1+1	0
22	MF	(England) ENG	Conor Grant (on loan from Everton)	22	4	18+1	2	3	2	0	0	0	0
23	GK	(Slovakia) SVK	Marko Maroši	2	0	0+1	0	0	0	0	0	0+1	0
24	MF	(England) ENG	Tommy Rowe (on loan from Wolverhampton Wanderers)	10	3	9+1	3	0	0	0	0	0	0
25	FW	(Wales) WAL	Joe Pugh	0	0	0	0	0	0	0	0	0	0
26	MF	(England) ENG	James Coppinger	44	3	38+1	3	2	0	2	0	1	0
27	FW	(England) ENG	Cameron Stewart (on loan from Ipswich Town)	28	4	11+15	4	0+1	0	0	0	1	0
29	MF	(England) ENG	Harry Middleton	41	0	24+10	0	3	0	1+1	0	2	0
32	MF	(England) ENG	Billy Whitehouse	4	0	0+2	0	0	0	0+1	0	1	0
33	DF	(England) ENG	Michael Carberry	0	0	0	0	0	0	0	0	0	0
34	MF	(England) ENG	Matty Davies	0	0	0	0	0	0	0	0	0	0
36	MF	(England) ENG	Jordan Linley	0	0	0	0	0	0	0	0	0	0
37	MF	(England) ENG	Riccardo Calder (on loan from Aston Villa)	12	0	7+5	0	0	0	0	0	0	0
38	DF	(England) ENG	Craig Alcock	29	0	24+3	0	2	0	0	0	0	0
39	DF	(Democratic Republic of the Congo) COD	Kevin Mbuti	0	0	0	0	0	0	0	0	0	0
40	GK	(England) ENG	Louis Jones	0	0	0	0	0	0	0	0	0	0
41	FW	(England) ENG	Will Longbottom	1	0	0+1	0	0	0	0	0	0	0
42	GK	(England) ENG	Remi Matthews (on loan from Norwich City)	9	0	9	0	0	0	0	0	0	0
Players who left the club during the season:
5	DF	(England) ENG	Rob Jones	4	0	2	0	0	0	2	0	0	0
7	MF	(England) ENG	Richie Wellens	16	0	11+1	0	0+1	0	2	0	1	0
7	MF	(France) FRA	Eddy Lecygne (on loan from Stoke City)	1	0	0+1	0	0	0	0	0	0	0
9	FW	(England) ENG	Curtis Main	14	1	6+4	1	0+1	0	1+1	0	1	0
10	FW	(England) ENG	Harry Forrester	9	1	3+4	1	0	0	1	0	0+1	0
16	MF	(England) ENG	Oscar Gobern (on loan from Queens Park Rangers)	5	0	4+1	0	0	0	0	0	0	0
19	FW	(Scotland) SCO	Jack McKay	0	0	0	0	0	0	0	0	0	0
24	DF	(Scotland) SCO	Paul McKay	1	0	0	0	0	0	0	0	1	0
25	FW	(England) ENG	Keshi Anderson (on loan from Crystal Palace)	9	3	5+2	3	0+1	0	0	0	1	0
31	MF	(England) ENG	James Horsfield (on loan from Manchester City)	3	0	2	0	0	0	0	0	1	0
37	DF	(Brazil) BRA	Felipe Mattioni (on loan from Everton)	6	0	5	0	1	0	0	0	0	0
40	GK	(England) ENG	Chris Neal (on loan from Port Vale)	2	0	2	0	0	0	0	0	0	0

==== Goals record ====
Rank	No.	Po.	Name	League One	FA Cup	League Cup	League Trophy	Total
1	11	FW	Andy Williams	12	2	2	0	16
2	14	FW	Nathan Tyson	6	1	0	0	7
3	6	DF	Andy Butler	4	0	0	0	4
3	22	MF	Conor Grant	2	2	0	0	4
3	27	FW	Cameron Stewart	4	0	0	0	4
6	24	MF	Tommy Rowe	3	0	0	0	3
6	25	FW	Keshi Anderson	3	0	0	0	3
6	26	MF	James Coppinger	3	0	0	0	3
9	2	DF	Mitchell Lund	1	1	0	0	2
9	8	MF	Richard Chaplow	2	0	0	0	2
9	20	DF	Aaron Taylor-Sinclair	2	0	0	0	2
12	3	DF	Cedric Evina	1	0	0	0	1
12	7	FW	Gary McSheffrey	1	0	0	0	1
12	9	FW	Curtis Main	1	0	0	0	1
12	10	FW	Harry Forrester	1	0	0	0	1
12	18	MF	Paul Keegan	1	0	0	0	1
12	21	FW	Liam Mandeville	1	0	0	0	1
Total				48	6	2	0	56

==== Disciplinary record ====
No.	Pos.	Name	League One			FA Cup			League Cup			League Trophy			Total		
No.	Pos.	Name	Yellow card	(yellow card) (yellow-red card)	Red card	Yellow card	(yellow card) (yellow-red card)	Red card	Yellow card	(yellow card) (yellow-red card)	Red card	Yellow card	(yellow card) (yellow-red card)	Red card	Yellow card	(yellow card) (yellow-red card)	Red card
2	DF	Mitchell Lund	7	0	0	0	0	0	0	0	0	0	0	0	7	0	0
3	DF	Cedric Evina	1	0	0	0	0	0	0	0	0	1	0	0	2	0	0
4	DF	Luke McCullough	3	0	0	0	0	0	0	0	0	0	0	0	3	0	0
6	DF	Andy Butler	5	0	0	0	0	0	0	0	0	0	0	0	5	0	0
7	MF	Richie Wellens	2	0	0	0	0	0	0	0	0	0	0	0	2	0	0
7	FW	Gary McSheffrey	1	0	0	0	0	0	0	0	0	0	0	0	1	0	0
8	MF	Richard Chaplow	8	1	0	0	0	0	1	0	0	0	0	0	9	1	0
9	FW	Curtis Main	0	0	0	0	0	0	1	0	0	0	0	0	1	0	0
10	FW	Harry Forrester	0	0	0	0	0	0	0	0	0	1	0	0	1	0	0
10	FW	Lynden Gooch	1	0	0	0	0	0	0	0	0	0	0	0	1	0	0
11	FW	Andy Williams	4	0	0	0	0	0	0	0	0	0	0	0	4	0	0
12	GK	Thorsten Stuckmann	1	0	0	0	0	0	0	0	0	0	0	0	1	0	0
14	FW	Nathan Tyson	0	0	0	1	0	0	0	0	0	0	0	0	1	0	0
17	DF	Gary MacKenzie	0	0	1	0	0	0	0	0	0	0	0	0	0	0	1
18	MF	Paul Keegan	1	0	0	0	0	0	0	0	0	0	0	0	1	0	0
22	MF	Conor Grant	2	0	0	1	0	0	0	0	0	0	0	0	3	0	0
25	FW	Keshi Anderson	1	0	0	0	0	0	0	0	0	0	0	0	1	0	0
26	MF	James Coppinger	2	0	0	1	0	0	0	0	0	0	0	0	3	0	0
27	FW	Cameron Stewart	1	0	0	0	0	0	0	0	0	0	0	0	1	0	0
29	MF	Harry Middleton	3	0	0	0	0	0	0	0	0	0	0	0	3	0	0
31	MF	James Horsfield	1	0	0	0	0	0	0	0	0	0	0	0	1	0	0
38	DF	Craig Alcock	3	1	0	0	0	0	0	0	0	0	0	0	3	1	0
Total			47	2	1	3	0	0	2	0	0	2	0	0	54	2	1

== Transfers ==
=== Transfers in ===
Date from	Position	Nationality	Name	From	Fee	Ref.
10 June 2015	GK	GER	Thorsten Stuckmann	Preston North End	Free transfer	
19 June 2015	FW	ENG	Andy Williams	Swindon Town	Free transfer	
30 June 2015	DF	SCO	Gary MacKenzie	Blackpool	Free transfer	
6 July 2015	MF	ENG	Richard Chaplow	Millwall	Free transfer	
20 July 2015	DF	SCO	Aaron Taylor-Sinclair	Wigan Athletic	Free transfer	
30 July 2015	FW	FRA	Dany N'Guessan	(Greece) AEL	Free transfer	
7 January 2016	DF	ENG	Craig Alcock	Sheffield United	Undisclosed	

=== Loans in ===
Date from	Position	Nationality	Name	From	Date until	Ref.
28 August 2015	FW	ENG	Cameron Stewart	Ipswich Town	8 May 2016	
1 September 2015	MF	ENG	Oscar Gobern	Queens Park Rangers	4 January 2016	
24 September 2015	FW	ENG	Keshi Anderson	Crystal Palace	2 January 2016	
28 September 2015	MF	ENG	James Horsfield	Manchester City	27 October 2015	
29 October 2015	MF	ENG	Conor Grant	Everton	8 May 2016	
31 October 2015	DF	BRA	Felipe Mattioni	Everton	2 January 2016	
10 November 2015	DF	ENG	Craig Alcock	Sheffield United	2 January 2016	
21 January 2016	FW	USA	Lynden Gooch	Sunderland	8 May 2016	
25 January 2016	MF	FRA	Eddy Lecygne	Stoke City	25 February 2016	
1 February 2016	GK	ENG	Chris Neal	Port Vale	1 March 2016	
3 March 2016	MF	ENG	Riccardo Calder	Aston Villa	8 May 2016	
19 March 2016	MF	ENG	Tommy Rowe	Wolverhampton Wanderers	8 May 2016	
23 March 2016	FW	ENG	Gary McSheffrey	Scunthorpe United	8 May 2016	
24 March 2016	GK	ENG	Remi Matthews	Norwich City	8 May 2016	

=== Loans out ===
Date from	Position	Nationality	Name	To	Date until	Ref.
2 September 2015	DF	ENG	Ben Askins	Whitby Town	29 September 2015	
2 October 2015	FW	SCO	Jack McKay	Ilkeston	2 November 2015	
8 October 2015	DF	SCO	Paul McKay	Ilkeston	8 November 2015	
9 November 2015	FW	ENG	Liam Mandeville	Whitby Town	9 December 2015	
26 November 2015	MF	ENG	Richie Wellens	Oldham Athletic	2 January 2016	
1 February 2016	DF	SCO	Gary MacKenzie	Notts County	1 March 2016	
13 February 2016	MF	ENG	Billy Whitehouse	FC Halifax Town	13 March 2016	
15 February 2016	FW	ENG	Curtis Main	Oldham Athletic	8 May 2016	

=== Transfers out ===
Date to	Position	Nationality	Name	To	Fee	Ref.
21 May 2015	FW	ENG	Kyle Bennett	Portsmouth	Free transfer	
11 July 2015	FW	ENG	Alex Peterson	Scarborough Athletic	Free transfer	
7 August 2015	DF	ENG	Jamie McCombe	Stevenage	Free transfer	
7 August 2015	DF	ENG	Liam Wakefield	Accrington Stanley	Free transfer	
15 August 2015	DF	ENG	Reece Wabara	Barnsley	Free transfer	
18 August 2015	MF	RSA	Dean Furman	(South Africa) SuperSport United	Free transfer	
28 August 2015	FW	JAM	Theo Robinson	(Scotland) Motherwell	Free transfer	
4 September 2015	GK	ENG	Stephen Bywater	(India) Kerala Blasters	Free transfer	
8 October 2015	MF	ENG	Lewis Ferguson	Scarborough Athletic	Free transfer	
31 December 2015	FW	ENG	Harry Forrester	(Scotland) Rangers	Undisclosed	
8 January 2016	MF	ENG	Richie Wellens	Shrewsbury Town	Free transfer	
11 January 2016	FW	SCO	Jack McKay	Leeds United	Undisclosed	
11 January 2016	DF	SCO	Paul McKay	Leeds United	Undisclosed	
3 March 2016	DF	ENG	Rob Jones	Hartlepool United	Free transfer	
31 March 2016	MF	CIV	Abdul Razak	(Sweden) AFC United	Free transfer	

== Competitions ==
=== Pre–season friendlies ===
On 26 May 2015, Doncaster Rovers announced Sunderland will visit during pre–season in a friendly. A day later it was announced Wolverhampton Wanderers will visit as part of their pre–season preparations. The club announced on 28 May 2015 they will host Nottingham Forest on 21 July 2015. On 5 June 2015, Doncaster Rovers confirmed they will kick–off pre–season preparations off with a trip to Frickley Athletic. On 8 June 2015, a home friendly against Middlesbrough was announced.

8 July 2015 Friendly	Frickley Athletic	0–2	Doncaster Rovers	South Elmsall
19:45 BST		Report	Tyson 60', 90'	Stadium: Westfield Lane; Attendance: 651

21 July 2015 Friendly	Doncaster Rovers	1–1	Nottingham Forest	Doncaster
19:45 BST	Main 15'	Report	Burke 34'	Stadium: Keepmoat Stadium

22 July 2015 Friendly	Bridlington Town	0–2	Doncaster Rovers XI	Bridlington
19:45 BST		Report	Whitehouse 50'; Bell 89'	Stadium: Queensgate

25 July 2015 Friendly	Doncaster Rovers	0–0	Middlesbrough	Doncaster
15:00 BST		Report		Stadium: Keepmoat Stadium; Attendance: 2,831

27 July 2015 Friendly	Armthorpe Welfare	0–4	Doncaster Rovers XI	Armthorpe
19:45 BST		Report	Pugh 37', 54'; Whitehouse 68'; Bell 82'	Stadium: Welfare Ground

29 July 2015 Friendly	Doncaster Rovers	2–0	Sunderland	Doncaster
19:45 BST	Evina 15'; Forrester 61'	Report		Stadium: Keepmoat Stadium

1 August 2015 Friendly	Doncaster Rovers	3–4	Wolverhampton Wanderers	Doncaster
15:00 BST	Butler 19'; Jones 45'; Tyson 47'	Report	Afobe 21'; Graham 28'; Dicko 36'; Enobakhare 63'	Stadium: Keepmoat Stadium

=== League One ===
==== League table ====
Pos	Team	Pld	W	D	L	GF	GA	GD	Pts	Promotion, qualification or relegation
19	Fleetwood Town	46	12	15	19	52	56	−4	51	
20	Shrewsbury Town	46	13	11	22	58	79	−21	50	
21	Doncaster Rovers (R)	46	11	13	22	48	64	−16	46	Relegation to EFL League Two
22	Blackpool (R)	46	12	10	24	40	63	−23	46	Relegation to EFL League Two
23	Colchester United (R)	46	9	13	24	57	99	−42	40	Relegation to EFL League Two

Updated to match(es) played on 1 July 2016. Source: BBC Sport
Rules for classification: 1) Points; 2) Goal difference; 3) Number of goals scored
(R) Relegated

==== Matches ====
On 17 June 2015, the fixtures for the forthcoming season were announced.

8 August 2015 1	Doncaster Rovers	1–1	Bury	Doncaster
15:00 BST	Forrester 90+3'	Report	Clarke (yellow card) 73', (goal) 90+5'; Mellis (yellow card) 74'	Stadium: Keepmoat Stadium; Attendance: 6,429; Referee: Eddie Ilderton

16 August 2015 2	Wigan Athletic	0–0	Doncaster Rovers	Wigan
12:30 BST	Jacobs (yellow card) 86'; Morgan (yellow card) 90'	Report		Stadium: DW Stadium; Attendance: 8,813; Referee: David Webb

19 August 2015 3	Doncaster Rovers	0–0	Southend United	Doncaster
19:45 BST	Chaplow (yellow card) 64'	Report	Timlin (yellow card) 52'; Coker (yellow card) 90+1'	Stadium: Keepmoat Stadium; Attendance: 5,164; Referee: Seb Stockbridge

22 August 2015 4	Port Vale	3–0	Doncaster Rovers	Burslem
15:00 BST	Foley 35'; Ikpeazu 46'; Leitch-Smith (yellow card) 79'; Moore 88'	Report	Butler (yellow card) 28'; Stuckmann (yellow card) 79'; McCullough (yellow card) 90+2'	Stadium: Vale Park; Attendance: 4,775; Referee: Robert Lewis

29 August 2015 5	Doncaster Rovers	2–0	Fleetwood Town	Doncaster
15:00 BST	Coppinger 17'; Main 24'	Report	Jordan (yellow card) 20'; Ryan (yellow card) 39'; McLaughlin (yellow card) 90'	Stadium: Keepmoat Stadium; Attendance: 4,876; Referee: Trevor Kettle

5 September 2015 6	Gillingham	1–0	Doncaster Rovers	Gillingham
15:00 BST	Hessenthaler 66'	Report		Stadium: Priestfield Stadium; Attendance: 5,685; Referee: Chris Sarginson

12 September 2015 7	Walsall	2–0	Doncaster Rovers	Walsall
15:00 BST	Mantom (yellow card) 25'; Taylor (yellow card) 42'; Bradshaw 85', 90+2'	Report	Lund (yellow card) 75'; Keegan (yellow card) 89'	Stadium: Bescot Stadium; Attendance: 4,127; Referee: Kevin Wright

19 September 2015 8	Doncaster Rovers	1–1	Oldham Athletic	Doncaster
15:00 BST	Butler 26'	Report	Burn 34'; Jones (yellow card) 79'; Green (yellow card) 83'; Brown (yellow card) 87'	Stadium: Keepmoat Stadium; Attendance: 5,647; Referee: Andy Woolmer

26 September 2015 9	Sheffield United	3–1	Doncaster Rovers	Sheffield
15:00 BST	Basham 17', (yellow card) 60'; Sammon 35'; Adams (yellow card) 66'; Sharp 79'	Report	Stewart 25'; MacKenzie (red card) 38'	Stadium: Bramall Lane; Attendance: 20,869; Referee: Mark Heywood

29 September 2015 10	Doncaster Rovers	2–2	Swindon Town	Doncaster
19:45 BST	Horsfield (yellow card) 40'; Anderson 73'; Williams 80' (pen.); Chaplow (yellow card) 90+5'	Report	Branco (yellow card) 44'; Ajose 47'; Robert (yellow card) 63'; Thompson (yellow card) 76'; Obika 90+1'	Stadium: Keepmoat Stadium; Attendance: 4,693; Referee: Ben Toner

3 October 2015 11	Doncaster Rovers	2–1	Barnsley	Doncaster
15:00 BST	Anderson 35'; Wellens (yellow card) 72'; Chaplow 90', (yellow card) 90+1'	Report	Winnall 59'	Stadium: Keepmoat Stadium; Attendance: 9,033; Referee: Lee Mason

17 October 2015 12	Doncaster Rovers	0–1	Bradford City	Doncaster
15:00 BST	Anderson (yellow card) 25'	Report	Cole 1'	Stadium: Keepmoat Stadium; Attendance: 8,410; Referee: Dean Whitestone

20 October 2015 13	Shrewsbury Town	1–2	Doncaster Rovers	Shrewsbury
19:45 BST	Black (yellow card) 13'; Knight-Percival 27'	Report	Coppinger 14'; Lund (yellow card) 33'; Anderson 86'	Stadium: New Meadow; Attendance: 4,735; Referee: Kevin Johnson

24 October 2015 14	Peterborough United	4–0	Doncaster Rovers	Peterborough
15:00 BST	Zakuani 8'; Santos (yellow card) 34'; Oztumer 36'; Elder 46'; Washington 73'	Report	Wellens (yellow card) 2'; Lund (yellow card) 45+1'; Butler (yellow card) 78'	Stadium: London Road Stadium; Attendance: 6,092; Referee: Mark Brown

27 October 2015 15	Millwall	2–0	Doncaster Rovers	London
19:45 GMT	Morison 5', 8'; Thompson (yellow card) 81'; Craig (yellow card) 81'; Beevers (yellow card) 88'; L. Martin (yellow card) 90+2'	Report		Stadium: The Den; Attendance: 8,294; Referee: Charles Breakspear

31 October 2015 16	Doncaster Rovers	2–0	Colchester United	Doncaster
15:00 GMT	Grant 41'; Williams 64'	Report		Stadium: Keepmoat Stadium; Attendance: 5,324; Referee: Graham Salisbury

14 November 2015 17	Blackpool	0–2	Doncaster Rovers	Blackpool
15:00 GMT		Report	Williams 5'; Taylor-Sinclair 40'	Stadium: Bloomfield Road; Attendance: 17,435; Referee: Ross Joyce

21 November 2015 18	Doncaster Rovers	0–2	Rochdale	Doncaster
15:00 GMT	Williams (yellow card) 8'	Report	Cannon (yellow card) 23'; Henderson (yellow card) 34', (goal) 84', 90+6'; Rose (yellow card) 90+5'	Stadium: Keepmoat Stadium; Attendance: 6,125; Referee: Kevin Wright

24 November 2015 19	Doncaster Rovers	3–0	Chesterfield	Doncaster
19:45 GMT	Tyson 62'; Williams 70'; Coppinger (yellow card) 87'; Stewart 90+2'	Report	Wood (yellow card) 17'	Stadium: Keepmoat Stadium; Attendance: 5,521; Referee: Kevin Friend

28 November 2015 20	Coventry City	2–2	Doncaster Rovers	Coventry
15:00 GMT	Armstrong 30'; Fleck 59'	Report	McCullough (yellow card) 27'; Tyson 52', 72'; Grant (yellow card) 62'; Coppinger (yellow card) 68'; Williams (yellow card) 72'; Middleton (yellow card) 90+3'; Stewart (yellow card) 90+4'	Stadium: Ricoh Arena; Attendance: 11,885; Referee: Lee Swabey

12 December 2015 21	Doncaster Rovers	3–2	Crewe Alexandra	Doncaster
15:00 GMT	Grant 32'; Stewart 90+3'; Williams 90+5'	Report	Haber 26'; Jones (yellow card) 64'; Saunders 90'; Ajayi (yellow card) 90+3'	Stadium: Keepmoat Stadium; Attendance: 5,342; Referee: Darren Drysdale

19 December 2015 22	Burton Albion	3–3	Doncaster Rovers	Burton Upon Trent
15:00 GMT	Butcher 18', 61'; Mousinho (yellow card) 53'; Edwards (yellow card) 82'; Duffy 89'	Report	Williams 4'; Keegan 70'; Butler (yellow card) 72'; Tyson 83' (pen.)	Stadium: Pirelli Stadium; Attendance: 4,103; Referee: Mark Heywood

26 December 2015 23	Doncaster Rovers	0–1	Scunthorpe United	Doncaster
15:00 GMT		Report	Madden 20'; King (yellow card) 38'; Dawson (yellow card) 61'; Laird (yellow card) 90+1'	Stadium: Keepmoat Stadium; Attendance: 8,744; Referee: Stuart Attwell

28 December 2015 24	Oldham Athletic	1–2	Doncaster Rovers	Oldham
15:00 GMT	Yeates (yellow card) 68'; Eckersley (yellow card) 70'; Murphy 74'	Report	Williams 12', 45'; Alcock (yellow card) 17'	Stadium: Boundary Park; Attendance: 4,432; Referee: Ross Joyce

2 January 2015 25	Southend United	0–3	Doncaster Rovers	Southend-on-Sea
15:00 GMT	Leonard (yellow card) 50'; Thompson (yellow card) 57'; White (yellow card) 58'; Deegan (yellow card) 90+3'	Report	Williams 44'; Taylor–Sinclair 54'; Tyson 58' (pen.); Alcock (yellow card) 84'	Stadium: Roots Hall; Attendance: 7,134; Referee: Lee Collins

16 January 2015 26	Doncaster Rovers	2–2	Gillingham	Doncaster
15:00 GMT	Stewart 75'; Williams 88'	Report	Donnelly 9', 47'; Samuel (yellow card) 72'	Stadium: Keepmoat Stadium; Attendance: 6,077; Referee: Nigel Miller

23 January 2015 27	Fleetwood Town	0–0	Doncaster Rovers	Fleetwood
15:00 GMT	Pond (yellow card) 75'; Grant (yellow card) 88'; Davis (yellow card) 90+1'	Report	Gooch (yellow card) 75'; Evina (yellow card) 81'; Chaplow (yellow card) 90+3'	Stadium: Highbury Stadium; Attendance: 3,508; Referee: Peter Bankes

26 January 2015 28	Doncaster Rovers	1–2	Port Vale	Doncaster
19:45 GMT	Evina 88'	Report	Leitch-Smith 6', 65'; Kennedy (yellow card) 70'	Stadium: Keepmoat Stadium; Attendance: 4,799; Referee: Geoff Eltringham

2 February 2016 29	Doncaster Rovers	1–2	Walsall	Doncaster
19:45 GMT	Mandeville 80'	Report	Mantom 61'; Taylor 65'	Stadium: Keepmoat Stadium; Attendance: 5,056; Referee: Ben Toner

13 February 2016 30	Doncaster Rovers	0–1	Sheffield United	Doncaster
15:00 GMT	Alcock (yellow card) 60'	Report	Adams 42'; Hammond (yellow card) 68'	Stadium: Keepmoat Stadium; Attendance: 10,168; Referee: Mike Dean

20 February 2016 31	Barnsley	1–0	Doncaster Rovers	Barnsley
15:00 GMT	White (yellow card) 13'; Fletcher 81'	Report	Grant (yellow card) 22'	Stadium: Oakwell; Attendance: 11,638; Referee: Andrew Madley

27 February 2016 32	Doncaster Rovers	1–1	Millwall	Doncaster
15:00 GMT	Chaplow 37', (yellow card) 54'; Lund (yellow card) 55'; McCullough (yellow card) 90+4'	Report	Morison 6'; Webster (yellow card) 56'; Thompson (yellow card) 80'	Stadium: Keepmoat Stadium; Attendance: 6,810; Referee: Carl Boyeson

1 March 2016 33	Swindon Town	2–0	Doncaster Rovers	Swindon
19:45 GMT	Doughty (yellow card) 14'; Obika 45+2', 66'	Report	Lund (yellow card) 41'; Chaplow (yellow card) 78' (yellow-red card)	Stadium: County Ground; Attendance: 6,556; Referee: Nick Kinseley

5 March 2016 34	Doncaster Rovers	0–1	Shrewsbury Town	Doncaster
15:00 GMT		Report	Knight-Percival (yellow card) 19'; Brown (yellow card) 57'; Whalley 62'; Leutwiler (yellow card) 90+3'	Stadium: Keepmoat Stadium; Attendance: 5,878; Referee: Paul Gibbs

8 March 2016 35	Scunthorpe United	2–0	Doncaster Rovers	Scunthorpe
19:45 GMT	Hopper 7'; Mirfin 58'; Clarke (yellow card) 82'	Report		Stadium: Glanford Park; Attendance: 4,887; Referee: Kevin Wright

12 March 2016 36	Bradford City	2–1	Doncaster Rovers	Bradford
15:00 GMT	Procter 7', 49'; Cullen (yellow card) 38'	Report	Tyson 90'	Stadium: Coral Windows Stadium; Attendance: 17,889; Referee: Neil Swarbrick

19 March 2016 37	Doncaster Rovers	1–2	Peterborough United	Doncaster
15:00 GMT	Coppinger 5'; Williams (yellow card) 36'	Report	Williams 44'; Zakuani (yellow card) 53'; Coulthirst (yellow card) 67'; Oztumer (yellow card) 70'; Ricardo 90+3', (yellow card) 90+3'	Stadium: Keepmoat Stadium; Attendance: 7,884; Referee: Seb Stockbridge

25 March 2016 38	Colchester United	4–1	Doncaster Rovers	Colchester
15:00 GMT	Edwards (yellow card) 33'; Garvan (yellow card) 43'; Porter 62'; Lee 71'; Gilbey 72'; Brindley 87'	Report	McSheffrey 21'	Stadium: Weston Homes Community Stadium; Attendance: 3,771; Referee: Kevin Friend

28 March 2016 39	Doncaster Rovers	0–1	Blackpool	Doncaster
15:00 BST	Butler (yellow card) 14'; Middleton (yellow card) 38'; Williams (yellow card) 70'	Report	Aldred (yellow card) 42'; White (yellow card) 45+2'; Philliskirk (yellow card) 69'; Norris (yellow card) 84'; Cullen 87'	Stadium: Keepmoat Stadium; Attendance: 5,575; Referee: Keith Hill

2 April 2016 40	Rochdale	2–2	Doncaster Rovers	Rochdale
15:00 BST	Camps 43'; Vincenti (yellow card) 83'; Canavan 90+6'	Report	Lund 57'; Butler 68'; Alcock (yellow card) 90+1' (yellow-red card); Chaplow (yellow card) 90+6'	Stadium: Spotland Stadium; Attendance: 2,727; Referee: Darren Bond

9 April 2016 41	Bury	1–0	Doncaster Rovers	Bury
15:00 BST	Clarke 77', (yellow card) 78'	Report	Lund (yellow card) 45'	Stadium: Gigg Lane; Attendance: 3,233; Referee: Michael Bull

16 April 2016 42	Doncaster Rovers	3–1	Wigan Athletic	Doncaster
15:00 BST	Chaplow (yellow card) 28'; McSheffrey (yellow card) 48'; Butler 50', 54' (yellow card) 60'; Williams 88' (pen.)	Report	Grigg 41', (yellow card) 57'; Jacobs (yellow card) 79'; Perkins (red card) 86'	Stadium: Keepmoat Stadium; Attendance: 6,987; Referee: Kevin Johnson

19 April 2016 43	Chesterfield	1–1	Doncaster Rovers	Chesterfield
19:45 BST	Ariyibi 18'; Novak (yellow card) 88'	Report	Rowe 6'; Chaplow (yellow card) 81'; Lund (yellow card) 88'	Stadium: Proact Stadium; Attendance: 6,461; Referee: Jeremy Simpson

23 April 2016 44	Doncaster Rovers	2–0	Coventry City	Doncaster
15:00 BST	Rowe 21'; Williams 32'; Middleton (yellow card) 82'	Report		Stadium: Keepmoat Stadium; Attendance: 6,364; Referee: Darren Handley

30 April 2016 45	Crewe Alexandra	3–1	Doncaster Rovers	Crewe
15:30 BST	Ainley 43'; Haber 57'; Inman 89'	Report	Rowe 28'	Stadium: Alexandra Stadium; Attendance: 4,403; Referee: Lee Swabey

8 May 2016 46	Doncaster Rovers	0–0	Burton Albion	Doncaster
12:30 BST		Report	Choudhury (yellow card) 76'	Stadium: Keepmoat Stadium; Attendance: 9,803; Referee: Andy Woolmer

=== FA Cup ===
On 26 October 2015, the first round draw was made, Doncaster Rovers were drawn at home against Stalybridge Celtic. On 9 November 2015, the second round draw was made, Doncaster Rovers were drawn away against Cambridge United. On 7 December 2015, the third round draw was made, Doncaster Rovers were drawn home against Stoke City.

7 November 2015 First round	Doncaster Rovers	2–0	Stalybridge Celtic	Doncaster
14:00 BST	Williams 3', 68'	Report	Higgins (yellow card) 51'; Wright (yellow card) 70'; Chalmers (yellow card) 90+4'	Stadium: Keepmoat Stadium; Attendance: 3,991; Referee: Martin Coy

6 December 2015 Second round	Cambridge United	1–3	Doncaster Rovers	Cambridge
14:00 BST	Berry 23'; Ledson (yellow card) 25'; Dunk (yellow card) 40'; Roberts (yellow card) 74'; Corr (yellow card) 83'	Report	Coppinger (yellow card) 26'; Grant 46', 57'; Lund 56'	Stadium: Abbey Stadium; Attendance: 3,951; Referee: Mark Brown

9 January 2016 Third Round	Doncaster Rovers	1–2	Stoke City	Doncaster
14:00 BST	Tyson 25', (yellow card) 32'; Grant (yellow card) 84'	Report	Crouch 15'; Wollscheid (yellow card) 31' van Ginkel (yellow card) 39'; Walters 57', (yellow card) 62'	Stadium: Keepmoat Stadium; Attendance: 13,299; Referee: Keith Stroud

=== League Cup ===
On 16 June 2015, the first round draw was made, Doncaster Rovers were drawn at home against Leeds United. In the second round, Doncaster Rovers were drawn at home to Ipswich Town.

11 August 2015 First round	Doncaster Rovers	1–1 (4–2 p)	Leeds United	Doncaster
19:45 BST	Williams 31' (pen.)	Report	Cook 14', (red card) 37'	Stadium: Keepmoat Stadium; Attendance: 8,361; Referee: Keith Hill
	Penalties
	Tyson (penalty scored); Williams (penalty scored); Forrester (penalty scored); Wellens (penalty scored)		Antenucci (penalty scored); Murphy (penalty scored); Byram (penalty missed); Wood (penalty missed)

25 August 2015 Second round	Doncaster Rovers	1–4 (a.e.t.)	Ipswich Town	Doncaster
19:45 BST	Williams 23'; Chaplow (yellow card) 42'; Main (yellow card) 79'	Report	Kenlock (yellow card) 36'; Pitman 58'; McGoldrick 102'; Alabi 105'; Fraser 113'	Stadium: Keepmoat Stadium; Attendance: 3,729; Referee: Scott Duncan

=== Football League Trophy ===
On 8 August 2015, live on Soccer AM the draw for the first round of the Football League Trophy was drawn by Toni Duggan and Alex Scott. On 5 September 2015, the second round draw was shown live on Soccer AM and drawn by Charlie Austin and Ed Skrein. Doncaster will travel to face York City.

1 September 2015 First round	Doncaster Rovers	0–0 (5–3 p)	Burton Albion	Doncaster
19:45 BST	Evina (yellow card) 24'	Report		Stadium: Keepmoat Stadium; Attendance: 2,956; Referee: Ross Joyce
	Penalties
	Williams (penalty scored); Main (penalty scored); Middleton (penalty scored); Chaplow (penalty scored); Stewart (penalty scored)		Akins (penalty scored); Reilly (penalty scored); Naylor (penalty missed); Binnom-Williams (penalty scored)

6 October 2015 Second round	York City	2–0	Doncaster Rovers	York
19:45 BST	Oliver 5', 50'	Report	Forrester (yellow card) 82'	Stadium: Bootham Crescent; Attendance: 1,627

== Season summary ==
As of 8 May 2016

=== Detailed Summary ===
Results on penalties taken as draws

Games played	53 (46 League One, 3 FA Cup, 2 League Cup, 2 League Trophy)
Games won	13 (11 League One, 2 FA Cup, 0 League Cup, 0 League Trophy)
Games drawn	15 (13 League One, 0 FA Cup, 1 League Cup, 1 League Trophy)
Games lost	25 (22 League One, 1 FA Cup, 1 League Cup, 1 League Trophy)
Goals scored	56 (48 League One, 6 FA Cup, 2 League Cup, 0 League Trophy)
Goals conceded	74 (64 League One, 3 FA Cup, 5 League Cup, 2 League Trophy)
Clean sheets	12 (10 League One, 1 FA Cup, 0 League Cup, 1 League Trophy)
Yellow cards	54 (47 League One, 3 FA Cup, 2 League Cup, 2 League Trophy)
Second yellow cards	2 (2 League One, 0 FA Cup, 0 League Cup, 0 League Trophy)
Red cards	1 (1 League One, 0 FA Cup, 0 League Cup, 0 League Trophy)
Worst discipline	Richard Chaplow (9 (yellow card) , 1 (yellow card) (yellow-red card) , 0 (red card) )
Best result	3–0 vs. Chesterfield, Southend United, League One
Worst result	0–4 vs. Peterborough United, League One
Most appearances	53 appearances – Andy Williams
Top scorer(s)	Andy Williams(16)
League One Goal Difference	–16
League One Points	46
FA Cup Goal Difference	3
League Cup Goal Difference	–3
League Trophy Goal Difference	–2
Overall Goal difference	–18

=== Score overview ===
Opposition	Home score	Away score	Double
Barnsley	2–1	0–1	No
Blackpool	0–1	2–0	No
Bradford City	0–1	1–2	No
Burton Albion	0–0	3–3	No
Bury	1–1	0–1	No
Chesterfield	3–0	1–1	No
Colchester United	2–0	1–4	No
Coventry City	2–0	2–2	No
Crewe Alexandra	3–2	1–3	No
Fleetwood Town	2–0	0–0	No
Gillingham	2–2	0–1	No
Millwall	1–1	0–2	No
Oldham Athletic	1–1	2–1	No
Peterborough United	1–2	0–4	No
Port Vale	1–2	0–3	No
Rochdale	0–2	2–2	No
Scunthorpe United	0–1	0–2	No
Sheffield United	0–1	1–3	No
Shrewsbury Town	0–1	2–1	No
Southend United	0–0	3–0	No
Swindon Town	2–2	0–2	No
Walsall	1–2	0–2	No
Wigan Athletic	3–1	0–0	No
