= Jack McKay (footballer, born 1996) =

Scottish footballer (born 1996)

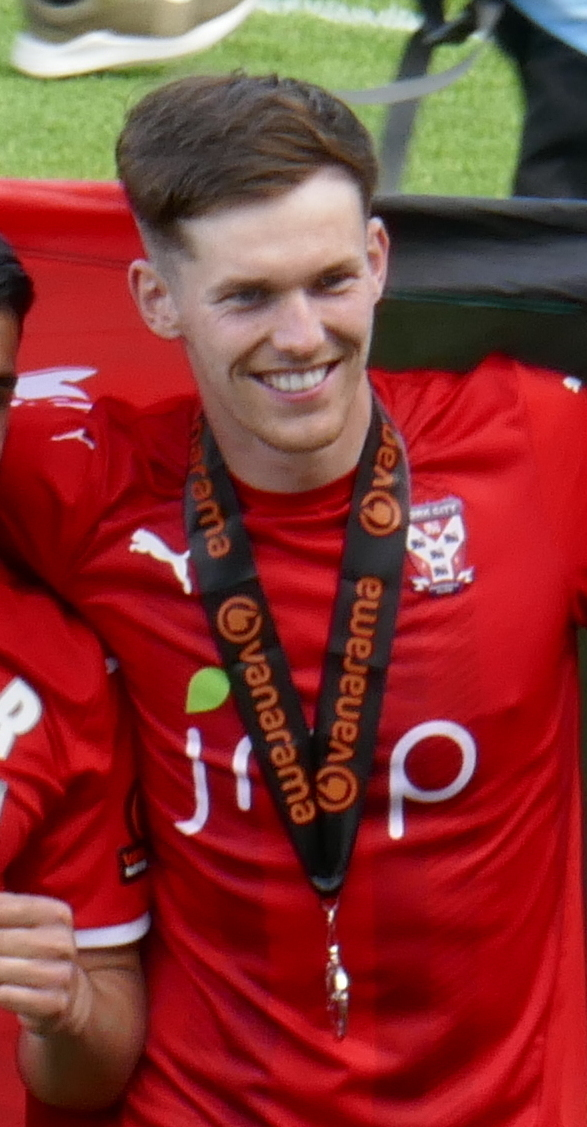
- McKay with York City in 2022

Personal information
- Full name: Jack McKay
- Date of birth: 19 November 1996 (age 30)
- Place of birth: Glasgow, Scotland
- Height: 6 ft 2 in (1.88 m)
- Position: Winger

Youth career
- 2006–2014: Doncaster Rovers

Senior career*
Years	Team	Apps	(Gls)
2014–2016	Doncaster Rovers	4	(0)
2015	→ Ilkeston (loan)	4	(0)
2016–2017	Leeds United	0	(0)
2017	→ Airdrieonians (loan)	15	(1)
2018–2019	Cardiff City	0	(0)
2019	→ Chesterfield (loan)	4	(0)
2019–2021	Chesterfield	15	(2)
2021	→ Blyth Spartans (loan)	0	(0)
2021	→ Airdrieonians (loan)	8	(1)
2021	Curzon Ashton	16	(2)
2021–2022	York City	17	(3)
2022–2023	Buxton	7	(1)
2023	Ashton United	10	(3)
- * Club domestic league appearances and goals as of 00:01, 1 July 2025 (UTC)

Jack McKay (born 19 November 1996) is a Scottish professional footballer who played as a winger.

== Club career ==
=== Doncaster Rovers ===
Glasgow-born McKay began his career at Doncaster Rovers with twin brother Paul when he was nine-years-old. In 2014, he played in the Gothia Cup with under-18s side; scoring in wins over Malmö FF's academy and Beşiktaş Academy as Rovers progressed through to the knock-out round. The Scot scored the equalizer in the next game versus IF Elfsborg Academy before being eliminated on penalties. He caught the attention of First-Team Coach Paul Dickov with an impressive goal-scoring record in the youth team, including scoring a hat-trick against recent champions Norwich City in the FA Youth Cup.

McKay made his professional debut in a 1–0 league defeat to South Yorkshire rivals Sheffield United in November 2014, coming on as a substitute in the 87th minute. He made a further three appearances in the same season before joining Ilkeston on loan in October 2015 to gain first team experience. McKay made his debut for the Robins in a league game versus Nantwich Town and started in a further three games against Barwell, Colwyn Bay and Stamford but failed to find the net in any before returning to his parent club.

=== Leeds United ===
On 11 January 2016, Jack and his brother Paul both joined Championship side Leeds United for undisclosed fees on two-and-a-half-year contracts.

After impressing with the Leeds United Development squad, on 21 April 2016, McKay was named as part of the 'travelling squad' for Leeds first team for their match against Wolverhampton Wanderers however he failed to make a place on the substitutes bench, with Steve Evans saying McKay would have been on the bench had Stuart Dallas failed to recover from injury.

McKay played for Leeds' first team in their 2016–17 pre season friendly against Peterborough United on 23 July 2016.

McKay and his brother Paul ended their contracts by mutual consent on 17 December 2017.

==== Airdrieonians (loan) ====
On 1 January 2017, McKay joined Scottish League One side Airdrieonians on loan until the end of the 2016–17 season. On 4 February 2017, McKay scored his first goal for Airdrieonians when he scored against Peterhead.

=== Cardiff City ===
On 22 January 2018, McKay joined Cardiff City on a 2 1/2-year deal after an extended trial with the club.

=== Non-league ===
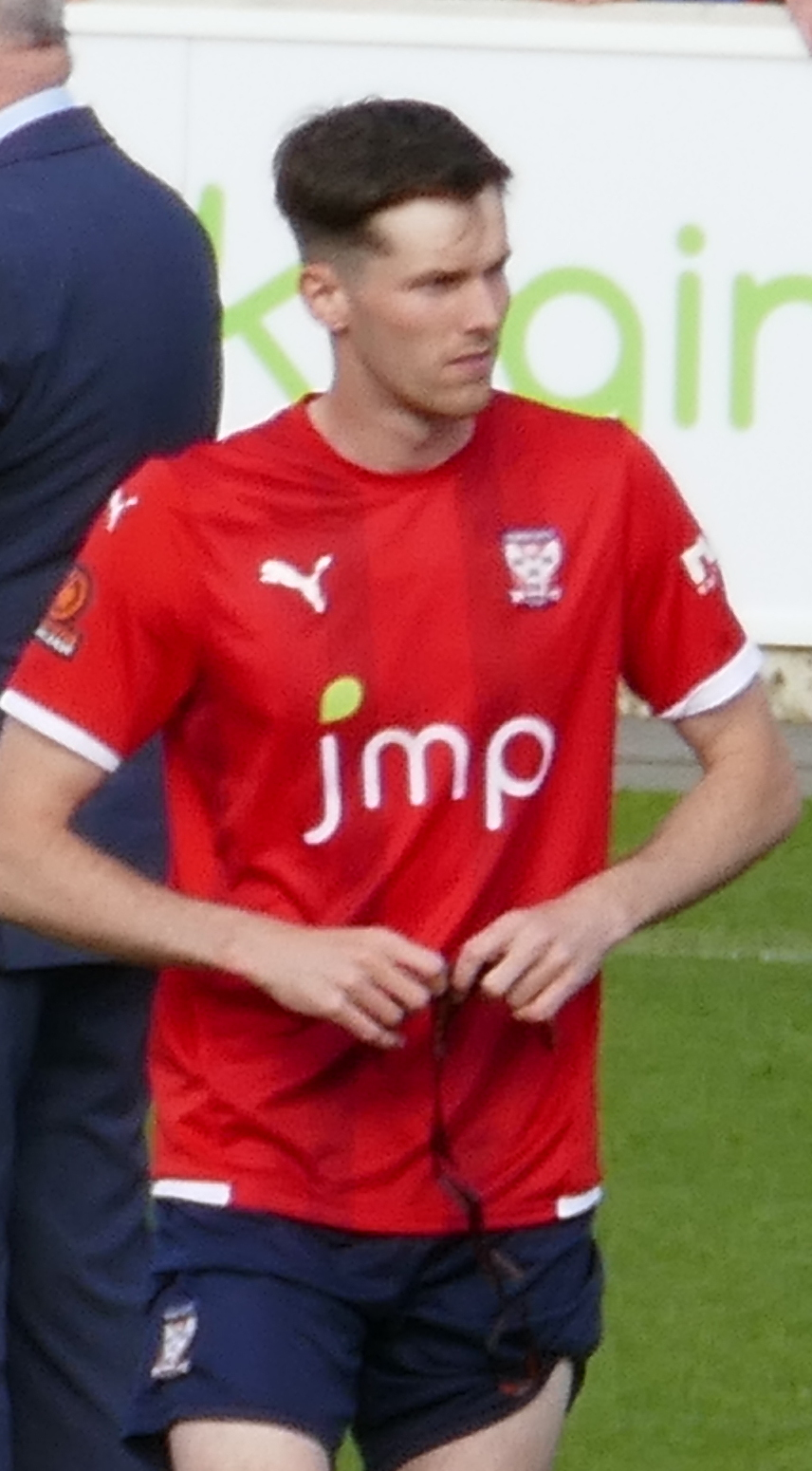
McKay with York City in 2022

On 26 June 2019, following a loan spell, McKay made his move to Chesterfield permanent, signing a two-year contract. On 2 January 2021, McKay joined National League North side Blyth Spartans on a one-month loan deal. On 9 February 2021, McKay returned to former loan club Airdrieonians on loan having failed to make a single appearance for Blyth due to Covid and subsequently departed Airdrieonians in May 2021.

After winning promotion via the National League North play-offs at the end of the 2021–22 season with York City, McKay returned to the National League North in June 2022 to join newly promoted Buxton. In January 2023, Mckay joined Northern Premier League club Ashton United.

== Personal life ==
McKay's father Willie McKay and his older brother Mark are both football agents. His twin brother, Paul McKay is also a professional footballer. He studied at Hill House School.

== Career statistics ==
As of match played 13 October 2020

Appearances and goals by club, season and competition
Club	Season	League			National Cup		League Cup		Other		Total	
Club	Season	Division	Apps	Goals	Apps	Goals	Apps	Goals	Apps	Goals	Apps	Goals
Doncaster Rovers	2014–15	EFL League One	4	0	0	0	0	0	0	0	4	0
Doncaster Rovers	2015–16	EFL League One	0	0	0	0	0	0	0	0	0	0
Doncaster Rovers	Total		4	0	0	0	0	0	0	0	4	0
Ilkeston (loan)	2015–16	NPL Premier Division	4	0	0	0	0	0	0	0	4	0
Leeds United	2015–16	EFL Championship	0	0	0	0	0	0	0	0	0	0
Leeds United	2016–17	EFL Championship	0	0	0	0	0	0	0	0	0	0
Leeds United	Total		0	0	0	0	0	0	0	0	0	0
Airdrieonians (loan)	2016–17	Scottish League One	15	1	0	0	0	0	1	0	16	1
Cardiff City	2017–18	EFL Championship	0	0	0	0	0	0	0	0	0	0
Cardiff City	2018–19	Premier League	0	0	0	0	0	0	0	0	0	0
Chesterfield (loan)	2018–19	National League	4	0	0	0	—		0	0	4	0
Chesterfield	2019–20	National League	14	2	0	0	—		0	0	14	2
Chesterfield	2020–21	National League	1	0	0	0	—		0	0	1	0
Blyth Spartans (loan)	2020–21	National League North	0	0	0	0	—		0	0	0	0
Airdrieonians (loan)	2020–21	Scottish League One	0	0	0	0	0	0	0	0	0	0
Career total			42	3	0	0	0	0	1	0	43	3

== Honours ==
Individual

- Doncaster Rovers Academy Player of the Year: 2013
