= Thomas Clarke (footballer) =

English footballer

Tom Clarke
Personal information
- Full name: Thomas Clarke
- Date of birth: 2 January 1989 (age 37)
- Place of birth: Worthing, Sussex, England
- Position: Forward

Youth career
- Okeford United
- 2005–2006: Yeovil Town

Senior career*
| Years | Team | Apps | (Gls) |
| 2006–2007 | Yeovil Town | 1 | (0) |
| 2007 | → Taunton Town (loan) | 5 | (3) |
| 2007 | → Bridgwater Town (loan) | | |
| 2008 | Dorchester Town | 5 | (0) |
| 2008 | Eastleigh | 3 | (0) |
| 2008–2009 | Bognor Regis Town | 11 | (7) |
| 2009 | Dorchester Town | 7 | (4) |
| 2009–2010 | Wimborne Town | | |
| 2011 | North Ferriby United | | |
- Pickering Town
- * Club domestic league appearances and goals as of 21:40, 28 February 2016 (UTC)

Thomas Clarke (born 2 January 1989) is an English former professional footballer who played as a forward.

== Career ==
As a teenager Clarke grew up playing for his local youth team Okeford United, and it was while representing his county Dorset that he was spotted by Yeovil Town and offered a youth contract. In June 2006, Clarke was awarded his first professional contract with Yeovil along with fellow youth team players Craig Alcock and Jake Smeeton. In February 2007, Clarke along with Alcock joined Southern League Division One South & West side Taunton Town on a month-loan deal making five appearances scoring three times before his return to Yeovil. On 5 May 2007, Clarke was one of three youth team players, along with Alcock and Gavin McCallum, to make their Yeovil debut away at Gillingham in the final regular league game of the 2006–07 with the club having already assured themselves of their place in the end of season play-offs. Clarke started the match and played the opening 57 minutes of the match before being replaced by striker Daniel Webb. At the end of the season, Clarke was awarded a new six-month contract extension. Having started the new season as a regular in the Yeovil reserve team, in September 2007, Clarke joined another Southern League Division One South & West side Bridgwater Town on loan. Clarke was recalled from his loan spell after two months when Yeovil suffered a series of injuries, Clarke returned to Yeovil having scored seven goals in eleven matches in all competitions for Bridgwater. At the end of December 2007, his contract with Yeovil expired having made only one appearance for Yeovil.

After his release from Yeovil, Clarke played in the Conference South having two spells with Dorchester Town, Eastleigh and Bognor Regis Town. Clarke also played for Wimborne Town and while studying at York University, he played semi-professionally for North Ferriby United and Pickering Town.

== Personal life ==
Born in Worthing, Sussex. Clarke grew up in the village of Okeford Fitzpaine, Dorset. After dropping out of professional football, Clarke studied for a degree at the University of York.
