= Simón Colina =

Spanish footballer

Personal information
- Full name: Simón Colina Domínguez
- Date of birth: 7 February 1995 (age 31)
- Place of birth: Barcelona, Spain
- Height: 1.72 m (5 ft 7 1/2 in)
- Position: Midfielder

Team information
- Current team: Vard Haugesund
- Number: 11

Youth career
- Girona
- 2007–2013: Barcelona

Senior career*
Years	Team	Apps	(Gls)
2013–2015	Partick Thistle	0	(0)
2015–2016	Nea Salamis	11	(0)
2016–2018	Radomiak Radom	36	(0)
2019–2020	Sandnes Ulf	25	(1)
2020–2021	Kvik Halden	7	(1)
2021	Peralada	6	(0)
2021	UMF Vikingur Olafsvik	12	(1)
2022	UE Santa Coloma	8	(0)
2022–	Vard Haugesund	27	(0)
- * Club domestic league appearances and goals as of 7 February 2024

Simón Colina Domínguez (born 7 February 1995) is a Spanish professional footballer who plays for Norwegian club Vard Haugesund as a midfielder.

== Club career ==
Born in Barcelona, Catalonia, Colina joined FC Barcelona's youth setup in 2007, aged 12, after starting it out at Girona FC. On 31 July 2013, after finishing his graduation, he signed a two-year deal with Scottish Premiership side Partick Thistle F.C. on a free transfer.

On 12 August 2015, after making no appearances for The Jags, Colina joined Cypriot First Division team Nea Salamis Famagusta FC. He made his professional debut on 22 August, coming on as a second-half substitute for Aldo Adorno in a 3–5 away loss against AC Omonia. On 15 December 2016 he moved to the Polish club Radomiak Radom. He left the club at the end of 2018.
