= Jerahl Hughes =

English footballer

Personal information
- Date of birth: 10 August 1989 (age 37)
- Place of birth: Brighton, England
- Position: Midfielder

Youth career
- Crystal Palace

Senior career*
Years	Team	Apps	(Gls)
2005–2007	Crystal Palace	0	(0)
2007–2008	Yeovil Town	1	(0)
2008	→ Worthing (loan)		
2008–2009	Dover Athletic	52	(5)
2010–2014	Whitehawk		
2014–2015	WaiBOP United	5	(0)
2015–2017	Tauranga City United		
2017–2018	Hamilton Wanderers	13	(0)
- * Club domestic league appearances and goals as of 22:53, 11 October 2018 (UTC)

Jerahl Hughes (born 10 August 1989) is an English footballer who plays as a winger.

The winger, born in Brighton, was a product of Crystal Palace's youth academy, and played a major role in their run in the FA Youth Cup in 2007. In March 2007 he was taken on trial by Yeovil Town, and the Somerset club signed him permanently for the 2007–08 season. At Yeovil, however, he was restricted to just one appearance in the Football League, and was eventually loaned out to Worthing before being released at the end of the season. He was subsequently signed by Andy Hessenthaler, manager of Dover Athletic, after a successful trial. However, after travelling issues took their toll, Hughes left Dover by mutual consent in December 2009.
