= Gabriel Piccolo =

Mexican footballer (born 1989)

Personal information
- Full name: Gabriel Rojo de la Vega Piccolo
- Date of birth: 15 October 1989 (age 37)
- Place of birth: Mexico City, Mexico
- Height: 1.86 m (6 ft 1 in)
- Position: Defender

Youth career
- 1995–2009: América
- 2006–2009: → Atlante (loan)

Senior career*
Years	Team	Apps	(Gls)
2010–2012	América	0	(0)
2010	→ Atlante UTN (loan)	2	(0)
2011–2012	→ San Luis (loan)	3	(0)
2012	Dénia	13	(1)
2012–2013	Rayo Vallecano B	28	(2)
2013–2014	Partick Thistle	17	(0)
Total		63	(3)
- * Club domestic league appearances and goals

Gabriel Rojo de la Vega Piccolo (born 15 October 1989), is a Mexican retired footballer who played as a defender. He played in the Primera División de México for San Luis and in the Scottish Premiership for Partick Thistle.

== Club career ==
Born in Mexico City, Piccolo began his career with his hometown club América. He then moved to Atlante, joining their second-division team Atlante UTN (now Toros Neza).

Piccolo played two matches before being loaned to San Luis, making his professional debut on 16 March 2011, in a Copa Libertadores 1–1 away draw against Once Caldas. He made his league debut on 2 April, in a 2–3 loss against Querétaro.

On 21 January 2012, Piccolo moved to Spain, signing a contract with CD Dénia, in Segunda División B. On 1 August, he joined La Liga side Rayo Vallecano, being assigned to the reserves also in the third division.

=== Partick Thistle ===
On 27 July 2013, Piccolo signed a two-year deal with Scottish Premiership side Partick Thistle after impressing on a trial. He made his competitive debut for the club on 6 August 2013, during a 2–1 victory over Ayr United in the Scottish League Cup.

Despite appearing regularly for the side during the campaign, Piccolo had his contract terminated by mutual consent on 21 August 2014.
