= 2008–09 Yeovil Town F.C. season =

Yeovil Town
2008–09 season
- Chairman: John Fry
- Manager: Russell Slade (until 16 February); Steve Thompson (Caretaker); Terry Skiverton (from 18 February)
- Stadium: Huish Park
- League One: 17th
- FA Cup: First Round Replay
- League Cup: Second Round
- FL Trophy: First Round
- Top goalscorer: League: Gavin Tomlin (7); All: Gavin Tomlin (9)
- Highest home attendance: 6,580 (23 August vs. Leeds United, League One)
- Lowest home attendance: 3,275 (13 January vs. Scunthorpe United, League One)
- Average home league attendance: 4,423
Home colours	Away colours

The 2008–09 Yeovil Town F.C. season was Yeovil Town's 6th season in the Football League and their fourth consecutive season in League One, finishing in 17th position with 51 points.

== Transfers ==
=== In ===
Date	Name	From	Fee	Ref
12 June 2008	Keiran Murtagh	Fisher Athletic	Undisclosed	
1 July 2008	Aidan Downes	Everton	Free (released)	
1 July 2008	Danny Schofield	Huddersfield Town	Free (released)	
12 July 2008	Darren Way	Swansea City	Undisclosed	
21 July 2008	Gavin Tomlin	Fisher Athletic	Free (released)	
6 August 2008	Josh Wagenaar	Lyngby BK	Free (released)	
11 August 2008	Aaron Brown	Reading	Free (released)	
15 August 2008	Andre McCollin	Fisher Athletic	Undisclosed	
3 September 2008	Andy Welsh	Blackpool	Free (released)	
9 January 2009	Gary Roberts	Crewe Alexandra	Undisclosed	
15 January 2009	Luke Rodgers	Port Vale	Free (released)	

=== Out ===
Date	Name	To	Fee	Ref
1 August 2008	Scott Guyett	Bournemouth	Contract terminated by mutual consent	
1 August 2008	Andy Kirk	Dunfermline Athletic	Free	
1 September 2008	Lloyd Owusu	Cheltenham Town	Free	
30 January 2009	Marc Bircham	n/a	Retired	
2 May 2009	Luke Rodgers	Notts County	Contract terminated by mutual consent	
12 May 2009	Aaron Brown	Redditch United	Released	
30 June 2009	Rob Fitzgerald	Wealdstone	Released	
30 June 2009	Jordan Street	Redditch United	Released	
30 June 2009	Josh Wagenaar	Falkirk	Rejected new contract	
30 June 2009	Paul Warne	Rotherham United	Rejected new contract	
30 June 2009	Lee Peltier	Huddersfield Town	Undisclosed	

=== Loan in ===
Date	Name	From	End date	Ref
7 August 2008	Asmir Begović	Portsmouth	7 November 2008	
22 August 2008	Gary Roberts	Crewe Alexandra	1 January 2009	
26 August 2008	James Dayton	Crystal Palace	26 September 2008	
16 October 2008	Gareth Owen	Stockport County	16 November 2008	
16 October 2008	Scott Rendell	Peterborough United	12 November 2008	
5 November 2008	Gifton Noel-Williams	Millwall	26 December 2008	
24 November 2008	Luke Rodgers	Port Vale	5 January 2009	
21 January 2009	Lee Cox	Leicester City	21 February 2009	
27 January 2009	Shaun MacDonald	Swansea City	26 February 2009	
27 January 2009	Aleksandar Prijović	Derby County	26 February 2009	
30 January 2009	Jon Worthington	Huddersfield Town	26 March 2009	
3 March 2009	Danny Hutchins	Tottenham Hotspur	2 May 2009	
16 March 2009	Chris Weale	Bristol City	2 May 2009	
19 March 2009	Jonathan Obika	Tottenham Hotspur	2 May 2009	
19 March 2009	Andros Townsend	Tottenham Hotspur	2 May 2009	
25 March 2009	Danny Maguire	Queens Park Rangers	2 May 2009	
25 March 2009	David Noble	Bristol City	2 May 2009	

=== Loan out ===
Date	Name	To	End date	Ref
15 February 2009	Rob Fitzgerald	Enfield Town	15 March 2009	

== Match results ==
=== League One ===
Date	League position	Opponents	Venue	Result	Score F–A	Scorers	Attendance	Ref
9 August 2008	11th	Walsall	H	D	1–1	Tomlin	4,518	
16 August 2008	4th	Hereford United	A	W	2–1	Schofield, Warne	3,476	
23 August 2008	6th	Leeds United	H	D	1–1	Owusu	6,580	
30 August 2008	15th	Carlisle United	A	L	1–4	Tomlin	6,286	
6 September 2008	19th	Milton Keynes Dons	A	L	0–3		7,959	
13 September 2008	18th	Brighton & Hove Albion	H	D	1–1	Way	4,451	
20 September 2008	18th	Bristol Rovers	H	D	2–2	Skiverton, Roberts	5,748	
27 September 2008	22nd	Scunthorpe United	A	L	0–2		4,829	
4 October 2008	23rd	Southend United	H	L	1–2	Schofield	4,008	
18 October 2008	23rd	Northampton Town	A	L	0–3		5,217	
21 October 2008	21st	Crewe Alexandra	H	W	3–2	Schofield (2), Way	3,536	
25 October 2008	20th	Leyton Orient	H	D	0–0		4,320	
28 October 2008	20th	Huddersfield Town	A	D	0–0		10,719	
1 November 2008	19th	Oldham Athletic	A	W	2–0	Brown, Warne	5,318	
11 November 2008	19th	Leicester City	A	L	0–1		16,528	
15 November 2008	21st	Peterborough United	H	L	0–1		4,001	
22 November 2008	19th	Tranmere Rovers	H	W	1–0	Skiverton	3,445	
25 November 2008	21st	Colchester United	A	L	0–1		3,214	
6 December 2008	21st	Hartlepool United	A	D	0–0		3,393	
13 December 2008	21st	Stockport County	H	L	2–4	Smith, Warne	3,687	
20 December 2008	18th	Swindon Town	A	W	3–2	Alcock, Peltier, Ifil (og)	7,072	
26 December 2008	19th	Cheltenham Town	H	D	1–1	Rodgers	4,989	
28 December 2008	18th	Millwall	A	D	1–1	Rodgers	9,042	
13 January 2009	19th	Scunthorpe United	H	L	1–2	McCollin	3,275	
19 January 2009	19th	Leicester City	H	L	0–2		4,569	
24 January 2009	18th	Southend United	A	W	1–0	Brown	6,409	
27 January 2009	18th	Huddersfield Town	H	W	1–0	MacDonald	3,703	
31 January 2009	17th	Leyton Orient	A	W	1–0	Tomlin	4,597	
14 February 2009	16th	Peterborough United	A	W	3–1	Warne, Brown, MacDonald	6,129	
17 February 2009	17th	Bristol Rovers	A	L	0–3		8,049	
21 February 2009	15th	Oldham Athletic	H	D	2–2	Tomlin (2)	4,150	
24 February 2009	16th	Crewe Alexandra	A	L	0–2		3,432	
28 February 2009	18th	Walsall	A	L	0–2		3,916	
7 March 2009	18th	Carlisle United	H	D	1–1	Roberts	3,892	
10 March 2009	20th	Leeds United	A	L	0–4		18,847	
14 March 2009	20th	Brighton & Hove Albion	A	L	0–5		6,291	
21 March 2009	21st	Milton Keynes Dons	H	D	0–0		4,028	
28 March 2009	21st	Swindon Town	H	W	1–0	Obika	5,476	
31 March 2009	16th	Northampton Town	H	W	1–0	Obika	3,884	
4 April 2009	17th	Stockport County	A	D	0–0		5,664	
10 April 2009	16th	Millwall	H	W	2–0	Obika, Tomlin	6,230	
13 April 2009	16th	Cheltenham Town	A	L	0–1		3,775	
18 April 2009	18th	Hartlepool United	H	L	2–3	Tomlin, Townsend	4,232	
21 April 2009	17th	Hereford United	H	D	2–2	Rodgers, Weale	3,780	
25 April 2009	17th	Tranmere Rovers	A	D	1–1	Obika	8,306	
2 May 2009	17th	Colchester United	H	L	0–2		5,237	

==== League table ====
Pos	Team	Pld	W	D	L	GF	GA	GD	Pts
15	Swindon Town	46	12	17	17	68	71	−3	53
16	Brighton & Hove Albion	46	13	13	20	55	70	−15	52
17	Yeovil Town	46	12	15	19	41	66	−25	51
18	Stockport County	46	16	12	18	59	57	+2	50 (Note: Stockport County deducted 10 points for entering administration.)
19	Hartlepool United	46	13	11	22	66	79	−13	50

Updated to match(es) played on 2 May 2009. Source: The Football League
Rules for classification: 1) points; 2) goal difference; 3) number of goals scored.

=== FA Cup ===
Round	Date	Opponents	Venue	Result	Score F–A	Scorers	Attendance	Ref
First round	8 November 2008	Stockport County	H	D	1–1	Skiverton	3,582	
First round replay	18 November 2008	Stockport County	A	L	0–5		3,260	

=== League Cup ===
Round	Date	Opponents	Venue	Result	Score F–A	Scorers	Attendance	Ref
First round	12 August 2008	Charlton Athletic	A	W	1–0	Warne	6,239	
Second round	26 August 2008	Middlesbrough	A	L	1–5	Tomlin	15,651	

=== Football League Trophy ===
Round	Date	Opponents	Venue	Result	Score F–A	Scorers	Attendance	Ref
First round	2 September 2008	Brentford	A	D	2–2 (Note: Brentford won 4–2 in a penalty shootout following a 2–2 draw.)	Bircham, Tomlin (pen)	1,339	

== Squad statistics ==
Numbers in parentheses denote appearances as substitute.
Players with squad numbers struck through and marked † left the club during the playing season.
Players with names in italics and marked * were on loan from another club for the whole of their season with Yeovil.
Players listed with no appearances have been in the matchday squad but only as unused substitutes.
Key to positions: GK – Goalkeeper; DF – Defender; MF – Midfielder; FW – Forward

No.	Pos.	Nat.	Name	Apps	Goals	Apps	Goals	Apps	Goals	Apps	Goals	Apps	Goals	Yellow card	Red card
No.	Pos.	Nat.	Name	League		FA Cup		League Cup		FL Trophy		Total		Discipline	
~~1~~ †	GK	CAN	Asmir Begović *	14	0	0	0	0	0	0	0	14	0	2	0
1	GK	ENG	Chris Weale *	10	1	0	0	0	0	0	0	10	1	1	0
3	DF	WAL	Nathan Jones	15 (8)	0	2	0	1	0	1	0	19 (8)	0	3	0
4	DF	ENG	Terry Skiverton	25	2	2	1	2	0	0	0	29	3	1	1
~~5~~ †	DF	WAL	Gareth Owen *	7	0	0	0	0	0	0	0	7	0	2	0
6	DF	ENG	Terrell Forbes	38	0	1 (1)	0	2	0	1	0	43	0	9	1
~~7~~ †	MF	CAN	Marc Bircham	3	0	0	0	0 (1)	0	1	1	4 (1)	1	1	0
~~7~~ †	MF	ENG	Jon Worthington *	9	0	0	0	0	0	0	0	9	0	4	0
8	MF	ENG	Darren Way	15	2	1	0	2	0	0 (1)	0	18 (1)	2	1	0
~~9~~ †	FW	GHA	Lloyd Owusu	0 (4)	1	0	0	0 (1)	0	0	0	0 (5)	1	0	0
9	MF	ENG	Andy Welsh	23 (13)	0	0 (1)	0	0	0	0	0	23 (14)	0	2	0
10	FW	ENG	Gavin Tomlin	29 (13)	7	0 (2)	0	2	1	1	1	32 (15)	9	4	0
11	MF	ENG	Danny Schofield	34 (4)	4	2	0	1	0	0	0	37 (4)	4	6	1
12	DF	ENG	Craig Alcock	25 (5)	1	2	0	0 (2)	0	1	0	28 (7)	1	4	0
13	GK	CAN	Josh Wagenaar	22 (1)	0	2	0	2	0	1	0	27 (1)	0	1	1
14	FW	ENG	Paul Warne	38 (6)	4	1 (1)	0	2	1	1	0	42 (7)	5	6	0
~~15~~ †	FW	ENG	Scott Rendell *	5	0	0 (1)	0	0	0	0	0	5 (1)	0	1	0
15	FW	ENG	Luke Rodgers	10 (12)	3	0	0	0	0	0	0	10 (12)	3	3	0
16	MF	ENG	Gary Roberts	27 (3)	2	2	0	1	0	1	0	31 (3)	2	10	1
17	FW	IRL	Aidan Downes	15 (9)	0	1	0	1	0	0	0	17 (9)	0	4	1
18	MF	ENG	Keiran Murtagh	16 (10)	0	1	0	2	0	1	0	20 (10)	0	2	0
19	FW	ENG	Andre McCollin	0 (11)	1	0	0	0 (1)	0	0 (1)	0	0 (13)	1	1	0
~~20~~ †	MF	ENG	Steve Thompson	0	0	0	0	0	0	0	0	0	0	0	0
21	DF	ENG	Rob Fitzgerald	0	0	0	0	0	0	0	0	0	0	0	0
22	DF	ENG	Jordan Street	0	0	0	0	0	0	0	0	0	0	0	0
23	DF	ENG	Aaron Brown	16 (7)	3	1	0	0	0	1	0	18 (7)	3	2	1
~~24~~ †	FW	SRB	Aleksandar Prijović *	4	0	0	0	0	0	0	0	4	0	0	0
24	DF	ENG	Danny Hutchins *	8 (1)	0	0	0	0	0	0	0	8 (1)	0	1	0
~~25~~ †	FW	ENG	Gifton Noel-Williams *	6	0	2	0	0	0	0	0	8	0	0	0
~~25~~ †	MF	ENG	Lee Cox *	0	0	0	0	0	0	0	0	0	0	0	0
25	MF	ENG	Andros Townsend *	10	1	0	0	0	0	0	0	10	1	1	0
~~26~~ †	MF	WAL	Shaun MacDonald *	4	2	0	0	0	0	0	0	4	2	0	0
26	FW	ENG	Jonathan Obika *	10	4	0	0	0	0	0	0	10	4	0	0
27	DF	ENG	Lee Peltier	34 (1)	1	2	0	2	0	0	0	38 (1)	1	13	0
28	DF	ENG	Nathan Smith	31	1	0	0	1	0	0	0	32	1	3	0
~~29~~ †	MF	ENG	James Dayton *	0 (2)	0	0	0	1	0	1	0	2 (2)	0	0	0
29	MF	ENG	Danny Maguire *	1	0	0	0	0	0	0	0	1	0	0	0
30	MF	ENG	David Noble *	2	0	0	0	0	0	0	0	2	0	1	0
31	GK	ENG	Lloyd Irish	0	0	0	0	0	0	0	0	0	0	0	0

== See also ==
- 2008–09 in English football
- List of Yeovil Town F.C. seasons
