= 2009–10 Yeovil Town F.C. season =

Yeovil Town
2009–2010 season
- Chairman: John Fry
- Manager: Terry Skiverton
- Stadium: Huish Park
- League One: 15th
- FA Cup: First Round
- League Cup: First Round
- FL Trophy: First Round
- Top goalscorer: League: Dean Bowditch (10); All: Dean Bowditch (10)
- Highest home attendance: 7,484 (17 April vs. Southampton, League One)
- Lowest home attendance: 3,469 (16 February vs. Colchester United, League One)
- Average home league attendance: 4,664
| Home colours | Away colours |

The 2009–10 Yeovil Town F.C. season was Yeovil Town's 7th season in the Football League and their fifth consecutive season in League One, finishing in 15th position with 53 points.

== First team squad ==
- Statistics include only League, FA Cup and League Cup appearances and goals, as of the end of the season.
- Age given is at the start of Yeovil's first match of the season (8 August 2009).

| No. | Name | Nat. | Place of birth | Date of birth | Position | Club apps. | Club goals | Int. caps | Int. goals | Previous club | Date joined | Notes |
|---|---|---|---|---|---|---|---|---|---|---|---|---|
| 1 | Alex McCarthy | (England) | Guildford | 3 December 1989 (aged 19) | GK | 45 | 0 | – | – | Reading | 24 July 2009 | on loan from Reading |
| 2 | Craig Alcock | (England) | Truro | 8 December 1987 (aged 21) | DF | 93 | 2 | – | – | Trainee | 16 June 2006 | Captain |
| 3 | Nathan Jones | (Wales) | Rhondda | 28 May 1973 (aged 36) | DF | 177 | 2 | – | – | Brighton & Hove Albion | 28 June 2005 | |
| 4 | Stefan Stam | (Netherlands) | Alkmaar | 14 September 1979 (aged 29) | DF | 20 | 1 | – | – | Oldham Athletic | 1 July 2009 | Vice-captain |
| 5 | Steven Caulker | (England) | Feltham | 29 December 1991 (aged 17) | DF | 46 | 0 | – | – | Tottenham Hotspur | 13 July 2009 | on loan from Tottenham Hotspur |
| 6 | Terrell Forbes | (England) | Southwark | 17 August 1981 (aged 27) | DF | 182 | 1 | – | – | Oldham Athletic | 22 June 2006 | |
| 7 | Arron Davies | (Wales) | Cardiff | 22 June 1984 (aged 25) | MF | 125 | 27 | 1 | 0 | Brighton & Hove Albion | 11 February 2010 | on loan from Brighton & Hove Albion |
| 8 | Keiran Murtagh | (England) | Wapping | 29 October 1988 (aged 20) | MF | 59 | 3 | – | – | Fisher Athletic | 12 June 2008 | |
| 9 | Sam Williams | (England) | Greenwich | 9 June 1987 (aged 22) | FW | 37 | 4 | – | – | Aston Villa | 21 July 2009 | |
| 10 | Gavin Tomlin | (England) | Lewisham | 13 January 1983 (aged 26) | FW | 84 | 16 | – | – | Fisher Athletic | 21 July 2008 | |
| 11 | Andy Welsh | (England) | Manchester | 24 November 1983 (aged 25) | MF | 83 | 2 | – | – | Blackpool | 3 September 2008 | |
| 14 | Dean Bowditch | (England) | Bishop's Stortford | 15 June 1986 (aged 23) | FW | 30 | 10 | – | – | Ipswich Town | 30 July 2009 | |
| 15 | Richard Martin | (England) | Chelmsford | 1 September 1987 (aged 21) | GK | 5 | 0 | – | – | Manchester City | 4 August 2009 | |
| 16 | Scott Murray | (Scotland) | Aberdeen | 26 May 1974 (aged 35) | MF | 22 | 2 | – | – | Bristol City | 1 July 2009 | |
| 17 | Aidan Downes | (Republic of Ireland) | Dublin | 24 July 1988 (aged 21) | MF, FW | 36 | 1 | – | – | Everton | 1 July 2009 | |
| 19 | Luke Ayling | (England) | Lambeth | 25 August 1991 (aged 17) | DF, MF | 4 | 0 | – | – | Arsenal | 17 March 2010 | on loan from Arsenal |
| 20 | Gavin Williams | (Wales) | Merthyr Tydfil | 20 July 1980 (aged 29) | MF | 117 | 27 | 2 | 0 | Bristol City | 11 March 2010 | on loan from Bristol City |
| 21 | Jean-Paul Kalala | (Democratic Republic of the Congo) | Lubumbashi | 16 February 1982 (aged 27) | MF | 76 | 1 | 7 | 0 | Oldham Athletic | 20 August 2009 | |
| 23 | Danny Hutchins | (England) | Northolt | 23 September 1989 (aged 19) | DF, MF | 18 | 0 | – | – | Tottenham Hotspur | 3 March 2009 | |
| 24 | Terry Skiverton | (England) | Mile End | 26 June 1975 (aged 34) | DF | 382 | 44 | – | – | Welling United | 14 June 1999 | Player-manager |
| 25 | Shaun MacDonald | (Wales) | Swansea | 17 June 1988 (aged 21) | MF | 35 | 5 | – | – | Swansea City | 1 January 2010 | on loan from Swansea City |
| 28 | Nathan Smith | (England) | Enfield | 11 January 1987 (aged 22) | DF | 77 | 1 | – | – | Potters Bar Town | 23 March 2008 | |
| 32 | Andre McCollin | (England) | Lambeth | 26 March 1985 (aged 24) | FW | 15 | 1 | – | – | Fisher Athletic | 15 August 2008 | |
| 33 | Ben Roberts | (England) | Bishop Auckland | 22 June 1975 (aged 34) | GK | 0 | 0 | – | – | Derry City | 25 June 2009 | |
Players who appeared in Yeovil Town's squad but finished the season not playing for Yeovil:
| | Gary Roberts | (England) | Chester | 2 February 1987 (aged 22) | MF | 34 | 2 | – | – | Crewe Alexandra | 22 August 2008 | |
| | Danny Schofield | (England) | Doncaster | 10 April 1980 (aged 29) | MF | 47 | 5 | – | – | Huddersfield Town | 1 July 2008 | |
| | Craig Davies | (Wales) | (England) Burton upon Trent | 10 April 1980 (aged 29) | FW | 4 | 0 | 5 | 0 | Brighton & Hove Albion | 25 September 2009 | on loan from Brighton & Hove Albion |
| | George O'Callaghan | (Republic of Ireland) | Cork | 5 September 1979 (aged 29) | MF | 15 | 0 | – | – | Dundalk | 24 July 2009 | |
| | Andy Lindegaard | (England) | Taunton | 10 September 1980 (aged 28) | DF, MF | 190 | 12 | – | – | Cheltenham Town | 6 August 2009 | |
| | Louis Lavers | (England) | Brent | 29 September 1990 (aged 18) | DF | 0 | 0 | – | – | Nike Football Academy | 16 October 2009 | |
| | Sam Lechmere | (England) | Barking and Dagenham | 22 July 1991 (aged 18) | MF | 0 | 0 | – | – | Nike Football Academy | 28 December 2009 | |
| | Darren Way | (England) | Plymouth | 21 November 1979 (aged 29) | MF | 274 | 36 | – | – | Swansea City | 8 July 2008 | |
| | Jonathan Obika | (England) | Enfield | 12 September 1990 (aged 18) | FW | 35 | 11 | – | – | Tottenham Hotspur | 11 August 2009 | on loan from Tottenham Hotspur |
| | Owain Tudur Jones | (Wales) | Bangor | 15 October 1984 (aged 24) | MF | 6 | 1 | 4 | 0 | Norwich City | 27 January 2010 | on loan from Norwich City |
| | Ryan Mason | (England) | Enfield | 29 December 1991 (aged 17) | MF, FW | 29 | 6 | – | – | Tottenham Hotspur | 13 July 2009 | on loan from Tottenham Hotspur |
| | Scott Davies | (Republic of Ireland) | (England) Aylesbury | 10 March 1988 (aged 21) | MF | 4 | 0 | – | – | Reading | 15 March 2010 | on loan from Reading |

== Transfers ==
=== In ===
| Date | Name | From | Fee | Ref |
|---|---|---|---|---|
| 1 July 2009 | Danny Hutchins | Tottenham Hotspur | Free (released) | |
| 1 July 2009 | Scott Murray | Bristol City | Free (released) | |
| 1 July 2009 | Ben Roberts | Unattached | Free (released) | |
| 1 July 2009 | Stefan Stam | Oldham Athletic | Free (released) | |
| 21 July 2009 | Sam Williams | Aston Villa | Free (released) | |
| 24 July 2009 | George O'Callaghan | Dundalk | Free (released) | |
| 30 July 2009 | Dean Bowditch | Ipswich Town | Free (released) | |
| 4 August 2009 | Richard Martin | Manchester City | Free (released) | |
| 6 August 2009 | Andy Lindegaard | Cheltenham Town | Free (released) | |
| 4 September 2009 | Jean-Paul Kalala | Oldham Athletic | Free (released) | |
| 16 October 2009 | Louis Lavers | Nike Football Academy | Free | |
| 28 December 2009 | Sam Lechmere | Nike Football Academy | Free | |

=== Out ===
| Date | Name | To | Fee | Ref |
|---|---|---|---|---|
| 5 August 2009 | Gary Roberts | Rotherham United | Contract terminated | |
| 1 September 2009 | Danny Schofield | Millwall | Undisclosed fee | |
| 31 December 2009 | Louis Lavers | Wealdstone | Released | |
| 31 December 2009 | George O'Callaghan | Waterford United | Released | |
| 31 December 2009 | Andy Lindegaard | Truro City | Rejected new contract | |
| 12 January 2010 | Sam Lechmere | Grays Athletic | Released | |
| 2 April 2010 | Darren Way | n/a | Retired | |
| 9 May 2010 | Terry Skiverton | n/a | Retired | |
| 30 June 2010 | Aidan Downes | Shamrock Rovers | Released | |
| 30 June 2010 | Richard Martin | Havant & Waterlooville | Released | |
| 30 June 2010 | Scott Murray | Bath City | Released | |
| 30 June 2010 | Terrell Forbes | Leyton Orient | Rejected new contract | |
| 30 June 2010 | Keiran Murtagh | Wycombe Wanderers | Rejected new contract | |
| 30 June 2010 | Gavin Tomlin | Dagenham & Redbridge | Rejected new contract | |

=== Loan in ===
| Date | Name | From | End date | Ref |
|---|---|---|---|---|
| 14 July 2009 | Steven Caulker | Tottenham Hotspur | 9 May 2010 | |
| 14 July 2009 | Ryan Mason | Tottenham Hotspur | 13 March 2010 | |
| 23 July 2009 | Alex McCarthy | Reading | 9 May 2010 | |
| 11 August 2009 | Jonathan Obika | Tottenham Hotspur | 11 February 2010 | |
| 21 September 2009 | Shaun MacDonald | Swansea City | 23 December 2009 | |
| 25 September 2009 | Craig Davies | Brighton & Hove Albion | 22 October 2009 | |
| 1 January 2010 | Shaun MacDonald | Swansea City | 8 May 2010 | |
| 27 January 2010 | Owain Tudur Jones | Norwich City | 27 February 2010 | |
| 11 February 2010 | Arron Davies | Brighton & Hove Albion | 9 May 2010 | |
| 11 March 2010 | Gavin Williams | Bristol City | 9 May 2010 | |
| 15 March 2010 | Scott Davies | Reading | 10 April 2010 | |
| 17 March 2010 | Luke Ayling | Arsenal | 9 May 2010 | |

=== Loan out ===
| Date | Name | To | End date | Ref |
|---|---|---|---|---|
| 30 October 2009 | Louis Lavers | Dorchester Town | 30 November 2009 | |
| 30 October 2009 | Andre McCollin | Dorchester Town | 30 November 2009 | |
| 12 February 2010 | Richard Martin | Grays Athletic | 24 April 2010 | |
| 26 February 2010 | Rhys Baggridge | Sherborne Town | 5 May 2010 | |
| 26 February 2010 | Robert Clowes | Sherborne Town | 9 May 2010 | |

== Match results ==
=== League One ===
| Date | League position | Opponents | Venue | Result | Score F–A | Scorers | Attendance | Ref |
|---|---|---|---|---|---|---|---|---|
| 8 August 2009 | 4th | Tranmere Rovers | H | W | 2–0 | Bowditch, Tomlin (pen) | 4,349 | |
| 15 August 2009 | 10th | Colchester United | A | L | 1–2 | Mason | 4,263 | |
| 18 August 2009 | 9th | Exeter City | A | D | 1–1 | Mason | 6,650 | |
| 22 August 2009 | 9th | Leyton Orient | H | D | 3–3 | Tomlin (pen), Obika, Schofield | 3,827 | |
| 29 August 2009 | 12th | Huddersfield Town | A | L | 1–2 | Murtagh | 12,646 | |
| 5 September 2009 | 17th | Swindon Town | H | L | 0–1 | | 4,807 | |
| 12 September 2009 | 17th | Stockport County | H | D | 2–2 | Tomlin, S. Williams | 3,519 | |
| 19 September 2009 | 20th | Southampton | A | L | 0–2 | | 19,907 | |
| 26 September 2009 | 17th | Brentford | H | W | 2–0 | Alcock, Welsh | 4,249 | |
| 29 September 2009 | 17th | Millwall | A | D | 0–0 | | 6,617 | |
| 3 October 2009 | 18th | Oldham Athletic | A | D | 0–0 | | 4,208 | |
| 10 October 2009 | 17th | Brighton & Hove Albion | H | D | 2–2 | Murray (2, 1 pen) | 4,412 | |
| 17 October 2009 | 14th | Carlisle United | H | W | 3–1 | Mason (2), Murtagh | 4,333 | |
| 24 October 2009 | 12th | Bristol Rovers | A | W | 2–1 | Obika, Forbes | 7,812 | |
| 31 October 2009 | 14th | Leeds United | A | L | 0–4 | | 24,482 | |
| 14 November 2009 | 12th | Southend United | H | W | 1–0 | Bowditch | 3,906 | |
| 21 November 2009 | 13th | Charlton Athletic | H | D | 1–1 | Obika | 5,632 | |
| 24 November 2009 | 13th | Gillingham | A | L | 0–1 | | 4,450 | |
| 1 December 2009 | 14th | Walsall | H | L | 1–3 | Obika | 3,508 | |
| 5 December 2009 | 13th | Milton Keynes Dons | A | D | 2–2 | Bowditch, MacDonald | 8,695 | |
| 12 December 2009 | 15th | Norwich City | H | D | 3–3 | Bowditch, MacDonald, Obika | 4,964 | |
| 19 December 2009 | 17th | Hartlepool United | A | D | 1–1 | S.Williams | 2,778 | |
| 26 December 2009 | 13th | Wycombe Wanderers | H | W | 4–0 | Murtagh, Kalala, Obika, S. Williams | 5,055 | |
| 28 December 2009 | 14th | Swindon Town | A | L | 1–3 | Tomlin | 8,059 | |
| 19 January 2010 | 16th | Leyton Orient | A | L | 0–2 | | 2,669 | |
| 23 January 2010 | 12th | Exeter City | H | W | 2–1 | Stam, Mason | 6,282 | |
| 26 January 2010 | 13th | Tranmere Rovers | A | L | 1–2 | Mason (pen) | 4,584 | |
| 30 January 2010 | 14th | Huddersfield Town | H | L | 0–1 | | 4,110 | |
| 6 February 2010 | 14th | Wycombe Wanderers | A | W | 4–1 | Bowditch (2), Welsh, Tudur Jones | 4,793 | |
| 13 February 2010 | 14th | Gillingham | H | D | 0–0 | | 3,853 | |
| 16 February 2010 | 14th | Colchester United | H | L | 0–1 | | 3,469 | |
| 20 February 2010 | 15th | Charlton Athletic | A | L | 0–2 | | 15,991 | |
| 23 February 2010 | 13th | Walsall | A | W | 1–0 | S. Williams | 2,929 | |
| 27 February 2010 | 12th | Milton Keynes Dons | H | W | 1–0 | MacDonald | 3,844 | |
| 6 March 2010 | 13th | Norwich City | A | L | 0–3 | | 24,868 | |
| 13 March 2010 | 11th | Hartlepool United | H | W | 4–0 | Tomlin (pen), G. Williams, Collins (og), Bowditch | 4,169 | |
| 16 March 2010 | 12th | Carlisle United | A | L | 0–1 | | 3,731 | |
| 20 March 2010 | 13th | Bristol Rovers | H | L | 0–3 | | 5,968 | |
| 3 April 2010 | 15th | Southend United | A | D | 0–0 | | 6,854 | |
| 5 April 2010 | 15th | Leeds United | H | L | 1–3 | Bowditch | 6,308 | |
| 10 April 2010 | 14th | Stockport County | A | W | 3–1 | Bowditch, G. Williams (2) | 3,587 | |
| 13 April 2010 | 14th | Millwall | H | D | 1–1 | Bowditch | 4,713 | |
| 17 April 2010 | 17th | Southampton | H | L | 0–1 | | 7,484 | |
| 24 April 2010 | 17th | Brentford | A | D | 1–1 | Tomlin (pen) | 5,395 | |
| 1 May 2010 | 15th | Oldham Athletic | H | W | 3–0 | Tomlin, G. Williams (2) | 4,513 | |
| 8 May 2010 | 15th | Brighton & Hove Albion | A | L | 0–1 | | 7,323 | |

==== League table ====
| Pos | Team | Pld | W | D | L | GF | GA | GD | Pts |
|---|---|---|---|---|---|---|---|---|---|
| 13 | Brighton & Hove Albion | 46 | 15 | 14 | 17 | 56 | 60 | −4 | 59 |
| 14 | Carlisle United | 46 | 15 | 13 | 18 | 63 | 66 | −3 | 58 |
| 15 | Yeovil Town | 46 | 13 | 14 | 19 | 55 | 59 | −4 | 53 |
| 16 | Oldham Athletic | 46 | 13 | 13 | 20 | 39 | 57 | −18 | 52 |
| 17 | Leyton Orient | 46 | 13 | 12 | 21 | 53 | 63 | −10 | 51 |

Source: The Football League
Rules for classification: 1) points; 2) goal difference; 3) number of goals scored.

=== FA Cup ===
| Round | Date | Opponents | Venue | Result | Score F–A | Scorers | Attendance | Ref |
|---|---|---|---|---|---|---|---|---|
| First round | 7 November 2009 | Oxford United | A | L | 0–1 | | 6,144 | |

=== League Cup ===
| Round | Date | Opponents | Venue | Result | Score F–A | Scorers | Attendance | Ref |
|---|---|---|---|---|---|---|---|---|
| First round | 11 August 2009 | Norwich City | H | L | 0–4 | | 3,860 | |

=== Football League Trophy ===
| Round | Date | Opponents | Venue | Result | Score F–A | Scorers | Attendance | Ref |
|---|---|---|---|---|---|---|---|---|
| First round | 1 September 2009 | Bournemouth | A | L | 1–2 | Obika | 2,655 | |

== Statistics ==
=== Player details ===
Numbers in parentheses denote appearances as substitute.

| No. | Position | Nationality | Name | Apps | Goals | Apps | Goals | Apps | Goals | Apps | Goals | Apps | Goals | Yellow card | Red card |
| No. | Position | Nationality | Name | League | | FA Cup | | League Cup | | FL Trophy | | Total | | Discipline | |
|---|---|---|---|---|---|---|---|---|---|---|---|---|---|---|---|
| 1 | Goalkeeper | England | Alex McCarthy | 44 | 0 | 0 | 0 | 1 | 0 | 0 | 0 | 45 | 0 | 0 | 1 |
| 2 | Defender | England | Craig Alcock | 39 (3) | 1 | 1 | 0 | 0 | 0 | 0 | 0 | 40 (3) | 1 | 4 | 0 |
| 3 | Defender | Wales | Nathan Jones | 17 | 0 | 1 | 0 | 1 | 0 | 0 | 0 | 19 | 0 | 5 | 0 |
| 4 | Defender | Netherlands | Stefan Stam | 18 | 1 | 0 | 0 | 1 | 0 | 1 | 0 | 20 | 1 | 4 | 0 |
| 5 | Defender | England | Steven Caulker | 44 | 0 | 1 | 0 | 1 | 0 | 0 | 0 | 46 | 0 | 2 | 0 |
| 6 | Defender | England | Terrell Forbes | 35 (3) | 1 | 1 | 0 | 1 | 0 | 1 | 0 | 38 (3) | 1 | 8 | 0 |
| 7 | Midfielder | Ireland | George O'Callaghan | 7 (5) | 0 | 0 (1) | 0 | 1 | 0 | 1 | 0 | 9 (6) | 0 | 3 | 0 |
| 7 | Midfielder | Wales | Arron Davies | 4 (6) | 0 | 0 | 0 | 0 | 0 | 0 | 0 | 4 (6) | 0 | 0 | 0 |
| 8 | Midfielder | England | Keiran Murtagh | 13 (14) | 3 | 1 | 0 | 1 | 0 | 0 | 0 | 15 (14) | 3 | 3 | 0 |
| 9 | Forward | England | Sam Williams | 28 (6) | 4 | 1 | 0 | 1 | 0 | 1 | 0 | 31 (6) | 4 | 6 | 0 |
| 10 | Forward | England | Gavin Tomlin | 29 (6) | 7 | 0 | 0 | 1 | 0 | 1 | 0 | 31 (6) | 7 | 8 | 0 |
| 11 | Midfielder | England | Andy Welsh | 28 (14) | 2 | 1 | 0 | 1 | 0 | 0 | 0 | 31 (14) | 2 | 2 | 0 |
| 12 | Midfielder | England | Darren Way | 0 | 0 | 0 | 0 | 0 | 0 | 0 | 0 | 0 | 0 | 0 | 0 |
| 13 | Midfielder | England | Ryan Mason | 26 (2) | 6 | 1 | 0 | 0 | 0 | 0 | 0 | 27 (2) | 6 | 4 | 0 |
| 14 | Forward | England | Dean Bowditch | 26 (4) | 10 | 0 | 0 | 0 | 0 | 0 | 0 | 26 (4) | 10 | 1 | 0 |
| 15 | Goalkeeper | England | Richard Martin | 2 (1) | 0 | 1 | 0 | 0 | 0 | 1 | 0 | 04 (1) | 0 | 0 | 0 |
| 16 | Midfielder | Scotland | Scott Murray | 10 (10) | 2 | 0 | 0 | 1 | 0 | 1 | 0 | 12 (10) | 2 | 0 | 0 |
| 17 | Midfielder | Ireland | Aidan Downes | 2 (3) | 0 | 0 | 0 | 0 | 0 | 0 | 0 | 2 (3) | 0 | 0 | 0 |
| 18 | Defender | England | Andy Lindegaard | 2 (3) | 0 | 0 | 0 | 0 | 0 | 1 | 0 | 3 (3) | 0 | 0 | 0 |
| 19 | Defender | England | Luke Ayling | 1 (3) | 0 | 0 | 0 | 0 | 0 | 0 | 0 | 1 (3) | 0 | 0 | 0 |
| 20 | Midfielder | Wales | Owain Tudur Jones | 6 | 1 | 0 | 0 | 0 | 0 | 0 | 0 | 6 | 1 | 0 | 0 |
| 20 | Midfielder | Wales | Gavin Williams | 7 (1) | 5 | 0 | 0 | 0 | 0 | 0 | 0 | 7 (1) | 5 | 1 | 1 |
| 21 | Midfielder | DR Congo | Jean-Paul Kalala | 32 (2) | 1 | 0 | 0 | 0 | 0 | 0 | 0 | 32 (2) | 1 | 15 | 1 |
| 22 | Midfielder | England | Danny Schofield | 4 | 1 | 0 | 0 | 0 | 1 | 0 | 0 | 5 | 1 | 1 | 0 |
| 22 | Defender | England | Louis Lavers | 0 | 0 | 0 | 0 | 0 | 0 | 0 | 0 | 0 | 0 | 0 | 0 |
| 23 | Defender | England | Danny Hutchins | 4 (3) | 0 | 0 (1) | 0 | 0 | 0 | 1 | 0 | 5 (4) | 0 | 2 | 0 |
| 24 | Defender | England | Terry Skiverton | 0 | 0 | 0 | 0 | 0 | 0 | 0 | 0 | 0 | 0 | 0 | 0 |
| 25 | Midfielder | Wales | Shaun MacDonald | 31 | 3 | 1 | 0 | 0 | 0 | 0 | 0 | 32 | 3 | 0 | 0 |
| 26 | Forward | England | Jonathan Obika | 13 (9) | 6 | 1 | 0 | 0 (1) | 0 | 1 | 1 | 15 (10) | 7 | 3 | 0 |
| 27 | Midfielder | Ireland | Scott Davies | 4 | 0 | 0 | 0 | 0 | 0 | 0 | 0 | 4 | 0 | 0 | 0 |
| 28 | Defender | England | Nathan Smith | 28 (7) | 0 | 0 | 0 | 0 (1) | 0 | 1 | 0 | 29 (8) | 0 | 10 | 0 |
| 29 | Midfielder | England | Sam Lechmere | 0 | 0 | 0 | 0 | 0 | 0 | 0 | 0 | 0 | 0 | 0 | 0 |
| 30 | Forward | Wales | Craig Davies | 2 (2) | 0 | 0 | 0 | 0 | 0 | 0 | 0 | 2 (2) | 0 | 0 | 0 |
| 32 | Forward | Wales | Andre McCollin | 0 (2) | 0 | 0 | 0 | 0 | 0 | 0 (1) | 0 | 0 (3) | 0 | 0 | 0 |
| 33 | Goalkeeper | England | Ben Roberts | 0 | 0 | 0 | 0 | 0 | 0 | 0 | 0 | 0 | 0 | 0 | 0 |
| – | Midfielder | England | Gary Roberts | 0 | 0 | 0 | 0 | 0 | 0 | 0 | 0 | 0 | 0 | 0 | 0 |

== See also ==
- 2009–10 in English football
- List of Yeovil Town F.C. seasons
