= Nathan Smith (footballer, born 1987) =

Footballer (born 1987)

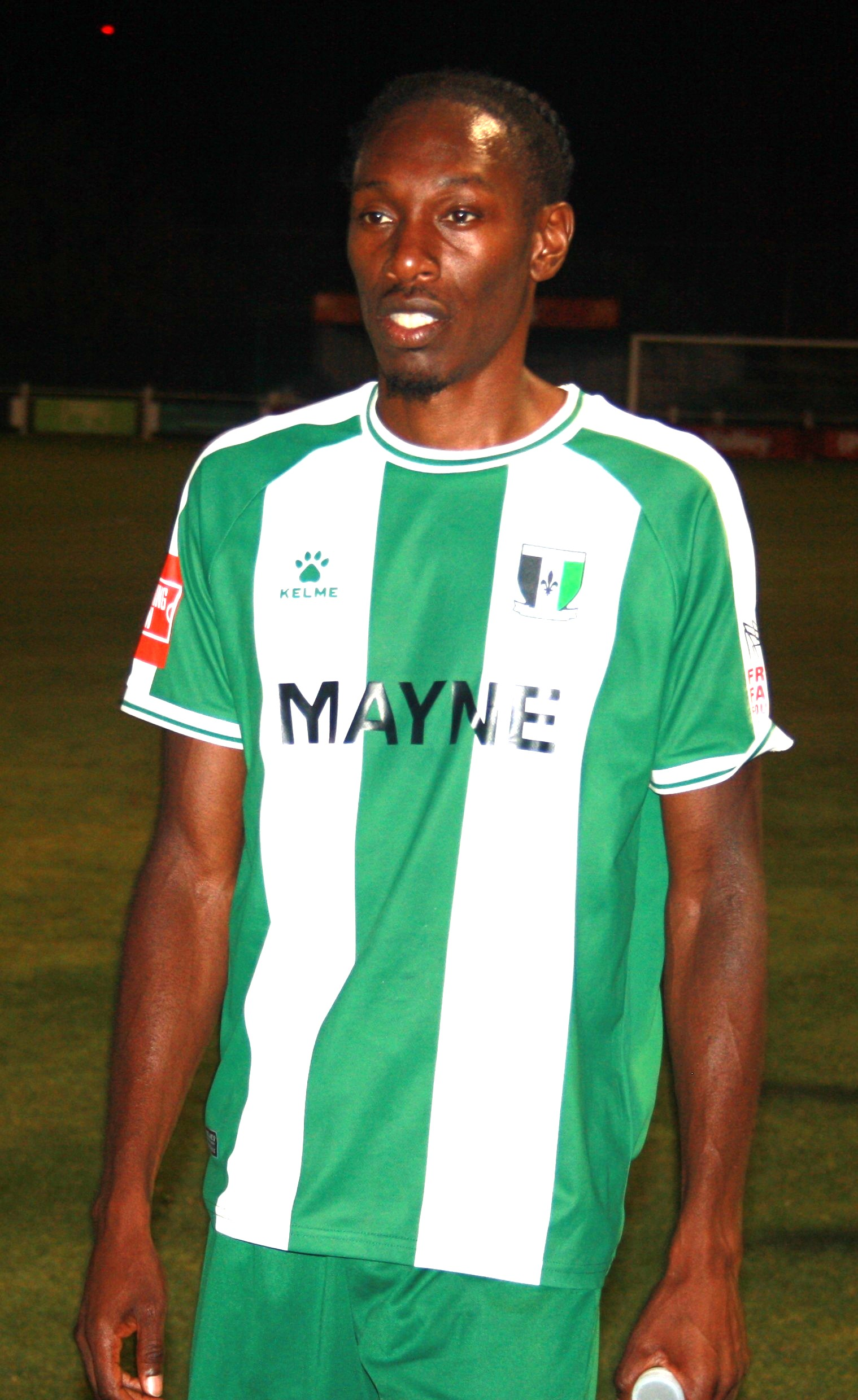
- Smith playing for Cray Valley Paper Mills in 2026

Personal information
- Full name: Nathan Colin Leslie Smith
- Date of birth: 11 January 1987 (age 39)
- Place of birth: Enfield, England
- Height: 1.83 m (6 ft 0 in)
- Positions: Left-back; centre-back

Team information
- Current team: Cray Valley Paper Mills

Senior career*
Years	Team	Apps	(Gls)
2005–2007	Enfield	22	(0)
2007	Waltham Forest	9	(2)
2007–2008	Potters Bar Town	15	(0)
2008–2011	Yeovil Town	113	(1)
2011–2014	Chesterfield	68	(0)
2014–2018	Yeovil Town	146	(4)
2018–2019	Dagenham & Redbridge	12	(1)
2019–2020	Dulwich Hamlet	9	(0)
2020–2021	Braintree Town	9	(0)
2021–2022	Enfield Town	42	(4)
2022–2023	Concord Rangers	10	(1)
2023–2026	Hashtag United	113	(12)
2026–	Cray Valley Paper Mills	0	(0)

International career^{‡}
2011–2012	Jamaica	2	(0)
- * Club domestic league appearances and goals as of 15:48, 29 June 2026 (UTC) ‡ National team caps and goals as of 16:54, 1 June 2012 (UTC)

Nathan Colin Leslie Smith (born 11 January 1987) is a professional footballer who plays as a left-back or centre-back for Isthmian League South East Division side Cray Valley Paper Mills. Born in England, he represented Jamaica internationally.

He started his career with part-time London clubs Enfield, Waltham Forest and Potters Bar Town. During his time at these clubs, he also worked as a computer analyst, before being discovered by League One side Yeovil Town.

== Club career ==
=== Early career ===
Smith started his football career at Enfield joining as a teenager and making 22 appearances, he then had a brief spell at Waltham Forest before signing for Isthmian League side Potters Bar Town. His then manager Steve Browne, an ex-Yeovil player, recommended him along with four others to his former club Yeovil Town.

=== Yeovil Town ===
Smith went on trial in January 2008 with the club, appearing in five games, before agreeing non-contract terms on 23 March to enable him to make his début the next day away at Hartlepool United as a 61st-minute substitute. He then signed a permanent two-year professional deal with the club, leaving his IT job. He then proceeded to start every game until the end of the season. He scored his first professional goal on 13 December 2008 with a shot from 30 yards in the 4–2 defeat to Stockport County. Smith was offered a new contract at Yeovil but it was stated that Reading, Sheffield United and Ipswich Town were all interested in his services, but despite this, he signed a new contract with Yeovil. He was informed by the club at the end of the 2010/11 season that he was one of seven Yeovil players who would be awarded new contracts.

=== Chesterfield ===
After rejecting this new contract offer, Smith left Yeovil after 119 appearances and moved to newly promoted side Chesterfield signing a two-year contract. Unfortunately, in his first season with the club Smith experienced relegation to Football League Two, during that season he was used primarily as a squad player. In 2012–2013 he experienced his best season at the Proact Stadium, becoming a regular until a broken foot halted his season in March 2013. Despite that Smith was named Player of the Year by both supporters and players. An injury-hit campaign and the arrival of Ritchie Humphreys meant that Smith only started 12 League games in Chesterfield's League 2 Championship season.

=== Return to Yeovil Town ===
Smith decided at the end of the season to move back to Yeovil Town on a two-year deal starting on 1 July 2014. On 30 April 2016, he scored his second goal for the club in a 4–3 victory against Barnet. He was released by Yeovil at the end of the 2017–18 season.

=== Dagenham & Redbridge ===
On 25 October 2018, Smith signed for National League side Dagenham & Redbridge on a deal until the end of the season. In May 2019, it was announced that he would be released following the expiration of his contract at the end of the 2018–19 campaign.

=== Hashtag United ===
On 4 March 2023, Smith signed for Isthmian League North Division side Hashtag United and scored two goals on his debut against Tilbury in an 8–1 victory.

=== Cray Valley Paper Mills ===
In June 2026, Smith joined Isthmian League South East Division club Cray Valley Paper Mills.

== International career ==
Smith made his international début for the Jamaica against Honduras on 12 October 2011. He has won one further cap against Guyana in May 2012, both games were friendlies.

== Career statistics ==
=== Club ===
As of end of 2025–26 season

Appearances and goals by club, season and competition
Club	Season	League			FA Cup		League Cup		Other		Total	
Club	Season	Division	Apps	Goals	Apps	Goals	Apps	Goals	Apps	Goals	Apps	Goals
Yeovil Town	2007–08	League One	7	0	0	0	0	0	0	0	7	0
Yeovil Town	2008–09	League One	31	1	0	0	1	0	0	0	32	1
Yeovil Town	2009–10	League One	35	0	0	0	1	0	1 (Note: Appearance(s) in EFL Trophy)	0	37	0
Yeovil Town	2010–11	League One	40	0	0	0	1	0	1	0	42	0
Yeovil Town	Total		113	1	0	0	3	0	2	0	118	1
Chesterfield	2011–12	League One	25	0	1	0	1	0	2	0	29	0
Chesterfield	2012–13	League Two	29	0	2	0	1	0	0	0	32	0
Chesterfield	2013–14	League Two	14	0	0	0	1	0	0	0	15	0
Chesterfield	Total		68	0	3	0	3	0	2	0	76	0
Yeovil Town	2014–15	League One	41	0	3	0	1	0	1	0	46	0
Yeovil Town	2015–16	League Two	40	1	3	0	1	0	4	0	48	1
Yeovil Town	2016–17	League Two	33	2	1	0	1	0	6 (Note: Appearances in EFL Trophy)	0	41	2
Yeovil Town	2017–18	League Two	31	1	5	0	1	0	4	1	41	2
Yeovil Town	Total		146	4	12	0	4	0	15	1	177	5
Dagenham & Redbridge	2018–19	National League	12	1	0	0	—		0	0	12	1
Dulwich Hamlet	2019–20	National League South	9	0	1	0	—		4 (Note: Three appearances in FA Trophy, one appearance in London Senior Cup)	0	14	0
Braintree Town	2020–21	National League South	9	0	—		—		1 (Note: Appearance in FA Trophy)	0	10	0
Enfield Town	2021–22	Isthmian League Premier Division	42	4	4	0	—		4 (Note: Three appearances in FA Trophy, one appearance and one goal in Middlesex Senior Cup)	1	50	5
Concord Rangers	2022–23	National League South	10	1	—		—		0	0	10	1
Hashtag United	2022–23	Isthmian League North Division	5	2	—		—		—		5	2
Hashtag United	2023–24	Isthmian League Premier Division	38	4	2	0	—		10 (Note: One appearance in FA Trophy, five appearances in Alan Turvey Trophy, four appearances and one goal in Essex Senior Cup)	1	50	5
Hashtag United	2024–25	Isthmian League Premier Division	30	3	2	0	—		10 (Note: Four appearances in FA Trophy, three appearances in Alan Turvey Trophy, two appearances and one goal in Essex Senior Cup, one appearance in Essex Thames-Side Trophy)	1	42	4
Hashtag United	2025–26	Isthmian League Premier Division	40	3	1	0	—		4 (Note: Appearance(s) in Alan Turvey Trophy)	1	45	4
Hashtag United	Total		113	12	5	0	—		24	3	142	15
Career total			522	23	25	0	10	0	52	5	609	28

=== International ===
As of match played 18 May 2012

Appearances and goals by national team and year
National team	Year	Apps	Goals
Jamaica	2011	1	0
Jamaica	2012	1	0
Total		2	0

== Honours ==
Chesterfield

- Football League Two: 2013–14
- Football League Trophy: 2011–12

Hashtag United

- Isthmian League North Division: 2022–23
