= Gavin Tomlin =

English footballer

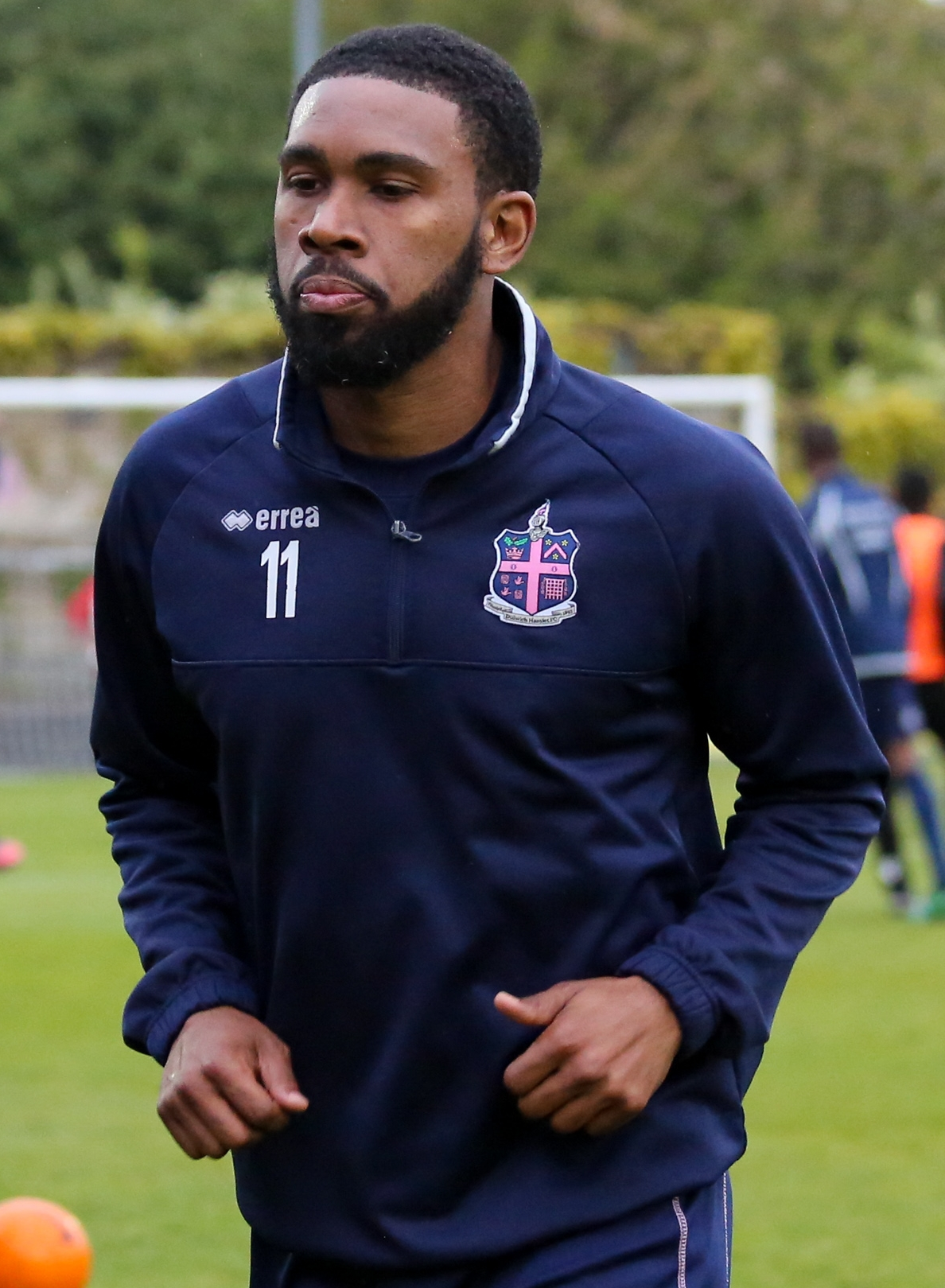
- Tomlin warming up for Dulwich Hamlet in 2017.

Personal information
- Full name: Gavin Glenrick Tomlin
- Date of birth: 21 August 1983 (age 43)
- Place of birth: Gillingham, Kent, England
- Height: 6 ft 0 in (1.83 m)
- Positions: Striker; winger

Youth career
- Gillingham
- Tooting & Mitcham United

Senior career*
Years	Team	Apps	(Gls)
2002	Ashford Town (Kent)	1	(1)
2002	Aylesbury United	1	(0)
2003–2005	Staines Town		
2005	→ St Albans City (loan)	7	(1)
2005–2006	Yeading	12	(0)
2006	Windsor & Eton	7	(3)
2006	Brentford	12	(0)
2007–2008	Fisher Athletic		
2008–2010	Yeovil Town	77	(14)
2010–2012	Dagenham & Redbridge	36	(2)
2011	→ Torquay United (loan)	12	(4)
2012	→ Gillingham (loan)	10	(6)
2012–2013	Southend United	33	(13)
2013–2014	Port Vale	24	(5)
2014–2016	Crawley Town	51	(3)
2016–2019	Dulwich Hamlet	74	(12)
2019–2022	Cray Valley Paper Mills	38	(23)
Total		394	(87)
- * Club domestic league appearances and goals

Gavin Glenrick Tomlin (born 21 August 1983) is an English former professional footballer. He was a versatile player who could play as a striker, on both left and right wings and attacking midfield.

A former Gillingham youth team player, he played non-League football for Ashford Town (Kent), Aylesbury United, Staines Town, St Albans City, Yeading and Windsor & Eton, before having a brief spell in the English Football League with Brentford in 2006. He returned to the non-League scene with Fisher Athletic before winning a contract at Yeovil Town in June 2008. Two years later, he switched to Dagenham & Redbridge, but was not a success at his new club and was loaned out to Torquay United and Gillingham. He signed with Southend United in July 2012 and played in the club's defeat in the 2013 Football League Trophy final. He joined Port Vale in June 2013 and stayed with the club for one season before moving on to Crawley Town. Following two seasons with Crawley, he joined Dulwich Hamlet in the summer of 2016. He went on to help the club win promotion out of the Isthmian League Premier Division via the play-offs in 2018 before moving on to Cray Valley Paper Mills in January 2019. Mills won the Southern Counties East League Premier Division title in the 2018–19 season and reached the 2019 FA Vase final.

== Career ==
=== Early career ===
Tomlin was a youth team player at Gillingham. He subsequently joined Tooting & Mitcham United and from there joined Southern League Eastern Division club Ashford Town (Kent) on 17 January 2002 and later day scored the winning goal in a 3–2 league victory over Tonbridge. Tomlin joined Aylesbury United the following season and on 26 November 2002 he scored a goal in a 4–0 win over Wokingham Town in the Berks & Bucks Senior Cup. He then played one Isthmian League match on 14 December, in a 1–1 draw with Basingstoke Town.

He signed with Staines Town in December 2003, having spent some time out of the game after breaking his leg during a trial at Barnet. He scored 11 minutes into his "Swans" debut. He had a trial with Notts County in June 2004. He scored 13 goals in the 2004–05 season, but left Staines in March to go on trial at Exeter City. The following month, he joined Conference South club St Albans City on loan. He moved on to Conference South side Yeading, but made only five starts and eight substitute appearances in the 2005–06 season. He went on to have a brief stay at Isthmian League side Windsor & Eton.

Tomlin signed a one-year contract with Leroy Rosenior's Brentford in July 2006. He failed to break into the "Bees" first-team (despite a man of the match performance against Northampton early in the 2006–07 season). His contract was terminated by mutual consent on 30 January 2007. He joined Conference South club Fisher Athletic in February 2007. He helped the "Fish" to secure a play-off place in the 2007–08 season with a fourth-place finish.

=== Yeovil Town ===
Tomlin joined League One club Yeovil Town on trial in June 2008. His trial was successful as he impressed enough to win a two-year contract from Russell Slade; Tomlin stated that "this is my third chance at league football and I am not going to let it slip this time." He finished the 2008–09 season as the "Glovers" leading goalscorer with nine goals. Included in this tally was a goal against Premier League side Middlesbrough in a 5–1 defeat at the Riverside Stadium. He found the net seven times in 35 league games in the 2009–10 campaign. On 16 June 2010, he agreed to sign a new contract with Yeovil boss Terry Skiverton, though he later changed his mind and left Huish Park on a free transfer.

=== Dagenham & Redbridge ===
In June 2010, Tomlin signed a three-year deal with League One newcomers Dagenham & Redbridge. However, he made only 16 starts in the 2010–11 season, scoring just two goals as John Still's "Daggers" were relegated in 21st-place. He joined Paul Buckle's League Two side Torquay United on a one-month loan in March 2011, which was later extended until the end of the season. He played in the play-off final, as the "Gulls" were beaten 1–0 by Stevenage at Old Trafford. He played 22 matches for Dagenham in the 2011–12 without scoring a goal at Victoria Road. In January 2012, he signed for Gillingham on loan until the end of the season. He scored six goals in ten League Two games for Andy Hessenthaler's "Gills", but was sidelined from March onwards after picking up a hamstring injury.

=== Southend United ===
In July 2012, Tomlin signed for Southend United on a one-year contract after being tracked by manager Paul Sturrock for five years. He scored 16 goals in 42 games in the 2012–13 season for the "Shrimpers". He finished as joint top scorer with strike partner Britt Assombalonga. He did, though, go 13 games without a goal and thanked Paul Sturrock for sticking by him during this spell before the start of the 2013 Football League Trophy final even though Sturrock had by then been replaced by Phil Brown. Southend were beaten 2–0 by Crewe Alexandra in the Wembley final.

=== Port Vale ===
He signed with newly-promoted League One club Port Vale in June 2013. Upon joining the club he stated that he was expecting to play as a striker, rather than as a utility forward, though he admitted he faced a challenge in dislodging either of free-scoring duo Tom Pope and Lee Hughes. He was dropped from the starting line-up after failing to find the net in his first few games, and then spent a month out injured with ankle, hamstring and toe troubles. He returned to action in December, and scored in four consecutive games. He finished the 2013–14 campaign with six goals in only 28 appearances; in the summer Southend United manager Phil Brown confirmed that he was attempting to re-sign Tomlin. Tomlin decided to move back to his native London, and determined on a move South from the Midlands.

=== Crawley Town ===
Tomlin joined League One side Crawley Town for an undisclosed fee in June 2014 as "Reds" manager John Gregory stated "I have always admired Gavin". He scored three goals in 40 appearances in the 2014–15 season as Crawley were relegated into League Two. He was released by new manager Dermot Drummy after making just 17 appearances in the 2015–16 campaign.

=== Later career ===
Tomlin joined Isthmian League Premier Division club Dulwich Hamlet in August 2016, following a successful trial ahead of the 2016–17 season. He went on to score 19 goals in 60 appearances across all competitions in his first season at the club, and helped Hamlet to the play-off final, where they were beaten 2–1 by Bognor Regis Town. The Hamlet again qualified for the play-offs with a second-place finish in the 2017–18 campaign, and Tomlin scored the equalising goal in the final against Hendon at Imperial Fields before Hamlet secured promotion with a victory in the penalty shoot-out.

On 23 January 2019, Tomlin joined Southern Counties East League Premier Division club Cray Valley Paper Mills. He scored on his debut for the club against Lordswood on 23 January 2019. The "Millers" won the league title at the end of the 2018–19 season and reached the 2019 FA Vase final. Tomlin scored in the final at Wembley Stadium, but Mills were beaten by 3–1 Chertsey Town after extra time. The 2019–20 Isthmian League season was formally abandoned on 26 March, with all results from the season being expunged, due to the COVID-19 pandemic in England. He did not feature in the 2020–21 season, but scored one goal from twelve appearances in the 2021–22 campaign.

== Style of play ==
In June 2010, Dagenham & Redbridge manager John Still stated Tomlin to be "a clever striker with good movement who links play well. He's a hard worker who is equally adept playing as a forward or wide." Speaking in March 2011, Torquay manager Paul Buckle described Tomlin as a player that was "big, strong and has plenty of pace".

"One of the things I like about him is that if the ball goes astray he's still hungry and always wants it, and when he's on the ball things might happen. He has a confidence about him, and that's what you need. You can't go hiding in that position."

— Yeovil Town boss Russell Slade speaking in July 2008.

== Personal life ==
As a boy he supported Newcastle United and looked up to Andy Cole.

== Career statistics ==
Appearances and goals by club, season and competition (Note: Statistics for Staines Town, Windsor & Eton and Fisher Athletic unavailable.)
Club	Season	League			FA Cup		League Cup		Other		Total	
Club	Season	Division	Apps	Goals	Apps	Goals	Apps	Goals	Apps	Goals	Apps	Goals
Ashford Town (Kent)	2001–02	Southern League; Eastern Division	1	1	0	0	—		1 (Note: Appearance in Kent Senior Cup)	0	2	1
Aylesbury United	2002–03	Isthmian League; Premier Division	1	0	0	0	—		1 (Note: Appearance in Berks & Bucks Senior Cup)	1	2	1
St Albans City (loan)	2004–05	Conference South	7	1	—		—		1 (Note: Appearance in Herts Senior Cup)	0	8	1
Yeading	2005–06	Conference South	12	0	0	0	—		1 (Note: Appearances in FA Trophy)	0	13	0
Windsor & Eton	2005–06	Isthmian League; Premier Division	7	3	—		—		—		7	3
Brentford	2006–07	League One	12	0	0	0	1	0	2 (Note: Appearances in Football League Trophy)	0	15	0
Yeovil Town	2008–09	League One	42	7	2	0	2	1	1	1	47	9
Yeovil Town	2009–10	League One	35	7	0	0	1	0	1	0	37	7
Yeovil Town	Total		77	14	2	0	3	1	2	1	84	16
Dagenham & Redbridge	2010–11	League One	19	2	1	0	0	0	0	0	20	2
Dagenham & Redbridge	2011–12	League Two	17	0	2	0	1	0	2	0	22	0
Dagenham & Redbridge	Total		36	2	3	0	1	0	2	0	42	2
Torquay United (loan)	2010–11	League Two	12	4	—		—		3 (Note: Three appearances in League Two play-offs)	0	15	4
Gillingham (loan)	2011–12	League Two	10	6	—		—		—		10	6
Southend United	2012–13	League Two	33	13	5	2	0	0	4	1	42	16
Port Vale	2013–14	League One	24	5	3	1	1	0	0	0	28	6
Crawley Town	2014–15	League One	35	3	1	0	1	0	3	0	40	3
Crawley Town	2015–16	League Two	16	0	0	0	0	0	1	0	17	0
Crawley Town	Total		51	3	1	0	1	0	4	0	57	3
Dulwich Hamlet	2016–17	Isthmian League; Premier Division	40	11	3	2	—		18 (Note: Nine appearances and three goals in FA Trophy, four appearances and two goals in Alan Turvey Trophy, two appearances in London Senior Cup, three appearances and one goal in Isthmian League play-offs)	6	61	19
Dulwich Hamlet	2017–18	Isthmian League; Premier Division	17	0	0	0	—		4 (Note: 2 appearances and 1 goal in Isthmian League Premier Division play-offs, 1 appearance in FA Trophy, 1 appearance in Isthmian League Cup)	2	21	2
Dulwich Hamlet	2018–19	National League South	17	1	0	0	—		1	0	18	1
Dulwich Hamlet	Total		74	12	3	2	—		23	8	100	22
Cray Valley Paper Mills	2018–19	Southern Counties East; Premier Division	17	13	—		—		4 (Note: Appearances in FA Vase)	3	21	16
Cray Valley Paper Mills	2019–20	Isthmian League; South East Division	13	9	0	0	—		1 (Note: Appearance in the London Challenge Cup)	0	14	9
Cray Valley Paper Mills	2020–21	Isthmian League; South East Division	0	0	0	0	—		0	0	0	0
Cray Valley Paper Mills	2021–22	Isthmian League; South East Division	8	1	1	0	—		3 (Note: 1 appearance in FA Trophy, 1 appearance in Isthmian League Cup, 1 appearance in the London Challenge Cup)	0	12	1
Cray Valley Paper Mills	Total		38	23	1	0	—		8	3	47	26
Career total			395	87	18	5	7	1	52	14	472	107

== Honours ==
St Albans City

- Herts Senior Cup: 2004–05

Southend United

- Football League Trophy runner-up: 2012–13

Dulwich Hamlet

- Isthmian League Premier Division play-offs: 2018

Cray Valley Paper Mills

- Southern Counties East League Premier Division: 2018–19
