= Andy Welsh =

Footballer (born 1983)

Personal information
- Full name: Andrew Peter David Welsh
- Date of birth: 24 January 1983 (age 43)
- Place of birth: Manchester, England
- Height: 5 ft 8 in (1.73 m)
- Position: Midfielder

Senior career*
Years	Team	Apps	(Gls)
2001–2004	Stockport County	85	(3)
2002	→ Macclesfield Town (loan)	6	(2)
2004–2007	Sunderland	25	(2)
2006	→ Leicester City (loan)	10	(1)
2006–2007	→ Leicester City (loan)	7	(0)
2007	Toronto	20	(1)
2007–2008	Blackpool	21	(0)
2008–2011	Yeovil Town	113	(6)
2011–2013	Carlisle United	33	(0)
2013–2014	Scunthorpe United	8	(0)
2014	United of Manchester	0	(0)
2014–2016	Farsley Celtic		
2017	Ossett Albion		
Total		328	(15)

International career
- Scotland U19

Managerial career
- 2017–2018: Ossett Albion (player-manager)
- 2018–2019: Ossett United
- 2020–2023: Bury
- 2023–2024: Guiseley
- * Club domestic league appearances and goals

Andrew Peter David Welsh (born 24 January 1983) is an English football coach and former player.

== Playing career ==
=== Stockport County ===
The left-footed Welsh wrote to the club asking for a trial run and made his professional debut for Stockport County in October 2001, going on to make 75 league appearances in his four-year stint at the club. His final match was a 3–0 loss to Sheffield Wednesday in League One. He also made six appearances on loan at Macclesfield Town in 2002.

=== Sunderland ===
After impressing in a three-day trial with Sunderland in November 2004, Welsh signed with the club for £15,000, and could have included a compensation for amount of time on the field stipulation to £35,000. Upon signing for Sunderland he was assigned the vacant number 11 shirt, and made his club debut on 1 January 2005 in a 3–2 defeat to Preston North End, replacing Marcus Stewart in the 68th minute. He scored two goals in eight appearances during the 2004–05 season for Sunderland.

Welsh made his first start for Sunderland a week later on 8 January 2005, scoring a free kick in a 2–1 victory against Crystal Palace. Welsh went on to make eight appearances that season, scoring again, against QPR at Loftus Road on 2 April.

After Sunderland's promotion to the Premier League, Welsh retained the number 11 shirt, starting the season in place of injured defender George McCartney. However, Welsh was controversially sent off in only the second game of the season against Liverpool at Anfield on 20 August 2005, although the decision was later overturned on appeal.

Welsh found himself out of the Sunderland team after Christmas, and many thought he had played his last game for the club after he was loaned to Championship club Leicester on 1 March 2006. Welsh went on to make ten appearances for Leicester, scoring one goal, helping to stave off relegation for the Foxes.

Four days after playing his last game for Leicester, Welsh was back at Sunderland, playing in the club's last two games, against Fulham and Aston Villa, under new caretaker manager Kevin Ball. Following the transfer of popular midfielder Julio Arca to Middlesbrough in the summer, Welsh was expected to start the season as first choice winger, however injury hit early on in pre-season.

Welsh picked up an injury during a pre-season win against League of Ireland club, Shelbourne, prompting Quinn and new manager Roy Keane to sign Swedish winger Tobias Hysen and Celtic midfielder Ross Wallace to fill the left-midfield role. Welsh subsequently re-joined Leicester on loan when he regained fitness, although he managed only four league starts for them, and returned to Sunderland in the New Year. Coincidentally, Sunderland's next game was against Leicester at the Walkers Stadium, where Welsh was named as an unused substitute.

=== Toronto ===
After failing to break back into Sunderland's first team, it was announced in March 2007, that Welsh would be heading to Canada for a medical before signing a contract with Major League Soccer (MLS) club, Toronto, after the clubs agreed a deal to end his contract at Sunderland.

On 16 May 2007, Welsh scored his first goal for Toronto in a rain soaked 1–0 home win over defending MLS champions, Houston Dynamo. Fans subsequently voted him "Man of the Match" on the club's official website. However, after the first few games Toronto struggled to find points hard to come by, Welsh was in and out of the team and soon decided to return to England.

=== Blackpool ===
On 30 August 2007, it was reported that Welsh would be leaving Toronto for Blackpool, whom he signed for the following day. During the 2007–08 season he made 21 appearances in the Championship, mostly as a substitute. On 7 May 2008 he was released by Blackpool.

=== Yeovil Town ===
In August 2008 Welsh went on trial at Football League One club Yeovil Town. On 3 September, Yeovil manager Russell Slade confirmed that the club had a verbal agreement to sign Welsh with him due to have a medical at the club the following day. Welsh signed a contract with the club until the end of the 2008–09 season. Welsh played 38 games for Yeovil in his first season, becoming a fans' favourite as the team went on a four-game winning streak scoring four goals direct from his set pieces. He ended the season with Yeovil's most assists (seven) and most crosses (80) in his 38 appearances.

At the end of the 2008–09 season, Welsh signed a new two-year deal keeping him at the club until the summer of 2011. In the 2009–10 season Welsh started well and was the divisional top goal maker with seven assists. However, formation changes saw him slip out of the side, making most of his appearances from the subs bench. However, he was Yeovil's leading creator for the second consecutive season (10 assists), and he scored his first two goals for the club, in a 2–0 win over Brentford and a 4–1 win over Wycombe.

Welsh scored in his second game of the 2010–11 season, against local rivals Exeter City, and against Tranmere Rovers two weeks later. Welsh was again one of Yeovil's outstanding performers, leading the way in assists. He secured Yeovil's league one status for another season with an 85th-minute equaliser at home to Oldham Athletic the day after his first child was born.

At the end of the 2010–11 season, he and six other Yeovil players were told they would be re-signed.

=== Carlisle United ===
On 1 June 2011, Welsh became Greg Abbott's first signing of the summer when he joined Carlisle United on a two-year deal. On 27 May 2013, Welsh was not offered a new contract and would no longer be a Carlisle United player after the end of the 2012/13 season.

=== Scunthorpe United ===
On 24 June 2013, Andy Welsh become Scunthorpe United's 5th signing of the summer where he has signed a one-year deal for the League Two club with an option of a further year. After playing all games up to the start of October, Welsh required knee surgery which ruled him out until February 2014. At the end of the season he decided to pursue the remainder of his degree in psychology and coaching.

=== Non-League ===
On 12 September 2014, Andy Welsh signed for United of Manchester. In December 2014, Welsh made the move to Farsley Celtic, closer to his home in Bradford.

== Managerial career ==
In September 2017, Andy Welsh became player/head coach at Ossett Albion. Welsh led a team that was struggling (second bottom in the league on seven points at Christmas) on an unbeaten run, finishing safely in the league.

He then took over at the newly merged club Ossett United, finishing fourth in the League (making the playoffs) with the league's best defensive record. The club also enjoyed cup success against Guiseley, a team two divisions higher.

On 29 July 2020, Welsh was selected from 750 applicants to become the first manager of Bury AFC, but the first season was ended prematurely due to the COVID-19 pandemic. Bury were crowned champions of the NWCFL Division One North in the club's second season. Welsh led Bury to the title; the side finished 11 points clear, winning 27 out of 36 games, boasting the highest goals total and best defensive record in the division.

On 5 June 2023, upon the merger of Bury FC and Bury AFC, the two team's histories were combined — retroactively counting Bury AFC's seasons as seasons for Bury FC and also retroactively counting Welsh as Bury manager since 2020. On 17 September 2023, after a run of form that saw two wins in eight games, Bury parted company with Welsh.

Welsh was appointed Guiseley manager in October 2023.

Welsh departed on April 2, 2024.

== Career statistics ==
Appearances and goals by club, season and competition
Club	Season	League			National Cup		League Cup		Other		Total	
Club	Season	Division	Apps	Goals	Apps	Goals	Apps	Goals	Apps	Goals	Apps	Goals
Stockport County	2001–02	First Division	15	0	1	0	0	0	—		16	0
Stockport County	2002–03	Second Division	13	2	0	0	0	0	1 (Note: Appearance(s) in Football League Trophy)	0	14	2
Stockport County	2003–04	Second Division	34	1	1	0	2	0	3	0	40	1
Stockport County	2004–05	League One	13	0	0	0	1	0	1	0	15	0
Stockport County	Total		75	3	2	0	3	0	5	0	85	3
Macclesfield Town (loan)	2002–03	Third Division	6	2	—		—		—		6	2
Sunderland	2004–05	Championship	7	1	1	1	0	0	—		8	2
Sunderland	2005–06	Premier League	14	0	1	0	2	0	—		17	0
Sunderland	2006–07	Championship	0	0	0	0	0	0	—		0	0
Sunderland	Total		21	1	2	1	2	0	—		25	2
Leicester City (loan)	2005–06	Championship	10	1	—		—		—		10	1
Leicester City (loan)	2006–07	Championship	7	0	0	0	1	0	—		8	0
Leicester City (loan)	Total		17	1	0	0	1	0	—		18	1
Toronto	2007	MLS	20	1	—		—		—		20	1
Blackpool	2007–08	Championship	21	0	1	0	2	0	—		24	0
Yeovil Town	2008–09	League One	37	0	1	0	0	0	0	0	38	0
Yeovil Town	2009–10	League One	42	2	1	0	1	0	1	0	45	2
Yeovil Town	2010–11	League One	34	4	2	0	0	0	1	1	37	5
Yeovil Town	Total		113	6	4	0	1	0	2	1	120	7
Carlisle United	2011–12	League One	21	0	0	0	2	0	1	0	24	0
Carlisle United	2012–13	League One	12	0	2	0	0	0	0	0	14	0
Carlisle United	Total		33	0	2	0	2	0	1	0	38	0
Scunthorpe United	2013–14	League Two	4	0	0	0	1	0	1	0	6	0
Career total			310	14	11	1	12	0	9	1	342	16

== Managerial statistics ==
As of match played 16 September 2023

Managerial record by team and tenure
Team	From	To	Record				
Team	From	To	P	W	D^{2}	L	Win %
Bury^{1}	29 July 2020	17 September 2023	115	73	25	17	63.5
Total			115	73	25	17	63.5

^{1}Upon the merger of Bury FC and Bury AFC, the two team's histories were combined — retroactively counting Bury AFC's seasons as seasons for Bury FC
^{2}Two cup matches drawn; one won on penalties and one lost. Score at 90 minutes counted as drawn game.
