= Jonathan Obika =

English footballer (born 1990)

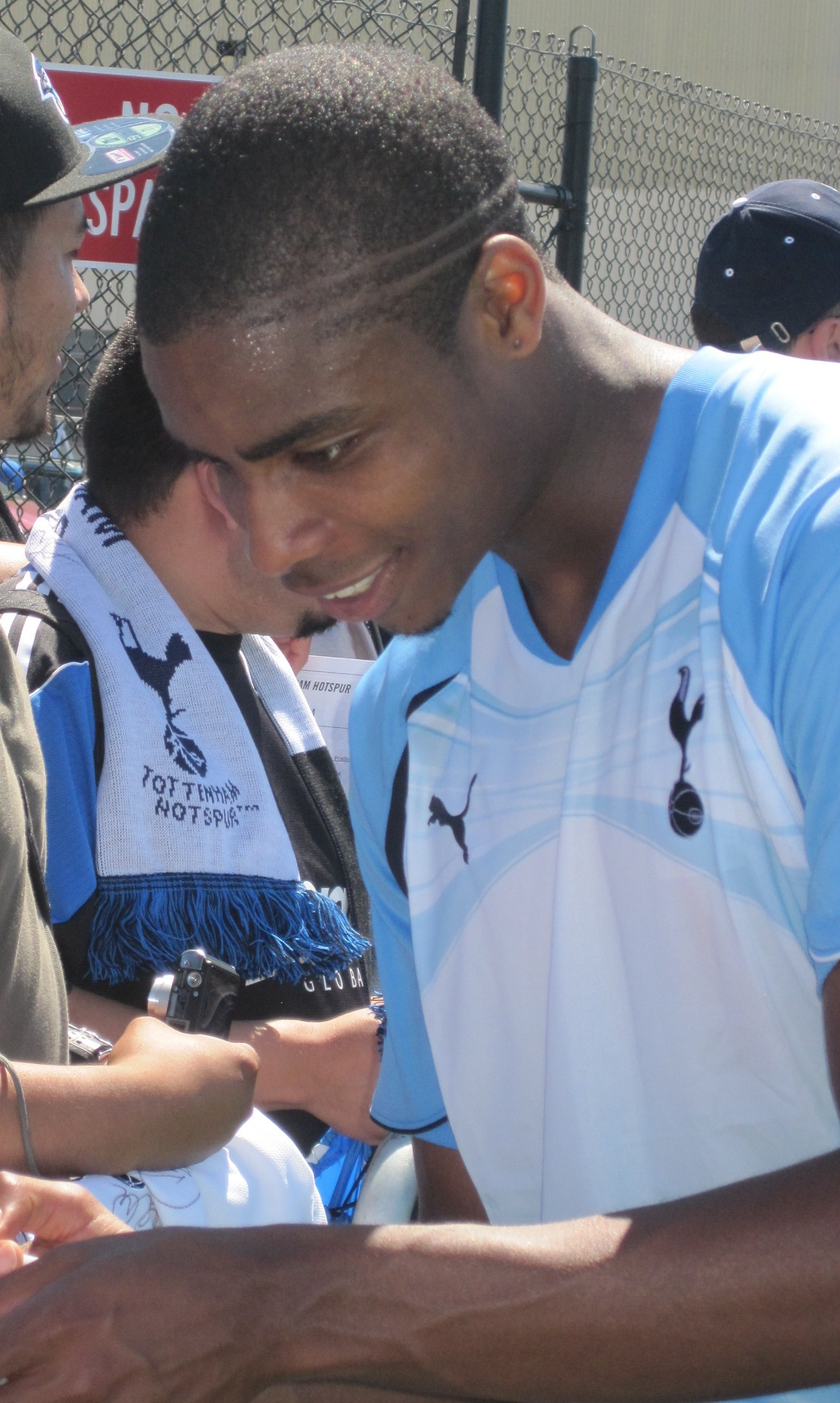
- Obika with Tottenham Hotspur in 2010

Personal information
- Full name: Jonathan Chiedozie Obika
- Date of birth: 12 September 1990 (age 36)
- Place of birth: Enfield, England
- Height: 1.83 m (6 ft 0 in)
- Position: Striker

Team information
- Current team: Motherwell (first team coach)

Youth career
- 2006–2008: Tottenham Hotspur

Senior career*
Years	Team	Apps	(Gls)
2008–2014	Tottenham Hotspur	0	(0)
2009	→ Yeovil Town (loan)	10	(4)
2009–2010	→ Yeovil Town (loan)	22	(6)
2010	→ Millwall (loan)	12	(2)
2010–2011	→ Crystal Palace (loan)	7	(0)
2011	→ Peterborough United (loan)	1	(1)
2011	→ Swindon Town (loan)	5	(0)
2011	→ Yeovil Town (loan)	11	(3)
2011–2012	→ Yeovil Town (loan)	27	(4)
2013	→ Charlton Athletic (loan)	10	(3)
2014	→ Brighton & Hove Albion (loan)	5	(0)
2014	→ Charlton Athletic (loan)	12	(0)
2014–2017	Swindon Town	94	(25)
2017–2019	Oxford United	46	(6)
2019–2021	St Mirren	64	(13)
2021–2023	Morecambe	18	(2)
2023	→ Motherwell (loan)	9	(1)
2023–2024	Motherwell	10	(1)
Total		363	(71)

International career
2008–2009	England U19	1	(0)
2009	England U20	2	(0)
- * Club domestic league appearances and goals

Jonathan Chiedozie Obika (born 12 September 1990) is an English former professional footballer who played as a striker and is currently first team coach for Scottish Premiership club Motherwell.

== Club career ==
=== Tottenham ===
Obika is a product of the Tottenham Hotspur youth system and was the top scorer for the academy side in the 2007–08 season. He made his first team debut in the UEFA Cup on 27 November 2008 against NEC Nijmegen. He also played against Ukrainian side FC Shakhtar Donetsk in the same competition. He signed a more secure contract with the club in January 2009.

On 19 March 2009 he signed with League One team Yeovil Town on a month's loan. His loan was extended until the end of the 2008–09 season in April. In his two-month loan spell he played 10 games scoring four goals.

Obika returned to Yeovil on a three-month loan on 11 August 2009. He scored in his third game of the 2009–10 season against Leyton Orient. He scored again on 1 September against Bournemouth in the Football League Trophy, coming on as a substitute at half time. Along with fellow Tottenham loanees Steven Caulker and Ryan Mason, his loan was extended until the end of the season on 5 November.

On 11 February, Obika was sent back to Spurs due to the return to Yeovil of Arron Davies and was then immediately sent on loan to fellow League One side Millwall. On 13 April, Obika scored an injury time equaliser for Millwall against Yeovil and despite what it meant to Millwall's promotion push, he didn't celebrate as a mark of respect for his old club.

On 20 August, Obika returned to south London to join Crystal Palace on a season-long loan deal. However this was cut short in early January after a series of disappointing performances, and he went on loan to Peterborough United instead. He then joined Swindon Town a few weeks later until the end of the season but was recalled after lack of opportunities at Swindon. Obika then subsequently rejoined Yeovil until the end of the season, his third club of the 2010–11 season, and made 11 appearances scoring 3 goals.

Obika then rejoined Yeovil on loan at the start of the 2011–12 season until January 2012, this deal was later extended until the end of the season. On 26 December 2011, Obika scored the first goal of his new loan deal against Charlton Athletic with an overhead kick, and he then went on to score against Carlisle, Sheffield Wednesday and Leyton Orient.

In February 2013, Obika signed on loan with Championship side Charlton Athletic for the remainder of the 2012–13 season and also signed a one-year contract extension with Spurs until 2014. Obika scored his first goal for Charlton against Leeds United, a stoppage time header to win the match 2–1. Obika followed this up with a 90th-minute winner against Wolves.

On 8 January 2014, Obika joined Championship club Brighton & Hove Albion on an initial three-month loan deal. He scored his first goal for Brighton in the FA Cup 4th round tie against Port Vale in the 78th minute, Brighton won 3–1. Rohan Ince & Solomon March scored the other two goals for the Albion. After his deal with Brighton expired, Obika rejoined Charlton Athletic on loan, for the remainder of the season.

=== Swindon Town ===
Obika left Tottenham and joined League One club Swindon Town on 1 September 2014 for an undisclosed fee. He signed a deal to keep him at The County Ground for two years. On 15 June 2017, Obika confirmed that he would be leaving Swindon upon the expiry of his current deal after a three-year spell at the County Ground.

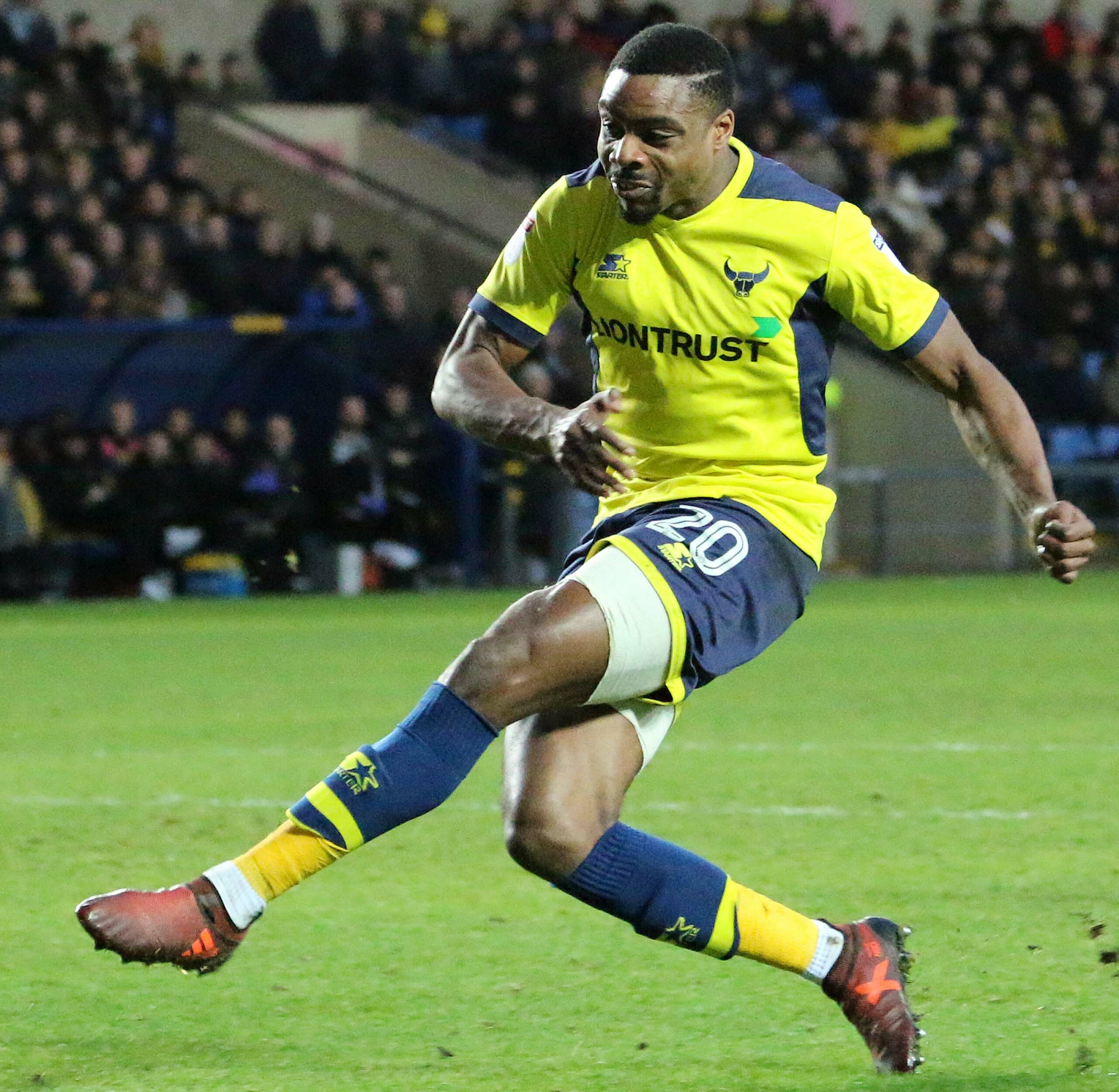
Obika with Oxford United in 2018

=== Oxford United ===
Obika became new manager Pep Clotet's first signing at Swindon's rivals Oxford United when his two-year deal was announced on 5 July 2017. He made his debut as a substitute against Oldham Athletic in the opening match of the 2017–18 season, which ended in a 2–0 away victory for Oxford, and made his home debut and first starting appearance, and scored his first goal, in the following game, a 4–3 defeat to Cheltenham Town in the first round of the EFL Cup. He was released after his contract expired after the 2018–19 season.

=== St Mirren ===
In August 2019, Obika signed a two-year deal with Scottish Premiership side St Mirren. He scored 8 goals in the league, the last of which came in a 1–0 win over Hearts which relegated the Edinburgh club.

=== Morecambe ===
In June 2021, Obika signed a two-year deal with League One side Morecambe.

=== Motherwell ===
At the end of January 2023, Obika joined Scottish Premiership club Motherwell on loan until the end of the season.

On 19 June 2023, Motherwell announced the permanent signing of Obika to a one-year contract with the option of a further year.

== International career ==
Obika was called up to represent England in the Under 20 World Cup tournament hosted in Egypt from 24 September – 16 October 2009. Obika featured in the first two games against Ghana and Uruguay.

== Coaching career ==
On 1 June 2024, a day after announcing his retirement from playing, Obika was announced as first team coach of Motherwell FC.

Obika cited Motherwell manager Stuart Kettlewell as a "big part" of his decision to call time on his playing career and focus on coaching. "I just feel this is where I'm supposed to be," said Obika. "When reflecting back, I just knew this opportunity doesn't come around often under people you value and respect. I feel honoured. "When he [Kettlewell] first came in, just watching how he took over and across the 18 months seeing him work, he is someone you want to deliver for. I feel in this role I can deliver for him."

== Personal life ==
Obika was born in Enfield, London and grew up in Tottenham. He attended The Bishop Stopford's School in Enfield. He is of Nigerian descent and is the cousin of singer and former Fame Academy contestant Lemar.

== Career statistics ==
Appearances and goals by club, season and competition
Club	Season	League			National cup (Note: Includes FA Cup and Scottish Cup)		League cup (Note: Includes Football League Cup and Scottish League Cup)		Continental		Other		Total	
Club	Season	Division	Apps	Goals	Apps	Goals	Apps	Goals	Apps	Goals	Apps	Goals	Apps	Goals
Tottenham Hotspur	2008–09	Premier League	0	0	0	0	0	0	2 (Note: Appearance(s) in UEFA Cup)	0	—		2	0
Tottenham Hotspur	2009–10	Premier League	0	0	0	0	0	0	—		—		0	0
Tottenham Hotspur	2010–11	Premier League	0	0	0	0	0	0	0	0	—		0	0
Tottenham Hotspur	2011–12	Premier League	0	0	0	0	0	0	0	0	—		0	0
Tottenham Hotspur	2012–13	Premier League	0	0	1	0	1	0	0	0	—		2	0
Tottenham Hotspur	2013–14	Premier League	0	0	0	0	0	0	0	0	—		0	0
Tottenham Hotspur	Total		0	0	1	0	1	0	2	0	—		4	0
Yeovil Town (loan)	2008–09	League One	10	4	—		—		—		—		10	4
Yeovil Town (loan)	2009–10	League One	22	6	1	0	1	0	—		1 (Note: Appearance(s) in Football League Trophy)	1	25	7
Millwall (loan)	2009–10	League One	12	2	—		—		—		0	0	12	2
Crystal Palace (loan)	2010–11	Championship	7	0	0	0	1	0	—		—		8	0
Peterborough United (loan)	2010–11	League One	1	1	1	0	—		—		—		2	1
Swindon Town (loan)	2010–11	League One	5	0	—		—		—		—		5	0
Yeovil Town (loan)	2010–11	League One	11	3	—		—		—		—		11	3
Yeovil Town (loan)	2011–12	League One	27	4	0	0	1	0	—		0	0	28	4
Charlton Athletic (loan)	2012–13	Championship	10	3	—		—		—		—		10	3
Brighton & Hove Albion (loan)	2013–14	Championship	5	0	3	1	—		—		—		8	1
Charlton Athletic (loan)	2013–14	Championship	12	0	—		—		—		—		12	0
Swindon Town	2014–15	League One	32	8	1	0	0	0	—		4 (Note: One appearance, one goal in Football League Trophy; Three appearances, one goal in League One play-offs)	2	37	10
Swindon Town	2015–16	League One	32	11	1	0	1	1	—		1	0	35	12
Swindon Town	2016–17	League One	30	6	0	0	0	0	—		1	0	31	6
Swindon Town	Total		94	25	2	0	1	1	—		6	2	103	28
Oxford United	2017–18	League One	35	5	0	0	1	1	—		5	1	41	7
Oxford United	2018–19	League One	11	1	0	0	3	0	—		2	0	16	1
Oxford United	Total		46	6	0	0	4	1	—		7	1	57	8
St Mirren	2019–20	Scottish Premiership	30	8	4	4	0	0	—		—		34	12
St Mirren	2020–21	Scottish Premiership	34	5	2	0	7	3	—		—		43	8
St Mirren	Total		64	13	6	4	7	3	—		—		77	20
Morecambe	2021–22	League One	12	2	1	0	0	0	—		—		13	2
Morecambe	2022–23	League One	6	0	0	0	1	0	—		1	0	8	0
Morecambe	Total		18	2	1	0	1	0	—		1	0	21	2
Motherwell (loan)	2022–23	Scottish Premiership	9	1	1	0	—		—		—		10	1
Motherwell	2023–24	Scottish Premiership	10	1	1	0	3	2	—		—		14	3
Career total			363	71	17	5	20	7	2	0	15	4	417	87

== Honours ==
Millwall

- Football League One play-offs: 2010
