= Nathan Jones (Welsh footballer) =

Welsh footballer and manager (born 1973)

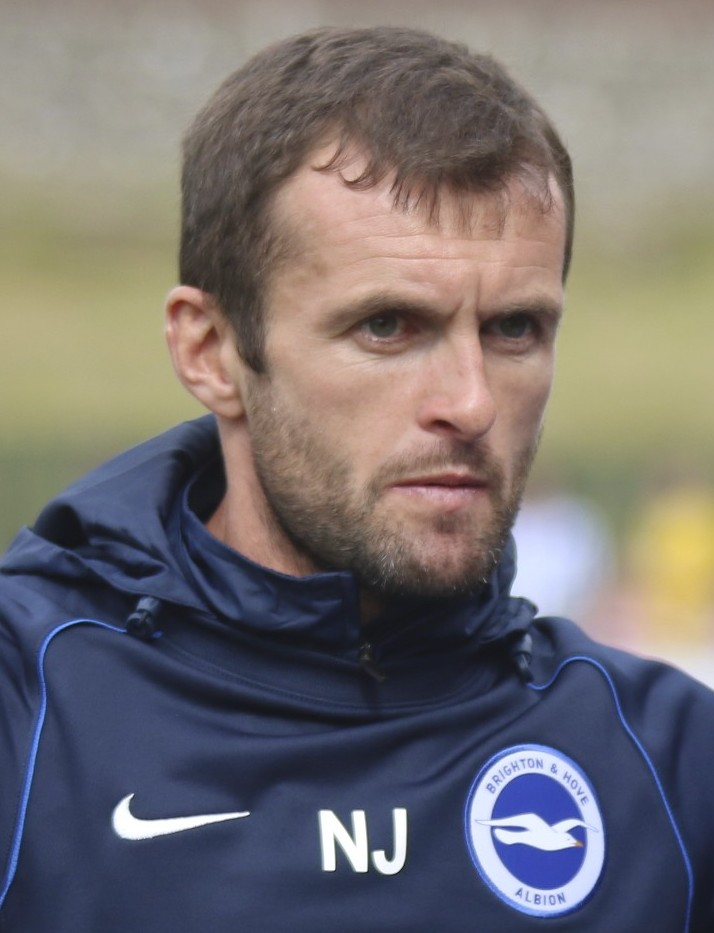
- Jones with Brighton & Hove Albion in 2014

Personal information
- Full name: Nathan Jason Jones
- Date of birth: 28 May 1973 (age 53)
- Place of birth: Blaenrhondda, Wales
- Height: 5 ft 7 in (1.70 m)
- Positions: Left-back; midfielder

Team information
- Current team: Charlton Athletic (manager)

Youth career
- 1990–1991: Cardiff City

Senior career*
Years	Team	Apps	(Gls)
1991–1992	Maesteg Park		
1992–1993	Ton Pentre		
1993–1995	Merthyr Tydfil		
1995	Luton Town	0	(0)
1995–1996	Badajoz	21	(1)
1996–1997	Numancia	16	(0)
1997–2000	Southend United	99	(2)
1999	→ Scarborough (loan)	8	(0)
2000–2005	Brighton & Hove Albion	159	(7)
2005–2012	Yeovil Town	185	(2)
Total		488	(12)

Managerial career
- 2014: Brighton & Hove Albion (caretaker)
- 2016–2019: Luton Town
- 2019: Stoke City
- 2020–2022: Luton Town
- 2022–2023: Southampton
- 2024–: Charlton Athletic
- * Club domestic league appearances and goals

Nathan Jason Jones (born 28 May 1973) is a Welsh professional football manager who is the manager of EFL Championship club Charlton Athletic. He is also a former player who played as a left-back and a midfielder.

Jones began his career with Football Conference club Merthyr Tydfil before joining Luton Town in the summer of 1995. He became homesick at Luton so took an opportunity to move to Spain with Badajoz and then Numancia and returned to England with Southend United in 1997. Jones spent three seasons at Roots Hall which included a brief loan spell with Scarborough in 1999. He moved on to Brighton & Hove Albion in 2000 and was part of the team that won three promotions in five years. He joined Yeovil Town in 2005 where he spent seven seasons in League One making over 200 appearances.

Whilst at Yeovil, Jones began taking his coaching badges, spending time as first-team coach of Yeovil Town Ladies and later player-assistant manager of the first team. He left Yeovil in 2012 and joined Charlton Athletic as their under-21 professional development coach, a role which he held for one season. He returned to Brighton as a member of the coaching staff to Óscar García, Sami Hyypiä and Chris Hughton. Jones left Brighton in January 2016 to take over as manager of League Two club Luton Town. He guided Luton to the League Two play-offs in 2016–17 losing out to Blackpool, but earned promotion to League One in 2017–18, finishing in second place.

With Luton on course for a second consecutive promotion, Jones left in January 2019 for Championship club Stoke City. His time at Stoke was ultimately unsuccessful, with him being dismissed in November 2019. Jones returned to Luton in May 2020, subsequently saving the club from relegation following the restart of the season after the UK's COVID-19 lockdown, and guiding them to a playoff place in the 2021–22 season. In November 2022, he left Luton for a second time and joined Premier League club Southampton, but lasted just three months in the role before he was dismissed. Jones was appointed manager of Charlton Athletic in February 2024, and led the club to promotion to the Championship via the League One play-offs, defeating Leyton Orient in the final at Wembley in May 2025.

== Playing career ==
=== Early career ===
Jones was born in Blaenrhondda, a small mining village in the Rhondda Valley, and began his career with the youth team at local club Cardiff City.

Jones was released by Cardiff in the summer of 1991 and went to play for Maesteg Park, Ton Pentre and Football Conference club Merthyr Tydfil. He spent two years at Penydarren Park before signing for David Pleat's Luton Town in July 1995 for a fee of £10,000. However he soon became homesick at Luton and so moved to Spain to join Segunda División club Badajoz who were managed by Englishman Colin Addison. The team narrowly missed out on promotion to La Liga in 1995–96, missing out to Extremadura by one goal. Jones dropped down to the Segunda División B in 1996–97 joining Numancia and helped them gain promotion via the play-offs. Jones credits his time in Spain as a major impact on his life and career.

=== Southend United ===
Jones returned to England play for Southend United in 1997. He spent three seasons at Southend, including a loan at Scarborough in the 1998–99 season, where he was part of the team relegated by Jimmy Glass' memorable goal for Carlisle United.

=== Brighton & Hove Albion ===
He moved to Brighton & Hove Albion where he made over 150 appearances during his five seasons at the club, achieving three promotions.

=== Yeovil Town ===
Jones moved to Yeovil Town in 2005 and established himself as a member of the first team. His seven-year association with the club included captaining the team at Wembley Stadium for the 2007 Football League One play-off final, resulting in a 2–0 defeat to Blackpool.

Jones started his FA Level Three Coaching Badge in the summer of 2008, and became first-team coach of Yeovil Town Ladies from November 2007, alongside manager Steve Phelps and assistant manager Nigel Wolfe.

On 18 February 2009, Jones was confirmed as player-assistant manager of Yeovil, alongside player-manager Terry Skiverton. Following Skiverton's replacement by Gary Johnson, Jones was demoted to the role of first-team coach.

On 1 June 2012, Jones left Yeovil Town by mutual consent after seven years and having played 211 matches for the club.

== Coaching career ==
=== Early career ===
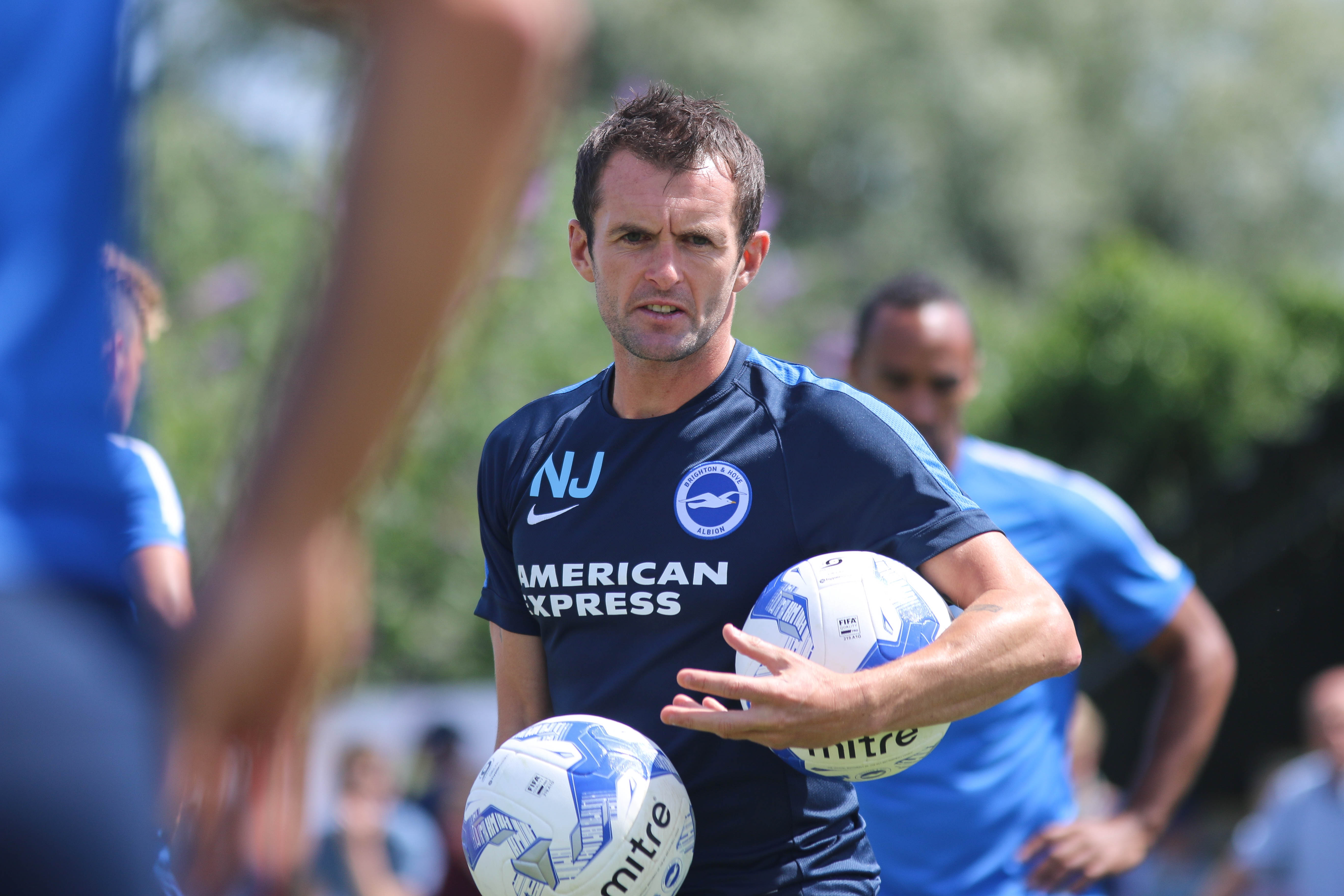
Jones with Brighton & Hove Albion in 2015

On 27 June 2012, Jones joined Championship club Charlton Athletic as their under-21 professional development coach.

On 19 July 2013, Jones joined Championship club Brighton & Hove Albion, filling the new position of assistant head coach, working under head coach Óscar García. Following Oscar's departure from Brighton and the appointment of new manager Sami Hyypiä, Jones changed roles and became Brighton's first-team coach. After Hyypia's resignation on 22 December 2014, Jones was appointed as caretaker manager. Following Chris Hughton's appointment as manager on 31 December 2014, Jones moved back to his role as assistant manager. On 3 February 2015, after the appointment of Colin Calderwood as Hughton's assistant manager, Jones was demoted to the role of first-team coach.

=== Luton Town ===
On 6 January 2016, Jones left his role as first-team coach with Brighton to become the new manager of League Two club Luton Town on a two-and-a-half-year contract. He won 11 of his 21 matches in charge during the remainder of 2015–16, guiding the club away from the danger of relegation to an 11th-place finish.

Jones made wholesale changes to Luton's squad ahead of 2016–17, releasing 12 players and signing eight new ones. Jones' Luton team spent only one week of the season outside the top seven positions, while he also led the club to the semi-final of the EFL Trophy. He signed a new three-and-a-half-year contract with the club on 20 March 2017. Luton finished the 2016–17 season in fourth place, but were beaten 6–5 on aggregate by Blackpool in the play-off semi-final, meaning they would compete the 2017–18 season in League Two again.

Jones stated his ambition to go one step further and win promotion to League One in 2017–18, saying: "This year we can't have excuses, can't have that naivety about us, can't allow teams to nick draws and cost us our ultimate goal." His summer recruitment was focused on signing experienced players who had previously won promotion, and he succeeded in doing this when signing Alan McCormack, James Collins and Marek Štěch. Luton began the season with an 8–2 home win over Yeovil Town to set a club record for their biggest margin of victory on the opening day of a season. Jones was named the League Two Manager of the Month for October 2017 after Luton recorded three wins, one draw and one defeat, including a 7–1 home victory over Stevenage. He would go on to win the award for the second successive month, in which Luton achieved three wins in four league matches, including a 7–0 home win over Cambridge United, scoring 14 goals to climb to the top of the table on goal difference. Luton's win over Cambridge meant they became the first team in the history of the English Football League to score seven or more goals on three occasions before Christmas. They were also the highest-scoring team in the country in early December with 63 goals in all competitions, one more than Manchester City who were top of the Premier League. Jones was nominated for League Two Manager of the Month for the third month in succession, which was awarded to Danny Cowley of Lincoln City. Luton topped the table until a 2–1 home defeat to Accrington Stanley in March 2018 saw them drop to second place for the first time since 21 November 2017, behind Accrington. The club did, however, win promotion to League One on 21 April 2018 after a 10-year absence following a 1–1 draw away to Carlisle United. A week later, they secured a second-place finish in the table with a 3–1 home victory over Forest Green Rovers. After four wins and one draw in April, Jones was named the League Two Manager of the Month for the third time in 2017–18.

Jones continued to take Luton on an upward trajectory during the 2018–19 season, leading the club to second place in League One by January 2019 with the highest number of goals scored. Following the dismissal of Gary Rowett, he was linked to the vacant managerial job at Championship club Stoke City in January 2019. On 9 January the club announced they had granted Jones permission to speak with Stoke City. His departure was announced later the same day and he left Luton with the highest Football League points per game ratio of any manager in their history.

=== Stoke City ===
Jones was appointed manager of Championship club Stoke City on 9 January 2019 after the club agreed a compensation package with Luton. Jones won three matches of the remaining 21 in 2018–19 as Stoke ended in 16th position. During the summer transfer window Jones brought in ten new players to build his own squad. Stoke made a poor start to the 2019–20 season, gaining only a point from the first six matches. Jones was dismissed on 1 November 2019 after winning just two of the first 14 matches of the 2019–20 season. Despite his dismissal, Jones later stated that he did not regret leaving Luton to manage Stoke.

=== Return to Luton Town ===
On 28 May 2020, Jones was reappointed as Luton Town manager, almost 18 months after originally leaving the club to manage Stoke. He replaced the outgoing Graeme Jones, who left by mutual consent the month before. In his first press conference, Jones spoke of his "regret" and "remorse" over the way he initially left the club and that he understood the mixed fan reaction to his exit and return, with hopes that he could earn fans' trust back. Jones went on to successfully guide Luton to Championship safety on the final day of the season with a 19th place finish, despite the club lying in 23rd when Jones re-joined. In the following season, Jones achieved a 12th place finish after scoring 62 points – Luton's highest points total in the second tier since the 1981–82 season.

In January 2022, Jones signed a new contract with Luton until 2027. Results continued to improve under Jones, with him leading the club to finish 6th and qualify for the playoffs at the end of the season. Though the club ultimately lost 2–1 on aggregate to Huddersfield Town in the semi-final, Jones was widely praised for his management and was named the 2021–22 EFL Championship Manager of the Season at the league's annual awards ceremony.

=== Southampton ===
On 10 November 2022, Jones was appointed manager of Premier League club Southampton, succeeding Ralph Hasenhüttl, and signed a three-and-a-half-year contract with the club. He lost his first game as Southampton manager to Liverpool on 12 November 2022. On 20 December 2022, Jones secured his first competitive victory in Southampton's 2–1 win against Lincoln City in the EFL Cup. On 14 January 2023, Jones secured his first Premier League victory in a 2–1 victory against Everton. On 12 February 2023, following a 2–1 defeat against Wolverhampton, Jones was dismissed by Southampton. Jones left the club with just one league win in eight matches, leaving Southampton bottom of the league. He was the shortest serving non-caretaker manager in Southampton's history.

=== Charlton Athletic ===
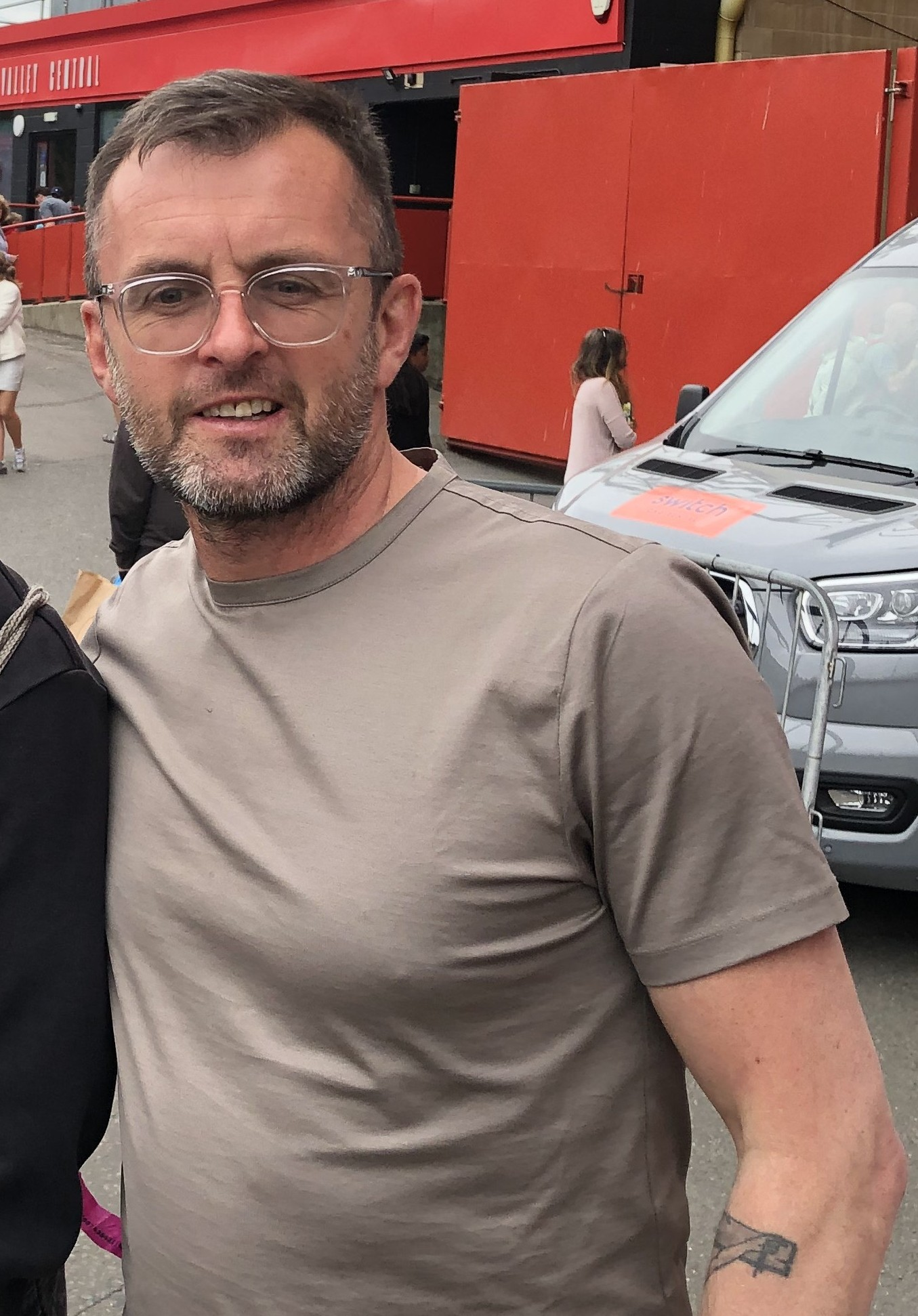
Jones with Charlton Athletic in 2025

On 4 February 2024, Jones was appointed manager of League One club Charlton Athletic. In his first interview, Jones stated that 'there is a real appetite to build something here which I am really looking forward to being a part of'. In his first game as manager, Charlton lost 2–0 at relegation rivals Reading on 10 February, then drew their next three games, including a goalless draw against league leaders Portsmouth on 24 February which saw the club match its record streak of 18 games without a victory. Following which, Charlton went on a 14 match unbeaten run, almost equalling the club's record of 15.

On 25 May 2025, Jones led Charlton to promotion, defeating Leyton Orient 1–0 in the 2025 play-off final. Following promotion, Jones was linked with the vacant managerial position at Cardiff City, before signing a new five-year deal on 6 June 2025.

== Personal life ==
Jones is a devout Christian who credits his faith with getting him through difficult times. He has several religious tattoos on his body including Praying Hands and the crucifixion on his left biceps and forearm, Jesus Christ on his right biceps, and Michaelangelo's The Creation of Adam across his back. Jones does not hide his faith and is very open to mentioning it during press conferences, occasionally appending 'God willing' to his hope that his tactics work.

Jones is bilingual, being able to speak both English and Spanish.

== Career statistics ==
Appearances and goals by club, season and competition
Club	Season	League			National cup (Note: Includes FA Cup)		League cup (Note: Includes Football League Cup)		Other		Total	
Club	Season	Division	Apps	Goals	Apps	Goals	Apps	Goals	Apps	Goals	Apps	Goals
Badajoz	1995–96	Segunda División	21	1	0	0	–		–		21	1
Numancia	1996–97	Segunda División B	16	0	0	0	–		2 (Note: Appearances in Segunda División B play-offs)	0	18	0
Southend United	1997–98	Second Division	38	0	4	1	2	0	1 (Note: Appearance(s) in Football League Trophy)	0	45	1
Southend United	1998–99	Third Division	18	0	1	0	2	0	1	0	22	0
Southend United	1999–2000	Third Division	43	2	1	0	2	0	1	0	47	2
Southend United	Total		99	2	6	1	6	0	3	0	114	3
Scarborough (loan)	1998–99	Third Division	8	0	0	0	0	0	0	0	8	0
Brighton & Hove Albion	2000–01	Third Division	40	4	2	0	2	1	1	0	45	5
Brighton & Hove Albion	2001–02	Second Division	36	2	3	0	2	0	2	0	43	2
Brighton & Hove Albion	2002–03	First Division	28	1	1	0	1	0	—		30	1
Brighton & Hove Albion	2003–04	Second Division	36	0	1	0	2	0	6 (Note: Three appearances in Second Division play-offs, three in Football League Trophy)	0	45	0
Brighton & Hove Albion	2004–05	Championship	19	0	1	0	0	0	—		20	0
Brighton & Hove Albion	Total		159	7	8	0	7	1	9	0	183	7
Yeovil Town	2005–06	League One	42	0	3	0	2	0	1	0	48	0
Yeovil Town	2006–07	League One	42	1	1	0	1	0	3 (Note: Appearances in League One play-offs)	0	47	1
Yeovil Town	2007–08	League One	31	1	1	0	1	0	3	0	36	1
Yeovil Town	2008–09	League One	23	0	2	0	1	0	1	0	27	0
Yeovil Town	2009–10	League One	17	0	1	0	1	0	0	0	19	0
Yeovil Town	2010–11	League One	8	0	2	0	1	0	0	0	11	0
Yeovil Town	2011–12	League One	22	0	0	0	1	0	0	0	23	0
Yeovil Town	Total		185	2	10	0	8	0	8	0	211	2
Career total			488	12	24	1	21	1	22	0	555	14

== Managerial statistics ==
As of match played 21 November 2026

Managerial record by team and tenure
Team	From	To	Record					Ref.
Team	From	To	P	W	D	L	Win %	Ref.
Brighton & Hove Albion (caretaker)	22 December 2014	31 December 2014	2	1	1	0	50.0	
Luton Town	6 January 2016	9 January 2019	170	87	46	37	51.2	
Stoke City	9 January 2019	1 November 2019	38	6	15	17	15.8	
Luton Town	28 May 2020	10 November 2022	133	54	37	42	40.6	
Southampton	10 November 2022	12 February 2023	14	5	0	9	35.7	
Charlton Athletic	4 February 2024	Present	140	55	40	45	39.3	
Total			497	208	139	150	41.9	

== Honours ==
=== As a player ===
Brighton & Hove Albion

- Football League Third Division: 2000–01
- Football League Second Division: 2001–02
- Football League Second Division play-offs: 2004

=== As a manager ===
Luton Town

- EFL League Two second-place promotion: 2017–18

Charlton Athletic

- EFL League One play-offs: 2025

Individual

- EFL League One Manager of the Month: December 2018
- EFL League Two Manager of the Month: October 2017, November 2017, April 2018
- EFL Championship Manager of the Season: 2021–22
