= Danny Maguire =

English footballer

Personal information
- Full name: Danny Maguire
- Date of birth: 9 September 1989 (age 37)
- Place of birth: Southwark, England
- Height: 6 ft 0 in (1.83 m)
- Position: Midfielder

Youth career
- 1997–2008: Queens Park Rangers

Senior career*
Years	Team	Apps	(Gls)
2008–2009	Queens Park Rangers	0	(0)
2008	→ AFC Wimbledon (loan)	0	(0)
2009	→ Yeovil Town (loan)	1	(0)
- * Club domestic league appearances and goals as of 19:54, 19 July 2009 (UTC)

Danny Maguire (born 9 September 1989) is an English footballer who plays as a midfielder. He started his career with Queens Park Rangers, joining AFC Wimbledon on work experience in 2008 and Yeovil Town on loan in 2009.

== Career ==
=== Club career ===
Maguire started his career as a youth team player with Queens Park Rangers (QPR) since the age of eight, signing a professional contract at the end of the 2007–08 season. In April 2008, he joined AFC Wimbledon on work experience with Romone Rose, making one appearance in their Isthmian League 2007–08 playoff semi-final against AFC Hornchurch.

He signed for Yeovil Town on loan in March 2009. He made his Football League debut on 18 April 2009, against Hartlepool United in the 3–2 home defeat in League One. Maguire was released from QPR in May 2009, along with four other players.
