= Gary Roberts (footballer, born 1987) =

English footballer, born 1987

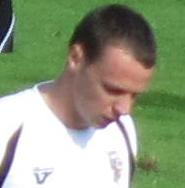
- Roberts as a Port Vale player (September 2010).

Personal information
- Full name: Gary Steven Roberts
- Date of birth: 2 February 1987 (age 39)
- Place of birth: Chester, England
- Height: 5 ft 8 in (1.73 m)
- Position: Defensive midfielder

Youth career
- 1997–2003: Crewe Alexandra

Senior career*
Years	Team	Apps	(Gls)
2003–2009	Crewe Alexandra	122	(11)
2008	→ Yeovil Town (loan)	17	(1)
2009	Yeovil Town	13	(1)
2009–2010	Rotherham United	13	(3)
2010–2011	Port Vale	46	(6)
2012–2013	Mansfield Town	27	(3)
2013	→ Floriana (loan)	13	(2)
2013	Floriana	7	(0)
2014–2015	Gap Connah's Quay	23	(0)
2015	Mosta	9	(2)
2015	Witton Albion	12	(1)
2016–2017	Bangor City	26	(6)
2017	Southport	14	(4)
2018–2020	Chester	70	(6)
2020–2021	Blacon Youth	3	(0)
2021–2022	Congleton Town	21	(1)
2022	Runcorn Town	6	(1)
2022–2023	Flint Mountain	12	(6)
2023–2025	Waggon & Horses	8	(7)
2025	Corwen	2	(0)
Total		463	(61)

International career
2002–2003	England U16	6	(0)
2004	England U17	6	(0)
2005	England U18	1	(0)
2005–2006	England U19	7	(1)
- * Club domestic league appearances and goals

Gary Steven Roberts (born 2 February 1987) is an English former professional footballer who played as a deep-lying playmaker. He was praised for his vision and ball distribution skills. However, off the field, he struggled to control drink and gambling problems. He scored 68 goals in 538 league and cup appearances in a 20-year career.

He started his career with Crewe Alexandra in 2003 and made 133 league and cup appearances over the next five years. In 2008, he had a loan spell at Yeovil Town before he joined the club permanently the following year. He signed with Rotherham United in November 2009, having impressed on trial, before he was released in summer 2010. Crewe, Yeovil and Rotherham cited disciplinary problems as their reason for letting him go. He joined Port Vale in July 2010, having been handed a 'last chance' by manager Micky Adams. His contract was terminated in December 2011, again due to a disciplinary issue, and he signed with Mansfield Town. In January 2013, he joined Maltese club Floriana on loan. He spent a short period out of the game before he joined Welsh Premier League side Gap Connah's Quay in January 2014. He returned to Malta with Mosta in January 2015, coming back to England later in the year to play for Witton Albion. He joined Welsh club Bangor City in June 2016 and then switched to Southport in July 2017. He joined his hometown club Chester six months later, where he spent close to three seasons before joining Congleton Town in July 2021. He switched to Runcorn Town in February 2022 and joined Welsh club Flint Mountain four months later.

In addition to his domestic career, he has also represented England at under-16, under-17, under-18 and under-19 levels.

== Club career ==
=== Crewe Alexandra ===
Roberts signed as a professional with Dario Gradi's Crewe Alexandra in 2004, on his 17th birthday, a few months after making his First Division debut for the club in a 3–1 win over Burnley on 26 December 2003. He later made a second appearance for the club against Wimbledon. He played a key part in the club's FA Youth Cup team which reached the semi-finals in 2004. However, he missed much of the 2004–05 season with a serious knee injury, only returning to first-team action for games against Sheffield United and West Ham United in March 2005.

Roberts established himself in the Crewe first-team in the 2005–06 season, making 33 Championship appearances and scoring two goals – against Millwall and Hull City. At the end of the season, the club were relegated into League One. However, Roberts was still given a new three-year contract, tying himself to the club until 2009.

Roberts became a key player in Crewe's bid for promotion in the 2006–07 season, playing mostly as a midfielder. He made 19 appearances during the season, scoring three goals – against Swansea City, Nottingham Forest and Yeovil Town. The first two goals came from the penalty spot, as he built his reputation as a solid penalty taker. He also received the first red card of his professional career in October 2006, in a defeat at Bristol City. He was dismissed for violent conduct after a challenge on Louis Carey. However, the Bristol City website reported the referee's decision as 'harsh' and 'strange'. That red card was the only sending off, and subsequent suspension, of the season for Crewe, as the club was awarded the 'Bobby Moore Fair Play award for outstanding conduct and discipline throughout the season'.

He scored the opening two goals of the 2007–08 season, in a 2–1 win over Brighton at the Alexandra Stadium. This led to him being named on the League One 'Team of the Week'. In 2007–08 his club once again had the best disciplinary record in the Football League. Once again Roberts received the only Crewe suspension and red card of the season, when he was given a second yellow card in a heavy defeat to Doncaster Rovers. He received four yellow cards in the season, all for unsporting behaviour. His disciplinary problems off the pitch also first began to come to light, as he was left out of the squad for the March 2008 match with Nottingham Forest due to a "training ground incident". In June 2008 Roberts was placed on the transfer list by Crewe. Cardiff City were rumoured to be interested in signing Roberts, a fee of £150,000 was mentioned, but a transfer never materialised. Instead, he trained alone all summer before being given another chance by Crewe boss Steve Holland. However, he failed to turn up at the club for pre-season training.

=== Yeovil Town ===
Roberts joined Yeovil Town on loan, initially for four months, in August 2008. After impressing during his loan spell at Huish Park, Roberts completed a permanent transfer to Yeovil for a nominal fee on 31 October 2008, with the deal officially going through on 1 January 2009. Roberts played 34 games for Yeovil during the 2008–09 season, scoring two goals. In his final game for Yeovil against Cheltenham Town he was sent off. His girlfriend left him in May 2009. Roberts was forced to move back in with his parents in Chester. On 5 August 2009, Roberts was suspended by Yeovil Town for a breach of club discipline and was released by mutual consent after reported drink and gambling problems, the final straw coming when he "turned up at a club-organised family fun day with the stench of alcohol on his breath". He later admitted his heart was not at the club, and that being alone in a hotel room away from his girlfriend and young son made it easier for him to turn to alcohol.

=== Rotherham United ===
After he admitted to suffering from drink and gambling addictions, he visited the Sporting Chance Clinic, determined to turn his life around. After his rehabilitation, he was originally offered a trial with League One side Brighton & Hove Albion, where he scored two goals in two reserve team games against Brentford and Leyton Orient. He left without an offer of a contract. Still, he was offered another trial with League Two side Rotherham United, where he played in a reserves victory over Huddersfield Town. On 12 November, Roberts was offered a contract with the "Millers". Manager Ronnie Moore commented: "He's only 22 but has real talent... people say he comes with baggage but his attitude has been first class. I think he deserves a second chance." Later in the month Roberts signed a one-month contract. The following month the option to extend Roberts' Rotherham deal until the end of the 2009–10 season was taken. In his fifth appearance for Rotherham, a 4–2 win over Yorkshire rivals Bradford City, he scored his first goal for the club in 'sensational' fashion by finding the net with a free kick from 50 yards (46 m) out. However, in April 2010 it was announced he had been sacked from Rotherham for breaking club discipline rules several times. The club did not divulge what the final breach was; though the "bitterly disappointed" manager said that while the player was "full of remorse" his teammates would not be "too sorry to see him go".

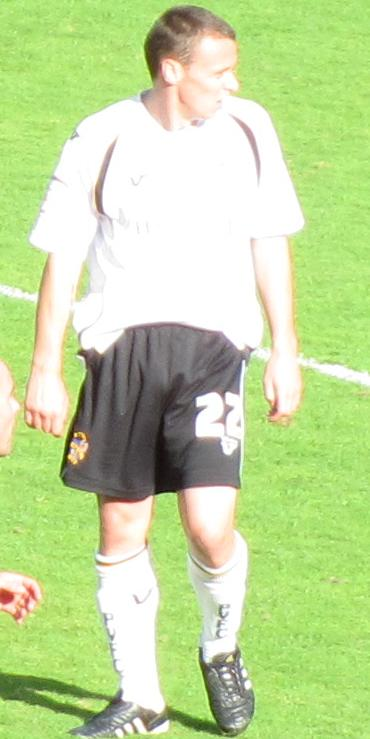
Roberts at Vale Park in September 2010, just after scoring his first goal for Port Vale against Aldershot Town.

=== Port Vale ===
He received interest from Micky Adams' Port Vale, and joined the club on trial in July 2010. Acknowledging "it's a last-chance saloon", Roberts said "I've learnt just not to be a plonker for all my life." He joined the team on their July pre-season trip to Ireland, as Adams, already convinced of the player's talents, wanted to test Roberts' ability to stay away from his off-the-field demons. Roberts seemed to enjoy a good start to his Vale career, and after Adams' typically relentless pre-season fitness regime he claimed "I've turned the corner...I think I've got my act together but I've just got to keep living each day as it comes and as long as I wake up clean that's all that I need". He signed a six-month contract at the end of the month. He started the season well, maintaining discipline off the pitch, and his first-team place on it, forging a midfield partnership with Anthony Griffith. As early as September he entered negotiations with the club to extend his contract, and Roberts quickly signed an extended contract to keep him at the club until the end of the season. However, Micky Adams left the club in December 2010, and Roberts did not enjoy a happy relationship with new manager Jim Gannon. Gannon dropped him to the bench after Roberts admitted he did not enjoy playing in a more advanced position; Vale fans showed their support for the player by chanting his name throughout a 1–0 win over Rotherham. He then picked up a three-match ban after receiving a red card for violent conduct in a reserve match against Nottingham Forest. Gannon defended Roberts, believing the player was unlucky to be dismissed after he responded to a 'reckless' challenge by David Morgan by shoving Morgan to the ground. In March, speculation that he would leave Vale Park at the end of the season (or earlier) increased, as it was reported by BBC Radio Stoke that the club had informed the player he could leave on loan. However, Gannon denied this on the club's website, stating that there was "no substance" to the report. In fact he went on to say "he has a huge part to play" in the club's promotion campaign. His teammates also showed their support for him by celebrating goals with Roberts' celebration style during his absence; club captain Marc Richards also dedicated his two goals against Shrewsbury Town to Roberts. Gannon's reign was quickly terminated, but Roberts still struggled to regain his form under caretaker manager Mark Grew.

He signed a new one-year deal with Vale in July 2011, after Micky Adams returned to the club as manager. After scoring five goals in his first nine games he admitted that "He [Adams] is the only manager that can control me so I think he gets the best out of me." However, on 19 September he was given a 14-day suspension by the club for 'a serious breach of club discipline', after he missed a day of training without any warning and then 'reported in unfit to carry out his duties' the following day; Adams said "I'm bitterly disappointed in him." He was also placed on the transfer list, as Adams stated "he's got a lot to do" before Roberts could think about a return to the first-team. He made his return on 24 October, when Adams named him on the bench for a league clash with Bristol Rovers.

"It is something we'll have a look at ... but the slate can never be wiped clean. It's like me catching my wife having an affair, isn't it? I might forgive her, but it will still be in the back of my mind. And if she does it again, then that's the end because we're getting divorced. Gary's in the same situation in that if he commits one more misdemeanour we'll sack him."

— In October 2011, Micky Adams confirmed that though he had forgiven Roberts, the player remained transfer listed.

Limited to a further two starts and two substitute appearances, on 28 December the club confirmed that Roberts was under investigation for what it described as a "serious breach of club discipline". Earlier in the day he had turned up to training again "in an unfit state to train", in what Micky Adams hinted was an attempt to force through a move to Mansfield Town. Two days later his contract was terminated with immediate effect.

=== Mansfield Town ===
Roberts signed an 18-month contract with Conference National club Mansfield Town on 1 January 2012. He made his debut on the same day, in a 2–2 draw at York City. He scored his first goals for the "Stags" on 28 January, in a 3–0 win over Ebbsfleet United at Stonebridge Road; after the game manager Paul Cox admitted that Roberts was too good a player for the Conference. Mansfield finished in third place at the end of the season, and qualified for the play-offs, losing to York City at the semi-final stage.

He played seven games at the start of the 2012–13 season but was then sidelined with an ankle injury in September. After his recovery he disappointed in three league games and was dropped from the first-team, with manager Paul Cox saying that Roberts would have to show "hunger and desire" to win back his place. However, he was sent off in a "humiliating" FA Trophy first round defeat to Matlock Town. In January 2013, he joined Maltese Premier League side Floriana on loan until the end of the season. The "Greens" finished in the relegation grouping at the end of the 2012–13 season, but led the group after ten matches and remained in the top-flight. Roberts made 14 appearances for the club and scored two goals in a 2–1 win over Rabat Ajax. In May 2013, Mansfield announced that they would not be offering Roberts a new contract in the summer.

=== Later career ===
In January 2014, Roberts joined Welsh Premier League side Gap Connah's Quay. The "Nomads" finished tenth in 2013–14. He signed with Maltese Premier League side Mosta in January 2015. He returned to England later in the year to play for Witton Albion in the Northern Premier League Division One North, and left the club upon the expiry of his contract on 31 December having scored one goal in 16 games. In June 2016, Roberts returned to the Welsh Premier League to play for Bangor City. He signed a contract extension four months later. The "Citizens" finished in fourth-place in 2016–17, and qualified for the UEFA Europa League after beating Cardiff Metropolitan University 1–0 in the play-off final; Roberts said "It means everything to the club [to be back in Europe]. We've worked hard as a unit, not just the players but all the staff". He left the club in July 2017 after having his contract cancelled.

Roberts signed with National League North club Southport in July 2017, who were managed by former Floriana boss Alan Lewer. He scored four goals in 14 matches for the "Sandgrounders", before his contract was cancelled by mutual consent in December 2017. On 9 January 2018, he signed a short-term contract with his hometown club, Chester, who were playing in the National League. Mark Maguire, CEO of the "Seals", said that: "What happens next will be largely down to Gary and will either be seen as a stroke of genius or madness. It certainly won't be boring!". Roberts was sent off ten minutes into his debut in an FA Trophy loss at East Thurrock United, leaving him with a three-game suspension, though the club's Community Trust and Exiles supporters group stepped in to fund his wages for another month after the expiry of his initial contract. Chester were relegated at the end of the 2017–18 season, though Roberts said that departing manager Marcus Bignot was "one of the best, if not the best manager I've worked under". Roberts scored four goals in 34 National League North appearances in the 2018–19 season. He had aimed to help the club reach the play-offs after signing a one-year contract at the start of the campaign, though they ended up finishing two places and three points short of this target.

He signed a new one-year deal with Chester in June 2019 after completing a training regime with the club's strength and conditioning coach set by joint-managers Anthony Johnson and Bernard Morley. Roberts said that "They know I'm a madman, but it's managing that madman." He scored two goals in 25 appearances in the 2019–20 season, which was permanently suspended on 26 March due to the COVID-19 pandemic in England, with Chester in the play-offs in seventh place. He featured just twice in the 2020–21 season, which was also curtailed early due to the ongoing pandemic. His departure at the end of his contract was confirmed in December 2020.

On 21 July 2021, Roberts joined North West Counties Premier Division side Congleton Town, linking up with former Port Vale teammates Richard Duffy and Tom Pope, the former of which was now managing Congleton. He was sent off during a 2–1 home defeat to Avro on 14 September. He was also sent off in a 4–1 home win over Runcorn Town on 18 December after being shown two yellow cards. On 1 February 2022, he signed with Runcorn Town. Town were relegated at the end of the 2021–22 season.

In June 2022, Roberts joined with Flint Mountain of the Welsh Ardal Leagues. The club finished fourth in the 2022–23 season. He scored six goals in seven games for Waggon & Horses of the Chester & Wirral Football League in the 2023–24 season.

For the 2025–26 season he joined Welsh tier 3 club Corwen.

== International career ==
Roberts has played for England at under-16, under-17, under-18, and under-19 levels.

He was in the England squad for the 2004 UEFA European Under-17 Championship. He played in all the matches, as England topped their group with a 2–0 win over Ukraine, a 3–1 win over Portugal, and a 1–0 victory over Austria. The team were eliminated at the semi-final stage by a Cesc Fàbregas penalty for Spain. He was sent off in the Third Place play-off against Portugal, as the team went on to lose in a penalty shoot-out.

He captained England under-18s in a goalless draw with Norway at Vale Park on 10 June 2005.

On 20 May 2006, Roberts scored the winning goal as the England under-19s beat Northern Ireland under-19s 2–1 in a UEFA European Under-19 Championship elite qualification game in Belgium. He also played in the 2–1 defeat to Belgium, and 1–0 loss to Serbia and Montenegro; as England finished a disappointing last place in their group, failing to qualify for the tournament.

== Style of play ==
"Gary stands out because he's got that range of passing, vision and still has that edge on the tackling side. He needs somebody around him who can maybe do the uglier things..."

— Port Vale's Anthony Griffith speaking of his midfield partner in July 2010.

His manager at Rotherham, Ronnie Moore, also stated that Roberts has "talent and his passing ability is absolutely brilliant". The Crewe Alexandra website described him as "a combative, all action midfield player who also has a keen eye for a goal". However, he has poor discipline, and has picked up many bookings over the course of his career.

== Personal life ==
Roberts has a son, born around 2005 and a daughter, born around 2013. He was born and raised in an area of Chester he describes as "one of the roughest council estates in the country"; he still resides there as of 2011.

Roberts has attended the Sporting Chance Clinic for treatment of the drink and gambling problems which have dogged and severely damaged his football career; speaking of it all, Roberts has said "I really can't believe what's happened to me. What's happened to my life." He has put his addiction problems down to "boredom". He also said that "I'm not one of these people who can have one drink and stop. I want another and another and another." His drink problems began after he developed a gambling habit in 2007. His addiction to betting on horse racing cost him £3,000 a month and left him asking friends and family for money.

== Career statistics ==
Appearances and goals by club, season and competition
Club	Season	League			National cup (Note: Includes FA Cup, Maltese FA Trophy, Welsh Cup)		League cup (Note: Includes Football League Cup, Welsh League Cup)		Other		Total	
Club	Season	Division	Apps	Goals	Apps	Goals	Apps	Goals	Apps	Goals	Apps	Goals
Crewe Alexandra	2003–04	First Division	2	0	0	0	0	0	0	0	2	0
Crewe Alexandra	2004–05	Championship	2	0	0	0	0	0	0	0	2	0
Crewe Alexandra	2005–06	Championship	33	2	1	0	0	0	0	0	34	2
Crewe Alexandra	2006–07	League One	43	3	1	0	1	0	5 (Note: Appearance(s) in Football League Trophy)	0	50	3
Crewe Alexandra	2007–08	League One	42	6	2	0	1	0	0	0	45	6
Crewe Alexandra	Total		122	11	4	0	2	0	5	0	133	11
Yeovil Town	2008–09	League One	30	2	2	0	1	0	1	0	34	2
Rotherham United	2009–10	League Two	13	3	2	0	0	0	0	0	15	3
Port Vale	2010–11	League Two	35	2	4	0	2	0	2	0	43	2
Port Vale	2011–12	League Two	11	4	2	0	1	1	1	0	15	5
Port Vale	Total		46	6	6	0	3	1	3	0	58	7
Mansfield Town	2011–12	Conference Premier	17	3	—		—		2 (Note: Appearance(s) in Conference Premier play-offs)	0	19	3
Mansfield Town	2012–13	Conference National	10	0	1	0	—		1 (Note: Appearance(s) in FA Trophy)	0	12	0
Mansfield Town	Total		27	3	1	0	—		3	0	31	3
Floriana (loan)	2012–13	Maltese Premier League	13	2	1	0	—		0	0	14	2
Floriana	2013–14	Maltese Premier League	7	0	0	0	—		0	0	7	0
Floriana	Total		20	2	1	0	0	0	0	0	21	2
Gap Connah's Quay	2013–14	Welsh Premier League	10	0	0	0	0	0	0	0	10	0
Gap Connah's Quay	2014–15	Welsh Premier League	13	0	0	0	0	0	0	0	13	0
Gap Connah's Quay	Total		23	0	0	0	0	0	0	0	23	0
Mosta	2014–15	Maltese Premier League	9	2	2	3	—		1 (Note: Appearance(s) in Maltese Premier League play-off)	1	12	6
Witton Albion	2015–16	NPL Premier Division	12	1	2	0	—		2	0	16	1
Bangor City	2016–17	Welsh Premier League	26	6	1	0	1	0	2 (Note: Appearance(s) in Welsh Premier League UEFA Europa League play-offs)	1	30	7
Bangor City	2017–18	Welsh Premier League	0	0	0	0	0	0	1 (Note: Appearance(s) in UEFA Europa League)	0	1	0
Bangor City	Total		26	6	1	0	1	0	3	1	31	7
Southport	2017–18	National League North	14	4	0	0	—		0	0	14	4
Chester	2017–18	National League	12	0	0	0	—		1	0	13	0
Chester	2018–19	National League North	34	4	2	0	—		4 (Note: Two appearances in FA Trophy, two appearances and one goal in Cheshire Senior Cup)	1	40	5
Chester	2019–20	National League North	22	2	1	0	—		4 (Note: Three appearances in FA Trophy, one appearance in Cheshire Senior Cup)	0	27	2
Chester	2020–21	National League North	2	0	2	0	—		0	0	4	0
Chester	Total		70	6	5	0	—		9	1	84	7
Blacon Youth Club	2020–21	Cheshire Football League Two	3	0	—		0	0	0	0	3	0
Congleton Town	2021–22	NWCFL Premier Division	21	1	1	0	0	0	4 (Note: Three appearances in FA Vase, one appearance in Cheshire Senior Cup)	0	26	1
Runcorn Town	2021–22	NWCFL Premier Division	6	1	—		1	0	0	0	7	1
Flint Mountain	2022–23	Ardal NW	12	6	4	0	1	0	3 (Note: Two appearances in NEWFA Challenge Cup, one appearance in FAW Trophy)	1	20	7
Waggon & Horses	2023–24	CWFL Premier Division	6	6	—		1	0	0	0	7	6
Waggon & Horses	2024–25	CWFL Premier Division	2	1	—		0	0	0	0	2	1
Waggon & Horses	Total		8	7	—		1	0	0	0	9	7
Career total			462	61	31	3	10	1	34	4	537	69
