= Andre McCollin =

English footballer (born 1985)

Personal information
- Full name: Andre Stefan McCollin
- Date of birth: 26 March 1985 (age 41)
- Place of birth: Lambeth, England
- Height: 1.70 m (5 ft 7 in)
- Position: Striker

Senior career*
Years	Team	Apps	(Gls)
2006–2007	Corinthian-Casuals	30	(30)
2007–2008	Fisher Athletic	30	(19)
2008–2010	Yeovil Town	13	(1)
2008	→ Grays Athletic (loan)	3	(0)
2009	→ Dorchester Town (loan)	4	(1)
2010	→ Farnborough (loan)	7	(2)
2010	Farnborough	2	(0)
2010–2011	Croydon Athletic		
2011–2012	Tooting & Mitcham United		
2012–2014	Kingstonian	108	(59)
2014–2015	Aldershot Town	27	(4)
2015–2016	Cray Wanderers	18	(14)
2016	Kingstonian	19	(12)
2016–2017	Tonbridge Angels	33	(10)
2017	Merstham	7	(2)
2017–2018	Kingstonian	15	(4)
2018	Haringey Borough	7	(3)
2018	Harlow Town	3	(1)
2018–2019	Burgess Hill	18	(2)
2019	Whyteleafe	12	(3)
2019	Three Bridges	11	(2)
2019–2020	Ware	15	(3)
- * Club domestic league appearances and goals as of 23:32, 5 March 2024 (UTC)

Andre Stefan McCollin (born 26 March 1985) is an English footballer who last played for Ware.

== Career ==
Born in Lambeth, London, McCollin spent one season with Fisher Athletic joining from Corinthian Casuals, where he scored 19 goals in 2006–07. McCollin made his Football League debut coming off the bench for Yeovil Town against Hereford United in August 2008.

McCollin signed for Grays Athletic on loan in November 2008. He made his debut in the 1–1 FA Cup first round draw with Carlisle United on 8 November 2008.

McCollin signed on loan for Dorchester Town in October 2009. He made his debut and in the process scored a goal in the 3–1 loss to Dover Athletic on 31 October 2009.

On 12 February 2010, McCollin joined Farnborough on loan.

He was released along with three other players on 13 May 2010 by Yeovil, and then returned to Farnborough on a non-contract basis before leaving again after only two substitute appearances.

He joined his home-town side Croydon Athletic in August 2010, coming on as substitute on 28 August, in the 65th minute, before being carried off injured after 15 minutes.

As of 20 August 2012, McCollin was playing for Kingstonian. He signed for Aldershot Town in October 2014.

He started the 2015–16 season with Cray Wanderers and made an immediate impact, scoring five goals in his first four games; moving back to Kingstonian mid-season, he continued his rich vein of form, scoring twelve league goals in 19 appearances. He joined Tonbridge Angels for the start of the 2016–17 season, scoring after 25 minutes on his debut against Wingate & Finchley, but suffered a broken fibula ten minutes later. Upon his return in February 2017, he scored a last-minute penalty in a 4–1 win over Grays Athletic.

McCollin joined Merstham in November 2017, making his debut for the club in a 1–0 defeat at Lowestoft Town on 11 November and scoring his first goals in a 2–2 draw with Billericay Town three weeks later. He made seven league appearances in total for Merstham. In December 2017, he returned for a third spell at Kingstonian, where he made fifteen appearances in the Isthmian League Premier Division, scoring four goals, but he departed again in March 2018 for Haringey Borough, where he saw out the 2017–18 season with seven league appearances, scoring in each of his first three games for the club. At the end of the season, Haringey played in the Isthmian League Division One North play-off final; McCollin started the match, playing the first 85 minutes as his team beat Canvey Island 3–1 to earn promotion to the Premier Division.

At the start of the 2018–19 season, McCollin joined Harlow Town, scoring on his debut against Whitehawk on 11 August, but made only two further appearances for the club before moving to Burgess Hill Town, where he made eighteen league appearances, scoring two goals.

On 19 January 2019, McCollin signed with Whyteleafe FC. He moved to Three Bridges for the 2019–20 season, then to Ware in December 2019.
