= 2014–15 Doncaster Rovers F.C. season =

Doncaster Rovers
2014–15 season
- Chairman: David Blunt
- Manager: Paul Dickov
- Stadium: Keepmoat Stadium
- League One: 13th
- FA Cup: Third round (vs. Bristol City)
- Football League Cup: Third round (vs. Fulham)
- Football League Trophy: Area quarter-finals (vs. Notts County)
- Top goalscorer: League: Nathan Tyson (8); All: Curtis Main; Nathan Tyson (9 each)
- Highest home attendance: 11,037 vs Sheffield United (League One, 15 Nov 14)
- Lowest home attendance: 5,197 vs Crawley Town (League One, 16 Sep 14)
- Average home league attendance: 6803.5
Home colours	Away colours

The 2014–15 season was Doncaster Rovers' 136th season in their existence, 12th consecutive season in the Football League and first season in League One following relegation the previous season. Along with League One, the club also competed in the FA Cup, League Cup and JP Trophy. The season covered the period from 1 July 2014 to 30 June 2015.

== Squad ==
=== Detailed overview ===
Caps and goals up to the start of season 2014–15.

No.	Name	Position (s)	Nationality	Place of birth	Date of birth (age)	Club caps	Club goals	Int. caps	Int. goals	Signed from	Date signed	Fee	Contract End
Goalkeepers
13	Marko Maroši	GK	(Slovakia)		23 October 1993 (age 33)	–	–	–	–	Wigan Athletic	7 August 2014	Free	30 June 2016
40	Jack McLaren	GK	(Northern Ireland)	Derry		–	–	–	–	Academy		Trainee	30 June 2016
43	Stephen Bywater	GK	(England)	Oldham	7 June 1981 (age 45)	–	–	–	–	Millwall	16 January 2015	Free	30 June 2015
Defenders
3	Cedric Evina	LB	(Cameroon)		16 November 1991 (age 35)	–	–	–	–	Charlton Athletic	30 July 2014	Free	30 June 2016
5	Rob Jones	CB	(England)	Stockton-on-Tees	3 November 1979 (age 47)	63	9	–	–	Sheffield Wednesday	31 July 2012	Free	
6	Jamie McCombe	CB	(England)	Pontefract	1 January 1983 (age 43)	38	1	–	–	Huddersfield Town	12 August 2012	Free	
12	Luke McCullough	CB	(Northern Ireland)	Portadown	15 February 1994 (age 32)	14	0	2	0	Manchester United	25 July 2013	Free	30 June 2017
15	Liam Wakefield	CB	(England)	Doncaster	9 April 1994 (age 32)	7	1	–	–	Academy	27 June 2012	Trainee	30 June 2015
16	Andy Butler	CB	(England)	Doncaster	4 November 1983 (age 43)	7	1	–	–	Sheffield United	6 January 2015	Undisclosed	30 June 2017
22	Reece Wabara	RB	(England)	Birmingham	28 December 1991 (age 34)	15	0	–	–	Manchester City	1 August 2014	Free	30 June 2015
24	Paul McKay	CB	(Scotland)	Glasgow	19 November 1996 (age 30)	–	–	–	–	Academy	18 August 2014	Trainee	
30	Ben Askins	CB	(England)	Middlesbrough	2 January 1996 (age 30)	–	–	–	–	Academy		Trainee	
31	Mitchell Lund	RB	(England)	Leeds	27 August 1996 (age 30)	–	–	–	–	Academy	1 July 2014	Trainee	30 June 2015
34	Scott Brown		(England)			–	–	–	–	Academy	1 July 2014	Trainee	
Midfielders
4	Dean Furman	CM	(South Africa)	Cape Town	22 June 1988 (age 38)	43	1	18	1	Oldham Athletic	12 July 2013	Free	30 June 2015
8	Abdul Razak	CM	(Ivory Coast)	Abidjan	11 November 1992 (age 34)	–	–	–	–	OFI	19 January 2015	Free	30 June 2015
10	Harry Forrester	AM/CF	(England)	Milton Keynes	2 January 1991 (age 35)	9	1	–	–	Brentford	31 July 2013	Free	30 June 2016
18	Paul Keegan	CM	(Republic of Ireland)	Dublin	5 July 1984 (age 42)	77	1	–	–	Bohemians	17 January 2011	Undisclosed	30 June 2017
19	Richie Wellens	CM	(England)	Moston, Manchester	26 March 1980 (age 46)	132	10	–	–	Leicester City	2 August 2013	Free	30 June 2015
23	Kyle Bennett	RW/LW/CF	(England)	Telford	9 September 1990 (age 36)	81	8	–	–	Bury	1 July 2011	£80,000	30 June 2015
26	James Coppinger	RW/LW	(England)	Guisborough	10 January 1981 (age 45)	384	40	–	–	Exeter City	30 June 2004	£30,000	30 June 2016
29	Harry Middleton	CM/AM	(England)	Doncaster	12 April 1995 (age 31)	1	0	–	–	Academy	13 July 2013	Trainee	
32	Billy Whitehouse	RW/LW	(England)	Doncaster	13 June 1996 (age 30)	–	–	–	–	Academy		Trainee	
35	Lewis Ferguson	RW/LW	(England)	Doncaster	1 July 1996 (age 30)	–	–	–	–	Academy		Trainee	30 June 2015
Forwards
9	Theo Robinson	CF/RW	(Jamaica)	Birmingham	22 January 1989 (age 37)	32	5	7	0	Derby County	15 August 2013	Undisclosed	30 June 2015
11	Curtis Main	CF	(England)	South Shields	20 June 1992 (age 34)	–	–	–	–	Middlesbrough	30 July 2014	Swap	30 June 2017
14	Nathan Tyson	CF	(England)	Reading	4 May 1982 (age 44)	–	–	–	–	Blackpool	28 July 2014	Free	30 June 2015
25	Alex Peterson	CF	(England)	Doncaster	17 October 1994 (age 32)	5	0	–	–	Academy	1 July 2013	Trainee	
36	Jack McKay	CF	(Scotland)	Glasgow	19 November 1996 (age 30)	–	–	–	–	Academy		Trainee	

=== Statistics ===
This includes any players featured in a match day squad in any competition.

As of 8 March 2015

No.	Pos	Nat	Player	Total		League One		FA Cup		League Cup		League Trophy	
No.	Pos	Nat	Player	Apps	Goals	Apps	Goals	Apps	Goals	Apps	Goals	Apps	Goals
3	DF	(Cameroon) CMR	Cedric Evina	19	0	12+2	0	0	0	3	0	2	0
4	MF	(South Africa) RSA	Dean Furman	28	2	21+2	2	1+1	0	3	0	0	0
5	DF	(England) ENG	Rob Jones	6	0	5	0	0	0	0+1	0	0	0
6	DF	(England) ENG	Jamie McCombe	19	1	14+1	1	0	0	1+1	0	1+1	0
7	FW	(England) ENG	Jonson Clarke-Harris (on loan from Rotherham United)	7	0	3+4	0	0	0	0	0	0	0
8	MF	(Ivory Coast) CIV	Abdul Razak	7	0	4+3	0	0	0	0	0	0	0
9	FW	(Jamaica) JAM	Theo Robinson	37	4	13+16	4	3+1	0	1+1	0	1+1	0
10	MF	(England) ENG	Harry Forrester	38	8	19+11	6	2+2	0	0+2	1	2	1
11	FW	(England) ENG	Curtis Main	33	9	15+12	7	3+1	2	1	0	1	0
12	DF	(Northern Ireland) NIR	Luke McCullough	36	1	28	0	4	1	3	0	1	0
13	GK	(Slovakia) SVK	Marko Maroši	2	0	0+1	0	1	0	0	0	0	0
14	FW	(England) ENG	Nathan Tyson	34	10	22+7	8	0+2	0	2	1	1	1
15	DF	(England) ENG	Liam Wakefield	10	1	3+3	0	0	0	3	1	1	0
16	DF	(England) ENG	Andy Butler	27	3	22	3	4	0	0	0	1	0
17	DF	(Ireland) EIR	Enda Stevens (on loan from Aston Villa)	25	1	21	1	4	0	0	0	0	0
18	MF	(Ireland) EIR	Paul Keegan	40	0	30+2	0	4	0	2+1	0	1	0
19	MF	(England) ENG	Richie Wellens	37	4	27+2	2	4	1	1+1	0	1+1	1
22	DF	(England) ENG	Reece Wabara	42	1	35	1	4	0	2	0	1	0
23	MF	(England) ENG	Kyle Bennett	39	5	22+9	5	2+2	0	3	0	1	0
24	DF	(Scotland) SCO	Paul McKay	0	0	0	0	0	0	0	0	0	0
25	FW	(England) ENG	Alex Peterson	1	0	0+1	0	0	0	0	0	0	0
26	MF	(England) ENG	James Coppinger	36	6	26+1	4	4	1	3	1	1+1	0
29	MF	(England) ENG	Harry Middleton	4	0	0+2	0	1	0	0	0	0+1	0
30	DF	(England) ENG	Ben Askins	0	0	0	0	0	0	0	0	0	0
31	DF	(England) ENG	Mitchell Lund	1	0	0	0	0	0	0	0	1	0
32	MF	(England) ENG	Billy Whitehouse	5	0	0+2	0	0+1	0	0	0	1+1	0
34	DF	(England) ENG	Scott Brown	0	0	0	0	0	0	0	0	0	0
35	MF	(England) ENG	Lewis Ferguson	0	0	0	0	0	0	0	0	0	0
36	FW	(Scotland) SCO	Jack McKay	4	0	1+3	0	0	0	0	0	0	0
40	GK	(England) ENG	Jack McClaren	0	0	0	0	0	0	0	0	0	0
43	GK	(England) ENG	Stephen Bywater	12	0	12	0	0	0	0	0	0	0
Players who left the club during the season:
1	GK	(England) ENG	Jed Steer (on loan from Aston Villa)	17	0	13	0	0	0	3	0	1	0
2	DF	(Scotland) SCO	Paul Quinn	0	0	0	0	0	0	0	0	0	0
20	FW	(England) ENG	Uche Ikpeazu (on loan from Watford)	7	0	3+4	0	0	0	0	0	0	0
21	MF	(Spain) ESP	Marc de Val	16	0	8+3	0	0+1	0	2	0	2	0
33	GK	(England) ENG	Sam Johnstone (on loan from Manchester United)	14	0	10	0	3	0	0	0	1	0

==== Goals record ====
As of 18 February 2015

Rank	No.	Po.	Name	League One	FA Cup	League Cup	League Trophy	Total
1	14	FW	Nathan Tyson	7	0	1	1	9
2	11	FW	Curtis Main	5	2	0	0	7
3	10	MF	Harry Forrester	4	0	1	1	6
3	26	MF	James Coppinger	4	1	1	0	6
5	23	MF	Kyle Bennett	5	0	0	0	5
6	9	FW	Theo Robinson	4	0	0	0	4
6	19	MF	Richie Wellens	2	1	0	1	4
8	16	DF	Andy Butler	3	0	0	0	3
9	4	MF	Dean Furman	2	0	0	0	2
10	6	DF	Jamie McCombe	1	0	0	0	1
10	12	DF	Luke McCullough	0	1	0	0	1
10	15	DF	Liam Wakefield	0	0	1	0	1
10	22	DF	Reece Wabara	1	0	0	0	1
Own Goals				0	1	0	0	1
Total				33	6	4	3	46

==== Disciplinary record ====
As of 1 November 2014

No.	Pos.	Name	League One			FA Cup			League Cup			League Trophy			Total		
No.	Pos.	Name	Yellow card	(yellow card) (yellow-red card)	Red card	Yellow card	(yellow card) (yellow-red card)	Red card	Yellow card	(yellow card) (yellow-red card)	Red card	Yellow card	(yellow card) (yellow-red card)	Red card	Yellow card	(yellow card) (yellow-red card)	Red card
3	DF	Cedric Evina	2	0	0	0	0	0	0	0	0	0	0	0	2	0	0
4	MF	Dean Furman	2	0	0	0	0	0	0	0	0	0	0	0	2	0	0
6	DF	Jamie McCombe	1	0	0	0	0	0	1	0	0	0	0	0	2	0	0
10	DF	Harry Forrester	2	1	1	0	0	0	0	0	0	0	0	0	2	1	1
14	FW	Nathan Tyson	2	0	0	0	0	0	1	0	0	0	0	0	3	0	0
16	DF	Andy Butler	1	0	0	0	0	0	0	0	0	0	0	0	1	0	0
18	MF	Paul Keegan	3	0	0	0	0	0	0	0	0	0	0	0	3	0	0
19	MF	Richie Wellens	1	0	0	0	0	0	0	0	0	0	0	0	1	0	0
21	MF	Marc de Val	0	0	0	0	0	0	2	0	0	0	0	0	2	0	0
22	DF	Reece Wabara	1	0	0	0	0	0	0	0	0	0	0	0	1	0	0
23	MF	Kyle Bennett	1	0	0	0	0	0	0	0	0	0	0	0	1	0	0
Total			16	1	1	0	0	0	4	0	0	0	0	0	20	1	1

== Transfers ==
=== In ===
No.	Pos.	Nat.	Name	Age	EU	Moving from	Type	Transfer window	Ends	Transfer fee	Source
14	FW	(England)	Nathan Tyson	32	EU	Blackpool	Free transfer	Summer	2015	Free	Doncaster Rovers F.C
3	DF	(Cameroon)	Cedric Evina	22	EU	Charlton Athletic	Free transfer	Summer	2016	Free	Doncaster Rovers F.C
11	FW	(England)	Curtis Main	22	EU	Middlesbrough	Swap deal	Summer	2017	Swap	Doncaster Rovers F.C
22	DF	(England)	Reece Wabara	22	EU	Manchester City	Free transfer	Summer	2015	Free	Doncaster Rovers F.C
13	GK	(Slovakia)	Marko Maroši	20	EU	Wigan Athletic	Free transfer	Summer	2016	Free	Doncaster Rovers F.C
16	DF	(England)	Andy Butler	31	EU	Sheffield United	Transfer	Winter	2017	Undisclosed	BBC Sport
43	GK	(England)	Stephen Bywater	33	EU	Millwall	Free transfer	Winter	2015	Free	BBC Sport
8	MF	(Ivory Coast)	Abdul Razak	22	EU	OFI (Greece)	Free transfer	Winter	2015	Free	Doncaster Rovers F.C

=== Loans in ===
No.	Pos.	Name	Country	Age	Loan club	Started	Ended	Start source	End source
1	GK	Jed Steer	(England)	21	Aston Villa	1 August 2014	31 October 2014	Doncaster Rovers F.C	Doncaster Rovers F.C
16	DF	Andy Butler	(England)	30	Sheffield United	23 October 2014	6 January 2015	BBC Sport	BBC Sport
33	GK	Sam Johnstone	(England)	21	Manchester United	27 October 2014	12 January 2015	Manchester United F.C	Doncaster Rovers F.C
17	DF	Enda Stevens	(Republic of Ireland)	24	Aston Villa	6 November 2014	30 June 2015	Doncaster Rovers F.C; Doncaster Rovers F.C	
20	FW	Uche Ikpeazu	(England)	19	Watford	28 January 2015	10 March 2015	Doncaster Rovers F.C	Watford Observer
7	FW	Jonson Clarke-Harris	(England)	20	Rotherham United	12 March 2015	30 June 2015	Doncaster Rovers F.C	

Sources: For loan start source see "Start source". For loan end source see "End source".
EU = if holds or not a European Union passport; Country: when 2 flags, 1st flag = country that plays for internationally, 2nd flag = country of birth; No. = number on jersey; P = Position (for position name, pause mouse pointer on abbreviation); Name = Name on jersey (for more extensive name, pause mouse pointer on name); In/Out = In: The player came in on loan, Out: The player went out on loan; Loan club = the club that the player moved on loan to or the club that the player came from on loan; Started = the date when the player's loan started; Ended = the date when the player's loan ended.

=== Out ===
No.	Pos.	Name	Country	Age	Type	Moving to	Transfer window	Transfer fee	Apps	Goals	Source
17	DF	Gabriel Tamaș	(Romania)	30	Free transfer	Watford	Summer	Free	14	0	BBC Sport
7	MF	Mark Duffy	(England)	28	Free transfer	Birmingham City	Summer	Free	36	2	Doncaster Rovers F.C
9	FW	Chris Brown	(England)	29	Free transfer	Blackburn Rovers	Summer	Free	87	19	Blackburn Rovers F.C
11	MF	David Cotterill	(Wales)	26	Free transfer	Birmingham City	Summer	Free	80	15	Doncaster Rovers F.C
8	FW	Billy Paynter	(England)	29	Free transfer	Carlisle United	Summer	Free	46	13	BBC Sport
13	GK	Jon Maxted	(England)	21	Released	Hartlepool United	Summer	Free	0	0	The Star; BBC Sport
1	GK	Ross Turnbull	(England)	29	Free transfer	Barnsley	Summer	Free	28	0	BBC Sport
3	DF	James Husband	(England)	20	Swap deal	Middlesbrough	Summer	Undisclosed + Swap	62	4	Doncaster Rovers F.C
20	DF	Abdoulaye Méïté	(Ivory Coast)	33	Free transfer	OFI (Greece)	Summer	Free	21	1	Le Figaro Sport24 (French)
2	DF	Paul Quinn	(Scotland)	29	Released	Ross County (Scotland)	Summer	Free	68	2	Doncaster Rovers F.C; Scottish Professional Football League
21	MF	Marc de Val	(Spain)	24	Released	Córdoba CF (Spain)	Winter	Free	16	0	Doncaster Rovers F.C; Inside Spanish Football

EU = if holds or not a European Union passport; Country: when 2 flags, 1st flag = country that plays for internationally, 2nd flag = country of birth; N = number on jersey; P = Position (for position name, pause mouse pointer on abbreviation); Name = Name on jersey (for more extensive name, pause mouse pointer on name); Age = age on the day of the signing; Moving from = only indicate the club the player was playing before start playing for this club in this season, for the type of the moving see Status column; Moving to = only indicates the club the player is going to play next, for the type of the moving see Status column; Ends = when the player's current contract ends; n/a = Not applicable; Apps = Total number of competitive appearances (including substitute appearances) at the club prior to departure; Goals = Total number of competitive goals scored at the club prior to departure.

=== Loans out ===
No.	Pos.	Name	Country	Age	Loan club	Started	Ended	Start source	End source
9	FW	Theo Robinson	(England)	26	Scunthorpe United	26 March 2015	30 June 2015	Doncaster Rovers F.C	

Sources: For loan start source see "Start source". For loan end source see "End source".
EU = if holds or not a European Union passport; Country: when 2 flags, 1st flag = country that plays for internationally, 2nd flag = country of birth; No. = number on jersey; P = Position (for position name, pause mouse pointer on abbreviation); Name = Name on jersey (for more extensive name, pause mouse pointer on name); In/Out = In: The player came in on loan, Out: The player went out on loan; Loan club = the club that the player moved on loan to or the club that the player came from on loan; Started = the date when the player's loan started; Ended = the date when the player's loan ended.

== Competitions ==
=== Pre–season friendlies ===
9 July 2014 Friendly	Bradford Park Avenue	0–2	Doncaster Rovers	Bradford
19:45 BST		Report	Robinson 62'; Black 73' (o.g.)	Stadium: Horsfall Stadium

12 July 2014 Friendly	Lincoln City	2–0	Doncaster Rovers	Lincoln
15:00 BST	Burrow 56'; Power 81'	Report		Stadium: Sincil Bank

22 July 2014 Friendly	Grimsby Town	0–4	Doncaster Rovers	Grimsby
19:00 BST		Report	Tyson 1'; Bennett 20'; Robinson 30'; Peterson 83'	Stadium: Blundell Park; Attendance: 1,168

27 July 2014 Friendly	Doncaster Rovers	2–2	Sheffield Wednesday	Doncaster
15:00 BST	de Val 50'; Bennett 65'	Report	Nuhiu 42'; Antonio 47'	Stadium: Keepmoat Stadium

2 August 2014 Friendly	Doncaster Rovers	1–2	Rotherham United	Doncaster
15:00 BST	Main 82'	Report	Derbyshire 53'; Hall 57'	Stadium: Keepmoat Stadium

=== League One ===
==== League table ====
Pos	Team	Pld	W	D	L	GF	GA	GD	Pts
11	Barnsley	46	17	11	18	62	61	+1	62
12	Gillingham	46	16	14	16	65	66	−1	62
13	Doncaster Rovers	46	16	13	17	58	62	−4	61
14	Walsall	46	14	17	15	50	54	−4	59
15	Oldham Athletic	46	14	15	17	54	67	−13	57

Updated to match(es) played on 3 May 2015. Source: BBC Sport
Rules for classification: 1) Points; 2) Goal difference; 3) Number of goals scored

==== Result by round ====
Round	1	2	3	4	5	6	7	8	9	10	11	12	13	14	15	16	17	18	19	20	21	22	23	24	25	26	27	28	29	30	31	32	33	34	35	36	37	38	39	40	41	42	43	44	45	46
Ground	A	H	H	A	H	A	A	H	H	A	A	H	A	H	H	A	H	A	A	H	A	H	A	H	A	H	H	A	H	A	H	A	H	A	A	H	H	A	A	H	A	H	A	H	A	H
Result	W	L	D	W	L	P	L	D	W	L	W	P	L	L	D	W	L																													
Position	1	10	10	9	11	P	19	18	15	18	13	P	14	17	20	17	17																													

Updated to match(es) played on 1 November. Source: BBC Sport
A = Away; H = Home; W = Win; D = Draw; L = Loss; P = Postponed

==== Matches ====
The fixtures for the 2014–15 season were announced on 18 June 2014 at 9am.

9 August 2014 1	Yeovil Town	0–3	Doncaster Rovers	Yeovil
15:00 BST	Sokolík (yellow card) 36'; Martin (yellow card) 45+3'	Report	Main 8'; Forrester (yellow card) 55', (goal) 63'; Robinson 90+7'	Stadium: Huish Park; Attendance: 5,235; Referee: Graham Horwood

16 August 2014 2	Doncaster Rovers	1–3	Port Vale	Doncaster
15:00 BST	Bennett 74'; Forrester (red card) 79'	Report	Williamson 27'; Pope 39'; Dickinson 41'	Stadium: Keepmoat Stadium; Attendance: 6,437; Referee: Geoff Eltringham

19 August 2014 3	Doncaster Rovers	1–1	Preston North End	Doncaster
19:45 BST	Tyson 90+2'	Report	Kilkenny (yellow card) 49'; Humphrey 66'; Wright (yellow card) 74'; Woods (yellow card) 90+2'	Stadium: Keepmoat Stadium; Attendance: 6,513; Referee: Gary Sutton

23 August 2014 4	Colchester United	0–1	Doncaster Rovers	Colchester
15:00 BST	Bean (yellow card) 50'; Gilbey (yellow card) 90+5'	Report	Bennett 65'	Stadium: Colchester Community Stadium; Attendance: 3,162; Referee: Gavin Ward

30 August 2014 5	Doncaster Rovers	0–2	Oldham Athletic	Doncaster
15:00 BST	Keegan (yellow card) 61'	Report	Clarke-Harris 4'; Forte 59' (pen.), (yellow card) 81'; Philliskirk (yellow card) 72'	Stadium: Keepmoat Stadium; Attendance: 6,313; Referee: Tony Harrington

Postponed 6	Barnsley	v	Doncaster Rovers	Barnsley
		Details		Stadium: Oakwell

13 September 2014 7	Bristol City	3–0	Doncaster Rovers	Bristol
15:00 BST	Wilbraham 13'; Little 30'; Agard 82'	Report	Forrester (yellow card) 10' (yellow-red card) 51'	Stadium: Ashton Gate; Attendance: 11,733; Referee: Michael Bull

16 September 2014 8	Doncaster Rovers	0–0	Crawley Town	Doncaster
19:45 BST	Bennett (yellow card) 35'	Report	Leacock (yellow card) 52'; Sadler (yellow card) 88'	Stadium: Keepmoat Stadium; Attendance: 5,197; Referee: Eddie Ilderton

20 September 2014 9	Doncaster Rovers	3–2	Chesterfield	Doncaster
15:00 BST	Tyson 7'; Bennett 32'; McCombe 50', (yellow card) 63'	Report	Clucas 42'; Raglan (yellow card) 52'; Doyle 61'	Stadium: Keepmoat Stadium; Attendance: 7,954; Referee: Tony Harrington

27 September 2014 10	Walsall	3–0	Doncaster Rovers	Walsall
15:00 BST	Baxendale 45+3'; Bradshaw 57'; Forde 64'; O'Connor (yellow card) 77'	Report	Evina (yellow card) 27'; Furman (yellow card) 76'	Stadium: Bescot Stadium; Attendance: 3,741; Referee: Scott Mathieson

4 October 2014 11	Scunthorpe United	1–2	Doncaster Rovers	Scunthorpe
15:00 BST	Sparrow (yellow card) 7'; Fallon 24'; O'Neill (yellow card) 51'; Bishop (yellow card) 65'	Report	Coppinger 29'; Tyson 49', (yellow card) 50'; Furman (yellow card) 71'	Stadium: Glanford Park; Attendance: 5,420; Referee: Seb Stockbridge

Postponed 12	Doncaster Rovers	v	Notts County	Doncaster
		Details		Stadium: Keepmoat Stadium

18 October 2014 13	Fleetwood Town	3–1	Doncaster Rovers	Fleetwood
15:00 BST	Dobbie 11'; McAlinden 37'; Schumacher (yellow card) 39'; Ball 73'; Crainey (yellow card) 75'; Southern (yellow card) 85'	Report	Tyson 17'	Stadium: Highbury Stadium; Attendance: 3,785; Referee: Steve Martin

21 October 2014 14	Doncaster Rovers	0–2	Leyton Orient	Doncaster
19:45 BST	Forrester (yellow card) 45'; Wabara (yellow card) 88'	Report	Simpson 2'; McAnuff (yellow card) 45'; Henderson 62'; Dagnall (yellow card) 85'	Stadium: Keepmoat Stadium; Attendance: 5,205; Referee: Chris Sarginson

25 October 2014 15	Doncaster Rovers	0–0	Milton Keynes Dons	Doncaster
15:00 BST	Butler (yellow card) 38'; Keegan (yellow card) 74'; Tyson (yellow card) 83'	Report	Alli (yellow card) 33'; Potter (yellow card) 42'; Flanagan (yellow card) 51'	Stadium: Keepmoat Stadium; Attendance: 5,976; Referee: Darren Handley

1 November 2014 16	Bradford City	1–2	Doncaster Rovers	Bradford
15:00 GMT	Stead 45+4'; Davies (yellow card) 88'	Report	Evina (yellow card) 23'; Wabara 59'; Wellens (yellow card) 63'; Main 69'; Keegan (yellow card) 72'	Stadium: Valley Parade; Attendance: 13,348; Referee: Kevin Wright

15 November 2014 17	Doncaster Rovers	0–1	Sheffield United	Doncaster
15:00 GMT	Keegan (yellow card) 18'; Stevens (yellow card) 23'; Main (yellow card) 37'; Forrester (yellow card) 89'	Report	Basham (yellow card) 41'; McCarthy (red card) 64'; Murphy 64'	Stadium: Keepmoat Stadium; Attendance: 11,037; Referee: Keith Hill

22 November 2014 18	Rochdale	1–3	Doncaster Rovers	Rochdale
15:00 GMT	Done 8' (red card) 54'; Lund (yellow card) 64'	Report	Bennett 25' (yellow card) 70'; Robinson 86'; Main 90'	Stadium: Spotland Stadium; Attendance: 3,229; Referee: Jeremy Simpson

29 November 2014 19	Crewe Alexandra	1–1	Doncaster Rovers	Crewe
15:00	Ikpeazu 30'; Ness (yellow card) 66'	Report	Butler (yellow card) 38'; Coppinger 80'	Stadium: Gresty Road; Attendance: 4,530; Referee: Charles Breakspear

2 December 2014 6 (Rescheduled)	Barnsley	1–1	Doncaster Rovers	Barnsley
19:45	Nyatanga 5' (yellow card) 29'	Report	Robinson 52'	Stadium: Oakwell; Attendance: 10,058; Referee: Nigel Miller

13 December 2014 20	Doncaster Rovers	1–2	Gillingham	Doncaster
15:00 GMT	Wabara (yellow card) 41'; Main 90+4' (pen.)	Report	Norris 51', 77'; Egan (yellow card) 69'; Dack (yellow card) 72'; Nelson (yellow card) 90+4'	Stadium: Keepmoat Stadium; Attendance: 5,542; Referee: Graham Salisbury

20 December 2014 21	Swindon Town	0–1	Doncaster Rovers	Swindon
15:00	Stephens (yellow card) 90+1'	Report	Robinson 26' (pen.); Bennett (yellow card) 27'; Wellens (yellow card) 60'; Furman (yellow card) 69'; Wabara (yellow card) 80'; Johnstone (yellow card) 90+5'	Stadium: County Ground; Attendance: 7,793; Referee: Kevin Johnson

26 December 2014 22	Doncaster Rovers	2–0	Coventry City	Doncaster
15:00	Butler 2'; Forrester (yellow card) 15' (goal) 22'	Report	Maddison (yellow card) 13' (yellow-red card) 76'; Barton (yellow card) 42' (yellow-red card) 74'; Pennington (yellow card) 67'; Webster (yellow card) 8'	Stadium: Keepmoat Stadium; Attendance: 6,916; Referee: Chris Kavanagh

28 December 2014 23	Peterborough United	0–0	Doncaster Rovers	Peterborough
15:00	Bostwick (yellow card) 47'	Report	de Val (yellow card) 26'; Wabara (yellow card) 57'; Keegan (yellow card) 62'	Stadium: London Road Stadium; Attendance: 6,895; Referee: Gary Sutton

10 January 2015 24	Oldham Athletic	2–2	Doncaster Rovers	Oldham
15:00	Ibehre 23'; Elokobi 54'; Mills (red card) 75'	Report	Bennett (yellow card) 24'; Tyson 78' (yellow card) 88'; Keegan (yellow card) 90+3'; Coppinger 90+5'	Stadium: Boundary Park; Attendance: 4,181; Referee: Carl Boyeson

17 January 2015 25	Doncaster Rovers	1–0	Barnsley	Doncaster
15:00	Stevens (yellow card) 35'; Forrester 84'	Report	Nyatanga (yellow card) 61'; Waring (yellow card) 71'; Berry (yellow card) 80'; Holgate (red card) 90+3'	Stadium: Keepmoat Stadium; Attendance: 9,005; Referee: Kevin Wright

20 January 2015 12 (Rescheduled)	Doncaster Rovers	0–0	Notts County	Doncaster
19:45 GMT	Keegan (yellow card) 71'	Report	White (yellow card) 55'; Thomas (yellow card) 65' (yellow-red card) 87'; Mullins (yellow card) 77'	Stadium: Keepmoat Stadium; Attendance: 5,547; Referee: Richard Clark

31 January 2015 26	Chesterfield	2–2	Doncaster Rovers	Chesterfield
15:00 GMT	O'Shea (yellow card) 32'; Doyle 43'; Morsy (yellow card) 74'; Ryan 87'	Report	Coppinger 3'; Butler 9'; Bennett (yellow card) 41'	Stadium: Proact Stadium; Attendance: 7,839; Referee: Darren Deadman

7 February 2015 27	Doncaster Rovers	0–2	Walsall	Doncaster
15:00 GMT	Keegan (yellow card) 69'; Butler (yellow card) 79'	Report	Cook 3' (yellow card) 9'; Taylor (yellow card) 68'; Hiwula-Mayifuila 70'	Stadium: Keepmoat Stadium; Attendance: 6,089; Referee: Graham Scott

10 February 2015 28	Crawley Town	0–5	Doncaster Rovers	Crawley
19:45 GMT	Edwards (yellow card) 26'; Wordsworth (yellow card) 62'; Walsh (red card) 67'	Report	Stevens (yellow card) 20'; Butler 38'; Wellens 56'; Tyson 64' (yellow card) 67'; Forrester 73'; Main 90+1'	Stadium: Broadfield Stadium; Attendance: 2,581; Referee: Lee Collins

14 February 2015 29	Doncaster Rovers	3–0	Yeovil Town	Doncaster
15:00 GMT	Tyson 22'; Furman 57'; Bennett 77'	Report	Foley (yellow card) 60'; Moore (yellow card) 74'	Stadium: Keepmoat Stadium; Attendance: 5,950; Referee: Mark Heywood

17 February 2015 30	Doncaster Rovers	2–1	Crewe Alexandra	Doncaster
19:45	Furman 62'; Wellens 90'	Report	Ray 8'; Tate (yellow card) 61'	Stadium: Keepmoat Stadium; Attendance: 6,164; Referee: Darren Sheldrake

21 February 2015 31	Port Vale	3–0	Doncaster Rovers	Burslem
15:00 GMT	Marshall 7'; Veseli 38'; Neal (yellow card) 45+1'; Inniss (yellow card) 58'; Moore 87'	Report	McCombe (yellow card) 23'; Tyson (yellow card) 58'; Furman (yellow card) 79'	Stadium: Vale Park; Attendance: 5,713; Referee: Keith Stroud

24 February 2015 32	Doncaster Rovers	1–3	Bristol City	Doncaster
19:45 GMT	Main 57'	Report	Freeman 10'; Cunningham 33' (pen.) (yellow card) 73'; Wilbraham 69' (yellow card) 70'; Little (yellow card) 72'; Fielding (yellow card) 81'; Smith (yellow card) 90+2'	Stadium: Keepmoat Stadium; Attendance: 5,495; Referee: Stuart Attwell

28 February 2015 33	Doncaster Rovers	2–0	Colchester United	Doncaster
15:00 GMT	Wabara (yellow card) 12'; Stevens 39'; Main (yellow card) 76'; Tyson 83' (pen.)	Report	Clohessy (yellow card) 9'; Gilbey (yellow card) 46'; Eastman (yellow card) 86'	Stadium: Keepmoat Stadium; Attendance: 6,330; Referee: Peter Bankes

3 March 2015 34	Preston North End	2–2	Doncaster Rovers	Preston
19:45 GMT	Johnson 13'; Garner (yellow card) 54'; Huntington (yellow card) 86'; Beckford 90+4'	Report	Forrester 81'; Main 84'	Stadium: Deepdale; Attendance: 8,703; Referee: Dean Whitestone

7 March 2015 35	Gillingham	1–1	Doncaster Rovers	Gillingham
15:00 GMT	Marquis 44'; Martin (yellow card) 66'; Norris (yellow card) 84'	Report	Forrester 40'	Stadium: Priestfield Stadium; Attendance: 5,909; Referee: Keith Hill

14 March 2015 36	Doncaster Rovers	0–2	Peterborough United	Doncaster
15:00 GMT	Stevens (yellow card) 37'	Report	James 16'; Payne (yellow card) 31'; Ntlhe (yellow card) 52'; Washington (yellow card) 53' (goal) 88'; Bostwick (yellow card) 74'	Stadium: Keepmoat Stadium; Attendance: 11,520; Referee: (England) Nigel Miller

17 March 2015 37	Doncaster Rovers	1–2	Swindon Town	Doncaster
19:45 GMT	Main 41'	Report	Smith 54' (pen.); Obika 90+1'	Stadium: Keepmoat Stadium; Attendance: 5,258; Referee: (England) Tony Harrington

21 March 2015 38	Coventry City	1–3	Doncaster Rovers	Coventry
15:00 GMT	Samuel 5'; Nouble (yellow card) 14'; O'Brien (yellow card) 38'	Report	Razak (yellow card) 17'; Wellens 50'; Clarke-Harris 72' (yellow card) 74'; Forrester 84'	Stadium: Ricoh Arena; Attendance: 8,699; Referee: (England) Carl Boyeson

3 April 2015 39	Doncaster Rovers	0–3	Bradford City	Doncaster
19:45 GMT	Forrester (yellow card) 45+2'; Furman (yellow card) 48'; Butler (yellow card) 82'	Report	MacKenzie 55'; Clarke 64'; Mcmahon 90+6'	Stadium: Keepmoat Stadium; Attendance: 8,592; Referee: (England) Graham Salisbury

7 April 2015 40	Sheffield United	3–2	Doncaster Rovers	Sheffield
19:45 GMT	Baxter 29' (pen.); Done 52'; Davies 71'	Report	Bennett 17' 59'; Wellens (yellow card) 45'	Stadium: Bramall Lane; Attendance: 20,487; Referee: (England) Scott Duncan

11 April 2015 41	Doncaster Rovers	1–1	Rochdale	Doncaster
15:00 GMT	Wabara (yellow card) 15'; Bennett 17'; Furman (yellow card) 61'	Report	Henderson 59'	Stadium: Keepmoat Stadium; Attendance: 5,695; Referee: (England) Gavin Ward

14 April 2015 42	Leyton Orient	0–1	Doncaster Rovers	London
19:45 GMT	Clarke (yellow card) 5'; Henderson (yellow card) 47'; Wright (yellow card) 50'; Bartley (yellow card) 90+1'	Report	Evina (yellow card) 28'; Bennett (yellow card) 41'; Jones (yellow card) 45+3' (goal) 56'	Stadium: Brisbane Road; Attendance: 4,410; Referee: (England) Carl Berry

18 April 2015 43	Doncaster Rovers	0–0	Fleetwood Town	Doncaster
15:00 GMT	Lund (yellow card) 52'	Report	McLaughlin (yellow card) 19'	Stadium: Keepmoat Stadium; Attendance: 6,211; Referee: (England) Tim Robinson

21 April 2015 44	Milton Keynes Dons	3–0	Doncaster Rovers	Milton Keynes
19:45 GMT	Bowditch 66'; Baker 77' 84'	Report	Evina (yellow card) 25'; Forrester (yellow card) 42'	Stadium: Stadium mk Attendance: 8,159; Referee: (England) Roger East

25 April 2015 45	Notts County	2–1	Doncaster Rovers	Nottingham
15:00 GMT	Thompson 8'; Hollis (yellow card) 46'; Noble 60'; Burke (yellow card) 64'; Bajner (yellow card) 70'	Report	Butler (yellow card) 67'; Jones (yellow card) 90+1'; Tyson 90+5' (pen.)	Stadium: Meadow Lane; Attendance: 5,857; Referee: (England) Kevin Johnson

3 May 2015 46	Doncaster Rovers	5–2	Scunthorpe United	Doncaster
12:15 GMT	Canavan 12' (o.g.)Tyson 33' 74' (pen.) 80' (pen.); Jones 45+2'; Butler (yellow card) 61'; Lund (yellow card) 62'	Report	Clarke (yellow card) 9' van Veen (yellow card) 36'; Bishop (yellow card) 51'; Butler 53' (o.g.); Canavan (yellow card) 57'; Adelakun 90+2'	Stadium: Keepmoat Stadium; Attendance: 9,394; Referee: (England) Chris Kavanagh

=== FA Cup ===
In the First Round Doncaster Rovers were drawn against Weston-super-Mare of the Conference South.

18 November 2014 First Round	Weston-super-Mare	1–4	Doncaster Rovers	Weston-super-Mare
19:45 GMT	Jordan (yellow card) 25'; Mawford (yellow card) 77'; Monelle 90+3'	Report	Main 16', 36'; Coppinger 45+1'; Wellens 64'; Bennett (yellow card) 67'; Stevens (yellow card) 83'; Wabara (yellow card) 83'	Stadium: Woodspring Stadium; Attendance: 2,949; Referee: Tim Robinson

6 December 2014 Second Round	Oldham Athletic	0–1	Doncaster Rovers	Oldham
15:00	Forte (yellow card) 84'	Report	Coppinger (yellow card) 53'; Wabara (yellow card) 81'; Kusunga 86' (o.g.)	Stadium: Boundary Park; Attendance: 3,242; Referee: Lee Collins

3 January 2015 Third Round	Doncaster Rovers	1–1	Bristol City	Doncaster
15:00	McCullough 50'	Report	Little (yellow card) 13'; Kane (yellow card) 57'; Smith 75'	Stadium: Keepmoat Stadium; Attendance: 5,671; Referee: Scott Duncan

13 January 2015 Replay	Bristol City	2–0	Doncaster Rovers	Bristol
19:45	Emmanuel-Thomas 36', 79'	Report		Stadium: Ashton Gate; Attendance: 6,951; Referee: Darren Bond

=== League Cup ===
The draw for the first round was made on 17 June 2014 at 10am. Doncaster Rovers were drawn at away to League Two side York City. For the second round they were drawn away to Championship club Watford. The draw for the third round of the cup was made following the completion of second round fixtures on 27 August 2014. The Rovers were once again drawn away, this time against Championship side Fulham. They lost this match, thus exiting the cup. However they did manage to cause Fulham trouble, with James Coppinger pulling one back on the hour mark, and were unlucky not to push into extra time with a Theo Robinson penalty being saved.

12 August 2014 First Round	York City	0–1	Doncaster Rovers	York
19:45 BST		Report	McCombe (yellow card) 36' de Val (yellow card) 58'; Forrester 90+1'	Stadium: Bootham Crescent; Attendance: 3,357; Referee: Mark Haywood

26 August 2014 Second Round	Watford	1–2	Doncaster Rovers	Watford
19:45 BST	Dyer 31'; Andrews (yellow card) 35'	Report	Tyson 12' (pen.), (yellow card) 90+1'; Wakefield 52' de Val (yellow card) 78'	Stadium: Vicarage Road; Attendance: 7,318; Referee: Andy Woolmer

23 September 2014 Third Round	Fulham	2–1	Doncaster Rovers	London
19:45 BST	Bettinelli (yellow card) 10'; Ruiz 16'; Burn 32', (yellow card) 90+6'; Bodurov (yellow card) 80'	Report	Coppinger 60'	Stadium: Craven Cottage; Attendance: 8,070; Referee: Kevin Friend

=== League Trophy ===
Doncaster Rovers received a bye into round two in the Football League Trophy (known as the Johnstone's Paint Trophy for sponsorship reasons). They were drawn away to League Two's Burton Albion in the draw for round two. In the area quarter-finals Donny were drawn against fellow League One side Notts County. This match was postponed, due to County's wish to avoid a fixture pile-up.

7 October 2014 Round Two	Burton Albion	0–3	Doncaster Rovers	Burton-upon-Trent
19:45 BST		Report	Forrester 32'; Tyson 41' (pen.); Wellens 87'	Stadium: Pirelli Stadium; Attendance: 1,269; Referee: Mark Brown

Postponed Area Quarter-Finals	Doncaster Rovers	v	Notts County	Doncaster
		Details		Stadium: Keepmoat Stadium

18 November 2014 Area Quarter-Finals (Rescheduled)	Doncaster Rovers	0–1	Notts County	Doncaster
19:30 GMT		Report	Hall (yellow card) 63'; Noble 74'; Traoré (yellow card) 83'	Stadium: Keepmoat Stadium; Attendance: 2,570; Referee: Phil Gibbs
