= Harry Middleton (footballer, born 1995) =

English footballer

Personal information
- Full name: Harry Oliver Middleton
- Date of birth: 12 April 1995 (age 31)
- Place of birth: Doncaster, England
- Height: 1.80 m (5 ft 11 in)
- Position: Midfielder

Team information
- Current team: Maltby Main

Youth career
- 2009–2012: Doncaster Rovers

Senior career*
Years	Team	Apps	(Gls)
2012–2017	Doncaster Rovers	63	(0)
2017–2018	Port Vale	6	(0)
2017	→ FC Halifax Town (loan)	5	(0)
2018	Alfreton Town	6	(0)
2018–2019	Gainsborough Trinity	19	(0)
2019–2020	Cleethorpes Town	14	(1)
2020	Grantham Town	0	(0)
2020–2022	Cleethorpes Town	31	(3)
2021	→ Barton Town (dual registration)	5	(0)
2022–2023	Belper Town	36	(5)
2023–2024	Cleethorpes Town	15	(0)
2024–2025	Rossington Main		
2025–	Maltby Main	34	(4)
- * Club domestic league appearances and goals as of 21:39, 29 April 2026 (UTC)

Harry Oliver Middleton (born 12 April 1995) is an English former professional footballer who plays as a midfielder for United Counties League Division One club Maltby Main.

Middleton began his career at Doncaster Rovers, making his first-team debut in November 2012. He established himself in the first team in the 2015–16 relegation campaign before helping Rovers to secure promotion out of League Two in 2016–17. He signed with Port Vale in August 2017 and was loaned out to FC Halifax Town three months later. He signed with Alfreton Town in August 2018 and moved on to Gainsborough Trinity three months later. He joined Cleethorpes Town in December 2019 and also had brief spells with Grantham Town and Barton Town. He became a police officer in 2022, continuing his non-League career with Belper Town, Cleethorpes Town, Rossington Main, and Maltby Main.

== Career ==
=== Doncaster Rovers ===
Middleton began his career at Doncaster Rovers and was part of the Academy team that won the Youth Alliance Cup with a 4–0 win over Exeter City at St James Park in 2012. He made his first-team debut in the Football League Trophy area quarter-final match against Crewe Alexandra at the Alexandra Stadium on 4 November 2012; Rovers drew 1–1 and lost the resulting penalty shoot-out. He was one of six youth team players to be given a one-year professional contract by the club in July 2013.

He made his second first-team appearance on 7 October 2014, in a 3–0 victory at Burton Albion in the League Trophy, coming on as an 87th-minute substitute. He made his League One debut on 28 December, coming on for Marc de Val 34 minutes into a 0–0 draw at Peterborough United. Speaking after the match, manager Paul Dickov said Middleton was close to starting a first-team game and that "he's been slightly unfortunate with the form of Paul Keegan, Richie Wellens, Marc de Val and Dean Furman being ahead of him". He made his first start for "Donny" on 14 April, in a 0–0 draw at Leyton Orient. Coach Rob Jones had also appointed him as captain of the youth team for the 2014–15 season, and Middleton helped the squad to a second-place finish in the final Third Development League, before he signed a new two-year contract in June 2015.

He worked with the club's new nutritionist in the 2015–16 pre-season and bulked up significantly as a result. He established himself as a first-team regular, making 41 appearances across the campaign; however, Doncaster were relegated into League Two. He signed a new three-and-a-half-year deal in December 2015. He made six starts and 19 substitute appearances in League Two in the 2016–17 season as Rovers finished in third-place to secure automatic promotion at the first attempt. However, he was one of five players transfer listed in May 2017. Two months later manager Darren Ferguson said the only enquiries made for Middleton came from Swindon Town, who did not make any formal offer, and he went on to criticise Middleton's agent for failing to find him a move away from the Keepmoat Stadium.

=== Port Vale ===
On 31 August 2017, Middleton signed a one-year contract with newly relegated League Two side Port Vale as manager Michael Brown's 19th summer signing. On 11 November 2017, he was allowed to join FC Halifax Town on loan, a National League club previously coached by new "Valiants" manager Neil Aspin. Middleton said "I didn't see coming here as a step back. I saw it as a way to kick-start my career". He was released upon the expiry of his contract at Vale Park in May 2018.

=== Non-League ===
On 1 August 2018, Middleton signed a one-year contract with National League North side Alfreton Town. After three months at North Street, during which time he featured just six times from the bench, he left the "Reds" and joined Northern Premier League Premier Division club Gainsborough Trinity. The "Holy Blues" ended the 2018–19 season in sixth-place, one point outside the play-offs; Middleton signed a new contract in the summer.

On 13 December 2019, Middleton joined Northern Premier League Division One South East club Cleethorpes Town. He scored his first career goal on 22 February, as he opened the scoring for the "Owls" in a 5–0 victory over Spalding United. The 2019–20 season was abandoned and all results voided due to the COVID-19 pandemic in England. He signed with Northern Premier League Premier Division side Grantham Town on 7 July 2020, joining his brother Ben. However, he returned to Cleethorpes by September. He scored two goals in eight games before the 2020–21 season was curtailed due to the ongoing pandemic. He joined Northern Counties East League Premier Division side Barton Town on a dual registration deal on 12 November 2021 after "Swans" midfielder Josh Baker underwent surgery on his foot. He played five games for Barton under player-manager Nathan Jarman. He scored one goal from 29 games for Cleethorpes in the 2021–22 campaign. He retired from football in 2022 in order to become an officer with South Yorkshire Police after completing a Police Constable Degree Apprenticeship at Sheffield Hallam University. He later combined his policework with spells in non-League with Belper Town, Cleethorpes Town, Rossington Main. He signed with Maltby Main in June 2025. He played 36 games in the 2025–26 campaign, scoring four goals.

== Style of play ==
Middleton described himself as a creative deep-lying midfielder.

== Personal life ==
His twin, Ben, had a non-League football career. They played as teammates at Belper Town.

== Career statistics ==
As of match played 11 April 2026

Appearances and goals by club, season and competition
Club	Season	League			FA Cup		EFL Cup		Other		Total	
Club	Season	Division	Apps	Goals	Apps	Goals	Apps	Goals	Apps	Goals	Apps	Goals
Doncaster Rovers	2012–13	League One	0	0	0	0	0	0	1 (Note: Appearance(s) in Football League Trophy / EFL Trophy.)	0	1	0
Doncaster Rovers	2013–14	Championship	0	0	0	0	0	0	—		0	0
Doncaster Rovers	2014–15	League One	4	0	1	0	0	0	1	0	6	0
Doncaster Rovers	2015–16	League One	34	0	3	0	2	0	2	0	41	0
Doncaster Rovers	2016–17	EFL League Two	25	0	1	0	1	0	3	0	30	0
Doncaster Rovers	2017–18	EFL League One	0	0	0	0	0	0	1	0	1	0
Doncaster Rovers	Total		63	0	5	0	3	0	8	0	79	0
Port Vale	2017–18	EFL League Two	6	0	0	0	—		0	0	6	0
FC Halifax Town (loan)	2017–18	National League	5	0	0	0	—		0	0	5	0
Alfreton Town	2018–19	National League North	6	0	0	0	—		0	0	6	0
Gainsborough Trinity	2018–19	Northern Premier League; Premier Division	5	0	0	0	—		0	0	5	0
Gainsborough Trinity	2019–20	Northern Premier League; Premier Division	14	0	3	0	—		2 (Note: Appearance(s) in FA Trophy.)	0	19	0
Gainsborough Trinity	Total		19	0	3	0	0	0	2	0	24	0
Cleethorpes Town	2019–20	Northern Premier League; Division One South East	14	1	0	0	—		0	0	14	1
Grantham Town	2020–21	Northern Premier League; Premier Division	0	0	0	0	—		0	0	0	0
Cleethorpes Town	2020–21	Northern Premier League; Division One South East	7	2	1	0	—		0	0	8	2
Cleethorpes Town	2021–22	Northern Premier League; Division One South East	24	1	4	0	—		1	0	29	1
Cleethorpes Town	Total		31	3	5	0	0	0	1	0	37	3
Barton Town (dual registration)	2021–22	Northern Counties East League; Premier Division	5	0	0	0	—		0	0	5	0
Belper Town	2022–23	Northern Premier League; Premier Division	36	5	1	0	—		3 (Note: 2 appearances in FA Trophy, 1 appearances and 1 goal in Derbyshire Senior Cup.)	1	40	6
Cleethorpes Town	2023–24	Northern Premier League; Division One East	15	0	2	0	—		3 (Note: 1 appearance in FA Trophy, 2 appearances and 1 goal in Lincolnshire Senior Cup.)	1	20	1
Maltby Main	2025–26	Northern Counties East League; Division One	34	4	0	0	—		2 (Note: 1 appearance in FA Vase, 1 appearance in Northern Counties East League League Cup)	0	36	4
Maltby Main	2026–27	United Counties League; Division One	0	0	0	0	—		0	0	0	0
Maltby Main	Total		34	4	0	0	0	0	2	0	36	4
Career total			234	13	16	0	3	0	19	2	272	15

== Honours ==
Doncaster Rovers

- EFL League Two third-place promotion: 2016–17
