= 2013–14 Doncaster Rovers F.C. season =

Doncaster Rovers
2013–14 season
- Chairman: John Ryan
- Manager: Paul Dickov
- Stadium: Keepmoat Stadium
- Championship: 22nd (relegated)
- FA Cup: Third round
- Football League Cup: Second round
- Top goalscorer: League: Chris Brown (9); All: Chris Brown (9)
- Highest home attendance: 12,609 vs Sheffield Wednesday, Championship, 22 March 2014
- Lowest home attendance: 3,899 vs Stevenage, FA Cup, 4 January 2014
Home colours	Away colours

The 2013–14 season was Doncaster Rover's 11th consecutive season in the Football League and their 5th season in the second tier of English football, following their promotion from League One in the 2012–13 season. They were relegated back to the third tier at the end of the season, after finishing in 22nd place in the Championship.

== Championship data ==
=== League table ===
Pos	Team	Pld	W	D	L	GF	GA	GD	Pts	Promotion, qualification or relegation
20	Blackpool	46	11	13	22	38	66	−28	46	
21	Birmingham City	46	11	11	24	58	74	−16	44	
22	Doncaster Rovers (R)	46	11	11	24	39	70	−31	44	Relegation to Football League One
23	Barnsley (R)	46	9	12	25	44	77	−33	39	Relegation to Football League One
24	Yeovil Town (R)	46	8	13	25	44	75	−31	37	Relegation to Football League One

Source: BBC Sport
Rules for classification: 1) points; 2) goal difference; 3) number of goals scored
(R) Relegated

=== Result summary ===
Overall								Home						Away					
Pld	W	D	L	GF	GA	GD	Pts	W	D	L	GF	GA	GD	W	D	L	GF	GA	GD
46	11	11	24	39	70	−31	44	9	4	10	27	32	−5	2	7	14	12	38	−26

Last updated: 3 May 2014.

=== Result by round ===
Round	1	2	3	4	5	6	7	8	9	10	11	12	13	14	15	16	17	18	19	20	21	22	23	24	25	26	27	28	29	30	31	32	33	34	35	36	37	38	39	40	41	42	43	44	45	46
Ground	H	H	A	H	A	A	H	A	H	H	A	A	H	A	H	A	H	A	A	H	A	H	H	A	A	H	A	H	H	A	H	A	A	H	H	A	H	A	A	H	H	A	H	A	H	A
Result	L	W	D	L	D	L	D	W	L	W	L	L	L	D	W	L	W	D	L	L	L	L	D	L	L	W	D	W	D	L	D	L	L	W	W	D	W	L	W	L	L	L	L	D	L	L
Position	23	12	11	19	13	18	19	17	18	16	17	17	20	21	18	20	18	15	20	20	20	21	21	22	22	22	20	19	19	20	20	20	20	20	20	20	19	20	18	19	19	19	19	19	21	22

Updated to match(es) played on 3 May 2014. Source:
A = Away; H = Home; W = Win; D = Draw; L = Loss

== Kit ==
Supplier: Avec
Sponsor(s): One Call Insurance

Home	Away

Last updated: 11 September 2012.
Source: Historical Football Kit – NPower Championship 2013–14

== Squad ==
=== Detailed overview ===
No.	Name	Position (s)	Nationality	Place of Birth	Date of Birth (Age)	Club caps	Club goals	Int. caps	Int. goals	Signed from	Date signed	Fee	Contract End
Goalkeepers
1	Ross Turnbull	GK	(England)	Bishop Auckland	4 January 1985 (age 41)	31	0	–	–	Chelsea	31 July 2013	Free	30 June 2014
13	Jonathan Maxted	GK	(England)		26 November 1993 (age 32)	–	–	–	–	Academy	26 June 2012	Trainee	30 June 2014
Defenders
2	Paul Quinn	RB/CB	(Scotland)	Wishaw	21 July 1985 (age 41)	65	1	–	–	Cardiff City	9 August 2012	Free	30 June 2015
3	James Husband	LB/LM	(England)	Leeds	3 January 1994 (age 32)	60	4	–	–	Academy	21 November 2011	Trainee	30 June 2014
5	Rob Jones	CB	(England)	Stockton-on-Tees	3 November 1979 (age 46)	63	9	–	–	Sheffield Wednesday	31 July 2012	Free	30 June 2015
12	Luke McCullough	CB	(Northern Ireland)	Portadown	15 February 1994 (age 32)	14	0	–	–	Manchester United	25 July 2013	Free	30 June 2015
14	Bongani Khumalo	CB/LB	(South Africa)	Manzini	6 January 1987 (age 39)	27	1	41	1	Tottenham Hotspur	31 July 2013	Free	31 May 2014
15	Liam Wakefield	CB/RB	(England)	Doncaster	9 April 1994 (age 32)	7	1	–	–	Academy	27 June 2012	Free	30 June 2014
16	Jamie McCombe	CB	(England)	Pontefract	1 January 1983 (age 43)	35	1	–	–	Huddersfield Town	12 August 2012	Free	30 June 2014
Midfielders
4	Dean Furman	CM	(South Africa)	Cape Town	22 June 1988 (age 38)	28	1	17	1	Oldham Athletic	12 July 2013	Free	30 June 2015
7	Mark Duffy	LM/RM	(England)	Liverpool	7 November 1985 (age 40)	27	2	–	–	Scunthorpe United	13 July 2013	Free	30 June 2016
11	David Cotterill	LM/RM	(Wales)	Cardiff	4 December 1987 (age 38)	73	11	20	1	Barnsley	27 June 2012	Free	30 June 2014
18	Paul Keegan	CM	(Republic of Ireland)	Dublin	5 July 1984 (age 42)	59	1	–	–	Bohemians	17 January 2011	Undisclosed	30 June 2014
19	Richie Wellens	CM	(England)	Moston, Manchester	26 March 1980 (age 46)	125	10	–	–	Leicester City	2 August 2013	Free	30 January 2014
20	James Harper	CM	(England)	Chelmsford	9 November 1980 (age 45)	29	0	–	–	Hull City	17 August 2012	Free	30 June 2014
21	Marc de Val	DM	(Spain)	Blanes	15 February 1990 (age 36)	4	0	–	–	Real Madrid	24 June 2013	Free	30 June 2015
25	Harry Forrester	AM/CF	(England)	Milton Keynes	2 January 1991 (age 35)	7	1	–	–	Brentford	31 July 2013	Free	30 June 2016
26	James Coppinger	RW/LW	(England)	Guisborough	10 January 1981 (age 45)	388	38	–	–	Exeter City	30 June 2004	£30,000	30 June 2014
Forwards
8	Billy Paynter	CF/RW	(England)	Liverpool	13 July 1984 (age 42)	49	14	–	–	Leeds United	13 August 2012	Undisclosed	30 June 2014
9	Chris Brown	CF	(England)	Doncaster	11 December 1984 (age 41)	99	29	–	–	Preston North End	14 July 2011	Free	30 June 2015
22	Theo Robinson	CF/RW	(Jamaica)	Birmingham	22 January 1989 (age 37)	22	5	6	0	Derby County	15 August 2013	Undisclosed	30 June 2015
23	Kyle Bennett	RW/LW/CF	(England)	Telford	9 September 1990 (age 36)	81	8	–	–	Bury	1 July 2011	£80,000	30 June 2015

=== Statistics ===
As of 3 May 2014

No.	Pos	Nat	Player	Total		Championship		FA Cup		League Cup	
No.	Pos	Nat	Player	Apps	Goals	Apps	Goals	Apps	Goals	Apps	Goals
1	GK	(England) ENG	Ross Turnbull	31	0	28	0	1	0	2	0
2	DF	(Scotland) SCO	Paul Quinn	37	2	31+4	2	1	0	0+1	0
3	DF	(England) ENG	James Husband	30	1	28	1	0	0	2	0
4	MF	(South Africa) RSA	Dean Furman	35	1	25+7	1	1	0	2	0
5	DF	(England) ENG	Rob Jones	14	1	12	1	0	0	2	0
6	MF	(England) ENG	Dave Syers	4	0	0+2	0	1	0	0+1	0
7	MF	(England) ENG	Mark Duffy	39	2	28+8	2	1	0	1+1	0
8	FW	(England) ENG	Billy Paynter	12	1	1+8	0	0+1	0	0+2	1
9	FW	(England) ENG	Chris Brown	43	9	38+2	9	1	0	2	0
10	FW	(England) ENG	Billy Sharp (on loan from Southampton)	16	4	15+1	4	0	0	0	0
11	MF	(Wales) WAL	David Cotterill	43	4	25+15	4	1	0	2	0
12	DF	(Northern Ireland) NIR	Luke McCullough	15	0	13+1	0	1	0	0	0
13	GK	(England) ENG	Jonathan Maxted	0	0	0	0	0	0	0	0
14	DF	(South Africa) RSA	Bongani Khumalo (on loan from Tottenham Hotspur)	32	1	30	0	0	0	2	1
15	DF	(England) ENG	Liam Wakefield	5	1	3+1	0	1	1	0	0
16	DF	(England) ENG	Jamie McCombe	2	0	0+2	0	0	0	0	0
17	DF	(Romania) ROU	Gabriel Tamaș	14	0	13+1	0	0	0	0	0
18	MF	(Republic of Ireland) IRL	Paul Keegan	34	0	34	0	0	0	0	0
19	MF	(England) ENG	Richie Wellens	39	0	36+1	0	0	0	2	0
20	DF	(Ivory Coast) CIV	Abdoulaye Méïté	21	1	21	1	0	0	0	0
21	MF	(Spain) ESP	Marc de Val	5	0	2+3	0	0	0	0	0
22	FW	(Jamaica) JAM	Theo Robinson	32	5	19+12	5	0	0	1	0
23	MF	(England) ENG	Kyle Bennett	4	0	0+3	0	0+1	0	0	0
25	MF	(England) ENG	Harry Forrester	9	1	3+4	0	0+1	1	0+1	0
26	MF	(England) ENG	James Coppinger	43	4	34+7	4	0	0	2	0
27	DF	(Australia) AUS	Lucas Neill	4	0	4	0	0	0	0	0
28	DF	(England) ENG	Louis Tomlinson	0	0	0	0	0	0	0	0
30	FW	(England) ENG	Alex Peterson	5	0	1+4	0	0	0	0	0
31	DF	(Republic of Ireland) IRL	Enda Stevens (on loan from Aston Villa)	14	0	11+2	0	1	0	0	0
33	GK	(England) ENG	Sam Johnstone (on loan from Manchester United)	18	0	18	0	0	0	0	0
34	FW	(England) ENG	Jordan Bowery (on loan from Aston Villa)	3	0	3	0	0	0	0	0
	MF	(Scotland) SCO	Martin Woods	5	0	3+1	0	1	0	0	0
Players who left the club during the season:
10	FW	(Italy) ITA	Federico Macheda (on loan Manchester United)	15	3	12+3	3	0	0	0	0
20	MF	(England) ENG	James Harper	0	0	0	0	0	0	0	0
27	DF	(South Korea) KOR	Yun Suk-Young (on loan from Queens Park Rangers)	3	0	2+1	0	0	0	0	0
32	DF	(England) ENG	Reece Wabara (on loan from Manchester City)	15	0	13	0	0	0	2	0

==== Captains ====
As of 26 October 2013

No.	P	Name	Country	No. games	Notes
5	DF	Rob Jones	(England)	13	Club captain

Source: Competitive match reports.
Competitive matches only
Matches started as captain only
Country: FIFA nationality; No.: Squad number; P: Position; Name: Player name; No. Games: Number of games started as captain.

==== Goals record ====
As of 3 May 2014

Rank	No.	Po.	Name	Championship	FA Cup	League Cup	Total
1	9	FW	Chris Brown	9	0	0	9
2	22	FW	Theo Robinson	5	0	0	5
3	10	FW	Billy Sharp	4	0	0	4
3	26	MF	James Coppinger	4	0	0	4
5	10	FW	Federico Macheda	3	0	0	3
5	7	MF	Mark Duffy	3	0	0	3
5	11	MF	David Cotterill	3	0	0	3
8	2	DF	Paul Quinn	2	0	0	2
9	3	DF	James Husband	1	0	0	1
9	4	MF	Dean Furman	1	0	0	1
9	5	DF	Rob Jones	1	0	0	1
9	8	FW	Billy Paynter	0	0	1	1
9	14	DF	Bongani Khumalo	0	0	1	1
9	15	DF	Liam Wakefield	0	1	0	1
9	20	DF	Abdoulaye Méïté	1	0	0	1
9	25	MF	Harry Forrester	0	1	0	1
9	Own Goals			2	0	0	2
Total				39	2	2	43

==== Disciplinary record ====
As of 3 May 2014

No.	Pos.	Name	Championship			FA Cup			League Cup			Total		
No.	Pos.	Name	Booked	(yellow card) (yellow-red card)	Sent off (straight red)	Booked	(yellow card) (yellow-red card)	Sent off (straight red)	Booked	(yellow card) (yellow-red card)	Sent off (straight red)	Booked	(yellow card) (yellow-red card)	Sent off (straight red)
1	GK	Ross Turnbull	2	0	0	1	0	0	0	0	0	3	0	0
2	DF	Paul Quinn	4	0	0	0	0	0	0	0	0	4	0	0
3	DF	James Husband	5	0	0	0	0	0	0	0	0	5	0	0
4	MF	Dean Furman	4	1	0	1	0	0	0	0	0	5	1	0
7	MF	Mark Duffy	3	0	0	0	0	0	0	0	0	3	0	0
9	FW	Chris Brown	7	0	0	0	0	0	1	0	0	8	0	0
10	FW	Federico Macheda	3	0	1	0	0	0	0	0	0	3	0	1
10	FW	Billy Sharp	1	0	1	0	0	0	0	0	0	1	0	1
11	MF	David Cotterill	3	0	0	0	0	0	0	0	0	3	0	0
14	DF	Bongani Khumalo	5	0	0	0	0	0	0	0	0	5	0	0
17	DF	Gabriel Tamaș	2	0	0	0	0	0	0	0	0	2	0	0
18	MF	Paul Keegan	6	0	0	0	0	0	0	0	0	6	0	0
19	MF	Richie Wellens	11	0	0	0	0	0	0	0	0	11	0	0
20	DF	Abdoulaye Méïté	4	0	1	0	0	0	0	0	0	4	0	1
21	MF	Marc de Val	1	0	0	0	0	0	0	0	0	1	0	0
22	FW	Theo Robinson	2	0	0	0	0	0	0	0	0	2	0	0
26	MF	James Coppinger	2	0	0	0	0	0	0	0	0	2	0	0
31	DF	Enda Stevens	1	0	0	0	0	0	0	0	0	1	0	0
32	DF	Reece Wabara	2	0	0	0	0	0	0	0	0	2	0	0
33	GK	Sam Johnstone	2	0	0	0	0	0	0	0	0	2	0	0
Total			70	1	3	2	0	0	1	0	0	73	1	3

=== Contracts ===
As of 25 October 2013

No.	Pos.	Nat.	Name	Age	Status	Contract length	Expiry date	Source
23	MF	(England)	Kyle Bennett	22	Signed	2 years	June 2015	BBC Sport
9	FW	(England)	Chris Brown	28	Signed	2 years	June 2015	BBC Sport
	DF	(England)	Andy Griffin	47	Talks	Undisclosed	Undisclosed	Doncaster Free Press
18	MF	(Republic of Ireland)	Paul Keegan	29	Signed	1 year	June 2014	BBC Sport
13	GK	(England)	Jonathan Maxted	19	Signed	1 year	June 2014	Doncaster Rovers FC
2	DF	(Scotland)	Paul Quinn	41	Signed	2 years	June 2015	Doncaster Rovers F.C. Official Twitter
14	DF	(England)	Tommy Spurr	25	Rejected	Rejected	June 2013	Doncaster Rovers FC
1	GK	(Scotland) (England)	Neil Sullivan	43	Rejected	Rejected	June 2013	BBC Sport
15	DF	(England)	Liam Wakefield	19	Signed	1 year	June 2014	Doncaster Rovers FC
19	MF	(England)	Richie Wellens	33	Signed	4 months	January 2014	BBC Sport

== Transfers ==
As of 25 October 2013

=== In ===
No.	Pos.	Nat.	Name	Age	EU	Moving from	Type	Transfer window	Ends	Transfer fee	Source
21	MF	(Spain)	Marc de Val	23	EU	Real Madrid (Spain)	Free Transfer	Summer	2015	Free	BBC Sport
4	MF	(South Africa)	Dean Furman	25	EU	Oldham Athletic	Free Transfer	Summer	2015	Free	Doncaster Rovers FC
7	MF	(England)	Mark Duffy	27	EU	Scunthorpe United	Transfer	Summer	2016	Undisclosed	Doncaster Rovers FC
12	DF	(Northern Ireland)	Luke McCullough	19	EU	Manchester United	Free Transfer	Summer	2015	Free	BBC Sport
	MF	(England)	Harry Forrester	22	EU	Brentford	Bosman Transfer	Summer	2016	Tribunal	Doncaster Rovers FC
14	DF	(South Africa)	Bongani Khumalo	26	EU	Tottenham Hotspur	Loan	Summer	2014	Season Long Loan	BBC Sport
1	GK	(England)	Ross Turnbull	28	EU	Chelsea	Free Transfer	Summer	2014	Free	Doncaster Rovers FC
28	DF	(England)	Louis Tomlinson	21	EU			Summer	Non-contract	Free	Doncaster Rovers FC
19	MF	(England)	Richie Wellens	33	EU	Leicester City	Free Transfer	Summer	2013	Free	Doncaster Rovers FC
22	FW	(Jamaica) (England)	Theo Robinson	24	EU	Derby County	Transfer	Summer	2015	Undisclosed	BBC Sport

- Total outgoings: ▼ ~ Undisclosed

=== Loans in ===
No.	Pos.	Name	Country	Age	Loan club	Started	Ended	Start source	End source
32	DF	Reece Wabara	(England)	34	Manchester City	6 August		BBC Sport	
10	FW	Federico Macheda	(Italy)	22	Manchester United	16 September	8 October	BBC Sport	BBC Sport

Sources: For loan start source see "Start source". For loan end source see "End source".
EU = if holds or not a European Union passport; Country: when 2 flags, 1st flag = country that plays for internationally, 2nd flag = country of birth; No. = number on jersey; P = Position (for position name, pause mouse pointer on abbreviation); Name = Name on jersey (for more extensive name, pause mouse pointer on name); In/Out = In: The player came in on loan, Out: The player went out on loan; Loan club = the club that the player moved on loan to or the club that the player came from on loan; Started = the date when the player's loan started; Ended = the date when the player's loan ended.

=== Out ===
No.	Pos.	Name	Country	Age	Type	Moving to	Transfer window	Transfer fee	Apps	Goals	Source
7	MF	Martin Woods	(Scotland)	27	Contract Ended	Free agent	Summer	Free	131	10	football365
21	MF	Lee Fowler	(Wales)	30	Contract Ended	Free agent	Summer	Free	4	0	football365
25	FW	Jordan Ball	(England)	19	Contract Ended	Free agent	Summer	Free	2	1	football365
31	MF	Patrick Mullen	(England)	19	Contract Ended	Free agent	Summer	Free	0	0	football365
33	GK	Gary Woods	(England)	22	Contract Ended	Free agent	Summer	Free	97	0	football365
1	GK	Neil Sullivan	(Scotland) (England)	43	Contract Ended	Retired	Summer	Free	208	0	BBC Sport
14	DF	Tommy Spurr	(England)	25	Contract Ended	Free agent	Summer	Free	73	1	Doncaster Rovers FC

EU = if holds or not a European Union passport; Country: when 2 flags, 1st flag = country that plays for internationally, 2nd flag = country of birth; N = number on jersey; P = Position (for position name, pause mouse pointer on abbreviation); Name = Name on jersey (for more extensive name, pause mouse pointer on name); Age = age on the day of the signing; Moving from = only indicate the club the player was playing before start playing for this club in this season, for the type of the moving see Status column; Moving to = only indicates the club the player is going to play next, for the type of the moving see Status column; Ends = when the player's current contract ends; n/a = Not applicable; Apps = Total number of competitive appearances (including substitute appearances) at the club prior to departure; Goals = Total number of competitive goals scored at the club prior to departure.
- Total income: ▲ ~ £0

== Fixtures ==
=== Pre-season ===
2 July 2013	Frickley Athletic	0–4	Doncaster Rovers	South Elmsall
19:45		Report	Keegan 24'; Brown 33', 44'; Syers 72'	Stadium: Westfield Lane

6 July 2013	Retford United	2–4	Doncaster Rovers	Retford
15:00	Thompson	Report	(x3) Brown; Syers	Stadium: The Jones & Co. Stadium

9 July 2013	Rossington Main	0–3	Doncaster Rovers	Rossington
19:45		Report	9' Brown; 15' Quinn; 19' Syers	Stadium: Oxford Street

13 July 2013	Doncaster Rovers	0–0	Motherwell	Doncaster
15:00		Report		Stadium: Keepmoat Stadium; Attendance: 1,983; Referee: James Alcock

27 July 2013	Bradford City	1–2	Doncaster Rovers	Bradford
15:00	Thompson 55'	Report	24' Cotterill; 84' Bennett	Stadium: Valley Parade; Attendance: 2,856

=== Championship ===
3 August 2013 1	Doncaster Rovers	1–3	Blackpool	Doncaster
15:00	Jones 60'	Report	17' Davies; 87' MacKenzie; 90+5' Ince	Stadium: Keepmoat Stadium; Attendance: 9,002; Referee: Andy Woolmer

16 August 2013 2	Doncaster Rovers	2–0	Blackburn Rovers	Doncaster
15:00	Robinson 37'; Husband 59'	Report		Stadium: Keepmoat Stadium; Attendance: 8,707; Referee: Geoff Eltringham

20 August 2013 3	Wigan Athletic	2–2	Doncaster Rovers	Wigan
19:45	Maloney 57'; Barnett 90'	Report	25' Robinson; 43' Brown	Stadium: DW Stadium; Attendance: 14,304; Referee: Boyeson

31 August 2013 4	Doncaster Rovers	0–1	Bournemouth	Doncaster
15:00		Report	31' Pitman	Stadium: Keepmoat Stadium; Attendance: 6,769; Referee: Hooper

14 September 2013 5	Huddersfield Town	0–0	Doncaster Rovers	Huddersfield
15:00		Report		Stadium: John Smith's Stadium; Attendance: 13,102; Referee: Tierney

17 September 2013 6	Watford	2–1	Doncaster Rovers	Watford
19:45	McGugan 13', 87' (pen.)	Report	16' Brown	Stadium: Vicarage Road; Attendance: 13,988; Referee: Drysdale

21 September 2013 7	Doncaster Rovers	2–2	Nottingham Forest	Doncaster
15:00	Macheda 34', 52'	Report	39' Cohen; 81' Reid	Stadium: Keepmoat Stadium; Attendance: 12,253; Referee: Haines

28 September 2013 8	Sheffield Wednesday	0–1	Doncaster Rovers	Sheffield
15:00		Report	71' Macheda	Stadium: Hillsborough; Attendance: 21,871; Referee: Moss

1 October 2013 9	Doncaster Rovers	0–2	Burnley	Doncaster
19:45		Report	45' (pen.) Vokes; 87' (o.g.) Jones	Stadium: Keepmoat Stadium; Attendance: 7,836; Referee: Roger East

5 October 2013 10	Doncaster Rovers	1–0	Leicester City	Doncaster
15:00	Schmeichel 17' (o.g.)	Report		Stadium: Keepmoat Stadium; Attendance: 10,003; Referee: Mark Heywood

19 October 2013 11	Reading	4–1	Doncaster Rovers	Reading
15:00	Guthrie 11'; Le Fondre 39'; McCleary 80'; Pogrebnyak 90'	Report	31' Robinson	Stadium: Madjeski Stadium; Attendance: 17,697; Referee: Andy D'Urso

25 October 2013 12	Middlesbrough	4–0	Doncaster Rovers	Middlesbrough
19:45	Adomah 8', 35'; Kamara 67'; Ayala 83'	Report		Stadium: Riverside Stadium; Attendance: 21,882; Referee: Michael Naylor

2 November 2013 13	Doncaster Rovers	1–3	Brighton & Hove Albion	Doncaster
15:00	Brown 75'	Report	8' Forster-Caskey; 85' Lita; 90' D.López	Stadium: Keepmoat Stadium; Attendance: 7,396

9 November 2013 14	Barnsley	0–0	Doncaster Rovers	Barnsley
15:00 BST		Report		Stadium: Oakwell; Attendance: 11,843; Referee: Kevin Friend

22 November 2013 15	Doncaster Rovers	2–1	Yeovil Town	Doncaster
19:45	Furman 11'; Duffy 82'	Report	Webster 43'	Stadium: Keepmoat Stadium; Attendance: 6,620; Referee: Stuart Attwell

26 November 2013 16	Charlton Athletic	2–0	Doncaster Rovers	London
19:45	Stephens 39'; Church 60'	Report		Stadium: The Valley; Attendance: 14,140; Referee: S. Hooper

30 November 2013 17	Doncaster Rovers	2–1	Queens Park Rangers	Doncaster
15:00 GMT	Theo Robinson 48'; Paul Quinn 89'	Report	Austin 43'	Stadium: Keepmoat Stadium; Attendance: 8,854; Referee: O. Langford

22 November 2013 18	Birmingham City	1–1	Doncaster Rovers	Birmingham
19:45	Novak 29'	Report	Cotterill 43'	Stadium: St. Andrews; Attendance: 12,663; Referee: Brendan Malone

7 December 2013 19	Bolton Wanderers	3–0	Doncaster Rovers	Bolton
15:00 GMT	Mason 33'; Moritz 39'; Danns 90'	Report		Stadium: Reebok Stadium; Attendance: 15,471; Referee: Richard Clark

14 December 2013 20	Doncaster Rovers	0–3	Leeds United	Doncaster
15:00 GMT		Report	Smith 18'; McCormack 76'; Austin 88'	Stadium: Keepmoat Stadium; Attendance: 12,192; Referee: Phil Dowd

21 December 2013 21	Derby County	3–1	Doncaster Rovers	Derby
15:00	Ward 13'; Dawkins 50'; Bryson 78'	Report	Buxton 64' (o.g.)	Stadium: Pride Park Stadium; Attendance: 26,314 (628 away fans); Referee: Nigel Miller

26 December 2013 22	Doncaster Rovers	0–3	Ipswich Town	Doncaster
15:00	Quinn (yellow card) 80'	Report	McGoldrick 24', 51'; Chambers 30'	Stadium: Keepmoat Stadium; Attendance: 7,753; Referee: Harrington

29 December 2013 23	Doncaster Rovers	0–0	Millwall	Doncaster
15:00	Furman (yellow card) 15'	Report	Dunne (yellow card) 90+2'	Stadium: Keepmoat Stadium; Attendance: 6,454; Referee: Kevin Wright

1 January 2014 24	Queens Park Rangers	2–1	Doncaster Rovers	London
15:00 GMT	O'Neil (yellow card) 13'; Phillips 55'; Austin 90+3'; Johnson (yellow card) 90+4'	Report	Robinson 43'; Brown (yellow card) 86'	Stadium: Loftus Road; Attendance: 15,807; Referee: Graham Scott

11 January 2014 25	Blackburn Rovers	1–0	Doncaster Rovers	Blackburn
15:00	Lowe (yellow card) 7'; Gestede 45'; Henley (yellow card) 60'	Report	Wellens (yellow card) 4'; Husband (yellow card) 36'; Méïté (yellow card) 45+2'; Khumalo (yellow card) 66'	Stadium: Ewood Park; Attendance: 13,954; Referee: Jeremy Simpson

18 January 2014 26	Doncaster Rovers	3–0	Wigan Athletic	Doncaster
15:00	Brown 7', 69' (pen.); Tamaș (yellow card) 43'; Coppinger 52'; Keegan (yellow card) 78'	Report	McManaman (yellow card) 73'	Stadium: Keepmoat Stadium; Attendance: 8,331; Referee: Keith Hill

25 January 2014 27	Blackpool	1–1	Doncaster Rovers	Blackpool
15:00	Halliday 78'; McMahon (yellow card) 88'	Report	Khumalo (yellow card) 3'; Sharp 85'	Stadium: Bloomfield Road; Attendance: 13,468; Referee: David Coote

28 January 2014 28	Doncaster Rovers	3–0	Charlton Athletic	Doncaster
19:45	Méïté 26'; Brown 36' (pen.); Duffy 67'	Report	Wilson (red card) 35'; Stephens (yellow card) 75'	Stadium: Keepmoat Stadium; Attendance: 7,289; Referee: Paul Tierney

1 February 2014 29	Doncaster Rovers	0–0	Middlesbrough	Doncaster
15:00	Wellens (yellow card) 37'	Report	Dean Whitehead (yellow card) 90+3'	Stadium: Keepmoat Stadium; Attendance: 11,440; Referee: Andy Davies

8 February 2014 30	Brighton & Hove Albion	1–0	Doncaster Rovers	Brighton
15:00	Ulloa 75' (yellow card) 80'	Report	Brown (yellow card) 39'; Méïté (yellow card) 44'; Husband (yellow card) 63'; Sharp (red card) 86'; Khumalo (yellow card) 90+3'	Stadium: Falmer Stadium; Attendance: 27,009; Referee: Gavin Ward

15 February 2014 31	Doncaster Rovers	2–2	Barnsley	Doncaster
15:00	Coppinger 45', 55'	Report	Proschwitz 27', 89'; Cranie (yellow card) 38'	Stadium: Keepmoat Stadium; Attendance: 10,216; Referee: Andy D'Urso

22 February 2014 32	Yeovil Town	1–0	Doncaster Rovers	Yeovil
15:00	Hayter 59' (o.g.)	Report	Duffy (yellow card) 56'; Brown (yellow card) 78'; Cotterill (yellow card) 90+3'	Stadium: Huish Park; Attendance: 4,934; Referee: Darren Drysdale

1 March 2014 33	Bournemouth	5–0	Doncaster Rovers	Bournemouth
15:00 GMT	Kermorgant 26', 43', 73'; Arter 50', 82'	Report	Keegan (yellow card) 24'; Tamaș (yellow card) 58'; Khumalo (yellow card) 64'	Stadium: Dean Court; Attendance: 8,983; Referee: Darren Sheldrake

8 March 2014 34	Doncaster Rovers	2–0	Huddersfield Town	Doncaster
15:00 GMT	Sharp 28'; Cotterill 55'	Report		Stadium: Keepmoat Stadium; Attendance: 9,305; Referee: Mark Haywood

11 March 2014 35	Doncaster Rovers	2–1	Watford	Doncaster
19:45 GMT	Brown 24'; Keegan (yellow card) 71'; Coppinger (yellow card) 90'; Sharp 90+3'; Wellens (yellow card) 90+4'	Report	Ranégie (red card) 19'; Angella (yellow card) 30'; Cassetti (yellow card) 49'; Tőzsér (yellow card) 62'; Anya 68'; Faraoni (yellow card) 90+5'	Stadium: Keepmoat Stadium; Attendance: 6,581; Referee: Chris Sarginson

15 March 2014 36	Nottingham Forest	0–0	Doncaster Rovers	Nottingham
15:00 BST	Fox (yellow card) 29'	Report	(yellow card) 68' Brown; (yellow card) 85' Duffy; (yellow card) 90+2' Johnstone	Stadium: City Ground; Attendance: 27,402; Referee: Eddie Ilderton

22 March 2014 37	Doncaster Rovers	1–0	Sheffield Wednesday	Keepmoat Stadium
15:00 BST	Brown 32'	Report	Hutchinson (yellow card) 89'	Attendance: 12,609; Referee: Mike Dean

25 March 2014 38	Burnley	2–0	Doncaster Rovers	Burnley
19:45 BST	Vokes 47' (pen.); Stanislas 75'; Marney (yellow card) 80'	Report	Méïté (yellow card) 43'; Duffy (yellow card) 69'	Stadium: Turf Moor; Attendance: 12,325; Referee: Tony Harrington

29 March 2014 39	Leeds United	1–2	Doncaster Rovers	Leeds
15:00 BST	Lees (yellow card) 25'; Byram (yellow card) 59'; McCormack 62'; Tonge (yellow card) 85'	Report	Cotterill 23'; Quinn (yellow card) 32'; Keegan (yellow card) 42'; Sharp 45+1'; Johnstone (yellow card) 74'	Stadium: Elland Road; Attendance: 23,476; Referee: Darren Bond

5 April 2014 40	Doncaster Rovers	1–3	Birmingham City	Doncaster
15:00 BST	Keegan (yellow card) 21'; Quinn 36'	Report	Macheda 57' 76'; Spector (yellow card) 69'; Novak 71'; Žigić (yellow card) 85'; Reilly (yellow card) 90+3'	Stadium: Keepmoat Stadium; Attendance: 9,206; Referee: David Webb

8 April 2014 41	Doncaster Rovers	1–2	Bolton Wanderers	Doncaster
19:45 BST	Cotterill 18'; Husband (yellow card) 82'	Report	Danns 7' (yellow card) 81'; Mason 15'	Stadium: Keepmoat Stadium; Attendance: 7,508; Referee: Gary Sutton

12 April 2014 42	Ipswich Town	2–1	Doncaster Rovers	Ipswich
15:07 BST	Berra (yellow card) 40'; Murphy 47'; Chambers 86'	Report	Brown (yellow card) 16' (goal) 83' (pen.); Sharp (yellow card) 17'; Méïté (yellow card) 44'	Stadium: Portman Road; Attendance: 19,496; Referee: Graham Scott

18 April 2014 43	Doncaster Rovers	0–2	Derby County	Doncaster
19:30 BST	Quinn (yellow card) 64' de Val (yellow card) 90+4'	Report	Bryson (yellow card) 19'; Thorne 45'; Martin (yellow card) 70' (goal) 79'	Stadium: Keepmoat Stadium; Attendance: 11,405; Referee: Simon Hooper

21 April 2014 44	Millwall	0–0	Doncaster Rovers	London
15:00 BST	Beevers (yellow card) 45+1'; Bailey (yellow card) 86'	Report	Méïté (red card) 43'; Cotterill (yellow card) 58'	Stadium: The Den; Attendance: 12,026; Referee: Fred Graham

26 April 2014 45	Doncaster Rovers	1–3	Reading	Doncaster
15:00 BST	Coppinger 25'	Report	Le Fondre 63' (pen.); Pogrebnyak 86' 90+5'	Stadium: Keepmoat Stadium; Attendance: 10,212; Referee: Anthony Taylor

3 May 2014 46	Leicester City	1–0	Doncaster Rovers	Leicester
12:15 BST	Nugent 75' (pen.)	Report		Stadium: King Power Stadium; Attendance: 31,424; Referee: Paul Tierney

=== League Cup ===
6 August 2013 Round 1	Doncaster Rovers	1–0	Rochdale	Doncaster
19:45	Khumalo 89'	Report		Stadium: Keepmoat Stadium; Attendance: 4,368; Referee: Sutton

27 August 2013 Round 2	Doncaster Rovers	1–3	Leeds United	Doncaster
19:45	Paynter 63'	Report	41' Wootton; 77' Smith; 80' (pen.) mcCormack	Stadium: Keepmoat Stadium

=== FA Cup ===
4 January 2014 Third Round	Doncaster Rovers	2–3	Stevenage	Doncaster
15:00	Furman (yellow card) 51'; Forrester 72'; Wakefield 90+5'; Turnbull (yellow card) 90+7'	Report	Zoko 49'; Hartley 65'; Charles 90+1'	Stadium: Keepmoat Stadium; Attendance: 3,899; Referee: Scott Duncan

== Overall summary ==
=== Summary ===
As of 3 May 2014

Games played	49 (46 Championship, 1 FA Cup, 2 League Cup)
Games won	12 (11 Championship, 0 FA Cup, 1 League Cup)
Games drawn	11 (11 Championship, 0 FA Cup, 0 League Cup)
Games lost	26 (24 Championship, 1 FA Cup, 1 League Cup)
Goals scored	43 (39 Championship, 2 FA Cup, 2 League Cup)
Goals conceded	76 (70 Championship, 3 FA Cup, 3 League Cup)
Goal difference	−33
Clean sheets	14 (13 Championship, 0 FA Cup, 1 League Cup)
Yellow cards	73 (70 Championship, 2 FA Cup, 1 League Cup)
Second yellow cards	1 (1 Championship, 0 FA Cup, 0 League Cup)
Red cards	3 (3 Championship, 0 FA Cup, 0 League Cup)
Worst discipline	Dean Furman (5 (yellow card) , 1 (yellow card) (yellow-red card) ), Abdoulaye Méïté (4 (yellow card) , 1 (red card) )
Best result	3–0 vs Wigan Athletic, Charlton Athletic
Worst result	0–5 vs Bournemouth
Most appearances	David Cotterill, James Coppinger, Chris Brown (43)
Top scorer	Chris Brown (9)
Points	44

=== Score overview ===
As of 3 May 2014

Opposition	Home score	Away score	Double
Barnsley	2–2	0–0	No
Birmingham City	1–3	1–1	No
Blackburn Rovers	2–0	0–1	No
Blackpool	1–3	1–1	No
Bolton Wanderers	0–3	1–2	No
Bournemouth	0–1	0–5	No
Brighton & Hove Albion	1–3	0–1	No
Burnley	0–2	0–2	No
Charlton Athletic	3–0	0–2	No
Derby County	0–2	1–3	No
Huddersfield Town	2–0	0–0	No
Ipswich Town	0–3	1–2	No
Leeds United	0–3	2–1	No
Leicester City	1–0	0–1	No
Middlesbrough	0–0	0–4	No
Millwall	0–0	0–0	No
Nottingham Forest	2–2	0–0	No
Queens Park Rangers	2–1	1–2	No
Reading	1–3	1–4	No
Sheffield Wednesday	1–0	1–0	Yes
Watford	2–1	1–2	No
Wigan Athletic	3–0	2–2	No
Yeovil Town	2–1	1–2	No
