= Abdul Razak (footballer) =

Ivorian footballer

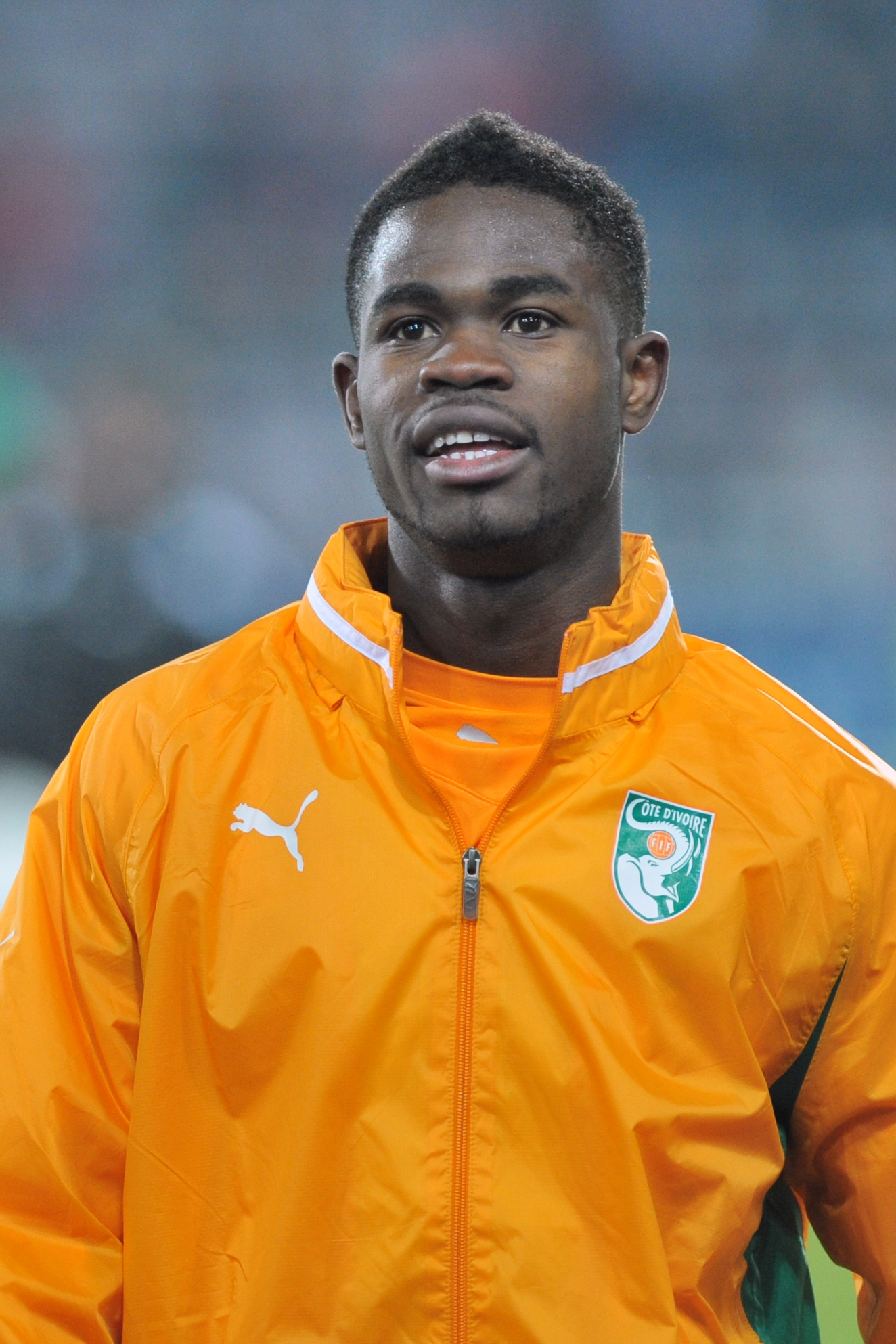
- Razak with the Ivory Coast in 2012

Personal information
- Full name: Abdul Razak
- Date of birth: 11 November 1992 (age 34)
- Place of birth: Bouaké, Ivory Coast
- Height: 1.81 m (5 ft 11 in)
- Position: Midfielder

Youth career
- 2007–2010: Crystal Palace
- 2010–2011: Manchester City

Senior career*
Years	Team	Apps	(Gls)
2011–2013	Manchester City	5	(0)
2011	→ Portsmouth (loan)	3	(0)
2012	→ Brighton & Hove Albion (loan)	6	(0)
2012	→ Charlton Athletic (loan)	2	(0)
2013	→ Anzhi Makhachkala (loan)	1	(0)
2013–2014	Anzhi Makhachkala	6	(0)
2014	West Ham United	0	(0)
2014–2015	OFI	9	(0)
2015	Doncaster Rovers	9	(0)
2016	AFC Eskilstuna	12	(0)
2017	IFK Göteborg	5	(0)
2017	→ AFC Eskilstuna (loan)	9	(0)
2018–2019	IK Sirius	21	(1)
2020–2021	Örgryte IS	32	(0)
Total		120	(1)

International career
2012–2013	Ivory Coast	5	(0)
- * Club domestic league appearances and goals as of 29 May 2021

Abdul Razak (born 11 November 1992) is an Ivorian former professional footballer who played as a midfielder.

He came through the youth academies at Crystal Palace and Manchester City, signing professional terms with the latter and playing in five Premier League games. He also played in and won the FA Community Shield in 2012. Whilst a City player he spent time on loan with Portsmouth, Brighton & Hove Albion, Charlton Athletic and Russian Premier League side Anzhi Makhachkala. He joined Anzhi on a permanent deal in 2013, but a season later returned to England with West Ham United. He would go on to play for OFI, Doncaster Rovers, AFC Eskilstuna, IFK Göteborg, IK Sirius and Örgryte IS.

Razak earned five caps for the Ivory Coast national team from 2012 to 2013, and played at the 2013 Africa Cup of Nations.

== Club career ==
=== Manchester City ===
Having left Crystal Palace's youth set-up in 2008, Razak joined the Manchester City Elite Development Squad in July 2010. However, he was not chosen to play his first game for the EDS until 3 February 2011 when he was one of the starting eleven in the EDS team that beat the Bury reserve team 2–0 at Ewen Fields in the Manchester Senior Cup. Only two days later, Razak was then given a surprise debut for the first team, coming on as a substitute for David Silva in the final minutes of the Premier League game against West Bromwich Albion on 5 February 2011, a 3–0 win at the City of Manchester Stadium. His unexpected first team debut makes Razak the ninth youth player to graduate from Manchester City's academy under manager Roberto Mancini in just over a year of the latter's management at the club. The day after his debut for the Manchester City first team Razak was added to the first team squad. In his second game for the EDS team three days later the young Ivorian was shown a straight red card for a rash challenge in the 51st minute of the Premier Reserve League North game against Bolton Wanderers.

He made his first start on 21 September 2011 in the third round of the Football League Cup against Birmingham City, playing for 86 minutes before being substituted for Luca Scapuzzi. He ended that season with one league appearance as Manchester City won the 2011–12 Premier League in dramatic circumstances on the last day of the season.

On 28 October 2011, Razak was loaned to Championship club Portsmouth on a one-month deal. He made his debut against Derby County the next day, coming on as a 62nd-minute substitute in a game Portsmouth lost 3–1. After one month with Pompey and three appearances, Razak returned to Manchester City.

On 17 February 2012, Razak, along with fellow City youngster Gai Assulin joined Championship side Brighton & Hove Albion on a three-month loan deal.

On 12 August 2012, Razak was an unused substitute as City won the 2012 FA Community Shield 3–2 against Chelsea at Villa Park.

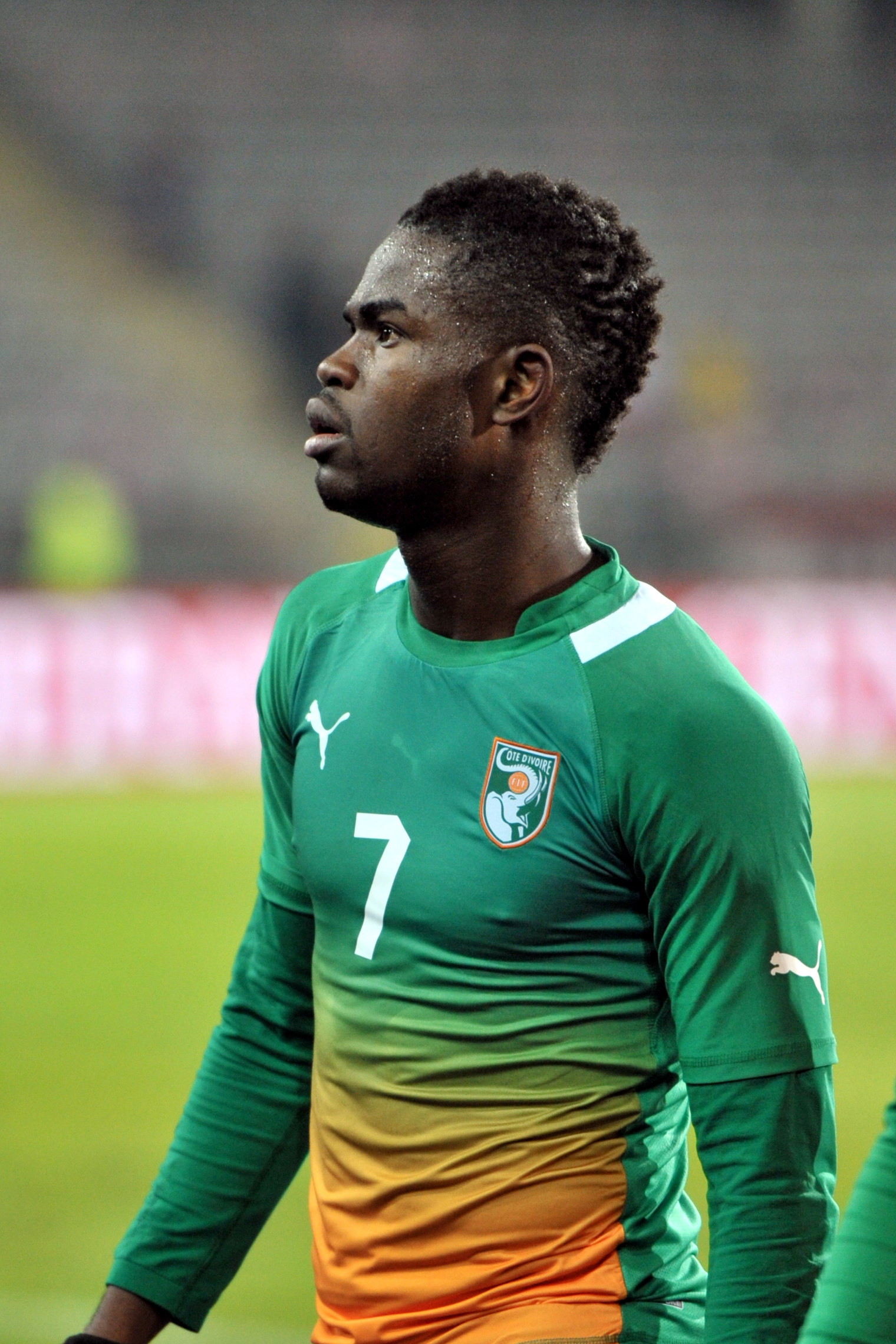
Razak playing for the Ivory Coast in 2012

On 29 September 2012, Razak joined a third Championship club, Charlton Athletic, on a three-month loan deal. After one month, he returned to Manchester City having made only two first team appearances.

=== Later career ===
On 2 September 2013, Razak joined Russian club Anzhi Makhachkala on a season-long loan deal, with a trigger clause that once he made an appearance for Anzhi the transfer becomes a permanent one. On 17 October, the clause was activated.

On 30 January 2014, Razak returned to the Premier League, when he joined West Ham United on a short-term contract. In April that year, he left the club without having played a first team game.

Razak played for OFI in Super League Greece before coming back to England to train with Doncaster Rovers. On 10 February 2015, he signed for Rovers for the rest of the League One season.

In January 2017, Razak transferred from AFC Eskilstuna to IFK Göteborg on a three-year deal. After only five appearances and a loan back to AFC, in February 2018 he left for another Swedish team, IK Sirius Fotboll. In February 2020, he signed for Örgryte IS, IFK's rivals.

== International career ==
Razak made his début for the Ivory Coast national football team against Russia in a friendly match in August 2012. He was included in the Ivory Coast squad for the 2013 Africa Cup of Nations and was in Les Éléphants' starting line-up for their third group match against Algeria.

== Career statistics ==
=== Club ===
As of 22 August 2023

Appearances by club, season and competition
Club	Season	League			National Cup		League Cup		Continental		Other		Total	
Club	Season	Division	Apps	Goals	Apps	Goals	Apps	Goals	Apps	Goals	Apps	Goals	Apps	Goals
Manchester City	2010–11	Premier League	1	0	0	0	0	0	0	0	0	0	1	0
Manchester City	2011–12	Premier League	1	0	0	0	3	0	0	0	0	0	4	0
Manchester City	2012–13	Premier League	3	0	1	0	1	0	0	0	0	0	5	0
Manchester City	2013–14	Premier League	0	0	0	0	0	0	0	0	0	0	0	0
Manchester City	Total		5	0	1	0	4	0	0	0	0	0	10	0
Portsmouth (loan)	2011–12	Championship	3	0	0	0	0	0	–		0	0	3	0
Brighton (loan)	2011–12	Championship	6	0	0	0	0	0	–		0	0	6	0
Charlton Athletic (loan)	2012–13	Championship	2	0	0	0	0	0	–		0	0	2	0
Anzhi (loan)	2013–14	Russian Premier League	2	0	0	0	–		1	0	0	0	3	0
Anzhi (loan)	2013–14	Russian Premier League	5	0	0	0	–		3	0	0	0	8	0
Anzhi (loan)	Total		7	0	0	0	–		4	0	0	0	11	0
West Ham	2013–14	Premier League	0	0	0	0	0	0	–		0	0	0	0
OFI	2014–15	Super League Greece	9	0	0	0	–		–		0	0	9	0
Doncaster Rovers	2014–15	League One	9	0	0	0	0	0	–		0	0	0	0
Eskilstuna	2016	Superettan	12	0	1	0	–		–		0	0	13	0
Göteborg	2017	Allsvenskan	5	0	2	0	–		0	0	0	0	7	0
Eskilstuna (loan)	2017	Allsvenskan	9	0	1	0	–		0	0	0	0	10	0
Sirius	2018	Allsvenskan	12	0	1	0	–		0	0	0	0	13	0
Sirius	2019	Allsvenskan	9	1	1	0	–		0	0	0	0	10	1
Sirius	Total		21	1	2	0	–		0	0	0	0	23	1
Örgryte	2020	Superettan	28	0	1	0	–		–		0	0	29	0
Örgryte	2021	Superettan	4	0	0	0	–		–		0	0	4	0
Örgryte	Total		32	0	1	0	–		–		0	0	33	0
Career total			120	0	8	0	4	0	4	0	0	0	136	1

=== International ===
As of 14 August 2013

Ivory Coast national team
Year	Apps	Goals
2012	2	0
2013	3	0
Total	5	0

== Honours ==
Manchester City

- FA Community Shield: 2012
