= Kyle Bennett (footballer) =

English footballer (born 1990)

Personal information
- Full name: Kyle Bennett
- Date of birth: 9 September 1990 (age 36)
- Place of birth: Telford, England
- Height: 5 ft 5 in (1.65 m)
- Position: Midfielder

Team information
- Current team: Shifnal Town

Youth career
- 2000–2008: Wolverhampton Wanderers

Senior career*
Years	Team	Apps	(Gls)
2008–2010	Wolverhampton Wanderers	0	(0)
2010–2011	Bury	32	(2)
2011–2015	Doncaster Rovers	116	(15)
2013	→ Crawley Town (loan)	4	(0)
2014	→ Bradford City (loan)	18	(1)
2015–2018	Portsmouth	99	(12)
2018–2021	Bristol Rovers	48	(3)
2019	→ Swindon Town (loan)	15	(4)
2020–2021	→ Grimsby Town (loan)	13	(0)
2021–2022	AFC Telford United	13	(0)
2022–2023	Hednesford Town	45	(5)
2023	Stratford Town	16	(4)
2023–	Shifnal Town	13	(2)

International career
2008	England U18	1	(0)
- * Club domestic league appearances and goals as of 20:45, 8 January 2022 (UTC)

Kyle Bennett (born 9 September 1990) is an English footballer who plays as a midfielder for Shifnal Town.

He played professionally in the Football League for Wolverhampton Wanderers, Bury, Doncaster Rovers, Crawley Town, Bradford City, Portsmouth, Bristol Rovers, Swindon Town and Grimsby Town. In 2021 he moved into Non-league football for the first time and signed for AFC Telford United, he has since played for Hednesford Town and Stratford Town.

== Playing career ==
=== Wolverhampton Wanderers ===
Bennett began playing for Wolverhampton Wanderers at the age of seven, signing for the club at age nine. He signed a three-year professional contract in September 2007, just after has seventeenth birthday. He stayed at Molineux for two years without ever making the first team. On 10 March 2009, Bennett signed his first professional contract with the club.

In March 2010 he had a two-week trial with Leicester City and then given a trial at Port Vale. At the end of the 2009–10 season, Bennett was released by the club.

=== Bury ===
In August 2010 he joined League Two club Bury on a one-year deal, after impressing on trial.

He made his debut in a 1–0 defeat to Port Vale at Gigg Lane on 7 August 2010. He scored his first goals in professional football on 26 February 2011, when he scored twice as Bury beat Crewe Alexandra 3–1. In his first season at Bury, Bennett scored two goals in thirty-three appearances in all competitions, as he helped Bury gain promotion to League One.

=== Doncaster Rovers ===
In May 2011 he was offered a new contract by the club but the beginning of July the club confirmed he has rejected the deal in favour of a move to Doncaster Rovers, and as the clubs could not agree on a transfer fee that it would go to a transfer tribunal to determine a transfer fee. In September 2011, the transfer tribunal was concluded that Doncaster Rovers were ordered by tribunal panel to pay Bury £180,000 in compensation.

Bennett made his Doncaster Rovers debut, in the opening game of the season, coming on as a substitute for Ryan Mason in the 75th minute, in a 2–1 loss against Brighton & Hove Albion. Bennett then scored his first Doncaster Rovers goal in the first round of League Cup, in a 3–0 win over Tranmere Rovers three days later. Bennett then scored his first Doncaster Rovers league goal, in a 2–1 win over Peterborough United on 1 October 2011. Sky Sports reporter was impressed with his performance, quoting: "Kyle Bennett's introduction added pace and purpose to Donny's perspiration and the youngster deserved his clinical breakaway goal." His second goal then came on 2 January 2012 in a 2–0 win over Barnsley. Bennett's third goal later came in a 2–1 win over Nottingham Forest on 6 March 2012, followed up a week later on 13 March 2012, in a 1–1 draw against Reading. In his first season at the club, the club was relegated to League One after six seasons in Championship. Bennett's goal against Peterborough United soon earned him award of the club's Goal of the Year, though he was disappointed the club being relegated. In his first season at the club, Bennett made 39 appearances and scoring five times, in all competitions.

Ahead of the 2012–13 season, Bennett was soon linked with a move away from the club, prompting manager Dean Saunders to state he had started contract talks with Bennett. Bennett started well when he played 120 minutes in the first round of Football League Cup against York City and scored one of the penalties in the shoot-out, as Doncaster Rovers went through to the next round. Bennett then scored two goals in the first two games against Walsall and his former club, Bury. Bennett soon suffered a knee injury after facing a fitness test. After missing seven matches, Bennett made his return in a 1–1 draw against Swindon Town. Soon after, Bennett's poor performance against Bury on 2 February 2013 led the club's supporters criticising him, prompting Manager Brian Flynn to defend him. Weeks later on 26 February 2013, Bennett scored his first goal since returning from injury, in a 2–1 win over Shrewsbury Town. Bennett went on to make thirty-eight appearances and scoring three times in all competitions. Despite spending some of the half on the bench and injuries, Bennett was offered a new contract by the club and signed a two-year contract on 8 July 2013.

After spending the 2013–14 season on loan and making three appearances for Doncaster Rovers, Bennett made his return to the first team, coming on as a substitute for Harry Forrester, in the 90th minute, in a 3–0 win over Yeovil Town. Bennett scored his first goal of the season in the next game, in a 3–1 loss against Port Vale. A week later on 23 August 2014, Bennett scored his second goal of the season, in a 1–0 win over Colchester United. His third goal came on 20 September 2014, in a 3–2 win over Chesterfield. His fourth goal came on 22 November 2014, as well as, making an assist, in a 3–1 win over Rochdale. His fifth goal then came on 14 February 2015, in a 3–0 win over Yeovil Town. Bennett then scored his first brace of the season, in a 3–2 loss against Sheffield United on 7 April 2015, followed up the next game four days later against Rochdale. In the last game of the season, Bennett provided a double assist, in a 5–2 win over Scunthorpe United. Bennett finished the season, as he made forty-nine appearances and scoring eight times in all competitions. Bennett felt that his days at Doncaster Rovers would be over if the takeover had failed and giving him a chance to play in the first team.

Despite being keen to sign a new contract, Bennett was offered a new contract by the club, with Manager Dickov aimed to persuade Bennett to sign a contract with the club. However, Bennett turned down a contract with Doncaster Rovers, making him a free agent.

=== Loan spells ===
The 2013–14 season saw Bennett have his playing time restricted at Doncaster Rovers and joined Crawley Town on a one-month loan deal on 25 October 2013. Bennett was previously on the verge of joining Notts County on loan, but the move was rejected. Bennett made his Crawley Town debut the next day, in a 2–0 loss against Stevenage. Following his debut, Manager Paul Dickov made hints that Bennett could stay at the club for another month. Instead, Bennett returned to his parent club after making six appearances.

On 24 January 2014, Bennett joined Bradford City on loan until the end of the season. He made his debut four days later, and was sent off in the 25th minute after clashing with Neil Kilkenny in a 0–0 draw at home to Preston North End. He scored his first goal for the club on 11 March, in a 2–0 win away against Colchester United. At the end of the 2013–14 season, Bennett scored once in eighteen appearances for the club. Bennett said his loan spell at Bradford City helped him with good experience, as well as, helping him grow up.

=== Portsmouth ===
On 21 May 2015, Bennett signed for Portsmouth on a two-year contract, becoming Paul Cook's first signing as manager. Manager Dickov felt Bennett was badly advised to his move to Portsmouth.

On 8 August 2015 Kyle made his Portsmouth debut at home to Dagenham & Redbridge, scoring twice and assisting Gareth Evans before being substituted to a standing ovation by the Pompey fans.

On 16 May 2017 Bennett signed a new three-year contract at Portsmouth keeping him at the club until 2020. In August 2017 he reached the milestone of 100 appearances for Portsmouth.

On 31 January 2018, Bennett left Portsmouth by mutual consent.

=== Bristol Rovers ===
On 1 February 2018, Bennett joined Bristol Rovers on a free transfer after leaving Portsmouth. He made his debut on 3 February, replacing Ollie Clarke in the 56th minute of a 2–1 defeat to Shrewsbury Town. He made his first start a week later and scored the equaliser in a 2–1 comeback victory against Oxford United.

Having struggled for first team opportunities during the 2019–20 season Bennett was rumoured to be told by manager Ben Garner that he was free to leave the club and he was later not given a shirt number for the upcoming season.

On 31 January 2019, Bennett joined Swindon Town on loan until the end of the 2018–19 season. Bennett made his Swindon debut on 12 February in a 2–0 home victory over Forest Green Rovers, coming off of the bench in the 81 minute of the match. Bennett's next appearance was his first start, playing 85 minutes of a 1–1 home draw with Grimsby Town on 23 February. He scored his first goal for the club the following week in a 3–0 victory over Colchester United and would go on to score another three goals before the season ended as Swindon secured a mid-table finish.

On 8 October 2020, Bennett joined Grimsby Town on loan for the 2020–21 season.

At the end of the 2020–21 season, it was announced that Bennett would be leaving the club upon the expiration of his contract.

=== Non-league ===
On 17 July, Bennett played for Notts County on trial and scored a goal in a 2–0 friendly victory over Coalville Town. On 27 July, manager Ian Burchnall stated that Bennett would not be joining the club due to recent signings of other players in his position, he did state that Bennett would continue to train with County until he finds a new club.

Following a trial with Notts County, on 12 August 2021 Bennett joined his hometown side AFC Telford United of the National League North. On 7 January 2022, it was announced that Bennett had left the club.

On 7 January 2022, Bennett signed for Southern League Premier Division Central side Hednesford Town. He made his debut the following day in a 3–3 draw with Needham Market.

On 14 February 2023, Bennett signed for fellow Southern League Premier Division Central side Stratford Town.

On 16 June 2023, Bennett signed for Midland League Premier Division club Shifnal Town.

== Playing style ==
Bennett is an attacking midfielder "known for his blistering pace and close ball control ".

== Personal life ==
He is the younger brother of footballer Elliott Bennett.

In January 2025, Bennett revealed how his off-the-pitch struggles had affected him mentally whilst at Bristol Rovers as he went through a divorce and caring for his terminally ill father, who died in October 2021.

== Career statistics ==
As of match played 26 December 2021

Appearances and goals by club, season and competition
Club	Season	League			FA Cup		League Cup		Other		Total	
Club	Season	Division	Apps	Goals	Apps	Goals	Apps	Goals	Apps	Goals	Apps	Goals
Bury	2010–11	League One	32	2	1	0	0	0	2 (Note: Appearance(s) in Football League Trophy)	0	35	2
Doncaster Rovers	2011–12	Championship	36	4	1	0	2	1	—		39	5
Doncaster Rovers	2012–13	League One	35	3	0	0	2	0	1	0	38	3
Doncaster Rovers	2013–14	Championship	3	0	1	0	0	0	—		4	0
Doncaster Rovers	2014–15	League One	42	8	4	0	3	0	1	0	50	8
Doncaster Rovers	Total		121	15	6	0	7	1	2	0	136	16
Crawley Town (loan)	2013–14	League One	4	0	—		—		—		4	0
Bradford City (loan)	2013–14	League One	18	1	—		—		—		18	1
Portsmouth	2015–16	League Two	42	6	5	1	2	0	2 (Note: Appearances in League Two play-offs)	0	44	6
Portsmouth	2016–17	League Two	39	6	1	0	1	0	3 (Note: Appearances in EFL Trophy)	0	44	6
Portsmouth	2017–18	League One	18	0	1	0	1	0	2	0	22	0
Portsmouth	Total		99	12	7	1	4	0	7	0	117	13
Bristol Rovers	2017–18	League One	17	3	—		—		—		17	3
Bristol Rovers	2018–19	League One	19	0	2	0	2	1	3	0	26	1
Bristol Rovers	2019–20	League One	12	0	2	0	1	0	4	0	19	0
Bristol Rovers	2020–21	League One	0	0	0	0	0	0	0	0	0	0
Bristol Rovers	Total		48	3	4	0	3	1	7	0	62	4
Swindon Town (loan)	2018–19	League Two	15	4	—		—		—		15	4
Grimsby Town (loan)	2020–21	League Two	13	0	1	0	0	0	1	0	15	0
AFC Telford United	2021–22	National League North	13	0	0	0	—		2 (Note: Appearance(s) in FA Trophy)	0	15	0
Career total			357	37	19	1	14	2	21	0	411	40

== Honours ==
Doncaster Rovers

- Football League One: 2012–13

Portsmouth

- EFL League Two: 2016–17
