= Liam Wakefield =

English footballer

Personal information
- Full name: Liam Wakefield
- Date of birth: 9 April 1994 (age 32)
- Place of birth: Doncaster, England
- Position: Right-back

Youth career
- –2012: Doncaster Rovers

Senior career*
Years	Team	Apps	(Gls)
2012–2015	Doncaster Rovers	10	(1)
2012	→ Bradford Park Avenue (loan)	4	(0)
2015–2016	Accrington Stanley	12	(0)
2016–2017	Morecambe	25	(0)
2017	Boston United	4	(0)
- * Club domestic league appearances and goals as of 12:20, 20 November 2017 (UTC)

Liam Wakefield (born 9 April 1994) is an English footballer who plays as a right-back most recently for Boston United.

== Playing career ==
=== Doncaster Rovers ===
Born in Doncaster, England, Wakefield was part of the Youth Alliance Cup winning Rovers team in 2012 who won 4–0 over Exeter City at Exeter and signed his first professional contract prior to the tournament.

Wakefield made his first appearance coming on as a sub in extra time in a first round League Cup game against York City on 11 August 2012 at the Keepmoat Stadium. A week later, he went on loan to Bradford Park Avenue. After making four league appearances, and one in the FA Cup qualifier against Curzon Ashton, he returned to his parent club in October. Whilst he only made 2 cup appearances for Doncaster in 2012–13, Wakefield was seen as a good prospect and given another years contract till the end of the 2013–14 season. Wakefiled also reflect his first season at the club as a professional footballer.

In the 2013–14 season, Wakefield made his first League appearance coming on as sub for Paul Quinn in the 67th minute at Pride Park in a 3–1 defeat to Derby County. With Bongani Khumalo being injured and Paul Quinn moving to central defence, Wakefield had his first start, as right-back, in a 0–3 home defeat to Ipswich Town. In an FA Cup game against Stevenage on 5 January 2014, he scored his first goal, chipping the keeper in the last minute of extra time as Rovers were defeated 2–3. Although the club were relegated back to League One, Wakefield was offered a new contract with the club.

In the 2014–15 season, Wakefield signed a contract extension for another year, with an option for another year. Weeks later on 26 August 2015, Wakefield scored his first goal of the season, in a 2-1 shock win over Watford in the second round of the League Cup. At the end of the 2014–15 season, Wakefield went on to make ten appearances and scoring once in all competitions and was offered a new contract. However, Wakefield left the club after rejecting a six-month contract offered by the club, as well as, regaining his fitness after he suffered ruptured ankle ligaments which ended his season early.

=== Accrington Stanley ===
Despite being rumoured of going on trial at Walsall, Wakefield signed for Accrington Stanley on a six-month contract until January on 7 August 2015.

Wakefield made his Accrington Stanley on 15 August 2015, where he made his first start as a right-back position, in a 1–0 loss against Morecambe in the opening game of the season. Having made seven appearances, he signed a contract with the club in January, which lasted until the end of the season. However, Wakefield suffered injuries and spent most of the season on the substitute bench, restricting his appearances to fourteen this season.

At the end of the 2015–16 season, Wakefield was released by the club.

=== Morecambe ===
After spending a year with Accringston Stanley, Wakefield signed for Morecambe on a one-year contract on 28 June 2016. Upon joining the club, Wakefield was given number two shirt ahead of the new season.

Wakefield made his Morecambe debut, where he made his first start and played the whole game, in a 2–0 loss against Grimsby Town in the opening game of the season. Since making his debut, Wakefield since to established himself in the back four in the first team under the management of Jim Bentley. Wakefield was released by Morecambe on 18 May having not been in Jim Bentley's plans for much of the season.

=== Boston United ===
In September 2017, he joined Boston United.

== Career statistics ==
As of match played 16 December 2017

Appearances and goals by club, season and competition
Club	Season	League			FA Cup		League Cup		Other		Total	
Club	Season	Division	Apps	Goals	Apps	Goals	Apps	Goals	Apps	Goals	Apps	Goals
Doncaster Rovers	2012–13	League One	0	0	—		1	0	1 (Note: Appearances in Football League Trophy)	0	2	0
Doncaster Rovers	2013–14	Championship	4	0	1	1	0	0	—		5	1
Doncaster Rovers	2014–15	League One	6	0	0	0	3	1	1	0	10	1
Doncaster Rovers	Total		10	0	1	1	4	1	2	0	17	2
Bradford Park Avenue (loan)	2012–13	Conference North	4	0	1	0	—		0	0	5	0
Accrington Stanley	2015–16	League Two	12	0	0	0	1	0	1	0	14	0
Morecambe	2016–17	League Two	25	0	0	0	2	0	2 (Note: Appearances in the EFL Trophy)	0	29	0
Boston United	2017–18	National League North	4	0	2	0	—		0	0	6	0
Career total			55	0	4	1	7	1	5	0	71	2
