= Reece Wabara =

English footballer (born 1991)

Personal information
- Full name: Reece Wabara
- Date of birth: 28 December 1991 (age 34)
- Place of birth: Bromsgrove, Worcestershire, England
- Height: 6 ft 0 in (1.82 m)
- Position: Defender

Youth career
- Walsall
- 2007–2011: Manchester City

Senior career*
Years	Team	Apps	(Gls)
2011–2014	Manchester City	1	(0)
2011–2012	→ Ipswich Town (loan)	6	(0)
2012–2013	→ Oldham Athletic (loan)	25	(0)
2013	→ Blackpool (loan)	1	(0)
2013	→ Doncaster Rovers (loan)	13	(0)
2014–2015	Doncaster Rovers	43	(1)
2015–2016	Barnsley	19	(1)
2016	Wigan Athletic	19	(1)
2017	Bolton Wanderers	1	(0)
Total		128	(3)

International career
2011	England U19	1	(0)
2011	England U20	5	(0)
- * Club domestic league appearances and goals

Reece Wabara (born 28 December 1991) is an English businessman and former professional footballer who played as a defender. He is also a former England U20 international.

== Club career ==
=== Manchester City ===
Reece was a central defender and full back who signed for Manchester City's academy from Walsall's School of Excellence in 2007. In May 2008, Reece signed his first professional scholarship with the club.

Wabara began his City career playing in the academy and eventually become captain of under-16s side, before moving on to becoming a mainstay in the Elite Development Squad. He committed his long-term future to the Blues by signing a three-year deal in March 2011 worth an estimated one million pounds. After given number fifty seven shirt, Wabara made his first team debut on the last day of the 2010–11 season against Bolton Wanderers when he came on as a substitute for Pablo Zabaleta.

He left Manchester City on 14 April 2014, after having his contract cancelled by mutual consent.

=== Loan spells ===
In September 2011, Wabara joined Championship club Ipswich Town on a three-month loan and made three substitute appearances before making his first appearance in the starting eleven on 5 November 2011, in which he played the full game, his side losing 2–3 to bottom of the table visitors Doncaster Rovers. Despite being keen for a loan extension at Ipswich Town, Wabara returned to his parent club.

On 15 September 2012, Wabara joined Football League One side Oldham Athletic on a one-month loan deal. Later in the day, Wabara made his Oldham Athletic debut, playing as a right-back, in a 2–2 draw against Notts County. His performance in a number of games soon led Manager Paul Dickov to comment about Wabara's impact at Oldham and he said he was keen to extend his loan spell. Wabara had his loan spell with the club extended for another month on 18 October 2012. Wabara's loan spell with the club was then extended further until January. Wabara then scored his first Oldham Athletic goal, in the second round of the FA Cup, in a 3–1 win over Doncaster Rovers on 1 December 2012. Wabara's loan spell with Oldham Athletic was extended further until 27 January 2013. He made his last appearance for Oldham in the 3–2 FA Cup victory over Liverpool, scoring the winning goal. Despite this his loan spell came to an end, the club's assistant manager David Platt said Wabara could make a return to Oldham Athletic.

Instead, on 30 January 2013, Wabara joined Blackpool on a loan move until the end of the 2012–13 season. Wabara made his Blackpool debut, in a 1–0 loss against Ipswich Town on 16 February 2013. Wabara made only one appearance and made his return to his parent club on 7 March 2013 after Blackpool decided to cut his loan spell.

=== Doncaster Rovers ===
Wabara joined Championship side Doncaster Rovers on a one-month loan on 6 August 2013. Wabara made his Doncaster Rovers debut in the first round of the League Cup, in a 1–0 win over Rochdale and made his league debut, playing as a right-back, in a 2–0 win over Blackburn Rovers. After an impressive first month, Wabara extended his loan move until January 2014. However, on 3 December 2013, he returned to Manchester City after suffering a stress reaction to the injury.

Following his release by Manchester City, Wabara rejoined Doncaster Rovers on a permanent deal signing a short-term contract on 1 August 2014. Upon joining the club, Wabara was given the number twenty-two shirt, compared to his previous number 32. Wabara's first game after signing for the club on a permanent basis came in the opening game of the season, playing as a right-back, in a 3–0 win over Yeovil Town. Wabara scored his first Doncaster Rovers goal, in a 2–1 win over Bradford City on 1 November 2014. Wabara established himself in the first team in the first half of the season and his twenty-seven appearances led to him earning a contract with the club until the end of the 2014–15 season. Wabara continued to establish himself in the first team as a right-back until Mitchell Lund took over his role. Despite making forty-three appearances, Wabara was released by the club when his contract expired in the summer. Manager Dickov explained that Wabara's contract was not extended because he wanted to seek new challenges.

=== Barnsley ===
After being released by Doncaster Rovers, Wabara went on trial at Scottish Championship side Rangers. He was reportedly close to signing for Rangers, but on 15 August 2015 that Wabara joined Barnsley on a short-term contract until 31 December 2015.

Wabara made his Barnsley debut on 18 August 2015, where he came on as a substitute for James Bree in the 58th minute, in a 3–2 win over Millwall. Then 12 September 2015, he scored his first goal for the club in a 4–1 win over Swindon Town. Despite serving a suspension after picking five yellow cards this season, Wabara became a first team regular at Barnsley and made nineteen appearances for the club.

With his contract at Barnsley expiring, Wabara was offered a new contract by the club. By the time his contract was expiring, Wabara made his last Barnsley appearance on 2 January 2016, in a 2–1 win over Millwall. However, Wabara left the club after his six months contract expired.

=== Wigan Athletic ===
After impressing whilst at Barnsley on a short-term contract, Wabara was signed by League 1 rivals Wigan Athletic on 14 January 2016 until the end of the 2015–16 season on a free transfer.

Wabara made his Wigan Athletic debut, making his first start, against Chesterfield on 16 January 2016 and provided assist for Reece James to score the second goal in the game, in a 3–1 win. In the next game on 23 January 2016, Wabara scored his first goal for Wigan in a 1–1 draw at Crewe Alexandra. Wabara became a first team regular at Wigan Athletic, playing in the left-back position for the rest of the season. As a result, Wabara's attitude was praised by Manager Gary Caldwell. Whilst at Wigan Athletic, Wabara played 20 games and earned Promotion to The Championship after winning League 1. For his impressive form for both Barnsley and Wigan over the 2015–16 season, Wabara was named in League One's PFA Team of the Year for his performances in the 2015–16 season, alongside teammates Craig Morgan, Yanic Wildschut and Will Grigg.

Despite impressing for Wigan Athletic, Wabara, however, was released by the club at the end of the 2015–16 season. Manager Caldwell explained his decision to release Wabara, though his decision was describe as "biggest". After leaving Wigan Athletic, Wabara trialled with Leeds United and Bristol City. Wabara was all set to join Leeds United, but the contract offer was later withdrawn after Manager Garry Monk decided against signing him.

=== Bolton Wanderers ===
On 15 February 2017, Bolton completed the signing of Wabara until the end of the season. On 11 May the club confirmed that Wabara would be leaving at the end of his contract on 30 June. After leaving Bolton, Wabara retired to focus on his fashion brand.

== International career ==
Wabara is eligible to represent both England and Nigeria as he has a Nigerian grandfather, but chose to represent England international as the country of his birth at youth level. In May 2008, Wabara was called up by England U17.

Reece made his England U20 debut in a 1–0 defeat to France U20 in February 2011. He was then named in Brian Eastick's squad for the FIFA U20 World Cup in Colombia in the summer of 2011.

== Business career ==
Wabara is the CEO of the clothing brand Manière De Voir, which he founded in 2013. The business was ranked as one of the fastest-growing private companies in Britain in 2022 and 2023, with annual revenue of £34.7 million and profits doubling from the previous year to £6.6 million. He was ranked 19th on the 2023 Sunday Times Young Rich List with a net worth of £83million. Ironically, this makes him wealthier than every active Premier League footballer, a career he retired from at the age of 26. Manière De Voir expanded its physical retail presence by opening a flagship store at 354 Oxford Street, London, in December 2023, coinciding with the brand's 10th anniversary. As of 2025, Manière De Voir has expanded to 4 stores worldwide.

In August 2024, Reece Wabara paid £9.4 million to buy out the stake in his company owned by a childhood friend.

== Personal life ==
Reece's grandfather, Lawrence Wabara, was a Nigerian international footballer. and is the nephew of former Rangers player Mark Walters and boxer Pelé Reid. Wabara attended South Bromsgrove High School.

== Career statistics ==
As of 28 February 2017.

Appearances and goals by club, season and competition
Club	Season	League			FA Cup		League Cup		Other		Total	
Club	Season	Division	Apps	Goals	Apps	Goals	Apps	Goals	Apps	Goals	Apps	Goals
Manchester City	2010–11	Premier League	1	0	0	0	0	0	0	0	1	0
Manchester City	2011–12	Premier League	0	0	0	0	0	0	0	0	0	0
Manchester City	2012–13	Premier League	0	0	0	0	0	0	0	0	0	0
Manchester City	2013–14	Premier League	0	0	0	0	0	0	0	0	0	0
Manchester City	Total		1	0	0	0	0	0	0	0	1	0
Ipswich Town (loan)	2011–12	Championship	6	0	0	0	0	0	0	0	6	0
Oldham Athletic (loan)	2012–13	League One	25	0	4	2	0	0	0	0	29	2
Blackpool (loan)	2012–13	Championship	1	0	0	0	0	0	0	0	1	0
Doncaster Rovers (loan)	2013–14	Championship	13	0	0	0	2	0	0	0	15	0
Doncaster Rovers	2014–15	League One	43	1	4	0	2	0	1 (Note: Appearance(s) in Football League Trophy)	0	50	1
Doncaster Rovers	Total		56	1	4	0	4	0	1	0	65	1
Barnsley	2015–16	League One	19	1	1	0	1	0	5	0	26	1
Wigan Athletic	2015–16	League One	19	1	0	0	0	0	0	0	19	1
Bolton Wanderers	2016–17	League One	1	0	0	0	0	0	0	0	1	0
Career total			128	3	9	2	5	0	6	0	148	5

== Honours ==
Wigan Athletic

- Football League One: 2015–16

Individual

- PFA Team of the Year: 2015–16 League One
