= Luke McCullough =

Northern Irish footballer

Personal information
- Full name: Luke McCullough
- Date of birth: 15 February 1994 (age 32)
- Place of birth: Portadown, Northern Ireland
- Positions: Centre-back; defensive midfielder

Team information
- Current team: Carrick Rangers
- Number: 12

Youth career
- Loughgall Youth
- ?–2010: Dungannon Swifts
- 2010–2012: Manchester United

Senior career*
Years	Team	Apps	(Gls)
2012–2013	Manchester United	0	(0)
2013	→ Cheltenham Town (loan)	1	(0)
2013–2019	Doncaster Rovers	99	(0)
2018–2019	→ Tranmere Rovers (loan)	36	(0)
2020	Tranmere Rovers	6	(0)
2020–2024	Glentoran	98	(3)
2024-	Carrick Rangers	74	(4)

International career^{‡}
	Northern Ireland U16	5	(0)
	Northern Ireland U17	10	(1)
2012	Northern Ireland U19	1	(0)
	Northern Ireland U20	2	(1)
2013–2015	Northern Ireland U21	8	(0)
2014–2018	Northern Ireland	6	(0)
- * Club domestic league appearances and goals as of 29 April 2026 ‡ National team caps and goals as of 20:48, 5 September 2022 (UTC)

Luke McCullough (born 15 February 1994) is a Northern Irish footballer who plays as a centre-back or defensive midfielder for Carrick Rangers in the NIFL Premiership.

== Club career ==
McCullough started his career with his local team, Loughgall Youth, before joining Dungannon Swifts where he played in the first team in the IFA Premiership at the age of 15.

=== Manchester United ===
He moved to England to play for Manchester United in July 2010. He captained the academy side throughout the 2011–12 campaign, making 25 appearances. On 25 January 2013, he joined Football League Two side Cheltenham Town on a one-month loan deal. He made his league debut on 16 February 2013, in a 1–1 draw with Aldershot Town, coming on as a substitute for Steve Elliott.

=== Doncaster Rovers ===
After spending time on trial during pre-season, McCullough signed a two-year deal with Doncaster Rovers on 25 July 2013. He made his debut for Doncaster when he started in Rovers' 3–1 defeat to Brighton & Hove Albion in the Championship on 2 November 2013.

On 23 July 2016, McCullough signed a new three-year contract. However, less than a month later, on 2 August 2016, it was announced that McCullough would miss the entire season with a cruciate ligament injury.

He was released by Doncaster at the end of the 2018–19 season after spending much of it on loan at Tranmere Rovers.

=== Tranmere Rovers ===
McCullough re-signed for Tranmere on no-contract terms on 6 January 2020. The deal was made permanent 24 days later.

=== Glentoran ===
McCullough returned to his native Northern Ireland on 1 August 2020, by signing for East Belfast side, Glentoran. On 7 May 2024, it was announced that McCullough would be one of ten players departing Glentoran upon the expiry of their contracts.

== International career ==
McCullough first represented Northern Ireland at under-16 level where he became captain. He was also captain of the under-17s. Although named in the squad twice before, his first appearance for the under-19s was a start in the 8–1 victory away to Moldova on 15 October 2012. Although he didn't score in that game, he was credited with two assists.

On the same day he signed a contract with Doncaster Rovers, he also received a call-up to play for the under-21 squad in the Milk Cup.

McCullough senior debut came in a friendly loss against Uruguay. McCullough has since become a regular feature of the Northern Irish squad, going to Euro 2016. He did not make an appearance at the tournament.

== Personal life ==
McCullough is a Rangers fan. His father, Dean McCullough, was also a footballer who played for Glenavon and Portadown. His brother, Neil McCullough, plays for Linfield with whom he won the Irish Premiership in 2025.

== Career statistics ==
=== Club ===
As of match played 25 October 2025

Appearances and goals by club, season and competition
Club	Season	League			National cup (Note: Includes FA Cup and Irish Cup)		League cup (Note: Includes Football League Cup and Northern Ireland Football League Cup)		Continental		Other		Total	
Club	Season	Division	Apps	Goals	Apps	Goals	Apps	Goals	Apps	Goals	Apps	Goals	Apps	Goals
Manchester United	2012–13	Premier League	0	0	0	0	0	0	0	0	—		0	0
Cheltenham Town (loan)	2012–13	League Two	1	0	—		—		—		0	0	1	0
Doncaster Rovers	2013–14	Championship	14	0	1	0	0	0	—		—		15	0
Doncaster Rovers	2014–15	League One	33	0	4	1	3	0	—		1 (Note: Appearance(s) in Football League Trophy)	0	41	1
Doncaster Rovers	2015–16	League One	32	0	1	0	2	0	—		0	0	35	0
Doncaster Rovers	2016–17	League Two	7	0	0	0	0	0	—		0	0	7	0
Doncaster Rovers	2017–18	League One	13	0	0	0	0	0	—		0	0	13	0
Doncaster Rovers	2018–19	League One	0	0	0	0	1	0	—		0	0	1	0
Doncaster Rovers	Total		99	0	6	1	6	0	—		1	0	112	1
Tranmere Rovers (loan)	2018–19	League Two	36	0	1	0	0	0	—		0	0	37	0
Tranmere Rovers	2019–20	League One	6	0	0	0	—		—		1	0	7	0
Glentoran	2020–21	NIFL Premiership	6	0	0	0	—		1 (Note: Appearance(s) in UEFA Europa League)	0	—		7	0
Glentoran	2021–22	NIFL Premiership	13	1	0	0	1	0	2 (Note: Appearance(s) in UEFA Europa Conference League)	0	—		16	1
Glentoran	2022–23	NIFL Premiership	27	2	1	0	2	0	—		—		30	2
Glentoran	2023–24	NIFL Premiership	26	1	2	0	0	0	2	0	—		30	1
Glentoran	Total		72	4	3	0	3	0	5	0	—		83	4
Carrick Rangers	2024–25	NIFL Premiership	34	1	3	2	0	0	—		2 (Note: Appearance(s) in NIFL Premiership play-offs)	0	39	3
Carrick Rangers	2025–26	NIFL Premiership	12	1	0	0	0	0	—		—		12	1
Carrick Rangers	Total		46	2	3	2	0	0	—		2	0	51	4
Career total			260	6	13	3	9	0	5	0	4	0	291	9

=== International ===
Appearances and goals by national team and year
National team	Year	Apps	Goals
Northern Ireland	2014	3	0
Northern Ireland	2015	2	0
Northern Ireland	2018	1	0
Total		6	0
