= Alex Peterson =

English footballer (born 1994)

Personal information
- Full name: Alex Peterson
- Date of birth: 17 October 1994 (age 32)
- Place of birth: Doncaster, England
- Height: 6 ft 0 in (1.83 m)
- Position: Centre forward

Team information
- Current team: Bridlington Town

Youth career
- 2006–2013: Doncaster Rovers

Senior career*
Years	Team	Apps	(Gls)
2013–2015	Doncaster Rovers	6	(0)
2014	→ Barnet (loan)	1	(0)
2014–2015	→ Scarborough Athletic (loan)	?	(?)
2015–2016	Scarborough Athletic	0	(0)
- Ossett Town
2018–2022	Belper Town		
2022	Sheffield	4	(1)
2022–2024	Ossett United	54	(15)
2024	Hallam		
2024–	Bridlington Town	1	(0)
- * Club domestic league appearances and goals as of 13:46, 9 November 2024 (UTC)

Alex Peterson (born 17 October 1994) is an English footballer who plays as a centre forward for Northern Premier League Division One East club Bridlington Town.

== Club career ==
=== Doncaster Rovers ===
Peterson was with Doncaster Rovers since the age of 11, coming through the club's Centre of Excellence and having made progress throughout the youth ranks, Peterson signed a one-year professional contract with the club on 1 July 2013 Peterson later stated in the club's official interview about being a professional.

Peterson soon made his debut for the first team away at Charlton Athletic on 26 November 2013, replacing midfielder Marc de Val in the 76th minute as Rovers attempted to get something from the game. He first made the starting eleven in the following month in a 0–0 draw at home against Millwall on 29 December 2013. After making his first start, Peterson expressed his satisfaction.

On 18 March 2014, Peterson joined Conference side Barnet on loan for the remainder of the 2013–14 season. He played 90 minutes in a 2–0 loss at Macclesfield Town the same day, but this was the only appearance he made before his loan spell was cut short on 16 April.

Upon returning to Doncaster Rovers, Peterson signed a new 12-month contract with the club. After signing a new contract, Peterson was determined to make a breakthrough in the first team. However, Peterson only made one league appearance against Walsall, coming on as a substitute in the 66th minute on 27 September 2014.

Peterson joined Scarborough Athletic on loan in November 2014. By some accounts he had a successful spell there, before his loan was cut short and he returned to Doncaster.

At the end of the 2014–15 season, Peterson was released by the club.

=== Non-league football ===
After his release by Doncaster Rovers Peterson returned to Scarborough Athletic following his loan spell. He was unveiled by the club following a friendly match against Hull United on 11 July 2015.

In October 2022, Peterson joined Sheffield. The following month, he joined Ossett United, reuniting with manager Grant Black whom had managed Peterson at Ossett Town.

On 27 May 2024, Peterson joined Northern Counties East Premier Division side Hallam. He departed the club in October 2024.

On 3 November 2024, having made his debut the previous day, Bridlington Town announced the signing of Peterson.
