= Paul Keegan (footballer, born 1984) =

Irish footballer

Personal information
- Full name: Paul Anthony Keegan
- Date of birth: 5 July 1984 (age 42)
- Place of birth: Dublin, Ireland
- Height: 1.80 m (5 ft 11 in)
- Position: Midfielder

Youth career
- Home Farm
- Leeds United

Senior career*
Years	Team	Apps	(Gls)
2000–2005	Leeds United	0	(0)
2003–2004	→ Scunthorpe United (loan)	2	(0)
2005–2008	Drogheda United	93	(6)
2009–2010	Bohemians	66	(6)
2011–2017	Doncaster Rovers	116	(2)
2017–2018	Waterford	40	(1)
2019–2020	Bray Wanderers	39	(2)

International career
2000	Republic of Ireland U16	2	(0)
2003	Republic of Ireland U21	5	(0)
2007–2008	Republic of Ireland U23	3	(0)
2010	League of Ireland XI	1	(0)
- * Club domestic league appearances and goals as of 22:41, 6 November 2019 (UTC)

Paul Anthony Keegan (born 5 July 1984) is an Irish professional footballer who last played for Bray Wanderers. He plays as a midfielder. He is a former Republic of Ireland U23 international.

== Club career ==
=== Early career ===
Keegan was born in Dublin and grew up in Castleknock. He played youth football at Home Farm before joining Leeds United as a 16-year-old - he chose to join Leeds United due to the high number of Irish players already at the club. Keegan failed due break into the first team whilst at Leeds, partly due to suffering a calf injury. He also had a loan at Scunthorpe United. He was released by Leeds in summer 2005, amidst financial difficulties and a year on from their relegation from the Premier League.

=== Drogheda United ===
Keegan signed for Drogheda United in July 2005 on a two-year contract. At Drogheda he earned two senior medals, the first arriving when the Louth side won the FAI Cup in 2005, and two years later when they claimed the league championship, the first in the club's history.

=== Bohemians ===
After leaving Drogheda, Keegan signed for Bohemians in January 2009 and slotted seamlessly into his favourite position of central midfield. His status at the club rapidly grew to such an extent that he captained the side when Owen Heary was absent. He claimed his first silverware for Bohs in the 2008/2009 season when they won the League of Ireland Cup, beating Waterford United 3–1 at the RSC. The success didn't end there though as Bohs subsequently won the first back-to-back titles in their 119-year history.

During the 2010 season, Keegan was named captain for a League of Ireland XI that would play Manchester United in a friendly match at the newly opened Aviva Stadium. He was also named PFAI Chairman in November 2010 replacing Stephen Rice in the position. At the end of the 2010 season, with his future at Bohs in doubt due to financial difficulties at the club, he spent time on trial at Reading and Doncaster Rovers.

=== Doncaster Rovers ===
After impressing on trial at Doncaster Rovers, Keegan signed for the club on 17 January 2011, on a contract until the end of the season. In May 2012, Keegan was released by the club after the expiry of his contract. However, in an about turn by the club, on 17 July 2012, Keegan signed a new one-year deal with the South Yorkshire club.

Following a successful season, and playing in pre-season friendlies, he signed another one-year deal on 25 July 2013. Keegan had a solid beginning to the season with 13 consecutive starts in League games after missing the first match, and then he picked up a hamstring injury preventing him training until January.

On 28 August 2014, Keegan signed a new three-year contract with Doncaster.

=== Waterford ===
In July 2017 Keegan signed for the League of Ireland First Division league leaders Waterford. Just one day after signing Keegan scored his first goal for the club and it proved to be a crucial one as Waterford beat Longford Town 1–0 which kept them in the driving seat for the title. After Waterford beat Wexford 3–0 and Cobh Ramblers were defeated 3–0 by Cabinteely Waterford were officially crowned league champions and promoted back to the League of Ireland Premier Division. Keegan finished the season with 10 appearances and 1 goal to his name as Waterford won promotion.

Just after Waterford had won the league Keegan confirmed he would stay on at Waterford for the 2018 season as they returned to the League of Ireland Premier Division for the first time in ten years. It was confirmed one week before the 2018 season that Keegan was appointed the new captain of Waterford.

=== Bray Wanderers ===
In December 2018 Keegan signed for First Division side Bray Wanderers. Keegan made his debut for Bray in their opening match of the 2019 season away to Cabinteely. A week later he scored his first goal for Bray in a 2–0 home win over Limerick. Keegan finished his first season with Bray with 26 appearances, scoring 3 goals. In November 2019 Paul signed a new contract to keep him at Bray until the end of the 2020 season.

== International career ==
He has captained the Republic of Ireland at youth and U21 level making his debut in Stade de la Maladière in 2003. He also played at Under 23 level. In October 2000, Keegan played for the Republic of Ireland national football team U16s in a qualifying tournament in Riga for the 2001 UEFA European Under-16 Football Championship where he came up against Andrés Iniesta.

== Honours ==
Drogheda United

- FAI Cup: 2005
- Setanta Sports Cup: 2006, 2007
- League of Ireland Premier Division: 2007

Bohemians

- League of Ireland Premier Division: 2009
- League of Ireland Cup: 2009
- Setanta Sports Cup: 2010

Doncaster Rovers

- Football League One: 2012–13

Waterford

- League of Ireland First Division: 2017
