= Marc de Val =

Spanish footballer

Personal information
- Full name: Marc de Val Fernández
- Date of birth: 15 February 1990 (age 36)
- Place of birth: Blanes, Spain
- Height: 1.80 m (5 ft 11 in)
- Position: Midfielder

Team information
- Current team: Peña Deportiva
- Number: 6

Youth career
- 2000–2009: Espanyol

Senior career*
Years	Team	Apps	(Gls)
2009–2012	Real Madrid C	43	(0)
2012	→ Olot (loan)	5	(0)
2012–2013	Olímpic Xàtiva	36	(1)
2013–2015	Doncaster Rovers	16	(0)
2015	Córdoba B	15	(0)
2015–2016	Sabadell	5	(0)
2016–2017	Terrassa	30	(1)
2017–	Peña Deportiva	12	(0)
- * Club domestic league appearances and goals as of 9 November 2017

Marc de Val Fernández (born 15 February 1990) is a Spanish professional footballer who plays for SCR Peña Deportiva as a central midfielder.

== Club career ==
=== Spain ===
Born in Blanes, Girona, Catalonia, de Val joined RCD Espanyol's youth setup in 2000, aged ten. He featured regularly in the club's youth setup, appearing with the Juvenil squad in the 2008–09 campaign.

In the 2009 summer de Val moved to Real Madrid, being assigned to the C-team in Tercera División. He appeared in 23 matches during his first season, and in further 20 in his second.

On 27 January 2012, after making no appearances in the campaign, de Val was loaned to fellow league team UE Olot until June. He appeared sparingly before returning to the Blancos in the summer.

In July 2012 De Val joined Segunda División B's CD Olímpic de Xàtiva. He made his debut for the club on 26 August, starting in a 0–0 away draw against CD Binissalem.

De Val scored his first senior goal on 17 March 2013, netting the game's only in a 1–0 home win against Ontinyent CF. He contributed with 37 appearances as his side narrowly missed out the play-offs.

=== Doncaster Rovers ===
On 24 June 2013 de Val moved abroad for the first time in his career, after agreeing to a two-year deal with English Football League Championship side Doncaster Rovers, managed by Paul Dickov. Dickov had tried to sign him two years previously whilst managing Oldham Athletic but at that time the compensation fee was too much.

In July, de Val picked up a knee injury during a pre-season friendly against Motherwell, and was sidelined until late October. On 22 November he played his first match as a professional, coming on as a late substitute for Federico Macheda in a 2–0 home win against Yeovil Town.

De Val was handed his first start four days later, in a 0–2 away loss against Charlton Athletic, but appeared in only five league matches during the campaign. On 27 January 2015 he left Rovers by mutual consent.

=== Back to Spain ===
Hours after leaving Doncaster, de Val returned to Spain and joined Córdoba CF, being assigned to the B-team in the third division. On 14 July 2015, de Val moved to fellow league team CE Sabadell FC.

On 23 September 2016, de Val joined Terrassa FC in the fourth level.
