= 1995 in the United Kingdom =

Events from the year 1995 in the United Kingdom.

== Incumbents ==
- Monarch – Elizabeth II
- Prime Minister – John Major (Conservative)

== Events ==
=== January ===
- 1 January
  - Fred West, the 53-year-old Gloucester builder charged with killing twelve women and children (including two of his own daughters), is found to have hanged himself in his cell at Winson Green Prison, Birmingham. He was due to go on trial this year, along with his 41-year-old wife Rosemary, who is charged with ten murders.
  - South Korean industrial giant Daewoo announces plans to build a new car factory in the United Kingdom within the next few years, costing up to £350,000,000 and creating new jobs.
- 10 January – The British football transfer fee record is broken when Manchester United sign striker Andy Cole from Newcastle United in a deal valued at £7million.
- 20 January – The first MORI poll of 1995 shows that the Conservative Party have cut Labour's lead in the polls from 39 points to 29.
- 25 January – Footballer Eric Cantona, the French international forward, assaults a spectator after being sent off while playing for Manchester United against Crystal Palace in the FA Premier League.
- 27 January – Manchester United fine Eric Cantona £20,000 and announce that he will not play for the first team for the rest of the current football season. Cantona also faces assault charges, with a police investigation pending.

=== February ===
- 1 February – New domestic electrical appliances must be supplied with an appropriately fused pre-wired plug.
- 2 February – Tennis legend Fred Perry dies aged 85 in hospital in Melbourne, Australia, following a fall.
- 7 February – Rumbelows, the electrical goods retailer and former sponsors of the Football League Cup, closes its 311 stores with the loss of more than 3,000 jobs.
- 14 February – Sizewell B nuclear power station, the UK's only commercial pressurised water reactor power station, is first synchronised with the National Grid.
- 15 February
  - The manufacturing sector has reported its biggest rise in employment since the Conservatives first came to power sixteen years earlier, although the national unemployment rate rose slightly in January, still being in excess 2.5 million – it has not been below this level for more than three years.
  - The England football team's friendly match against the Republic of Ireland in Dublin is abandoned due to the behaviour of a small number of English fans, believed to be members of far-right activist groups.
- 16 February – Neil Kinnock, former Leader of the Labour Party, resigns from Parliament after twenty-five years to take up a new role as a European Commissioner, sparking a by-election in his Islwyn constituency in South Wales. Don Touhig retains the seat for Labour, with nearly 70% of the vote.
- 17 February – The famous MG sports car brand, not seen on a volume sports car since 1980, is revived when the Rover Group announces the new MGF sports car which will go on sale in September this year.
- 19 February – Sir Nicholas Fairbairn, the Conservative MP for Perth and Kinross, dies in office aged 61.
- 21 February – George Graham, who has won six major trophies including two league titles since becoming manager of Arsenal F.C. in 1986, is sacked over allegations that he accepted illegal payments from an agent when signing two players in 1992.
- 24 February – The Football Association bans Eric Cantona from football for eight months, meaning that he will not be able to play competitively until after 30 September, and fine him £10,000.
- 26 February – Barings Bank, the UK's oldest merchant bank, collapses following $1,400,000,000 of losses by rogue trader, Nick Leeson.
- 28 February – The Diary of Bridget Jones column first published in The Independent.

=== March ===
- 9 March – Elizabeth II and Prince Philip, Duke of Edinburgh visit Northern Ireland for the first time since the IRA and Loyalist ceasefire which came into force last year.
- 20 March – The Queen arrives in Cape Town for the first royal visit to South Africa in nearly fifty years, following the first elections under universal suffrage there, which took place last year.
- 23 March – French Manchester United footballer Eric Cantona is sentenced to fourteen days imprisonment at Croydon Crown Court for his assault on a Crystal Palace fan two months ago. He remains free on bail pending an appeal against his sentence, but if this is unsuccessful he will be the first footballer to be jailed in Britain for an on-field offence. 39-year-old former Scotland winger Davie Cooper dies aged 39 after suffering a brain haemorrhage.
- 31 March – Eric Cantona wins his appeal against his prison sentence, which is reduced to a 120-hour community service order.

=== April ===
- 1 April – South Korean carmaker Daewoo begins selling cars in the United Kingdom. It offers a two-model range, the Nexia and Espero, updated versions of the previous generation Vauxhall Astra and Vauxhall Cavalier.
- 8 April – British-born American national Nicholas Ingram, 31, is executed in Georgia for a murder committed in 1983.
- 16 April – PhONEday changes all telephone area dialing codes UK-wide.

=== May ===
- 4 May – The Conservative government's fortunes continue to decline as the local council elections see them in control of a mere eight councils, while Labour control 155 councils and the Liberal Democrats control 45. The Conservatives now have control of no councils in Wales or Scotland.
- 8 May – The fiftieth anniversary of VE Day is celebrated across Britain.
- 14 May – Blackburn Rovers become FA Premier League champions, earning them their first top division league title since 1914.
- 19 May – Geoffrey Dickens, the Conservative MP for Littleborough and Saddleworth, dies in office aged 63.
- 20 May – Everton win the FA Cup with a 1–0 win over Manchester United at Wembley Stadium.
- 21 May – United Kingdom BSE outbreak: First known death from variant Creutzfeldt–Jakob disease, that of a 19-year-old man; not until 20 March 1996 does the Secretary of State for Health announce that vCJD is caused by eating beef infected with bovine spongiform encephalopathy.
- 24 May – Former Prime Minister Harold Wilson dies of cancer in London, aged 79. On 6 June his funeral takes place at St Mary's Old Church, St Mary's on the Isles of Scilly, where he is laid to rest.
- 25 May – Roseanna Cunningham wins the Perth by-election for the Scottish National Party, three months after the seat became vacant upon the death of the Conservative MP Sir Nicholas Fairbairn. The Conservative majority has now fallen from 21 seats to 11, in the space of three years since the last general election.

=== June ===
- 9 June – Andrew Richards, a 26-year-old serial sex offender of West Glamorgan, becomes the first person to be convicted of male rape under the Criminal Justice and Public Order Act 1994.
- 14 June – Pauline Clare is appointed as Chief Constable of Lancashire Constabulary, becoming the first woman to hold the office of Chief Constable.
- 20 June – Arsenal pay a British record fee of £7.5million for Inter Milan and Holland striker Dennis Bergkamp.
- 22 June – In an attempt to reassert his authority, John Major resigns as leader of the Conservative Party (but not as Prime Minister) triggering a leadership election.
- 23 June – The latest MORI opinion poll shows that Conservative support has reached an 18-month high of 32%, but Labour still have a 22-point lead over them.
- 28 June–22 August – 1995 Great Britain and Ireland heat wave: The driest summer in recorded English meteorological history, with an average EWP series of only 66.9 millimetres (2.63 in), and also the third-hottest with an average Central England temperature of 17.30 °C (63.14 °F).

=== July ===
- 3 July
  - The British football transfer record fee is broken for the third time this year when Liverpool sign striker Stan Collymore from Nottingham Forest for £8.5million.
  - Experimental launch of Mondex stored-value card in Swindon.
- 4 July – John Major wins the Conservative Party leadership election, gaining 218 votes to John Redwood's 89.
- 13 July – A memorial service is held for Harold Wilson in Westminster Abbey, attended by Prince Charles, John Major, and three other living former Prime Ministers.
- 19 July
  - Pensions Act 1995 receives Royal Assent, proposing to phase in a state pension age for women at 65 (equalising it with that for men) over a ten-year period and introducing measures intended to safeguard occupational pension schemes.
  - Unemployment is reported to be on the rise again, though the government denies that it is pointing towards another recession.
- 23 July – War in Bosnia and Herzegovina: British forces sent to Sarajevo to help relieve the Siege of Sarajevo.
- 27 July – The Conservative government's majority is slashed further, to nine seats, as the Liberal Democrats win the Littleborough and Saddleworth seat in Lancashire, two months after it was left vacant by the death of Conservative MP Geoffrey Dickens.
- 30 July – A murder investigation is launched after two teenage boys, Robbie Gee and Paul Barker, are found dead near a lake in rural Cheshire. Police in North Wales begin a murder hunt after the body of seven-year-old Sophie Hook is found washed up on a beach near the Llandudno home of her grandparents, shortly after she disappeared while sleeping in a tent in the garden.
- The Radio Authority gives permission to GWR Group to begin programme networking across many of its FM stations. This landmark ruling begins the move by commercial radio companies in the UK to replace locally produced shows with networking.

=== August ===
- 3 August – 30-year-old Colwyn Bay man Howard Hughes is charged with the murder of Sophie Hook, and remanded in custody.
- 6 August – Pubs in England are permitted to remain open throughout Sunday afternoon for the first time.
- 16 August – Unemployment is now at 2,315,300 – one of the lowest figures recorded in the last four years.
- 20 August – BAPS Shri Swaminarayan Mandir London, Europe's first traditional-style purpose-built Hindu temple (and England's largest), is inaugurated in Neasden.
- 26 August – Middlesbrough F.C. move into their new 30,000-seat Riverside Stadium, to replace Ayresome Park which had been their home since 1903. Their new stadium is the largest club stadium to be built in England since the 1920s.

=== September ===
- 2 September – Boxer Frank Bruno wins the WBC world heavyweight championship.
- 27 September – The BBC begins regular Digital Audio Broadcasting, from the Crystal Palace transmitting station.

=== October ===
- 2 October – Manchester band Oasis release their 2nd studio album (What's the Story) Morning Glory? which proves to be one of the most successful of all time.
- 7 October – Conservative MP Alan Howarth defects to Labour, cutting the government's majority to seven seats.
- 9 October – Former Prime Minister Sir Alec Douglas-Home dies aged 92 at his home in Coldstream in the Scottish Borders.
- 16 October – Julie Goodyear, who joined the ITV soap opera Coronation Street as iconic character Bet Lynch in 1966 and had been a regular cast member since 1970, departs from the show.
- 18 October – Unemployment drops below 2.3 million for the first time since 1991.
- 20 October – Vauxhall unveils its new Vectra range of large family hatchbacks and saloons. The Vectra, which replaces the long-running Cavalier, will be built in Luton and from next year will also be sold as an estate.
- 22 October – Brilliant!, an exhibition by the Young British Artists group (who also feature heavily in this year's British Art Show), opens at the Walker Art Center, Minneapolis, USA.
- 25 October – Singer Cliff Richard receives a knighthood.
- 31 October – The Duke of Northumberland dies aged 42 of a heart attack caused by drug abuse. He is succeeded by his younger brother.

=== November ===
- 16 November –
  - Queen Elizabeth The Queen Mother, 95, has a hip replacement operation. She is believed to be the oldest patient to undergo such surgery.
  - Essex teenager Leah Betts dies in hospital four days after slipping into a coma due to taking an ecstasy tablet whilst drinking large amounts of water, sparking a media crusade, backed by Leah's father and stepmother, against the drug and those supplying it.
- 17 November
  - Launch of the European Space Agency's Infrared Space Observatory including a Long Wave Spectrometer built in the UK.
  - The Today newspaper is discontinued after nine years in circulation.
- 20 November – "An Interview with HRH The Princess of Wales" an episode of Panorama, is broadcast on BBC One in which Diana, Princess of Wales, is interviewed by Martin Bashir. She discusses her adultery, depression and bulimia, her children, the media and the future of the monarchy in candid detail. An estimated 22.78 million watch the broadcast, the all-time record for a UK current affairs programme.
- 22 November – Rose West is found guilty of murdering ten women and children, including her 16-year-old daughter Heather and seven-year-old stepdaughter Charmaine, after a trial at Winchester Crown Court. She is sentenced to life imprisonment with a recommendation that she is never released. Her husband Fred, who committed suicide on remand at the start of the year, is believed to have committed at least 12 murders since the mid-1960s.
- 24 November – The spy James Bond returns to U.K. cinemas six years after Licence to Kill, for the seventeenth film GoldenEye, with Irish actor Pierce Brosnan playing the part of Bond, filmed at the newly created Leavesden Studios.
- 28 November – Budget: Chancellor Kenneth Clarke cuts the basic level of income tax to 24p in the pound.
- 30 November – President of the United States Bill Clinton visits Northern Ireland.

=== December ===
- 2 December – "Rogue trader" Nick Leeson is jailed for six-and-a-half years in Singapore on a double fraud charge relating to the recent financial collapse of Barings Bank.
- 8 December – Head teacher Philip Lawrence dies after being stabbed at the entrance of his school in Maida Vale, North London, where he was defending a pupil from a local teenage gang.
- 10 December – Joseph Rotblat wins the Nobel Peace Prize.
- 13 December – A riot takes place in Brixton, London.
- 20 December – The Queen writes to the Prince and Princess of Wales (Charles and Diana) three years after their separation, urging them to divorce as soon as possible.
- 29 December – The Conservative majority now stands at a mere five seats following the defection of MP Emma Nicholson to the Liberal Democrats.
- 30 December – Altnaharra in the Scottish Highlands matches the lowest temperature UK Weather Record at −27.2 °C (−17.0 °F).

=== Undated ===
- Contingent fee litigation permitted in the Courts of England and Wales.
- 1% of the UK population (some 600,000 people) now have internet access.

== Publications ==
- Martin Amis's novel The Information.
- Iain Banks' novel Whit.
- Pat Barker's novel The Ghost Road.
- Nick Hornby's novel High Fidelity.
- Terry Pratchett's Discworld novel Maskerade.
- Philip Pullman's novel Northern Lights, first in the His Dark Materials trilogy.
- Delia Smith's cookery Winter Collection.
- Barry Unsworth's novel Morality Play.

== Births ==
=== January ===
- January – Kane Haysman, footballer
- 1 January – Adam Campbell, footballer
- 5 January – Tom John, footballer
- 4 January – Adam Webster, footballer
- 7 January – Jessica Judd, runner
- 8 January
  - Kyle Edmund, South Africa-born tennis player
  - Stephen Hendrie, footballer
  - Romello Nangle, footballer
- 13 January
  - Steven Brisbane, footballer
  - Eros Vlahos, actor
- 16 January – Sam Long, footballer
- 18 January – Tommy O'Sullivan, footballer
- 20 January – Calum Chambers, footballer
- 23 January – Clifford Newby-Harris, footballer
- 25 January – Joel Logan, footballer
- 26 January – Lewis Small, footballer
- 28 January – Mimi-Isabella Cesar, rhythmic gymnast
- 29 January – Germain Burton, cyclist
- 30 January – Jack Laugher, diver

=== February ===
- 1 February – Richard Wisker, actor
- 2 February – Paul Digby, footballer
- 6 February
  - Jasper Johns, footballer
  - Jack Shore, mixed martial artist
- 7 February
  - Ashleigh Butler, dog trainer
  - Tom Glynn-Carney, actor
- 10 February – Harry Finch, cricketer
- 11 February – Luke Humphries, darts player
- 12 February – Reece Hales, footballer
- 13 February
  - Alex Mowatt, footballer
  - Connor Waldon, footballer
  - Craig Watson, footballer
- 18 February
  - Mitchell Oxborrow, footballer
  - Kimberley Reed, athlete
- 19 February
  - Ryan Finnie, footballer
  - Dylan McLaughlin, footballer
- 23 February – Rory Elrick, actor
- 24 February – Jacob Murphy, footballer
- 26 February – Liam Fairhurst, charity fundraiser (died 2009)

=== March ===
- 1 March – Danny Mullen, footballer
- 2 March – Joe Hanks, footballer
- 4 March – Bill Milner, actor
- 12 March – Forrayah Bass, footballer
- 20 March – Harry Lee, footballer
- 22 March – Dafydd Howells, rugby union player
- 27 March – Olivia Fergusson, footballer
- 29 March – Joshua Sinclair-Evans, actor
- 30 March – Tao Geoghegan Hart, road racing cyclist

=== April ===
- 9 April – Coll Donaldson, footballer
- 11 April – Siobhan Cattigan, rugby union player (died 2021)
- 12 April – Harry Middleton, footballer
- 14 April – Alan Frizzell, footballer
- 15 April – Nick Awford, footballer
- 16 April
  - Poppy Lee Friar, actress
  - Josh Meade, footballer
  - Ross M. Stewart, footballer
- 17 April – Will Hughes, footballer
- 21 April – Josh Adams, rugby union player
- 23 April
  - Callum O'Dowda, footballer
  - Kelly Simm, gymnast
- 25 April – Lewis Hornby, footballer
- 30 April – Drey Wright, footballer

=== May ===
- 4 May – Alex Lawther, actor
- 5 May – Gen Kitchen, politician
- 9 May – Beth Mead, footballer
- 14 May – Fox Jackson-Keen, actor, dancer and singer
- 18 May – Craig Sibbald, footballer
- 20 May – Brandon Zibaka, footballer
- 24 May – Prince Joseph Wenzel of Liechtenstein
- 25 May – Jamie Allen, footballer
- 30 May – Jonah Hauer-King, actor

=== June ===
- June – Arran Fernandez, mathematician
- 1 June – Charlotte Jordan, actor
- 5 June
  - Beckii Cruel, dancer and singer
  - Ross Wilson, tennis player
- 8 June
  - Bessie Cursons, actress
  - Tom Grennan, singer
- 12 June – Hannah Starling, diver
- 16 June
  - Jake Dennis, racing driver
  - Oliver Lines, snooker player
- 17 June – Richie Fallows, squash player
- 20 June – Behzinga, YouTuber
- 22 June – Jack Lynch, footballer
- 23 June – Lauren Aquilina, singer–songwriter
- 29 June – Tyler Harvey, footballer
- 30 June – Declan John, footballer

=== July ===
- 5 July – Baily Cargill, footballer
- 7 July – Cameron Dawson, footballer
- 9 July – Georgie Henley, actress
- 12 July – Luke Shaw, footballer
- 15 July
  - Matt Grimes, footballer
  - Joseph N'Guessan, footballer
- 16 July – Kortney Hause, footballer
- 23 July – Faryl Smith, singer
- 26 July
  - Holly Bodimeade, actress
  - Darren Petrie, footballer
- 28 July – Ben Watton, actor

=== August ===
- 2 August – Vikkstar123, YouTuber
- 4 August – Chris Sutherland, footballer
- 5 August – Leo Chambers, footballer
- 11 August – Ben Davies, footballer
- 17 August – Alex Skeel, football coach and domestic violence survivor
- 22 August – Dua Lipa, singer and songwriter
- 23 August – Cameron Norrie, tennis player
- 24 August
  - Cammy Smith, Scottish footballer
  - Lady Amelia Windsor, fashion model and royal
- 29 August – Shaquille Hunter, footballer
- 31 August – Ceallach Spellman, actor

=== September ===
- 1 September – Dannielle Khan, cyclist
- 5 September – Dominic Sibley, cricketer
- 7 September – George Williams, footballer
- 10 September – Jack Grealish, footballer
- 13 September – Robbie Kay, actor
- 20 September
  - Kirsty Howard, charity fundraiser (died 2015)
  - Rob Holding, footballer
- 24 September – Conor McGrandles, footballer
- 26 September
  - Chloe Burrows, media personality
  - Hayley Jones, racing cyclist
- 27 September – Ryan Haynes, footballer
- 30 September – Harry Stott, actor

=== October ===
- 5 October – Diego De Girolamo, footballer
- 7 October – Dion Charles, footballer
- 12 October – Jordan Howe, athlete
- 28 October – Wesley Burns, footballer

=== November ===
- 1 November – Nick D'Aloisio, Australia-born entrepreneur, computer programmer and designer
- 6 November – Bradley Tarbuck, footballer
- 9 November – Finn Cole, actor
- 13 November – Lucy Fallon, actress
- 16 November – Rolando Aarons, footballer
- 22 November – Declan McDaid, footballer
- 28 November
  - Emily Benham, mountain bike orienteering champion
  - Libby Rees, author
- 29 November – Siobhan-Marie O'Connor, swimmer

=== December ===
- 2 December – Kalvin Phillips, footballer
- 4 December – Dina Asher-Smith, sprinter
- 7 December – Jaanai Gordon, footballer
- 8 December – Jordon Ibe, footballer
- 12 December – Mark O'Hara, footballer
- 16 December – Ryan Gauld, footballer
- 19 December – Elliot Evans, singer
- 27 December – Laurence Belcher, actor
- 30 December – Ollie Watkins, footballer

=== Full date unknown ===
- Tex Jacks, actor
- Joshua Pascoe, actor

== Deaths ==
=== January ===
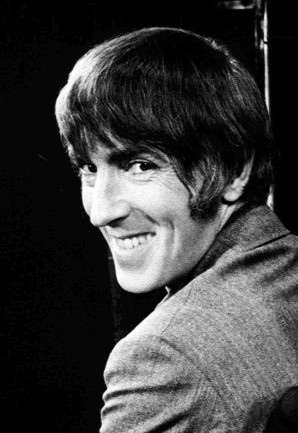
Peter Cook

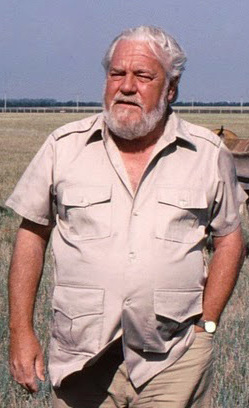
Gerald Durrell

- 1 January – Fred West, serial killer (born 1941) (suicide by hanging while in custody)
- 2 January – Henry Graham Sharp, figure skater (born 1917)
- 4 January – Robert Latham, editor and scholar (born 1912)
- 5 January – Somerset de Chair, author, politician and poet (born 1911)
- 7 January
  - Harry Golombek, chess grandmaster (born 1911)
  - Larry Grayson, comedian and gameshow host (born 1923)
- 9 January – Peter Cook, comedy actor, satirist, writer and comedian (born 1937)
- 11 January
  - John Gere, art historian (born 1921)
  - Peter Pratt, opera singer (born 1923)
- 13 January
  - Richard Causton, businessman and author on Buddhism (born 1920)
  - David Looker, bobsledder (born 1913)
  - Mervyn Stockwood, clergyman and former Bishop of Southwark (born 1913)
- 14 January
  - Mark Finch, cinema promoter (born 1961); suicide
  - Sir Alexander Gibson, conductor (born 1926)
  - Stafford Somerfield, newspaper editor (born 1911)
- 17 January – Evadne Baker, actress (born 1937, South Africa)
- 18 January – Joseph Kagan, Baron Kagan, industrialist (born 1915, Russian Empire)
- 19 January – John Pearson, 3rd Viscount Cowdray, peer and polo player (born 1910)
- 21 January – Kenneth Budd, mural artist (born 1925)
- 22 January
  - Stuart Davies, aerospace engineer (born 1908)
  - Christopher Palmer, composer (born 1946)
- 26 January
  - Louis Heren, journalist (born 1919)
  - Alaric Jacob, writer and journalist (born 1909)
- 29 January – Dickie Burnell, rower (born 1917)
- 30 January – Gerald Durrell, naturalist, zookeeper, author and television presenter (born 1925 in British India)

=== February ===
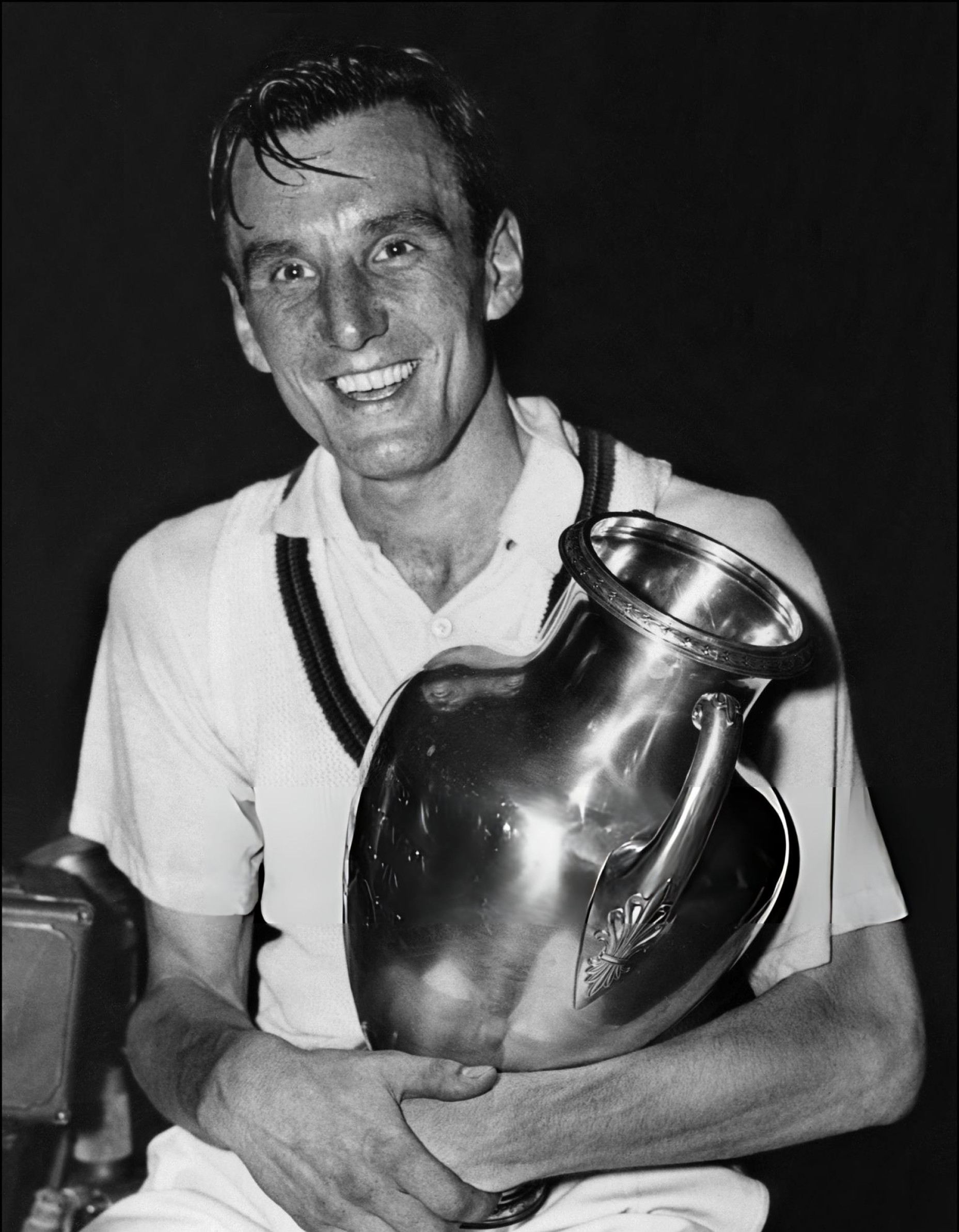
Fred Perry

- 1 February – Jill Phipps, animal rights activist (born 1964); crushed by lorry
- 2 February
  - David Kindersley, typeface designer (born 1915)
  - Fred Perry, tennis player and three times Wimbledon champion (born 1909)
  - Donald Pleasence, actor (born 1919)
- 4 February
  - David Alexander, singer (born 1938)
  - Godfrey Brown, Olympic athlete (born 1915)
- 5 February
  - Jimmy Allen, footballer and football manager (born 1909)
  - Frank Costin, automotive engineer (born 1920)
  - Frederick Riddle, violist (born 1912)
- 7 February – Helen Wallis, map curator at the British Museum (born 1924)
- 8 February – Rachel Thomas, Welsh actress (born 1909)
- 12 February – Robert Bolt, writer (born 1924)
- 14 February
  - Roger de Grey, artist and president of the Royal Academy (1984–1993) (born 1918)
  - Nigel Finch, film director and filmmaker (born 1949)
- 15 February
  - Seymour Berry, 2nd Viscount Camrose, peer, politician and newspaper proprietor (born 1909)
  - Francis Taylor, Baron Taylor of Hadfield, businessman, founder of Taylor Woodrow (born 1905)
- 17 February – Thelma Hulbert, artist (born 1913)
- 18 February – Denny Cordell, record producer (born 1943)
- 19 February – Nicholas Fairbairn, Scottish politician (born 1933)
- 22 February – Nicholas Pennell, actor (born 1938)
- 23 February
  - James Herriot, veterinary surgeon and writer (born 1916)
  - Norman Hunter, writer (born 1899)
- 25 February – Terence Weil, cellist (born 1921)
- 26 February – Jack Clayton, film director (born 1921)
- 28 February – Walter Allen, literary critic and novelist (born 1911)

=== March ===
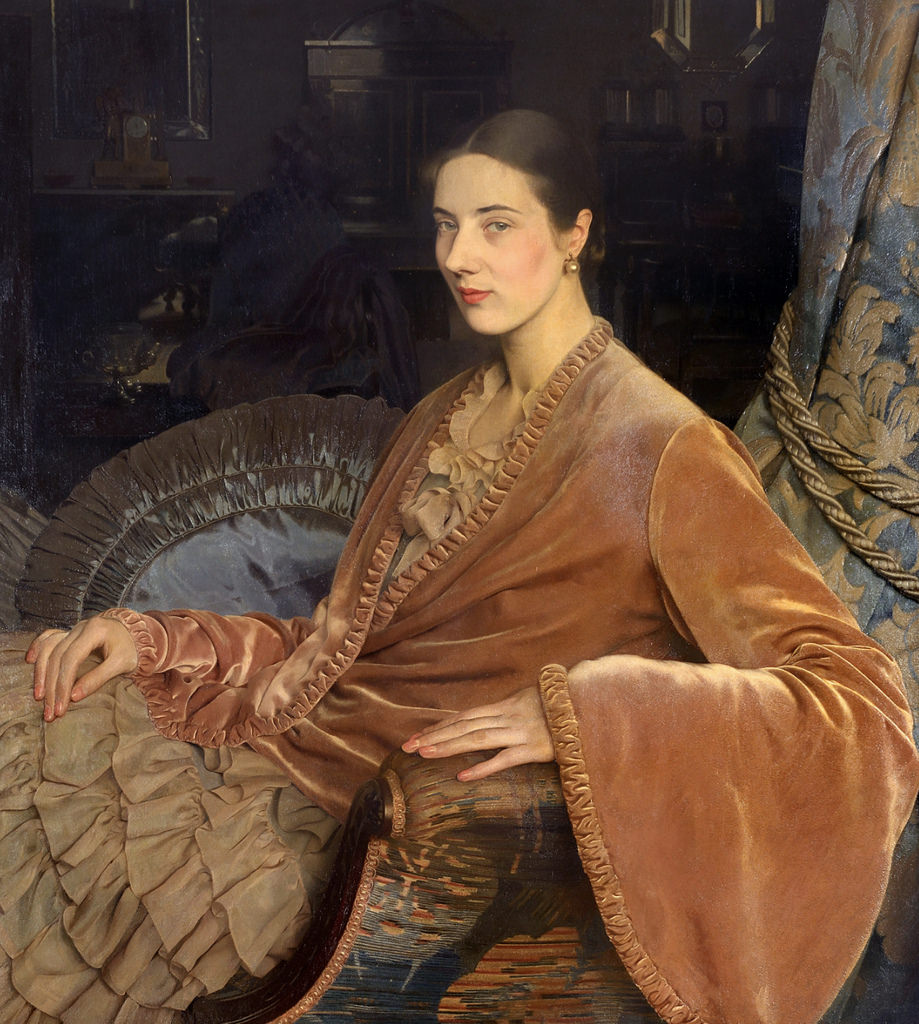
Marguerite Kelsey

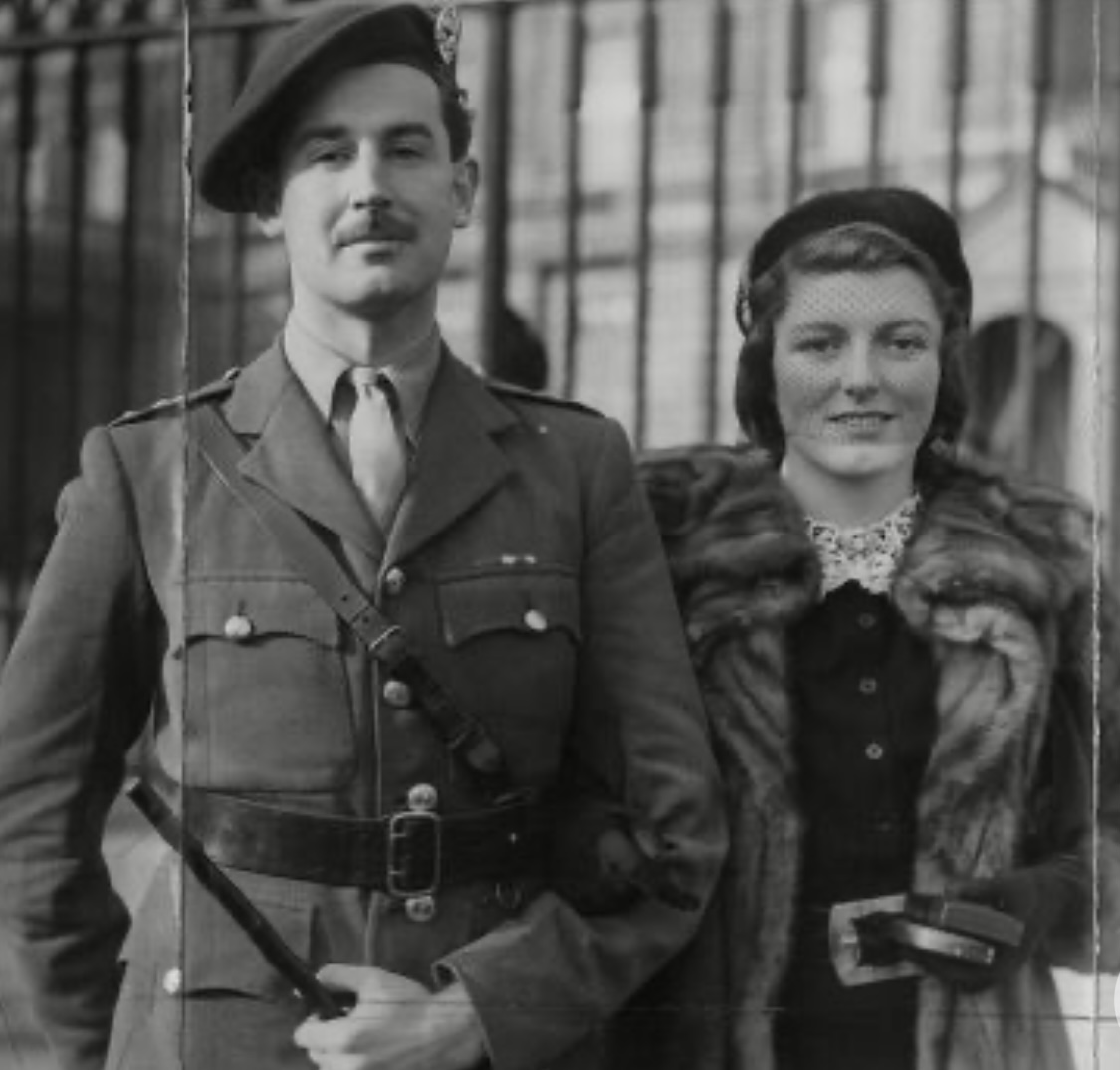
Simon Fraser, 15th Lord Lovat and his wife

- 2 March – Vivian MacKerrell, actor (born 1944)
- 5 March
  - Marguerite Kelsey, artist's model (born 1909)
  - Vivian Stanshall, singer-songwriter, musician and poet (born 1943); accidentally killed
- 7 March – Ivan Craig, Scottish actor (born 1912)
- 11 March
  - James Scott-Hopkins, politician (born 1921)
  - Myfanwy Talog, Welsh actress (born 1944)
- 15 March – Fred Mulley, politician, lawyer and economist (born 1918)
- 16 March – Simon Fraser, 15th Lord Lovat, Scottish peer and World War II Commando (born 1911)
- 17 March
  - Donald Baverstock, television producer (born 1924)
  - Ronnie Kray, jailed crime leader (born 1933)
- 18 March – Hugh Kelsey, writer on bridge (born 1926)
- 20 March – Sir James Kilfedder, Northern Irish politician (born 1928)
- 21 March – Robert Urquhart, actor (born 1922)
- 22 March – Peter Woods, journalist (born 1930)
- 23 March
  - Alan Barton, singer (Black Lace) (born 1953); accidentally killed
  - Davie Cooper, footballer (born 1956)
- 24 March – Joseph Needham, biochemist, science historian and sinologist (born 1900)
- 25 March
  - James Gardner, designer (born 1907)
  - Stuart Milner-Barry, chess player and World War II codebreaker (born 1906)
- 29 March – John Terry, film financier (born 1913)

=== April ===
- 1 April – Dame Lucie Rie, ceramicist (born 1902, Austria-Hungary)
- 3 April – David Herbert, socialite and writer (born 1908)
- 4 April
  - Richard Adrian, 2nd Baron Adrian, peer and psychologist (born 1927)
  - Kenny Everett, comic broadcast presenter (born 1944) (AIDS-related)
- 6 April – Trevor Park, lecturer and politician (born 1927)
- 7 April
  - Peter Brinson, writer and lecturer on dance (born 1920)
  - Nicholas Ingram, first British citizen to be executed by the electric chair in the United States (born c. 1964)
- 10 April – Glyn Jones, Welsh writer (born 1905)
- 12 April
  - Constance Heaven, romance writer (born 1911)
  - Chris Pyne, jazz trombonist, brother of Mick Pyne (born 1939)
- 14 April – Michael Fordham, psychologist (born 1909)
- 16 April – Arthur English, actor and comedian (born 1919)
- 19 April – Neil Paterson, author (born 1915)
- 20 April – Bob Wyatt, former cricketer (born 1901)
- 21 April – Tessie O'Shea, singer and actress (born 1913)
- 26 April
  - Hugh Morton, Baron Morton of Shuna, lawyer and politician (born 1930)
  - Peter Wright, scientist and MI5 intelligence officer (born 1916)
- 27 April – Albert Brown, cricketer and snooker player (born 1911)
- 28 April – Walter Tracy, type designer, typographer and writer (born 1914)
- 30 April – Michael Graham Cox, actor (born 1938)

=== May ===
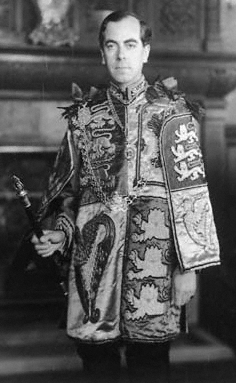
Sir Anthony Wagner

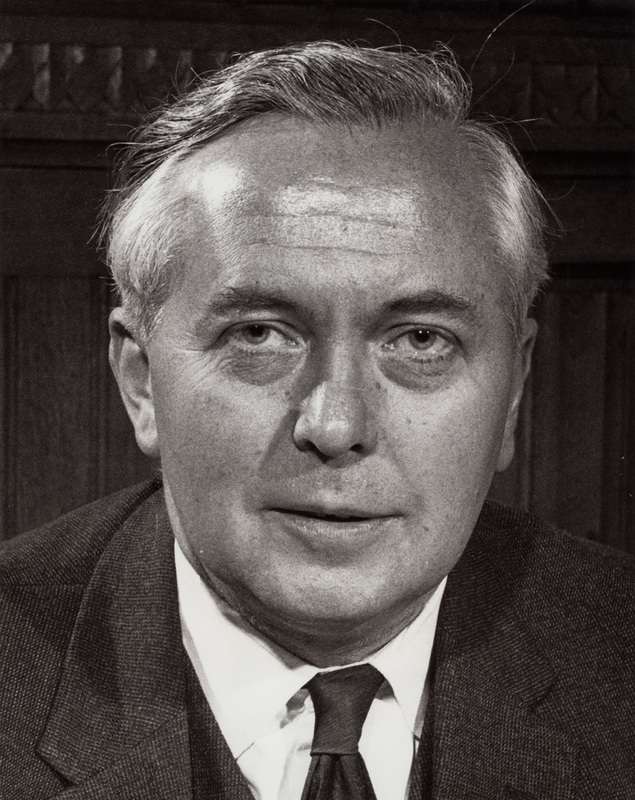
Harold Wilson

- 2 May – Sir Michael Hordern, actor (born 1911)
- 5 May
  - Alastair Pilkington, engineer and businessman, inventor of the float glass process (born 1920)
  - Sir Anthony Wagner, herald and Clarenceux King of Arms (born 1908)
- 7 May
  - Katharine Banham, psychologist (born 1897)
  - Ray Buckton, trade unionist (born 1922)
- 10 May – Harold Berens, actor and comedian (born 1903)
- 11 May – John Phillips, actor (born 1914)
- 12 May – Arnold Goodman, Baron Goodman, lawyer and political advisor (born 1913)
- 14 May – Jessy Blackburn, aviation pioneer (born 1894)
- 15 May – Eric Porter, actor (born 1928)
- 16 May – Raymond Lyttleton, mathematician and theoretical astronomer (born 1911)
- 17 May – Geoffrey Dickens, politician (born 1931)
- 18 May – Robert Harris, actor (born 1900)
- 22 May – Robert Flemyng, actor (born 1912)
- 23 May
  - Mick Pyne, jazz pianist, brother of Chris Pyne (born 1940)
  - Geoffrey Waldegrave, 12th Earl Waldegrave, peer (born 1905)
- 24 May – Harold Wilson, politician, Prime Minister (1964–70 & 1974–76) (born 1916)
- 25 May – Jack Allen, actor (born 1907)
- 28 May
  - Helen Ballard, horticulturalist (born 1908)
  - Jean Muir, fashion designer (born 1928)
- 29 May – Sir Archibald Russell, aerospace engineer (born 1904)
- 30 May
  - Ted Drake, footballer and football manager (born 1912)
  - Lofty England, engineer and motor company manager (born 1911)
  - Philip Sherrard, author and translator (born 1922)
- 31 May – Roy Beddington, painter, illustrator, poet, writer on fishing, and journalist (born 1910)

=== June ===
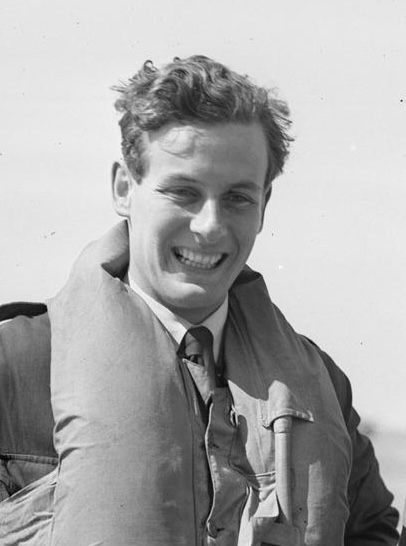
Peter Townsend

- 1 June – Colin Ronan, author and science historian (born 1920)
- 3 June – Dilys Powell, film critic and travel writer (born 1901)
- 9 June – Frank Chacksfield, musician and orchestral conductor (born 1914)
- 10 June – Bruno Lawrence, British-born New Zealand actor (born 1941)
- 15 June – Charles Bennett, screenwriter (born 1899)
- 17 June – David Ennals, Baron Ennals, politician and human rights activist (born 1922)
- 18 June – Arthur Howard, actor (born 1910)
- 19 June
  - Murray Dickie, opera singer (born 1924)
  - Richard Pape, writer and World War II escapee (born 1916)
  - Peter Townsend, RAF officer and lover of Princess Margaret (born 1914)
- 21 June – Tristan Jones, sailor and author (born 1929)
- 26 June – Edgar Williams, Army officer and historian (born 1912)
- 28 June – Donald Sinclair, veterinary surgeon (born 1911); suicide
- 29 June – Noel Dyson, actress (born 1916)

=== July ===
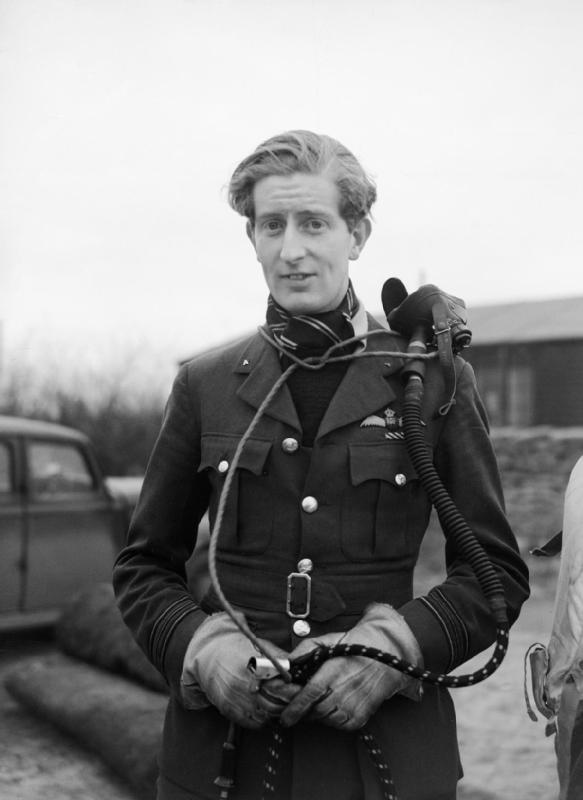
Sir Hugh Dundas

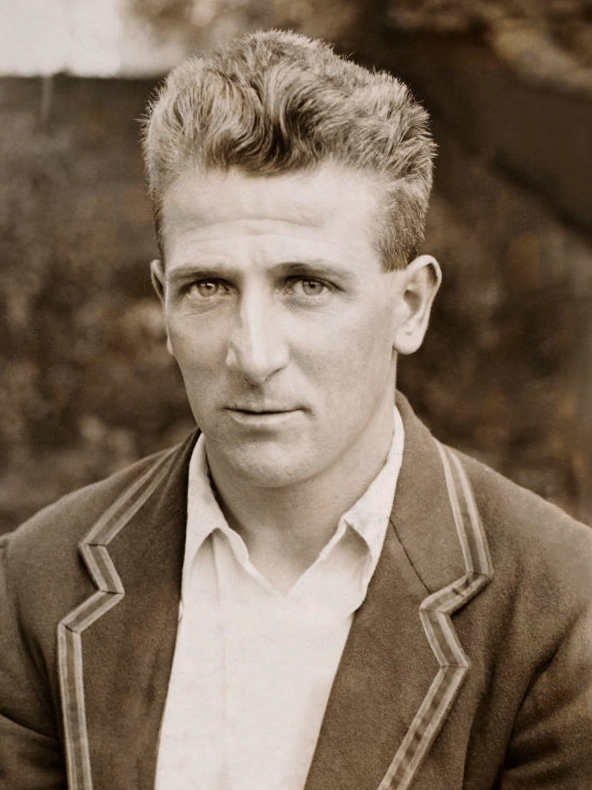
Harold Larwood

- 2 July
  - Gervase Jackson-Stops, architectural historian and journalist (born 1947)
  - Geraint Morgan, lawyer and politician (born 1920)
- 3 July – Bert Hardy, photographer (born 1913)
- 7 July – Geoffrey Freeman Allen, railway writer (born 1922)
- 8 July – Dorothy Stanley-Turner, racing driver (born 1916)
- 9 July – Vera Thomas, table tennis player (born 1920)
- 10 July – Sir Hugh Dundas, World War II fighter pilot and television executive (born 1920)
- 12 July
  - Michael Clegg, naturalist and television presenter (born 1933)
  - Gordon Flemyng, television and film director (born 1934)
  - Sean Mayes, pianist and writer (born 1945)
  - John Yudkin, psychologist and nutritionist (born 1910)
- 13 July
  - Sir Varyl Begg, Royal Navy admiral (born 1908)
  - Peter Morrison, politician (born 1944)
- 16 July – Stephen Spender, poet and writer (born 1909)
- 19 July
  - Michael Andrews, artist (born 1928)
  - Sydney Lipton, dance band leader (born 1906)
- 21 July – Elleston Trevor, novelist and playwright (born 1920)
- 22 July
  - Daniel Dixon, 2nd Baron Glentoran, Northern Irish soldier and politician (born 1912)
  - Harold Larwood, fast bowler (cricket) (born 1904)
- 24 July
  - Jerry Lordan, singer-songwriter (born 1934)
  - George Rodger, photojournalist (born 1908)
- 25 July – Janice Elliott, novelist and journalist (born 1931)
- 28 July – Susie Cooper, ceramicist (born 1902)
- 30 July – Harry L. Shorto, linguist (born 1919)

=== August ===
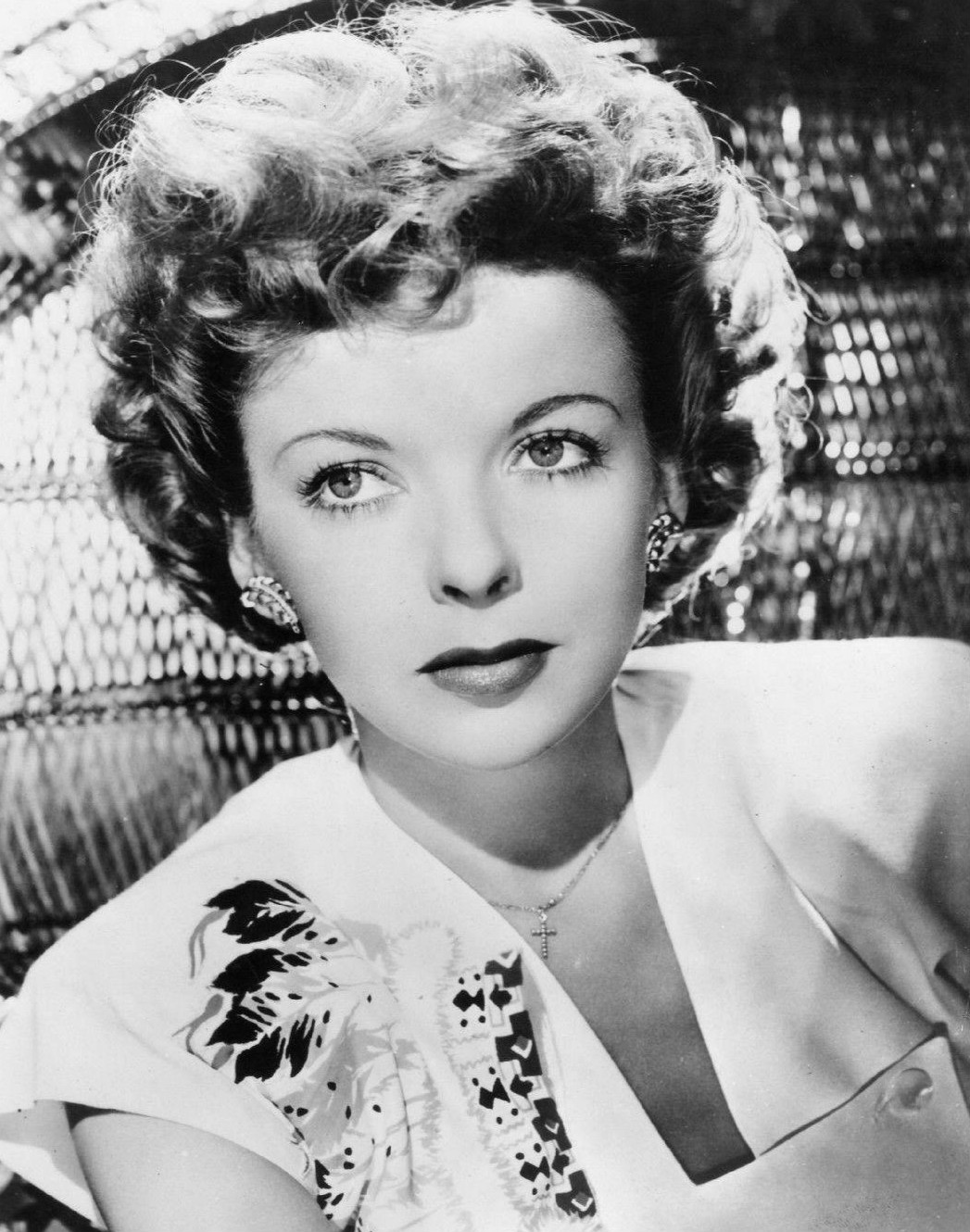
Ida Lupino

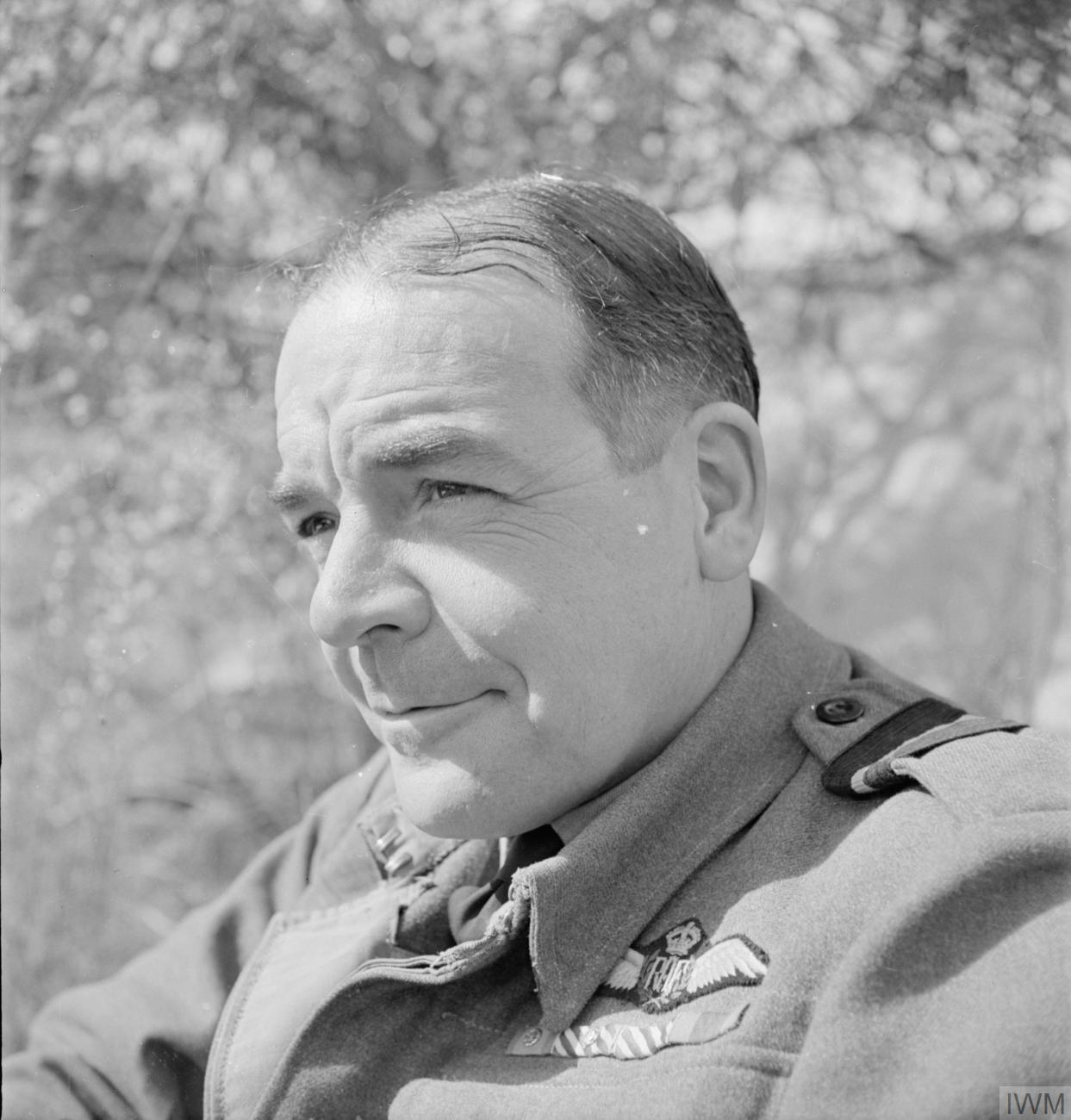
Harry Broadhurst

- 2 August – Thomas Brimelow, Baron Brimelow, diplomat (born 1915)
- 3 August
  - Ida Lupino, actress and director (born 1914)
  - Alan Mitchell, dendrologist (born 1922)
- 5 August – Mark Colton, racing driver (born 1961); killed while racing
- 6 August – Harold Lever, Baron Lever of Manchester, lawyer and politician (born 1914)
- 7 August
  - Brigid Brophy, novelist (born 1929)
  - Dursley McLinden, actor (born 1965 in the Isle of Man) (AIDS-related)
- 10 August – Peter Williams, dance critic (born 1914)
- 11 August – Herbert Sumsion, organist (born 1899)
- 12 August – Raymond Sandover, British Brigadier who served in the Australian Army (born 1910)
- 13 August – Alison Hargreaves, mountain climber (born 1962); died while descending
- 15 August – Humphrey Moore, pacifist and journalist (born 1909)
- 17 August
  - Marjorie Sykes, educator and peace activist (born 1905)
  - David Warrilow, actor (born 1934)
- 19 August – Johnny Carey, footballer and football manager (born 1919)
- 21 August – Anatole Fistoulari, orchestral conductor (born 1907, Russian Empire)
- 23 August – Arthur Holt, politician (born 1914)
- 24 August – Jason McRoy, mountain bike racer (born 1971); road accident
- 25 August – John Brunner, science fiction writer (born 1934)
- 27 August – Carl Giles, cartoonist (born 1916)
- 29 August – Harry Broadhurst, World War II air ace (born 1905)
- 31 August – David Farrar, actor (born 1908)

=== September ===
- 3 September – Mary Adshead, painter, illustrator and designer (born 1904)
- 5 September – Francis Showering, brewer, founder of Babycham (born 1912)
- 8 September – Peter Baxandall, audio engineer and electronics engineer (born 1921)
- 9 September – Ida Carroll, musician and composer (born 1905)
- 10 September – Derek Meddings, special effects designer (born 1931)
- 11 September – Kieth O'dor, motor racing driver (born 1962); killed while racing
- 12 September
  - Jeremy Brett, actor (born 1933)
  - Tom Helmore, actor (born 1904)
- 14 September – A. E. Wilder-Smith, organic chemist (born 1915)
- 16 September – Michael Balfour, historian and civil servant (born 1908)
- 17 September – Catherine Cobb, jeweller (born 1903)
- 18 September – Donald Davie, poet and literary critic (born 1922)
- 19 September – Sir Rudolf Peierls, physicist (born 1907, German Empire)
- 20 September – Monica Maurice, industrialist (born 1908)
- 21 September – William Murray, educationist (born 1912)
- 25 September – Dave Bowen, footballer and football manager (born 1928)
- 26 September – Lynette Roberts, poet and novelist (born 1909)
- 28 September – Albert Johanneson, South African born, British based footballer (born 1940)
- 29 September
  - Alfred Felix Landon Beeston, Orientalist (born 1911)
  - Susan Fleetwood, actress (born 1944)
- 30 September – Frederick Warner, diplomat (born 1918)

=== October ===
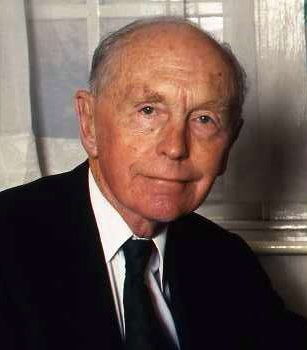
Alec Douglas-Home

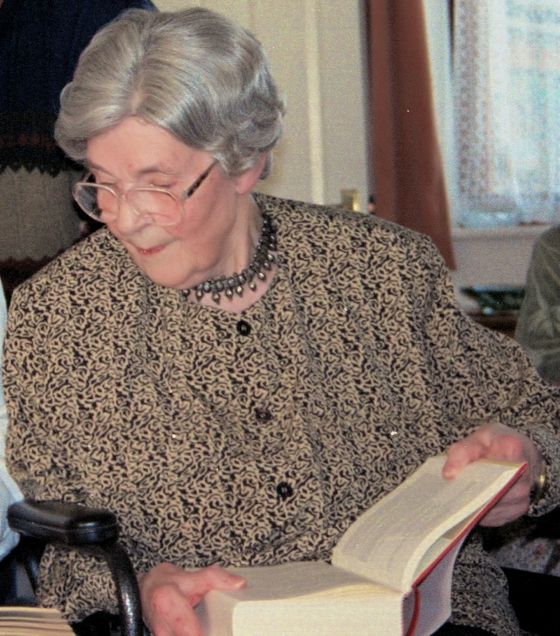
Edith Pargeter

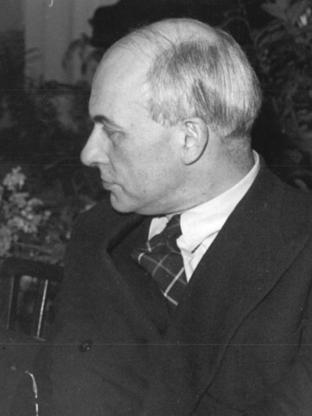
Alan Bush

- 1 October – Rene Cloke, artist (born 1904)
- 2 October – Elizabeth Jane Lloyd, artist and art teacher (born 1928)
- 5 October – Arthur Barbosa, artist (born 1908)
- 6 October – Anthony Newlands, actor (born 1925)
- 8 October
  - John Cairncross, Scottish-born public servant, spy for the Soviet Union, academic and writer (born 1913)
  - Sir Geoffrey Warnock, philosopher (born 1923)
- 9 October – Alec Douglas-Home, politician, Prime Minister (1963–64) (born 1903)
- 12 October – Gary Bond, actor and singer (born 1940)
- 14 October – Edith Pargeter, writer (born 1913)
- 16 October – Richard Caldicot, actor (born 1908)
- 18 October
  - Bryan Johnson, actor and singer (born 1926)
  - Ted Whiteaway, racing driver (born 1928)
- 20 October – Eric Birley, archaeologist and historian (born 1908)
- 22 October
  - Kingsley Amis, writer (born 1922)
  - Ralph Whitlock, farmer, conservationist and author (born 1914)
- 23 October – Gavin Ewart, poet (born 1916)
- 24 October
  - Marion Adnams, painter, printmaker and draughtswoman (born 1898)
  - Ronnie Selby Wright, Church of Scotland minister (born 1908)
- 30 October
  - Brian Easdale, composer (born 1909)
  - Paul Ferris, composer (born 1941); suicide
- 31 October
  - Alan Bush, composer, pianist and conductor (born 1900)
  - Derek Enright, politician (born 1935)
  - Henry Percy, 11th Duke of Northumberland, peer (born 1953)

=== November ===
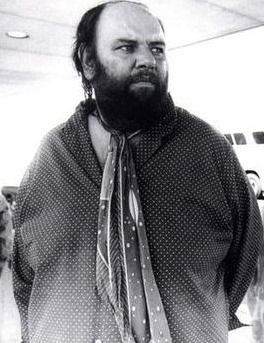
Peter Grant

- 1 November
  - Bill Hudson, Army officer in World War II (born 1910)
  - Desmond Shawe-Taylor, music critic (born 1907)
- 3 November
  - Wallas Eaton, actor (born 1917)
  - John Orchard, actor (born 1928)
- 4 November
  - Marti Caine, comedian and actress (born 1945)
  - Paul Eddington, actor (born 1927)
- 7 November
  - Andrea Adams, journalist and broadcaster (born 1946)
  - Felicity Winifred Carter, author and playwright (born 1906)
- 9 November – F. G. Emmison, archivist and historian (born 1907)
- 12 November – Sir Robert Stephens, actor (born 1931)
- 14 November – Jack Holt, boat designer (born 1906)
- 15 November – Billy Hughes, educationist and politician (born 1914)
- 16 November
  - Leah Betts, high-profile victim of the drug ecstasy (born 1977)
  - Gwyn A. Williams, historian (born 1925)
- 18 November
  - John G. Collier, chemical engineer (born 1935)
  - Miron Grindea, literary journalist (born 1909, Romania)
- 20 November – Robin Gandy, mathematician (born 1919)
- 21 November
  - Peter Grant, manager of the band Led Zeppelin (born 1935)
  - Wilfred White, equestrian (born 1904)
- 22 November – Edna Deane, dancer and choreographer (born 1905)
- 24 November
  - Malcolm Munthe, soldier, writer and curator (born 1910)
  - Leslie O'Brien, Baron O'Brien of Lothbury, banker, Governor of the Bank of England (1966–1973) (born 1908)
- 25 November – Alan Nicholls, English football goalkeeper (born 1973)
- 26 November
  - Sydney D. Bailey, author and pacifist (born 1916)
  - Charles Warrell, teacher and creator of the I-Spy books (born 1889)

=== December ===
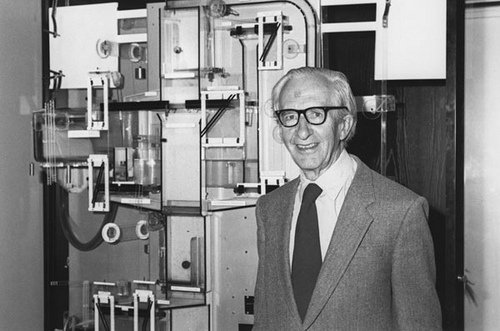
James Meade

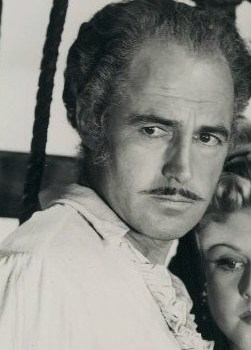
Patric Knowles

- 3 December – Jimmy Jewel, actor (born 1909)
- 5 December
  - Charles Evans, mountaineer (born 1918)
  - Keith Runcorn, geophysicist (born 1922)
- 6 December – Trevor Key, photographer (born 1947)
- 7 December
  - James Derek Birchall, chemist (born 1930); road accident
  - Kathleen Harrison, actress (born 1892)
- 8 December – Philip Lawrence, school headteacher (born 1947); murdered
- 9 December
  - Hugh Clegg, academic (born 1920)
  - Benny Lee, actor (born 1916)
  - Gillian Rose, philosopher and author (born 1947)
- 10 December
  - Sir Godfrey Agnew, civil servant (born 1913)
  - Mary Lascelles, literary scholar (born 1900)
  - Lavinia Fitzalan-Howard, Duchess of Norfolk, noblewoman (born 1916)
- 11 December – Arthur Mullard, actor and singer (born 1910)
- 12 December – Sir David Lightbown, politician (born 1932)
- 14 December – Constance Tipper, metallurgist and crystallographer (born 1894)
- 17 December – Peter Warlock, magician (born 1904)
- 18 December – Brian Brockless, organist and composer (born 1926)
- 20 December – John Jacques, Baron Jacques, businessman and politician (born 1905)
- 21 December – Trenchard Cox, museum director (born 1905)
- 22 December
  - David Land, impresario and theatre producer (born 1918)
  - James Meade, economist, Nobel Prize laureate (born 1907)
- 23 December – Patric Knowles, actor (born 1911)
- 27 December – Jeremy John Beadle, critic, writer and broadcaster (born 1956)
- 29 December – Harold Collison, Baron Collison, trade unionist (born 1909)
- 31 December – David Anderson, politician, lawyer and judge (born 1916)

== See also ==
- 1995 in British music
- 1995 in British television
- List of British films of 1995
