= 2012–13 Doncaster Rovers F.C. season =

Doncaster Rovers
2012–13 season
- Chairman: John Ryan
- Manager: Dean Saunders (until 7 Jan.); Brian Flynn (from 17 Jan.)
- Stadium: Keepmoat Stadium
- League One: 1st (champions)
- FA Cup: Second Round
- League Cup: Third Round
- Top goalscorer: League: Billy Paynter (15); All: Billy Paynter (15)
- Highest home attendance: 12,785 vs. Sheffield United, 1 January
- Lowest home attendance: 4,030 vs. Chesterfield, 9 October
- Average home league attendance: 6,843
| Home colours | Away colours | Third colours |

The 2012–13 season was Doncaster Rover's 10th consecutive season in The Football League. Doncaster were relegated at the end of the 2011–12 season, ending a four-year stay in the Championship. They finished the season as Champions thus gaining promotion back to the second tier.

== League One ==
=== Standings ===
| Pos | Team | Pld | W | D | L | GF | GA | GD | Pts | Promotion, qualification or relegation |
|---|---|---|---|---|---|---|---|---|---|---|
| 1 | Doncaster Rovers (C, P) | 46 | 25 | 9 | 12 | 62 | 44 | +18 | 84 | Promotion to Football League Championship |
| 2 | Bournemouth (P) | 46 | 24 | 11 | 11 | 76 | 53 | +23 | 83 | Promotion to Football League Championship |
| 3 | Brentford | 46 | 21 | 16 | 9 | 62 | 47 | +15 | 79 | Qualification for League One play-offs (Note: Four teams play for one spot and promotion to Football League Championship.) |
| 4 | Yeovil Town (O, P) | 46 | 23 | 8 | 15 | 71 | 56 | +15 | 77 | Qualification for League One play-offs |
| 5 | Sheffield United | 46 | 19 | 18 | 9 | 56 | 42 | +14 | 75 | Qualification for League One play-offs |

Updated to match(es) played on 27 April 2013. Source: BBC Sport
Rules for classification: 1) Points; 2) Goal difference; 3) Number of goals scored
(C) Champions; (O) Play-off winners; (P) Promoted

==== Results summary ====
| Overall | | | | | | | | Home | | | | | | Away | | | | | |
| Pld | W | D | L | GF | GA | GD | Pts | W | D | L | GF | GA | GD | W | D | L | GF | GA | GD |
|---|---|---|---|---|---|---|---|---|---|---|---|---|---|---|---|---|---|---|---|
| 46 | 25 | 9 | 12 | 62 | 44 | +18 | 84 | 10 | 5 | 8 | 26 | 23 | +3 | 15 | 4 | 4 | 36 | 21 | +15 |

Last updated: 28 April 2013.

==== Result round by round ====
| Round | 1 | 2 | 3 | 4 | 5 | 6 | 7 | 8 | 9 | 10 | 11 | 12 | 13 | 14 | 15 | 16 | 17 | 18 | 19 | 20 | 21 | 22 | 23 | 24 | 25 | 26 | 27 | 28 | 29 | 30 | 31 | 32 | 33 | 34 | 35 | 36 | 37 | 38 | 39 | 40 | 41 | 42 | 43 | 44 | 45 | 46 |
|---|---|---|---|---|---|---|---|---|---|---|---|---|---|---|---|---|---|---|---|---|---|---|---|---|---|---|---|---|---|---|---|---|---|---|---|---|---|---|---|---|---|---|---|---|---|---|
| Ground | A | H | H | A | A | A | H | A | H | H | A | H | A | A | H | H | A | A | H | H | A | H | A | A | H | H | A | H | A | H | H | A | H | A | H | A | A | H | A | H | H | H | H | A | H | A |
| Result | W | W | L | L | W | D | D | W | L | W | D | W | W | W | L | L | W | W | W | W | D | L | W | W | D | W | W | W | L | L | D | D | D | W | W | L | W | D | W | L | W | W | L | W | L | W |
| Position | 2 | 2 | 5 | 9 | 9 | 10 | 12 | 10 | 11 | 10 | 9 | 7 | 6 | 5 | 6 | 9 | 8 | 4 | 3 | 2 | 2 | 4 | 4 | 3 | 3 | 2 | 2 | 2 | 2 | 2 | 2 | 2 | 4 | 1 | 1 | 1 | 1 | 1 | 1 | 1 | 1 | 1 | 1 | 1 | 2 | 1 |

Updated to match(es) played on 28 April 2013. Source:
A = Away; H = Home; W = Win; D = Draw; L = Loss

== Squad ==
=== Detailed Overview ===
As of 25 February 2013

| No. | Name | Nat. | Place of birth | Date of birth | Club apps. | Club goals | Int. caps | Int. goals | Previous club | Date joined | Fee | Contract end |
|---|---|---|---|---|---|---|---|---|---|---|---|---|
| 1 | Neil Sullivan | (Scotland) | Sutton (England) | 24 February 1970 | 204 | 0 | 28 | 0 | Leeds United | 15 May 2007 | Free | 30 June 2013 |
| 2 | Paul Quinn | (Scotland) | Wishaw | 21 July 1985 | 15 | 0 | – | – | Cardiff City | 9 August 2012 | Free | 30 June 2013 |
| 3 | James Husband | (England) | Leeds | 3 January 1994 | 14 | 0 | – | – | N/A | 21 November 2011 | Trainee | 30 July 2014 |
| 5 | Rob Jones | (England) | Stockton-on-Tees | 3 November 1979 | 14 | 2 | – | – | Sheffield Wednesday | 31 July 2012 | Free | 30 June 2015 |
| 6 | Dave Syers | (England) | Leeds | 19 October 1977 | 16 | 2 | – | – | Bradford City | 14 June 2012 | Free | 30 June 2014 |
| 7 | Martin Woods | (Scotland) | Airdrie | 1 January 1986 | 124 | 9 | – | – | Rotherham United | 5 June 2007 | Free | 30 June 2013 |
| 8 | Billy Paynter | (England) | Liverpool | 13 July 1984 | 11 | 3 | – | – | Leeds United | 13 August 2012 | Undisclosed | 30 June 2014 |
| 9 | Chris Brown | (England) | Doncaster | 11 December 1984 | 49 | 17 | – | – | Preston North End | 14 July 2011 | Free | 30 June 2013 |
| 10 | Robbie Blake | (England) | Middlesbrough | 4 March 1976 | 7 | 0 | – | – | Bolton Wanderers | 27 June 2012 | Free | 30 June 2013 |
| 11 | David Cotterill | (Wales) | Cardiff | 4 December 1987 | 16 | 5 | 19 | 1 | Barnsley | 27 June 2012 | Free | 30 June 2014 |
| 12 | John Lundstram | (England) | Liverpool | 18 February 1994 | – | – | – | – | Everton | 20 February 2013 | Loan | 20 March 2013 |
| 13 | Jonathan Maxted | (England) | | 26 October 1993 | – | – | – | – | N/A | 26 June 2012 | Trainee | 30 June 2013 |
| 14 | Tommy Spurr | (England) | Leeds | 30 September 1987 | 37 | 0 | – | – | Sheffield Wednesday | 28 June 2011 | £200,000 | 30 June 2013 |
| 15 | Liam Wakefield | (England) | Doncaster | 9 April 1994 | 1 | 0 | – | – | N/A | 27 June 2012 | Trainee | 30 June 2013 |
| 16 | Jamie McCombe | (England) | Pontefract | 1 January 1983 | 11 | 0 | – | – | Huddersfield Town | 12 August 2012 | Free | 30 June 2014 |
| 17 | Iain Hume | (Canada) | Edinburgh (Scotland) | 30 October 1983 | 7 | 1 | 36 | 5 | Preston North End | 31 August 2012 | Loan | 30 May 2013 |
| 18 | Emile Sinclair | (England) | Leeds | 29 December 1987 | – | – | – | – | Peterborough United | 5 January 2013 | Loan | 30 May 2013 |
| 19 | Andy Griffin | (England) | Higher End | 17 March 1979 | – | – | – | – | Free Agent | 22 October 2012 | Free | 30 June 2013 |
| 20 | James Harper | (England) | Chelmsford | 9 November 1980 | 12 | 0 | – | – | Hull City | 17 August 2012 | Free | 30 June 2013 |
| 21 | Lee Fowler | (Wales) | Cardiff | 10 June 1983 | – | – | – | – | Fleetwood Town | 4 January 2013 | Undisclosed | 30 June 2013 |
| 22 | Cameron Howieson | (New Zealand) | Blenheim | 22 December 1994 | – | – | 4 | 0 | Burnley | 22 February 2013 | Loan | 31 May 2013 |
| 23 | Kyle Bennett | (England) | Telford | 9 September 1990 | 54 | 7 | – | – | Bury | 1 July 2011 | £80,000 | 30 June 2013 |
| 25 | Jordan Ball | (England) | Mansfield | 12 September 1993 | 2 | 1 | – | – | N/A | 9 August 2011 | Trainee | 30 June 2013 |
| 26 | James Coppinger | (England) | Guisborough | 10 January 1981 | 341 | 35 | – | – | Exeter City | 30 June 2004 | £30,000 | 30 June 2014 |
| 27 | Josh Meade | (England) | – | 16 April 1995 | – | – | – | – | N/A | – | Trainee | – |
| 29 | Harry Middleton | (England) | – | 12 April 1995 | – | – | – | – | N/A | – | Trainee | – |
| 30 | Paul Keegan | (Republic of Ireland) | Dublin | 5 July 1984 | 21 | 0 | – | – | Bohemians | 17 January 2011 | Undisclosed | 30 June 2013 |
| 31 | Paddy Mullen | (England) | Doncaster | 13 January 1994 | – | – | – | – | N/A | 22 June 2012 | Trainee | 30 June 2013 |
| 32 | Jordan Binns | (England) | – | 1 November 1994 | – | – | – | – | N/A | – | Trainee | – |
| 33 | Gary Woods | (England) | Kettering | 1 October 1990 | 49 | 0 | – | – | Manchester United | 26 March 2009 | Free | |
| | Jake McCormick | (England) | York | 21 February 1994 | – | – | – | – | N/A | | Trainee | 30 June 2013 |

=== Statistics ===
As of 28 April 2013

| No. | Pos | Nat | Player | Total | | League One | | FA Cup | | League Cup | | League Trophy | |
| No. | Pos | Nat | Player | Apps | Goals | Apps | Goals | Apps | Goals | Apps | Goals | Apps | Goals |
|---|---|---|---|---|---|---|---|---|---|---|---|---|---|
| 1 | GK | (Scotland) SCO | Neil Sullivan | 4 | 0 | 4 | 0 | 0 | 0 | 0 | 0 | 0 | 0 |
| 2 | DF | (Scotland) SCO | Paul Quinn | 43 | 0 | 37+1 | 0 | 1 | 0 | 3 | 0 | 0+1 | 0 |
| 3 | DF | (England) ENG | James Husband | 40 | 3 | 24+9 | 3 | 2 | 0 | 3 | 0 | 2 | 0 |
| 5 | DF | (England) ENG | Rob Jones | 50 | 8 | 45 | 7 | 2 | 0 | 2 | 1 | 1 | 0 |
| 6 | MF | (England) ENG | Dave Syers | 38 | 5 | 20+12 | 3 | 2 | 0 | 1+2 | 2 | 1 | 0 |
| 7 | MF | (Scotland) SCO | Martin Woods | 20 | 2 | 15 | 1 | 1+1 | 1 | 2 | 0 | 1 | 0 |
| 8 | FW | (England) ENG | Billy Paynter | 38 | 15 | 24+11 | 15 | 1 | 0 | 0+1 | 0 | 1 | 0 |
| 9 | FW | (England) ENG | Chris Brown | 42 | 11 | 28+8 | 8 | 1+1 | 1 | 1+1 | 1 | 1+1 | 1 |
| 11 | MF | (Wales) WAL | David Cotterill | 48 | 10 | 44 | 10 | 0 | 0 | 1+1 | 0 | 2 | 0 |
| 12 | MF | (England) ENG | John Lundstram (on loan from Everton) | 14 | 0 | 14 | 0 | 0 | 0 | 0 | 0 | 0 | 0 |
| 13 | GK | (England) ENG | Jonathan Maxted | 0 | 0 | 0 | 0 | 0 | 0 | 0 | 0 | 0 | 0 |
| 14 | DF | (England) ENG | Tommy Spurr | 52 | 1 | 46 | 1 | 2 | 0 | 3 | 0 | 1 | 0 |
| 15 | DF | (England) ENG | Liam Wakefield | 2 | 0 | 0 | 0 | 0 | 0 | 0+1 | 0 | 1 | 0 |
| 16 | DF | (England) ENG | Jamie McCombe | 34 | 1 | 32 | 1 | 0 | 0 | 2 | 0 | 0 | 0 |
| 17 | FW | (Canada) CAN | Iain Hume (on loan from Preston North End) | 35 | 7 | 24+8 | 6 | 1 | 1 | 1 | 0 | 0+1 | 0 |
| 18 | FW | (England) ENG | Emile Sinclair (on loan from Peterborough United) | 4 | 0 | 1+3 | 0 | 0 | 0 | 0 | 0 | 0 | 0 |
| 19 | DF | (England) ENG | Andy Griffin | 18 | 0 | 8+8 | 0 | 1 | 0 | 0 | 0 | 1 | 0 |
| 20 | MF | (England) ENG | James Harper | 29 | 0 | 19+8 | 0 | 0 | 0 | 2 | 0 | 0 | 0 |
| 22 | MF | (New Zealand) NZL | Cameron Howieson (on loan from Burnley) | 0 | 0 | 0 | 0 | 0 | 0 | 0 | 0 | 0 | 0 |
| 23 | MF | (England) ENG | Kyle Bennett | 38 | 3 | 26+9 | 3 | 0 | 0 | 1+1 | 0 | 1 | 0 |
| 24 | MF | (Republic of Ireland) IRL | Evan Finnegan | 1 | 0 | 0 | 0 | 0 | 0 | 0 | 0 | 0+1 | 0 |
| 25 | FW | (England) ENG | Jordan Ball | 2 | 1 | 0+1 | 0 | 0 | 0 | 0 | 0 | 0+1 | 1 |
| 26 | MF | (England) ENG | James Coppinger | 27 | 2 | 19+6 | 2 | 0 | 0 | 2 | 0 | 0 | 0 |
| 27 | MF | (England) ENG | Josh Meade | 1 | 0 | 0 | 0 | 0 | 0 | 0 | 0 | 1 | 0 |
| 29 | MF | (England) ENG | Harry Middleton | 1 | 0 | 0 | 0 | 0 | 0 | 0 | 0 | 1 | 0 |
| 30 | MF | (Republic of Ireland) IRL | Paul Keegan | 30 | 1 | 22+3 | 1 | 2 | 0 | 2 | 0 | 1 | 0 |
| 31 | MF | (England) ENG | Paddy Mullen | 0 | 0 | 0 | 0 | 0 | 0 | 0 | 0 | 0 | 0 |
| 32 | DF | (England) ENG | Jordan Binns | 0 | 0 | 0 | 0 | 0 | 0 | 0 | 0 | 0 | 0 |
| 33 | GK | (England) ENG | Gary Woods | 49 | 0 | 42 | 0 | 2 | 0 | 3 | 0 | 2 | 0 |
| 35 | MF | (South Africa) RSA | Dean Furman (on loan from Oldham Athletic) | 8 | 0 | 6+2 | 0 | 0 | 0 | 0 | 0 | 0 | 0 |
Players currently out on loan:
| 21 | MF | (Wales) WAL | Lee Fowler (at Burton Albion) | 4 | 0 | 1+3 | 0 | 0 | 0 | 0 | 0 | 0 | 0 |
| | MF | (England) ENG | Jake McCormick (at Frickley Athletic) | 0 | 0 | 0 | 0 | 0 | 0 | 0 | 0 | 0 | 0 |
Players who have left the club:
| 4 | DF | (Curaçao) CUW | Shelton Martis | 12 | 0 | 3+6 | 0 | 1 | 0 | 1 | 0 | 1 | 0 |
| 10 | FW | (England) ENG | Robbie Blake | 14 | 1 | 0+7 | 0 | 1+1 | 1 | 2+1 | 0 | 2 | 0 |
| 12 | MF | (England) ENG | Michael Woods | 1 | 0 | 0 | 0 | 0+1 | 0 | 0 | 0 | 0 | 0 |
| 21 | MF | (Northern Ireland) NIR | Sammy Clingan | 9 | 0 | 1+5 | 0 | 2 | 0 | 0 | 0 | 1 | 0 |

==== Captains ====
| No. | P | Name | Country | No. games | Notes |
|---|---|---|---|---|---|
| 5 | DF | Rob Jones | (England) | 48 | |
| 14 | DF | Tommy Spurr | (England) | 3 | |

Last updated: 28 April 2012
Source: Competitive match reports.
Competitive matches only
Matches started as captain only
Country: FIFA nationality; No.: Squad number; P: Position; Name: Player name; No. Games: Number of games started as captain.

==== Goalscorers ====
| Rank | No. | Pos. | Name | League One | FA Cup | League Cup | League Trophy | Total |
|---|---|---|---|---|---|---|---|---|
| 1 | 8 | FW | Billy Paynter | 15 | 0 | 0 | 0 | 15 |
| 2 | 9 | FW | Chris Brown | 8 | 1 | 1 | 1 | 11 |
| 3 | 11 | MF | David Cotterill | 10 | 0 | 0 | 0 | 10 |
| 4 | 5 | DF | Rob Jones | 7 | 0 | 1 | 0 | 8 |
| 5 | 17 | FW | Iain Hume | 6 | 1 | 0 | 0 | 7 |
| 6 | 6 | MF | Dave Syers | 3 | 0 | 2 | 0 | 5 |
| 7 | 23 | MF | Kyle Bennett | 3 | 0 | 0 | 0 | 3 |
| 7 | 3 | DF | James Husband | 3 | 0 | 0 | 0 | 3 |
| 7 | Own Goals | | | 3 | 0 | 0 | 0 | 3 |
| 10 | 10 | FW | Robbie Blake | 0 | 2 | 0 | 0 | 2 |
| 10 | 26 | MF | James Coppinger | 2 | 0 | 0 | 0 | 2 |
| 10 | 7 | MF | Martin Woods | 1 | 1 | 0 | 0 | 2 |
| 13 | 25 | FW | Jordan Ball | 0 | 0 | 0 | 1 | 1 |
| 13 | 30 | MF | Paul Keegan | 1 | 0 | 0 | 0 | 1 |
| 13 | 16 | DF | Jamie McCombe | 1 | 0 | 0 | 0 | 1 |
| 13 | 14 | DF | Tommy Spurr | 1 | 0 | 0 | 0 | 1 |
| Total | | | | 64 | 4 | 4 | 2 | 74 |

==== Disciplinary record ====
| No. | Pos. | Name | League One | | FA Cup | | League Cup | | League Trophy | | Total | |
| No. | Pos. | Name | Yellow card | Red card | Yellow card | Red card | Yellow card | Red card | Yellow card | Red card | Yellow card | Red card |
|---|---|---|---|---|---|---|---|---|---|---|---|---|
| 2 | DF | Paul Quinn | 4 | 0 | 1 | 0 | 1 | 0 | 0 | 0 | 6 | 0 |
| 3 | DF | James Husband | 5 | 0 | 0 | 0 | 0 | 0 | 0 | 0 | 5 | 0 |
| 4 | DF | Shelton Martis | 1 | 0 | 0 | 0 | 0 | 0 | 0 | 0 | 1 | 0 |
| 5 | DF | Rob Jones | 7 | 0 | 1 | 0 | 0 | 0 | 1 | 0 | 9 | 0 |
| 6 | MF | Dave Syers | 5 | 0 | 0 | 0 | 0 | 0 | 0 | 0 | 5 | 0 |
| 7 | MF | Martin Woods | 1 | 0 | 0 | 0 | 0 | 0 | 0 | 0 | 1 | 0 |
| 8 | FW | Billy Paynter | 3 | 1 | 0 | 0 | 0 | 0 | 0 | 0 | 3 | 1 |
| 9 | FW | Chris Brown | 4 | 0 | 0 | 0 | 0 | 0 | 0 | 0 | 4 | 0 |
| 10 | FW | Robbie Blake | 0 | 0 | 0 | 0 | 0 | 0 | 2 | 0 | 2 | 0 |
| 11 | MF | David Cotterill | 10 | 0 | 0 | 0 | 0 | 0 | 0 | 0 | 10 | 0 |
| 12 | MF | John Lundstram | 1 | 0 | 0 | 0 | 0 | 0 | 0 | 0 | 1 | 0 |
| 14 | DF | Tommy Spurr | 2 | 0 | 0 | 0 | 0 | 0 | 0 | 0 | 2 | 0 |
| 16 | DF | Jamie McCombe | 3 | 0 | 0 | 0 | 0 | 0 | 0 | 0 | 3 | 0 |
| 17 | FW | Iain Hume | 5 | 1 | 0 | 0 | 0 | 0 | 0 | 0 | 5 | 1 |
| 19 | DF | Andy Griffin | 2 | 0 | 1 | 0 | 0 | 0 | 0 | 0 | 3 | 0 |
| 20 | MF | James Harper | 1 | 0 | 0 | 0 | 0 | 0 | 0 | 0 | 1 | 0 |
| 21 | MF | Sammy Clingan | 0 | 0 | 1 | 0 | 0 | 0 | 0 | 0 | 1 | 0 |
| 21 | MF | Lee Fowler | 2 | 0 | 0 | 0 | 0 | 0 | 0 | 0 | 2 | 0 |
| 23 | MF | Kyle Bennett | 4 | 0 | 0 | 0 | 0 | 0 | 0 | 0 | 4 | 0 |
| 26 | MF | James Coppinger | 2 | 0 | 0 | 0 | 0 | 0 | 0 | 0 | 2 | 0 |
| 30 | MF | Paul Keegan | 6 | 0 | 1 | 0 | 1 | 0 | 0 | 0 | 8 | 0 |
| 33 | GK | Gary Woods | 3 | 0 | 0 | 0 | 0 | 0 | 0 | 0 | 3 | 0 |
| 35 | MF | Dean Furman | 1 | 0 | 0 | 0 | 0 | 0 | 0 | 0 | 1 | 0 |
| Total | | | 67 | 2 | 5 | 0 | 3 | 0 | 1 | 0 | 77 | 2 |

=== Contracts ===
| No. | Pos. | Nat. | Name | Age | Status | Contract length | Expiry date | Source |
|---|---|---|---|---|---|---|---|---|
| 30 | MF | (Republic of Ireland) | Paul Keegan | 28 | Signed | 1 year | June 2013 | |
| 3 | DF | (England) | James Husband | 18 | Signed | 3 years | June 2015 | |
| 19 | DF | (England) | Andy Griffin | 33 | Signed | 6 months | June 2013 | |

== Transfers ==
=== In ===
| No. | Pos. | Nat. | Name | Age | EU | Moving from | Type | Transfer window | Ends | Transfer fee | Source |
|---|---|---|---|---|---|---|---|---|---|---|---|
| 6 | MF | (England) | Dave Syers | 24 | EU | Bradford City | Free Transfer | Summer | 2014 | Free | |
| 25 | FW | (England) | Jordan Ball | 18 | EU | Youth system | Promoted | Summer | 2013 | Youth system | |
| 31 | MF | (England) | Paddy Mullen | 18 | EU | Youth system | Promoted | Summer | 2013 | Youth system | |
| — | MF | (England) | Jake McCormick | 18 | EU | Youth system | Promoted | Summer | 2013 | Youth system | |
| 15 | DF | (England) | Liam Wakefield | 18 | EU | Youth system | Promoted | Summer | 2013 | Youth system | |
| 13 | GK | (England) | Jonathan Maxted | 18 | EU | Youth system | Promoted | Summer | 2013 | Youth system | |
| 10 | FW | (England) | Robbie Blake | 36 | EU | Bolton Wanderers | Free Transfer | Summer | 2013 | Free | |
| 11 | MF | (Wales) | David Cotterill | 24 | EU | Barnsley | Free Transfer | Summer | 2014 | Free | |
| 5 | DF | (England) | Rob Jones | 32 | EU | Sheffield Wednesday | Free Transfer | Summer | 2014 | Free | |
| 2 | DF | (Scotland) | Paul Quinn | 27 | EU | Cardiff City (Wales) | Free Transfer | Summer | 2013 | Free | |
| 16 | DF | (England) | Jamie McCombe | 29 | EU | Huddersfield Town | Free Transfer | Summer | 2014 | Free | |
| 8 | FW | (England) | Billy Paynter | 28 | EU | Leeds United | Transfer | Summer | 2014 | Undisclosed | |
| 20 | MF | (England) | James Harper | 31 | EU | Hull City | Free Transfer | Summer | 2013 | Free | |
| 12 | MF | (England) | Michael Woods | 22 | EU | Free agent | Free Transfer | | N/A | Free | |
| 19 | DF | (England) | Andy Griffin | 33 | EU | Free agent | Free Transfer | | N/A | Free | |
| 21 | MF | (Northern Ireland) | Sammy Clingan | 28 | EU | Free agent | Free Transfer | | Month-to-Month | Free | |
| 21 | MF | (Wales) | Lee Fowler | 29 | EU | Fleetwood Town | Transfer | Winter | 2013 | Undisclosed | |

=== Loans in ===
| No. | Pos. | Name | Country | Age | Loan club | Started | Ended | Start source | End source |
|---|---|---|---|---|---|---|---|---|---|
| 17 | FW | Iain Hume | (Canada) (Scotland) | 42 | Preston North End | 31 August | | | |
| 18 | FW | Emile Sinclair | (England) | 25 | Peterborough United | 5 January | 30 May | | |
| 12 | MF | John Lundstram | (England) | 32 | Everton | 20 February | 31 May | | |
| 22 | MF | Cameron Howieson | (New Zealand) | 18 | Burnley | 21 February | 31 May | | |
| 35 | MF | Dean Furman | (South Africa) | 24 | Oldham Athletic | 14 March | 31 May | | |

Sources: For loan start source see "Start source". For loan end source see "End source".
EU = if holds or not a European Union passport; Country: when 2 flags, 1st flag = country that plays for internationally, 2nd flag = country of birth; No. = number on jersey; P = Position (for position name, pause mouse pointer on abbreviation); Name = Name on jersey (for more extensive name, pause mouse pointer on name); In/Out = In: The player came in on loan, Out: The player went out on loan; Loan club = the club that the player moved on loan to or the club that the player came from on loan; Started = the date when the player's loan started; Ended = the date when the player's loan ended.

=== Out ===
| No. | Pos. | Name | Country | Age | Type | Moving to | Transfer window | Transfer fee | Apps | Goals | Source |
|---|---|---|---|---|---|---|---|---|---|---|---|
| 17 | MF | Giles Barnes | (England) | 23 | Out of Contract | Houston Dynamo (United States) | Summer | Free | 36 | 1 | |
| 25 | MF | James Baxendale | (England) | 19 | Out of Contract | Walsall | Summer | Free | 3 | 0 | |
| 29 | DF | Bouhenna | (Algeria) (France) | 20 | Out of Contract | | Summer | Free | 0 | 0 | |
| 6 | DF | James Chambers | (England) | 31 | Out of Contract | Walsall | Summer | Free | 97 | 0 | |
| 39 | DF | Pascal Chimbonda | (France) | 33 | Out of Contract | | Summer | Free | 15 | 0 | |
| 10 | FW | El Hadji Diouf | (Senegal) | 31 | Out of Contract | Leeds United | Summer | Free | 23 | 6 | |
| 24 | DF | Mustapha Dumbuya | (England) | 24 | Out of Contract | Portsmouth | Summer | Free | 38 | 0 | |
| 18 | MF | Simon Gillett | (England) | 26 | Out of Contract | Nottingham Forest | Summer | Free | 81 | 4 | |
| 12 | FW | James Hayter | (England) | 33 | Out of Contract | Yeovil Town | Summer | Free | 178 | 39 | |
| 21 | DF | Sam Hird | (England) | 24 | Free Transfer | Chesterfield | Summer | Free | 164 | 2 | |
| 11 | DF | Adam Lockwood | (England) | 30 | Free Transfer | Bury | Summer | Free | 179 | 8 | |
| 16 | MF | John Oster | (Wales) (England) | 33 | Out of Contract | Barnet | Summer | Free | 120 | 2 | |
| 20 | DF | John Radford | (England) | 18 | Out of Contract | | Summer | Free | 0 | 0 | |
| 41 | DF | Habib Beye | (Senegal) | 34 | Contract Terminated | | Summer | Free | 22 | 2 | |
| 3 | DF | George Friend | (England) | 24 | Transfer | Middlesbrough | Summer | Undisclosed | 35 | 1 | |
| 2 | DF | James O'Connor | (England) | 27 | Transfer | Derby County | Summer | Undisclosed | 212 | 5 | |
| 8 | MF | Brian Stock | (Wales) (England) | 30 | Transfer | Burnley | Summer | Undisclosed | 188 | 22 | |
| 21 | MF | Sammy Clingan | (Northern Ireland) | 28 | Released | Free agent | Winter | N/A | 8 | 0 | |
| 4 | DF | Shelton Martis | (Curaçao) | 30 | Contract Terminated | Free agent | | Free | 68 | 4 | |

EU = if holds or not a European Union passport; Country: when 2 flags, 1st flag = country that plays for internationally, 2nd flag = country of birth; N = number on jersey; P = Position (for position name, pause mouse pointer on abbreviation); Name = Name on jersey (for more extensive name, pause mouse pointer on name); Age = age on the day of the signing; Moving from = only indicate the club the player was playing before start playing for this club in this season, for the type of the moving see Status column; Moving to = only indicates the club the player is going to play next, for the type of the moving see Status column; Ends = when the player's current contract ends; n/a = Not applicable; Apps = Total number of competitive appearances (including substitute appearances) at the club prior to departure; Goals = Total number of competitive goals scored at the club prior to departure.

=== Loans out ===
| No. | Pos. | Name | Country | Age | Loan club | Started | Ended | Start source | End source |
|---|---|---|---|---|---|---|---|---|---|
| 13 | GK | Jonathon Maxted | (England) | 32 | Goole Town | September | 18 September | | |
| 15 | DF | Liam Wakefield | (England) | 32 | Bradford Park Avenue | 17 August | October | | |
| 25 | FW | Jordan Ball | (England) | 33 | Belper Town | 17 August | 8 October | | |
| — | MF | Jake McCormick | (England) | 32 | Frickley Athletic | 17 August | | | |
| 26 | MF | James Coppinger | (England) | 31 | Nottingham Forest | 31 August | 30 December | | |
| 13 | GK | Jonathon Maxted | (England) | 32 | Gainsborough Trinity | 30 October | | | |
| 1 | GK | Neil Sullivan | (Scotland) | 43 | Wimbledon | 16 November | 9 March | | |
| 10 | MF | Lee Fowler | (Wales) | 29 | Forest Green Rovers | 26 February | March | | |
| 10 | MF | Lee Fowler | (Wales) | 29 | Burton Albion | 28 March | | | |

Sources: For loan start source see "Start source". For loan end source see "End source".
EU = if holds or not a European Union passport; Country: when 2 flags, 1st flag = country that plays for internationally, 2nd flag = country of birth; No. = number on jersey; P = Position (for position name, pause mouse pointer on abbreviation); Name = Name on jersey (for more extensive name, pause mouse pointer on name); In/Out = In: The player came in on loan, Out: The player went out on loan; Loan club = the club that the player moved on loan to or the club that the player came from on loan; Started = the date when the player's loan started; Ended = the date when the player's loan ended.

== Fixtures ==
=== Pre-season ===
| 17 July 2012 Friendly | Grimsby Town | 2–3 | Doncaster Rovers | Grimsby |
| 19:30 BST | Southwell 68', 74' | Report | 8' Syers; 14' (pen.) Brown; 28' (pen.) Cotterill | Stadium: Blundell Park |

| 21 July 2012 Friendly | Bradford Park Avenue | 3–3 | Doncaster Rovers | Bradford |
| 15:00 BST | O'Brien 15' (pen.); Holland 18'; Marshall 49' | Report | 14' Cotterill; 58', 60' Bennett | Stadium: Horsfall Stadium; Attendance: 296 |

| 24 July 2012 Friendly | Rotherham United | 2–1 | Doncaster Rovers | Rotherham |
| 19:45 BST | Bradley 66'; Agard 79' | Match Report | 54' Cotterill | Stadium: New York Stadium; Attendance: 5967; Referee: Michael Naylor |

| 28 July Friendly | Doncaster Rovers | 0–0 | Sheffield Wednesday | Doncaster |
| 15:00 BST | | | | Stadium: Keepmoat Stadium |

| 4 August Friendly | Doncaster Rovers | 2–2 | Barnsley | Doncaster |
| 15:00 BST | Woods 12'; Syers 77' | Report | 25' (o.g.) Jones; 71' Davies | Stadium: Keepmoat Stadium |

=== League One ===
| 18 August 1 | Walsall | 0–3 | Doncaster Rovers | Walsall |
| 15:00 BST | | Report | 5' Brown; 26' Cotterill; 56' Bennett | Stadium: Bescot Stadium; Attendance: 4,205; Referee: Mark Heywood |

| 21 August 2 | Doncaster Rovers | 2–1 | Bury | Doncaster |
| 19:45 BST | Bennett 36'; Brown 84' | Report | 5' Skarz; (red card) 68' Schumacher | Stadium: Keepmoat Stadium; Attendance: 6,380; Referee: Sarginson |

| 25 August 3 | Doncaster Rovers | 0–1 | Crawley Town | Doncaster |
| 15:00 BST | | Report | 87' Ajose | Stadium: Keepmoat Stadium; Attendance: 6,403; Referee: Kettle |

| 1 September 4 | Yeovil Town | 2–1 | Doncaster Rovers | Yeovil |
| 15:00 BST | Hayter 56'; Ugwu 84' | Report | 90' Paynter | Stadium: Huish Park; Attendance: 3,535; Referee: Mohareb |

| 8 September | Doncaster Rovers | P–P | Oldham Athletic | Doncaster |
| 15:00 BST | | | | Stadium: Keepmoat Stadium |

| 15 September 5 | Colchester United | 1–2 | Doncaster Rovers | Colchester |
| 15:00 BST | Okuonghae 30' | Report | 3' Cotterill; 48' (o.g.) Bond | Stadium: Colchester Community Stadium; Attendance: 3,262; Referee: Sutton |

| 18 September 6 | Sheffield United | 0–0 | Doncaster Rovers | Sheffield |
| 19:45 BST | | Report | | Stadium: Brammall Lane; Attendance: 17,925; Referee: Haywood |

| 22 September 7 | Doncaster Rovers | 1–1 | Stevenage | Doncaster |
| 15:00 BST | Brown 79' | Report | 16' Risser | Stadium: Keepmoat Stadium; Attendance: 5,910; Referee: Phil Gibbs |

| 29 September 8 | Leyton Orient | 0–2 | Doncaster Rovers | London |
| 15:00 BST | | Report | 12' Hume; 21' Cotterill | Stadium: Matchroom Stadium; Attendance: 4,401; Referee: Miller |

| 2 October 9 | Doncaster Rovers | 1–3 | Preston North End | Doncaster |
| 19:45 BST | Cotterill 45' | Report | 33' King; 60' Laird; 71' Beavon | Stadium: Keepmoat Stadium; Attendance: 5,681; Referee: Whitestone |

| 6 October 10 | Doncaster Rovers | 1–0 | Shrewsbury Town | Doncaster |
| 15:00 BST | Paynter 4' (pen.) | Report | | Stadium: Keepmoat Stadium; Attendance: 6,437; Referee: Clarke |

| 13 October 11 | Hartlepool United | 1–1 | Doncaster Rovers | Hartlepool |
| 15:00 BST | Austin 70' (pen.) | Report | 89' Jones | Stadium: Victoria Park; Attendance: 4,406; Referee: Scott |

| 20 October 12 | Doncaster Rovers | 2–1 | Brentford | Doncaster |
| 15:00 BST | Cotterill 74'; Paynter 84' | Report | 45' Douglas | Stadium: Keepmoat Stadium; Attendance: 6,555; Referee: Haines |

| 23 October 13 | Tranmere Rovers | 1–2 | Doncaster Rovers | Tranmere |
| 19:45 BST | Cassidy 87' | Report | 48' Paynter; 90' Hume | Stadium: Prenton Park; Attendance: 7,386; Referee: Mathieson |

| 27 October 14 | Notts County | 0–2 | Doncaster Rovers | Nottingham |
| 15:00 BST | | Report | 61' Keegan; 63' Brown | Stadium: Meadow Lane; Attendance: 6,750; Referee: Tierney |

| 6 November 15 | Doncaster Rovers | 0–2 | Crewe Alexandra | Doncaster |
| 19:45 GMT | | Report | 5' Dalla Valle; 71' Pogba | Stadium: Keepmoat Stadium; Attendance: 5,411; Referee: Duncan |

| 10 November 16 | Doncaster Rovers | 0–1 | Bournemouth | Doncaster |
| 15:00 GMT | | Report | 38' Arter | Stadium: Keepmoat Stadium; Attendance: 5,951; Referee: Bond |

| 17 November 17 | Portsmouth | 0–1 | Doncaster Rovers | Portsmouth |
| 15:00 GMT | | Report | 25' Hume | Stadium: Fratton Park; Attendance: 11,792; Referee: Williamson |

| 20 November 18 | Carlisle United | 1–3 | Doncaster Rovers | Carlisle |
| 19:45 GMT | Symington 66' | Report | 14' Jones; 18' Cotterill; 76' Spurr | Stadium: Brunton Park; Attendance: 3,229; Referee: Brown |

| 24 November 19 | Doncaster Rovers | 4–0 | Scunthorpe United | Doncaster |
| 15:00 GMT | Woods 22'; Cotterill 46'; Jones 62'; Paynter 64' | Report | | Stadium: Keepmoat Stadium; Attendance: 8,037; Referee: Hooper |

| 27 November 20 | Doncaster Rovers | 1–0 | Oldham Athletic | Doncaster |
| 19:45 GMT | Cotterill 69'; Hume (yellow card) 78' (yellow-red card) 90+1' | Report | (red card) 90+2' Bouzanis | Stadium: Keepmoat Stadium; Attendance: 6,066; Referee: Sutton |

| 8 December 21 | Swindon Town | 1–1 | Doncaster Rovers | Swindon |
| 15:00 GMT | Ritchie 8' | Report | 10' (o.g.) Hollands | Stadium: County Ground; Attendance: 7,700; Referee: Phillips |

| 15 December 22 | Doncaster Rovers | 1–4 | Coventry City | Doncaster |
| 15:00 GMT | Brown 76' | Report | 3' Moussa; 26', 58' McGoldrick; 89' Barton | Stadium: Keepmoat Stadium; Attendance: 6,623; Referee: Carl Berry |

| 22 December | Doncaster Rovers | P–P | Milton Keynes Dons | Doncaster |
| 15:00 GMT | | Report | | Stadium: Keepmoat Stadium |

| 26 December 23 | Oldham Athletic | 1–2 | Doncaster Rovers | Oldham |
| 15:00 GMT | M'Changama 27' | Report | 3' Jones; 90' Syers | Stadium: Boundary Park; Attendance: 4,252; Referee: Lewis |

| 29 December 24 | Preston North End | 0–3 | Doncaster Rovers | Preston |
| 15:00 GMT | | Report | 1' Syers; 30' Cotterill; 76' (pen.) Paynter | Stadium: Deepdale; Attendance: 9,262; Referee: Rushton |

| 1 January 25 | Doncaster Rovers | 2–2 | Sheffield United | Doncaster |
| 15:00 GMT | Paynter 18' (pen.) (red card) 87'; Syers 63' | Report | 80' (pen.) Blackman; 89' Kitson | Stadium: Keepmoat Stadium; Attendance: 12,785; Referee: Coote |

| 5 January 26 | Doncaster Rovers | 1–0 | Colchester United | Doncaster |
| 15:00 GMT | Cotterill 84' | Report | | Stadium: Keepmoat Stadium; Attendance: 6,374; Referee: Clark |

| 12 January 27 | Stevenage | 1–2 | Doncaster Rovers | Stevenage |
| 15:00 GMT | Dunne 66' | Report | 79' Hume; 90' Jones | Stadium: Broadhall Way; Attendance: 3,280; Referee: Sarginson |

| 22 January 28 | Doncaster Rovers | 2–0 | Leyton Orient | Doncaster |
| 15:00 GMT | Jones 19'; Brown | Report | | Stadium: Keepmoat Stadium; Attendance: 6,438; Referee: Drysdale |

| 2 February 29 | Bury | 2–0 | Doncaster Rovers | Bury |
| 15:00 GMT | Bishop 25'; Ajose 36' | Report | | Stadium: Gigg Lane; Attendance: 3,618; Referee: Bates |

| 9 February 30 | Doncaster Rovers | 1–2 | Walsall | Doncaster |
| 15:00 GMT | Paynter 16' | Report | 2' Butler; 81' Brandy | Stadium: Keepmoat Stadium; Attendance: 7,013; Referee: Adcock |

| 12 February 31 | Doncaster Rovers | 0–0 | Milton Keynes Dons | Doncaster |
| 19:45 GMT | | Report | | Stadium: Keepmoat Stadium; Attendance: 6,423; Referee: Webb |

| 18 February 32 | Crawley Town | 1–1 | Doncaster Rovers | Crawley |
| 15:00 GMT | Simpson 25' | Report | 43' Husband | Stadium: Broadfield Stadium; Attendance: 3,267; Referee: D'Urso |

| 23 February 33 | Doncaster Rovers | 1–1 | Yeovil Town | Doncaster |
| 15:00 GMT | Paynter 45' | Report | 6' Madden | Stadium: Keepmoat Stadium; Attendance: 6,356; Referee: Ilderton |

| 26 February 34 | Shrewsbury Town | 1–2 | Doncaster Rovers | Shrewsbury |
| 19:45 GMT | McAllister (red card) 37'; Eaves 90' | Report | 73' Husband; 90' Bennett | Stadium: New Meadow; Attendance: 4,886; Referee: Langford |

| 2 March 35 | Doncaster Rovers | 3–0 | Hartlepool United | Doncaster |
| 15:00 GMT | Hume 35'; Coppinger 54'; Paynter 81' | Report | | Stadium: Keepmoat Stadium; Attendance: 7,457; Referee: Bratt |

| 6 March 36 | Milton Keynes Dons | 3–0 | Doncaster Rovers | Milton Keynes |
| 19:45 GMT | McLeod 40'; Powell 56'; Gleeson 83' | Report | | Stadium: Stadium MK; Attendance: 6,804; Referee: Stroud |

| 9 March 37 | Bournemouth | 1–2 | Doncaster Rovers | Bournemouth |
| 15:00 GMT | Tubbs 86' | Report | 66' Paynter; 87' Husband | Stadium: Dean Court; Attendance: 7,178; Referee: Graham |

| 12 March | Doncaster Rovers | P–P | Carlisle United | Doncaster |
| 19:45 GMT | | Report | | Stadium: Keepmoat Stadium |

| 16 March 38 | Doncaster Rovers | 1–1 | Portsmouth | Doncaster |
| 15:00 GMT | Brown 37' | Report | 75' Wallace | Stadium: Keepmoat Stadium; Attendance: 7,604; Referee: Harrington |

| 23 March 39 | Scunthorpe United | 2–3 | Doncaster Rovers | Scunthorpe |
| 15:00 GMT | Duffy 41'; Hawley 85' | Report | 5' (o.g.) Mirfin; 39' Hume; 48' Brown | Stadium: Glanford Park; Attendance: 5,288; Referee: Mathieson |

| 29 March 40 | Coventry City | 1–0 | Doncaster Rovers | Coventry |
| 15:00 GMT | Christie 13' | Report | | Stadium: Ricoh Arena; Referee: Halsey |

| 1 April 41 | Doncaster Rovers | 1–0 | Swindon Town | Doncaster |
| 12:15 GMT | McCombe 80' | Report | | Stadium: Keepmoat Stadium; Attendance: 8,106; Referee: Tierney |

| 6 April 42 | Doncaster Rovers | 1–0 | Tranmere Rovers | Doncaster |
| 15:00 GMT | Jones 63' | Report | | Stadium: Keepmoat Stadium; Attendance: 7,979; Referee: Coote |

| 9 April 43 | Doncaster Rovers | 0–2 | Carlisle United | Doncaster |
| 19:45 GMT | | Report | 35', 86' Noble | Stadium: Keepmoat Stadium; Attendance: 7,884; Referee: Woolmer |

| 13 April 44 | Crewe Alexandra | 1–2 | Doncaster Rovers | Crewe |
| 15:00 GMT | M Clayton 54' | Report | 66', 70' Paynter | Stadium: Alexandra Stadium; Attendance: 5,465; Referee: Attwell |

| 20 April 45 | Doncaster Rovers | 0–1 | Notts County | Doncaster |
| 15:00 GMT | | Report | 14' Labadie | Stadium: Keepmoat Stadium; Attendance: 12,624; Referee: Phil Gibbs |

| 27 April 46 | Brentford | 0–1 | Doncaster Rovers | Brentford |
| 15:00 GMT | | Report | 90' Coppinger | Stadium: Griffin Park; Attendance: 12,300; Referee: Oliver |

=== FA Cup ===
| 3 November Round 1 | Doncaster Rovers | 3–1 | Bradford Park Avenue | Doncaster |
| 15:00 | Martin Woods 27'; Hume 36'; Brown 76' | Report | 56' Marshall | Stadium: Keepmoat Stadium; Attendance: 4,602; Referee: Jeremy Simpson |

| 1 December Round 2 | Oldham Athletic | 3–1 | Doncaster Rovers | Oldham |
| 15:00 | Wabara 45'; Derbyshire 70', 77' | Report | 4' Blake | Stadium: Boundary Park; Attendance: 2,783; Referee: Miller |

=== Football League Cup ===
| 11 August Round 1 | Doncaster Rovers | 1–1 (a.e.t.) (4–2 p) | York City | Doncaster |
| 15:00 BST | Brown 74' (pen.) | Report | 65' Coulson | Stadium: Keepmoat Stadium; Attendance: 4,937; Referee: Salisbury |
| | Penalties |
| | Brown (penalty scored); M. Woods (penalty scored); Bennett (penalty scored); Blake (penalty scored) | | (penalty missed) Coulson; (penalty scored) Challinor; (penalty scored) Potts; (penalty missed) Blair |

| 28 August Round 2 | Doncaster Rovers | 3–2 | Hull City | Doncaster |
| 19:45 BST | Syers 30', 90'; Jones 57' | Report | 1' McLean; 10' Simpson; (red card) 79' McKenna | Stadium: Keepmoat Stadium; Attendance: 4,703; Referee: Rushton |

| 26 September Round 3 | Norwich City | 1–0 | Doncaster Rovers | Norwich |
| 19:45 BST | Tetty 26' | Report | | Stadium: Carrow Road; Attendance: 13,902; Referee: Deadman |

=== Football League Trophy ===
| 9 October Round 2 | Doncaster Rovers | 1–0 | Chesterfield | Doncaster |
| 19:00 BST | Ball 83' | Report | | Stadium: Keepmoat Stadium; Attendance: 4,030; Referee: James Adock |

| 4 December Quarter Final | Crewe Alexandra | 1–1 (5–3 p) | Doncaster Rovers | Crewe |
| 19:45 BST | Robertson (yellow card) 30'; Pogba 45+2'; Tootle (red card) 90' | Summary | Blake (yellow card) 52'; Brown 90+2' | Stadium: Alexandra Stadium; Attendance: 1,892; Referee: Trevor Kettle |
| | Penalties |
| | Dalla Valle (penalty scored); Davis (penalty scored); Osman (penalty scored); Moore (penalty scored); Robertson (penalty scored) | | (penalty scored) Brown; (penalty scored) Hume; (penalty missed) Blake; (penalty scored) Quinn |
