= Richard Causton =

Richard Causton may refer to:

- Richard Causton, 1st Baron Southwark (1843–1929)
- Richard Causton (composer) (born 1971)
- Richard Causton (author) (born 1920)
