= Andrea Adams =

British journalist (1946–1995)

- Born: Andrea Caroline Hambly; 10 May 1946; Mansfield, Nottinghamshire, England
- Died: 7 November 1995 (aged 49); Downton near Salisbury, England
- Children: Gemini Adams

Andrea Caroline Adams (née Hambly; 10 May 1946 – 7 November 1995) was a British BBC broadcaster and journalist known for programs that she wrote and produced for Radio 4's Does He Take Sugar and Woman's Hour.

== Career ==
The Nottingham-born Adams was the first person to publicize the significance of workplace bullying, which she campaigned against after her 1980s radio program An Abuse of Power which resulted in a flood of mail from the British public. It is believed that she coined the expression "workplace bullying" in 1988. Her book, Bullying at Work: How to Confront and Overcome It, was published in 1992.

== Death and legacy ==
Adams died from ovarian cancer in 1995, aged 49. The Andrea Adams Trust was launched to campaign against workplace bullying, established in her memory. It provided research, a helpline and education. The Trust was responsible for organising the Ban Bullying at Work Day which is held on the anniversary of Adams's death, 7 November each year. In 2008 the Trust was closed down as Chief Executive and Founder Lyn Witheridge retired.

Adams's daughter, British author Gemini Adams, wrote a book entitled, Your Legacy of Love: Realize the Gift in Goodbye, which gives a personal account of her mother's battle with cancer and the insights gained from her bereavement, including the idea that survivors need more than the financial assets that are typically left in a final will and testament.

== Publications by Andrea Adams ==
- Bullying At Work - Book by Andrea Adams & Neil Crawford (1992) ISBN 1-85381-542-X
- Holding out against workplace harassment and bullying. Personnel Management, 48-50 (1992, October).
- The Standard Guide to confronting bullying at work. Nursing Standard. 7:10. 44-46. (1992)
