= Libby Rees =

English author

Libby Rees (born 28 November 1995, Ringwood, Hampshire) is an English author. Rees wrote the book Help Hope and Happiness when she was 9 years old. The book is a self-help guide on how to cope with a parents' break up. The first edition of the book was published in 2005. Her second book, also 60 pages, was At Sixes and Sevens, about progressing from primary school to secondary school. Rees received media coverage including appearing on Richard & Judy and Good Morning America. She received three awards in 2006 for her writing and campaigning; as youth ambassador for Save the Children she was presented a special award by The Princess Royal for inspiring dramatic change in the lives of children. Rees sits on the Youth Board of the Children and Family Court Advisory and Support Service, making sure that children have a voice when it comes to representation in the courts.

== Life ==
Libby Rees wrote the book Help Hope and Happiness (ISBN 1-905517-02-5) when she was 9 years old. The book is a self-help guide on how to cope with a parents' break up. The first edition of the book was published in December 2005 by Aultbea books, who signed a three-book deal with Rees.

Her second book, also 60 pages, was At Sixes and Sevens, about progressing from primary school to secondary school.

Rees received media coverage including appearing on Richard & Judy and Good Morning America. She appeared on CBBC's newsroom special, The Worst Thing Ever, about divorce. She received three awards in 2006 for her writing and campaigning; as youth ambassador for Save the Children she was presented a special award by The Princess Royal for inspiring dramatic change in the lives of children.

Rees also sits on the Youth Board of the Children and Family Court Advisory and Support Service, making sure that children have a voice when it comes to representation in the courts.
