= Jordan Ball =

English footballer

Jordan Darren Ball
Personal information
- Full name: Jordan Darren Ball
- Date of birth: 12 September 1993 (age 33)
- Place of birth: Mansfield, England
- Position: Striker

Team information
- Current team: Ånge IF

Youth career
- 2008–2012: Doncaster Rovers

Senior career*
Years	Team	Apps	(Gls)
2012–2013	Doncaster Rovers	1	(1)
2012	→ Belper Town (loan)	10	(8)
2013	FC Halifax Town	4	(0)
2013	Rainworth Miners Welfare	9	(3)
2013–	Mickleover Sports	3	(2)
2015–	Ånge IF		
- * Club domestic league appearances and goals as of 16:46, 20 May 2013 (UTC)

Jordan Darren Ball (born 12 September 1993 born in Mansfield) is an English footballer who plays as a striker.

== Playing career ==
Ball joined Doncaster Rovers Centre of Excellence in 2008, after being released by Nottingham Forest for being too small. He was part of the Youth Alliance Cup winning Doncaster team in 2012, scoring two goals in the 4–0 win over Exeter City at Exeter. He was offered a one-year professional contract with Doncaster in April 2012. In August, he was loaned out to Belper Town where he scored on his debut against Coalville Town. He returned to Doncaster playing his first senior game for them on 9 October coming on a substitute against Chesterfield in the second round of the Football League Trophy and scored the only goal of the match with his first touch, a header in the 84th minute.

He played in his only Football League game for Doncaster away at Hartlepool United, coming on as sub after 66 minutes, then getting the ball in the net, but disallowed for his foul on the keeper. He was released by Doncaster at the end of their League 1 championship winning season. He was released by Doncaster Rovers at the end of the 2012-13 football season.

In September 2013, Ball signed for FC Halifax Town in the Conference Premier. Ball went straight into the squad for the next day's trip to Forest Green Rovers where he came on as a substitute on 61 minutes in a 2–1 loss. Shortly after signing for Halifax, Ball decided to leave the club due to a lack of first team opportunity. He decided to join Adam Murray (whom he first met with whilst pre season training with Mansfield Town) at local side Rainworth Miners Welfare.

In December 2013 Ball joined Mickleover Sports of the Northern Premier League. He made his debut on 14 December 2013 where he came off the bench for the last 30 minutes in a 1–1 draw.

On 26 December 2013 Ball was handed his first start against Loughborough Dynamo and scored twice in a 3–2 win.

As of February 2015 Ball has signed for Swedish club Ånge IF.
