= Jeremy John Beadle =

Classical music critic and broadcaster

Jeremy John Beadle (28 April 1956 – 27 December 1995) was a British critic, writer, and broadcaster. He was born in York and educated at the York Cathedral choir school and then at St Peter's School, York. He was a presenter on BBC Radio 3. He graduated from Oxford University in 1977 with a BA in Greek and Latin literature.

He died from AIDS-induced complications at the age of 39. Anthony Sellors, in his obituary in The Independent, said that Beadle was "an outstanding example of a breed of cultural critic" who was "able to cross the barrier between serious and popular culture writing on literature, classical music and popular culture".

Beadle was an acclaimed classical music critic. He wrote for the magazine Classic CD and wrote The Virgin Guide to Classical Music in 1993. The book covers the entire gamut of music history. This book was followed by The Age of Romanticism: The Romantic Composers and Their Works in 1995, as his greatest love was the music of the German symphonic tradition. His third book, Will Pop Eat Itself? (1993), on postmodernism in pop music, was noted as a detailed compendium of fact drafted from only a few notes, as his memory was extensive and his knowledge of popular music said to be encyclopaedic. He also published a book on crime, another of his interests, and wrote two murder mystery novels, both set in the London underworld.

== Publications ==
- Death Scene: Thirteen Songs for Guy (1989) Carrier Pigeon. ISBN 978-0-85449-088-2
- Doing Business (1990) Heretic Books. ISBN 978-0-85449-110-0
- Will Pop Eat Itself? (1993) Faber & Faber. ISBN 978-0-57116-241-3
- The Virgin Guide to Classical Music (1993) Virgin Books. ISBN 978-0-86369-658-9
- The Age of Romanticism: The Romantic Composers and Their Works (1995) Future Publishing. ISBN 978-1-85981-070-5
- Inside the Orchestra (1995) ISBN 978-1-85981-010-1
