= Clifford Newby-Harris =

Montserratian footballer

Personal information
- Date of birth: 23 January 1995 (age 31)
- Position: Defender

Team information
- Current team: Bishop's Stortford

Senior career*
Years	Team	Apps	(Gls)
2012	Bishop's Stortford		
2012–2013	Stansted		
2013–	Bishop's Stortford		

International career^{‡}
2012–	Montserrat	2	(0)
- * Club domestic league appearances and goals as of 20:22, 6 January 2015 (UTC) ‡ National team caps and goals as of 20:22, 6 January 2015 (UTC)

Clifford Newby-Harris (born 23 January 1995) is a Montserratian international footballer who plays for English club Bishop's Stortford, as a defender.

== Career ==
Newby-Harris has played club football in England for Bishop's Stortford and Stansted.

He made his international debut for Montserrat in 2012, and competed in 2012 Caribbean Cup qualification.
