= Richard Causton (author) =

British author and businessman (1920–1995)

Richard George Causton
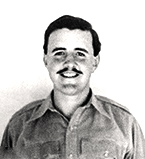
- Richard Causton circa 1946
- Born: February 17, 1920
- Died: January 13, 1995 (aged 74)
- Education: Dulwich College, Royal Military College, Sandhurst
- Occupations: Author, businessman
- Known for: First chairman of SGI-UK
- Notable work: The Buddha in Daily Life
- Spouse: Mitsuko Causton

Richard George Causton MC (17 February 1920 – 13 January 1995) was a British author, businessman, and the first chairman of the Soka Gakkai International in the UK (SGI-UK).

== Early life ==
Causton was born in London on 17 February 1920. Educated at Dulwich College, Causton attended the Royal Military College, Sandhurst. During World War II, at the age of 24, he was stationed on the borders of India and Burma. He served as a Brigade Major of the Allied Forces. In northeast India, he experienced the attacks of the Japanese army. In 1958, he retired from the army.

== Career ==
At 38, Causton began a career in business. After working as Vice General Manager of the department store Harrods in London, he became a representative of Dunhill in the Far East. While in Japan, he met his future wife, Mitsuko, who introduced him to Nichiren Buddhism and the Nichiren Shoshu in Japan. These experiences led him to become a practicing Buddhist in 1971.

In March 1974, Causton moved with Mitsuko to London. In 1975, Nichiren Shoshone UK was officially founded and Causton became its first chairman. He directed numerous cultural activities of NSUK and forged links with the United Nations High Commissioner for Refugees and the Commonwealth Human Ecology Council together with other humanitarian organizations.

In 1995, Causton authored a book about the Nichiren Shoshu and Nichiren Buddhism titled The Buddha in Daily Life.

== Publications ==
- Causton, Richard: Nichiren Shoshu Buddhism, HarperCollins Publishers, 1989; ISBN 9780062501431
- Causton, Richard: The Buddha In Daily Life: An Introduction to the Buddhism of Nichiren Daishonin, Rider Publishing, London, 1995; ISBN 978-0712674560
