= Josh Meade =

English footballer

Personal information
- Full name: Joshua Ryan Meade
- Date of birth: 16 April 1995 (age 31)
- Place of birth: Doncaster, England
- Positions: Midfielder; defender

Team information
- Current team: Buxton

Youth career
- –2013: Doncaster Rovers

Senior career*
Years	Team	Apps	(Gls)
2012–2014	Doncaster Rovers	0	(0)
2014	→ Goole (loan)	4	(0)
2014–2015	Matlock Town		(0)
2015–201?	Stocksbridge Park Steels		
2017–	Buxton		
- * Club domestic league appearances and goals as of 12.00, 9 February 2014

Joshua Ryan Meade (born 16 April 1995) is an English footballer who plays as a defender for Buxton. He previously played for Doncaster Rovers, Goole Stocksbridge Park Steels and Matlock Town.

== Playing career ==
=== Doncaster Rovers ===
Meade was part of the Youth Alliance Cup-winning Doncaster Rovers team in 2012, coming on as substitute and scoring in the last minute in the 4–0 win over Exeter City at Exeter.

While still a member of the youth team, he gained his first team appearance on the bench against Hull City in the Carling cup at the Keepmoat stadium. He then made his first team senior debut in the Football League Trophy area quarter final game against Crewe Alexandra at the Alexandra Stadium on 4 December 2012. He was given a one-year professional contract by the club in July 2013.

Non league Goole signed Meade on loan during the January 2014 transfer window initially on a one-month loan deal.

=== Later career ===
He was released by Doncaster in summer 2014, and signed for Matlock Town. He left the club for Stocksbridge Park Steels a year later. After two years at Stocksbridge in 2017 he signed for Buxton F.C.
