= James Paterson =

James Paterson may refer to:

== Sportsmen ==
- James Paterson (cricketer) (1889–1966), New Zealand cricketer
- James Paterson (footballer) (1905–1978), Scottish international footballer
- James Paterson (rugby league) (1898–1969), English rugby league footballer of the 1920s
- James Paterson (rugby union) (born 1987), New Zealand–American rugby player
- James Paterson (skier) (born 1970), Australian Paralympic skier
- Jamie Paterson (footballer, born 1973), Scottish footballer
- Jamie Paterson (footballer, born 1991), English footballer
- Jim Paterson (footballer) (born 1979), Scottish footballer who is a player-coach for Dunfermline Athletic
- Jim Paterson (rugby league) (1934–2019), Australian rugby league footballer
- Jimmy Paterson (Australian footballer) (1870–1927), Australian rules footballer
- Jimmy Paterson (1891–1959), physician and amateur footballer who played for Queen's Park and Arsenal in the 1920s
- Jim Paterson (athlete) (1934–2012), Scottish runner

== Other ==
- James Hamilton-Paterson (born 1941), British poet, won Newdigate Prize in 1964
- James Paterson (journalist) (1805–1876), Scottish writer and antiquary
- James Paterson (mayor), mayor of Melbourne, 1876–1877
- James Paterson (painter) (1854–1932), Scottish landscape painter
- James Paterson (New Zealand politician) (1807–1886), New Zealand politician
- James Paterson (Australian politician) (born 1987), Australian Senator
- James Paterson (priest), Dean of Argyll and The Isles from 1846 until 1848
- James Paterson (radical), one of the leaders of the Society of the United Scotsmen
- James Ralston Kennedy Paterson (1897–1981), Scottish radiologist

== See also ==
- James Patterson (disambiguation)
