= Aaron Williams (footballer) =

English footballer (born 1993)

Personal information
- Full name: Aaron John Williams
- Date of birth: 21 October 1993 (age 33)
- Place of birth: West Bromwich, England
- Height: 5 ft 11 in (1.80 m)
- Position: Forward

Team information
- Current team: Aberystwyth Town
- Number: 14

Youth career
- 2002–2011: Walsall

Senior career*
Years	Team	Apps	(Gls)
2011–2013	Walsall	7	(0)
2011–2012	→ Redditch United (loan)	3	(0)
2013	→ Romulus (loan)	3	(0)
2013	→ AFC Telford United (loan)	10	(4)
2013–2014	Worcester City	38	(2)
2014–2015	Rushall Olympic	39	(28)
2015–2016	Nuneaton Town (Note: From 2008 to 2018, Nuneaton Borough F.C. were known as Nuneaton Town F.C.)	26	(12)
2016	Peterborough United	10	(2)
2016	→ Nuneaton Town (loan)	21	(7)
2017–2018	Newport County	16	(3)
2017–2018	→ Brackley Town (loan)	20	(15)
2018	Brackley Town	18	(9)
2018–2019	Harrogate Town	34	(5)
2019–2021	AFC Telford United	43	(12)
2021–2025	Newtown	143	(80)
2025–2026	Colwyn Bay	34	(6)
2026–	Aberystwyth Town	11	(9)

International career
2015	England C	1	(0)
- * Club domestic league appearances and goals as of 09:23, 8 November 2026 (UTC)

Aaron John Williams (born 21 October 1993) is an English footballer who plays as a forward for Aberystwyth Town. He previously played in the Football League for Walsall, Peterborough United and Newport County, and is also an England C-team international.

== Club career ==
=== Walsall ===
==== Early career ====
Williams was born in West Bromwich, West Midlands. He grew up in nearby Wednesbury and attended Wodensborough Community Technology College, supporting Birmingham City as a youngster. He joined Walsall as an eight-year-old and later trained with Manchester United (as the clubs had a partnership at the time), but opted to remain with Walsall to stay close to home and get more game time. He eventually worked his way through the ranks at the Bescot Stadium, scoring 22 league goals for the youth team in the 2011–12 season.

===== Redditch United loan =====
He joined up with Redditch United on a work experience loan deal in late 2011 and made his debut in a 1–0 loss to Stourbridge on 26 December. At Redditch, Williams operated as a Utility player, notably playing as a centre-back in a January 2012 game against Leamington. The side also looked to utilise his long throwing ability. He played a total of three games for Redditch before signing a one-year professional contract with Walsall ahead of the 2012–13 season.

==== 2012–13 season ====
He was later handed the #19 shirt and made his professional debut as a second-half substitute for Nicky Featherstone on 21 August 2012 against Oldham Athletic. Williams made a total of eight appearances for Walsall in 2012, six of which came in league fixtures.

===== Romulus and AFC Telford United loans =====
On 2 January 2013, Williams joined non-league side Romulus on a one-month loan deal. He played his first game for the club that day, a 1–1 draw with Sutton Coldfield Town. After three appearances for Romulus, he returned to Walsall. Following Walsall's good form towards the latter stages of the 2012–13 season, Williams struggled to break into the first team and was again sent out on loan.

On 6 March 2013 he signed for AFC Telford United of the Conference National in an initial one-month loan deal, wearing the number 20 shirt. His debut came in a 0–2 home loss to Macclesfield Town on 9 March 2013.

Williams scored the first professional goal of his career for Telford against Woking in a 5–2 away defeat on 16 March 2013. Despite the club being relegated from the Conference National on 30 March 2013, Walsall allowed Williams to remain with Telford until the end of the season to gain valuable playing experience. On 13 April 2013 he scored a hat-trick in just 17 minutes of play in an away game against Ebbsfleet United. Williams' three goals helped the club come back from a one-goal deficit to claim a 3–1 win. This victory ended Telford's 30-game run without a league win and condemned Ebbsfleet United to relegation from the Football Conference. In total, Williams played 10 games for Telford and managed to score 4 goals in all competitions.

Williams returned to Walsall but was released at the end of the season, alongside George Bowerman, Richard Taundry, Connor Taylor and Jake Jones.

=== Worcester City ===
Following the club's relegation new Telford manager Liam Watson offered Williams the chance to rejoin the club for pre-season training in a bid to try and earn a contract, however a permanent deal never materialised. Later in the summer of 2013, Williams went on trial with another Conference North side, Worcester City. He played in friendly fixtures against Nuneaton Town, Stourport Swifts, Westfields and Loughborough University, scoring against the latter. On 31 July 2013, after impressing whilst on trial at the club, Worcester City announced that they had signed Williams for the 2013–14 season.

Williams started the season as a part of manager Carl Heeley's new-look, younger Worcester side, playing alongside the likes of former Aston Villa youth prospect Ebby Nelson-Addy and former Walsall teammate Richard Taundry. On 26 October 2013, Williams scored his first goal for Worcester City, opening the scoring in an FA Cup Fourth Road Qualifying game against Conference National side Lincoln City. A late Andrew Boyce goal denied Worcester the victory, but Worcester earned a replay at Sincil Bank (which was ultimately lost 3–0 three days later).

On 3 December 2013, Williams scored against his former club AFC Telford United in an FA Trophy First round replay at the New Bucks Head. His goal was Worcester's third in a 3–0 victory. The second goal of the game was initially reported by Telford's website as an Aaron Williams goal, but Worcester later confirmed that it had been awarded to his teammate Ellis Deeney. Williams' first league goal of the season was Worcester's second in a 2–1 home victory against Colwyn Bay on 18 January 2014. Williams came off the bench to score the winning goal for Worcester on 1 March 2014, heading in a Steven Leslie cross with ten minutes remaining in a 2–1 home victory over Stalybridge Celtic. On 18 March 2014, manager Carl Heeley opted for a much-changed, youthful line-up against Williams' former club Redditch United in the Worcestershire Senior Cup. Williams was named as Worcester captain for the game, however he could not prevent a 2–0 Redditch victory.

Williams played a total of 49 times for Worcester during the 2013–14 season in all competitions, scoring 4 goals. 39 appearances and 2 goals were achieved in the league.

He was offered a new contract with the club in the summer of 2014, and joined up with the squad ahead of the new season. However, he did not feature in any of Worcester's opening games of the season.

=== Rushall Olympic ===
On 2 September 2014 Williams signed for Rushall Olympic, managed by former Ajax, West Bromwich Albion and Bolton Wanderers player Richard Sneekes. He went straight in to the squad for the club's away game with Barwell that day and was an unused substitute. He made his début five days later in a 3–2 away win against Curzon Ashton.

Williams started his Pics career in positive form, plying his trade up front alongside former Kidderminster Harriers striker Aaron Farrell. He scored in the league games against King's Lynn Town and Ilkeston and in the FA Cup against Tamworth before netting twice in a 2–1 victory over Belper Town on 7 October.

Williams' next goal for the club came from the penalty spot on 1 November 2014, as Rushall overcame Cambridge City 2–0 in the First qualifying round of the FA Trophy. He followed this up seven days later with Rushall's third goal in a 3–0 league win over Buxton. The striker's good form continued in Rushall's 5–0 victory over Stratford Town in the FA Trophy Second qualifying round on 15 November. Williams scored a hat-trick, claiming the match ball as well as reaching 10 goals in his first 17 appearances in all competitions for the club.

Williams scored to put Rushall Olympic 1–0 up against Conference North side Guiseley in the Third qualifying round of the FA Trophy on 2 December 2014. Guiseley hit back with two goals, and Williams had the chance to equalise from the penalty spot but ultimately saw his effort saved by Guiseley goalkeeper Steven Drench.

On 16 December, Williams came on as a second-half substitute in Rushall's Birmingham Senior Cup First round game away to Stourbridge. Rushall won 5–3 after extra time following a 2–2 draw after 90 minutes; Williams scored twice after the 120th minute to send his side through. He scored another two goals in Rushall's 3–0 Boxing Day win over Trafford and further one against Stourbridge on New Year's Day. Williams was provided an assist by former Birmingham City, Coventry City and Nottingham Forest striker Dele Adebola on 10 January 2015, but his tenth league goal of the season was ultimately a consolation as Rushall went down 3–1 at home to Ilkeston. Williams then opened the scoring against Workington on 17 January but Rushall went on to lose 3–2.

Williams netted his 20th and 21st goals of the season on 20 January against Sutton Coldfield Town in the Birmingham Senior Cup. His good scoring form continued, with his 20th league (30th overall) goal of the season coming in the form of a winning goal from 35 yards against Nantwich Town on 23 March. Rushall Olympic lost 3–2 away at Witton Albion on 24 March but Williams' two goals were enough to promote him to joint-top scorer in the Northern Premier League Premier Division with 22, alongside Liam Hardy of Buxton. His goalscoring exploits continued until the end of the campaign: his goal in Rushall's 2–1 win away at Ashton United on the final day of the season was his 28th league goal of the season (and 38th overall). This crowned him the top scorer of the Northern Premier League Premier Division for 2014–15. In May 2015, Williams was rewarded for his efforts at Rushall Olympic's end-of-season awards ceremony. The striker was named Supporters' Player of the Season, Players' Player of the Season and Golden Boot Top Goalscorer – and also picked up the club's Goal of the Season award for his long-range strike against Nantwich Town in March 2015.

=== Nuneaton Town ===
In the summer of 2015, Williams re-joined former club Walsall for pre-season training after accepting an invitation from manager Dean Smith. However, on 6 July 2015, the striker signed a two-year contract with Nuneaton Town of the National League North.

He scored on his full début, a 3–2 away win at Chorley. He followed this up with the winning goal in a 1–0 win over Lowestoft Town, which was Nuneaton's fourth consecutive victory. Williams' start to life in a Nuneaton shirt was positive, scoring 5 goals in his first 10 games in an attacking partnership alongside veteran striker Marlon Harewood.

Williams continued to impress in to the new year, and by late January 2016 had scored 16 goals in 32 appearances in all competitions for Nuneaton. This good form attracted the attention of third-tier side Peterborough United, who took Williams and Nuneaton teammate Zeus de la Paz on a week's trial.

=== Peterborough United ===
==== 2015–16 season ====
On 23 January 2016, Williams returned to the Football League by signing for League One club Peterborough United. He signed on the same day as Nuneaton teammate Callum Chettle. Signed by Graham Westley's, Williams played 10 games in total; he scored goals against Port Vale and Doncaster Rovers. However, he soon became surplus to requirements at the club following Westley's departure and did not appear for the first team at all at the beginning of the new season.

==== 2016–17 season: loan return to Nuneaton Town ====
On 4 August 2016, Williams returned to former club Nuneaton Town on loan, signing a contract until January 2017. He moved on the same day as Peterborough United teammate Jordan Nicholson, who also joined Nuneaton on loan. Two days later he scored on his full competitive return, Nuneaton's first goal in a 2–3 loss to Halifax Town. Williams went on to score a total of 7 goals at Nuneaton during his loan spell.

=== Newport County ===
On 1 January 2017 Williams joined League Two club Newport County on a free transfer, signing an 18-month contract. Williams was reunited with Graham Westley, who had signed him a year earlier at Peterborough United. He made his Newport debut on 2 January in the starting line-up for the League Two fixture versus Wycombe Wanderers. At the time of his arrival, the club were struggling at the bottom end of the league table and appeared to be destined for relegation from the Football League.

Williams scored his first goal for Newport on 28 January 2017 in a 3–1 win versus Hartlepool United in League Two. He later scored in a 1–1 draw with Morecambe and also scored a consolation goal in a 6–1 loss to Plymouth Arygle. While struggling to find consistency in front of goal, Williams continued to appear for Newport's first team and was part of the squad the club's famous "Great Escape". Newport avoided relegation on the last day of the season at the expense of Hartlepool United. After being 11 points adrift in March the club managed to win 7 games out of 12 to survive. However, at the beginning of the next season Williams again found himself out of favour and was sent out on loan.

==== Loan to Brackley Town ====
On 15 August 2017, Williams joined Brackley Town in an initial six-month loan deal. During the loan spell Williams experienced a return to goalscoring form, and managed 23 goals in all competitions for Brackley. Williams was reunited with former Nuneaton Town team-mate Shane Byrne at the club.

=== Brackley Town ===
Williams' contract at Newport County was terminated on 12 January 2018 by mutual consent. The following day, he signed a permanent contract with Brackley Town. He managed to continue his goalscoring exploits with 6 goals in his first 7 league games back at the Northamptonshire side.

Williams was part of the side that qualified for the Northamptonshire Senior Cup Final on 6 February 2018 with a 10–9 penalties victory over Peterborough Sports (the game ended 0–0 in normal time). Further cup success followed on 25 March in the 2017–18 FA Trophy Semi-Final as Williams scored the opening goal in the second leg against Wealdstone. Brackley won 2–0 on the day and 3–0 on aggregate to book their place in the Final, gifting the club their first ever game at Wembley Stadium.

Williams' goalscoring form did not cease there; his strike against Boston United on 27 March 2018, Brackley's third in a 4–1 league victory, was his 33rd goal of the season in all competitions across his two spells at the club.

The striker wasn't selected in the squad for the Northamptonshire Senior Cup final against Kettering Town on 10 May 2018, as Brackley rotated their squad to manage a busy period of fixtures encompassing three finals in ten days. Kettering lifted the trophy after winning the game 2–1.

He did play in the National League North Promotion Play-Off Final on 13 May, but Brackley were again unsuccessful as Harrogate Town secured a 3–0 victory and promotion to the National League.

Williams did go on to win the 2018 FA Trophy Final with Brackley on 20 May 2018, playing the entire game at Wembley Stadium and scoring in the penalty shootout.

=== Harrogate Town ===
Williams spent the 2018–19 season with newly promoted National League side Harrogate Town. Despite the club performing above expectations and finishing in the promotion play-off positions, Williams struggled for game time throughout the season. He left the club after one year, during which he scored 5 goals across 34 league appearances.

=== Return to AFC Telford United ===
On 17 June 2019, six years after a short loan spell with the club, Williams signed a two-year contract with National League North side AFC Telford United.

Williams' two years back at Telford saw him in and out of the side, with both seasons cut short due to the COVID-19 pandemic.

Williams and teammate Courtney Meppen-Walter were both released by Telford on 12 May 2021, following the expiry of their contracts. Williams scored 12 goals in 43 National League North appearances for the Shropshire side.

=== Newtown ===
In June 2021, Williams signed with Cymru Premier team Newtown.

==== 2021–22 season ====
His full debut for the club came on 8 July 2021 in the UEFA Europa Conference League as Newtown lost 4–0 away at Irish side Dundalk. Williams played the full 90 minutes in the first qualifying round first leg at Oriel Park. Five days later, he also played the full return leg as Newtown were beaten 1–0 at Park Hall Stadium (5–0 on aggregate).

His first domestic appearance for the club came in the Welsh League Cup on 7 August 2021, away at Cambrian & Clydach Vale. Williams scored all four goals in a 4–2 Newtown victory.

Williams scored on his league debut at Latham Park on 15 August 2021, albeit in a 1–4 defeat to The New Saints. Six days later, he followed this up with the equaliser in Newtown's 1–1 draw at Penybont.

Towards the end of August, he scored a goal in each game as Newtown overcame Caernarfon Town and Cefn Druids 2–0 and 5–0 respectively in the league. On 4 September, Williams came off the bench in the Welsh League Cup against Berriew to score a hat-trick. The three goals, scored within ten minutes of each other, meant Williams had scored eleven goals in his first eight games for Newtown.

After two league games without a goal, the striker dropped to the bench for the third round Welsh League Cup match at home to Caernarfon Town on 21 September. Williams was substituted on in the second half, and scored Newtown's fourth goal of their 5–0 win within two minutes of entering the game.

On 25 September, Williams scored his thirteenth goal of the season from the penalty spot in the Welsh Cup against Carmarthen Town, but Newtown lost 4–5 on penalties after a 1–1 draw in normal time. On 2 October he secured his third hat-trick of the season with all three goals in a 3–0 away win at Barry Town United. He scored another hat-trick on 5 November in Newtown's 5–0 away league win at Cefn Druids.

In the absence of regular captain Craig Williams, Aaron was named Newtown captain for the league matches away at The New Saints on 19 November and at home to Barry Town United on 4 December.

Williams was part of the starting line-up on 19 February 2022 for the home game against Cardiff Metropolitan University, as Newtown celebrated their 1000th fixture in Cymru Premier history.

He ended the season as the second-highest goalscorer in the Cymru Premier that term with 17 goals from 30 appearances, trailing only Declan McManus of The New Saints who scored 24 in 28. Williams' goals helped Newtown achieve a third-place finish in the league and subsequently qualification to the UEFA Europa Conference League for a second consecutive season.

==== 2022–23 season ====
Williams' first appearance of the new season came on 7 July, as Newtown were beaten 1–0 away from home against Havnar Bóltfelag of the Faroe Islands in the UEFA Europa Conference League. He also appeared in the second leg at home against HB a week later, which Newtown won 2–1 in 90 minutes and subsequently 4–2 on penalties.

The striker appeared in the first leg of the next round, as Newtown were beaten 1–4 away at Spartak Trnava of Slovakia on 21 July. Williams scored his first goal in European football in the second leg on 28 July, opening the scoring from the penalty spot, however Newtown ultimately lost 1–2 on the night and 2–6 on aggregate.

=== Colwyn Bay ===
In June 2025 he signed for Colwyn Bay after they returned to the Cymru Premier. He departed from the club at the end of the season.

=== Aberystwyth Town ===
In June 2026 he signed for Cymru South club Aberystwyth Town.

== International career ==
Williams' goalscoring exploits at Rushall Olympic attracted the attention of England C manager Paul Fairclough at the end of the 2014–15 season. On 16 May 2015, Williams was named in the squad to take on the Republic of Ireland's under-21 team in a friendly in Galway on 1 June. The striker came on as a second-half substitute in England's 2–1 win.

== Career statistics ==
As of 31 December 2022.

Appearances and goals by club, season and competition
Club	Season	League			National Cup (Note: Includes appearance(s) in the FA Cup and Welsh Cup.)		League Cup (Note: Includes appearance(s) in the EFL Cup and Welsh League Cup.)		Other (Note: Appearance(s) in other miscellaneous competitions, including FA Trophy, UEFA Europa Conference League and regional tournaments such as the Birmingham, Worcestershire and Northamptonshire Senior Cups.)		Total	
Club	Season	Division	Apps	Goals	Apps	Goals	Apps	Goals	Apps	Goals	Apps	Goals
Walsall	2011–12	League One	0	0	0	0	0	0	0	0	0	0
Walsall	2012–13	League One	6	0	2	0	0	0	0	0	8	0
Walsall	Total		6	0	2	0	0	0	0	0	8	0
Redditch United (loan)	2011–12	Southern League Premier Division	3	0	0	0	—		—		3	0
Romulus (loan)	2012–13	Northern Premier League Division One South	3	0	0	0	—		0	0	3	0
AFC Telford United (loan)	2012–13	Conference National	10	4	0	0	—		0	0	10	4
Worcester City	2013–14	Conference North	38	2	5	1	—		5	1	48	4
Worcester City	2014–15	Conference North	0	0	0	0	—		0	0	0	0
Worcester City	Total		38	2	5	1	0	0	5	1	48	4
Rushall Olympic	2014–15	Northern Premier League Premier Division	39	28	2	1	—		10	9	51	38
Nuneaton Town	2015–16	National League North	26	12	2	2	—		4	2	32	16
Peterborough United	2015–16	League One	10	2	0	0	0	0	0	0	10	2
Nuneaton Town (loan)	2016–17	National League North	21	7	0	0	—		8	0	29	7
Newport County	2016–17	League Two	17	3	0	0	0	0	0	0	17	3
Brackley Town (loan)	2017–18	National League North	20	15	4	3	—		4	5	28	23
Brackley Town	2017–18	National League North	18	9	—		—		8	4	26	13
Harrogate Town	2018–19	National League	34	5	2	0	0	0	2	0	38	5
AFC Telford United	2019–20	National League North	32	8	0	0	—		1	0	33	8
AFC Telford United	2020–21	National League North	11	4	0	0	—		2	5	13	9
AFC Telford United	Total		43	12	0	0	0	0	3	5	46	17
Newtown	2021–22	Cymru Premier	30	17	2	4	3	6	2	0	37	27
Newtown	2022–23	Cymru Premier	20	13	2	2	1	0	4	1	27	16
Newtown	Total		50	30	4	6	4	6	6	1	64	43
Career total			334	126	21	13	4	6	50	27	413	175

== Honours ==
=== Club ===
==== Brackley Town ====
- FA Trophy: 2017–18
- Northamptonshire Senior Cup runner-up: 2017–18
- National League North play-offs runner-up: 2017–18

=== Individual ===
- Northern Premier League Premier Division Golden Boot: 2014–15 (28 goals)
- Rushall Olympic Supporters' Player of the Season: 2014–15
- Rushall Olympic Players' Player of the Season: 2014–15
- Rushall Olympic Golden Boot Top Goalscorer: 2014–15 (38 goals)
- Rushall Olympic Goal of the Season: 2014–15 (vs. Nantwich Town on 21 March 2015)
