= James Patterson (disambiguation) =

James Patterson (born 1947) is an American author.

James or Jim Patterson may also refer to:

== Politicians ==
- James Patterson (New Jersey politician) (1794–1867), American Democratic Party politician from New Jersey
- James Patterson (Australian politician) (1833–1895), Australian colonial politician, 17th Premier of Victoria
- James W. Patterson (1823–1893), United States Senator from New Hampshire
- James Colebrooke Patterson (1839–1929), Canadian politician
- James O. Patterson (1857–1911), U.S. Representative from South Carolina
- James T. Patterson (politician) (1908–1989), U.S. Representative from Connecticut
- J. O. Patterson Jr. (James Oglethorpe Patterson, 1935–2011), American bishop and mayor of Memphis, Tennessee
- Jim Patterson (California politician) (born 1948), member of California State Assembly since 2012
- Jim Patterson (Alabama politician) (1950–2017), U.S. representative from Alabama
- James G. Patterson, member of the Mississippi House of Representatives, 1874–1875

== Sport ==
- Jim Patterson (Scottish footballer) (1928–2012), record goal scorer with Scottish club, Queen of the South
- Jim Patterson (cricketer) (born 1959), Irish cricketer
- Jim Patterson (Australian footballer) (1919–1994), Australian rules footballer
- Jim Patterson Stadium, baseball stadium in Louisville named for the founder of Long John Silvers, Kentucky, opened in 2005

== Writers ==
- James Lloydovich Patterson (1933–2025), Russian writer of African-American descent
- James T. Patterson (historian) (born 1935), American historian
- Jim Patterson (screenwriter) (fl. 2010s–2020s), American producer and screenwriter

== Others ==
- James Kennedy Patterson (1833–1922), Scottish-American academic administrator
- James John Patterson (1859–1937), New Zealand blacksmith, farmer and landowner
- James Joseph Patterson (1923–1992), American newspaper executive
- James Laird Patterson (1822–1902), British Roman Catholic bishop
- James Patterson (actor) (1932–1972), American actor
- Jimmy Patterson, the main character of Medal of Honor video game series
- "Big" Jim Paterson (fl. 1970s–2020s), trombonist of Dexys Midnight Runners

== See also ==
- Big Jim Patterson (disambiguation)
- James Paterson (disambiguation)
- Jamie Patterson (disambiguation)
