= Richard Taundry =

English footballer

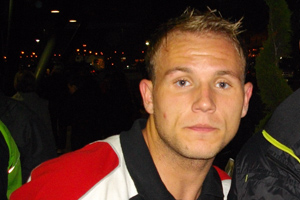

Personal information
- Full name: Richard Daniel Taundry
- Date of birth: 15 February 1989 (age 37)
- Place of birth: Walsall, England
- Positions: Defender; midfielder

Senior career*
| Years | Team | Apps | (Gls) |
| 2007–2013 | Walsall | 169 | (3) |
| 2013 | Pelsall Villa | | (2) |
| 2013–2014 | Worcester City | 17 | (0) |
| 2014–2015 | Solihull Moors | 30 | (0) |
| 2015–2018 | Leamington | 120 | (3) |
- * Club domestic league appearances and goals as of 16:51, 18 December 2017 (UTC)

Richard Daniel Taundry (born 15 February 1989) is a professional footballer who last played for National League North side Leamington, where he played as both a defender and a midfielder. He is perhaps best known for making 192 appearances for Walsall, the club at which he started his career.

== Career ==
=== Early career ===
Taundry is a versatile player who can play in a number of positions including right back, right midfield and left back. He progressed through the centre of excellence and youth team at Walsall. He played as a full back the majority of the time in his younger days in the youth and reserves, however when he made the step-up to the first team he was played in midfield while also standing in at left-back on a number of occasions.

=== Walsall ===
Taundry failed to break into the first team during Walsall's title winning 2006–07 season, however he was involved in the youth team's success, despite suffering injuries which kept him out for the majority of the season. Walsall youth team managed to complete an impressive league and cup double.

Taundry made the break through into Walsall's first team during the 2007–08 campaign where manager, Richard Money handed him his debut after coming on as a late substitute for Ishmel Demontagnac in the 82nd minute against Luton Town on 17 November 2007.

During the 2008–09 season, Taundry had a new manager to impress, Jimmy Mullen, who replaced Money, who quit the club towards the end of the 2007–08 campaign.

He was offered a new contract by the club on 10 May 2010. Taundry signed a new one-year contract with Walsall on 6 July 2012.

On 9 May 2013, Taundry was released by Walsall along with George Bowerman, Connor Taylor, Aaron Williams and Jake Jones.

=== Non-League ===
==== Pelsall Villa ====
Taundry joined local club Pelsall Villa on 5 August 2013 in a bid to keep fit whilst on the lookout for a new club. He registered as a player, allowing him to play in competitive matches for the Midland Combination Premier Division club. His first appearance came as a second-half substitute in a 3–1 loss to Bolehall Swifts on 7 August. He scored his first goal for Pelsall Villa on 22 August 2013, the winner in a 4–3 victory against Coventry Copsewood. He scored again for the club in a win against Pilkington XXX.

==== Worcester City ====
In September 2013, following his period at Pelsall Villa, Taundry signed for Conference North side Worcester City, joining up with former Walsall teammate Aaron Williams. He went on to make a total of 26 appearances for Worcester in the 2013–14 season, 17 of which came in the Conference North. He also scored once for the club, in a 4–0 home win over Coventry Sphinx in the FA Cup on 28 September 2013.

After losing his place in the team to recent signing Aaron Brown in a move that saw an upturn in Worcester's league form, Taundry submitted a transfer request.

==== Solihull Moors ====
Taundry joined Solihull Moors on 7 February 2014.

== Career statistics ==
As of match played 9 July 2018

Appearances and goals by club, season and competition
| Club | Season | League | | | FA Cup | | League Cup | | Other | | Total | |
| Club | Season | Division | Apps | Goals | Apps | Goals | Apps | Goals | Apps | Goals | Apps | Goals |
|---|---|---|---|---|---|---|---|---|---|---|---|---|
| Walsall | 2007–08 | League One | 21 | 0 | 1 | 0 | 0 | 0 | 0 | 0 | 22 | 0 |
| Walsall | 2008–09 | League One | 38 | 0 | 1 | 0 | 1 | 0 | 2 (Note: Appearances in the Football League Trophy) | 0 | 42 | 0 |
| Walsall | 2009–10 | League One | 30 | 3 | 0 | 0 | 1 | 0 | 1 | 0 | 32 | 3 |
| Walsall | 2010–11 | League One | 28 | 0 | 3 | 0 | 1 | 0 | 1 | 0 | 33 | 0 |
| Walsall | 2011–12 | League One | 35 | 0 | 4 | 0 | 1 | 0 | 2 | 1 | 42 | 1 |
| Walsall | 2012–13 | League One | 17 | 0 | 2 | 1 | 1 | 0 | 1 | 1 | 21 | 1 |
| Walsall | Walsall total | | 169 | 3 | 11 | 1 | 5 | 0 | 7 | 1 | 192 | 5 |
| Pelsall Villa | 2013–14 | MFC – Premier Division | ? | ? | ? | ? | — | | ? | ? | ? | ? |
| Worcester City | 2013–14 | Conference North | 17 | 0 | 2 | 0 | — | | 3 (Note: Appearances in the FA Trophy) | 0 | 22 | 0 |
| Solihull Moors | 2013–14 | Conference North | 10 | 0 | 0 | 0 | — | | 0 | 0 | 10 | 0 |
| Solihull Moors | 2014–15 | Conference North | 20 | 0 | 0 | 0 | — | | 1 | 0 | 21 | 0 |
| Solihull Moors | Solihull total | | 30 | 0 | 0 | 0 | 0 | 0 | 1 | 0 | 31 | 0 |
| Leamington | 2014–15 | Conference North | 6 | 0 | 0 | 0 | — | | 0 | 0 | 6 | 0 |
| Leamington | 2015–16 | SFL – Premier Division | 44 | 1 | 2 | 0 | — | | 11 (Note: Three appearances in the Southern League Cup; one appearance in the Birmingham Senior Cup; five appearances and a goal in the FA Trophy; two appearances in the Southern League Premier Division play-offs) | 1 | 57 | 2 |
| Leamington | 2016–17 | SFL – Premier Division | 43 | 2 | 0 | 0 | — | | 10 (Note: Two appearances in the Southern League Cup, one in the FA Trophy, five in the Birmingham Senior Cup and two in the Southern League Premier Division play-offs) | 0 | 53 | 2 |
| Leamington | 2017–18 | National League North | 27 | 0 | 0 | 0 | — | | 1 | 0 | 28 | 0 |
| Leamington | Leamington total | | 120 | 3 | 2 | 0 | 0 | 0 | 22 | 1 | 144 | 4 |
| Career totals | | | 336 | 6 | 15 | 1 | 5 | 0 | 33 | 2 | 389 | 9 |
