= 2012–13 Walsall F.C. season =

Walsall
2012–2013 season
- Manager: Dean Smith
- Stadium: Bescot Stadium
- League One: 9th
- FA Cup: First round
- League Cup: Second round
- FL Trophy: Second round

During the 2012-13 season, the British football club Walsall F.C. was managed by Dean Smith. The captain was Andy Butler.

== Competitions ==
=== League One ===
Pos	Team	Pld	W	D	L	GF	GA	GD	Pts
7	Leyton Orient	46	21	8	17	55	48	+7	71
8	Milton Keynes Dons	46	19	13	14	62	45	+17	70
9	Walsall	46	17	17	12	65	58	+7	68
10	Crawley Town	46	18	14	14	59	58	+1	68
11	Tranmere Rovers	46	19	10	17	58	48	+10	67

Updated to match(es) played on 27 April 2013. Source: BBC Sport
Rules for classification: 1) Points; 2) Goal difference; 3) Number of goals scored

==== Results ====
League One match details
Date	Opponents	Venue	Result	Score F–A	Scorers	Attendance	Ref.
18 August 2012	Doncaster Rovers	H	L	0–3		4,205	
21 August 2012	Oldham Athletic	A	D	1–1	Bowerman 79'	3,496	
25 August 2012	Notts County	A	W	1–0	Butler 80'	5,851	
1 September 2012	Brentford	H	D	2–2	Paterson 28', Bowerman 29'	3,434	
8 September 2012	Milton Keynes Dons	H	W	1–0	Holden 17'	3,657	
15 September 2012	Portsmouth	A	W	2–1	Baxendale 56', Cuvelier 63'	11,767	
18 September 2012	Stevenage	A	L	1–3	Bowerman 59'	2,634	
22 September 2012	Preston North End	H	W	3–1	Baxendale 38', Bowerman 55' pen., 58'	4,189	
29 September 2012	Bournemouth	A	W	2–1	Butler 41', Bowerman 90'	4,951	
2 October 2012	Leyton Orient	H	L	1–2	Grigg 58' pen.	3,281	
6 October 2012	Carlisle United	H	L	1–2	Paterson 17'	3,964	
14 October 2012	Shrewsbury Town	A	L	0–1		6,495	
20 October 2012	Crewe Alexandra	H	D	2–2	Paterson 12', Cuvelier 26'	3,836	
23 October 2012	Sheffield United	A	L	0–1		15,744	
27 October 2012	Bury	A	D	1–1	Grigg 7'	2,514	
6 November 2012	Scunthorpe United	H	L	1–4	Grigg 90+2'	2,787	
10 November 2012	Swindon Town	H	L	0–2		4,139	
17 November 2012	Crawley Town	A	D	2–2	Brandy 14', Hemmings 74'	3,039	
20 November 2012	Tranmere Rovers	A	D	0–0		4,717	
24 November 2012	Hartlepool United	H	D	1–1	Holden 49'	4,562	
8 December 2012	Coventry City	A	L	1–5	Adams 16' o.g.	10,986	
15 December 2012	Yeovil Town	H	D	2–2	Paterson 13', Grigg 72'	3,160	
22 December 2012	Colchester United	H	W	1–0	Brandy 61'	3,006	
26 December 2012	Milton Keynes Dons	A	W	4–2	Brandy 15', Grigg 25', 43', Paterson 90+2'	8,700	
29 December 2012	Leyton Orient	A	L	1–2	Mantom 79'	3,865	
1 January 2013	Stevenage	H	W	1–0	Paterson 87'	3,301	
4 January 2013	Portsmouth	H	W	2–0	Brandy 29', Grigg 40'	4,038	
13 January 2013	Preston North End	A	W	3–1	Brandy 18', Downing 38', Baxendale 56'	9,823	
19 January 2013	Bournemouth	H	W	3–1	Mantom 27', Grigg 45+4' pen., 79' pen.	3,173	
26 January 2013	Colchester United	A	L	0–2		2,865	
2 February 2013	Oldham Athletic	H	W	3–1	Baxendale 40', Paterson 74', 90+4'	4,672	
9 February 2013	Doncaster Rovers	A	W	2–1	Butler 2', Brandy 81'	7,013	
16 February 2013	Notts County	H	D	1–1	Grigg 29' pen.	4,416	
23 February 2013	Brentford	A	D	0–0		4,781	
26 February 2013	Carlisle United	A	W	3–0	Grigg 3' pen., 66', 86'	3,266	
2 March 2013	Shrewsbury Town	H	W	3–1	Grigg 30' pen., 54', Westcarr 47'	5,496	
9 March 2013	Swindon Town	A	D	2–2	Grigg 32' pen., Paterson 90'	8,407	
12 March 2013	Tranmere Rovers	H	W	2–0	Grigg 50' pen., Westcarr 57'	3,775	
16 March 2013	Crawley Town	H	D	2–2	Paterson 90', Grigg 90+2'	5,003	
23 March 2013	Hartlepool United	A	D	0–0		3,065	
29 March 2013	Yeovil Town	A	D	0–0		5,594	
1 April 2013	Coventry City	H	W	4–0	Paterson 33', 87', Westcarr 54' pen., 74'	7,504	
6 April 2013	Sheffield United	H	D	1–1	Westcarr 44'	7,042	
13 April 2013	Scunthorpe United	A	D	1–1	Grigg 54'	4,049	
20 April 2013	Bury	H	D	1–1	Brandy 21'	4,745	
27 April 2013	Crewe Alexandra	A	L	0–2		6,547	

=== FA Cup ===
FA Cup match details
Round	Date	Opponents	Venue	Result	Score F–A	Scorers	Attendance	Ref.
First round	3 November 2012	Lincoln City	A	D	1–1	Bowerman 87'	2,032	
First round replay	13 November 2012	Lincoln City	H	L	2–3 (a.e.t.)	Taundry 81', Paterson 120+2'	1,762	

=== League Cup ===
League Cup match details
Round	Date	Opponents	Venue	Result	Score F–A	Scorers	Attendance	Ref.
First round	11 August 2012	Brentford	H	W	1–0	Hemmings 8'	2,248	
Second round	28 August 2012	Queens Park Rangers	A	L	0–3		6,129	

=== Football League Trophy ===
Football League Trophy match details
Round	Date	Opponents	Venue	Result	Score F–A	Scorers	Attendance	Ref.
Second round	9 October 2012	Port Vale	H	D	2–2 (a.e.t.) (5–6 p)	Cuvelier 26' pen., Grigg 47'	2,845	

== First-team squad ==
Squad at end of season

Note: Flags indicate national team as defined under FIFA eligibility rules; some limited exceptions apply. Players may hold more than one non-FIFA nationality.

No.	Pos.	Nation	Player
2	DF	(England) ENG	Richard Taundry
4	DF	(England) ENG	Andy Butler (captain)
5	DF	(England) ENG	Dean Holden
6	MF	(England) ENG	Nicky Featherstone
7	MF	(England) ENG	Adam Chambers
9	FW	(Northern Ireland) NIR	Will Grigg
10	MF	(England) ENG	Jamie Paterson
11	FW	(England) ENG	Ashley Hemmings
12	FW	(England) ENG	Febian Brandy
13	GK	(England) ENG	Richard Jones
14	DF	(England) ENG	Ben Purkiss
15	FW	(England) ENG	Connor Taylor
16	MF	(England) ENG	Jake Jones
17	FW	(England) ENG	George Bowerman

No.	Pos.	Nation	Player
18	DF	(England) ENG	Ben George
19	FW	(England) ENG	Aaron Williams
20	DF	(England) ENG	Mal Benning
21	MF	(England) ENG	Kieron Morris
22	DF	(England) ENG	Paul Downing
24	MF	(England) ENG	James Baxendale
25	DF	(England) ENG	James Chambers
26	DF	(England) ENG	Andy Taylor
27	MF	(England) ENG	Sam Mantom
28	GK	(England) ENG	Sam Johnstone (on loan from Manchester United)
29	FW	(England) ENG	Craig Westcarr
31	GK	(England) ENG	Liam Roberts
33	MF	(Saint Kitts and Nevis) SKN	Romaine Sawyers (on loan from West Bromwich Albion)

=== Left club during season ===
Note: Flags indicate national team as defined under FIFA eligibility rules; some limited exceptions apply. Players may hold more than one non-FIFA nationality.

No.	Pos.	Nation	Player
1	GK	(Hungary) HUN	David Grof
8	MF	(Belgium) BEL	Florent Cuvelier (on loan from Stoke City)
23	GK	(England) ENG	Jimmy Walker

No.	Pos.	Nation	Player
27	GK	(Wales) WAL	Karl Darlow (on loan from Nottingham Forest)
28	GK	(Republic of Ireland) IRL	Ian McLoughlin (on loan from MK Dons)
32	GK	(Republic of Ireland) IRL	Aaron McCarey (on loan from Wolverhampton Wanderers)

== Squad statistics ==
Numbers in parentheses denote appearances as substitute.
Players with squad numbers struck through and marked † left the club during the playing season.
Players with names in italics and marked * were on loan from another club for the whole of their season with Walsall.
Players listed with no appearances have been in the matchday squad but only as unused substitutes.
Key to positions: GK – Goalkeeper; DF – Defender; MF – Midfielder; FW – Forward

No.	Pos.	Nat.	Name	Apps	Goals	Apps	Goals	Apps	Goals	Apps	Goals	Apps	Goals	Yellow card	Red card
No.	Pos.	Nat.	Name	League		FA Cup		League Cup		FL Trophy		Total		Discipline	
~~1~~ †	GK	HUN	Dávid Gróf	10	0	2	0	2	0	0	0	14	0	0	0
2	DF	ENG	Richard Taundry	10 (7)	0	1 (1)	1	1	0	1	0	13 (8)	1	3	0
4	DF	ENG	Andy Butler	41	3	2	0	2	0	1	0	46	3	10	1
5	DF	ENG	Dean Holden	24 (1)	2	2	0	2	0	0	0	28 (1)	2	3	1
6	MF	ENG	Nicky Featherstone	24 (7)	0	2	0	2	0	1	0	29 (7)	0	3	0
7	MF	ENG	Adam Chambers	34 (3)	0	2	0	2	0	0	0	38 (3)	0	4	0
~~8~~ †	MF	BEL	Florent Cuvelier *	16 (3)	2	0	0	2	0	1	1	19 (3)	3	2	0
9	FW	NIR	Will Grigg	38 (3)	19	1	0	2	0	1	1	42 (3)	20	2	0
10	MF	ENG	Jamie Paterson	46	12	2	1	2	0	1	0	51	13	0	0
11	FW	ENG	Ashley Hemmings	10 (19)	1	1 (1)	0	2	1	1	0	14 (20)	2	1	0
12	FW	ENG	Febian Brandy	27 (7)	7	1	0	0 (1)	0	0 (1)	0	28 (9)	7	10	1
13	GK	ENG	Richard Jones	0	0	0	0	0	0	0	0	0	0	0	0
14	DF	ENG	Ben Purkiss	25 (2)	0	1	0	2	0	0	0	28 (2)	0	3	0
15	FW	ENG	Connor Taylor	0	0	0	0	1	0	0	0	1	0	0	0
16	MF	ENG	Jake Jones	1 (2)	0	0 (2)	0	0 (2)	0	0 (1)	0	1 (7)	0	0	0
17	FW	ENG	George Bowerman	10 (18)	6	2	1	0 (2)	0	0 (1)	0	12 (21)	7	1	0
18	DF	ENG	Ben George	1	0	0	0	0	0	0	0	1	0	0	0
19	FW	ENG	Aaron Williams	0 (6)	0	0 (2)	0	0	0	0	0	0 (8)	0	0	0
20	DF	ENG	Mal Benning	6 (4)	0	1	0	0	0	0	0	7 (4)	0	1	0
21	MF	ENG	Kieron Morris	0	0	0	0	0	0	0	0	0	0	0	0
22	DF	ENG	Paul Downing	27 (4)	1	0	0	0	0	1	0	28 (4)	1	0	0
~~23~~ †	GK	ENG	Jimmy Walker	0	0	0	0	0	0	0	0	0	0	0	0
24	MF	ENG	James Baxendale	23 (9)	4	0	0	0 (1)	0	1	0	24 (10)	4	2	0
25	DF	ENG	James Chambers	16 (6)	0	2	0	0	0	0	0	18 (6)	0	0	0
26	DF	ENG	Andy Taylor	34	0	0	0	0	0	1	0	35	0	5	0
~~27~~ †	GK	WAL	Karl Darlow *	9	0	0	0	0	0	1	0	10	0	0	0
27	MF	ENG	Sam Mantom	29	2	0	0	0	0	0	0	29	2	1	0
~~28~~ †	GK	IRL	Ian McLoughlin *	6	0	0	0	0	0	0	0	6	0	0	0
28	GK	ENG	Sam Johnstone *	7	0	0	0	0	0	0	0	7	0	0	0
29	FW	ENG	Craig Westcarr	18 (6)	5	0	0	0	0	0	0	18 (6)	5	3	0
31	GK	ENG	Liam Roberts	0	0	0	0	0	0	0	0	0	0	0	0
~~32~~ †	GK	IRL	Aaron McCarey *	14	0	0	0	0	0	0	0	14	0	2	0
33	MF	SKN	Romaine Sawyers *	0 (4)	0	0	0	0	0	0	0	0 (4)	0	0	0
