= Jamie Paterson =

Jamie Paterson may refer to:

- Jamie Paterson (footballer, born 1973), Scottish footballer
- Jamie Paterson (footballer, born 1991), English footballer

== See also ==
- Jamie Patterson (disambiguation)
- James Paterson (disambiguation)
