= Big Jim Patterson =

Big Jim Patterson may refer to:

- Big Jim Paterson, trombonist of Dexys Midnight Runners
- Big Jim Patterson (cricketer) (born 1959), Irish cricketer
- Big Jim Patterson (Scottish footballer) (1928-2012)

== See also ==
- Jim Patterson (disambiguation)
