= Connor Taylor =

Connor Taylor is the name of:

- Connor Taylor (footballer, born 1992), English footballer
- Connor Taylor (footballer, born 2001), English footballer for Wycombe Wanderers
