= 2011–12 Walsall F.C. season =

Walsall F.C.
2011–12 season
- Chairman: Jeff Bonser
- Manager: Dean Smith
- Stadium: Bescot Stadium
- League One: 19th
- FA Cup: Second round
- League Cup: First round
- Football League Trophy: Second round
- Top goalscorer: League: Alex Nicholls (7); Jon Macken (7); All: Alex Nicholls (8); Jon Macken (8)
- Highest home attendance: 8,603 vs. Sheffield Wednesday, 26 December 2012
- Lowest home attendance: 1,802 vs. Dagenham & Redbridge, 13 December 2011
- Average home league attendance: 4,303
Home colours	Away colours	Third colours

The 2011–12 season was the 124th season of competitive association football played by Walsall. It was the club's fifth consecutive season in League One since achieving promotion during the 2006–07 season. The club also competed in the FA Cup, League Cup and Football League Trophy.

== League table ==
Pos	Team	Pld	W	D	L	GF	GA	GD	Pts	Promotion, qualification or relegation
17	Yeovil Town	46	14	12	20	59	80	−21	54	
18	Scunthorpe United	46	10	22	14	55	59	−4	52	
19	Walsall	46	10	20	16	51	57	−6	50	
20	Leyton Orient	46	13	11	22	48	75	−27	50	
21	Wycombe Wanderers (R)	46	11	10	25	65	88	−23	43	Relegation to Football League Two

Updated to match(es) played on 5 May 2012. Source: BBC Sport
Rules for classification: 1) Points; 2) Goal difference; 3) Number of goals scored
(R) Relegated

== Squad statistics ==
Numbers in parentheses denote appearances as substitute.
Players with squad numbers struck through and marked † left the club during the playing season.
Players with names in italics and marked * were on loan from another club for the whole of their season with Walsall.
Players listed with no appearances have been in the matchday squad but only as unused substitutes.
Key to positions: GK – Goalkeeper; DF – Defender; MF – Midfielder; FW – Forward

No.	Pos.	Nat.	Name	Apps	Goals	Apps	Goals	Apps	Goals	Apps	Goals	Apps	Goals	Yellow card	Red card
No.	Pos.	Nat.	Name	League		FA Cup		League Cup		FL Trophy		Total		Discipline	
1	GK	ENG	Jimmy Walker	24	0	3	0	1	0	1	0	29	0	3	1
2	DF	ENG	Darryl Westlake	14 (3)	0	1	0	1	0	2	0	18 (3)	0	0	0
3	DF	ENG	Mat Sadler	46	1	3	0	1	0	2	0	52	1	2	1
4	DF	ENG	Andy Butler	42	5	2 (1)	0	1	0	2	0	47 (1)	5	8	2
5	DF	ENG	Olly Lancashire	17 (3)	1	3	0	1	0	0	0	21 (3)	1	0	0
6	DF	ENG	Manny Smith	31 (2)	1	3	0	0	0	2	0	36 (2)	1	8	1
7	MF	ENG	Adam Chambers	26 (3)	2	4	0	1	0	2	0	33 (3)	2	3	1
8	FW	ENG	Ryan Jarvis	9 (10)	2	0 (3)	0	1	0	1 (1)	1	11 (14)	3	0	1
9	FW	NIR	Will Grigg	17 (12)	4	2 (1)	0	0	0	1	0	20 (13)	4	0	0
10	FW	IRL	Jon Macken	33 (4)	7	4	1	1	0	0	0	38 (4)	8	4	0
11	MF	ENG	Kevan Hurst	30 (4)	2	0	0	1	0	1 (1)	1	32 (5)	3	6	0
12	DF	WAL	Lee Beevers	28 (7)	0	4	0	0	0	0 (1)	0	32 (8)	0	5	1
14	DF	ENG	Richard Taundry	31 (4)	0	3 (1)	0	1	0	1 (1)	1	36 (6)	1	3	0
15	MF	ENG	Jamie Paterson	24 (10)	3	2	0	0	0	0	0	26 (10)	3	1	0
16	FW	ENG	Alex Nicholls	32 (13)	7	4	1	0 (1)	0	2	0	38 (14)	8	2	0
17	FW	ENG	George Bowerman	3 (19)	3	0 (3)	1	0 (1)	0	0	0	3 (23)	4	1	0
~~18~~ †	MF	FRA	Claude Gnakpa	8 (12)	1	1 (2)	1	1	0	2	0	12 (14)	2	3	0
19	MF	USA	Anton Peterlin	20 (6)	0	1 (1)	0	0 (1)	0	1 (1)	0	22 (9)	0	2	0
20	MF	ENG	Jake Jones	0	0	0	0	0	0	0	0	0	0	0	0
21	GK	HUN	Dávid Gróf	22 (1)	0	1	0	0	0	1	0	24 (1)	0	0	0
~~24~~ †	MF	ENG	Dave Martin *	4	0	0	0	0	0	1	0	5	0	1	1
~~24~~ †	MF	ENG	Mark Wilson *	4	0	2	1	0	0	0	0	6	1	1	0
24	DF	ENG	Mal Benning	0	0	0	0	0	0	0	0	0	0	0	0
~~25~~ †	MF	SCO	Andy Halliday *	2 (5)	0	1	0	0	0	0	0	3 (5)	0	0	0
25	MF	BEL	Florent Cuvelier *	17 (1)	4	0	0	0	0	0	0	17 (1)	4	2	0
27	MF	ENG	Sam Mantom *	13	3	0	0	0	0	0	0	13	3	0	0
28	MF	ARG	Emmanuel Ledesma	9 (1)	4	0	0	0	0	0	0	9 (1)	4	2	0
31	GK	ENG	Liam Maher	0	0	0	0	0	0	0	0	0	0	0	0

Players not included in matchday squads
No.	Pos.	Nat.	Name
22	FW	ENG	Joey Butlin
23	FW	ENG	Connor Deards
26	DF	ENG	Jamie Tank

== Results ==
=== Pre-season friendlies ===
13 July 2011	Greenock Morton	0–2	Walsall	Cappielow Park
19:30			Chambers; Gnakpa

15 July 2011	Gretna 2008	0–0	Walsall	Raydale Park
19:30

19 July 2011	Walsall	2–3	Wolverhampton Wanderers	Bank's Stadium
19:45	Macken 20'; Grigg 42'		Kightly 14'; Griffiths 40'; Berra 66'	Attendance: 5,065

21 July 2011	Walsall	1–3	Aston Villa	Bank's Stadium
19:45	Bowerman 80'		Bent 8', 36'; Heskey 39'	Attendance: 7,170

26 July 2011	Cheltenham Town	3–2	Walsall	Abbey Business Stadium
19:45	Spencer 10'; Mohamed 45+1'; Low 69'		Nicholls 20'; Paterson 87'	Attendance: 839

30 July 2011	Port Vale	1–1	Walsall	Vale Park
13:00	Rigg 8'		McCombe 60' (og.)	Attendance: 1,101

=== League One ===
6 August 2011 1	Walsall	1–0	Leyton Orient	Banks's Stadium
15:00	Chambers 21'			Attendance: 4,753

13 August 2011 2	Hartlepool United	1–1	Walsall	Victoria Park
15:00	Nish 5'		Macken 3' (pen.)	Attendance: 5,170

16 August 2011 3	Sheffield United	3–2	Walsall	Bramall Lane
19:45	Lowton 59'; Williamson 68'; Cresswell 74' (pen.)		Hurst 46'; Grigg 51'	Attendance: 16,443

20 August 2011 4	Walsall	1–1	Yeovil Town	Banks's Stadium
15:00	Macken 19'		G. Williams 42'	Attendance: 4,247

27 August 2011 5	Bournemouth	0–2	Walsall	Seward Stadium
15:00			Jarvis 15' (pen.), 55'	Attendance: 5,092

3 September 2011 6	Walsall	0–1	Brentford	Banks's Stadium
15:00			Donaldson 27'	Attendance: 3,972

10 September 2011 7	Notts County	2–1	Walsall	Meadow Lane
15:00	L. Hughes 38'; Montano 65'		Butler 61'	Attendance: 6,218

13 September 2011 8	Walsall	0–1	Oldham Athletic	Banks's Stadium
19:45			Taylor 29'	Attendance: 3,250

17 September 2011 9	Walsall	2–2	Scunthorpe United	Banks's Stadium
15:00	Chambers 22'; Grigg 83'		Thompson 78'; Ryan 90+4'	Attendance: 3,619

24 September 2011 10	Colchester United	1–0	Walsall	Colchester Community Stadium
15:00	Wordsworth 33' (pen.)			Attendance: 3,103

1 October 2011 11	Walsall	1–1	Carlisle United	Banks's Stadium
15:00	Grigg 33'		Robson 50'	Attendance: 3,831

8 October 2011 12	Wycombe Wanderers	1–1	Walsall	Adams Park
15:00	Strevens 49'		Nicholls 81'	Attendance: 7,097

15 October 2011 13	Walsall	1–0	Preston North End	Banks's Stadium
15:00	Nicholls 10'			Attendance: 4,834

22 October 2011 14	Tranmere Rovers	2–1	Walsall	Prenton Park
15:00	Weir 59'; Tiryaki 80'		Butler 73'	Attendance: 4,469

25 October 2011 15	Walsall	1–2	Exeter City	Banks's Stadium
19:45	Nicholls 12'		Nardiello 8', 78'	Attendance: 4,003

29 October 2011 16	Walsall	0–2	MK Dons	Banks's Stadium
15:00			Lewington 35'; Ibehre 45'	Attendance: 3,712

5 November 2011 17	Huddersfield Town	1–1	Walsall	Galpharm Stadium
15:00	Novak 67'		Paterson 78'	Attendance: 13,005

19 November 2011 18	Walsall	2–4	Bury	Banks's Stadium
15:00	Macken 28' (pen.); Bowerman 90+3'		Sweeney 6'; Jones 46'; Schumacher 63'; John-Lewis 87'	Attendance: 4,785

26 November 2011 19	Stevenage	0–0	Walsall	Broadhall Way
15:00				Attendance: 3,140

10 December 2011 20	Walsall	1–1	Charlton Athletic	Banks's Stadium
15:00	Macken 36'		Kermorgant 45'	Attendance: 4,537

17 December 2011 21	Chesterfield	1–1	Walsall	B2net Stadium
15:00	Lester 90'		Nicholls 29'	Attendance: 6,236

26 December 2011 22	Walsall	2–1	Sheffield Wednesday	Banks's Stadium
15:00	Gnakpa 90+1'; Smith 90+4'		Lowe 60'	Attendance: 8,603

31 December 2011 23	Walsall	0–0	Rochdale	Banks's Stadium
13:00				Attendance: 3,907

2 January 2012 24	Bury	2–1	Walsall	Gigg Lane
15:00	Sadler o.g 20'; Sweeney 40'		Paterson 39'	Attendance: 3,095

7 January 2012 25	Walsall	2–2	Bournemouth	Banks's Stadium
15:00	Macken 15'; Butler 44'		Symes pen 62'; Fletcher 90+3'	Attendance: 3,658

14 January 2012 26	Brentford	0–0	Walsall	Griffin Park
15:00				Attendance: 4,867

21 January 2012 27	Carlisle United	1–1	Walsall	Brunton Park
15:00	Miller 7'		Nicholls 82' pen	Attendance: 5,051

31 January 2012 28	Walsall	0–1	Notts County	Banks's Stadium
19:45			Hughes 3'	Attendance: 3,647

14 February 2012 29	Oldham Athletic	1–2	Walsall	Boundary Park
19:45	Morais 2'; Simpson 31'		Cuvelier 74'	Attendance: 2,583

18 February 2012 30	Walsall	2–0	Wycombe Wanderers	Banks's Stadium
15:00	Hurst 62'; Bowerman 85'			Attendance: 3,491

21 February 2012 31	Scunthorpe United	0–1	Walsall	Glanford Park
19:45			Cuvelier 34'	Attendance: 3,455

25 February 2012 32	Preston North End	0–0	Walsall	Deepdale
15:00				Attendance: 11,091

3 March 2012 33	Leyton Orient	1–1	Walsall	Matchroom Stadium
15:00	Cox 34'		Lancashire 90+4'	Attendance: 4,183

6 March 2012 34	Walsall	3–2	Sheffield United	Banks's Stadium
19:45	Mantom 55'; Macken 73'; Nicholls 81'		Williamson 65'; Evans 76'	Attendance: 5,003

10 March 2012 35	Walsall	0–0	Hartlepool United	Banks's Stadium
15:00				Attendance: 3,751

17 March 2012 36	Yeovil Town	2–1	Walsall	Huish Park
15:00	Williams 63', 84'		Mantom 44'	Attendance: 3,705

20 March 2012 37	Sheffield Wednesday	2–2	Walsall	Hillsborough
19:45	Lowe 60'; Madine 90+5'		Macken 58'; Paterson 73'	Attendance: 18,869

24 March 2012 38	Walsall	1–1	Stevenage	Banks's Stadium
15:00	Butler 3'		Bostwick 60'	Attendance: 4,786

27 March 2012 39	Walsall	3–1	Colchester United	Banks's Stadium
19:45	Ledesma 38'; Sadler 44'; Bowerman 73'		Wordsworth 11'	Attendance: 3,331

31 March 2012 40	Rochdale	3–3	Walsall	Spotland Stadium
15:00	Kennedy 66'; Symes 82' (pen.); Akpa Akpro 90+3'		Ledesma 25'; Widdowson 38' (o.g.); Butler 90+4'	Attendance: 2,516

7 April 2012 41	Walsall	3–2	Chesterfield	Banks's Stadium
15:00	Ledesma 27', 33'; Mantom 58'		Moussa 20'; Randall 54'; Juan (yellow card) 87'; Ridehalgh (yellow card) 90+2'	Attendance: 4,051

9 April 2012 42	Charlton Athletic	1–0	Walsall	The Valley (London)
15:00	Pritchard (yellow card) 17'; N'Guessan 35'; Solly (yellow card) 59'		Ledesma (yellow card) 66'	Attendance: 15,253

14 April 2012 43	Walsall	0–1	Tranmere Rovers	Banks's Stadium
15:00	Beevers (yellow card) 30' (yellow-red card) 90+4'; Butler (yellow card) 61'		Welsh (yellow card) 48'; Robinson 62'; Buchanan (yellow card) 69'; McGurk 90+3'	Attendance: 3,895

21 April 2012 44	Exeter City	4–2	Walsall	St James Park, Exeter
15:00	Nardiello 50'; Gow 69', 77'; Sercombe 88'		Smith (yellow card) 12' (yellow-red card) 66'; Nicholls 30'; Cuvelier 55' (yellow card) 71'; Ledesma (yellow card) 90+6'	Attendance: 4,307

28 April 2012 45	Walsall	1–1	Huddersfield Town	Banks's Stadium
15:00	Cuvelier 49'		Novak 2'	Attendance: 4,646

5 May 2012 46	Milton Keynes Dons	0–1	Walsall	Stadium mk
15:00	Gleeson (yellow card) 80'		Grigg 18'	Attendance: 10,607

=== FA Cup ===
12 November 2011 First round	Exeter City	1–1	Walsall	Exeter
15:00	Noble 90+4'	Summary	Wilson 21'; Butler (yellow card) 27'; Beevers (yellow card) 29'	Stadium: St James Park, Exeter; Attendance: 3,026; Referee: James Linington

23 November 2011 First round replay	Walsall	3–2 (a.e.t.)	Exeter City	Walsall
19:45	Macken 64'; Nicholls 69'; Bowerman 98'	Summary	Logan 41'; Frear 77'; Nichols (yellow card) 108'	Stadium: Banks's Stadium; Attendance: 2,089; Referee: Dean Mohareb

3 December 2011 Second round	Dagenham & Redbridge	1–1	Walsall	Dagenham
15:00	Nurse 81'	Summary	Gnakpa 76'; Jarvis (red card) 90+4'	Stadium: Victoria Road (Dagenham); Attendance: 1,237; Referee: Darren Deadman

13 December 2011 Second round replay	Walsall	0–0 (2–3 p)	Dagenham & Redbridge	Walsall
19:45		Summary	Ogogo (yellow card) 55'; Woodall (yellow card) 112'	Stadium: Banks's Stadium; Attendance: 1,802; Referee: Eddie Llderton

=== League Cup ===
9 August 2011 First round	Walsall	0–3	Middlesbrough	Bank's Stadium
19:45			Emnes 17', 37', 52' (pen.)	Attendance: 3,564

=== Football League Trophy ===
30 August 2011 First round	Walsall	2–1	Shrewsbury Town	Bank's Stadium
19:45	Jarvis 17'; Taundry 35'		Butler 48' (o.g.)	Attendance: 2,605

4 October 2011 Second round	Rochdale	1–1 (3–1 p)	Walsall	Spotland
19:45	Ball 49'		Hurst 66'	Attendance: 2,089

== Transfers ==
Players transferred in
Date	Pos.	Name	From	Fee	Ref.
27 June 2011	DF	(England) Mat Sadler	(England) Watford	Free Transfer	
28 June 2011	MF	(England) Kevan Hurst	(England) Carlisle United	Free Transfer	
30 June 2011	FW	(England) Ryan Jarvis	(England) Leyton Orient	Free Transfer	
1 July 2011	MF	(France) Claude Gnakpa	(England) Luton Town	Free Transfer	
8 July 2011	MF	(England) Adam Chambers	(England) Leyton Orient	Free Transfer	
14 July 2011	DF	(Wales) Lee Beevers	(England) Colchester United	Free Transfer	
19 July 2011	GK	(Hungary) David Grof	(England) Notts County	Free Transfer	
27 July 2011	MF	(United States) Anton Peterlin	(England) Plymouth Argyle	Free Transfer	
Players transferred out
Date	Pos.	Name	To	Fee	Ref.
29 May 2011	DF	(Cyprus) Tom Williams	(England) Kettering Town	Free Transfer	
29 May 2011	MF	(England) Julian Gray	(Cyprus) Nea Salamis Famagusta	Free Transfer	
29 May 2011	GK	(England) Tim Cooney	Free Agent	Free Fransfer	
29 May 2011	DF	(England) Sean Geddes	(England) Stourbridge	Free Transfer	
29 May 2011	FW	(Jamaica) Darren Byfield	Free Agent	Free Transfer	
29 May 2011	MF	(Argentina) Emmanuel Ledesma	(Argentina) Defensa y Justicia	Free Transfer	
29 June 2011	GK	(England) Jonny Brain	(England) Nantwich Town	Free Transfer	
29 June 2011	GK	(Republic of Ireland) David Bevan	(England) Daventry Town	Free Transfer	
29 June 2011	DF	(England) Aaron Lescott	(England) Halesowen Town	Free Transfer	
29 June 2011	DF	(England) Alex Hickman	Free Agent	Free Transfer	
29 June 2011	FW	(Northern Ireland) Steve Jones	(England) AFC Telford	Free Transfer	
1 July 2011	DF	(England) Clayton McDonald	(England) Port Vale	Free Transfer	
28 July 2011	MF	(England) Matt Richards	(England) Shrewsbury Town	Free Transfer	
3 August 2011	MF	(England) Paul Marshall	(England) Rochdale	Free Transfer	
27 January 2012	MF	(France) Claude Gnakpa	(Scotland) Inverness	Free Transfer	
Players loaned in
Date from	Pos.	Name	From	Date to	Ref.
27 January 2012	MF	(Belgium) Florent Cuvelier	(England) Stoke City	End Of Season	
13 September 2011	MF	(England) Dave Martin	(England) Derby County	20 October 2011	
28 October 2011	MF	(England) Mark Wilson	(England) Doncaster Rovers	29 November 2011	
25 November 2011	MF	(Scotland) Andy Halliday	(England) Middlesbrough	9 January 2012	
Players loaned out
Date from	Pos.	Name	To	Date to	Ref.
