= 2010–11 Walsall F.C. season =

Walsall
2010–11 season
- Chairman: Jeff Bonser
- Manager: Chris Hutchings (until 4 January 2011); Dean Smith (from 21 January 2011)
- Stadium: Bescot Stadium
- League One: 20th
- FA Cup: Second round
- League Cup: First round
- FL Trophy: First round

The 2010–11 season was the 123rd season of competitive association football and the 4th consecutive season in League One played by Walsall Football Club, a professional association football club based in Walsall, West Midlands, England. The team reached the second round of the FA Cup, losing to Torquay United. There was a change of manager in January.

== Season summary ==
Having finished 10th in the previous season, Walsall started the season poorly, losing six of their first eight league games.

On 4 January 2011, manager Chris Hutchings was sacked with the club bottom of the league and having recorded just 5 league wins. On 21 January 2011, Dean Smith was appointed as manager after a successful spell as caretaker manager following the dismissal of Chris Hutchings. The saddlers finished the season in 20th place, 1 point above the relegation zone.

== First-team squad ==
Squad at end of season

Note: Flags indicate national team as defined under FIFA eligibility rules; some limited exceptions apply. Players may hold more than one non-FIFA nationality.

No.	Pos.	Nation	Player
1	GK	ENG	Jonny Brain
2	DF	ENG	Darryl Westlake
3	DF	ENG	Aaron Lescott
4	DF	ENG	Clayton McDonald
5	DF	ENG	Olly Lancashire
6	DF	ENG	Manny Smith
8	MF	ENG	Matt Richards
9	FW	JAM	Darren Byfield (Note: Byfield was born in Sutton Coldfield, England.)
10	FW	IRL	Jon Macken (Note: Macken was born in Manchester, England.)
11	FW	ENG	Alex Nicholls
12	MF	ENG	Paul Marshall
14	DF	ENG	Richard Taundry
15	FW	ENG	Jamie Paterson
16	DF	ENG	Alex Hickman

No.	Pos.	Nation	Player
17	FW	ENG	George Bowerman
18	MF	ENG	Julian Gray
19	FW	ENG	Will Grigg
20	MF	ENG	Sean Geddes
21	GK	IRL	David Bevan
23	MF	FRA	Marco Gbarssin (Note: Gbarssin was born in Bordeaux, France, but also qualifies to represent the Central African Republic internationally.) (on loan from Carlisle United)
24	MF	ENG	Aaron Forde
26	MF	SCO	Marc Laird (on loan from Millwall)
27	MF	ENG	Jordan Cook (on loan from Sunderland)
28	DF	CYP	Tom Williams (Note: Williams was born in Sutton, England.)
29	GK	ENG	Jimmy Walker
30	MF	ARG	Emmanuel Ledesma
32	DF	ENG	Andy Butler

=== Left club during season ===
Note: Flags indicate national team as defined under FIFA eligibility rules; some limited exceptions apply. Players may hold more than one non-FIFA nationality.

No.	Pos.	Nation	Player
7	FW	NIR	Steve Jones (on loan to Motherwell)
22	FW	ENG	Reuben Reid (on loan from West Bromwich Albion)
22	MF	ENG	Matthew Gill (on loan from Norwich City)
23	DF	NIR	Ryan McGivern (on loan from Manchester City)
23	FW	WAL	Jason Price (on loan from Carlisle United)

No.	Pos.	Nation	Player
26	MF	ENG	David Davis (on loan from Wolverhampton Wanderers)
27	DF	ENG	Andrew Davies (on loan from Stoke City)
28	MF	ENG	Martin Devaney (Note: Devaney was born in Cheltenham, England.) (on loan from Barnsley)
30	FW	ENG	Liam Dickinson (on loan from Barnsley)

== Competitions ==
=== League One ===
==== Table ====
Pos	Team	Pld	W	D	L	GF	GA	GD	Pts	Promotion, qualification or relegation
18	Tranmere Rovers	46	15	11	20	53	60	−7	56	
19	Notts County	46	14	8	24	46	60	−14	50	
20	Walsall	46	12	12	22	56	75	−19	48	
21	Dagenham & Redbridge (R)	46	12	11	23	52	70	−18	47	Relegation to Football League Two
22	Bristol Rovers (R)	46	11	12	23	48	82	−34	45	Relegation to Football League Two

Updated to match(es) played on 2 May 2011. Source: BBC
Rules for classification: 1) points; 2) goal difference; 3) number of goals scored.
(R) Relegated

==== Results ====
League One match details
Date	Opponents	Venue	Result	Score F–A	Scorers	Attendance	Ref.
7 August 2010	Milton Keynes Dons	H	L	1–2	Smith 48'	4,034	
14 August 2010	Brentford	A	W	2–1	Nicholls 12', Gray 54'	4,544	
21 August 2010	Plymouth Argyle	H	W	2–1	Marshall 53', Reid 69'	3,966	
28 August 2010	Brighton & Hove Albion	A	L	1–2	Macken 90'	8,737	
4 September 2010	Colchester United	H	L	0–1		3,416	
11 September 2010	Rochdale	A	L	2–3	Macken 4', Byfield 45+1'	3,174	
18 September 2010	Swindon Town	H	L	1–2	Reid 70'	4,580	
25 September 2010	Hartlepool United	A	L	1–2	Gray 9'	2,552	
28 September 2010	Leyton Orient	A	D	0–0		2,963	
2 October 2010	Yeovil Town	H	L	0–1		3,172	
9 October 2010	Exeter City	H	W	2–1	Reid 32', Richards 43'	3,776	
16 October 2010	Dagenham & Redbridge	A	D	1–1	Devaney 50'	2,666	
23 October 2010	Tranmere Rovers	H	L	1–4	Macken 65'	3,362	
30 October 2010	Huddersfield Town	A	L	0–1		13,062	
2 November 2010	Peterborough United	H	L	1–3	Gray 53'	3,294	
13 November 2010	Bournemouth	A	L	0–3		5,601	
20 November 2010	Carlisle United	H	W	2–1	Richards 37', 53'	4,256	
23 November 2010	Sheffield Wednesday	A	L	0–3		15,228	
12 December 2010	Charlton Athletic	A	W	1–0	Richards 69'	14,938	
1 January 2011	Notts County	H	L	0–3		4,131	
3 January 2011	Peterborough United	A	L	1–4	Nicholls 10'	5,517	
8 January 2011	Tranmere Rovers	A	D	3–3	Richards 32', Macken 85', Butler 90+4'	4,602	
11 January 2011	Bristol Rovers	A	D	2–2	Grigg 5', Lescott 83'	5,369	
15 January 2011	Huddersfield Town	H	L	2–4	Nicholls 14', Richards 47'	3,827	
22 January 2011	Exeter City	A	L	1–2	Gray 85'	4,853	
25 January 2011	Oldham Athletic	H	D	1–1	Westlake 61'	3,247	
29 January 2011	Bristol Rovers	H	W	6–1	Butler 17', 73' Gill 34', Gray 45', Richards 50', Nicholls 69'	4,023	
2 February 2011	Notts County	A	D	1–1	Nicholls 88'	4,714	
5 February 2011	Carlisle United	A	W	3–1	Gill 37', Gray 59', 73'	4,332	
12 February 2011	Bournemouth	H	L	0–1	–	4,103	
15 February 2011	Dagenham & Redbridge	H	W	1–0	Grigg 81'	3,174	
19 February 2011	Colchester United	A	L	0–2		3,439	
26 February 2011	Rochdale	H	D	0–0		3,830	
1 March 2011 (Note: Match was originally scheduled for 18 December 2010, but postponed and rearranged due to a waterlogged pitch.)	Southampton	H	W	1–0	Macken 69'	4,684	
5 March 2011	Swindon Town	A	D	0–0		10,489	
8 March 2011	Leyton Orient	H	L	0–2		3,019	
12 March 2011	Yeovil Town	A	D	1–1	Macken 18'	3,737	
19 March 2011	Hartlepool United	H	W	5–2	Grigg 59', Byfield 64', Gray 77', Smith 83', Ledesma 90+4'	4,234	
25 March 2011	Milton Keynes Dons	A	D	1–1	Richards 29'	8,923	
9 April 2011	Plymouth Argyle	A	L	0–2		7,995	
12 April 2011	Brentford	H	W	3–2	Macken 40', 64', Cook 57'	3,154	
16 April 2011	Brighton & Hove Albion	H	L	1–3	Butler 11'	6,015	
23 April 2011	Sheffield Wednesday	H	D	1–1	Macken 10'	2,072	
25 April 2011	Oldham Athletic	A	D	1–1	Williams 58'	3,463	
30 April 2011	Charlton Athletic	H	W	2–0	Grigg 34', Gray 78'	5,088	
7 May 2011	Southampton	A	L	1–3	Gray 45+3'	31,653	

=== FA Cup ===
FA Cup match details
Round	Date	Opponents	Venue	Result	Score F–A	Scorers	Attendance	Ref.
First round	6 November 2010	Fleetwood Town	A	D	1–1	Richards 4'	2,319	
First round replay	16 November 2010	Fleetwood Town	H	W	2–0	Reid 58', 90+3'	2,056	
Second round	27 November 2010	Torquay United	A	L	0–1		2,334	

=== League Cup ===
League Cup match details
Round	Date	Opponents	Venue	Result	Score F–A	Scorers	Attendance	Ref.
First round	10 August 2010	Tranmere Rovers	H	L	0–1		2,253	

=== Football League Trophy ===
Football League Trophy match details
Round	Date	Opponents	Venue	Result	Score F–A	Scorers	Attendance	Ref.
First round	31 August 2010	Chesterfield	H	L	1–2	Reid 19'	1,793	
