= Emmanuel Ledesma =

Argentine footballer

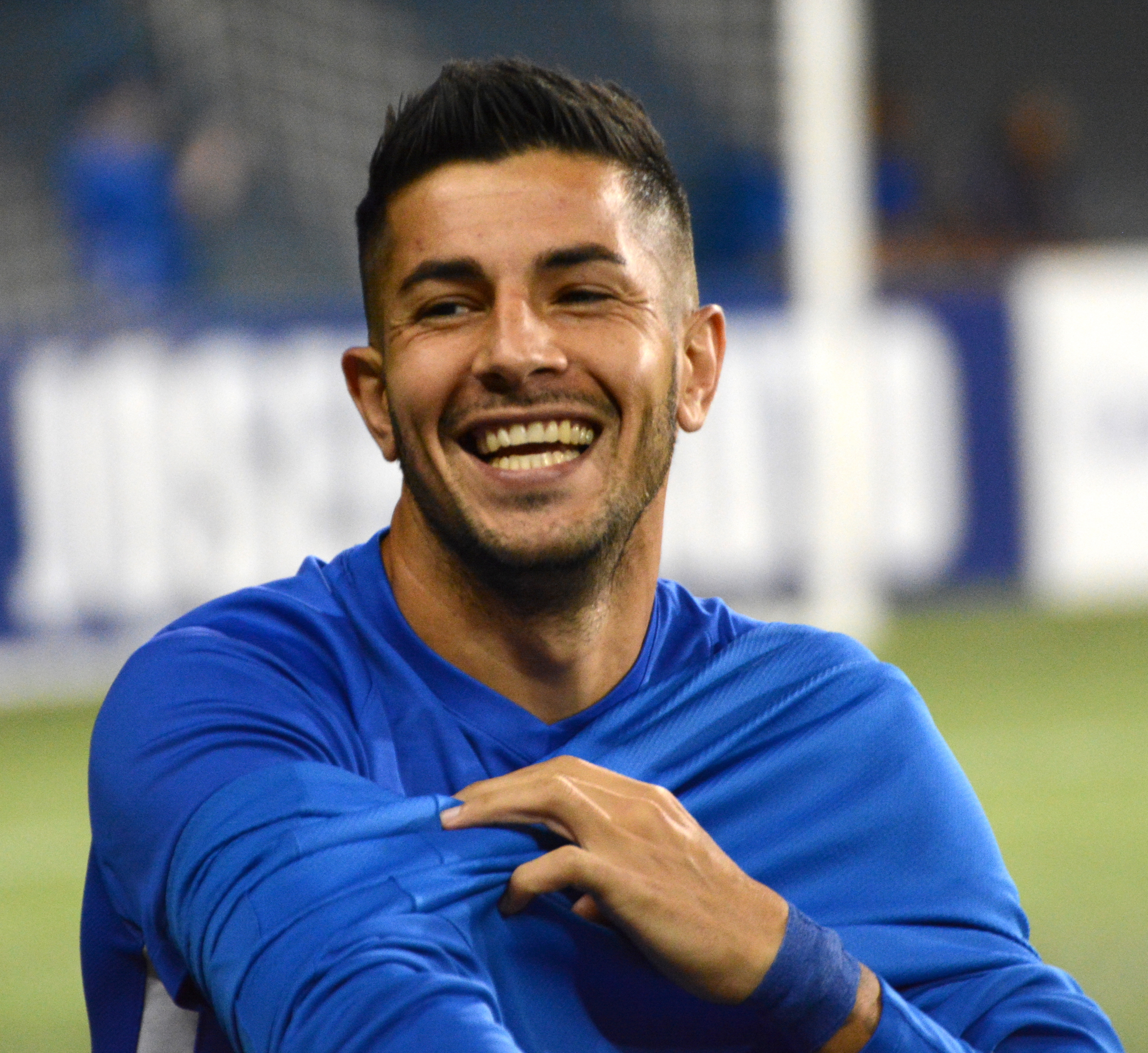
- Ledesma with FC Cincinnati in 2018

Personal information
- Full name: Emmanuel Jorge Ledesma
- Date of birth: 24 May 1988 (age 38)
- Place of birth: Quilmes, Argentina
- Height: 1.80 m (5 ft 11 in)
- Position: Attacking midfielder

Youth career
- 2005–2006: Defensa y Justicia
- 2006–2008: Genoa

Senior career*
Years	Team	Apps	(Gls)
2008–2010	Genoa	0	(0)
2008–2009	→ Queens Park Rangers (loan)	17	(4)
2009	→ Salernitana (loan)	8	(1)
2009–2010	→ Novara (loan)	8	(1)
2010	Crotone	10	(0)
2011	Walsall	10	(1)
2011	Defensa y Justicia	3	(0)
2012	Walsall	10	(4)
2012–2015	Middlesbrough	56	(8)
2014–2015	→ Rotherham United (loan)	7	(1)
2015	→ Brighton & Hove Albion (loan)	4	(0)
2015–2016	Rotherham United	5	(0)
2016	Brentford	1	(0)
2016	Panetolikos	9	(0)
2017	New York Cosmos	21	(10)
2018–2019	FC Cincinnati	59	(22)
2020–2021	SJK	18	(6)
2021	Indy Eleven	2	(0)
2022	Barnechea	5	(0)
2023	Las Vegas Lights	16	(1)
- * Club domestic league appearances and goals as of 20 March 2024

Emmanuel Jorge Ledesma (born 24 May 1988) is a former Argentine footballer who played as an attacking midfielder.

== Career ==
=== Early years as a journeyman ===
After moving through the youth ranks of Serie A side Genoa, Ledesma joined Queens Park Rangers on a season-long loan in June 2008. Ledesma made a bright start to his career in English football, highlighted by a hat-trick at home to Carlisle in the second round of the League Cup, this coming days after his first and what turned out to be only league goal for QPR in a 2–0 win over Doncaster Rovers. After only a few games at Loftus Road, he had made a good impression on many Queens Park Rangers fans and a limited edition T-shirt was made in his honour. On 2 February 2009 he left QPR by mutual consent to join Serie B side Salernitana in a half-season loan move.

In July 2009 he went to Novara Calcio, on loan from Genoa, with option to sign him in a co-ownership deal. Although he won promotion to Serie B with Novara, in June 2010, the club decided to send him back to Genoa. Ledesma subsequently signed for newly promoted Serie B club, F.C. Crotone, in a co-ownership deal, however, after only half of the season, he returned to Genoa and was released in January 2011.

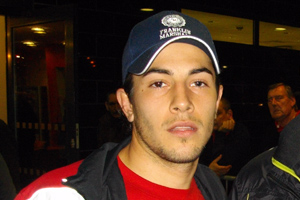
Ledesma after a 2011 match

Following his release by Genoa, Ledesma was offered a trial with Brighton and Hove Albion where, despite scoring on his debut for the reserves, he was not offered a permanent deal. While playing for Brighton reserves, Ledesma was spotted by Walsall, where he successfully completed a trial, and contracted himself to Walsall until the end of the 2010–11 season. Ledesma scored one goal in aiding Walsall's successful survival against relegation, before returning to Argentina to re-join boyhood club Defensa y Justicia. Ledesma returned to England in 2012 and, in March, again signed a contract with Walsall for the remainder of the 2011–12 season.

=== Signing with Middlesbrough ===
Ledesma signed a three-year contract with Middlesbrough in July 2012. On 11 August 2012, Ledesma scored on his first competitive game for Middlesbrough, scoring in a 2–1 victory over Bury in the first round of the League Cup. After struggling to establish himself in the first team squad, he added a second goal scored directly from a corner in a 3–1 victory over Preston North End in the third round. Ledesma scored his first league goal for Middlesbrough in a 4–1 win against Charlton Athletic. Ledesma was named in the Championship team of the week after the Charlton match and followed up this strong performance with a man of the match effort against Sheffield Wednesday a week later. He also scored a free kick in a 3–0 home win over Huddersfield Town. After struggling to get amongst the first team again in the 2013/2014 season, Ledesma earned a place in the lineup in December under new manager Aitor Karanka and scored two goals in two games. He scored another long range effort a month later against Charlton Athletic.

On 22 November 2014, it was announced that Ledesma had been recruited on an emergency loan deal to Rotherham United until January 2015. He made his debut as a half-time substitute the same day in a 1–0 loss to Birmingham City.

=== International journeyman ===
Following his release by Middlesbrough, on 2 July 2015 Ledesma signed a one-year deal with Championship side Rotherham United.

On 9 August 2016, Ledesma joined Championship club Brentford on non-contract terms, but after just two appearances, he departed for Super League Greece club Panetolikos. On 24 December 2016, Panetolikos and Ledesma parted ways.

On 23 March 2017, Ledesma joined North American Soccer League side New York Cosmos.

=== FC Cincinnati ===
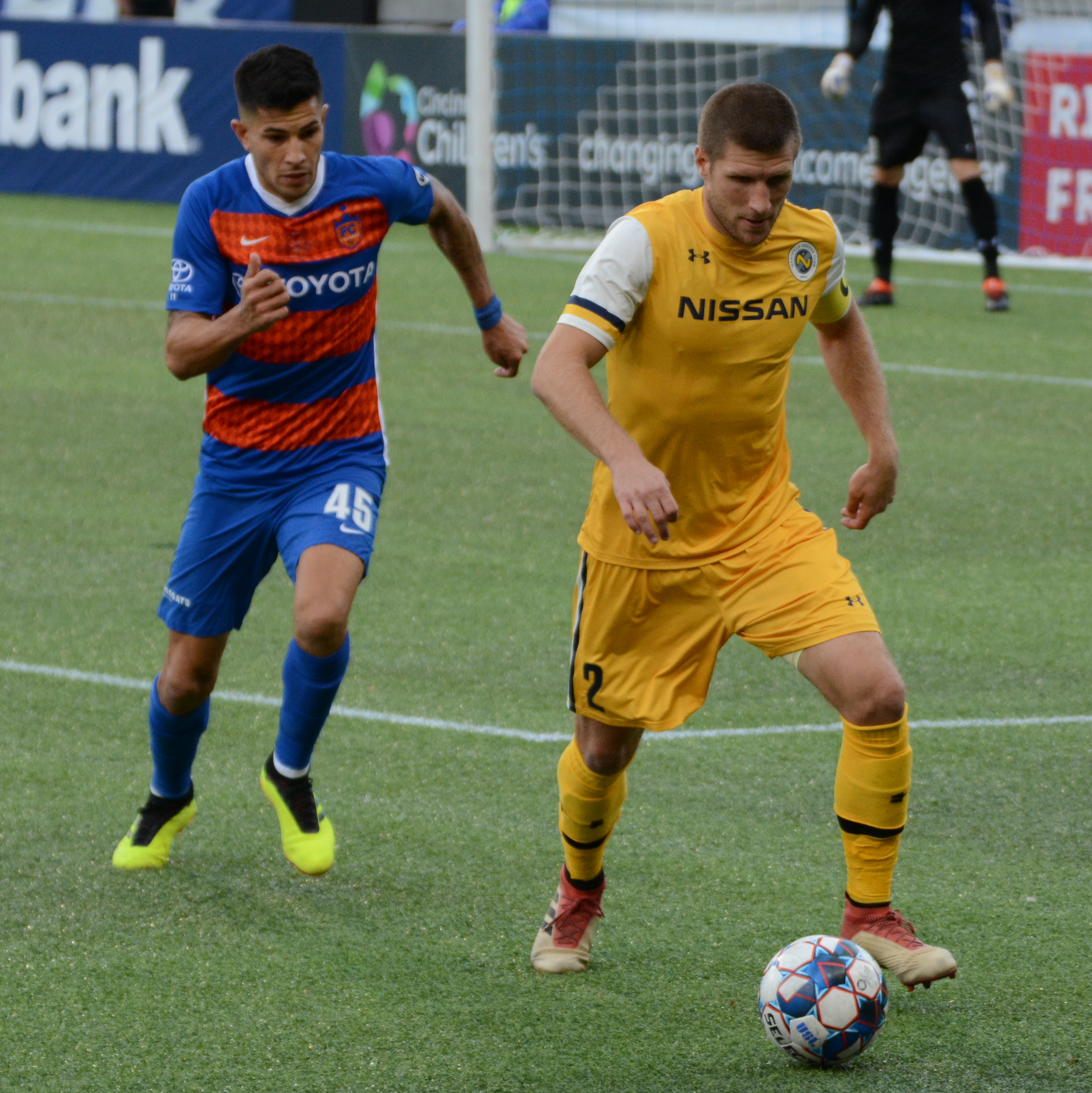
Ledesma with FC Cincinnati in 2018, pursuing Justin Davis of Nashville SC

Ledesma signed with United Soccer League side FC Cincinnati on 4 January 2018. He was a key player for Cincinnati in the 2018 season, earning 16 goals and a new league record of 16 assists. He was named USL Player of the Month twice (June and September) and appeared on the USL Team of the Week ten times. Following the end of the season, he was named the USL Most Valuable Player of 2018, chosen by a vote of media members and team management.

In May 2018, Major League Soccer announced that FC Cincinnati would be joining the league in 2019, meaning a new roster would be formed. A journalist for ESPN first reported that Ledesma had signed to the new MLS roster in October 2018, but this was not confirmed until the league officially announced his signing on 26 November 2018. Ledesma was the fourth of ten players from the 2018 roster to be named to the MLS roster.

=== SJK ===
Ledesma signed with Veikkausliiga side SJK on 19 August 2020. The contract was terminated on 24 June 2021.

=== Indy Eleven ===
In September 2021, Ledesma returned to the USL Championship by signing with Indy Eleven. Following the 2021 season, it was announced that Ledesma's contract option was declined by Indy Eleven.

=== Barnechea ===
In July 2022, he moved to Chile and joined Barnechea in the Primera B.

== Career statistics ==
As of match played 18 June 2021

Appearances and goals by club, season and competition
Club	Season	League			National Cup		League Cup		Total	
Club	Season	Division	Apps	Goals	Apps	Goals	Apps	Goals	Apps	Goals
Genoa	2008–09	Serie A	0	0	0	0	—		0	0
Genoa	2009–10	Serie A	0	0	0	0	—		0	0
Genoa	Total		0	0	0	0	—		0	0
Queens Park Rangers (loan)	2008–09	Championship	17	1	2	0	4	3	23	4
Salernitana (loan)	2008–09	Serie B	8	1	0	0	—		8	1
Novara Calcio (loan)	2009–10	Serie C	8	1	3	1	—		11	2
Crotone	2010–11	Serie B	10	0	2	1	—		12	1
Walsall	2010–11	League One	10	1	0	0	0	0	10	1
Defensa y Justicia	2011–12	Primera B Nacional	3	0	0	0	—		3	0
Walsall	2011–12	League One	10	4	0	0	0	0	10	4
Middlesbrough	2012–13	Championship	28	2	1	0	4	1	33	3
Middlesbrough	2013–14	Championship	27	6	1	0	1	0	29	6
Middlesbrough	2014–15	Championship	1	0	0	0	1	0	2	0
Middlesbrough	Total		56	8	2	0	6	1	64	9
Rotherham United (loan)	2014–15	Championship	7	1	0	0	0	0	7	1
Brighton & Hove Albion (loan)	2014–15	Championship	4	0	0	0	0	0	4	0
Rotherham United	2015–16	Championship	5	0	3	0	0	0	8	0
Brentford	2016–17	Championship	1	0	0	0	0	0	1	0
Panetolikos	2016–17	Super League Greece	9	0	2	0	—		11	0
New York Cosmos	2017	NASL	21	10	0	0	—		21	10
FC Cincinnati	2018	USL Championship	33	16	0	0	—		33	16
FC Cincinnati	2019	MLS	26	6	2	0	—		28	6
FC Cincinnati	Total		59	22	2	0	—		61	22
SJK	2020	Veikkausliiga	11	5	0	0	—		11	5
SJK	2021	Veikkausliiga	7	1	5	1	—		12	2
SJK	Total		18	6	5	1	—		23	7
Career total			246	55	21	3	10	4	277	62
