= Jamie Patterson =

Jamie Patterson may refer to:

- Jamie Patterson (model) (born c. 1975), beauty queen and model
- Jamie Patterson, character in No Angels (TV series)

== See also ==
- Jamie Paterson (disambiguation)
- James Patterson (disambiguation)
