= Andy Butler =

English football manager (born 1983)

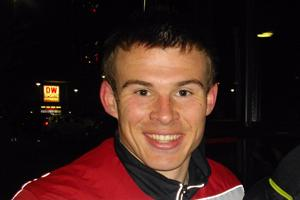
- Butler in 2011

Personal information
- Full name: Andrew Peter Butler
- Date of birth: 4 November 1983 (age 42)
- Place of birth: Doncaster, South Yorkshire, England
- Position: Defender

Youth career
- Scunthorpe United

Senior career*
Years	Team	Apps	(Gls)
2002–2008	Scunthorpe United	134	(15)
2006	→ Grimsby Town (loan)	4	(0)
2008–2010	Huddersfield Town	53	(4)
2010	→ Blackpool (loan)	7	(0)
2010–2014	Walsall	159	(14)
2014–2015	Sheffield United	0	(0)
2014	→ Walsall (loan)	7	(0)
2014–2015	→ Doncaster Rovers (loan)	9	(1)
2015–2019	Doncaster Rovers	184	(14)
2019–2020	Scunthorpe United	18	(0)
2020–2021	Doncaster Rovers	20	(0)
2021	Boston United	0	(0)
2022–2023	Farsley Celtic	39	(2)
2023–2024	Scunthorpe United	0	(0)
Total		634	(50)

Managerial career
- 2020–2022: Doncaster Rovers Belles
- 2021: Doncaster Rovers (caretaker)
- 2024–2026: Scunthorpe United
- * Club domestic league appearances and goals

Andrew Peter Butler (born 4 November 1983) is an English football coach and former player who was most recently first team manager at National League club Scunthorpe United.

Butler was a defender in a playing career that lasted from 2002 until 2021. He played for Scunthorpe United, Grimsby Town, Huddersfield Town, Blackpool, Sheffield United, Walsall, Doncaster Rovers, Boston United and Farsley Celtic. Butler is also a qualified referee, and has had two interim spells as Doncaster Rovers manager.

== Playing career ==
=== Scunthorpe United ===
Butler started his career at Scunthorpe United. He made his debut for the Iron, then in the Third Division, on 20 September 2003 as a 34th-minute substitute in a 1–1 draw with Leyton Orient at Brisbane Road. His full debut came three days later, a 2–3 defeat to Burnley at Glanford Park in the third round of the 2003–04 League Cup. Midway through the season Butler signed a four-year contract.

On 7 February 2004 he scored his first goal in a 2–2 home draw with Doncaster Rovers. He made a total of 42 appearances, scoring two goals in the 2003–04 season. The following season he scored ten goals in 37 league games as Scunthorpe finished second in League Two and were promoted to League One. His goal tally that season included scoring twice in a 3–2 home win over Lincoln City on 21 August 2004 and two goals in a 3–1 victory over Rushden & Diamonds at Nene Park on 18 December. He suffered a serious injury in early 2005 before returning to action later in the season. At the end of the season he won four different honours at the club's annual awards.

The 2005–06 season saw Butler suffer a string of injuries. On 14 January 2006 he was injured in a 1–1 draw with Bristol City at Ashton Gate and was ruled out for the rest of the season.

Prior to the start of the 2006–07 season Butler was injured again, dislocating his shoulder in a pre-season friendly with Leeds United. He was out of action until October 2006 when he joined League Two side Grimsby Town on loan, in order to build up his match fitness. He made five appearances for the Mariners. On his return to Scunthorpe he was unable to break back into the first team until later on in the season as the Iron won promotion to the Championship as League One champions.

In the 2007–08 season Butler made 36 league appearances, scoring two goals as the Iron finished 23rd in the Championship and were relegated back to League One. In May 2008 he appeared on Soccer AM's Crossbar Challenge on Sky Sports 1 dressed as Wonder Woman. Butler left Scunthorpe in June 2008, turning down a new three-year contract offer, so he could move to a club that would be more suitable for his family needs. In six years with the club, Butler made a total of 153 appearances scoring 13 times, playing for them in all three divisions of The Football League.

=== Huddersfield Town ===
On 2 July 2008 Butler joined League One club Huddersfield Town on a three-year deal. Along with five other players, he made his Huddersfield debut in a 1–1 draw with Stockport County at the Galpharm Stadium on 9 August 2008. His first goal came in a 3–2 home win over Crewe Alexandra on 1 November 2008. He made a total of 45 appearances in the 2008–09 season, scoring four goals. Butler began the 2009–10 season as a first team regular. However, Terriers manager Lee Clark started using Peter Clarke and Nathan Clarke as the club's regular centre back pairing.

On 7 January 2010, after not making an appearance for two months, Butler joined Championship side Blackpool on loan until the end of the season. On the move up a division Butler said, "I'm really happy with the move. It's a weird one because I've gone a step up, but it's something I'm hoping to thrive on. It looks a good club and I'm happy to be here. Hopefully I can play as many games as I can and help this club where it wants to go, which is the Premiership I suppose." He made his debut two days later in a 1–1 draw with Cardiff City at the Cardiff City Stadium.

After helping Blackpool reach the Premier League, Butler returned to the Galpharm, but had the remainder of his contract paid up on 23 June 2010. In October 2010 Butler joined Rochdale on a trial basis but failed to agree a contract.

=== Walsall ===
On 12 November 2010, Butler joined Football League One side Walsall on a contract until the end of the season. Butler was signed by Chris Hutchings, who was sacked on 4 January 2011—the day after a 4–1 defeat to Peterborough United—following a run of poor League form since the beginning of the season, which had seen Walsall sink to the bottom of League One. He was appointed captain after Dean Smith, the club's Head of Youth, took charge of the first team, and scored his first goal for Walsall in a 3–3 draw against fellow strugglers Tranmere Rovers on 8 January 2011. An impressive second half of the season earned Butler Walsall's Player of the Season and Players' Player of the Season awards. On 13 May 2011, Butler signed a new two-year contract, keeping him at the club until June 2013. In early May 2014, Butler was offered a new contract with Walsall, however, he rejected new terms with Walsall on 22 May; he made 176 appearances in total for the West Midlands club.

=== Sheffield United ===
On 5 June 2014, Butler signed a two-year deal with Sheffield United on a free transfer after rejecting the offer of a new deal with Walsall. On 13 August 2014, Butler scored on his début against Mansfield Town in the League Cup. On 11 September 2014, Butler was loaned to former club Walsall on a one-month loan deal after finding first team football hard to come by at United. Butler returned to Sheffield United on 20 October 2014.

=== Doncaster Rovers ===
On 23 October 2014, Butler went out on loan to home-town club Doncaster Rovers until January 2015. On 6 January 2015, Butler signed permanently for Doncaster Rovers for an undisclosed fee on a two-and-a-half-year deal, having made 13 appearances during his loan spell.

He went on to play in 222 games and scoring 17 goals for the club. Manager Darren Ferguson made Butler the Club Captain at the beginning of the 2016–17 season, a position he retained until leaving Doncaster. Butler was one of the four nominees for EFL League One Player of the Month in both January 2015 and December 2017, "Led the defence by example with a superb goal-line clearance against Oldham and then headed Rovers in front in the same game – one of two goals he scored in December".

He was named as PFA Player in the Community for the 2016–17 season in recognition of his community work in and around his hometown of Doncaster.

In 2017, Butler became a member of the management committee of the PFA.

He was offered a new contract, a one-year deal including coaching, by Doncaster at the end of the 2018–19 season however this was on greatly reduced terms by then manager Grant McCann.

=== Later career ===
He decided to make a return to Scunthorpe United.

On 11 September 2020 he was signed by Rovers on a contract until January 2021. On 1 March 2021, Butler was placed in charge of Doncaster following the departure of Darren Moore until the end of the season. Butler returned to the Belles dugout after his short managerial tenure with Doncaster Rovers concluded.

In July 2021, Butler dropped into non-league for the first time when he signed a contract for National League North side Boston United before leaving the club after just two months.

In July 2022, Butler joined National League North club Farsley Celtic.

== Coaching career ==
On 16 January 2020, Butler was appointed manager of women's team Doncaster Rovers Belles. This was a role held by Butler until September 2022 when he resigned in order for a full-time role at Scunthorpe United.

Several months after signing for Boston, Butler was appointed as a first team coach at Peterborough United with Boston claiming this move was a breach of contract.

Peterborough announced on 29 December 2021 that Butler had left his coaching role and was back with Doncaster Rovers assisting their first team.

On 5 October 2022, Butler was appointed as Youth Development Phase Coach at former club Scunthorpe United.

On 3 May 2024, Butler was appointed manager of Scunthorpe United, promoted from his previous role of first-team coach. An unbeaten start to his time in charge of the club saw him named the National League North Manager of the Month for August 2024.

Butler led Scunthorpe to promotion from the National League after a 2–1 win against Chester on 18 May 2025.

On 28 October 2026, Scunthorpe announced that Butler had been relieved of his duties as first team manager.

== Career statistics ==
As of 6 February 2021

Club statistics
Club	Season	League			FA Cup		League Cup		Other		Total	
Club	Season	Division	Apps	Goals	Apps	Goals	Apps	Goals	Apps	Goals	Apps	Goals
Scunthorpe United	2003–04	Third Division	34	2	4	0	1	0	3 (Note: Appearance(s) in Football League Trophy)	0	42	2
Scunthorpe United	2004–05	League Two	37	10	3	0	1	0	0	0	41	10
Scunthorpe United	2005–06	League One	16	1	3	0	1	0	2	0	22	1
Scunthorpe United	2006–07	League One	11	0	0	0	0	0	0	0	11	0
Scunthorpe United	2007–08	Championship	36	2	0	0	1	0	—		37	2
Scunthorpe United	Total		134	15	10	0	4	0	5	0	153	15
Grimsby Town (loan)	2006–07	League Two	4	0	0	0	0	0	1	0	5	0
Huddersfield Town	2008–09	League One	42	4	1	0	1	0	1	0	45	4
Huddersfield Town	2009–10	League One	11	0	0	0	1	0	1	0	13	0
Huddersfield Town	Total		53	4	1	0	2	0	2	0	58	4
Blackpool (loan)	2009–10	Championship	7	0	0	0	0	0	0	0	7	0
Walsall	2010–11	League One	31	4	1	0	0	0	0	0	32	4
Walsall	2011–12	League One	42	5	3	0	1	0	2	0	48	5
Walsall	2012–13	League One	41	3	2	0	2	0	1	0	46	3
Walsall	2013–14	League One	45	2	2	0	2	0	1	0	50	2
Walsall	Total		159	14	8	0	5	0	4	0	176	14
Sheffield United	2014–15	League One	0	0	0	0	1	1	0	0	1	1
Walsall (loan)	2014–15	League One	7	0	0	0	0	0	0	0	7	0
Doncaster Rovers	2014–15 (Note: Butler made 13 appearances on loan for the club before joining permanently on 6 January 2015)	League One	9	1	3	0	0	0	1	0	13	1
Doncaster Rovers	2014–15	League One	24	2	1	0	0	0	0	0	25	2
Doncaster Rovers	2015–16	League One	40	4	3	0	2	0	2	0	47	4
Doncaster Rovers	2016–17	League Two	44	3	1	0	1	0	0	0	46	3
Doncaster Rovers	2017–18	League One	36	4	3	0	2	0	2 (Note: Appearances in EFL Trophy)	0	43	4
Doncaster Rovers	2018–19	League One	40	1	4	1	1	0	3 (Note: 1 Appearance in EFL Trophy and 2 in League One Play-offs)	1 (Note: Goal in League One Play-offs)	48	3
Scunthorpe United	2019–20	League Two	18	0	1	0	1	0	1	0	21	0
Doncaster Rovers	2020–21	League One	20	0	2	0	0	0	1	0	23	0
Doncaster Rovers	Total		213	15	17	1	6	0	9	1	255	17
Career total			595	48	37	1	19	1	22	1	673	51

== Managerial statistics ==
As of match played 27 October 2026

Managerial record by team and tenure
Team	From	To	Record				
Team	From	To	P	W	D	L	Win %
Doncaster Rovers (caretaker)	1 March 2021	17 May 2021	18	4	3	11	22.2
Scunthorpe United	3 May 2024	28 October 2026	127	62	29	36	48.8
Total			145	66	32	47	45.5

== Honours ==
=== As a player ===
Scunthorpe United

- Football League One: 2006–07
- Football League Two runner-up: 2004–05

Doncaster Rovers

- EFL League Two third-place promotion: 2016–17

Individual

- Scunthorpe United Player of the Year: 2004–05
- Walsall Player of the Year: 2010–11

=== As a manager ===
Scunthorpe United

- National League North play-offs: 2025
- Lincolnshire Senior Cup: 2024–25

Individual

- National League North Manager of the Month: August 2024
