= Connor Taylor (footballer, born 1992) =

English footballer

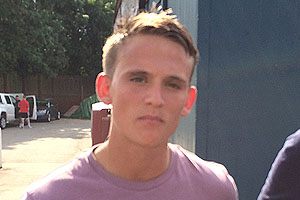
- Taylor in August 2011

Personal information
- Full name: Connor Joseph Taylor
- Date of birth: 5 September 1992 (age 34)
- Place of birth: Coventry, England
- Height: 1.80 m (5 ft 11 in)
- Position: Forward

Team information
- Current team: Leamington

Youth career
- Coventry Sphinx
- –2011: Aston Villa

Senior career*
Years	Team	Apps	(Gls)
2011–2012	Aston Villa	0	(0)
2012	→ Tamworth (loan)	8	(1)
2012–2013	Walsall	0	(0)
2012–2013	→ Nuneaton Town (loan)	18	(1)
2013–2014	Nuneaton Town	22	(0)
2014–2018	Tamworth	137	(14)
2018–2021	Leamington	53	(1)
2021–2022	Bromsgrove Sporting	23	(4)
2022–	Leamington	0	(0)
- * Club domestic league appearances and goals as of 12:39, 24 March 2022 (UTC)

Connor Joseph Taylor (born 5 September 1992) is an English footballer who plays for Leamington, where he plays as a forward.

== Playing career ==
=== Aston Villa ===
Taylor began his professional career with Premier League side Aston Villa. However, his time at the club was unsuccessful, and he was released on 23 May 2012 without having made an appearance.

=== Tamworth (loan) ===
On 2 March 2012, Taylor agreed to join Conference National side Tamworth on a month-long loan deal. In total, he made eight appearances for the club and scored his one and only goal for The Lambs in a 1–1 draw with Grimsby Town.

=== Walsall ===
Following his release by Aston Villa, Taylor signed a one-year contract with League One side Walsall on 1 August 2012, arriving at the Banks's Stadium on the same day as former West Bromwich Albion player Paul Downing. He only made one appearance for the club, playing the entirety of a 3–0 defeat in the League Cup away to Queens Park Rangers on 28 August 2012. Taylor was released by Walsall on 9 May 2013, along with Richard Taundry, George Bowerman, Aaron Williams and Jake Jones.

=== Nuneaton Town (loan) ===
In October 2012, whilst still at Walsall, he joined Football Conference side Nuneaton Town on a one-month loan, which was later extended. He made 18 appearances with the club and scored one goal in a 1–1 home draw with Mansfield Town on 6 November 2012.

=== Nuneaton Town ===
Following been released by Walsall, Taylor signed a permanent deal with Nuneaton Town on 9 July 2013, joining the club on the same day as on-loan Birmingham City defender Amari'i Bell In total, he made 22 appearances with the club during the 2013–14 season. He was invited back to training for on 1 May 2014 for the subsequent 2014–15 season by manager Brian Reid, despite being out of contract with the club.

=== Tamworth ===
On 3 June 2014, Taylor re-joined newly relegated Conference North side Tamworth, where he signed a one-year deal, and was joined by former Nuneaton Town colleagues James Belshaw and Jon Adams.

=== Leamington ===
Despite the offer of a new contract from Tamworth, Connor joined Leamington on 21 May 2018, securing an immediate return to the National League North.

=== Bromsgrove Sporting ===
Following a three-year spell with Leamington, Taylor opted to sign for Southern League Premier Division Central side Bromsgrove Sporting on 16 July 2021.

=== Return to Leamington ===
On 23 March 2022, Taylor returned to former club Leamington.

== Career statistics ==
As of match played 19 March 2022.

Appearances and goals by club, season and competition
Club	Season	League			FA Cup		League Cup		Other (Note: Includes other competitive competitions, including the FA Trophy)		Total	
Club	Season	Division	Apps	Goals	Apps	Goals	Apps	Goals	Apps	Goals	Apps	Goals
Aston Villa	2011–12	Premier League	0	0	0	0	0	0	0	0	0	0
Tamworth (loan)	2011–12	Conference National	8	1	0	0	—		0	0	8	1
Walsall	2012–13	League One	0	0	0	0	1	0	0	0	1	0
Nuneaton Town (loan)	2012–13	Conference National	18	1	2	0	—		1	0	20	1
Nuneaton Town	2013–14	Conference National	22	0	0	0	—		3	0	22	0
Tamworth	2014–15	Conference North	35	3	1	0	—		1	0	37	3
Tamworth	2015–16	Conference North	34	3	0	0	—		0	0	34	3
Tamworth	2016–17	Conference North	29	3	0	0	—		0	0	29	3
Tamworth	2017–18	Conference North	39	5	0	0	—		0	0	39	5
Tamworth	Tamworth		137	14	1	0	0	0	1	0	139	14
Leamington	2018–19	Conference North	28	0	0	0	—		0	0	26	0
Leamington	2019–20	Conference North	21	1	0	0	—		0	0	21	1
Leamington	2020–21	Conference North	4	0	0	0	—		2 (Note: Two appearances in FA Trophy)	0	6	0
Leamington	Leamington		53	1	0	0	0	0	2	0	55	1
Bromsgrove Sporting	2021–22	Southern League Premier Division Central	23	4	3	0	—		6 (Note: Two appearances in the FA Trophy, three appearances in the Southern League Cup and one appearance in the Worcestershire Senior Cup)	0	32	4
Career totals			261	21	6	0	1	0	13	0	277	21
