= James Paterson (rugby league) =

English rugby league footballer

Personal information
- Full name: James Buckley Paterson
- Born: 19 April 1898 Wakefield district, England
- Died: fourth ¼ 1969 (aged 71) Wakefield district, England

Playing information
- Position: Stand-off/Five-eighth
Club
Years	Team	Pld	T	G	FG	P
1921–22	Wakefield Trinity	8	0	0	0	0

James "Jim" Buckley Paterson (19 April 1898 – fourth ¼ 1969), also known by the nickname of 'JB', was an English professional rugby league footballer who played in the 1920s. He played at club level for Wakefield Trinity, as a stand-off.

== Background ==
Jim Paterson's birth was registered in Wakefield district, West Riding of Yorkshire, England, and his death aged 71 was registered in Wakefield district, West Riding of Yorkshire, England.

== Playing career ==
=== Notable tour matches ===
Jim Paterson played stand-off in Wakefield Trinity's 3-29 defeat by Australia in the 1921–22 Kangaroo tour of Great Britain match at Belle Vue, Wakefield on Saturday 22 October 1921.
