= James John Patterson =

New Zealand blacksmith, farmer, and landowner

James John Patterson (1859–1937) was a New Zealand blacksmith, farmer and landowner. He was born in New Plymouth, Taranaki, New Zealand in 1859.
