= Jimmy Paterson (Australian footballer) =

Australian rules footballer

Personal information
- Full name: James Paterson
- Born: 25 February 1870; Mortlake, Victoria
- Died: 18 January 1927 (aged 56); Preston, Victoria
- Original team: Preston

Playing career^{1}
Years	Club	Games (Goals)
1899	South Melbourne	1 (0)
- ^{1} Playing statistics correct to the end of 1899.

Jimmy Paterson (25 February 1870 – 18 January 1927) was an Australian rules footballer who played with South Melbourne in the Victorian Football League (VFL).
