= Julian Gray =

English footballer (born 1979)

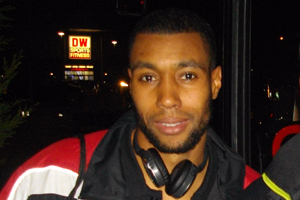
- Gray in 2011

Personal information
- Full name: Julian Raymond Marvin Gray
- Date of birth: 21 September 1979 (age 47)
- Place of birth: Lewisham, England
- Height: 6 ft 1 in (1.85 m)
- Position: Left winger

Senior career*
Years	Team	Apps	(Gls)
1996–2000	Arsenal	1	(0)
2000–2004	Crystal Palace	125	(11)
2003	→ Cardiff City (loan)	9	(0)
2004–2007	Birmingham City	60	(3)
2007–2009	Coventry City	29	(4)
2008–2009	→ Fulham (loan)	0	(0)
2009	Fulham	1	(0)
2009	Barnsley	5	(0)
2010–2011	Walsall	61	(14)
2011–2013	Nea Salamis Famagusta	55	(8)
2013–2014	Walsall	12	(1)
Total		358	(41)
- * Club domestic league appearances and goals

Julian Raymond Marvin Gray (born 21 September 1979) is an English football coach and former professional player.

He played in the Football League and Premier League for Arsenal, Crystal Palace, Cardiff City, Birmingham City, Coventry City, Fulham, Barnsley and Walsall, and in Cyprus for Nea Salamis Famagusta.

== Club career ==
Gray was born in Lewisham, in south London. He began his association with Arsenal as a seven-year-old, and made one substitute for the first team before making a switch across London in July 2000 to join Crystal Palace for a £500,000 fee. He is an attacking left winger who can also play as an auxiliary striker, and has learnt full-back duties so he can help out in defence. Gray played a key part in helping them achieve promotion in the 2003–04 season, despite missing the play-off final through suspension. In addition to his successes during that season he spent a two-month spell on loan with Cardiff City. One of Gray's most memorable games for Palace was when he scored in a man-of-the-match performance as Palace surprisingly knocked Liverpool out of the 2002–03 FA Cup at Anfield.

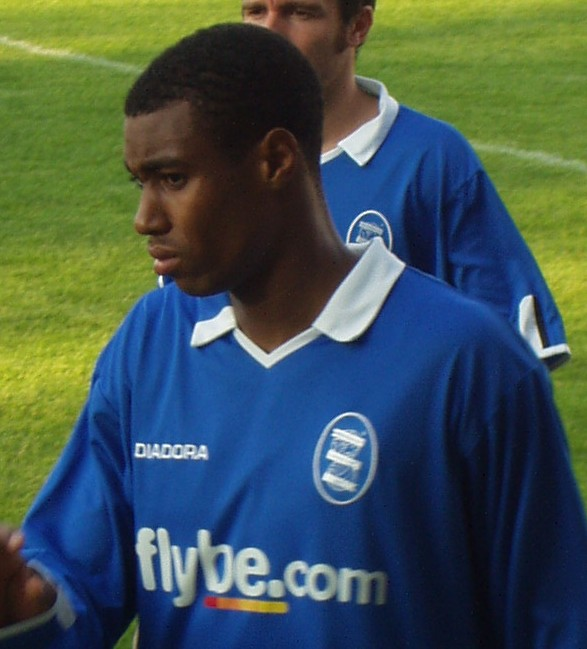
Gray with Birmingham City in 2004

Gray's contract expired in June 2004, allowing him to sign for Birmingham City on a free transfer. He made 32 Premier League appearances in his first season in the Midlands, and remained a key part of manager Steve Bruce's plans during the 2005–06 season, although an ankle injury kept him out for several weeks towards the end of the campaign, but started only twice as the team returned to the Premier League in 2007 and was released at the end of that season.

He joined Coventry City on 10 July 2007. He signed for Fulham on a season-long loan on 1 September 2008, and despite not playing a single league game for the club, the move was made permanent for an undisclosed fee on 2 February 2009. He made only one substitute appearance for Fulham, and was released at the end of the season.

In July 2009 Gray went on Sheffield United's pre-season tour of Malta as part of a trial with the club, and the following month he had a trial with former club Cardiff City. Gray signed for Barnsley on 15 September, initially on a monthly contract. He was released after two months, during which he made seven appearances in all competitions and started only one Championship game. Gray joined Walsall in February 2010, and was offered a new deal by the club at the end of the season. He scored his first goal of the 2010–11 season in the 2–1 victory over Brentford with a volley from a Darren Byfield cross.

After leaving Walsall when his contract expired, Gray spent two seasons in Cyprus with Nea Salamis Famagusta. He returned to England in 2013, and trained with Walsall before signing a contract with them on 27 September, to run until January of the following year. Gray made his second debut for the club on 12 October, as a 71st-minute substitute for James Baxendale in a 1–1 draw away at Colchester United. He was released when his contract expired.

== Coaching career ==
Gray joined the staff of Arsenal's academy in 2019, and became under-18s assistant coach in 2021. He holds the UEFA A Licence. He was appointed as lead under-15s coach in Birmingham City's academy in August 2024.

After serving an interim spell, Gray was appointed as permanent assistant head coach of Crawley Town in May 2026 alongside head coach Colin Kazim-Richards. On 21 October 2026, both Gray and Kazim-Richards were relieved of their duties at Crawley, with the club bottom of EFL League Two with only five points from the first ten games of the season.

== Honours ==
- Crystal Palace Young Player of the Year: 2002
