= James Baxendale (footballer, born 1992) =

English footballer

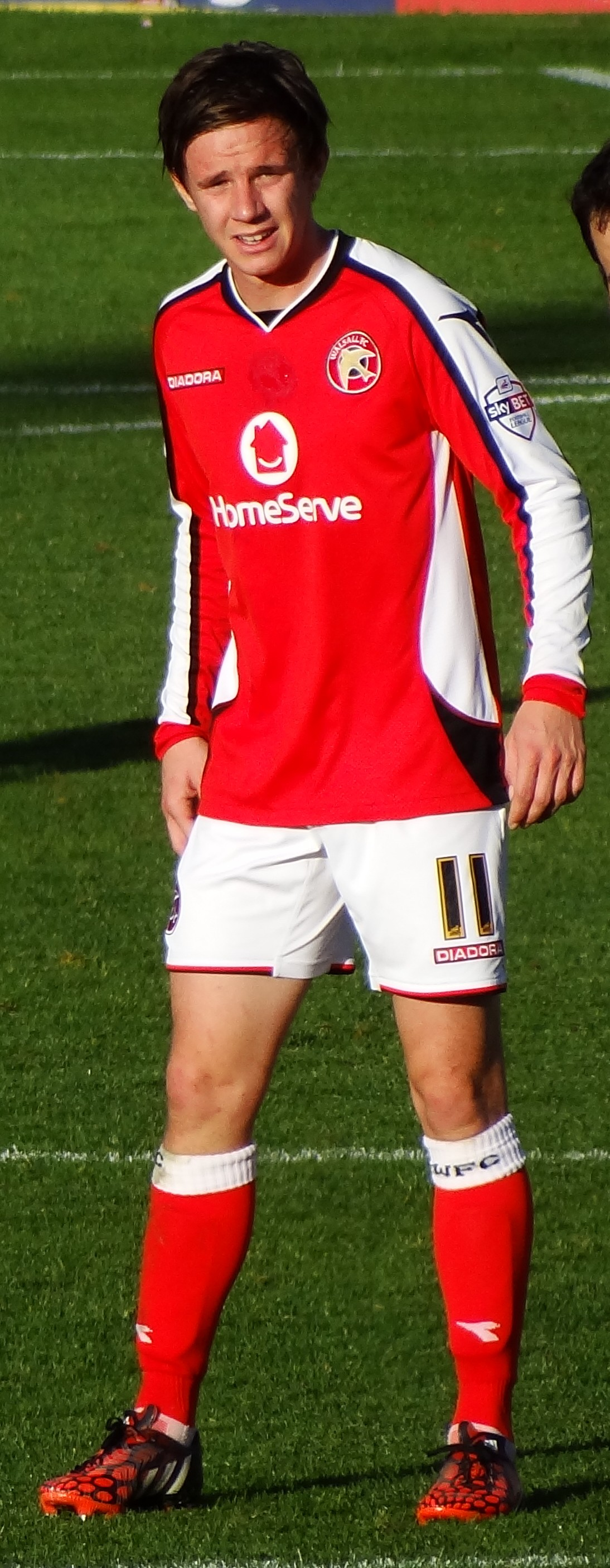
- Baxendale in action for Walsall in 2014

Personal information
- Full name: James Robert Baxendale
- Date of birth: 16 September 1992 (age 34)
- Place of birth: Thorne, England
- Height: 5 ft 8 in (1.73 m)
- Position: Midfielder

Team information
- Current team: Club Thorne Colliery (manager)

Youth career
- 2008–2010: Leeds United

Senior career*
Years	Team	Apps	(Gls)
2010–2011	Leeds United	0	(0)
2011–2012	Doncaster Rovers	2	(0)
2011	→ Buxton (loan)	5	(0)
2012	→ Hereford United (loan)	1	(0)
2012–2016	Walsall	103	(7)
2016	→ Mansfield Town (loan)	6	(1)
2016–2017	Mansfield Town	21	(0)
2017	Orange County	14	(0)
2017–2018	Alfreton Town	13	(0)
2018–2019	Kidderminster Harriers	15	(0)
2019	→ Nuneaton Borough (loan)	3	(0)
2019	Nuneaton Borough	5	(0)
2019	Mickleover Sports	4	(0)
2019	Grantham Town	11	(0)
2019–2020	Pontefract Collieries	15	(5)
2020–2021	Worksop Town	23	(3)
2021–2022	Sheffield	20	(5)
2022–2023	Pontefract Collieries	18	(0)
2023–2024	Armthorpe Welfare		

Managerial career
- 2023–2024: Armthorpe Welfare
- 2024: Frickley Athletic
- 2024-: Armthorpe Welfare
- 2025-: Club Thorne Colliery F.C.
- * Club domestic league appearances and goals as of 15:53, 12 January 2023 (UTC)

James Robert Baxendale (born 16 September 1992) is an English former professional footballer who played as a midfielder. He is first team manager of Club Thorne Colliery.

== Early life ==
Born in Thorne, South Yorkshire, Baxendale attended The McAuley Catholic High School in Doncaster.

== Career ==
=== Doncaster Rovers ===
Baxendale came through the youth setup at Yorkshire rivals Leeds United and was a regular for the Under-18 side, however he failed to win a professional contract at Elland Road and was released at the end of the 2010–11 season. After leaving the club, he signed a one-year contract for Football League Championship side Doncaster Rovers on 1 July 2011 on a free transfer. He made his professional debut on 9 August 2011, in the League Cup win over Tranmere Rovers at the Keepmoat Stadium, coming on as a substitute for Ryan Mason. He made his league debut four days later against West Ham United.

On 24 November 2011, he moved on loan to Northern Premier League side Buxton. Baxendale won Buxton's player of the month for December 2011 after a string of impressive displays. His loan spell at Buxton soon extended by 60 days, the maximum allowed under FA rules. In early March, Baxendale's loan spell at Buxton had soon ended.

On 22 March 2012, Hereford United then signed both Baxendale and James Chambers on loan from Doncaster Rovers. On 13 April 2012, Baxendale came onto replace Chambers against Barnet at Underhill to make his debut for the 'Bulls'. The game resulted in a 1–1 draw. In May 2012, Baxendale was released by the club after the expiry of his contract.

=== Walsall ===
On 2 August 2012, Baxendale signed a one-year contract with League One side Walsall and was given number 16.

Baxendale made his Walsall debut, coming on as a second-half substitute for Ashley Hemmings, in a 3–0 loss against his former club, Doncaster Rovers in the opening game of the season. He then scored his first goal for the club, in a 2–1 win over Portsmouth on 15 September 2012. Seven days later, on 22 September 2012, he scored again, in a 3–1 win over Preston North End. Due to his impressive performance at Walsall, he signed an 18-month contract with Walsall in January 2013. He later added two more goals against Preston North End and Oldham Athletic. Towards the end of the season, Baxendale found himself in and out of the starting eleven for the side. In his first season at Walsall, he went on to make a total of 34 appearances and scoring 4 times in all competitions. Reflecting on the 2012–13 season, Baxendale says he enjoyed every minutes and described this as his first real season.

In the 2013–14 season, Baxendale's impressive form was rewarded when he signed a new three-year contract at Walsall. Shortly after, Baxendale scored the late winner, as he helped Walsall win the second time in the row, in a 2–1 win over Port Vale. Four days later, on 10 August 2013, Baxendale scored again, in a 1–0 win over Oldham Athletic. A month later, he scored again, in a 3–0 win over Crewe Alexandra on 14 September 2013. He continued to impress for the side, having come off from the substitute bench in number of matches. However, despite making the total of 45 appearances and scoring 3 times in the 2013–14 season, Baxendale find himself in and out of the first team, citing "indifferent form and a niggling injury."

In the 2014–15 season, Baxendale initially started out on the substitute bench before regaining his first team place soon after, in which Manager Dean Smith supported Baxendale to rediscover his form. He then scored his first goal of the season, in a 3–0 win over Doncaster Rovers on 27 September 2014. Although he featured in the first team, his form soon became "ineffective" and resulted being placed on the substitute bench in number of games. However, his performance "several misfiring displays" led him to playing in the reserve side for the rest of the season. Because of this, Baxendale was dropped from the first team squad for the rest of the season.

Ahead of the 2015–16 season, Baxendale was among strikers to be called out by Smith for their failure "to find the target more than five times during the 2014-15 campaign." However, he struggled in the first team and appeared on the substitute bench for most of the games in the first half of the season, restricting him to six appearances.

=== Mansfield Town ===
On 9 January 2016, Baxendale signed for Mansfield Town on a one-month loan.

Baxendale scored on his debut against Stevenage, also gaining the man of the match award. After a quick impact made at the club, He made his moved to Field Mill permanent on 1 February 2016. Initially appearing a handful of matches at the start of his Mansfield Town career, Baxendale soon dropped to the substitute bench soon after. He later managed to regain his place later in the 2015–16 season. At the end of the season, Baxendale went on to make a total of 15 appearances and scoring once for the side.

In the 2016–17 season, Baxendale made his first appearance of the season on 9 August 2016, starting and played for 71 minutes before being substituted, in a 3–1 loss against Blackburn Rovers in the first round of EFL Cup. However, he struggled to regain his first team place at Mansfield Town and appeared on the substitute bench. As a result, Baxendale was demoted to the club's reserve side. Despite this, he played a vital role against Oldham Athletic in the last-16 of the EFL League Trophy, when he set up two goals, in a 2–0 win on 10 January 2017. After making a total of 19 appearances for the side, he was released by Mansfield at the end of the 2016–17 season.

=== Orange County SC ===
After being released by Mansfield Town, Baxendale was determined to prove himself by uploading YouTube videos of himself training to convince potential clubs of his fitness. Two months later, on 26 July 2017, Baxendale joined United Soccer League side Orange County SC.

Baxendale made his Orange County SC debut on 3 August 2017, where he came on as a second-half substitute, in a 1–0 loss against LA Galaxy II. At Orange County SC, he played as "a box-to-box midfielder, but for the most part, stayed out of the attack almost altogether." He then played as a captain for the first time on 18 September 2017, in a 2–1 win over Whitecaps FC 2. At the end of the 2017 season, he made 14 appearances for the side and left the club in 2018 to return to English football.

=== Return to England ===
On 19 December 2017, following his release from Orange County, Baxendale returned to England to join National League North side Alfreton Town. He went onto appear just thirteen times in the league before leaving the club at the end of the season.

On 12 July 2018, Baxendale joined fellow National League North side Kidderminster Harriers on a short-term deal. In January 2019, Baxendale was loaned out to Nuneaton Borough for two months, but he was recalled in the beginning of February 2019 after playing three games for the club. A few days later Nuneaton Borough announced, that he had been released by Kidderminster Harriers and signed permanently for Nuneaton Borough. After his permanent move, he played five games but left the club on 14 March 2019, where he joined Mickleover Sports.

On 4 June 2019, Grantham Town announced the signing of Baxendale. After a season at Worksop Town, Baxendale signed for Northern Premier League East Division side Sheffield in December 2021.

In May 2022, Baxendale returned to Pontefract Collieries for a second spell. It was later confirmed that he would have a player-coach role. He left the club in August 2023 to join Armthorpe Welfare as player-manager.

== Managerial career ==
Baxendale was appointed manager of Armthorpe Welfare in August 2023. He was joined by assistants Matthew Flanagan and Andrew Steptoe, and Baxendale was confirmed to also be registering as a player. Baxendale was successful in avoiding relegation with the club and securing a place in the NCEL Division One for the 2024-2025 season.

In May 2024, Baxendale was appointed first team manager of NCEL Premier Division team Frickley Athletic, and was once again joined by assistants Matthew Flanagan and Andrew Steptoe. Following a poor start to the season, Baxendale resigned in October, with the team only two points ahead of the relegation places. Two days later, he returned to Armthorpe Welfare as manager.

== Personal life ==
Growing up, Baxendale supported Nottingham Forest and Sheffield Wednesday, having received a season ticket at Nottingham Forest as a young kid.

Even after leaving Doncaster Rovers, Baxendale said he "still live in Doncaster in the summer. My home is there and I go back quite regularly so I will have a lot of friends and family there at the game – Doncaster fans who will want tickets in the Walsall end!".

== Career statistics ==
As of match played 8 September 2018

Appearances and goals by club, season and competition
Club	Season	League			National Cup		League Cup		Other		Total	
Club	Season	Division	Apps	Goals	Apps	Goals	Apps	Goals	Apps	Goals	Apps	Goals
Doncaster Rovers	2011–12	Championship	2	0	0	0	1	0	—		3	0
Hereford United (loan)	2011–12	League Two	1	0	0	0	—		0	0	1	0
Walsall	2012–13	League One	32	4	0	0	1	0	1 (Note: Appearances in Football League Trophy)	0	34	4
Walsall	2013–14	League One	40	2	2	0	2	1	1	0	45	3
Walsall	2014–15	League One	28	1	2	0	2	0	5	0	37	1
Walsall	2015–16	League One	3	0	1	0	1	0	1	0	6	0
Walsall	Total		103	7	5	0	6	1	8	0	122	8
Mansfield Town (loan)	2015–16	League Two	6	1	—		—		0	0	6	1
Mansfield Town	2015–16	League Two	9	0	—		—		0	0	9	0
Mansfield Town	2016–17	League Two	12	0	1	0	1	0	5 (Note: Appearances in EFL Trophy)	0	19	0
Mansfield Town	Total		21	0	1	0	1	0	5	0	28	0
Orange County	2017	USL	14	0	0	0	0	0	—		14	0
Alfreton Town	2017–18	National League North	13	0	—		—		—		13	0
Kidderminster Harriers	2018–19	National League North	3	0	0	0	—		0	0	3	0
Career total			166	8	6	0	8	1	13	0	193	9

== Honours ==
Walsall

- Football League Trophy runner-up: 2014–15
