= James Paterson (footballer) =

Scottish footballer

Personal information
- Full name: James Paterson
- Date of birth: 15 June 1905
- Place of birth: Cowdenbeath, Scotland
- Date of death: 30 December 1978 (aged 73)
- Place of death: Bridge of Allan, Scotland
- Height: 5 ft 7 1/2 in (1.71 m)
- Position: Inside forward

Youth career
- Causewayhead United
- Strathallan Hawthorn

Senior career*
Years	Team	Apps	(Gls)
–	Camelon Juniors		
1926–1927	Everton	0	(0)
1927–1930	St Johnstone	45	(18)
1930–1932	Cowdenbeath	74	(53)
1932–1935	Leicester City	48	(17)
1935–1938	Reading	72	(23)
1938–1939	Clapton Orient	5	(0)
Total		244	(111)

International career
1931	Scotland	3	(0)
- * Club domestic league appearances and goals

James Paterson (15 June 1905 – 30 December 1978) was a Scottish footballer who played as an inside forward.

== Career ==
Born in Cowdenbeath into a family with links to Stirlingshire, Paterson played club football for Camelon Juniors, Everton (no senior appearances), St Johnstone, Cowdenbeath, Leicester City, Reading, Clapton Orient and made three appearances for Scotland in 1931.
