= Jamie Paterson (footballer, born 1991) =

English footballer (born 1991)

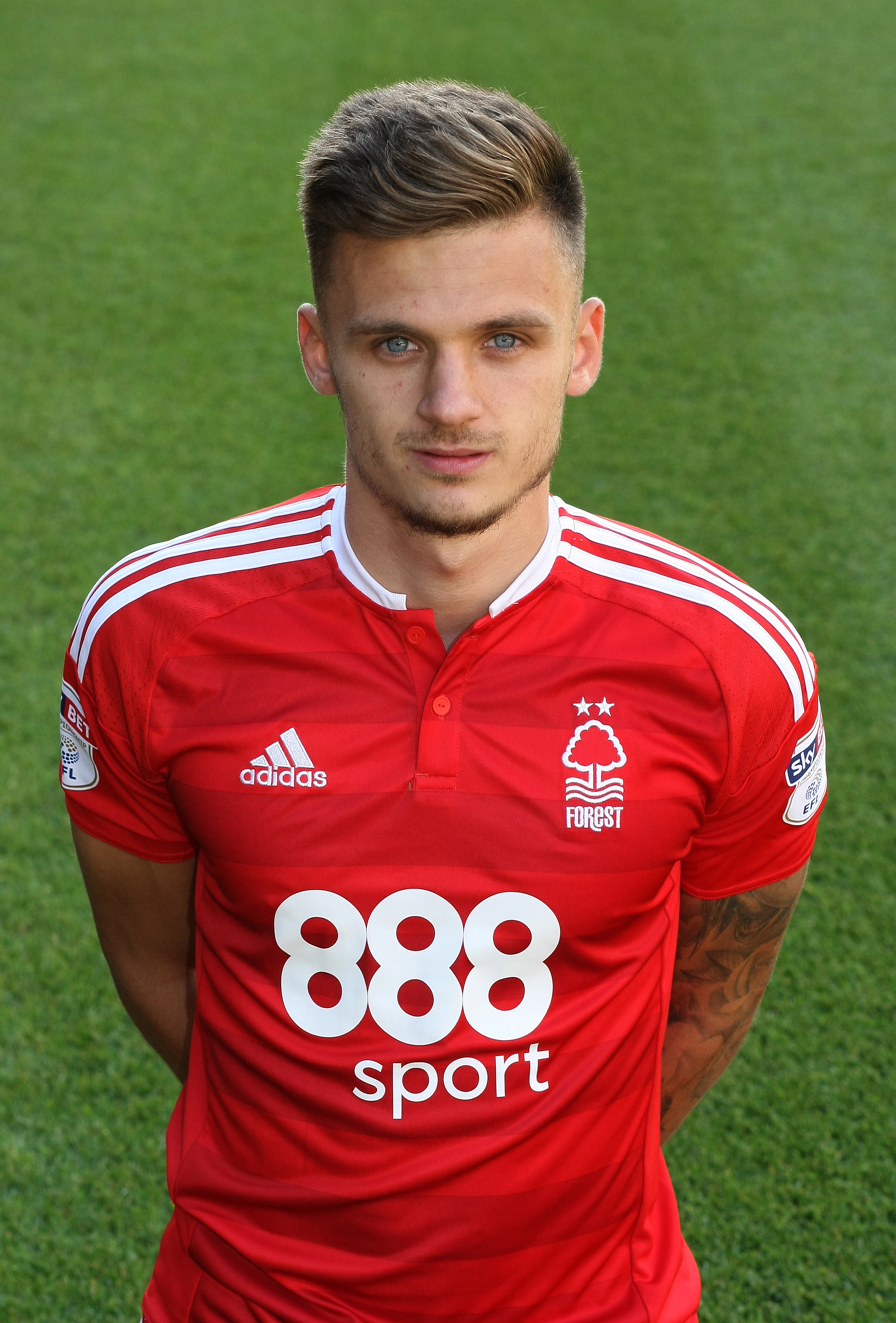
- Paterson with Nottingham Forest in 2016

Personal information
- Full name: Jamie Charles Stuart Paterson
- Date of birth: 20 December 1991 (age 34)
- Place of birth: Coventry, England
- Height: 5 ft 9 in (1.75 m)
- Positions: Winger; forward

Team information
- Current team: Rochdale
- Number: 35

Senior career*
Years	Team	Apps	(Gls)
2010–2013	Walsall	94	(15)
2013–2016	Nottingham Forest	55	(9)
2015–2016	→ Huddersfield Town (loan)	34	(6)
2016–2021	Bristol City	145	(23)
2019–2020	→ Derby County (loan)	10	(1)
2021–2024	Swansea City	105	(16)
2024	Charlotte FC	4	(0)
2025	Coventry City	8	(1)
2025–2026	Plymouth Argyle	21	(0)
2026–	Rochdale	0	(0)
- * Club domestic league appearances and goals as of 18:06, 23 October 2026 (UTC)

Jamie Charles Stuart Paterson (born 20 December 1991) is an English professional footballer who plays as a forward for EFL League Two club Rochdale. He can also operate as both a winger and forward.

== Career ==
=== Walsall ===
Born in Coventry, Paterson made his senior debut for Walsall on 31 August 2010, in a 2–1 defeat to Chesterfield in the Football League Trophy, making his league début four days later, in a 1–0 home loss to Colchester United. His first goal for the club came over a year later, as he scored in a 1–1 draw against Huddersfield Town on 5 November 2011. His second and third league goals came in a 2–1 loss to Bury on 2 January 2012, and in a 2–2 draw against Sheffield Wednesday on 20 March. His first goal of the 2012–13 season came on 1 September, as he opened the scoring in a 2–2 draw against Brentford. His scoring rate increased from his previous two seasons, and he scored his seventh goal of the season on 1 January 2013 to give Walsall a 1–0 win against Stevenage. He then stated that his target for the season was to score 10 goals, and that the team had regained their confidence following three wins in the last four games. On 2 February, he scored twice in a 3–1 win against Oldham Athletic. On 1 April, he gave a superb performance against Coventry City by scoring twice in a 4–0 win

=== Nottingham Forest ===
On 2 July 2013, Paterson signed for Nottingham Forest on a three-year deal. The fee was undisclosed, however it was believed it was a six-figure fee with add-ons taking the total amount beyond £1million. He scored his first goal for the club in a pre-season friendly against Belgian side Royal Antwerp on 20 July. His first competitive goals came when he scored a hat-trick against West Ham United in the FA Cup third round on 5 January 2014. He scored his first league goal for the club in the following game, opening the scoring in a 1–1 draw away at Bolton Wanderers. He scored for the third game in a row on 18 January, scoring in a 4–1 win at home to Blackburn Rovers. On 11 February, he scored twice in a 3–0 win against Huddersfield Town. Paterson finished the 2013–14 season scoring 12 goals in 39 appearances in all competitions.

With the signing of Michail Antonio in the close season, Paterson's game time was not as frequent during the 2014–15 season. He made 25 appearances in all competitions, scoring only once in a 5–3 victory against Fulham on 17 September 2014.

==== Huddersfield Town loan ====
On 1 September 2015, as the transfer window closed, Paterson joined Huddersfield Town on a season-long loan with a view to making the move permanent. He made his début for Town in the 2–0 loss against Cardiff City on 12 September. He scored his first goal for the club in the 2–0 win over Milton Keynes Dons on 21 October 2015.

=== Bristol City ===
On 27 August 2016, Paterson was presented to Bristol City fans as a new signing, on a three-year contract. He scored his first goal for Bristol City in a 2–1 win against former club Nottingham Forest on 1 October 2016. Paterson featured as Bristol City reached the semi-finals of the 2017-18 EFL Cup with wins over Premier League opponents Watford FC, Stoke City, Crystal Palace F.C. and Manchester United. Paterson played as City lost in the semi-final tie against Premier League leaders Manchester City.

On 5 January 2019 Paterson featured as Bristol City won 1–0 to upset Premier League side Huddersfield Town FC in the FA Cup third round.

==== Derby County loan ====
On 8 August 2019, as the transfer window closed, Paterson joined Derby County on a season-long loan. He scored his first goal for Derby in a 3–2 win over Birmingham City on 28 September. The loan was cut short on 30 December 2019 after Bristol City exercised a recall clause in the loan agreement.

=== Swansea City ===
On 6 August 2021 he signed for Swansea City after being on trial at Middlesbrough. The following day he scored on his debut in a 2–1 defeat to Blackburn Rovers.

=== Charlotte FC ===
On 22 August 2024, Paterson signed for Major League Soccer club Charlotte FC on an initial contract until the end of the 2024 season. His new head coach Dean Smith had previously managed Paterson for a three-season spell at Walsall. Charlotte declined his contract option following their 2024 season.

=== Coventry City ===
On 14 February 2025, Paterson joined hometown club Coventry City on a short-term contract until the end of the season, making his debut for the Midlands club on 22 February at home to Preston North End as a second-half substitute. He scored his first goal for Coventry against Portsmouth, netting a 94th minute winner in a 1-0 victory on April 9th.

=== Plymouth Argyle ===
On 23 May 2025, newly relegated League One side Plymouth Argyle announced the signing of Paterson on the expiration of his contract with Coventry. He was released at the end of the 2025–26 season upon the expiry of his contract.

=== Rochdale ===
On 23 October 2026, Paterson joined League Two club Rochdale on a short-term deal until the end of the season.

== International career ==
Although born in England, Paterson has declared he would be open to play for Scotland, for whom he qualifies through his parents. He is also eligible to represent Wales through his grandfather, who was born in Neath.

== Career statistics ==
As of 5 April 2026

Appearances and goals by club, season and competition
Club	Season	League			FA Cup		League Cup		Other		Total	
Club	Season	Division	Apps	Goals	Apps	Goals	Apps	Goals	Apps	Goals	Apps	Goals
Walsall	2010–11	League One	14	0	0	0	0	0	1 (Note: Appearance(s) in Football League Trophy)	0	15	0
Walsall	2011–12	League One	34	3	2	0	0	0	0	0	36	3
Walsall	2012–13	League One	46	12	2	1	2	0	1	0	51	13
Walsall	Total		94	15	4	1	2	0	2	0	102	16
Nottingham Forest	2013–14	Championship	32	8	4	4	3	0	—		39	12
Nottingham Forest	2014–15	Championship	21	1	1	0	3	0	—		25	1
Nottingham Forest	2015–16	Championship	1	0	0	0	1	0	—		2	0
Nottingham Forest	2016–17	Championship	1	0	0	0	2	1	—		3	1
Nottingham Forest	Total		55	9	5	4	9	1	—		69	14
Huddersfield Town (loan)	2015–16	Championship	34	6	2	2	0	0	—		36	8
Bristol City	2016–17	Championship	22	4	2	1	0	0	—		24	5
Bristol City	2017–18	Championship	41	5	0	0	5	1	—		46	6
Bristol City	2018–19	Championship	41	5	2	0	0	0	—		43	5
Bristol City	2019–20	Championship	21	6	1	0	0	0	—		22	6
Bristol City	2020–21	Championship	20	3	1	0	1	1	—		22	4
Bristol City	Total		145	23	6	1	6	2	—		157	26
Derby County (loan)	2019–20	Championship	10	1	0	0	2	0	—		12	1
Swansea City	2021–22	Championship	38	9	0	0	0	0	0	0	38	9
Swansea City	2022–23	Championship	23	0	0	0	0	0	—		23	0
Swansea City	2023–24	Championship	44	7	1	0	2	1	—		47	8
Swansea City	Total		105	16	1	0	2	1	—		108	17
Charlotte FC	2024	Major League Soccer	4	0	—		—		0	0	4	0
Crown Legacy FC	2024	MLS Next Pro	4	0	—		—		0	0	4	0
Coventry City	2024–25	Championship	8	1	—		—		0	0	8	1
Plymouth Argyle	2025–26	League One	21	0	1	0	1	0	4	0	27	0
Career total			480	71	19	8	22	4	6	0	527	83
