= Jim Patterson (cricketer) =

Irish cricketer

Personal information
- Full name: Thomas James Taylor Patterson
- Born: 26 December 1959 (age 66); Downpatrick, Northern Ireland
- Batting: Left-handed
- Bowling: Left-arm medium

Domestic team information
- Years: Team
- 1984–1992: Ireland

Career statistics
Competition	First-class	List A
Matches	4	3
Runs scored	211	5
Batting average	42.20	2.50
100s/50s	0/2	0/0
Top score	84	5
Balls bowled	216	90
Wickets	3	0
Bowling average	32.00	–
5 wickets in innings	0	0
10 wickets in match	0	–
Best bowling	2/54	–
Catches/stumpings	3/–	3/–
- Source: Cricinfo, 27 October 2018

Thomas James "Jim" Taylor Patterson (born 25 December 1959) also known as "Big Jim Patterson" is a former Irish first-class cricketer.

Patterson was born at Downpatrick and was educated at Down High School. Playing his club cricket for Downpatrick, Patterson made his debut for Ireland in a List A one-day match against Surrey at The Oval in the 1984 NatWest Trophy. Later that season, he made his debut in first-class cricket when Ireland played Scotland at Glasgow. He played a further List A match against Sussex at Hove in the 1985 NatWest Trophy. He toured Zimbabwe in early 1986, playing seven minor matches on the tour. Appearing for Ireland in minor matches between 1986–1987, his next major appearance came in the August 1990 first-class fixture against Scotland. He played his final List A match in the 1991 NatWest Trophy against Middlesex, before two further first-class matches against Scotland, in 1991 at Malahide, and 1992 at Dundee. Patterson played a total of four first-class matches, scoring 211 runs at an average of 42.20, with a high score of 84. One of two half centuries he made, this score came against Scotland in 1990. He continued to play club cricket into the late 1990s, leaving Downpatrick on acrimonious terms in 1998. He then joined North of Ireland Cricket Club, playing for them in 1999.

Outside cricket, Patterson works as a financial advisor.
