= George Bowerman =

English footballer

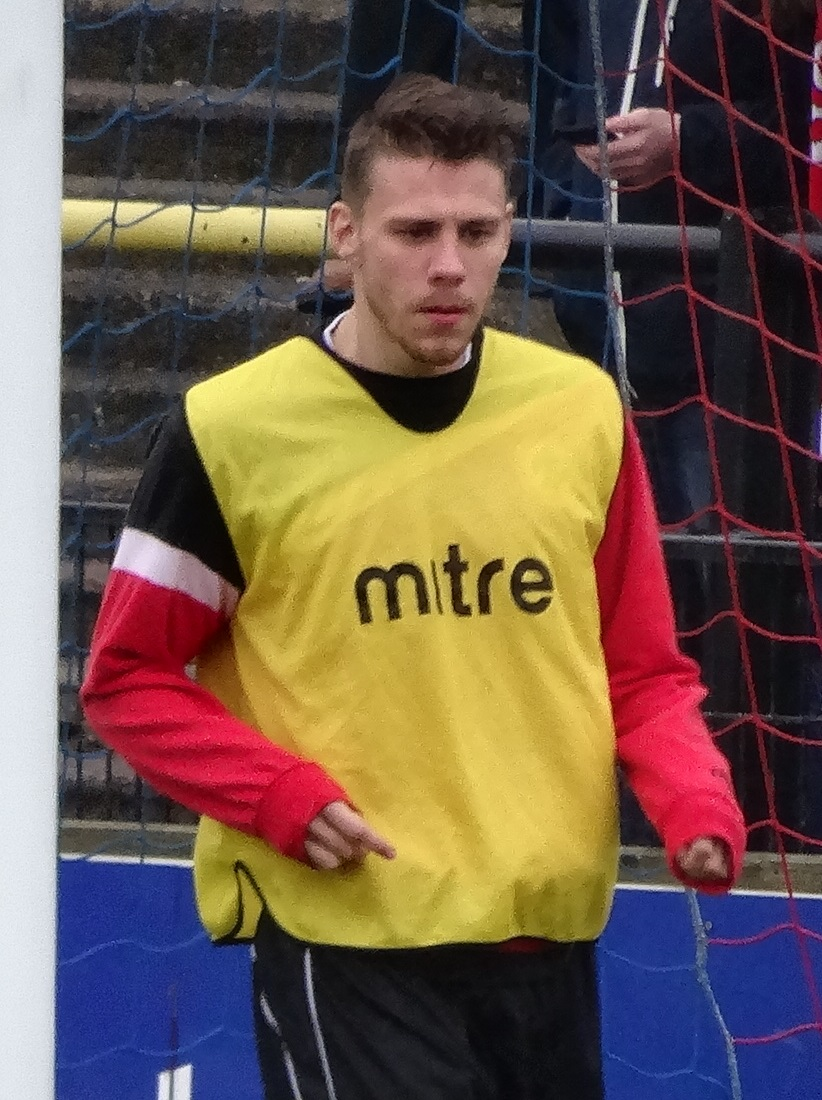
- Bowerman training with Accrington Stanley in 2014

Personal information
- Full name: George Oliver Bowerman
- Date of birth: 6 November 1991 (age 35)
- Place of birth: Sedgley, West Midlands, England
- Height: 1.78 m (5 ft 10 in)
- Position: Forward

Team information
- Current team: Cradley Town

Youth career
- 2005–2010: Walsall

Senior career*
Years	Team	Apps	(Gls)
2010–2013	Walsall	50	(9)
2011	→ Redditch United (loan)	6	(0)
2013	Woking	2	(0)
2013–2015	Accrington Stanley	17	(3)
2014	→ Stourbridge (loan)	9	(3)
2015–2016	Altrincham	26	(5)
2016	→ AFC Telford United (loan)		
2016	Stafford Rangers		
2016–2017	Halesowen Town		
2017	Rushall Olympic		
2017	Hinckley AFC		
2017–2018	Market Drayton Town		
2018–2019	Quorn		
2019–	Cradley Town	0	
- * Club domestic league appearances and goals as of 20:00, 26 July 2017 (UTC)

George Oliver Bowerman (born 6 November 1991) is an English professional footballer who plays as a forward for Cradley Town.

He began his career with Walsall, and had spent brief periods with non-League clubs Redditch United and Woking before joining Accrington Stanley in October 2013.

== Career ==
=== Walsall ===
Bowerman was born in Sedgley, West Midlands, and came through the Walsall youth academy to sign professional forms with the club in summer 2010. In February 2011, he joined Conference North club Redditch United on loan to gain first team experience. Despite not featuring for the Saddlers in 2010–11, he was given a new six-month contract at the end of the season.

He made his Walsall debut at the Bescot Stadium on 9 August 2011, replacing Ryan Jarvis 81 minutes into a 3–0 defeat to Middlesbrough in the League Cup. He scored his first professional goal after coming on as a substitute in a 4–2 home defeat to Bury on 19 November. Bowerman began 2012–13 with six goals from eleven games, but scored only once more in the remainder of the season, and was released.

=== Accrington Stanley ===
After playing twice for Woking in the Conference, Bowerman joined League Two club Accrington Stanley in October 2013 until the end of the season.

=== Non League ===
After leaving Accrington, Bowerman dropped back into the Conference signing for Altrincham in August 2015. Then after a season he moved into the Southern League with Stafford Rangers, then 4 months later joined Halesowen Town, before finishing the season at Rushall Olympic.

In October 2017, Bowerman joined Market Drayton Town. After a spell with Quorn, Bowerman joined Cradley Town on 12 November 2019.

== Coaching career ==
In summer 2018, Bowerman was hired as U11 manager at his former club Walsall.

== Career statistics ==
As of match played 16 November 2013

Club	Season	League			FA Cup		League Cup		Other		Total	
Club	Season	Division	Apps	Goals	Apps	Goals	Apps	Goals	Apps	Goals	Apps	Goals
Walsall	2010–11	League One	0	0	0	0	0	0	0	0	0	0
Walsall	2011–12	League One	22	3	3	1	1	0	0	0	26	4
Walsall	2012–13	League One	28	6	2	1	2	0	1 (Note: Appearance(s) in Football League Trophy)	0	33	7
Walsall	Total		50	9	5	2	3	0	1	0	59	11
Redditch United (loan)	2010–11	Conference North	6	0	0	0	0	0	0	0	6	0
Woking	2013–14	Conference Premier	2	0	0	0	0	0	0	0	2	0
Accrington Stanley	2013–14	League Two	3	1	1	0	0	0	0	0	4	1
Career totals			61	10	6	2	3	0	1	0	71	12
