= Jake Jones (footballer) =

English footballer (born 1993)

Personal information
- Full name: Jake Ben Jones
- Date of birth: 6 April 1993 (age 33)
- Place of birth: Solihull, England
- Position: Midfielder

Youth career
- 2009–2011: Walsall

Senior career*
Years	Team	Apps	(Gls)
2011–2013	Walsall	3	(0)
2011–2012	→ Redditch United (loan)		
2013	→ Lincoln City (loan)	13	(0)
2013–2014	Tamworth	5	(1)
2014–2015	→ King's Lynn Town (loan)	14	(3)
2014–2015	King's Lynn Town	32	(5)
2015	Halesowen Town	5	(1)
2015	King's Lynn Town	7	(1)
2015–2016	Leamington	5	(0)
2016	Stafford Rangers		
2016	Corby Town	1	(0)
2017–2018	Redditch United		
2018	Hinckley A.F.C.	0	(0)
- * Club domestic league appearances and goals as of 13:00, 8 March 2021 (UTC)

Jake Ben Jones (born 6 April 1993) is an English professional footballer, who most recently played for Midland League Division One side Hinckley A.F.C., where he played as a midfielder.

== Playing career ==
=== Walsall ===
Born in Solihull, Jones signed his first professional contract in the summer of 2011 after progressing through the youth system. In November 2011, he joined Southern Football League side Redditch United on an initial one-month loan, which was later extended until February. In June 2012, Jones signed a new six-month contract extension.

His debut for the Saddlers came on 11 August 2012, in a 1–0 win over Brentford in the Football League Cup, replacing Nicky Featherstone as a substitute. Jones signed on loan for Lincoln City in the Blue Square Bet Premier until the end of the 2012 /2013 season. He subsequently agreed a permanent contract with The Imps following his release from Walsall stating that the move was a 'no brainer' but then changed his mind at the last minute.

=== Tamworth ===
Jones signed for Tamworth, and the deal was confirmed on 13 May 2013. Jake joined King's Lynn Town on loan in September 2014.

=== King's Lynn Town ===
Following a successful loan spell from Tamworth, Jones decided to cancel his contract with The Lambs in search for regular first team football and personal reasons. He signed for The Linnets in January 2014 after a phone call with Gary Mills and Robert Duffy. Despite finding the net 8 times in 27 appearances in all competitions, Jones was also sent off three times in the final three months of the season. Jake remained with King's Lynn for the start of the 2014–15 season, making a further 32 appearances in all competitions and scoring three times. In January 2015, fellow Northern Premier League side Halesowen Town put in a 7-day approach for Jones. Following talks he opted to join the Yeltz, a club closer to his Midlands home.

=== Halesowen Town ===
Jones made a positive start to his time at Halesowen, coming on as a substitute to score the winner in a 2–1 away victory at Stamford in February 2015. He made two further starts for The Yeltz, but was unable to add to his goal tally. By mid-March, he had left the club. On Monday 23 March 2015, King's Lynn Town announced on Twitter that Jones had re-joined the club for a third spell.

=== Leamington ===
On 12 June 2015, he agreed to join Leamington for the 2015–16 season.

=== Hinckley A.F.C. ===
Jones signed for Midland League Division One side Hinckley A.F.C. on 1 July 2018. Jake played in one friendly match on 21 July 2018, setting up a goal for Sam Belcher, in a game with Hinckley lost 4–2 away to Gresley.
