= 2008–09 Walsall F.C. season =

Walsall F.C.
2008-09 season
- Manager: Jimmy Mullen Until 10 January 2009 Chris Hutchings From 20 January 2009
- Football League One: 13th
- FA Cup: First Round
- League Cup: First Round
- Football League Trophy: Southern Quarter Final

This article documents the 2008–09 season of football club Walsall F.C.

== League table ==
Pos	Team	Pld	W	D	L	GF	GA	GD	Pts
11	Bristol Rovers	46	17	12	17	79	61	+18	63
12	Colchester United	46	18	9	19	58	58	0	63
13	Walsall	46	17	10	19	61	66	−5	61
14	Leyton Orient	46	15	11	20	45	57	−12	56
15	Swindon Town	46	12	17	17	68	71	−3	53

Updated to match(es) played on 2 May 2009. Source: The Football League
Rules for classification: 1) points; 2) goal difference; 3) number of goals scored.

== Results ==
=== League Two ===
9 August 2008 1	Yeovil Town	1–1	Walsall	Yeovil
	Tomlin 10'		Ibehre 77'	Stadium: Huish Park; Attendance: 4,518

16 August 2008 2	Walsall	2–1	Scunthorpe United	Walsall
	Reich 12'; Ibehre 89'		Thompson 2'	Stadium: Banks's Stadium; Attendance: 4,162

23 August 2008 3	Crewe Alexandra	2–1	Walsall	Crewe
	Elding 21'; Grant 45'		Hughes 59'	Stadium: Gresty Road; Attendance: 4,160

30 August 2008 4	Walsall	5–2	Southend United	Walsall
	Reich 23'; Grant 48' (o.g.); Demontagnac 50', 69', 84'		Robson-Kanu 33'; Barnard 87'	Stadium: Banks's Stadium; Attendance: 3,843

6 September 2008 5	Walsall	0–2	Leyton Orient	Walsall
			Terry 73'; Boyd 80' (pen.)	Stadium: Banks's Stadium; Attendance: 4,838

13 September 2008 6	Bristol Rovers	1–3	Walsall	Bristol
	Elliott 76'		Ricketts 10', 90' (pen.); Roberts 24'	Stadium: Memorial Stadium; Attendance: 6,609

20 September 2008 7	Brighton & Hove Albion	0–1	Walsall	Brighton
			Mattis 44'	Stadium: Withdean Stadium; Attendance: 5,679

27 September 2008 8	Walsall	2–1	Carlisle United	Walsall
	Mattis 45'; Ibehre 64'		Bridge-Wilkinson 83' (pen.)	Stadium: Banks's Stadium; Attendance: 4,830

4 October 2008 9	Hereford United	0–0	Walsall	Hereford
				Stadium: Edgar Street; Attendance: 3,900

11 October 2008 10	Walsall	1–2	Peterborough United	Walsall
	Deeney 90'		Batt 2'; Whelpdale 43'	Stadium: Banks's Stadium; Attendance: 4,792

18 October 2008 11	Walsall	2–3	Hartlepool United	Walsall
	Ricketts 5'; Ibehre 13'		Sweeney 72'; Robson 76'; Brown 83'	Stadium: Banks's Stadium; Attendance: 4,142

21 October 2008 12	Leicester City	2–2	Walsall	Leicester
	King 34'; Tunchev 73'		Nicholls 11'; Ricketts 47'	Stadium: Walkers Stadium; Attendance: 17,178

25 October 2008 13	Leeds United	3–0	Walsall	Leeds
	Becchio 46'; Delph 65', 86'			Stadium: Elland Road; Attendance: 26,422

1 November 2008 14	Walsall	3–1	Northampton Town	Walsall
	Palmer 17'; Gerrard 22'; Deeney 63'		Constantine 70'	Stadium: Banks's Stadium; Attendance: 4,377

15 November 2008 15	Colchester United	0–2	Walsall	Colchester
			Mattis 16'; Ricketts 62'	Stadium: Weston Homes Community Stadium; Attendance: 4,071

22 November 2008 16	Walsall	0–3	Milton Keynes Dons	Walsall
			Johnson 6'; Gerba 59'; Wright 87'	Stadium: Banks's Stadium; Attendance: 5,026

25 November 2008 17	Oldham Athletic	3–2	Walsall	Oldham
	Allott 15'; Hughes 38', 89'		Ricketts 23'; Nicholls 25'	Stadium: Boundary Park; Attendance: 3,936

29 November 2008 18	Walsall	2–1	Swindon Town	Walsall
	Ricketts 17'; Nicholls 90'		Paynter 90'	Stadium: Banks's Stadium; Attendance: 3,844

6 December 2008 19	Huddersfield Town	2–1	Walsall	Huddersfield
	Roberts 26' (pen.); Collins 90'		Nicholls 49'	Stadium: Galpharm Stadium; Attendance: 11,827

13 December 2008 20	Walsall	1–2	Millwall	Walsall
	Nicholls 28'		Harris 16'; Frampton 89'	Stadium: Banks's Stadium; Attendance: 3,790

20 December 2008 21	Cheltenham Town	0–0	Walsall	Cheltenham
				Stadium: Whaddon Road; Attendance: 3,656

26 December 2008 22	Walsall	1–0	Stockport County	Walsall
	Weston 64'			Stadium: Banks's Stadium; Attendance: 5,496

28 December 2008 23	Tranmere Rovers	2–1	Walsall	Birkenhead
	Goodison 42'; Kay 90'		Reich 54' (pen.)	Stadium: Prenton Park; Attendance: 5,913

17 January 2009 24	Peterborough United	1–0	Walsall	Peterborough
	Whelpdale 6'			Stadium: London Road; Attendance: 5,705

24 January 2009 25	Walsall	1–1	Hereford United	Walsall
	Deeney 33'		Guinan 59' (pen.)	Stadium: Banks's Stadium; Attendance: 4,438

27 January 2009 26	Swindon Town	3–2	Walsall	Swindon
	Amankwaah 8'; Cox 29'; Paynter 49'		Ibehre 75'; Deeney 77'	Stadium: County Ground; Attendance: 6,100

31 January 2009 27	Walsall	1–0	Leeds United	Walsall
	Deeney 7'			Stadium: Banks's Stadium; Attendance: 8,920

3 February 2009 28	Walsall	1–4	Leicester City	Walsall
	Mattis 64'		Fryatt 12'; King 34'; Cleverley 47'; Howard 52'	Stadium: Banks's Stadium; Attendance: 5,634

7 February 2009 29	Hartlepool United	2–2	Walsall	Hartlepool
	Gerrard 36' (o.g.); Porter 64'		Deeney 10'; Williams 82'	Stadium: Victoria Park; Attendance: 3,286

10 February 2009 30	Carlisle United	1–1	Walsall	Carlisle
	Thirlwell 19'		Ricketts 84' (pen.)	Stadium: Brunton Park; Attendance: 4,502

14 February 2009 31	Walsall	2–0	Colchester United	Walsall
	Ricketts 17'; Deeney 42'			Stadium: Banks's Stadium; Attendance: 3,719

21 February 2009 32	Northampton Town	0–2	Walsall	Northampton
			Hughes 83'; Ibehre 90'	Stadium: Sixfields; Attendance: 4,528

28 February 2009 33	Walsall	2–0	Yeovil Town	Walsall
	Deeney 52'; Nicholls 76'			Stadium: Banks's Stadium; Attendance: 3,916

3 March 2009 34	Scunthorpe United	1–1	Walsall	Scunthorpe
	Odejayi 79'		Deeney 84'	Stadium: Glanford Park; Attendance: 3,423

7 March 2009 35	Southend United	2–0	Walsall	Southend
	Betsy 50'; Robinson 72'			Stadium: Roots Hall; Attendance: 6,973

10 March 2009 36	Walsall	1–1	Crewe Alexandra	Walsall
	Deeney 57'		Schumacher 90'	Stadium: Banks's Stadium; Attendance: 3,604

14 March 2009 37	Walsall	0–5	Bristol Rovers	Walsall
			Duffy 3', 58'; Disley 6'; Lescott 19', 78'	Stadium: Banks's Stadium; Attendance: 5,169

17 March 2009 38	Walsall	3–0	Brighton & Hove Albion	Walsall
	Bradley 14'; Deeney 30'; Gerrard 39'			Stadium: Banks's Stadium; Attendance: 3,549

21 March 2009 39	Leyton Orient	0–1	Walsall	London
			Bradley 45'	Stadium: Matchroom Stadium; Attendance: 3,969

28 March 2009 40	Walsall	1–1	Cheltenham Town	Walsall
	Townsend 67' (o.g.)		Artus 3'	Stadium: Banks's Stadium; Attendance: 4,101

4 April 2009 41	Millwall	3–1	Walsall	London
	Price 18'; Alexander 45', 54'		Ibehre 29'	Stadium: The Den; Attendance: 8,800

11 April 2009 42	Walsall	0–1	Tranmere Rovers	Walsall
			Savage 80'	Stadium: Banks's Stadium; Attendance: 4,206

13 April 2009 43	Stockport County	1–2	Walsall	Stockport
	Tansey 76'		Gerrard 11'; Logan 90' (o.g.)	Stadium: Edgeley Park; Attendance: 5,274

18 April 2009 44	Walsall	2–3	Huddersfield Town	Walsall
	Ibehre 14', 28'		Booth 43', 45'; Kelly 62'	Stadium: Banks's Stadium; Attendance: 3,951

25 April 2009 45	Milton Keynes Dons	0–1	Walsall	Milton Keynes
			Ibehre 61'	Stadium: Stadium MK; Attendance: 12,094

2 May 2009 46	Walsall	1–2	Huddersfield Town	Walsall
	Deeney 2'		Smalley 44'; Brooke 74'	Stadium: Banks's Stadium; Attendance: 4,807

=== FA Cup ===
8 November 2008 Round 1	Walsall	1–3	Scunthorpe United	Walsall
	Ricketts 24'		Hooper 42', 58'; Hurst 90'	Stadium: Banks's Stadium; Attendance: 2,318

=== League Cup ===
12 August 2008 Round 1	Walsall	1–2	Darlington	Walsall
	Ricketts 11'		Kennedy 31'; Clarke 67'	Stadium: Banks's Stadium; Attendance: 2,702

=== Football League Trophy ===
7 October 2008 Round 2	Cheltenham Town	1–2	Walsall	Cheltenham
	Low 4'		Ibehre 61'; Ricketts 74'	Stadium: Whaddon Road; Attendance: 1,741

4 November 2008 Southern Quarter Final	Walsall	0–1	Luton Town	Walsall
			Watson 90'	Stadium: Banks's Stadium; Attendance: 1,844

== Players ==
=== First-team squad ===
Includes all players who were awarded squad numbers during the season.

Note: Flags indicate national team as defined under FIFA eligibility rules; some limited exceptions apply. Players may hold more than one non-FIFA nationality.

No.	Pos.	Nation	Player
1	GK	TRI	Clayton Ince
2	DF	WAL	Rhys Weston
3	DF	ENG	Paul Boertien
4	DF	WAL	Stephen Roberts
5	DF	IRL	Anthony Gerrard
6	MF	ENG	Stephen Hughes
7	MF	ENG	Chris Palmer
8	MF	IRL	Dwayne Mattis
9	FW	ENG	Jabo Ibehre
10	FW	ENG	Michael Ricketts
11	MF	FRA	Sofiene Zaaboub
12	DF	WAL	Mark Bradley
13	GK	ENG	Tom Cox
14	DF	ENG	Richard Taundry

No.	Pos.	Nation	Player
17	FW	ENG	Alex Nicholls
19	FW	ENG	Troy Deeney
20	DF	ENG	Manny Smith
21	GK	IRL	Rene Gilmartin
23	MF	ENG	Richard Davies
24	FW	ENG	Will Grigg
25	MF	ENG	Charlton Davies
26	MF	ENG	Josh Craddock
27	DF	ENG	Netan Sansara
28	MF	ENG	Sam Adkins
29	DF	ENG	Darryl Westlake
30	DF	ENG	Hassan Bacchus
31	GK	ENG	James Belshaw

=== Left club during season ===
Note: Flags indicate national team as defined under FIFA eligibility rules; some limited exceptions apply. Players may hold more than one non-FIFA nationality.

No.	Pos.	Nation	Player
16	MF	ENG	Ishmel Demontagnac
15	GK	AUT	Albin Kajtezović
22	FW	GER	Marco Reich

No.	Pos.	Nation	Player
22	FW	ENG	Sam Williams (on loan from Aston Villa)
15	MF	NIR	Robin Shroot (on loan from Reading)
