= Sam Adkins =

Sam Adkins may refer to:

- Sam Adkins (American football) (born 1955), American football player
- Sam Adkins (footballer) (born 1991), football midfielder
- Sam Adkins (fighter) (born 1965), American mixed martial artist
