= 2009–10 Walsall F.C. season =

Walsall
2009–2010 season
- Manager: Jimmy Mullen (until 10 January 2010); Chris Hutchings (from 20 January 2010)
- Stadium: Bescot Stadium
- League One: 10th
- FA Cup: Second round
- League Cup: First round
- League Trophy: First round

The 2009–10 season was the 122nd season and their 3rd consecutive season in League One played by Walsall F.C., a football club based in Walsall, West Midlands, England. Along with competing in League One, the club also participated in the FA Cup, League Cup and the Football League Trophy.

== Season summary ==
Walsall finished 13th in the previous season, with caretaker manager Jimmy Mullen being appointed permanently shortly after the end of the season. However, on 10 January 2009 Mullen was sacked as manager following a run of just four wins in sixteen games. On 20 January 2009, Chris Hutchins was appointed as Mullen's successor with Martin O'Connor appointed as his assistant. Walsall finished 10th at the end of the season.

== Competitions ==
=== League One ===
==== Table ====
Pos	Team	Pld	W	D	L	GF	GA	GD	Pts
8	Colchester United	46	20	12	14	64	52	+12	72
9	Brentford	46	14	20	12	55	52	+3	62
10	Walsall	46	16	14	16	60	63	−3	62
11	Bristol Rovers	46	19	5	22	59	70	−11	62
12	Milton Keynes Dons	46	17	9	20	60	68	−8	60

Source: The Football League
Rules for classification: 1) points; 2) goal difference; 3) number of goals scored.

==== Results ====
League One match details
Date	Opponents	Venue	Result	Score F–A	Scorers	Attendance	Ref.
8 August 2009	Brighton & Hove Albion	A	W	1–0	Whing 30' o.g.	6,504	
15 August 2009	Southend United	H	D	2–2	Jones 11', Parkin 90+2' pen.	3,658	
18 August 2009	Leeds United	H	L	1–2	Parkin 79' pen.	8,483	
22 August 2009	Charlton Athletic	A	L	0–2		15,306	
29 August 2009	Gillingham	H	D	0–0		3,331	
5 September 2009	Norwich City	A	D	0–0		23,041	
12 September 2009	Tranmere Rovers	A	W	3–2	Byfield 45', Deeney 47', 83'	4,858	
19 September 2009	Swindon Town	H	D	1–1	Deeney 8'	4,148	
26 September 2009	Hartlepool United	A	L	0–3		3,334	
29 September 2009	Huddersfield Town	H	W	2–1	Byfield 66' pen., Mattis 87'	3,419	
3 October 2009	Carlisle United	H	D	2–2	Byfield 33', Jones 74'	3,572	
10 October 2009	Milton Keynes Dons	A	L	0–1		8,919	
17 October 2009	Exeter City	H	W	3–0	Jones 29', 45+2', Deeney 70'	4,063	
24 October 2009	Colchester United	A	L	1–2	Byfield 28'	4,880	
31 October 2009	Wycombe Wanderers	A	W	3–2	Jones 55', Hughes 80', Nicholls 83'	5,046	
14 November 2009	Stockport County	H	W	2–0	Richards 37', Byfield 56'	4,143	
21 November 2009	Brentford	A	D	1–1	Jones 68'	4,492	
24 November 2009	Oldham Athletic	H	W	3–0	Deeney 20', 80', Jones 45+1'	3,191	
1 December 2009	Yeovil Town	A	W	3–1	Byfield 5', Jones 20', Parkin 89'	3,508	
5 December 2009	Southampton	H	L	1–3	Byfield 66'	5,681	
12 December 2009	Millwall	A	L	1–2	Smith 8'	8,174	
19 December 2009	Leyton Orient	H	D	2–2	Deeney 46', 57'	3,616	
16 January 2010	Brighton & Hove Albion	H	L	1–2	Richards 26'	3,450	
26 January 2010	Norwich City	H	L	1–2	Deeney 35'	5,022	
30 January 2010	Gillingham	A	D	0–0		4,796	
2 February 2010	Charlton Athletic	H	D	1–1	Deeney 32'	3,417	
6 February 2010	Bristol Rovers	H	D	0–0		3,886	
9 February 2010	Bristol Rovers	A	W	1–0	Taundry 32'	5,919	
13 February 2010	Oldham Athletic	A	L	0–1		3,968	
16 February 2010	Leeds United	A	W	2–1	Mattis 46', McDonald 81'	18,941	
20 February 2010	Brentford	H	W	2–1	Nicholls 35', Deeney 84'	3,616	
23 February 2010	Yeovil Town	H	L	0–1		2,929	
27 February 2010	Southampton	A	L	1–5	Richards 3'	20,461	
6 March 2010	Millwall	H	D	2–2	Nicholls 12', Taundry 27'	3,835	
13 March 2010	Leyton Orient	A	L	0–2		3,685	
20 March 2010	Colchester United	H	W	1–0	Byfield 90+4'	3,510	
23 March 2010	Southend United	A	L	0–3		6,432	
27 March 2010	Exeter City	A	L	1–2	Gray 62'	5,887	
3 April 2010	Stockport County	A	D	1–1	Gray 47'	3,580	
5 April 2010	Wycombe Wanderers	H	W	2–1	Smith 7', Gray 22'	3,618	
10 April 2010	Tranmere Rovers	H	W	2–1	Smith 35', Byfield 70'	3,841	
13 April 2010	Huddersfield Town	A	L	3–4	Deeney 63', 69', Nicholls 83'	14,396	
17 April 2010	Swindon Town	A	D	1–1	Jones 44'	8,467	
24 April 2010	Hartlepool United	H	W	3–1	Gray 7', Deeney 29', Taundry 76'	3,457	
1 May 2010	Carlisle United	A	D	1–1	Byfield 2'	5,114	
8 May 2010	Milton Keynes Dons	H	W	2–1	Richards 47', Smith 86'	4,772	

=== FA Cup ===
FA Cup match details
Round	Date	Opponents	Venue	Result	Score F–A	Scorers	Attendance	Ref.
First round	7 November 2009	Stourbridge	A	W	1–0	Jones 34'	2,014	
Second round	28 November 2009	Brentford	A	L	0–1		2,611	

=== Football League Cup ===
Football League Cup match details
Round	Date	Opponents	Venue	Result	Score F–A	Scorers	Attendance	Ref.
First round	11 August 2009	Accrington Stanley	A	L	1–2	Nicholls 9'	1,041	

=== Football League Trophy ===
Football League Trophy match details
Round	Date	Opponents	Venue	Result	Score F–A	Scorers	Attendance	Ref.
First round	1 September 2009	Bury	H	D	0–0 (a.e.t.) (4–5 p)		2,314	

== Squad ==
No.	Name	Nat	Date of birth	Place of Birth	Signed from	Note
Goalkeepers
1	Clayton Ince	TRI	12 July 1972	Arima	Coventry City	
21	Rene Gilmartin	IRE	31 May 1987	Dublin	none	
26	Tim Cooney	ENG	6 April 1992	Birmingham	none	
31	Mark Oxley	ENG	28 September 1990	Sheffield	Hull City	on loan from Hull City
Defenders
2	Rhys Weston	WAL	27 October 1980	Kingston upon Thames	Port Vale	
3	Netan Sansara	ENG	3 August 1989	Darlaston	none	
5	Mark Hughes	ENG	9 December 1986	Kirkby	Northampton Town	
6	Manny Smith	ENG	8 November 1988	Birmingham	none	
14	Richard Taundry	ENG	15 February 1989	Walsall	none	
16	Darryl Westlake	ENG	1 March 1991	Sutton Coldfield	none	
19	Jamie Vincent	ENG	18 June 1975	Wimbledon	Swindon Town	
28	Clayton McDonald	ENG	6 December 1988	Liverpool	Manchester City	
Midfielders
4	Stephen Roberts	WAL	24 February 1980	Wrexham	Doncaster Rovers	retired in October 2009
8	Dwayne Mattis	IRL	31 July 1981	Huddersfield	Barnsley	
12	Mark Bradley	WAL	14 January 1988	Wordsley	none	
15	Josh O'Keefe	IRL	22 December 1988	Whalley	Blackburn Rovers	
17	Richard Davies	ENG	15 May 1990	Willenhall	none	
18	Peter Till	ENG	7 September 1985	Walsall	Grimsby Town	
20	Matt Richards	ENG	26 December 1984	Harlow	Ipswich Town	
23	Sam Adkins	ENG	3 December 1991	Birmingham	none	
24	Julian Gray	ENG	21 September 1979	Lewisham	Barnsley	signed in February 2010
25	Sean Geddes	ENG	13 February 1992	Sandwell	none	
Forwards
7	Steve Jones	NIR	25 October 1976	Derry	Burnley	
9	Sam Parkin	SCO	14 March 1981	Roehampton	Luton Town	
10	Troy Deeney	ENG	29 June 1988	Birmingham	none	
11	Alex Nicholls	ENG	9 December 1987	Stourbridge	none	
22	Will Grigg	NIR	3 July 1991	Solihull	Stratford Town	
27	Darren Byfield	JAM	29 September 1976	Sutton Coldfield	Oldham Athletic	
