= 2007–08 Walsall F.C. season =

Walsall
2007–08 season
- Manager: Richard Money Until 22 April 2008 Jimmy Mullen From 22 April 2008
- Stadium: Banks's Stadium
- League One: 12th
- FA Cup: Third round
- Football League Cup: First round
- Johnstones Paint Trophy: Southern first round

This page shows the progress of Walsall F.C. in the 2007–08 football season. During the season, Walsall competed in League One in the English league system.

== League table ==
Pos	Team	Pld	W	D	L	GF	GA	GD	Pts
10	Huddersfield Town	46	20	6	20	50	62	−12	66
11	Tranmere Rovers	46	18	11	17	52	47	+5	65
12	Walsall	46	16	16	14	52	46	+6	64
13	Swindon Town	46	16	13	17	63	56	+7	61
14	Leyton Orient	46	16	12	18	49	63	−14	60

Updated to match(es) played on unknown. Source: The Football League
Rules for classification: 1) points; 2) goal difference; 3) number of goals scored.

== Results ==
=== Football League One ===
11 August 2007 1	Walsall	1–1	Carlisle United	Walsall
	Mooney 47'		Gall 69'	Stadium: Banks's Stadium; Attendance: 6,933

18 August 2007 2	Leyton Orient	1–0	Walsall	London
	Gray 52'			Stadium: Matchroom Stadium; Attendance: 4,524

25 August 2007 3	Walsall	1–3	Swansea City	Walsall
	Butler 7'; Roper (red card) 64'		Robinson 12', 66' (pen.); Scotland 26'	Stadium: Banks's Stadium; Attendance: 5,673

1 September 2007 4	Gillingham	2–1	Walsall	Gillingham
	Mulligan 15', 34'		Fox 20'	Stadium: Priestfield; Attendance: 4,806

8 September 2007 5	Walsall	0–0	Port Vale	Walsall
				Stadium: Banks's Stadium; Attendance: 4,967

15 September 2007 6	Millwall	1–2	Walsall	London
	Frampton 83'		Fox 42'; Deeney 86'	Stadium: The Den; Attendance: 7,720

22 September 2007 7	Walsall	0–3	Oldham Athletic	Walsall
			Ricketts 33'; Liddell 65' (pen.); Davies 90'	Stadium: Banks's Stadium; Attendance: 6,202

29 September 2007 8	Hartlepool United	0–1	Walsall	Hartlepool
			Hall 90'	Stadium: Victoria Park; Attendance: 4,948

2 October 2007 9	Doncaster Rovers	2–3	Walsall	Doncaster
	Mills 17'; Guy 40' (red card) 90'		Fox 28'; Bradley 66'; Mooney 71' (pen.)	Stadium: Keepmoat Stadium; Attendance: 6,038

6 October 2007 10	Walsall	4–0	Huddersfield Town	Walsall
	Gerrard 31'; Sonko 43'; Bradley 50'; Mooney 67'		Sinclair (red card) 54'	Stadium: Banks's Stadium; Attendance: 5,112

12 October 2007 11	Tranmere Rovers	0–0	Walsall	Birkenhead
				Stadium: Prenton Park; Attendance: 7,697

20 October 2007 12	Walsall	0–2	Southend United	Walsall
			P.Clarke 38'; L. Clarke 54'	Stadium: Banks's Stadium; Attendance: 5,661

27 October 2007 13	Bournemouth	1–1	Walsall	Bournemouth
	Kuffour 20'		Wrack 81'	Stadium: Fitness First Stadium; Attendance: 5,414

3 November 2007 14	Walsall	2–0	Cheltenham Town	Walsall
	Mooney 10' (pen.), 56'			Stadium: Banks's Stadium; Attendance: 4,810

6 November 2007 15	Brighton & Hove Albion	1–1	Walsall	Brighton
	Robinson 36'		Demontagnac 78'	Stadium: Withdean Stadium; Attendance: 4,717

17 November 2007 16	Walsall	0–0	Luton Town	Walsall
				Stadium: Banks's Stadium; Attendance: 5,056

24 November 2007 17	Northampton Town	0–2	Walsall	Northampton
			Bradley 45'; Demontagnac 78'	Stadium: Sixfields; Attendance: 5,767

4 December 2007 18	Walsall	1–0	Nottingham Forest	Walsall
	Ricketts 48'			Stadium: Banks's Stadium; Attendance: 6,605

8 December 2007 19	Crewe Alexandra	0–0	Walsall	Crewe
				Stadium: Gresty Road; Attendance: 4,639

15 December 2007 20	Walsall	1–1	Leeds United	Walsall
	Mooney 76'		Thompson 90'	Stadium: Banks's Stadium; Attendance: 10,102

22 December 2007 21	Walsall	3–0	Millwall	Walsall
	Mooney 29', 38'; Harris 45' (o.g.)			Stadium: Banks's Stadium; Attendance: 5,433

26 December 2007 22	Port Vale	1–1	Walsall	Stoke on Trent
	Laird 12'		Fox (red card) 68'; Ricketts 90'	Stadium: Vale Park; Attendance: 6,029

29 December 2007 23	Oldham Athletic	0–2	Walsall	Oldham
			Dann 2'; Ricketts 65'	Stadium: Boundary Park; Attendance: 5,292

1 January 2008 24	Walsall	1–1	Doncaster Rovers	Walsall
	Dann 75'		Price 45'	Stadium: Banks's Stadium; Attendance: 6,266

8 January 2008 25	Yeovil Town	0–2	Walsall	Yeovil
			Dann 59'; Nicholls 64'	Stadium: Huish Park; Attendance: 4,319

12 January 2008 26	Walsall	2–2	Swindon Town	Walsall
	Sonko 22', 68'		Nicholas 65'; Easton 67'	Stadium: Banks's Stadium; Attendance: 5,449

19 January 2008 27	Bristol Rovers	1–1	Walsall	Bristol
	Disley 87'		Sonko 37'	Stadium: Memorial Stadium; Attendance: 6,276

26 January 2008 28	Walsall	2–1	Gillingham	Walsall
	Mooney 28'; Sonko 72'		Crofts 90'	Stadium: Banks's Stadium; Attendance: 4,914

29 January 2008 29	Walsall	0–0	Leyton Orient	Walsall
				Stadium: Banks's Stadium; Attendance: 4,643

2 February 2008 30	Carlisle United	2–1	Walsall	Carlisle
	Bridge-Wilkinson 33' (pen.); Graham 75'		Holmes 23'	Stadium: Brunton Park; Attendance: 6,220

9 February 2008 31	Walsall	2–0	Yeovil Town	Walsall
	Holmes 67'; Betsy 90'			Stadium: Banks's Stadium; Attendance: 5,034

12 February 2008 32	Swansea City	1–0	Walsall	Swansea
	Bodde 53'			Stadium: Liberty Stadium; Attendance: 13,020

23 February 2008 33	Swindon Town	0–3	Walsall	Swindon
			Holmes 11', 57'; Nicholls 90'	Stadium: County Ground; Attendance: 6,265

1 March 2008 34	Luton Town	0–1	Walsall	Luton
			Moore 4'	Stadium: Kenilworth Road; Attendance: 6,157

8 March 2008 35	Walsall	0–2	Northampton Town	Walsall
			Akinfenwa 8', 71'	Stadium: Banks's Stadium; Attendance: 6,844

11 March 2008 36	Walsall	1–2	Brighton & Hove Albion	Walsall
	Gerrard 29'; Taundry (red card) 79'		Forster 34'; Gerrard 79' (o.g.)	Stadium: Banks's Stadium; Attendance: 4,309

15 March 2008 37	Nottingham Forest	1–1	Walsall	Nottingham
	Ormerod 49'		Wilson 54' (o.g.)	Stadium: City Ground; Attendance: 17,177

22 March 2008 38	Leeds United	2–0	Walsall	Leeds
	Beckford 29', 80'			Stadium: Elland Road; Attendance: 19,095

24 March 2008 39	Walsall	1–1	Crewe Alexandra	Walsall
	Roper 90'		Maynard 61'	Stadium: Banks's Stadium; Attendance: 4,741

29 March 2008 40	Southend United	1–0	Walsall	Southend-on-sea
	Barnard 47'			Stadium: Roots Hall; Attendance: 8,145

5 April 2008 41	Walsall	2–1	Tranmere Rovers	Walsall
	N'Dour 45'; Demontagnac 59'		Myrie-Williams 3'; Chorley (red card) 40'	Stadium: Banks's Stadium; Attendance: 5,745

12 April 2008 42	Cheltenham Town	1–2	Walsall	Cheltenham
	Connor 74'		Mooney 27' (pen.); Gerrard 28'	Stadium: Whaddon Road; Attendance: 4,861

15 April 2008 43	Walsall	0–1	Bristol Rovers	Walsall
			Lambert 34'	Stadium: Banks's Stadium; Attendance: 5,200

19 April 2008 44	Walsall	1–3	Bournemouth	Walsall
	Betsy 33'		Hollands 10'; Kuffour 35'; Pitman 63' (pen.)	Stadium: Banks's Stadium; Attendance: 4,530

26 April 2008 45	Huddersfield Town	2–0	Walsall	Huddersfield
	Schofield 41'; Booth 56'			Stadium: Galpharm Stadium; Attendance: 9,969

3 May 2008 46	Walsall	2–2	Hartlepool United	Walsall
	Dobson 9'; Mooney 15'		Mackay 19'; Clark 90'	Stadium: Banks's Stadium; Attendance: 5,021

=== FA Cup ===
10 November 2007 Round 1	Walsall	2–0	Shrewsbury Town	Walsall
	Ricketts 10'; Demontagnac 66'			Stadium: Banks's Stadium; Attendance: 4,972

1 December 2007 Round 2	Northampton Town	1–1	Walsall	Northampton
	Kirk 8'		Mooney 4'	Stadium: Sixfields; Attendance: 3,887

11 December 2007 Round 2 replay	Walsall	1–0	Northampton Town	Walsall
	Ricketts 85' (pen.)			Stadium: Banks's Stadium; Attendance: 3,066

5 January 2008 Round 3	Walsall	0–0	Millwall	Walsall
				Stadium: Banks's Stadium; Attendance: 4,358

15 January 2008 Round 3 replay	Millwall	2–1	Walsall	London
	May 10'; Alexander 49'		Nicholls 61'	Stadium: The Den; Attendance: 4,645

=== League Cup ===
14 August 2007 Round 1	Swansea City	2–0	Walsall	Swansea
	Anderson 22'; Scotland 90'			Stadium: Liberty Stadium; Attendance: 6,943

=== Football League Trophy ===
4 September 2007 Southern Section Round 1	Bournemouth	2–0	Walsall	Bournemouth
	Bradbury 3', 8'			Stadium: Fitness First Stadium; Attendance: 2,206

== Players ==
=== First-team squad ===
Includes all players who were awarded squad numbers during the season.

Note: Flags indicate national team as defined under FIFA eligibility rules; some limited exceptions apply. Players may hold more than one non-FIFA nationality.

No.	Pos.	Nation	Player
1	GK	TRI	Clayton Ince
2	DF	ENG	Rhys Weston
4	MF	SEN	Alassane N'Dour
5	DF	ENG	Anthony Gerrard
6	DF	ENG	Ian Roper
7	MF	ENG	Darren Wrack
8	DF	ENG	Michael Dobson
9	FW	ENG	Stefan Moore
10	FW	ENG	Tommy Mooney
12	MF	ENG	Ishmel Demontagnac
13	GK	FRA	Bertrand Bossu
15	DF	ENG	Aaron Brown (on loan from Reading)
16	MF	ENG	Lee Holmes (on loan from Derby County)

No.	Pos.	Nation	Player
17	FW	ENG	Alex Nicholls
18	DF	ENG	Mark Bradley
19	FW	ENG	Troy Deeney
20	DF	ENG	Manny Smith
21	FW	ENG	David McDermott
22	MF	GAM	Edrissa Sonko
23	DF	ENG	Paul Boertien
24	MF	ENG	Dean Shepherd
25	MF	ENG	Charlton Davies
26	DF	ENG	Richard Taundry
27	DF	ENG	Netan Sansara
28	MF	SEY	Kevin Betsy (on loan from Bristol City)
30	MF	ENG	Josh Craddock
31	GK	ENG	Rene Gilmartin

=== Left club during season ===
Note: Flags indicate national team as defined under FIFA eligibility rules; some limited exceptions apply. Players may hold more than one non-FIFA nationality.

No.	Pos.	Nation	Player
4	MF	ENG	Danny Sonner
29	MF	ENG	Dwayne Mattis (returned to parent club Barnsley following loan spell)
14	FW	POR	Carlos Carneiro (footballer)
16	DF	AUS	Allan Picken
16	MF	SCO	Peter Sweeney (returned to parent club Stoke City following loan spell)
9	FW	ENG	Martin Butler (joined Grimsby Town on 16 October 2007)

No.	Pos.	Nation	Player
11	MF	ENG	Paul Hall
24	FW	ANG	João Mawete
14	MF	ENG	Martin Brittain
3	DF	ENG	Danny Fox (joined Coventry City on 28 January 2008)
15	DF	ENG	Scott Dann (joined Coventry City on 31 January 2008)
29	FW	ENG	Michael Ricketts (returned to parent club Oldham Athletic following loan spell)
