= 2012 Football League Cup final =

- Match programme cover
- Event: 2011–12 Football League Cup
Cardiff City	Liverpool
(Wales)	(England)
2	2
- After extra time Liverpool won 3–2 on penalties
- Date: 26 February 2012
- Venue: Wembley Stadium, London
- Man of the Match: Stewart Downing (Liverpool)
- Referee: Mark Clattenburg (County Durham)
- Attendance: 89,041
- Weather: Partly cloudy 10 °C (50 °F)

The 2012 Football League Cup final was a football match between Cardiff City and Liverpool on 26 February 2012 at Wembley Stadium, London. It was the final match of the 2011–12 Football League Cup, the 52nd season of the Football League Cup, a football competition for the 92 teams in the Premier League and the Football League. Cardiff were appearing in their first final, while Liverpool were appearing in the final for the eleventh time; they had previously won seven and lost three finals.

As Cardiff were in the Football League, they played one more round than Liverpool who received a bye in the first round. Therefore, Cardiff progressed through six rounds to reach the final, whereas Liverpool progressed through five. Matches up to the semi-final were contested on a one-off basis with the exception of the semi-finals, which were contested over two-legs with a match at each team's home ground. Both Liverpool and Cardiff's matches were close affairs; their biggest margins of victory was by two goals. Liverpool beat Manchester City to reach the final, whereas Cardiff progressed via a penalty shoot-out against Crystal Palace.

Watched by a crowd of 89,041, Cardiff took the lead in the first half when Joe Mason scored. The score remained the same through half-time until Liverpool equalised in the 60th minute, when Martin Škrtel scored. With the score 1–1 at full-time, the match went to extra-time as neither side were able to score a second goal. The first half of extra-time was goalless, but three minutes into the second half Liverpool took the lead when Dirk Kuyt scored. However two minutes before the end of extra-time Cardiff equalised to make the score 2–2, courtesy of a goal from Ben Turner. With the score at 2–2 at the end of extra-time the match went to a penalty shoot-out. Despite missing their first two penalties, Liverpool won the shoot-out 3–2 to win the League Cup for a record eighth time.

Liverpool's manager Kenny Dalglish stated in the aftermath, that the victory would lead to more trophies, although Liverpool did not win another trophy until 2019. The club reached the 2012 FA Cup final, but were beaten 2–1 by Chelsea. Their league form faltered after the victory and they finished the season in 8th place. Despite this, victory in the final ensured Liverpool had qualified for the 2012–13 UEFA Europa League. Cardiff manager Malky Mackay was proud of his team despite their defeat. They finished the season in 6th place in the 2011–12 Football League Championship, reaching the playoffs where they were beaten by West Ham United over two-legs.

== Route to the final ==
=== Cardiff City ===
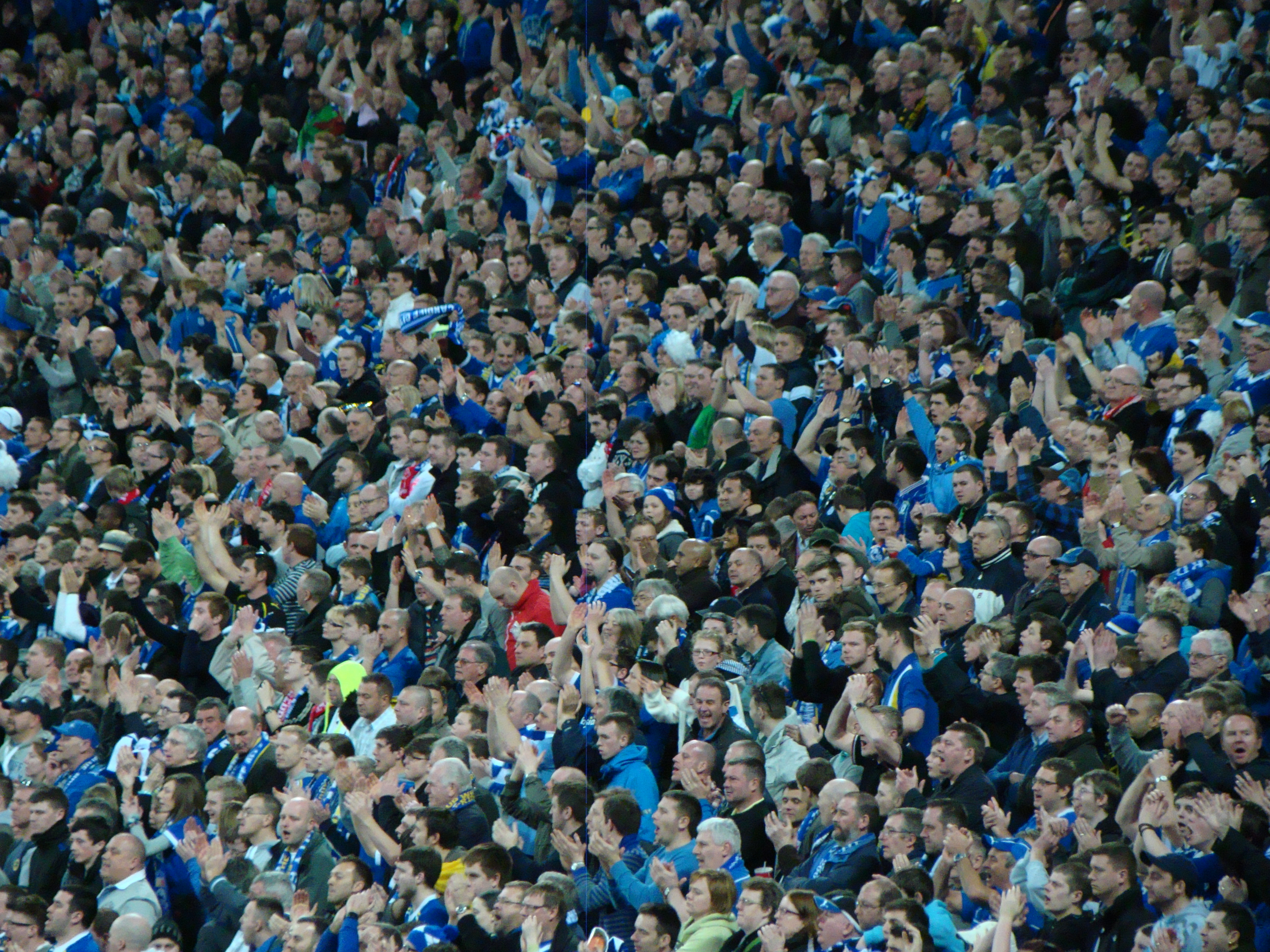
Cardiff City fans during the final

Round	Opponents	Score
1st	Oxford United (a)	3–1 (a.e.t.)
2nd	Huddersfield Town (h)	5–3 (a.e.t.)
3rd	Leicester City (h)	2–2 (7–6 pen)
4th	Burnley (h)	1–0
5th	Blackburn Rovers (h)	2–0
SF	Crystal Palace (a)	0–1
SF	Crystal Palace (h)	1–0 (3–1 pen)

Cardiff entered the 2011–12 Football League Cup in the first round where they faced Oxford United. The match played at the Kassam Stadium saw Cardiff take the lead in the 10th minute when Craig Conway scored. Oxford equalised 20 minutes later courtesy of a Simon Clist goal. Neither side was able to score a winning goal during the remainder of the match, which went into extra-time at 1–1. Two goals from Peter Whittingham and Nathaniel Jarvis secured a 3–1 victory for Cardiff. Their opponents in the second round were Huddersfield Town. Two goals in the first 16 minutes courtesy of Gabor Gyepes and Jon Parkin gave Cardiff an early 2–0 lead, which they held until the 55th minute when Huddersfield reduced the deficit to 2–1 courtesy of a Jordan Rhodes goal. Daniel Ward equalised for Huddersfield in the 69th minute before Rhodes scored his second goal of the match to give Huddersfield a 3–2 lead in the 87th minute. Cardiff equalised two minutes into stoppage time when Don Cowie headed the ball in from close range. With the score at 3–3 after 90 minutes the match went to extra-time. A goal each from Conway and Cowie gave Cardiff a 5–3 victory and progression to the third round.

Leicester City were the opponents in the third round. Cardiff playing at their home ground the Cardiff City Stadium took the lead in the 32nd minute when Cowie scored. Leicester equalised seven minutes later when Steve Howard scored from close range. Leicester then took the lead in the 65th minute courtesy of a Lloyd Dyer goal. Cardiff equalised when Rudy Gestede with nine minutes of the match remaining. The score remained 2–2 until full-time and throughout extra-time, which mean the match would be decided by a penalty shoot-out. Cardiff won the shoot-out 7–6 to progress to the fourth round.

Cardiff were drawn at home against Burnley in the fourth round. They won the match 1–0 courtesy of a Joe Mason goal in the first half. The result was the first time in the competition Cardiff's match did not go into extra-time and it was the first they had reached the quarter-finals of the League Cup since 1965. Their opponents in the quarter-finals were Blackburn Rovers. Two goals from Kenny Miller and Anthony Gerrard secured a 2–0 victory for Cardiff and their progression to the semi-finals.

Crystal Palace were Cardiff's opponents in the semi-final which was played over two-legs. The first leg was played at Palace's home ground Selhurst Park. Cardiff started the match the better of the two sides but were unable to convert their chances. Palace took the lead in the 43rd minute when Anthony Gardner headed in Darren Ambrose's cross. Neither side scored again and the match ended 1–0. The second leg at the Cardiff City Stadium started well for Cardiff when they went ahead in the seventh minute after an own-goal from Palace defender Gardner, which levelled the aggregate score at 1–1. Palace were reduced to ten men in the second half when Paddy McCarthy was sent-off. Despite their numerical advantage Cardiff were unable to a second goal during the 90 minutes and extra-time and the tie went to a penalty shoot-out. Cardiff goalkeeper Tom Heaton saved two penalties as Cardiff won the shoot-out 3–1 to progress to their first League Cup final.

=== Liverpool ===
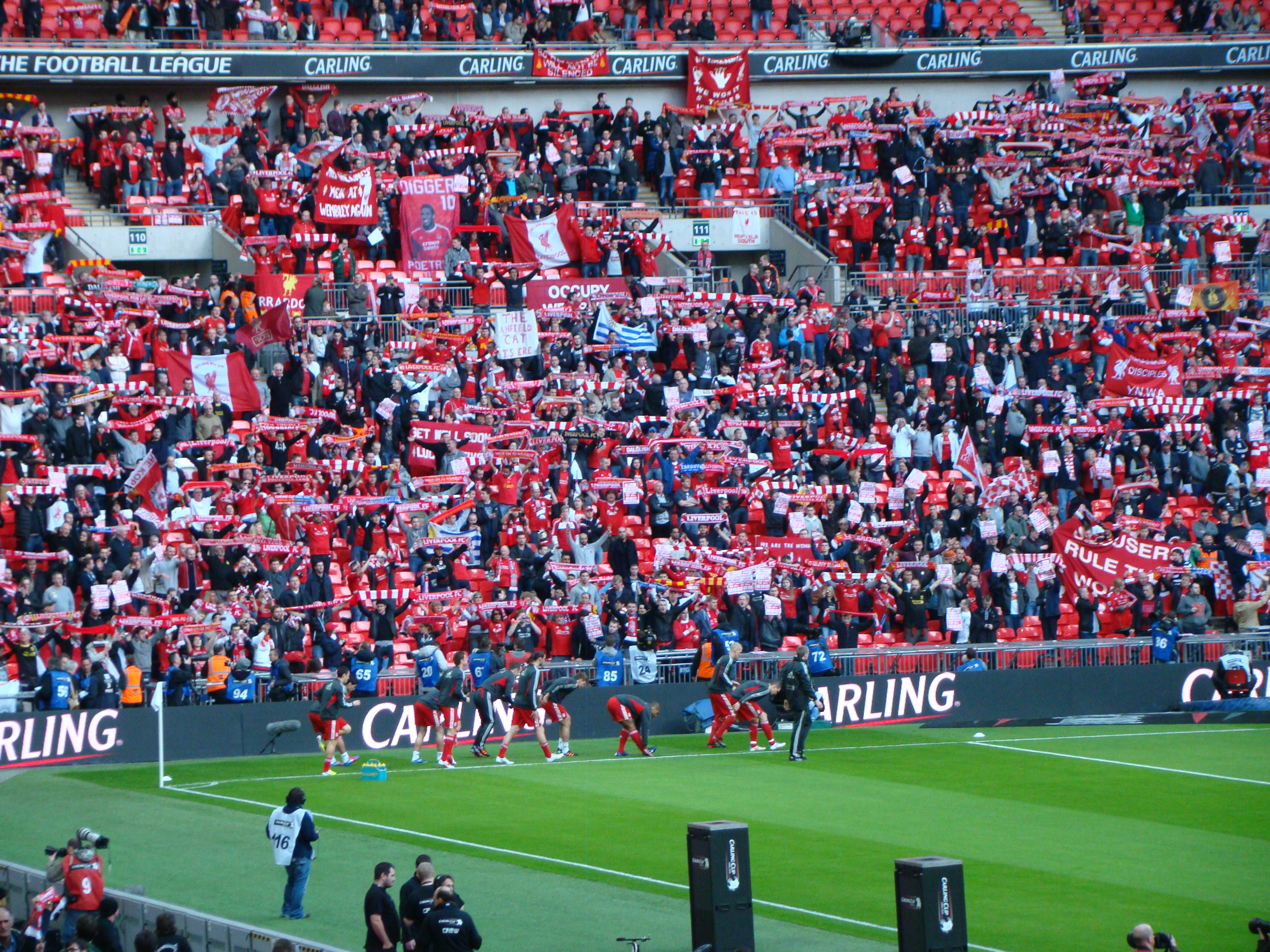
Liverpool fans during the final

Round	Opponents	Score
2nd	Exeter City (a)	3–1
3rd	Brighton & Hove Albion (a)	2–1
4th	Stoke City (a)	2–1
5th	Chelsea (a)	2–0
SF	Manchester City (a)	1–0
SF	Manchester City (h)	2–2

Liverpool entered the competition in the second round, as one of the thirteen teams from the Premier League who were not involved in European competition during the season. They were drawn against Exeter City in the second round. The match, played at Exeter's home ground, St James Park was won by Liverpool; goals from Luis Suárez, Maxi Rodríguez and Andy Carroll helped the team win 3–1.

Liverpool's opponents in the third round were Brighton & Hove Albion. The match was played at Brighton's home ground, the Falmer Stadium. Liverpool took the lead in the 7th minute when Craig Bellamy scored. Dirk Kuyt extended the lead in the second half, scoring in the 82nd minute. Brighton pulled a goal back courtesy of an Ashley Barnes penalty kick, but were unable to score an equaliser; the match finished 2–1 to Liverpool.

Stoke City were Liverpool's opponents in the fourth round. The match, held at Stoke's home ground the Britannia Stadium saw Stoke take the lead towards the end of the first-half when Kenwyne Jones scored. Liverpool equalised in the 54th minute courtesy of a goal from Suárez, and he scored the winner in the 84th minute to give Liverpool a 2–1 victory and a place in the fifth round. Liverpool were drawn against Chelsea in the subsequent round. At Stamford Bridge, Carroll missed a penalty in a goalless first half. Despite this Liverpool scored twice after the interval, courtesy of goals from Maxi and Martin Kelly. They won the match 2–0 to reach the semi-finals.

Liverpool were drawn against Manchester City in the semi-finals which were held over two-legs. The first leg was at City's home ground, the Etihad stadium. Liverpool won the match 1–0, courtesy of a Steven Gerrard penalty. The second leg was held at Liverpool's home ground Anfield. City took the lead in the first half when Nigel de Jong scored, ten minutes later Gerrard equalised when he scored a penalty. At half-time, the score was 1–1 with Liverpool leading 2–1 on aggregate. City took the lead in the match when Edin Džeko scored in the 67th minute. The goal meant the aggregate score was 2–2 but City would progress to the final if the score remained the same due to the away goals rule. Liverpool needed to find an equaliser, and seven minutes after Džeko's goal they did, when Bellamy scored. City tried to score an equaliser but to no avail, and the match finished 2–2, with Liverpool progressing to the final courtesy of a 3–2 aggregate victory.

== Match ==
=== Background ===
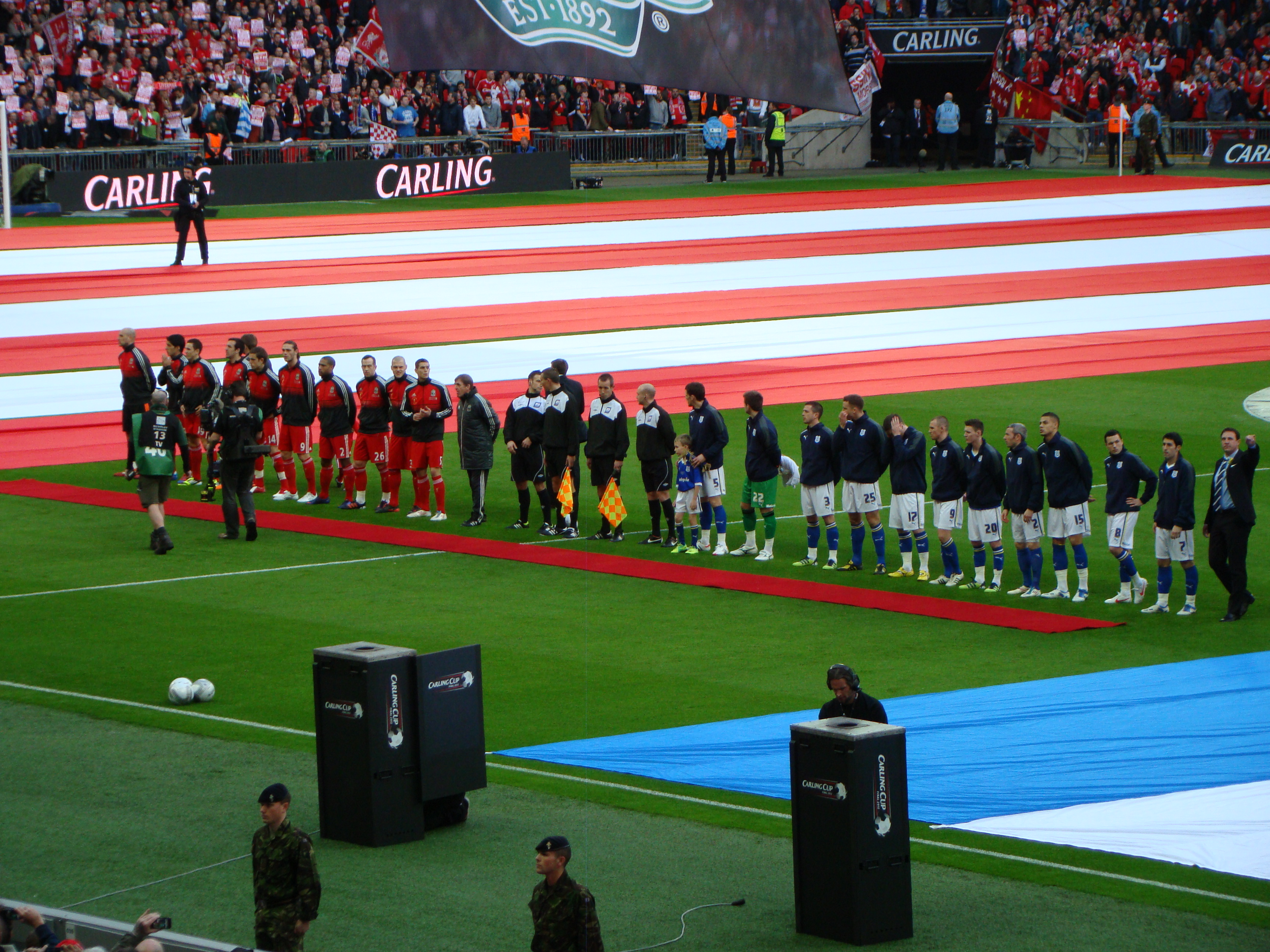
The Liverpool and Cardiff players lining up before the start of the match.

Cardiff were appearing in their first League Cup final; they had previously reached the semi-final of the competition in the 1965–66 season, when they were beaten by West Ham United 5–1 on aggregate. They were also the first team from outside the Premier League to reach the final since 2001, when Birmingham City lost to Liverpool. Liverpool were appearing in their eleventh final; they had won seven (1981, 1982, 1983, 1984, 1995, 2001, 2003) and lost three (1978, 1987, 2005). The last meeting between the two teams was in the 2007–08 Football League Cup on 31 October 2007, Liverpool won 2–1 to progress to the fifth round.

This was the fourth time in as many years that Cardiff City had played at Wembley Stadium. They played at the stadium twice during the 2007–08 FA Cup; they beat Barnsley 1–0 in the semi-final before losing 1–0 to Portsmouth in the final. Their last match at the stadium was the 2010 Championship play-off final against Blackpool, which they lost 3–2. The final represented the first time Liverpool had visited the new Wembley Stadium; their previous appearances in the final in 2001, 2003 and 2005 had been played at the Millennium Stadium in Cardiff while Wembley was being rebuilt. Their last visit to Wembley was in 1996 when they reached the final of the FA Cup, match they lost 1–0 to Manchester United at the old Wembley Stadium.

A week before the final Cardiff played Ipswich Town in the 2011–12 Football League Championship – it was their last match before the final, which they lost 3–0. Cardiff had a few injury concerns ahead of the final. Captain Mark Hudson had a calf problem, while midfielder Stephen McPhail had missed Cardiff's last four matches as he was suffering from Sjögren's syndrome, an immune system disorder. Goalkeeper Heaton was also a doubt with a knock on his ankle, but he was considered likely to start the match. Cardiff manager Malky Mackay acknowledged that Liverpool went into the match as favourites, but he was confident his team could provide a shock: "Obviously we are underdogs but we have a chance in the final, Maybe only a one in 10 chance but that's still a chance if you turn up motivated, fit and organised and I think I can promise that."

Liverpool's last match before the final was against Brighton & Hove Albion in the FA Cup, which they won 6–1. Despite the margin of victory, Liverpool manager Kenny Dalglish was adamant that the result meant nothing in regards to the final: "Defeating Brighton has got us to the next round, but it doesn't really help us in the Carling Cup, we've got a cup final but we won't get carried away." Despite missing the match against Brighton, Dalglish was confident that Daniel Agger and Craig Bellamy would be fit for the final. Going into the match Liverpool had not won a trophy since they beat West Ham United in the 2006 FA Cup final. Dalglish stated that victory: "means a lot to me, more importantly it means a lot to a lot of people who have had to endure a few years when we've not been [to Wembley]."

Both clubs received an allocation of approximately 31,000 tickets. Cardiff fans would be housed in the East End of the stadium, while Liverpool fans were allocated the West End of the stadium. Ticket prices were increased from last year's final, with the most expensive tickets costing £90, up £4 from the previous year. The least expensive tickets cost £40, which was £2 more than last year. It was decided that before the match started national anthems would not be played. This decision was made to avoid spectators jeering the anthems, as happened during the 2008 FA Cup final between Portsmouth and Cardiff.

=== First-half ===
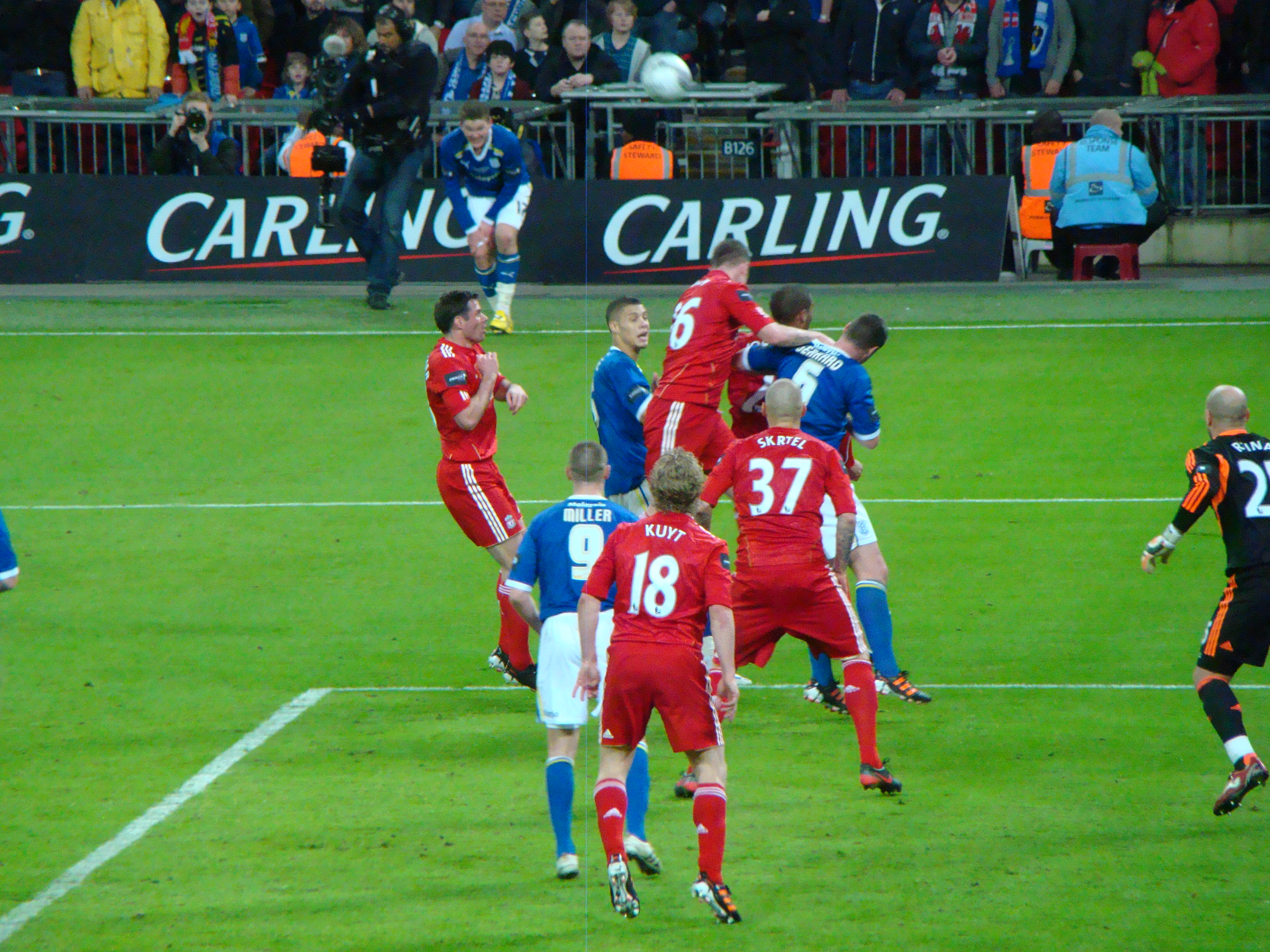
Cardiff and Liverpool players compete to win possession of the ball from a throw-in

Cardiff set up in a 4–4–1–1 formation with Rudy Gestede in the striker position supported by Kenny Miller. Liverpool lined up in a 4–2–3–1 formation, with Andy Carroll starting as the lone striker, with Luis Suárez playing behind him and Jordan Henderson and Stewart Downing either side. Cardiff kicked off, but Liverpool had the first chance of the match. Steven Gerrard passed the ball to Stewart Downing on the left hand side of the pitch, he passed to Glen Johnson whose shot hit the crossbar, the ball rebounded to Gerrard, but he sent his shot over the Cardiff goal. Liverpool had the best of the opening minutes of the match, with Cardiff unable to keep possession of the ball. Liverpool had another chance in the sixth minute; Downing went past Cardiff defender Kevin McNaughton down the left of the pitch and crossed the ball into the penalty area, which was cleared for a corner kick. The resulting corner found Andy Carroll, but his header was deflected out for another corner which was caught by Cardiff goalkeeper Tom Heaton.

Cardiff began to exert themselves in the match and had their first chance in the tenth minute. Peter Whittingham and Aron Gunnarsson exchanged the ball before it was passed to Rudy Gestede, who found Kenny Miller in the Liverpool penalty area, however his resulting shot went over the Liverpool goal. Carroll had a chance to score in the 19th minute but his header was saved by Heaton. Cardiff immediately went on the attack and scored the first goal of the match. Martin Škrtel's clearance from McNaughton's initial cross went back to the Cardiff player who passed to Miller, he passed the ball to Joe Mason who had run onto the pass from the right hand side of the pitch. His subsequent shot went through the legs of Liverpool goalkeeper Pepe Reina and into the Liverpool goal to give Cardiff a 1–0 lead. Liverpool responded by pushing men forward in an attempt to level the score. The first chance after Cardiff's goal saw defender Daniel Agger advance from his own half towards the Cardiff goal but his shot from 30 yards (27 m) was blocked and went out for a throw-in. Liverpool had another chance from a similar distance a few minutes later but Carroll sent his shot over the crossbar. Liverpool had a penalty appeal turned down in the 32nd minute when Ben Turner was adjudged not to have handled the ball. Immediately afterwards Johnson's cross was cleared by Mark Hudson, the ball fell to Charlie Adam who sent his shot just wide of the Cardiff goal. Just before half-time Liverpool had a chance to equalise, but Agger's header from Gerrard's free-kick was saved by Heaton.

=== Second-half ===
Liverpool had the first attack of the half when they were awarded a free-kick for foul on José Enrique. The subsequent free-kick was cleared by Whittingham only as far as Henderson whose shot was wide of the Cardiff goal. Two minutes later Cardiff had a chance to extend their lead; Whittingham went past Agger and passed to Don Cowie, who back heeled the ball to Miller, his subsequent shot went wide of the Liverpool goal. Henderson received the first yellow card of the match after his tackle on Mason was deemed to be too high. Cardiff had another chance in the 56th minute; a Gunnarsson long throw was punched away by Reina, but the clearance fell to Hudson, who headed the ball into the Liverpool penalty area to Gestede, his subsequent header was blocked by the Liverpool goalkeeper. Liverpool made the first substitution of the match a minute later when Henderson was replaced by Craig Bellamy. Two minutes after the substitution, Liverpool equalised. Downing took a corner kick, which was headed on by Carroll to Suárez, whose header hit the post, it rebounded to Škrtel; his shot went into the Cardiff goal to level the match at 1–1. Cardiff had the first chance after Liverpool's goal, but Mason's shot was saved by Reina.

The minutes after Škrtel's goal saw Liverpool dominate, but they were unable to score a second goal despite a number of chances. Liverpool conceded a free-kick 22 yards (20 m) from their goal after Miller was fouled. Whittingham's subsequent shot hit Liverpool players and went out for a Cardiff throw-in. The resulting throw from Gunnarsson was flicked on by Gestede, but it was headed away by Liverpool. Minutes later, Cardiff had a chance to score, but Turner's header from Cowie's pass went wide of the Liverpool goal. Two minutes later, Liverpool had another chance to score, but Charlie Adam's shot was saved by Heaton. Liverpool made their second substitution of the match in the 87th minute when Jamie Carragher replaced Agger. Two minutes before the end of the match, Cardiff had a chance to score: Liverpool conceded a free-kick, which was passed to Miller, who was in space, but his went over the Liverpool goal. With the scores level at 1–1, the match went into extra time after the referee brought an end to the 90 minutes of play.

=== Extra time ===
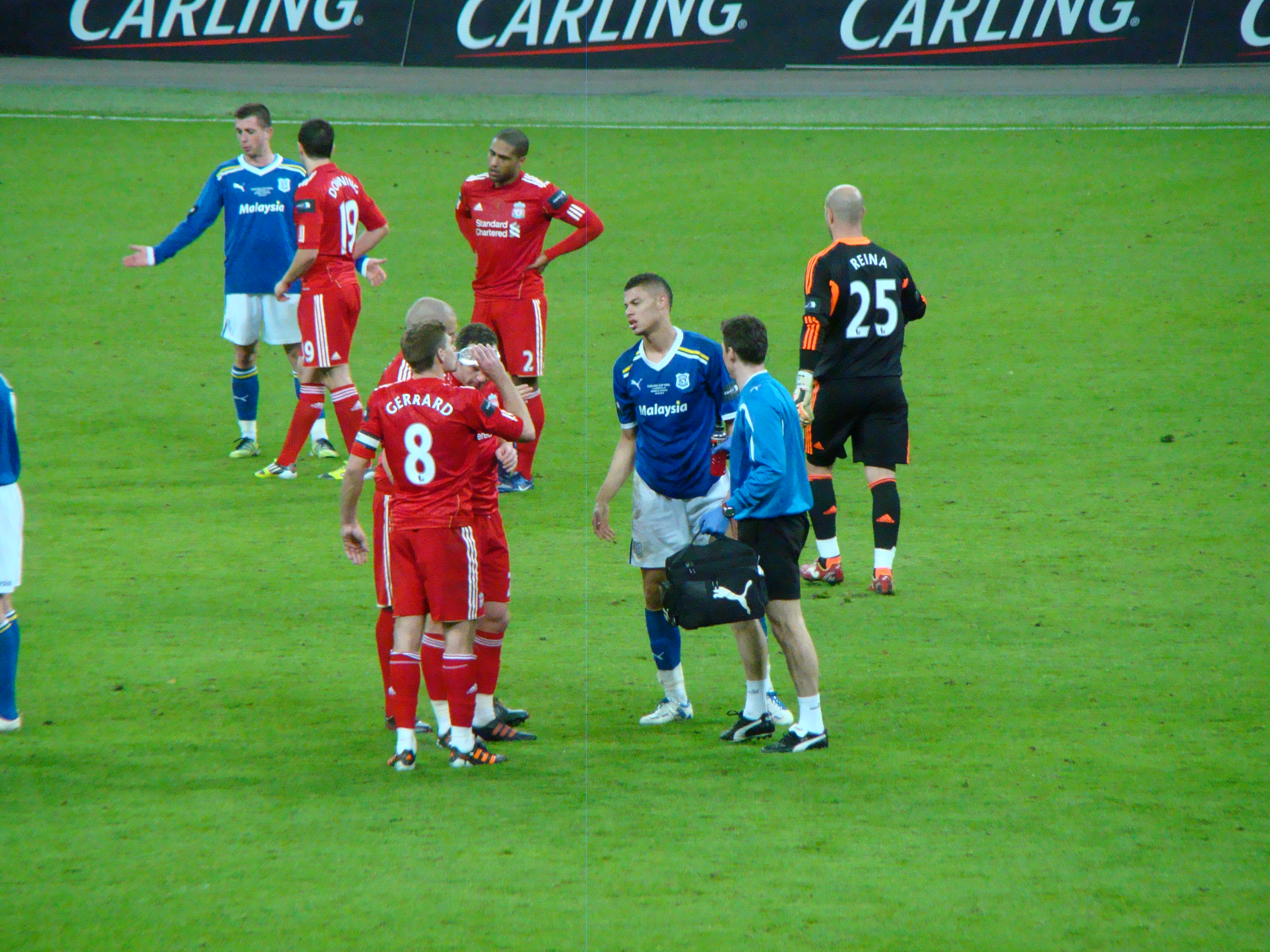
Players from both sides taking a break during the changeover of ends in extra time

Before the start of extra time Cardiff made their first substitution of the match, goalscorer Mason was replaced by Filip Kiss. Liverpool had the first chance to score in extra time, but Suárez's header was cleared off the line by Andrew Taylor. Cardiff appeared to be playing for a penalty shoot-out, as they were positioning the majority of their team behind the ball and in front of their goal. Cardiff captain Hudson was replaced in the 98th minute by Anthony Gerrard after suffering from cramp. Liverpool had another chance in the 101st minute, when a pass by Gerrard was cleared for a corner kick by Taylor. The resulting corner was met by Carroll, but his header was wide of the Cardiff goal. Immediately after the attack Carroll was replaced by Dirk Kuyt. Just before the end of the first half of extra time Liverpool had another chance. Bellamy went past two men down the left hand side of the pitch before exchanging passes with Kuyt, however his subsequent shot went wide.

Just after the start of the second half of extra time Cardiff made their final substitution, replacing McNaughton with Darcy Blake. Two minutes later Kuyt made a run from deep in the Liverpool half, his initial shot was blocked, but the ball rebounded towards him. As the ball came back to him he shot again and the ball went past Heaton and into the Cardiff goal to give Liverpool a 2–1 lead. Cardiff were struggling after the goal with a number of their players suffering from cramp. Nevertheless, they had a chance in the 111th minute, when a Gunnarsson long throw was only half-cleared by Liverpool, but they were unable to convert the chance. Towards the end of the half Cardiff began to exert more pressure on Liverpool. Turner, who had been moved into the striker position won a corner for Cardiff, which was punched away by Reina for a throw-in. Cardiff won another from the throw, which found Kiss, whose shot was cleared off the line of the Liverpool goal by Kuyt for another corner. The subsequent corner was headed on by Gunnarsson to Turner, who beat Kuyt to the ball and put his shot past Reina into the Liverpool goal to level the score at 2–2. Turner was shown a yellow card for removing his shirt during the celebration of the goal. Liverpool won a corner with a minute remaining but they were unable to score and the referee brought extra time to an end with the scores level, resulting in a penalty shoot-out.

=== Penalty shoot-out ===
Liverpool were the first team to take a penalty, but Gerrard's effort was saved by Heaton. Cardiff's first penalty was taken by Miller, but he also missed with his shot hitting the post. Adam took the next penalty for Liverpool, he also missed, placing his shot over the Cardiff goal. Cowie took the next penalty for Cardiff and scored to give them a 1–0 lead. Liverpool also scored with their next penalty courtesy of Kuyt to level the shoot-out at 1–1. Gestede was next for Cardiff, but his penalty hit the post. Liverpool took the lead in the shoot-out when Downing converted his penalty. Whittingham was next for Cardiff and he scored to level the shoot-out at 2–2. Johnson took the next penalty for Liverpool and scored, to give Liverpool a 3–2 lead and leave Cardiff needing to score or Liverpool would win. The Cardiff penalty was taken by Anthony Gerrard, but he missed his penalty, which meant Liverpool won the shoot-out 3–2 and won their eighth League Cup.

=== Details ===
26 February 2012
16:00 GMT

Cardiff City (Wales)	2–2 (a.e.t.)	(England) Liverpool
Mason 19'; Turner 118'	Report	Škrtel 60'; Kuyt 108'
Penalties
Miller (penalty missed); Cowie (penalty scored); Gestede (penalty missed); Whittingham (penalty scored); A. Gerrard (penalty missed)	2–3	(penalty missed) S. Gerrard; (penalty missed) Adam; (penalty scored) Kuyt; (penalty scored) Downing; (penalty scored) Johnson

Wembley Stadium, London
Attendance: 89,041
Referee: Mark Clattenburg (County Durham)

Cardiff City	Liverpool

GK	22	(England) Tom Heaton
RB	2	(Scotland) Kevin McNaughton		(substituted off) 106'
CB	5	(England) Mark Hudson (c)		(substituted off) 99'
CB	25	(England) Ben Turner	(yellow card) 119'
LB	3	(England) Andrew Taylor
RM	8	(Scotland) Don Cowie
CM	7	(England) Peter Whittingham
CM	17	(Iceland) Aron Gunnarsson
LM	20	(Republic of Ireland) Joe Mason		(substituted off) 91'
SS	9	(Scotland) Kenny Miller
CF	15	(France) Rudy Gestede
Substitutes:
GK	1	(Scotland) David Marshall
DF	6	(Republic of Ireland) Anthony Gerrard		(substituted on) 99'
DF	18	(England) Lee Naylor
MF	4	(Slovakia) Filip Kiss	(yellow card) 98'	(substituted on) 91'
MF	11	(Scotland) Craig Conway
MF	23	(Wales) Darcy Blake		(substituted on) 106'
FW	10	(Wales) Robert Earnshaw
Manager:
(Scotland) Malky Mackay

GK	25	(Spain) Pepe Reina
RB	2	(England) Glen Johnson
CB	37	(Slovakia) Martin Škrtel
CB	5	(Denmark) Daniel Agger		(substituted off) 86'
LB	3	(Spain) José Enrique
CM	8	(England) Steven Gerrard (c)
CM	26	(Scotland) Charlie Adam
RW	14	(England) Jordan Henderson	(yellow card) 52'	(substituted off) 58'
AM	7	(Uruguay) Luis Suárez
LW	19	(England) Stewart Downing
CF	9	(England) Andy Carroll		(substituted off) 103'
Substitutes:
GK	32	(Brazil) Doni
DF	23	(England) Jamie Carragher		(substituted on) 86'
DF	34	(England) Martin Kelly
MF	11	(Argentina) Maxi Rodríguez
MF	20	(England) Jay Spearing
FW	18	(Netherlands) Dirk Kuyt		(substituted on) 103'
FW	39	(Wales) Craig Bellamy		(substituted on) 58'
Manager:
(Scotland) Kenny Dalglish

Man of the match

- Stewart Downing (Liverpool)

Match officials

- Assistant referees:
  - Simon Beck (Bedfordshire)
  - Mick McDonough (Northumberland)
- Fourth official: Anthony Taylor (Greater Manchester)

Match rules

- 90 minutes.
- 30 minutes of extra time if necessary.
- Penalty shoot-out if scores still level.
- Seven named substitutes.
- Maximum of three substitutions.

=== Statistics ===
Overall
Statistic	Cardiff	Liverpool
Total shots	11	39
Shots on target	7	19
Ball possession	47%	53%
Corner kicks	3	19
Fouls committed	11	14
Offsides	1	5
Yellow cards	2	1
Red cards	0	0

== Post-match ==
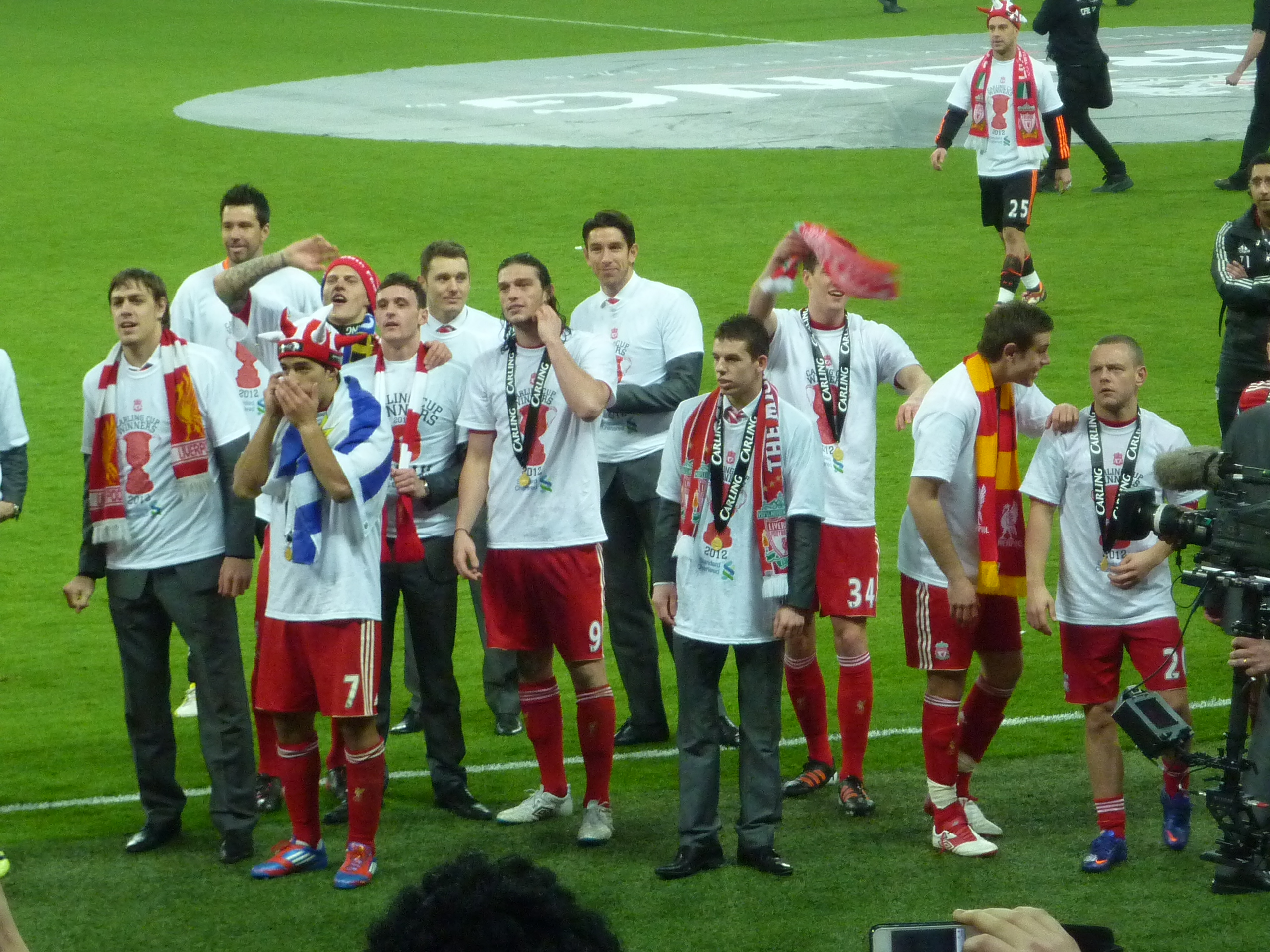
The Liverpool players celebrating their victory after the trophy presentation

Liverpool's victory meant they won the trophy for the eighth time, extending their record number of victories in the competition. Midfielder Stewart Downing was awarded the Alan Hardaker Trophy as the man of the match. Liverpool manager Kenny Dalglish was delighted to have won the League Cup and was adamant that the club would continue to win trophies: "Although we have won something today, that is not us finished, we don't want to stop here. We want to keep going. We've won it and we are going to really enjoy it. I know how much the players have enjoyed it and it gives you a wee flavour to come back and do it again." The victory meant that Dalglish became the seventh manager to win all three major domestic trophies in English football. Goalscorer Dirk Kuyt was equally delighted to have won the competition: "We wanted this so desperately, this is why I came to Anfield. To get my first medal is great." Meanwhile, captain Steven Gerrard had mixed emotions, due to his cousin Anthony Gerrard missing the deciding penalty: "One of Anthony or I was going to be sad, one was going to be celebrating. It happens. I've got mixed emotions at the moment because I feel for Anthony and Cardiff."

Cardiff manager Malky Mackay was proud of his players despite their defeat: "We wanted to come here and win today but the players have done the club proud, I think today we were playing against a top team and I think we have got a lot to be proud of." Anthony Gerrard, who missed the decisive penalty took to Twitter to apologise to Cardiff fans stating that the miss would "...haunt me for the rest of my days!" Despite Gerrard's apology, Cardiff goalkeeper Tom Heaton was adamant that none of the players should take the blame for the defeat: "There is definitely no blame attached to any of the lads who missed. They all had the strength of character to stand up and take a penalty in front of 90,000 people and the world watching in a pressure situation. They should be credited and congratulated for taking them. Sadly, it wasn’t our day.”

Liverpool's first match after the final was against Arsenal, a match the club needed to win to stay in touch with the top four. Two goals from Robin van Persie, after Liverpool had scored in the first half meant that Liverpool lost 2–1 and were 10 points behind the team in 4th place, which would ensure qualification for the UEFA Champions League the following season. Liverpool's league form continued to falter after the final; they won four of their last thirteen matches and ended the season in eighth place. Despite their poor league form, Liverpool reached the final of the FA Cup against Chelsea. But they were unable to win a second trophy and lost 2–1. Cardiff played West Ham United in their first match after the final, which they lost 2–0. Despite the loss, they only needed to win one more in their remaining thirteen matches to finish in 6th place and qualify for the Championship playoffs. They faced third placed West Ham United, in the playoffs, which were contested over two-legs, with one at each team's home ground. Cardiff were unable to secure a second Wembley final, as West Ham United won 5–0 on aggregate.
