= Ishmel Demontagnac =

English footballer

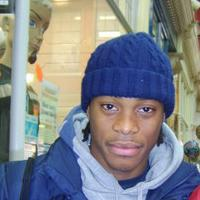
- Demontagnac in 2008

Personal information
- Full name: Ishmel Abendigo Demontagnac
- Date of birth: 15 June 1988 (age 38)
- Place of birth: Newham, England
- Height: 5 ft 10 in (1.78 m)
- Position: Winger

Youth career
- Arsenal
- Charlton Athletic
- –2005: Walsall

Senior career*
Years	Team	Apps	(Gls)
2005–2008	Walsall	82	(9)
2009–2011	Blackpool	9	(0)
2010	→ Chesterfield (loan)	10	(3)
2011	→ Stockport County (loan)	7	(2)
2011–2012	Notts County	17	(0)
2012–2014	Northampton Town	37	(1)
2014	Thurrock	3	(0)
Total		165	(15)

International career
2005	England U18	1	(0)
2006	England U19	1	(0)
- * Club domestic league appearances and goals as of 21 January 2015

Ishmel Abendigo Demontagnac (born 15 June 1988) is an English former footballer who played as a winger.

Demontagnac previously played for Walsall. He has played in all four divisions of professional football in England, in the Football League and Premier League.

He has also represented England at Under-18 and Under-19 levels.

== Club career ==
=== Walsall ===
Born in London, Demontagnac started his playing career with Charlton Athletic, before moving to join the Walsall youth system. Demontagnac created an instant impression on the Walsall coaching staff with his fast pace and footballing talents, especially in getting past defenders.

The 17-year-old Demontagnac marked his October 2005 first team debut with an assist and a goal in a 3–2 defeat away to Port Vale. He went on to make 27 appearances that season, scoring twice, and picked up the club's Young Player of the Year award, but was twice sent off for violent conduct.

Walsall manager Paul Merson was replaced by Richard Money in 2006–07. Money selected Demontagnac for the starting line-up just once in the season, choosing to use him as an impact player from the substitutes' bench. Demontagnac signed a two-year contract extension at the beginning of the 2007–08 season, but again spent most of the season as a substitute. His goal against Brighton and Hove Albion in November 2007 was voted the club's Goal of the Season.

Following a defeat against Crewe Alexandra, new manager Jimmy Mullen recalled him to the first team and handed him a start for The Saddlers against Southend United. Playing up front alongside Jabo Ibehre, Demontagnac scored his first career hat-trick.

In the first round FA Cup tie against Scunthorpe United, he was sent off for an off-the-ball incident only eight minutes after coming on as a substitute. The following day he was arrested on suspicion of a breach of the peace, and on 13 November 2008 his contract with Walsall was terminated. A club statement said that the player's dismissal was the result of "a series of serious breaches of club discipline". Mullen expressed regret over the situation, saying that Demontagnac had the talent to be a Premier League player but his poor conduct held him back.

Following Demontagnac's dismissal by Walsall, Crystal Palace took him on trial. The trial was unsuccessful, but Palace manager Neil Warnock allowed Demontagnac to train and play with the reserve team in the meanwhile.

In January 2009 he went full circle, playing for Charlton Athletic's reserve team on a trial basis. His trial at Charlton was unsuccessful, and later joined Leeds United and then Southend United on trial in March 2009.

=== Blackpool ===
In July 2009 he had a trial with Championship side Blackpool. On 6 August, the Blackpool Gazette reported that Blackpool manager Ian Holloway was likely to offer Demontagnac a month-to-month contract with the Seasiders. The following day he signed a one-year contract with the option for a further 12 months. On 8 August, he was an unused substitute as the Seasiders started the 2009–10 season with a 1–1 draw with Queens Park Rangers at Loftus Road. He made his debut for the Seasiders as a 60th-minute substitute in a 2–1 win over Crewe Alexandra in the first round of the 2009–10 League Cup on 11 August 2009. Demontagnac created Blackpool's winning goal when his pass was fired home by Daniel Nardiello. Four days later he made his league debut, and his 100th career appearance, as a second-half substitute in a 1–1 draw with Cardiff City at Bloomfield Road.

Demontagnac scored on his full debut on 26 August, in the Seasiders' 4–1 victory over Premier League side Wigan Athletic in the second round of the 2009–10 League Cup. However, he suffered a hamstring strain early in the second half and the following day it was revealed that he might be out of action for a few weeks. He made his return to action in a 4–3 Central League Division One West reserve team win over Preston North End on 14 October. However, he was sent off for violent conduct in the second half and so received a three match first team ban which, as it was in a reserve team fixture, began 14 days later. Three days later he made his return to first team action as an 86th-minute substitute in the 2–0 win over Plymouth Argyle at Bloomfield Road. His first league start came in a 3–0 win at home to Sheffield United on 20 October.

On 8 February 2010, Demontagnac was one of three players, along with Barry Bannan and Neal Eardley, disciplined by Ian Holloway, when they were seen out at a nightclub two days previously in Blackpool following the home defeat to Leicester City, even though Demontagnac was due to train with the squad the following day. Holloway explained: "I'm disappointed – we'll have a party once we've got 52 points. If they think that's appropriate, then they're messing with the wrong man. I like a dance with anybody but it's got to be the right time and when you're in a good mood. I'm not in a good mood when I lose and neither should they be." All three were dropped from the squad for the next game, away to Sheffield Wednesday.

On 19 March, Demontagnac joined League Two side Chesterfield on loan for one month. He scored on his debut the following day, a 2–2 draw with Burton Albion at the Pirelli Stadium.

He made his Premier League debut on 21 August as a 57th-minute substitute in the 6–0 defeat to Arsenal at the Emirates Stadium.

On 7 January 2011, he joined Stockport County on loan for a month and was given the number 11 shirt. He scored on his club debut on 8 January in a 5–1 home defeat to Gillingham. He returned to Blackpool on 8 February at the end of his loan.

=== Notts County ===
On 27 May 2011, Demontagnac signed a one-year contract with Notts County with an option of an extension. On 6 August 2011, Demontagnac made his debut coming on as a substitute in a 3–0 win over Carlisle United. He was sent off on 27 December in a 2–1 defeat against Sheffield United at Bramall Lane for throwing the ball in the face of Matthew Lowton.

At the end of the season in May 2012, he was released by the club, along with 12 other players.

=== Northampton Town ===
After his release from Notts County, Demontagnac signed a two-year contract with Northampton Town and joined them on 1 July 2012. He scored his first goal for Northampton in an FA Cup tie against Bradford City on 13 November 2012. His first league goal came against Morecambe on 20 November 2012. He was sent off on 3 September 2013 in a 2–0 defeat against Milton Keynes Dons at Stadium MK for a foul on Dele Alli. On 31 January 2014, Demontagnac had his contract terminated.

== International career ==
Demontagnac was called up into the England under-18 squad in 2005, playing in a 1–0 friendly defeat away to Turkey on 15 November. He went on to play for England under-19s on 5 September 2006 in a 0–0 friendly draw against the Netherlands at the Bescot Stadium, Walsall.

== Career statistics ==
Appearances and goals by club, season and competition
Club	Season	League			FA Cup		League Cup		Other		Total	
Club	Season	Division	Apps	Goals	Apps	Goals	Apps	Goals	Apps	Goals	Apps	Goals
Walsall	2005–06	League One	23	2	2	0	0	0	2 (Note: Appearance in Football League Trophy)	0	27	2
Walsall	2006–07	League Two	19	1	1	0	2	0	1	0	23	1
Walsall	2007–08	League One	30	3	5	1	0	0	1	0	36	4
Walsall	2008–09	League One	10	3	1	0	0	0	1	0	12	3
Walsall	Total		82	9	9	1	2	0	5	0	98	10
Blackpool	2009–10	Championship	8	0	1	0	2	1	0	0	11	1
Blackpool	2010–11	Premier League	1	0	0	0	1	0	—		2	0
Blackpool	Total		9	0	1	0	3	1	0	0	13	1
Chesterfield (loan)	2009–10	League Two	10	3	—		—		—		10	3
Stockport County (loan)	2010–11	League Two	7	2	—		—		—		7	2
Notts County	2011–12	League One	17	0	3	0	0	0	1	0	21	0
Northampton Town	2012–13	League Two	27	1	1	1	0	0	5 (Note: Two appearances in League Two play-offs, three in Football League Trophy)	0	33	2
Northampton Town	2013–14	League Two	10	0	1	0	1	0	1	0	13	0
Northampton Town	Total		37	1	2	1	1	0	6	0	46	2
Thurrock	2014–15	IL Premier Division	3	0	—		—		1 (Note: Appearance in Essex Senior Cup)	0	4	0
Career total			165	15	15	2	6	1	13	0	199	18

== Honours ==
Walsall

- Football League Two: 2006–07

Individual

- Walsall Young Player of the Year: 2005–06
- Walsall Goal of the Year: 2007–08
