= Anthony Gerrard =

Footballer (born 1986)

- Gerrard playing for Cardiff City in 2011

Personal information
- Full name: Anthony Gerrard
- Date of birth: 6 February 1986 (age 40)
- Place of birth: Huyton, England
- Height: 6 ft 2 in (1.88 m)
- Position: Centre back

Youth career
- 1994–2004: Everton

Senior career*
Years	Team	Apps	(Gls)
2004–2005	Everton	0	(0)
2004	→ Accrington Stanley (loan)	5	(0)
2004–2005	→ Walsall (loan)	8	(0)
2005–2009	Walsall	155	(7)
2009–2012	Cardiff City	59	(3)
2010–2011	→ Hull City (loan)	41	(5)
2012–2015	Huddersfield Town	81	(2)
2015	→ Oldham Athletic (loan)	6	(0)
2015–2016	Shrewsbury Town	12	(0)
2016	Oldham Athletic	18	(0)
2017–2018	Oldham Athletic	45	(2)
2018–2019	Carlisle United	41	(0)
2019–2020	Chesterfield	10	(0)
Total		481	(19)

International career
2003–2004	Republic of Ireland U18	2	(0)
- * Club domestic league appearances and goals

Anthony Gerrard (born 6 February 1986) is an English former professional footballer who played as a centre back. He made over 500 professional appearances in a career spent mainly in the English Football League, notably at Walsall where he won the 2006-07 League Two title and at Cardiff City where he was on the losing side as he faced his cousin Steven Gerrard's Liverpool side in the 2012 Football League Cup Final. He began his career at the Everton Academy but failed to break into their senior side.

He qualified for the Republic of Ireland at international level through his grandparents and was capped at under-18 level. In July 2020 he announced his retirement from football.

== Club career ==
=== Everton ===
Born in Huyton, Merseyside, Gerrard joined his boyhood club, Everton Academy at age eight and appeared as captain for the youth academy at one point.

His performance in the academy led Gerrard to sign his first professional contract in May 2004 After signing a professional contract with the club, Gerrard went on trial with clubs based in the National League and his impressive performance at the trial led him to be sent out on loan for a month to Accrington Stanley on 6 September 2004. Gerrard made an impressive display at Accrington Stanley and was keen on extending his loan spell for another month. However, this never happened and he returned to Everton. After returning to Everton, his return was soon short-lived when he suffered a knee injury whilst playing in the reserve., The injury was initially believed to be serious, but Gerrard managed to make a recovery

Later the same season, he was sent out on loan, this time to Paul Merson's Walsall. Gerrard made his Walsall debut two days later on 26 March 2005, playing 90 minutes, in a 1–0 loss against Oldham Athletic. Gerrard made a name for himself and impressed there, as he went on to make eight appearances. Gerrard was released by Everton at the end of the 2004–05 season.

=== Walsall ===
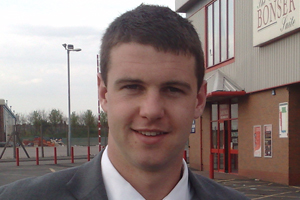
Gerrard in 2008

Weeks after being released by Everton, Gerrard signed for Walsall alongside Everton youth teammate Danny Fox. Gerrard 's first appearance after signing for the club on a permanent basis came in the opening match of the season, where he played 90 minutes, in a 2–1 win over Rotherham United. After making a name for himself at Walsall, Gerrard signed a contract extension with the club, keeping him until 2008. However, Gerrard's first full season for the club was mixed as, while his individual performances earned him the Player of the Year award, the club suffered relegation to League Two.

In the 2006–07 season, Gerrard managed to remain in the first team and started for the first nine matches until he received a straight red card for a high tackle, in a 5–0 win over Peterborough United on 9 September 2006. After serving three match as a result following an unsuccessful appeal, Gerrard soon scored his first Walsall goal on 30 September 2006, in a 4–0 win over Mansfield Town. Injuries soon restricted him from the first team and made 36 appearances in the 2006–07 season. However, under new manager Richard Money, Gerrard was part of the team which won the following season's League Two title in 2007.

In the 2007–08 season, Gerrard said he determined to play well in attempt to earn a new contract following Walsall's promotion to League One. Gerrard then scored his Walsall goal of the season, in a 4–0 win over Huddersfield Town on 6 October 2007. At the end of December, Gerrard signed a contract with the club, keeping him until 2010. Towards the end of the season, Gerrard formed a central defence partnership with Scott Dann and went on to score two more goals against Brighton & Hove Albion and Cheltenham Town. Once again, Gerrard was voted for the Player of the Year award.

A series of impressive performances in Walsall's first season back in League One led to a bid for Gerrard from Southampton in the summer of 2008. After the bid was rejected Gerrard made a transfer request. After this, Gerrard stayed at the club, though he was stripped of his captaincy because of his action. Despite this, Gerrard remained in the first team at Walsall then scored his first goal of the season, in a 3–1 win over Northampton Town on 1 November 2008. Gerrard continued to be in the transfer speculation in January, but remained at the club for the rest of the season. Despite suffering injuries towards the end of the season, Gerrard scored two more goals against Brighton & Hove Albion and Stockport County. Gerrard went on to make 42 appearances in the 2008–09 season.

=== Cardiff City ===
On 2 July 2009, Gerrard signed for Championship club Cardiff City, a week after an offer of £200,000 was rejected from Scunthorpe United.

At the start of the season, Gerrard was chosen as first choice centre-back, alongside club captain Mark Hudson and went on to make his League debut for the Bluebirds against Scunthorpe United in the first League match at the Cardiff City Stadium, as Cardiff went on to win 4–0. His first goal came on 20 October 2009 against Coventry City during a 2–0 victory. Gerrard made his 200th club appearance in a 1–1 draw with Nottingham Forest on 1 November 2009 and scored his second goal for the club on 9 February 2010, in a 2–0 win over Peterborough United. After suffering a calf injury that kept him sidelined for four matches, Gerrard made his return to the team and set up one of Michael Chopra's goals, in a 2–1 win over rivals, Swansea City on 3 April 2010. In his first season at Cardiff City, Gerrard finished the season, making 39 appearances and scoring two times.

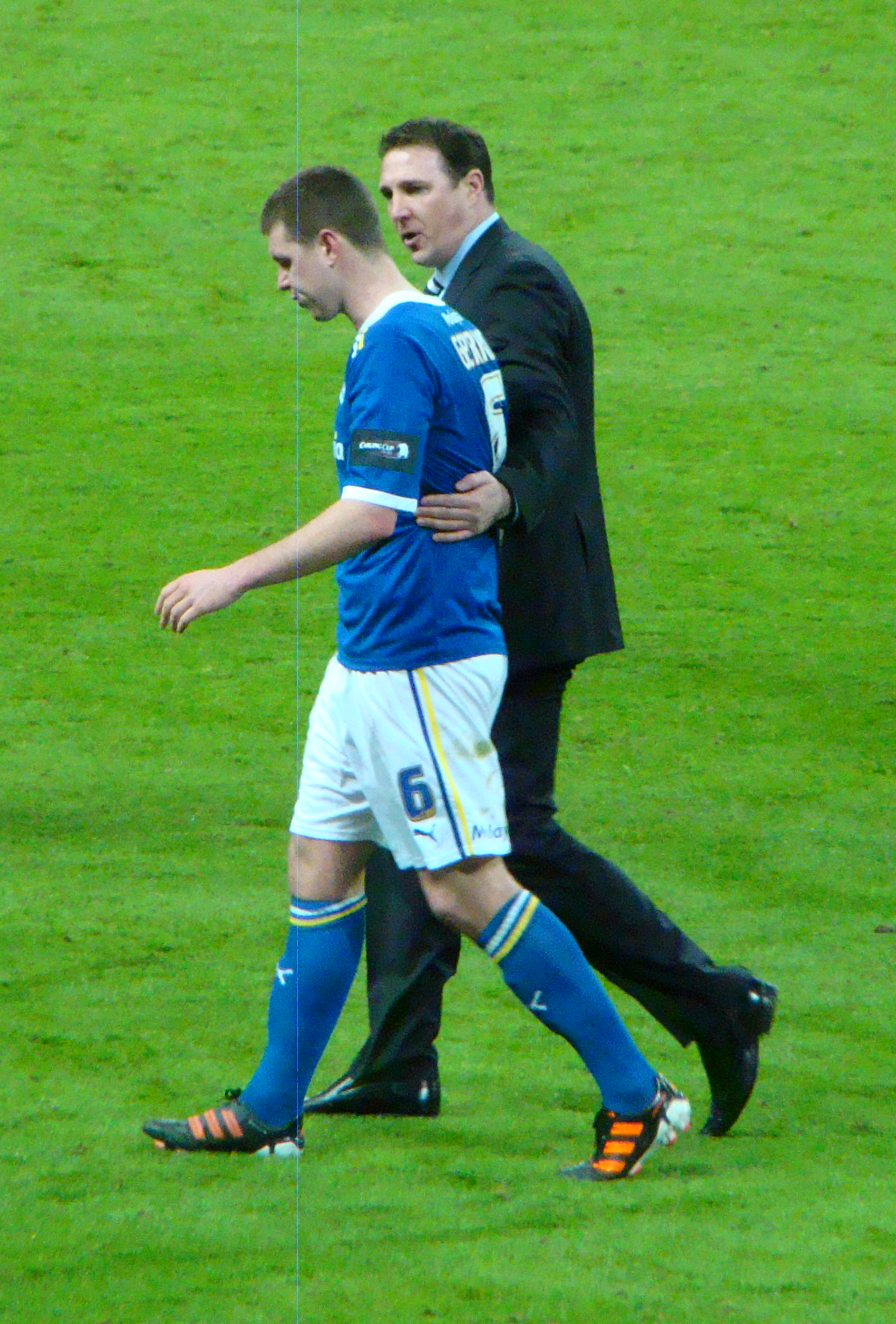
Gerrard consoled by Malky Mackay following his decisive penalty kick miss in the 2012 League Cup Final

Upon his return to Cardiff, Dave Jones had been sacked and Malky Mackay had been put in place. Gerrard started two pre-season matches against Celtic and AFC Bournemouth before receiving a concussion within four minutes against Bournemouth. Gerrard returned to Cardiff City starting line up on the opening day of the season. His first goal of the season came in as the opener in a 2–0 victory over Doncaster Rovers on 10 September 2011. New signing Ben Turner managed to keep Gerrard out of the squad but an injury to captain Mark Hudson meant he was reinstated in the squad. A second goal came against Blackburn Rovers in the League Cup, on 29 November 2011, which was also his first ever goal in the competition and scored his second league goal of the season on 14 February 2012, in a 3–1 win over Peterborough United.

The 2012 League Cup Final marked the first time Gerrard played against his cousin Steven Gerrard in a competitive football match. Anthony's club Cardiff City took on Steven's Liverpool. Liverpool won the trophy after a penalty shoot-out, during which both Gerrards missed penalty kicks. Following his penalty miss which handed the League Cup to Liverpool, Gerrard apologises on Twitter, his tweet saying:

"Sorry to everyone!""I can't close my eyes wid out seeing that penalty!! It's goin to haunt me for the rest of my days! Head is mashed!"

Four years on, Gerrard said missing the penalty in the League Cup final still haunted him. After the match, Gerrard never played again for the 2011–12, as his relationship with Malky MacKay was deteriorated.

Cardiff decided to leave Gerrard behind from their pre-season trip to Switzerland and then later rejected a bid from an unnamed Championship club. On 3 August 2012, Cardiff rejected bids from Bristol City and Leicester City believed to be around £200,000.

==== Hull City (loan) ====
Out of favour at the start of the 2010–11 season behind Gábor Gyepes and Hudson, Gerrard was linked with a loan move away from Cardiff City and joined Hull City on 31 August 2010 on a season long loan. One provision of the move allowed Gerrard to play against Cardiff in the forthcoming clash between the two teams, in exchange for Seyi Olofinjana, on loan from Hull to Cardiff, to be allowed to turn out for the Bluebirds.

Gerrard made his Hull City debut against his parent club, Cardiff City, where he played 90 minutes and saw Hull City lose 2–0. Gerrard then scored his first goal for the club in the 2–2 draw against Middlesbrough at the Riverside Stadium on 27 November 2010. On 12 February 2011, he scored his second goal, a header from an Andy Dawson corner, in the 1–0 win against Preston North End at the KC Stadium, followed up his third goal of the season one week later against Derby County, which proved to be the winning goal of the match, with the match ending 1–0 to Hull City at Pride Park. His fourth goal for the East Riding of Yorkshire club came in the 2–4 home defeat to Middlesbrough after a long range free-kick and his fifth goal of the season at the KC Stadium came in a 1–1 draw against Crystal Palace on 7 May 2011.

On 9 May 2011, it was announced that Gerrard had been named by Hull City's fans as their player of the season for the 2010–11 season. The following day, Gerrard returned to Cardiff, but was unable to play in the Championship play-offs.

=== Huddersfield Town ===
On 7 August 2012, Gerrard signed a three-year contract at newly promoted Championship club Huddersfield Town for an undisclosed fee. He made his Huddersfield debut in the League Cup first round 2–0 away defeat to Preston North End on 13 August 2012 playing 75 minutes. He made his league début in the 1–0 defeat by Cardiff City at the Cardiff City Stadium on 17 August, coming on as a late substitute against his former club. On 22 December 2012, Gerrard was sent-off in the 80th minute after a foul on Yannick Bolasie, in a 1–1 draw against Crystal Palace. After having his red card rescinded following the club's appeal, Gerrard started the match against Blackpool at the John Smith's Stadium on 26 December 2012 and scored his first goal for the club, in the 1–1 draw. Then on 12 February 2013, Gerrard captained for the club for the first time to cover for Peter Clarke, in a 2–1 win over Leicester City in fourth round replay. In his first season at Huddersfield Town, Gerrard made 38 appearances for the club.

Gerrard suffered a calf injury during training in the 2013–14 pre-season. After returning to training, nevertheless, Gerrard managed to regain his first team place for the 2013–14 season in the central defence. However, after missing out for two matches, due to Mark Robins' decision, Gerrard scored on his return on 9 November 2013, in a 3–1 loss against Birmingham City. During a match against Millwall that saw Huddersfield Town win 1–0 on 11 January 2014, Gerrard was involved that saw him resulted having a gashed eye that he needed stitches. Though he suffered an injury in mid-March,

Gerrard fell out of favour under the management to Chris Powell, as well as, his own injury concern. After months on the sideline, Gerrard then made his first appearance of the 2014–15 season on 20 December 2014, where he played 90 minutes, in a 1–0 loss against Birmingham City. With increasingly lack of first team opportunities, Gerrard was told by the club's management he can leave the club in the January transfer window. Gerrard was placed on a loan list, as Powell previously stated in November he can be loaned to get more playing time.

After falling out of favour at the John Smith's Stadium, Gerrard was loaned to League One club Oldham Athletic on 19 March 2015. Two days after signing for the club on loan, Gerrard made his Oldham Athletic debut, playing 90 minutes, in a 1–0 win over Crewe Alexandra. Despite suffering from a muscle injury, Gerrard went on to make six appearances for Oldham Athletic towards the end of the season. Gerrard also spoke out a permanent move to Oldham Athletic, citing the club's supporters and first team opportunities.

Upon returning to his parent club, Gerrard was released by the club.

=== Shrewsbury Town ===
Following his release from Huddersfield Gerrard had a brief spell on trial with Southend United, and then moved on to Shrewsbury Town. He was signed on an initial non-contract basis, and made his debut as a substitute in a 2–0 home victory over Bury on 25 October 2015.

Gerrard revealed to the press that having received no offers over the close season, he was playing for free at Shrewsbury in a bid to get his professional football career going again. This arrangement was cancelled by mutual consent in January 2016.

=== Oldham Athletic ===
After being released by Shrewsbury Town, Gerrard re-joined Oldham Athletic on 26 January 2016 for the second time until the end of the season.

Gerrard made his Oldham Athletic on the same day, in a 1–0 win over Shrewsbury Town, the club he previously played for. Gerrard immediately established himself in the first team at Oldham Athletic, playing in the central defence position and helped the club retain their League One status ahead of the new season by helping the club avoid relegation. His performance against Walsall on 9 April 2016 earned him Team of the Week. After the last match of the season against Millwall, Gerrard claimed that he was slapped by a Millwall supporter after Millwall's supporters invaded the pitch at full-time. This led to FA investigation.

After making 17 appearances for Oldham Athletic, Gerrard was offered a new contract by the club. However, Gerrard declined the offer and became a free agent.

After again spending the first half of the 2016–17 season without a club Gerrard began training with Oldham and signed a two-and-a-half-year contract on 20 January 2017.

=== Carlisle United ===
After being dismissed by Oldham for racism, Gerrard signed for League Two club Carlisle United on 9 August 2018 on a contract until January 2019.

He was released by Carlisle at the end of the 2018–19 season.

=== Chesterfield ===
On 27 June 2019, Gerrard joined Chesterfield.

After making 11 appearances for the National League club, his contract was cancelled by mutual consent on 23 January 2020.

== International career ==
Born in England, Gerrard qualifies for the Republic of Ireland, through his grandparents. He represented the Republic of Ireland's under-18 team earlier in his career. On 4 March 2011, Gerrard pledged his allegiance to the Republic of Ireland and said "I pledged my allegiance to the Republic and I would love the chance to play for the senior squad." In April 2011, Gerrard received full clearance to play for the Republic of Ireland.

== Personal life ==
Gerrard and his wife, Laura, have two sons and one daughter.

Gerrard is a cousin of former England captain Steven Gerrard. Gerrard is also a cousin of Jon-Paul Gilhooley, who was the youngest of the 97 victims of the Hillsborough disaster on 15 April 1989. Gerrard is also good friends with Danny Fox, having played together at Walsall and Everton. Despite progressing through the Everton Academy, Gerrard grew up supporting Liverpool.

== Career statistics ==
As of match played 29 February 2020

Appearances and goals by club, season and competition
Club	Season	League			FA Cup		League Cup		Other		Total	
Club	Season	Division	Apps	Goals	Apps	Goals	Apps	Goals	Apps	Goals	Apps	Goals
Everton	2004–05	Premier League	0	0	0	0	0	0	—		0	0
Accrington Stanley (loan)	2004–05	Conference National	5	0	—		—		1 (Note: Appearance(s) in Football League Trophy)	0	6	0
Walsall (loan)	2004–05	League One	8	0	—		—		—		8	0
Walsall	2005–06	League One	34	0	5	0	0	0	2	0	41	0
Walsall	2006–07	League Two	35	1	0	0	1	0	1	0	37	1
Walsall	2007–08	League One	44	3	4	0	1	0	1	0	50	3
Walsall	2008–09	League One	42	3	1	0	1	0	2	0	46	3
Walsall	Total		163	7	10	0	3	0	6	0	182	7
Cardiff City	2009–10	Championship	39	2	4	0	3	0	1 (Note: Appearance in Championship play-offs)	0	47	2
Cardiff City	2010–11	Championship	0	0	—		2	0	—		2	0
Cardiff City	2011–12	Championship	20	1	1	0	4	1	0	0	25	2
Cardiff City	Total		59	3	5	0	9	1	1	0	74	4
Hull City (loan)	2010–11	Championship	41	5	1	0	—		—		42	5
Huddersfield Town	2012–13	Championship	38	1	4	0	1	0	—		43	1
Huddersfield Town	2013–14	Championship	40	1	2	0	2	0	—		44	1
Huddersfield Town	2014–15	Championship	3	0	1	0	0	0	—		4	0
Huddersfield Town	Total		81	2	7	0	3	0	—		91	2
Oldham Athletic (loan)	2014–15	League One	6	0	—		—		—		6	0
Shrewsbury Town	2015–16	League One	12	0	4	0	—		—		16	0
Oldham Athletic	2015–16	League One	18	0	—		—		—		18	0
Oldham Athletic	2016–17	League One	14	0	—		—		—		14	0
Oldham Athletic	2017–18	League One	31	2	0	0	1	0	5 (Note: Appearances in EFL Trophy)	1	37	3
Oldham Athletic	2018–19	League Two	0	0	—		—		—		0	0
Oldham Athletic	Total		63	2	0	0	1	0	5	1	69	3
Carlisle United	2018–19	League Two	41	0	2	0	1	0	0	0	44	0
Chesterfield	2019–20	National League	10	0	0	0	0	0	0	0	10	0
Career total			481	19	29	0	17	1	13	1	540	21

== Honours ==
Walsall

- Football League Two: 2006–07

Cardiff City

- Football League Cup runner-up: 2011–12

Individual

- Walsall Player of the Year: 2005–06, 2007–08
- Hull City Player of the Year: 2010–11
