= Troy Deeney =

English footballer (born 1988)

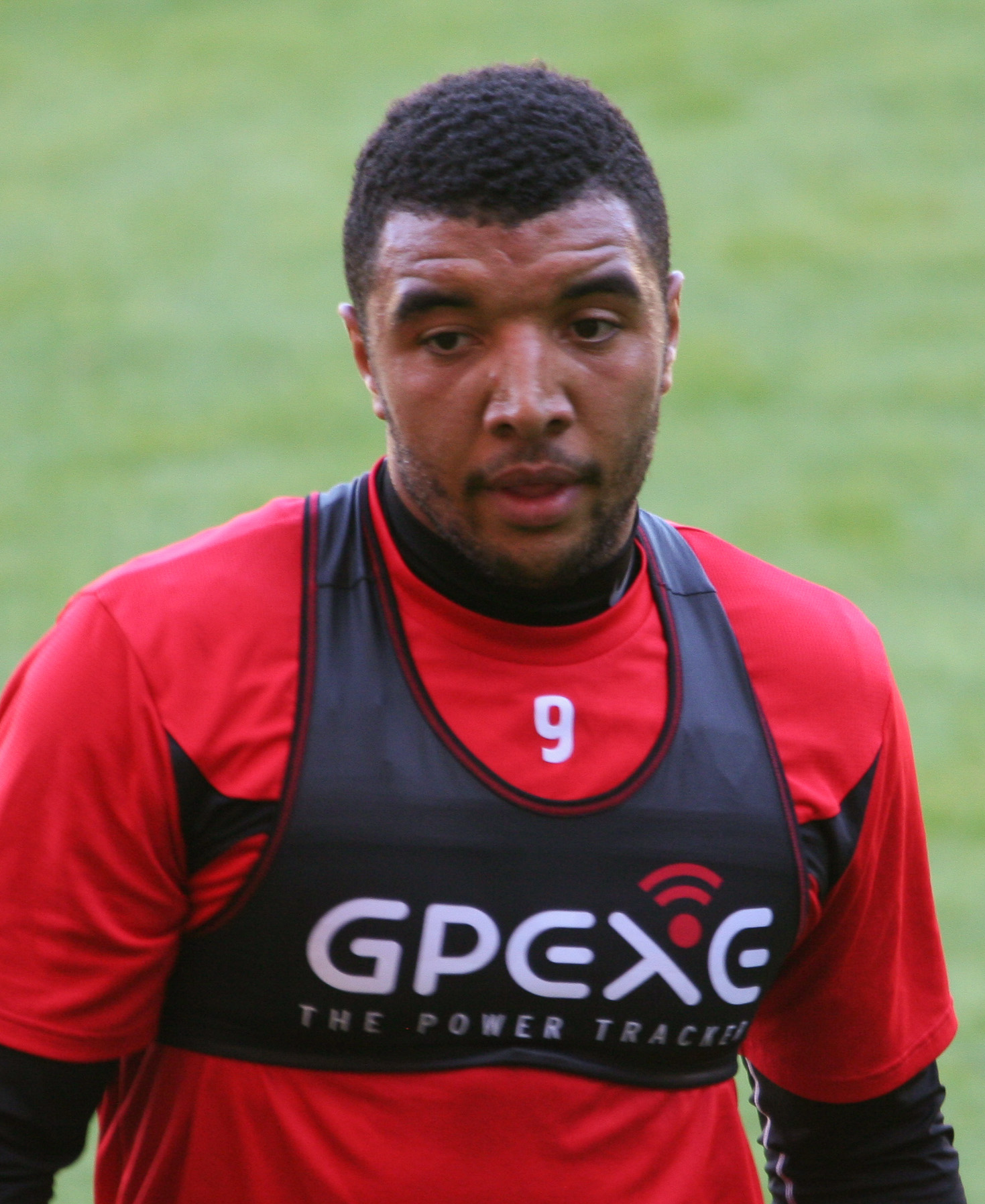
- Deeney training with Watford in 2014

Personal information
- Full name: Troy Matthew Deeney
- Date of birth: 29 June 1988 (age 38)
- Place of birth: Solihull, England
- Height: 6 ft 0 in (1.83 m)
- Position: Striker

Youth career
- 2004–2005: Chelmsley Town

Senior career*
Years	Team	Apps	(Gls)
2004–2005	Chelmsley Town reserves	3	(0)
2004–2006	Chelmsley Town	56	(23)
2006–2010	Walsall	123	(27)
2006–2007	→ Halesowen Town (loan)	10	(8)
2010–2021	Watford	389	(131)
2021–2023	Birmingham City	54	(11)
2023–2024	Forest Green Rovers	16	(4)
Total		651	(204)

Managerial career
- 2023–2024: Forest Green Rovers
- * Club domestic league appearances and goals

Troy Matthew Deeney (born 29 June 1988) is an English professional football pundit, manager, and former player who played as a striker.

Deeney started his professional career with Chelmsley Town in 2004. Two seasons later, he joined fellow club Walsall. He spent a brief spell on loan with Southern League Premier Division club Halesowen Town during the 2006–07 season. He transferred to Championship club Watford in 2010 and captained the team to promotion to the Premier League in the 2014–15 season. After 11 years and more than 400 matches with Watford, he left the club as a free agent in August 2021 and spent two years with Birmingham City. He joined Forest Green Rovers in August 2023 in a player-coach role and became permanent manager later that year, but was sacked in January 2024.

He is currently a pundit for CBS Sports and appears on the Morning Footy show.

== Early life ==
Troy Matthew Deeney was born on 29 June 1988 in Solihull, West Midlands, one of three children born to his parents, and grew up in Chelmsley Wood. At the age of 10, Deeney and his mother were assaulted by his father, leading to visits from social services. The couple split when Deeney was 11 with his mother taking custody of their children. He maintained a relationship with his father, who was a drug dealer in Deeney's local area. Deeney was expelled from school when he was 14, before returning at the age of 15 but left at 16 without any GCSEs. Since 2012 he has earned GCSEs in English, Science and Maths.

== Club career ==
=== Early career ===
Deeney was invited by the Aston Villa academy to take part in a four-day summer trial at the age of 15 with a view to earning a youth contract; however, he missed the first three days as he "knew there was a game on the last day" and was not offered terms by Villa. After leaving school in 2004 he had begun training as a bricklayer, earning £120 a week, and joined Chelmsley Town. He made his debut on 9 October 2004 in a 2–1 victory against Mile Oak Rovers, only coming into the first team as several players were unavailable because the game was an early kick-off – it had been brought forward to avoid clashing with England's 2006 World Cup Qualifier against Wales. After holding down a regular place in the team, Deeney went on to win Chelmsley Town's Player of the Year for the 2005–06 season.

=== Walsall ===
Deeney was spotted by Walsall's Head of Youth Mick Halsall, who only attended the match because his son was also playing, and because the match he was scheduled to attend had been postponed. Deeney was playing while drunk, but scored seven goals in an 11–4 win. He was offered a trial by the then League Two club, but only attended after his Chelmsley manager got him out of bed and paid for his taxi. After signing for Walsall on 18 December 2006, Deeney was instantly sent out to Halesowen Town on loan for the rest of the 2006–07 season.

He scored his first professional competitive goal for Walsall against Millwall in a 2–1 win in September 2007. This turned out to be his only goal of the 2007–08 season, and the 2008–09 season started similarly, with him managing only two goals in the first half of the season. However, the introduction of Chris Hutchings as manager coincided with Deeney finding a goalscoring touch. Helped by the fact that his new manager started playing him in his favoured striking position, instead of on the right wing as the previous manager Jimmy Mullen had, Deeney scored nine goals in Hutchings' first 12 matches in charge. On 9 September 2009, it was announced that Deeney had signed a new two-year deal until 2011. In the 2009–10 season, Deeney scored 14 goals to finish as Walsall's top scorer and was awarded the club's Player of the Year award.

=== Watford ===
==== 2010–2012 ====
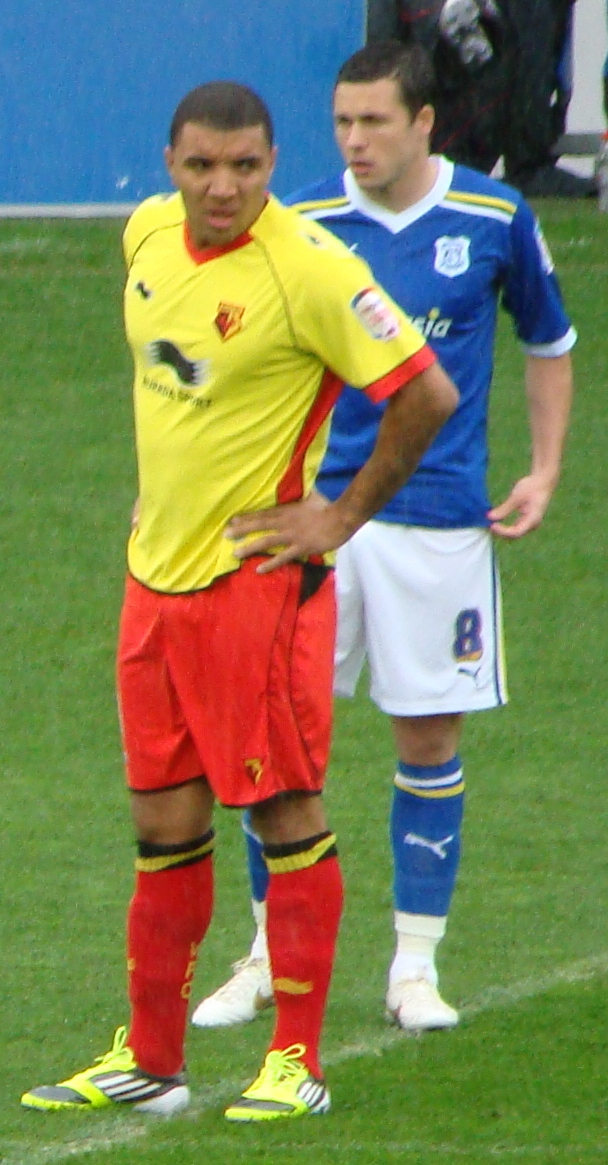
Deeney (left) playing for Watford in 2012

On 4 August 2010, Deeney handed in a written transfer request amid interest from several Championship clubs. He had been told he was to leave Walsall earlier in the summer, and had slackened his pre-season training in protest at the club's hardline stance when trying to sell him. He signed for Watford two days later for an initial fee of £250,000 rising up to £500,000 on a two-year contract that lifted his salary from £1,200 to £6,000 a week. Walsall also negotiated a 20% sell-on fee for any profit were Watford to sell him in the future, something that later would complicate potential transfers away from the club according to Deeney in 2018. On the same day Deeney signed for Watford, he played a part in their 3–2 win against Norwich City on the opening day of the season, coming on for Marvin Sordell in the second half. Deeney found his poor pre-season meant he struggled for fitness in comparison to his new teammates. He scored his first Watford goal against Notts County in the first round of the League Cup on 24 August. Deeney went on to make 40 appearances for Watford in his first season, scoring three goals from 20 starts, although he was mainly deployed on the wing by Malky Mackay.

At the beginning of the 2011–12 campaign, Deeney initially found it hard to acquire a starting spot in the team as many of his early season matches saw him consigned to a bench role. He soon found his way into the starting eleven and amassed a total of 46 appearances under the management of Sean Dyche in his preferred position as striker. In March, Deeney signed a new contract to the end of the 2012–13 season. He finished 2011–12 as Watford's top goalscorer with 12 goals in all competitions and also won the Goal of the Season Award for his goal against Ipswich Town in March 2012.

==== 2012–2015 ====
Deeney made his first appearance for Watford, after his release from prison, against Bristol City at Vicarage Road on 22 September 2012. The match finished 2–2, with Deeney coming on in the second half and hitting the post. He started the next match against Huddersfield Town on 29 September, and scored the winner from a spot kick in the 3–2 away win. He scored a memorable double against his boyhood club, Birmingham City, as Watford ran out 4–0 winners on 16 February 2013.

In March 2013, Deeney signed a new contract with Watford, keeping him at the club until 2016. Deeney netted another brace in a 4–0 win over Blackburn Rovers on 20 April 2013, taking his tally to 18 for the season. Six days later, he scored his 19th goal of the season in the next match against Leicester, scoring the first goal in an important 2–1 away win for Watford.

"Knockaert takes, Almunia saves… Knockaert follows in, Almunia saves again. Absolutely astonishing. Now here come Watford. Forestieri. Here's Hogg… Deeney! Do not scratch your eyes, you are really seeing the most extraordinary finish here! It almost mirrors the final day! With the very last kick of this play-off semi-final, Troy Deeney wins it for Watford and sends them to Wembley!"

— Commentary by Sky Sports' Bill Leslie on Manuel Almunia's penalty save and Deeney's winning goal.

On 12 May 2013, Watford faced Leicester City in the play-off semi-final second leg at Vicarage Road, having lost the first leg 1–0 at the King Power Stadium. One of the most dramatic moments in play-off history occurred in injury time. With the scores level on aggregate at 2–2, Manuel Almunia saved a penalty taken by Anthony Knockaert and a rebound. Watford subsequently charged to the other end, where Deeney lashed in the winning goal; ecstatic, he celebrated the goal by taking his shirt off and jumping into the crowd. On 27 May, Deeney started for the play-off final against Crystal Palace, which Watford lost 1–0 in extra-time.

After scoring 20 goals in the 2012–13 season, Deeney scored the only goal as Watford beat Birmingham City 1–0 in the opening match of the 2013–14 season. A week later on 10 August, Deeney scored a hat-trick as Watford thrashed Bournemouth 6–1 at Vicarage Road. In doing so, he became the first Watford player to score a hat-trick in a match since Michael Chopra in 2003, and the first one to do so at Vicarage Road since David Connolly on 7 December 1996. It was also Deeney's first career hat-trick.

Netting a brace in a 4–1 win away against Sheffield Wednesday on 29 March 2014, Deeney took his 2013–14 season tally to 20 goals. In the process, he became the first Watford player to score 20 or more goals in consecutive seasons in all competitions since Luther Blissett managed the feat in 1983.

Deeney scored again, this time against Burnley in a 1–1 draw on 5 April 2014, to become the first Watford player to score 20 league goals in consecutive seasons since Cliff Holton managed the feat in 1961. The striker won both the Watford Player of the Season award for 2013–14 and also won the Players' Player of the Year at the end of season awards on 2 May 2014.

Following the departure of Manuel Almunia, Deeney was named the Watford captain by manager Giuseppe Sannino prior to the 2014–15 campaign. During the course of the 2014–15 Championship season, Deeney helped Watford earn promotion to the Premier League. In the process he became the first player in Watford history to score 20 or more goals in three consecutive seasons (2012–13, 2013–14, 2014–15).

==== 2015–2020: Premier League years ====
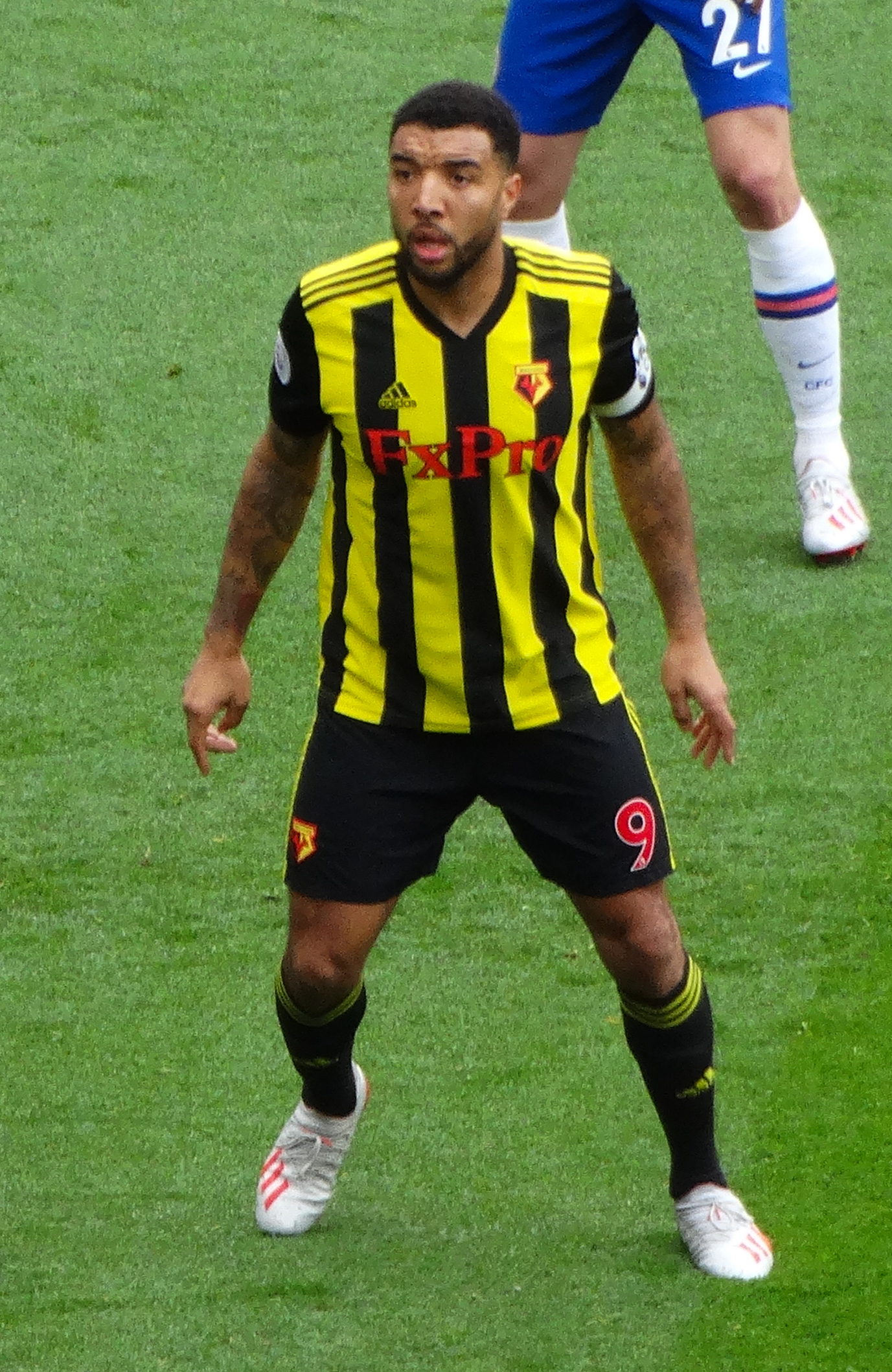
Deeney playing for Watford in 2019

On 8 August 2015, Deeney made his Premier League debut, captaining Watford in their 2015–16 season opener, a 2–2 draw with Everton at Goodison Park. On 24 October, he scored his first Premier League goal as Watford defeated Stoke City 2–0 at the Britannia Stadium. On 21 November, Deeney scored a penalty against Manchester United in the 87th minute to equalise; just after that, he scored an own goal in the 90th minute to help Manchester United secure a 2–1 victory over Watford in a dramatic change of events at Vicarage Road. Deeney would extend his goal streak to five in six matches with the opener in a 2–0 win against Norwich City on 5 December 2015. On 13 February 2016, he scored twice in a 2–1 away win over Crystal Palace and in the process extended the Eagles' winless run in the league to nine matches.

On 1 July 2016, Deeney signed a new five-year deal with Watford. He opened his 2016–17 goalscoring account on 10 September at West Ham United's new home venue, the London Stadium, equalising in a 4–2 comeback victory. Deeney scored his 100th Watford goal in all competitions on 26 December 2016 with a penalty in a 1–1 home draw against Crystal Palace, ending a ten-match goalless run. He became the fifth player to reach a century of goals for Watford. Since summer 2018 he has given up gambling entirely and alcohol in weeks Watford are playing.

In April 2019, Deeney, alongside Watford teammates Adrian Mariappa and Christian Kabasele were subjected to racist comments on social media.

In May 2020, following the Premier League's suspension due to the COVID-19 pandemic, Deeney initially refused to return to non-contact training with his teammates. He said he did not wish to put his five-month-old child at risk, who has breathing difficulties, saying "it only takes one person to get infected within the group and I don't want to be bringing that home." Deeney eventually returned to training and captained Watford in their first game back against Leicester City, playing the full 90 minutes. On 11 July, he scored two second-half penalties to come from behind and win at home against Newcastle United, giving Deeney his first goals of the restarted season. Deeney revealed after the game he had been suffering from a right knee injury since the restart, but vowed to see out the end of the season as club captain and try to save Watford from relegation. Following this announcement, Deeney was often substituted in the second half of most games for the remainder of the season to ease the workload on his knee. He scored again in a 3–1 loss against West Ham United on 17 July, later coming off in the second half. In Watford's final game of the 2019–20 season against Arsenal, Deeney played the full 90 minutes and scored a penalty in the first half, but was unable to prevent Watford losing 3–2, finishing in 19th and suffering relegation to the EFL Championship. After this loss, it was highly speculated that Deeney had played his last game for the club; Deeney commented, saying he was "unsure" about his future at Watford.

==== 2020–21: Championship return ====
Despite widespread rumours of his impending departure and reported interest from Tottenham Hotspur, West Bromwich Albion and Fenerbahçe, Deeney remained with Watford throughout the summer transfer window and came off the bench during their 1–0 win over Luton Town on 26 September 2020. Watford secured immediate promotion back to the Premier League on 24 April 2021, after a 1–0 home victory over Millwall.

==== Immediate Premier League return and final games and departure ====
Deeney came on as a 79th-minute substitute for Tom Cleverley in Watford's first match since their return to the top flight on 14 August 2021, helping secure a win after beating Aston Villa 3–2 at home Deeney made his final appearance for Watford as a 78th-minute substitute, replacing Ken Sema in a 2–0 away loss to Brighton & Hove Albion on 21 August.

On 30 August 2021, it was announced that Deeney had left Watford as a free agent after spending eleven years with the club; he had made 419 appearances for the team and scored 140 goals. He left the club as their top scorer in the Premier League with 47 goals and ranks fourth for most goals scored for Watford in all competitions, behind Luther Blissett (186), Tommy Barnett (163) and Ross Jenkins (142).

=== Birmingham City ===
On 30 August 2021, Deeney signed a two-year contract with Birmingham City, the team he had supported since childhood. He made his debut, as a 67th-minute substitute for Lukas Jutkiewicz in a 2–0 home victory over Derby County on 10 September, and five days later scored his first Birmingham goal, a late penalty in a 4–1 loss at home to Fulham. Over the two years he spent with Birmingham, he scored 11 goals from 56 appearances in all competitions, and was appointed club captain in January 2022. He was one of six senior professionals released at the end of the 2022–23 season.

== Coaching career ==
=== Forest Green Rovers ===
Deeney joined League Two club Forest Green Rovers on 17 August 2023 as a player-coach. Prior to joining Forest Green, Deeney confirmed he had received an offer from Australian club Melbourne Victory. On his debut two days later, he came on as a substitute in a 3–0 home loss to Newport County, and on 26 August he came from the bench and scored the equaliser in a 1–1 draw at AFC Wimbledon. Deeney scored a hat-trick on 23 September, though his team lost 4–3 away to Notts County.

After manager David Horseman left the club by mutual consent, Deeney was appointed head coach on a permanent basis on 20 December 2023, at which time the team were 23rd in League Two, five points from safety. Two days later on his debut, the team drew 0–0 away to Gillingham. Following a 2–0 loss to Harrogate Town in January 2024, Deeney publicly criticised his squad, stating that he said that he would "rather watch Antiques Roadshow" than his team, in addition to singling out right-back Fankaty Dabo as "awful." Former professionals Chris Sutton, Shay Given, and Martin O'Neill criticised his public comments. Deeney stood by his comments but later expressed regret at telling the media, stating "I don't apologise for what I said, I just apologised as it was said in public." On 18 January 2024, Deeney was sacked as manager after no wins in six matches. Hours before his dismissal, he had been given a four-match ban and fined £1,500 by the Football Association for his conduct in a defeat to Swindon Town on 29 December.

== International career ==
In October 2015, Deeney revealed that he had twice rejected invitations to play for Jamaica internationally and that he harboured an ambition of playing for England. Deeney originally believed he was eligible to play for Northern Ireland but that possibility was quickly ruled out as neither his parents nor grandparents are from Northern Ireland. Having never been selected for England at a youth level, Deeney remained uncapped.

== Personal life ==
Deeney is divorced from his wife Stacy, with whom he had a son and a daughter. He has been in a relationship with model Alisha Hosannah since July 2018. He is a lifelong supporter of Birmingham City and has the club crest tattooed on his calf.

His brother, Ellis, is a semi-professional footballer who plays as a central midfielder. Ellis started his career at Aston Villa, where he was captain of their academy team before being released.

On 25 June 2012, Deeney was sentenced to ten months' imprisonment after pleading guilty to a charge of affray, having attacked a group of students outside a nightclub. The Guardian reported that a "30-second video clip, which was played to the court several times, clearly showed both Troy Deeney and Brennan [Deeney's friend] kicking out at the "defenceless" students, one of whom received repeated blows to the head as he lay injured." He was released after serving almost three months of the sentence. Deeney has cited his grief surrounding his father's death from cancer in May 2012 as a reason for the behaviour leading to his arrest.

In March 2020, Deeney was hospitalised with COVID-19 and spent five days in hospital with a high temperature and kidney and intestine issues. He was on a ventilator for four days and admitted that he "struggled for breath" in Watford's last match before lockdown.

In October 2020, Deeney began working as a guest writer for The Sun, penning a fortnightly column for the paper's sports section. He is also a weekly guest on Talksport's Monday morning breakfast show, appearing alongside Laura Woods and Ally McCoist. In April 2021, he launched a podcast, Deeney Talks.

Deeney took part on Celebrity Mastermind in 2023. He answered no questions correctly on his specialist subject, the Spider-Man films of Sam Raimi, but came third of four contestants.

In April 2025, Deeney took part in Ballers League UK, making his debut for Ian Wright and Chloe Kelly’s Wembley Rangers AFC. Deeney failed to score and was shown a straight red card for a lunge onto FC RTW opponent Tareiq Holmes-Dennis with a reckless push off the ball.

In July 2025, Deeney was named in the line-up for Celebrity SAS: Who Dares Wins.

== Career statistics ==
Appearances and goals by club, season and competition
Club	Season	League			FA Cup		League Cup		Other		Total	
Club	Season	Division	Apps	Goals	Apps	Goals	Apps	Goals	Apps	Goals	Apps	Goals
Chelmsley Town	2004–05	Midland Football Combination; Division Two	25	2	—		—		1 (Note: Appearance in Birmingham Saturday Vase)	0	26	2
Chelmsley Town	2005–06	Midland Football Combination; Division Two	22 (Note: Source lists 21 league appearances and two appearances (0 goals) under the Fixture Type 'VOID' – league matches against teams who withdrew part-way through the season. While the record of Nunnery Wood Sports was expunged, and therefore Deeney's appearance in this fixture has not been included, the record of Himley Athletic was allowed to stand, and therefore Deeney's appearance in this fixture has been counted as a league match)	14	—		—		1 (Note: Appearance in Midland Football Combination Challenge Vase)	1	23	15
Chelmsley Town	2006–07	Midland Football Combination; Division Two	9	7	—		—		6 (Note: 2 appearances in Birmingham Saturday Vase; 2 appearances & 1 goal in Coventry Telegraph Challenge Cup; 1 appearance in Midland Football Combination Jack Mould Trophy; 1 appearance & 2 goals in Smedley Crooke Memorial Charity Cup)	3	15	10
Chelmsley Town	Total		56	23	—		—		8	4	64	27
Chelmsley Town reserves	2005–06	Midland Football Combination; Division Three	3	0	—		—		0	0	3	0
Walsall	2006–07	League Two	1	0	—		—		—		1	0
Walsall	2007–08	League One	35	1	4	0	0	0	1 (Note: Appearance(s) in Football League Trophy)	0	40	1
Walsall	2008–09	League One	45	12	1	0	1	0	2	0	49	12
Walsall	2009–10	League One	42	14	2	0	1	0	1	0	46	14
Walsall	Total		123	27	7	0	2	0	4	0	136	27
Halesowen Town (loan)	2006–07	Southern League; Premier Division	10	8	—		—		—		10	8
Watford	2010–11	Championship	36	2	2	0	2	1	—		40	3
Watford	2011–12	Championship	43	11	2	1	1	0	—		46	12
Watford	2012–13	Championship	40	19	1	0	0	0	2 (Note: Appearances in Championship play-offs)	1	43	20
Watford	2013–14	Championship	44	24	3	1	1	0	—		48	25
Watford	2014–15	Championship	42	21	1	0	0	0	—		43	21
Watford	2015–16	Premier League	38	13	5	2	0	0	—		43	15
Watford	2016–17	Premier League	37	10	2	0	1	0	—		40	10
Watford	2017–18	Premier League	29	5	1	1	1	0	—		31	6
Watford	2018–19	Premier League	32	9	5	2	0	0	—		37	11
Watford	2019–20	Premier League	27	10	0	0	0	0	—		27	10
Watford	2020–21	Championship	19	7	0	0	0	0	—		19	7
Watford	2021–22	Premier League	2	0	0	0	0	0	—		2	0
Watford	Total		389	131	22	7	6	1	2	1	419	140
Birmingham City	2021–22	Championship	21	4	1	0	—		—		22	4
Birmingham City	2022–23	Championship	33	7	1	0	0	0	—		34	7
Birmingham City	Total		54	11	2	0	0	0	—		56	11
Forest Green Rovers	2023–24	League Two	16	4	1	0	—		1 (Note: Appearance in EFL Trophy)	0	18	4
Career total			651	204	32	7	8	1	15	5	706	217

== Managerial statistics ==
As of match played 13 January 2024

Managerial record by team and tenure
Team	From	To	Record				
Team	From	To	P	W	D	L	Win %
Forest Green Rovers	20 December 2023	18 January 2024	6	0	3	3	0.0
Total			6	0	3	3	0.0

== Honours ==
Watford

- Football League/EFL Championship second-place promotion: 2014–15, 2020–21
- FA Cup runner-up: 2018–19

Individual

- PFA Team of the Year: 2014–15 Championship
