= Manny Smith =

English footballer

Personal information
- Full name: Emmanuele Gabriel Smith
- Date of birth: 8 November 1988 (age 38)
- Place of birth: Birmingham, England
- Height: 6 ft 2 in (1.88 m)
- Position: Defender

Youth career
- –2006: Walsall

Senior career*
| Years | Team | Apps | (Gls) |
| 2006–2012 | Walsall | 124 | (7) |
| 2007 | → Halesowen Town (loan) | 5 | (0) |
| 2012–2014 | Notts County | 29 | (0) |
| 2014–2016 | Wrexham | 90 | (1) |
| 2016–2017 | Gateshead | 44 | (4) |
| 2017–2020 | Wrexham | 53 | (4) |
| Total | | 345 | (16) |
- * Club domestic league appearances and goals as of 19:59, 30 December 2018 (UTC)

Emmanuele Gabriel Smith (born 8 November 1988) is an English former professional footballer who played as a defender for Walsall, Notts County, Wrexham and Gateshead.

== Career ==
=== Walsall ===
Born in Birmingham, West Midlands, Smith progressed through the youth system at Walsall, eventually signing a one-year contract in May 2006, which kicked off his professional career.

He was captain of Walsall reserve team during the 2006–07 season. He was on the verge of the first team during this very season, however the management at Walsall believed that he lacked that competitive match experience which was needed to become a first-team regular.

He was allowed to link up with Southern Football League Premier Division side, Halesowen Town on loan. During his short time at the club Smith made five league appearances for the Birmingham-based outfit before returning to Bescot Stadium, to make his professional debut on 7 April 2007 in Walsall's Football League Two clash with Torquay United. The centre half came on as a 70th-minute substitute in this game replacing Craig Pead.

Smith started the 2007–08 campaign in high spirit after making his debut in the previous season, he had also just signed another contract with the club in May 2007, meaning he would remain at the Bescot Stadium until May 2008.

This would prove to be a difficult season for him, especially if he wanted to climb back up the ladder and break back into the first-team. However, during the start of the season he failed to do so spending a lot of time playing in the reserve side. February 2008, turned out to be a big month him following the sale of defensive colleague Scott Dann, who joined Coventry City towards the very end of the January transfer window.

Despite the summer departure of fellow centre half Ian Roper, Smith remained as only the third choice centre half due to the arrival of Stephen Roberts from Doncaster Rovers.

He signed a new two-year contract with the club on 10 May 2010.

In February 2012, Smith was disciplined by the club for his offensive tweet to a lifelong supporter.

=== Notts County ===
On 9 July 2012, Smith signed a two-year deal with League One club Notts County. He played his first competitive game for the club in a League Cup match against Bradford City. However, he was stretchered off in the first half after twisting his knee in a challenge with Alan Connell, it was later confirmed by Keith Curle that Smith would be out for three months.

=== Wrexham ===
On 5 August 2014, he signed with Conference Premier side Wrexham. The 25-year-old centre-back joined the Dragons on a one-year deal after impressing on trial. Smith played in every minute of Wrexham's 61 league and cup games with 1 goal, the opening goal in the 3–1 win over Maidstone in the FA Cup 2nd round, in the 2014–15 season as his performances earned him the club's Player of the Season award.

Smith signed a new one-year deal with Wrexham after the 2014–15 season, keeping him at the Red Dragons for the 2015–16 season. He played in his 100th career appearance for Wrexham, as the beat Cross-border rivals Chester, 3–0 at the Racecourse.

=== Gateshead ===
Smith was released by Wrexham at the end of the 2015–16 season, and signed a two-year contract with another National League club, Gateshead.

=== Return to Wrexham ===
On 7 June 2017, Smith returned to Wrexham after cancelling his contract with Gateshead for personal reasons. During the 2017–18 season, Smith was a key player in Wrexham's all-time best defensive record, which earned him a spot in the National League team of the season.

On 14 January 2020, Smith announced his retirement after being unable to overcome a serious knee injury.

== Career statistics ==
As of match played 14 February 2020

Appearances and goals by club, season and competition
| Club | Season | League | | | FA Cup | | League Cup | | Other | | Total | |
| Club | Season | Division | Apps | Goals | Apps | Goals | Apps | Goals | Apps | Goals | Apps | Goals |
|---|---|---|---|---|---|---|---|---|---|---|---|---|
| Walsall | 2006–07 | League Two | 3 | 0 | 0 | 0 | 0 | 0 | 0 | 0 | 3 | 0 |
| Walsall | 2007–08 | League One | 4 | 0 | 0 | 0 | 0 | 0 | 0 | 0 | 4 | 0 |
| Walsall | 2008–09 | League One | 26 | 0 | 0 | 0 | 1 | 0 | 0 | 0 | 27 | 0 |
| Walsall | 2009–10 | League One | 33 | 4 | 2 | 0 | 1 | 0 | 1 (Note: Appearances in Football League Trophy) | 0 | 37 | 4 |
| Walsall | 2010–11 | League One | 25 | 2 | 2 | 0 | 1 | 0 | 1 | 0 | 29 | 2 |
| Walsall | 2011–12 | League One | 33 | 1 | 3 | 0 | 0 | 0 | 2 | 0 | 38 | 1 |
| Walsall | Total | | 124 | 7 | 7 | 0 | 3 | 0 | 4 | 0 | 138 | 7 |
| Halesowen Town (loan) | 2006–07 | SL Premier Division | 5 | 0 | — | | — | | — | | 5 | 0 |
| Notts County | 2012–13 | League One | 5 | 0 | 0 | 0 | 1 | 0 | 0 | 0 | 6 | 0 |
| Notts County | 2013–14 | League One | 24 | 0 | 0 | 0 | 2 | 0 | 2 | 0 | 28 | 0 |
| Notts County | Total | | 29 | 0 | 0 | 0 | 3 | 0 | 2 | 0 | 34 | 0 |
| Wrexham | 2014–15 | Conference Premier | 46 | 0 | 5 | 1 | — | | 10 (Note: Appearances in FA Trophy) | 1 | 61 | 2 |
| Wrexham | 2015–16 | National League | 44 | 1 | 1 | 0 | — | | 2 | 1 | 47 | 2 |
| Wrexham | Total | | 90 | 1 | 6 | 1 | — | | 12 | 2 | 108 | 4 |
| Gateshead | 2016–17 | National League | 44 | 4 | 2 | 0 | — | | 2 | 1 | 48 | 5 |
| Wrexham | 2017–18 | National League | 45 | 3 | 1 | 0 | — | | 0 | 0 | 46 | 3 |
| Wrexham | 2018–19 | National League | 8 | 1 | 0 | 0 | — | | 0 | 0 | 8 | 1 |
| Wrexham | 2019–20 | National League | 0 | 0 | 0 | 0 | — | | 0 | 0 | 0 | 0 |
| Wrexham | Total | | 53 | 4 | 1 | 0 | 0 | 0 | 0 | 0 | 54 | 4 |
| Career totals | | | 345 | 16 | 16 | 1 | 6 | 0 | 20 | 3 | 386 | 20 |

== Honours ==
Wrexham

- FA Trophy runner-up: 2014–15
