= Josh Craddock =

English footballer

Personal information
- Full name: Joshua Glynn Craddock
- Date of birth: 5 March 1991 (age 35)
- Place of birth: Wolverhampton, England
- Height: 6 ft 1 in (1.85 m)
- Position: Forward

Team information
- Current team: Stafford Rangers

Youth career
- ?–2008: Walsall

Senior career*
Years	Team	Apps	(Gls)
2008–2009	Walsall	15	(0)
2009	Halesowen Town	12	(1)
2010	Hednesford Town	34	(0)
2010–2012	Stourbridge		
2012–2015	Rushall Olympic		
2015–	Stafford Rangers		
- * Club domestic league appearances and goals

Joshua Glynn Craddock (born 5 March 1991) is a footballer, who plays for Rushall Olympic.

== Career ==
Craddock started his senior career in the Football League for Walsall. He made his debut on 3 May 2008 as a substitute in the Football League One clash with Hartlepool United which finished as a 2–2 draw.

In August 2009, Walsall confirmed that Craddock had chosen to leave professional football and go to study at University full-time. The club retain his registration. After leaving Walsall, Craddock spent time with Halesowen Town before joining Hednesford Town in February 2010. He joined in August 2010 to Non League side Stourbridge F.C. and in July 2012 to Rushall Olympic.
