= Sam Adkins (footballer) =

English footballer

Personal information
- Date of birth: 3 December 1991 (age 34)
- Place of birth: Birmingham, England
- Position: Midfielder

Youth career
- Walsall

Senior career*
Years	Team	Apps	(Gls)
2008–2010	Walsall	2	(0)
2010	→ Hednesford Town (loan)	4	(1)
2010–2011	Solihull Moors	33	(1)
2011–2013	Leamington	23	(1)
2011–2012	→ Redditch United (loan)		
2012–2013	→ Evesham United (loan)	10	(1)
2013–2016	Stratford Town	65	(4)
2015	→ Tividale (loan)	4	(0)
- * Club domestic league appearances and goals as of 13:00, 3 November 2019 (UTC)

Sam Adkins (born 3 December 1991) is a footballer who plays as a midfielder, most recently for Southern League club Stratford Town.

== Playing career ==
=== Walsall ===
Adkins made his Walsall debut on 17 January 2009 in the Football League One clash with Peterborough United at London Road, which ended in a 1–0 loss. In January 2010, Adkins joined Hednesford Town on loan, scoring one goal in four league appearances before returning to Walsall.

He and six other players were released by Walsall on 10 May 2010.

=== Stratford Town ===
Adkins joined Tividale on loan from Stratford Town on 9 October 2015 on a months loan.
