= 2013–14 Walsall F.C. season =

Walsall
2013–14 season
- Chairman: Jeff Bonser
- Manager: Dean Smith
- Stadium: Bescot Stadium
- League One: 13th
- FA Cup: Second round
- League Cup: Second round
- Top goalscorer: Craig Westcarr (14)
Home colours	Away colours	Third colours

The 2013/14 season saw Walsall finish 13th in League One. The campaign was most notable for the Saddlers' meetings with Black Country rivals Wolves, including a 1–0 away at Molineux.

== Season summary ==
The summer of 2013 saw the Saddlers lose the attacking trio of Will Grigg, Febian Brandy and Jamie Paterson, who had been responsible for close to two-thirds of the club’s goals in the previous campaign. Their replacements included Chelsea loanee Milan Lalkovic, playmaker Romaine Sawyers and striker Troy Hewitt.

After a mixed start, September saw Walsall take on Wolves twice in the space of two weeks. A short trip to Molineux in the Football League Trophy saw Wolves emerge victorious on penalties following a 2–2 draw. However, the Saddlers had the better of the corresponding league fixture, winning 1–0 thanks to a goal from captain Andy Butler. Minor controversy followed the fixture with derogatory comments towards Wolves posted on Walsall’s official Twitter account. The club apologised for the "frankly disgusting" Tweet, which it said was the work of a hacker.

Walsall spent much of the first half of the season in and around the playoff spots, with a 5–1 away victory at Notts County lifting the club into sixth in late January. Despite seemingly being well-placed for a playoff challenge, the Saddlers went on to win just twice in the final 18 games of the season. This included a 3–0 home loss to Wolves, who would finish the season as champions.

This disastrous run saw the Saddlers end the campaign in 13th, 16 points adrift of a playoff place.

== Competitions ==
=== Football League One ===
==== League table ====
Pos	Team	Pld	W	D	L	GF	GA	GD	Pts
11	Bradford City	46	14	17	15	57	54	+3	59
12	Bristol City	46	13	19	14	70	67	+3	58
13	Walsall	46	14	16	16	49	49	0	58
14	Crawley Town	46	14	15	17	48	54	−6	57
15	Oldham Athletic	46	14	14	18	50	59	−9	56

Updated to match(es) played on 3 May 2014. Source: BBC Sport
Rules for classification: 1) Points; 2) Goal difference; 3) Number of goals scored

==== Results ====
Win Draw Loss

3 August 2013 1	Walsall	3–1	Tranmere Rovers	Walsall
15:00 BST	Westcarr 4', 71'; Lalkovic 25'	Report	Robinson 40'	Stadium: Bescot Stadium; Attendance: 4,788; Referee: Brendam Malone

10 August 2013 2	Oldham Athletic	0–1	Walsall	Oldham
15:00 BST		Report	Baxendale 25'	Stadium: Boundary Park; Attendance: 4,538; Referee: Gary Sutton

17 August 2013 3	Walsall	1–1	Notts County	Walsall
15:00 BST	Sawyers 50'	Report	Arquin 74'	Stadium: Bescot Stadium; Attendance: 4,295; Referee: Iain Williamson

24 August 2013 4	Brentford	1–0	Walsall	Brentford, London
15:00 BST	Donaldson 42'	Report		Stadium: Griffin Park; Attendance: 5,781; Referee: Hayward

31 August 2013 5	Walsall	0–3	Preston North End	Walsall
15:00 BST		Report	Byrom 30'; Humphrey 58'; Holmes 61'	Stadium: Bescot Stadium; Attendance: 4,205; Referee: Phil Gibbs

14 September 2013 6	Crewe Alexandra	0–3	Walsall	Crewe
15:00 BST		Report	Westcarr 66', 69' (pen.); Baxendale 84'	Stadium: Gresty Road; Attendance: 4,260; Referee: Keith Hill

17 September 2013 7	Wolverhampton Wanderers	0–1	Walsall	Wolverhampton
19:45 BST		Report	Butler 69'	Stadium: Molineux; Attendance: 22,240; Referee: Mick Russell

21 September 2013 8	Walsall	1–1	Rotherham United	Walsall
15:00 BST	Mantom 34'	Report	Nardiello 21'	Stadium: Bescot Stadium; Attendance: 5,002; Referee: Stuart Attwell

28 September 2013 9	Leyton Orient	1–1	Walsall	Leyton, London
15:00 BST	Mooney 38'	Report	Westcarr 71'	Stadium: Brisbane Road; Attendance: 5,429; Referee: Scott

5 October 2013 10	Walsall	0–2	Bradford City	Walsall
15:00 BST		Report	Reid 45'; Hanson 47'	Stadium: Bescot Stadium; Attendance: 5,364; Referee: Eddie Ilderton

12 October 2013 11	Colchester United	1–1	Walsall	Colchester
15:00 BST	Sears 7'	Report	Taylor 90+7'	Stadium: Colchester Community Stadium; Attendance: 2,945; Referee: Jeremy Simpson

19 October 2013 12	Walsall	2–1	Stevenage	Stevenage
15:00 BST	Sawyers 11'; Westcarr 55'	Report	Zoko 72'; Akins (red card) 80'	Stadium: Broadhall Way; Attendance: 3,720; Referee: Andrew Madley

22 October 2013 13	Swindon Town	1–3	Walsall	Swindon
19:45 BST	Ranger 83'	Report	Hemmings 18' 78'; Mantom 48'	Stadium: County Ground; Attendance: 8,188; Referee: Darren Sheldrake

26 October 2013 14	Walsall	0–1	Coventry City	Walsall
15:00 BST		Report	Moussa 54'	Stadium: Bescot Stadium; Attendance: 6,519; Referee: Gavin Ward

2 November 2013 15	Milton Keynes Dons	1–0	Walsall	Bletchley, Milton Keynes
15:00 GMT	Williams	Report		Stadium: Stadium MK; Attendance: 7,711; Referee: Dean Whitestone

18 November 2013 16	Walsall	2–0	Peterborough United	Walsall
19:45 GMT	Lalkovic 26'; Sawyers 69'	Report	(yellow card) 51' (yellow-red card) 77' Brisley	Stadium: Bescot Stadium; Attendance: 4,597; Referee: David Coote

23 November 2013 17	Crawley Town	0–0	Walsall	Crawley
15:00 GMT		Report		Stadium: Broadfield Stadium; Attendance: 3,296; Referee: Tim Robinson

26 November 2013 18	Sheffield United	1–1	Walsall	Sheffield
19:45 GMT	Porter 45+2' (pen.)	Report	Westcarr 47'	Stadium: Bramall Lane; Attendance: 14,796; Referee: Chris Sarginson

30 November 2013 19	Walsall	0–2	Port Vale	Walsall
15:00 GMT		Report	Pope 20'; Tomlin 66'	Stadium: Bescot Stadium; Attendance: 4,909; Referee: Michael Naylor

14 December 2013 20	Shrewsbury Town	0–1	Walsall	Shrewsbury
15:00 GMT		Report	Lalkovic 54'	Stadium: New Meadow; Attendance: 6,015; Referee: David Phillips

21 December 2013 21	Walsall	2–0	Carlisle United	Walsall
15:00 GMT	Sawyers 15'; Lalkovic 66'	Report		Stadium: Bescot Stadium; Attendance: 4,062; Referee: Darren Bond

26 December 2013 22	Bristol City	1–0	Walsall	Bristol
15:00 GMT	Baldock 41' (pen.)	Report		Stadium: Ashton Gate Stadium; Attendance: 12,031; Referee: David Webb

29 December 2013 23	Gillingham	2–2	Walsall	Gillingham
15:00 GMT	McDonald 46', 90+2'	Report	Sawyers 62'; Gray 90'	Stadium: Priestfield Stadium; Attendance: 5,394; Referee: Trevor Kettle

1 January 2014 24	Walsall	2–1	Sheffield United	Walsall
15:00 GMT	Westcarr 52' (pen.); Chambers 62'	Report	Porter 17'	Stadium: Bescot Stadium; Attendance: 5,015; Referee: Lee Collins

11 January 2014 25	Tranmere Rovers	1–1	Walsall	Birkenhead
15:00 GMT	Stockton 78'	Report	Lalkovič 19'	Stadium: Prenton Park; Attendance: 4,871; Referee: Andy Haines

14 January 2014 26	Walsall	1–0	Oldham Athletic	Walsall
19:45 GMT	Mantom 65'	Report		Stadium: Bescot Stadium; Attendance: 3,522; Referee: Fred Graham

18 January 2014 27	Walsall	1–1	Brentford	Walsall
15:00 GMT	Westcarr 45'	Report	Donaldson 30'	Stadium: Bescot Stadium; Attendance: 5,295; Referee: Scott Duncan

25 January 2014 28	Notts County	1–5	Walsall	Nottingham
15:00 GMT	McGregor 61'	Report	Butler 24', 33', 45+2'; Butler 49'; Westcarr 53'	Stadium: Meadow Lane; Attendance: 5,701; Referee: Darren Sheldrake

28 January 2014 29	Walsall	1–1	Swindon Town	Walsall
19:45 GMT	Sawyers 37'	Report	M. Smith 71'	Stadium: Bescot Stadium; Attendance: 4,059; Referee: Mark Brown

8 February 2014 30	Walsall	0–3	Milton Keynes Dons	Walsall
15:00 GMT	Butler (red card) 43'	Report	McLeod 30', 70'; Reeves 44' (pen.)	Stadium: Bescot Stadium; Attendance: 4,116; Referee: James Linington

14 February 2014 31	Peterborough United	0–0	Walsall	Peterborough
19:45 GMT		Report		Stadium: London Road Stadium; Attendance: 4,263; Referee: Graham Horwood

22 February 2014 32	Walsall	1–2	Crawley Town	Walsall
15:00 GMT	Mantom 64'	Report	Tubbs 4' (pen.), 51'; Clarke (yellow card) 71' (yellow-red card) 80'	Stadium: Bescot Stadium; Attendance: 3,904; Referee: Kevin Wright

1 March 2014 33	Preston North End	2–1	Walsall	Preston
15:00 GMT	Downing 3' (o.g.); Wright 29'	https://www.bbc.co.uk/sport/football/26300271 Report	Mantom 5' (red card) 82'	Stadium: Deepdale; Attendance: 10,034; Referee: Seb Stockbridge

5 March 2014 34	Coventry City	2–1	Walsall	Northampton
19:45 GMT	Wilson 22'; Delfouneso 84'	Report	Benning 54'	Stadium: Sixfields Stadium; Attendance: 1,637; Referee: Richard Clark

8 March 2014 35	Walsall	0–3	Wolverhampton Wanderers	Walsall
15:00 GMT		Report	Dicko 31', 48'; Sako 67'	Stadium: Bescot Stadium; Attendance: 10,139; Referee: Paul Tierney

11 March 2014 36	Walsall	1–1	Crewe Alexandra	Walsall
19:45 GMT	Ellis 90+1' (o.g.)	Report	Aneke 51'	Stadium: Bescot Stadium; Attendance: 3,777; Referee: Tony Harrington

15 March 2014 37	Rotherham United	1–1	Walsall	Rotherham
15:00 GMT	Adams 89'	Report	Lalkovič 19'; Purkiss (yellow card) 47' (yellow-red card) 73'	Stadium: New York Stadium; Attendance: 8,212; Referee: Andy Woolmer

22 March 2014 38	Walsall	1–1	Leyton Orient	Walsall
15:00 GMT	Downing 14'	Report	Clarke 78'	Stadium: Bescot Stadium; Attendance: 5,779; Referee: Tim Robinson

25 March 2014 39	Bradford City	0–2	Walsall	Bradford
19:45 GMT		Report	Westcarr 68', 78'	Stadium: Valley Parade; Attendance: 12,165; Referee: Keith Stroud

29 March 2014 40	Walsall	1–0	Shrewsbury Town	Walsall
15:00 GMT	Westcarr 5' (red card) 72'	Report	Mills (red card) 62'	Stadium: Bescot Stadium; Attendance: 4,222; Referee: Bobby Madley

5 April 2014 41	Port Vale	1–0	Walsall	Burslem, Stoke-on-Trent
15:00 BST	Myrie-Williams 52' (pen.)	Report		Stadium: Vale Park; Attendance: 5,569; Referee: Carl Berry

12 April 2014 42	Walsall	0–1	Bristol City	Walsall
15:00 BST		Report	Baldock 45' (pen.)	Stadium: Bescot Stadium; Attendance: 5,110; Referee: Nigel Miller

18 April 2014 43	Carlisle United	1–1	Walsall	Carlisle
15:00 BST	Noble 13'	Report	Ngoo 82'	Stadium: Brunton Park; Attendance: 4,389; Referee: Darren Drysdale

21 April 2014 44	Walsall	1–1	Gillingham	Walsall
15:00 BST	Brandy 55'	Report	McDonald 84'	Stadium: Bescot Stadium; Attendance: 3,890; Referee: Darren Sheldrake

26 April 2014 45	Stevenage	3–2	Walsall	Stevenage
15:00 BST	Smith 35'; N'Guessan 53'; Freeman 82'	Report	Benning 46'; Westcarr 50'	Stadium: Broadhall Way; Attendance: 2,973; Referee: Graham Horwood

3 May 2014 46	Walsall	0–1	Colchester United	Walsall
15:00 BST		Report	Eastmond 54'	Stadium: Bescot Stadium; Attendance: 4,271; Referee: David Webb

=== FA Cup ===
9 November 2013 First round	Walsall	3–0	Shrewsbury Town	Walsall
15:00	Westcarr 29', 59'; Sawyers 73'	Report		Stadium: Bescot Stadium; Attendance: 3,338; Referee: Charles Breakspear

7 December 2013 Second round	Leyton Orient	1–0	Walsall	Leyton, London
15:00	Cox 41'	Report		Stadium: Brisbane Road; Attendance: 2,604; Referee: Mark Brown

=== League Cup ===
6 August 2013 First round	Port Vale	1–2	Walsall	Burslem, Stoke-on-Trent
19:45 BST	Robertson 59'	Report	Westcarr 43'; Baxendale 84'	Stadium: Vale Park; Attendance: 4,013; Referee: Andy Haines

28 August 2013 Second round	Stoke City	3–1	Walsall	Stoke-on-Trent
19:45 BST	Jones 22', 31', 84'	Report	Hemmings 57'	Stadium: Britannia Stadium; Attendance: 11,667; Referee: Michael Naylor

=== League Trophy ===
3 September 2013 First round	Wolverhampton Wanderers	2–2 (4–2 p)	Walsall	Wolverhampton
19:45	McAlinden 5'; Sako 63'	Report	Hemmings 54'; Hewitt 85'	Stadium: Molineux; Attendance: 13,481; Referee: Darren Deadman
	Penalties
	Sigurðarson (penalty scored); Sako (penalty scored); Doherty (penalty scored); Davis (penalty scored)		(penalty missed) Westcarr; (penalty missed) Taylor; (penalty scored) Mantom; (penalty scored) Downing

== First-team squad ==
Squad at end of season

Note: Flags indicate national team as defined under FIFA eligibility rules; some limited exceptions apply. Players may hold more than one non-FIFA nationality.

No.	Pos.	Nation	Player
1	GK	ENG	Richard O'Donnell
2	DF	ENG	Ben Purkiss
3	DF	ENG	Andy Taylor
4	DF	ENG	Andy Butler
5	DF	NIR	Dean Holden
6	MF	ENG	Nicky Featherstone
7	MF	ENG	Adam Chambers
8	MF	ENG	Sam Mantom
9	FW	SVK	Milan Lalkovič (on loan from Chelsea)
10	FW	ENG	Craig Westcarr
11	MF	ENG	Ashley Hemmings
12	DF	ENG	Paul Downing
13	GK	ENG	Shane Lewis
14	DF	ENG	Mal Benning
15	DF	ENG	James Chambers

No.	Pos.	Nation	Player
16	MF	ENG	James Baxendale
17	MF	ENG	Reece Flanagan
18	DF	ENG	Ben George
19	FW	ENG	Jake Heath
20	DF	ENG	Matt Preston
21	MF	ENG	Kieron Morris
22	GK	ENG	Liam Roberts
23	FW	ENG	Danny Griffiths
24	FW	ENG	Troy Hewitt
25	MF	SKN	Romaine Sawyers
26	MF	NIR	James McQuilkin
27	FW	SLE	Amadou Bakayoko
29	FW	ENG	Febian Brandy (on loan from Sheffield United)
30	FW	ENG	Michael Ngoo (on loan from Liverpool)

=== Left club during season ===
Note: Flags indicate national team as defined under FIFA eligibility rules; some limited exceptions apply. Players may hold more than one non-FIFA nationality.

No.	Pos.	Nation	Player
27	MF	ENG	Julian Gray (released)

== Squad statistics ==
Numbers in parentheses denote appearances as substitute.
Players with squad numbers struck through and marked † left the club during the playing season.
Players with names in italics and marked * were on loan from another club for the whole of their season with Walsall.
Players listed with no appearances have been in the matchday squad but only as unused substitutes.
Key to positions: GK – Goalkeeper; DF – Defender; MF – Midfielder; FW – Forward

No.	Pos.	Nat.	Name	Apps	Goals	Apps	Goals	Apps	Goals	Apps	Goals	Apps	Goals	Yellow card	Red card
No.	Pos.	Nat.	Name	League		FA Cup		League Cup		FL Trophy		Total		Discipline	
1	GK	ENG	Richard O'Donnell	46	0	2	0	2	0	1	0	51	0	2	0
2	DF	ENG	Ben Purkiss	10 (4)	0	1 (1)	0	0	0	0	0	11 (5)	0	3	1
3	DF	ENG	Andy Taylor	32 (1)	1	2	0	1	0	1	0	36 (1)	1	6	0
4	DF	ENG	Andy Butler	45	2	2	0	2	0	1	0	50	2	3	2
5	DF	ENG	Dean Holden	0	0	0	0	0	0	0	0	0	0	0	0
6	MF	ENG	Nicky Featherstone	10 (15)	0	1	0	1 (1)	0	1	0	13 (16)	0	1	0
7	MF	ENG	Adam Chambers	45	0	2	0	1	0	1	0	49	0	7	0
8	MF	ENG	Sam Mantom	43	5	2	0	2	0	1	0	48	5	3	1
9	MF	SVK	Milan Lalkovič *	30 (8)	6	2	0	1	0	1	0	34 (8)	6	4	0
10	FW	ENG	Craig Westcarr	40 (3)	14	2	2	2	1	0 (1)	0	44 (4)	17	1	1
11	FW	ENG	Ashley Hemmings	14 (13)	2	1 (1)	0	2	1	1	1	18 (14)	4	1	0
12	DF	ENG	Paul Downing	43 (1)	1	2	0	2	0	1	0	48 (1)	1	5	0
13	GK	ENG	Shane Lewis	0	0	0	0	0	0	0	0	0	0	0	0
14	DF	ENG	Mal Benning	14 (2)	2	0 (1)	0	1	0	0	0	15 (3)	2	3	0
15	DF	ENG	James Chambers	40	1	1	0	2	0	1	0	44	1	4	0
16	MF	ENG	James Baxendale	25 (15)	2	1 (1)	0	2	1	1	0	29 (16)	3	0	0
17	MF	ENG	Reece Flanagan	0	0	0	0	0	0	0	0	0	0	0	0
18	DF	ENG	Ben George	0	0	0	0	0	0	0	0	0	0	0	0
21	MF	ENG	Kieron Morris	1 (1)	0	0	0	0 (1)	0	0	0	1 (2)	0	0	0
22	GK	ENG	Liam Roberts	0	0	0	0	0	0	0	0	0	0	0	0
24	FW	ENG	Troy Hewitt	8 (19)	0	0 (1)	0	0 (1)	0	0 (1)	1	8 (22)	1	0	0
25	MF	SKN	Romaine Sawyers	29 (15)	6	1 (1)	1	1 (1)	0	1	0	32 (17)	7	2	0
26	MF	NIR	James McQuilkin	2 (7)	0	0	0	0 (1)	0	0	0	2 (8)	0	0	0
~~27~~ †	MF	ENG	Julian Gray	0 (12)	1	0	0	0	0	0	0	0 (12)	1	0	0
27	FW	SLE	Amadou Bakayoko	0 (6)	0	0	0	0	0	0	0	0 (6)	0	0	0
29	FW	ENG	Febian Brandy *	20	4	0	0	0	0	0	0	20	4	0	0
30	FW	ENG	Michael Ngoo *	4 (10)	1	0	0	0	0	0	0	4 (10)	1	2	0

Players not included in matchday squads
No.	Pos.	Nat.	Name
19	MF	ENG	Jake Heath
20	DF	ENG	Matt Preston
23	FW	ENG	Danny Griffiths
