= 2014–15 Walsall F.C. season =

Walsall F.C.
2014–15 season
- Chairman: Jeff Bonser
- Manager: Dean Smith
- Stadium: Bescot Stadium
- League One: 14th
- FA Cup: First round (knocked out by Shrewsbury Town)
- League Cup: Second round (knocked out by Crystal Palace)
- League Trophy: Runners-up
- Top goalscorer: League: Tom Bradshaw (17); All: Tom Bradshaw (20)
| Home colours | Away colours |

The 2014–15 campaign was an historic season for Walsall, with the club making its first ever appearance at Wembley in the final of the Football League Trophy. The Saddlers’ league form was less impressive, ending the season with a 14th place finish.

== The road to Wembley ==
Having received a bye to the Northern section second round, Walsall started their Football League Trophy campaign with a trip to Rochdale. Despite having been beaten 4–0 in the corresponding league fixture a few weeks earlier, the Saddlers won 1–0 with a goal from French striker Mathieu Manset, his only goal for the club.

The quarter finals saw Sheffield United defeated by the same scoreline courtesy of a Romaine Sawyers goal. Travelling to Tranmere for the semi-final, the Saddlers trailed 2–0 before hitting back to draw 2–2 and win on penalties.

That set up a Northern section final with Preston North End. An inspired goalkeeping performance from Richard O'Donnell and late goals from Anthony Forde and Tom Bradshaw secured a 2–0 away win in the first leg. A goalless draw back at the Bescot was enough to confirm Walsall’s first appearance at Wembley in the club’s 127-year history, prompting wild celebrations from fans and players alike.

The Saddlers would face runaway League One leaders Bristol City in the final, with the clash generating major excitement in the town. More than 30,000 Walsall fans made the trip to London, forming part of a crowd over 72,000 strong. However, the Saddlers were comfortably beaten on the day suffering a 2–0 defeat.

== The league season ==
Major moves in the summer transfer market saw the departure of captain and fan favourite Andy Butler who left for Sheffield United, while top scorer Craig Westcarr was surprisingly released. Incomings included defender James O’Connor and attackers Tom Bradshaw and Jordan Cook.

The season got off to a poor start with the club failing to win any of its first six league fixtures. A first three points of the season was finally achieved with a 3–1 win over Preston, with Butler surprisingly returning to the club on a one-month loan deal to cover a defensive injury crisis.

However, the Saddlers continued to struggle with a 1–0 defeat to Crawley in October meaning the club had won just four of its last 32 league fixtures stretching back to January 2014. Despite this poor form, the club stuck with manager Dean Smith, who followed the Crawley loss with a seven game unbeaten run and progress in the Football League Trophy.

The form of Bradshaw was a major plus-point, with the young striker hitting 15 goals in his first 22 games for the club. Otherwise, Walsall struggled for goals and a run of just one win in 12 games between January and March left the Saddlers two points above the relegation zone with six games left to play.

However, three wins in the next five games ensured survival was achieved comfortably. Importantly, Bradshaw regained his early season form, hitting four goals after enduring a seven-game drought.

The season ended on a sour note with an 8–2 thrashing away at champions Bristol City. That left the Saddlers in 14th, ten points off the playoffs and nine clear of relegation. It was a low scoring season for the club, managing only 50 goals in 46 league games.

== Match details ==
=== Pre-season ===
| 11 July 2014 | Wigan Athletic | 0–0 | Walsall | Manchester |
| 15:00 BST | | Report | | Stadium: Leigh Sports Village |

| 19 July 2014 | Torquay United | 2–1 | Walsall | Torquay |
| 15:00 BST | Yeoman 30'; Bowman 44' | Report | Bakayoko 89' | Stadium: Plainmoor |

| 30 July 2014 | Walsall | 2–3 | Leicester City | Bescot |
| 19:30 BST | Trialist 45'; Grimes 49' | Report | Morgan 7'; Nugent 26'; Drinkwater 87' | Stadium: Bescot Stadium; Attendance: 2,119 |

| 2 August 2014 | Mansfield Town | 0–0 | Walsall | Mansfield |
| 15:00 BST | | Report | | Stadium: Field Mill |

| 5 August 2014 | Walsall | 0–1 | Aston Villa | Bescot |
| 19:30 BST | | Report | Hutton 28' | Stadium: Bescot Stadium; Attendance: 6,559 |

=== League One ===
==== League table ====
| Pos | Team | Pld | W | D | L | GF | GA | GD | Pts |
|---|---|---|---|---|---|---|---|---|---|
| 12 | Gillingham | 46 | 16 | 14 | 16 | 65 | 66 | −1 | 62 |
| 13 | Doncaster Rovers | 46 | 16 | 13 | 17 | 58 | 62 | −4 | 61 |
| 14 | Walsall | 46 | 14 | 17 | 15 | 50 | 54 | −4 | 59 |
| 15 | Oldham Athletic | 46 | 14 | 15 | 17 | 54 | 67 | −13 | 57 |
| 16 | Scunthorpe United | 46 | 14 | 14 | 18 | 62 | 75 | −13 | 56 |

Updated to match(es) played on 3 May 2015. Source: BBC Sport
Rules for classification: 1) Points; 2) Goal difference; 3) Number of goals scored

==== Matches ====
The fixtures for the 2014–15 season were announced on 18 June 2014 at 9am.

| 9 August 2014 1 | Port Vale | 1–1 | Walsall | Stoke-on-Trent |
| 15:00 | Pope 25' | Report | Bradshaw 59' | Stadium: Vale Park; Attendance: 7,050; Referee: Darren Bond |

| 16 August 2014 2 | Walsall | 0–0 | Bradford City | Walsall |
| 16:00 | | | | Stadium: Bescot Stadium; Referee: Dean Whitestone |

| 19 August 2014 3 | Walsall | 1–2 | Yeovil Town | Walsall |
| 19:45 | Liam Kinsella (yellow card) 55'; Grimes (yellow card) 60'; Bradshaw 72' | Report | Hayter 56'; Sokolík (yellow card) 65'; Dawson 73'; Smith (yellow card) 78'; Foley (yellow card) 86'; Nugent (yellow card) 90+5' | Stadium: Bescot Stadium; Attendance: 3,758; Referee: Jeremy Simpson |

| 23 August 2014 4 | Leyton Orient | 0–0 | Walsall | Leyton |
| 15:00 | | Report | | Stadium: Brisbane Road; Attendance: 4,400; Referee: David Webb |

| 30 August 2014 5 | Scunthorpe United | 2–1 | Walsall | Scunthorpe |
| 15:00 | Adelakun 51'; McSheffrey 54' | Report | Bradshaw 70' | Stadium: Glanford Park; Attendance: 3,098; Referee: Andy Davies |

| 6 September 2014 6 | Walsall | 0–0 | Colchester United | Walsall |
| 15:00 | | | | Stadium: Bescot Stadium; Attendance: 4,009; Referee: Pat Miller |

| 13 September 2014 7 | Walsall | 3–1 | Preston North End | Walsall |
| 15:00 | Sawyers 7'; Bradshaw 49'; Downing 76' | Report | Garner 36'; Hugill (red card) 69' | Stadium: Bescot Stadium; Attendance: 4,776; Referee: Geoff Eltringham |

| 16 September 2014 8 | Rochdale | 4–0 | Walsall | Rochdale |
| 19:45 | Done 5'; Eastham 30'; Henderson 37'; Butler 71' (o.g.) | Report | | Stadium: Spotland Stadium; Attendance: 2,082; Referee: Andy Madley |

| 20 September 2014 9 | Gillingham | 0–0 | Walsall | Gillingham |
| 15:00 | | | Butler (yellow card) 66' | Stadium: Priestfield Stadium; Attendance: 5,344; Referee: James Adcock |

| 27 September 2014 10 | Walsall | 3–0 | Doncaster Rovers | Walsall |
| 15:00 | Baxendale 45+3'; Bradshaw 57'; Forde 64'; O'Connor (yellow card) 77' | Report | Evina (yellow card) 27'; Furman (yellow card) 76' | Stadium: Bescot Stadium; Attendance: 3,741; Referee: Scott Mathieson |

| 4 October 2014 11 | Walsall | 1–1 | Bristol City | Walsall |
| 15:00 | Downing (yellow card) 40'; Sawyers 85' | Report | Bryan 11'; Agard (yellow card) 21' | Stadium: Bescot Stadium; Attendance: 5,574; Referee: Keith Hill |

| 11 October 2014 12 | Oldham Athletic | 2–1 | Walsall | Oldham |
| 15:00 | Wilkinson 31'; Jones 75' | Report | Cook 10' (yellow card) 66'; Butler | Stadium: Boundary Park; Attendance: 4,178; Referee: Carl Boyeson |

| 18 October 2014 13 | Walsall | 0–1 | Crewe Alexandra | Walsall |
| 15:00 | | Report | Cooper (yellow card) 56'; Turton (yellow card) 70'; Dugdale 84' | Stadium: Bescot Stadium; Attendance: 4,127; Referee: Darren Handley |

| 21 October 2014 14 | Crawley Town | 1–0 | Walsall | Crawley |
| 19:45 | Oyebanjo (yellow card) 26'; Leacock (yellow card) 73'; Elliott (yellow card) 86'; Henderson 89' | Report | Baxendale (yellow card) 45+2'; Chambers (yellow card) 88' | Stadium: Broadfield Stadium; Attendance: 2,204; Referee: Keith Stroud |

| 25 October 2014 15 | Walsall | 1–0 | Chesterfield | Walsall |
| 15:00 | Bradshaw 61' | Report | Darikwa (yellow card) 77'; Evatt (yellow card) 89' | Stadium: Bescot Stadium; Attendance: 4,230; Referee: Kevin Wright |

| 1 November 2014 16 | Notts County | 1–2 | Walsall | Nottingham |
| 15:00 | Thompson 31'; Hollis (yellow card) 63' | Report | Jones 16' (o.g.); Bradshaw 64' (pen.); Downing (yellow card) 80' | Stadium: Meadow Lane; Attendance: 5,884; Referee: Simon Hooper |

| 15 November 2014 17 | Walsall | 0–0 | Peterborough United | Walsall |
| 15:00 | Cook (yellow card) 52'; Sawyers (yellow card) 53' | Report | Taylor (yellow card) 17'; Newell (yellow card) 53'; Burgess (yellow card) 67' | Stadium: Bescot Stadium; Attendance: 5,495; Referee: Peter Bankes |

| 22 November 2014 18 | Fleetwood Town | 0–1 | Walsall | Fleetwood |
| 15:00 | McLaughlin (yellow card) 48' | Report | Sawyers 35' | Stadium: Highbury Stadium; Attendance: 3,224; Referee: Mark Haywood |

| 29 November 2014 19 | Coventry City | 0–0 | Walsall | Coventry |
| 15:00 | Finch (yellow card) 90+2' | Report | | Stadium: Ricoh Arena; Attendance: 8,076; Referee: Richard Clark |

| 13 December 2014 20 | Walsall | 3–1 | Barnsley | Walsall |
| 15:00 | Bradshaw (yellow card) 10' (goal) 34'; Cook 31', 90+4' | Report | Nyatanga 29'; Abbott (yellow card) 48'; Cranie (yellow card) 74'; Berry (yellow card) 90+3' | Stadium: Bescot Stadium; Attendance: 4,433; Referee: Trevor Kettle |

| 20 December 2014 21 | Sheffield United | 1–1 | Walsall | Sheffield |
| 15:00 | O'Grady 56' | Report | Chambers (yellow card) 41'; Bradshaw 59' | Stadium: Bramall Lane; Attendance: 20,209; Referee: Graham Horwood |

| 26 December 2014 22 | Walsall | 1–4 | Swindon Town | Walsall |
| 15:00 | Bradshaw 18'; Chambers (yellow card) 35'; Purkiss (yellow card) 60' | Report | Smith 3'; Luongo (yellow card) 24' (goal) 46'; Williams 51', 57' | Stadium: Bescot Stadium; Attendance: 5,696; Referee: David Webb |

| 28 December 2014 23 | Milton Keynes Dons | 0–3 | Walsall | Milton Keynes |
| 15:00 | Martin (yellow card) 62' | Report | Potter 4' (o.g.); Bradshaw 62', 77' | Stadium: Stadium mk Attendance: 9,311; Referee: Carl Berry |

| 3 January 2015 24 | Walsall | 0–2 | Coventry City | Walsall |
| 15:00 | | Report | O'Brien 6'; Thomas (yellow card) 73'; Tudgay 87' | Stadium: Bescot Stadium; Attendance: 5,930; Referee: Carl Boyeson |

| 10 January 2015 25 | Walsall | 1–4 | Scunthorpe United | Walsall |
| 15:00 | Taylor (yellow card) 30'; Chambers (yellow card) 37'; Cain 51' | Report | Boyce (yellow card) 12'; Chambers 24' (o.g.); Hopper 39'; Madden 63' (pen.); Bishop 65' | Stadium: Bescot Stadium; Attendance: 3,738; Referee: Lee Collins |

| 17 January 2015 26 | Colchester United | 0–2 | Walsall | Colchester |
| 15:00 | Clohessy (yellow card) 37' | Report | Forde 33'; Cain 75'; Taylor (yellow card) 81' | Stadium: Colchester Community Stadium; Attendance: 2,980; Referee: Brendan Malone |

| 1 February 2015 27 | Walsall | 1–1 | Gillingham | Walsall |
| 18:00 | Chambers (yellow card) 17'; Grimes 74' | Report | Hoyte (yellow card) 10'; Pritchard (yellow card) 41'; Dack 69'; McDonald (yellow card) 71'; Loft (yellow card) 74'; Ehmer (yellow card) 86' | Stadium: Bescot Stadium; Attendance: 3,951; Referee: Carl Berry |

| 7 February 2015 28 | Doncaster Rovers | 0–2 | Walsall | Doncaster |
| 15:00 GMT | Keegan (yellow card) 69'; Butler (yellow card) 79' | Report | Cook 3' (yellow card) 9'; Taylor (yellow card) 68'; Hiwula-Mayifuila 70' | Stadium: Keepmoat Stadium; Attendance: 6,089; Referee: Graham Scott |

| 10 February 2015 29 | Walsall | 3–2 | Rochdale | Walsall |
| 19:45 GMT | O'Connor 13'; Forde 19'; Hiwula-Mayifuila 22' | Report | Vincenti 55'; Eastham 63' | Stadium: Bescot Stadium; Attendance: 3,567; Referee: Steve Martin |

| 14 February 2015 30 | Walsall | 0–1 | Port Vale | Walsall |
| 15:00 GMT | Taylor (yellow card) 53'; Downing (yellow card) 66' | Report | Pope 28' (yellow card) 89'; Inniss (yellow card) 71' | Stadium: Bescot Stadium; Attendance: 4,504; Referee: Andy D'Urso |

| 21 February 2015 31 | Bradford City | 1–1 | Walsall | Bradford |
| 15:00 GMT | Clarke 51' | Report | Hiwula-Mayifuila 74' (yellow card) 80' | Stadium: Valley Parade; Attendance: 13,534; Referee: Tim Robinson |

| 24 February 2015 32 | Preston North End | 1–0 | Walsall | Preston |
| 19:45 GMT | Johnson 18' | Report | | Stadium: Deepdale; Attendance: 7,779; Referee: Darren Drysdale |

| 28 February 2015 33 | Walsall | 0–2 | Leyton Orient | Walsall |
| 15:00 GMT | Purkiss (yellow card) 56' | Report | Hedges 56'; Dagnall 59' | Stadium: Bescot Stadium; Attendance: 5,239; Referee: (England) Eddie Ilderton |

| 3 March 2015 34 | Yeovil Town | 0–1 | Walsall | Yeovil |
| 19:45 GMT | Davis (yellow card) 45+1'; Sheehan (yellow card) 70'; Moore (yellow card) 75' | Report | Hiwula 32'; Downing (yellow card) 60'; Purkiss (yellow card) 71'; Baxendale (yellow card) 76' | Stadium: Huish Park; Attendance: 3,668; Referee: (England) Charles Breakspear |

| 7 March 2015 35 | Barnsley | 3–0 | Walsall | Barnsley |
| 15:00 GMT | Waring 15' 71'; Winnall 89' | Report | Taylor (yellow card) 86' | Stadium: Oakwell; Attendance: 9,275; Referee: (England) Stuart Attwell |

| 14 March 2015 36 | Walsall | 1–1 | Milton Keynes Dons | Walsall |
| 15:00 GMT | Bradshaw 8'; Chambers (yellow card) 65' | Report | Potter (yellow card) 26'; Grigg 32'; McFadzean (yellow card) 73' | Stadium: Bescot Stadium; Attendance: 3,887; Referee: (England) Seb Stockbridge |

| 17 March 2015 37 | Walsall | 1–1 | Sheffield United | Walsall |
| 19:45 GMT | Hiwula (yellow card) 45+2'; Grimes 71'; Bakayoko (yellow card) 88' | Report | Baxter 8'; Doyle (yellow card) 45+3' | Stadium: Bescot Stadium; Attendance: 3,950; Referee: (England) Rob Lewis |

| 28 March 2015 38 | Chesterfield | 1–0 | Walsall | Chesterfield |
| 15:00 GMT | Ryan (yellow card) 52'; Hird 86' | Report | | Stadium: Proact Stadium; Attendance: 6,358; Referee: (England) Kevin Friend |

| 3 April 2015 39 | Walsall | 0–0 | Notts County | Walsall |
| 15:00 GMT | | Report | | Stadium: Bescot Stadium; Attendance: 4,353; Referee: (England) Graham Horwood |

| 6 April 2015 40 | Peterborough United | 0–0 | Walsall | Peterborough |
| 15:00 GMT | Bostwick (yellow card) 49' | Report | O'Connor (yellow card) 66' | Stadium: London Road Stadium; Attendance: 6,711; Referee: (England) Darren Handley |

| 11 April 2015 41 | Walsall | 1–0 | Fleetwood Town | Walsall |
| 15:00 GMT | Cook (yellow card) 9'; Bradshaw 86' | Report | | Stadium: Bescot Stadium; Attendance: 3,534; Referee: (England) Andy Haines |

| 14 April 2015 42 | Walsall | 5–0 | Crawley Town | Walsall |
| 19:45 GMT | Hiwula 16' 65'; Morris 67'; Taylor 81'; Cook 90' | Report | Fowler (yellow card) 70' | Stadium: Bescot Stadium; Attendance: 3,296; Referee: (England) Mike Bull |

| 18 April 2015 43 | Crewe Alexandra | 1–1 | Walsall | Crewe |
| 15:00 GMT | Haber 13' | Report | Bradshaw 81' | Stadium: Gresty Road; Attendance: 4,644; Referee: (England) Scott Duncan |

| 21 April 2015 44 | Swindon Town | 3–3 | Walsall | Swindon |
| 19:45 GMT | Gladwin 59' (pen.) 67' (pen.); Turnbull 81' | Report | Morris 18'; Hiwula 53'; Sawyers 74'; Forde (yellow card) 80' | Stadium: County Ground; Attendance: 6,305; Referee: (England) Iain Williamson |

| 25 April 2015 45 | Walsall | 2–0 | Oldham Athletic | Walsall |
| 15:00 GMT | Bradshaw 18' 24' (pen.) | Report | | Stadium: Bescot Stadium; Attendance: 4,699; Referee: (England) Darren Sheldrake |

| 3 May 2015 46 | Bristol City | 8–2 | Walsall | Bristol |
| 12:15 GMT | Flint 16' 67' 86'; Emmanuel-Thomas 22' (pen.) 63'; Agard 57' 90+1'; Pack 62' | Report | Hiwula 13' 36'; Chambers (yellow card) 72'; Downing (yellow card) 90' | Stadium: Ashton Gate; Attendance: 11,960; Referee: (England) Paul Tierney (referee) |

=== FA Cup ===
The draw for the first round of the FA Cup was made on 27 October 2014.

| 8 November 2014 First round | Walsall | 2–2 | Shrewsbury Town | Walsall |
| 15:00 | Bradshaw 56', 90'; Manset (yellow card) 90+4' | Report | Ellis 5'; Woods (yellow card) 43'; Collins 61'; Mangan (yellow card) 64'; Lawrence (yellow card) 83'; Halstead (yellow card) 84'; Goldson (yellow card) 90' | Stadium: Bescot Stadium; Attendance: 3,546; Referee: Darren Deadman |

| 18 November 2014 First round replay | Shrewsbury Town | 1–0 | Walsall | Shrewsbury |
| 19:45 | Lawrence 53'; Akpa Akpro (yellow card) 65'; Knight-Percival (yellow card) 90'; Woods (yellow card) 90+1' | Report | Grimes (yellow card) 82'; Chambers (red card) 83' | Stadium: Greenhous Meadow; Attendance: 4,222; Referee: Gavin Ward |

=== League Cup ===
The draw for the first round was made on 17 June 2014 at 10am. Walsall were drawn away to Southend United.

| 12 August 2014 Round One | Southend United | 1–2 | Walsall | Southend |
| 19:45 | Leonard 68' | Report | Benning 25'; Morris 87' | Stadium: Roots Hall; Attendance: 3,146; Referee: Gavin Ward |

| 26 August 2014 Round Two | Walsall | 0–3 | Crystal Palace | Walsall |
| 19:45 | | Report | Gayle 7', 25', 41' | Stadium: Bescot Stadium; Attendance: 3,987; Referee: Darren Drysdale |

=== Football League Trophy ===
| 7 October 2014 Round Two | Rochdale | 0–1 | Walsall | Rochdale |
| 19:45 | Henderson (yellow card) 90+4' | Report | Manset 23'; Grimes (yellow card) 45'; Purkiss (yellow card) 72' | Stadium: Spotland Stadium; Attendance: 1,156; Referee: Mark Heywood |

| 12 November 2014 Round Three | Walsall | 1–0 | Sheffield United | Walsall |
| 19:45 | Cain (yellow card) 21'; Sawyers 55' | BBC Report | McGahey (yellow card) 19'; Harris (yellow card) 24' | Stadium: Bescot Stadium; Attendance: 2,127; Referee: David Coote |

| 10 December 2014 Area S-Final | Tranmere Rovers | 2–2 (4–5 p) | Walsall | Tranmere |
| 19:45 | Power 37'; Odejayi 43' | Report | Forde 63'; Cain 80' | Stadium: Prenton Park; Attendance: 2,355; Referee: Geoff Eltringham |
| | Penalties |
| | Power (penalty scored); Holmes (penalty scored); Ihiekwe (penalty scored); Jennings (penalty scored); Ridehalgh (penalty missed); Laird (penalty missed) | | Bradshaw (penalty scored); Sawyers (penalty scored); Grimes (penalty missed); Forde (penalty scored); Manset (penalty scored); Downing (penalty scored) |

| 7 January 2015 Area Final L1 | Preston North End | 0–2 | Walsall | Preston |
| 19:45 GMT | Kilkenny (yellow card) 84' | Report | O'Connor (yellow card) 66'; Forde 84'; Bradshaw 88' | Stadium: Deepdale; Attendance: 8,561; Referee: Simon Hooper |

| 27 January 2015 Area Final L2 | Walsall | 0–0 (2–0 agg.) | Preston North End | Walsall |
| 19:45 GMT | Chambers (yellow card) 56'; O'Donnell (yellow card) 71'; Cain (yellow card) 72' | Report | Clarke (yellow card) 64' | Stadium: Bescot Stadium; Attendance: 10,038; Referee: Nigel Miller |

| 22 March 2015 Final | Bristol City | 2–0 | Walsall | London |
| 15:30 GMT | Flint 14'; Little 51' | Report | Sawyers (yellow card) 38' | Stadium: Wembley Stadium; Attendance: 72,315; Referee: (England) Mike Russell |

== Transfers ==
=== In ===
| No. | Pos. | Nat. | Name | Age | EU | Moving from | Type | Transfer window | Ends | Transfer fee | Source |
|---|---|---|---|---|---|---|---|---|---|---|---|
| 13 | GK | (England) | Craig MacGillivray | 21 | EU | Harrogate Town | Transfer | Summer | 2015 | Undisclosed | |
| 4 | DF | (England) | James O'Connor | 29 | EU | Derby County | Free Transfer | Summer | 2015 | Free | |
| 9 | FW | (Wales) | Tom Bradshaw | 21 | EU | Shrewsbury Town | Transfer | Summer | 2016 | Undisclosed | |
| 21 | FW | (England) | Jordan Cook | 24 | EU | Charlton Athletic | Free Transfer | Summer | 2016 | Free | |
| 24 | FW | (England) | Ashley Grimes | 27 | EU | Bury | Free Transfer | Summer | 2015 | Free | |
| 26 | MF | (England) | Billy Clifford | 21 | EU | Chelsea | Free Transfer | Summer | 2015 | Free | |
| 27 | MF | (Republic of Ireland) | Anthony Forde | 20 | EU | Wolverhampton Wanderers | Transfer | Summer | 2016 | Undisclosed | |
| 37 | FW | (France) | Mathieu Manset | 25 | EU | Antwerp (Belgium) | Free Transfer | Summer | 2015 | Free | |
| — | FW | (England) | Jordan Murphy | 18 | EU | Stourbridge | Transfer | Summer | 2015 | Undisclosed | |

=== Out ===
| No. | Pos. | Nat. | Name | Age | EU | Moving to | Type | Transfer window | Transfer fee | Source |
|---|---|---|---|---|---|---|---|---|---|---|
| 4 | DF | (England) | Andy Butler | 30 | EU | Sheffield United | Released | Summer | Free | |
| 6 | MF | (England) | Nicky Featherstone | 25 | EU | Scunthorpe United | Released | Summer | Free | |
| 18 | DF | (England) | Ben George | 20 | EU | Free agent | Released | Summer | Free | |
| 23 | FW | (England) | Danny Griffiths | 19 | EU | Cefn Druids (Wales) | Released | Summer | Free | |
| 11 | FW | (England) | Ashley Hemmings | 23 | EU | Dagenham & Redbridge | Released | Summer | Free | |
| 24 | FW | (England) | Troy Hewitt | 24 | EU | Free agent | Released | Summer | Free | |
| 13 | GK | (England) | Shane Lewis | 19 | EU | Free agent | Released | Summer | Free | |
| 26 | MF | (Northern Ireland) | James McQuilkin | 25 | EU | Torquay United | Released | Summer | Free | |
| 10 | FW | (England) | Craig Westcarr | 29 | EU | Portsmouth | Released | Summer | Free | |
| 37 | FW | (France) | Mathieu Manset | 25 | EU | Cheltenham Town | Released | Winter | Free | |

EU = if holds or not a European Union passport; Country: when 2 flags, 1st flag = country that plays for internationally, 2nd flag = country of birth; N = number on jersey; P = Position (for position name, pause mouse pointer on abbreviation); Name = Name on jersey (for more extensive name, pause mouse pointer on name); Age = age on the day of the signing; Moving from = only indicate the club the player was playing before start playing for this club in this season, for the type of the moving see Status column; Moving to = only indicates the club the player is going to play next, for the type of the moving see Status column; Ends = when the player's current contract ends; n/a = Not applicable.

=== Loans in ===
| No. | Pos. | Name | Country | Age | Loan club | Started | Ended | Start source | End source |
|---|---|---|---|---|---|---|---|---|---|
| 44 | DF | Andy Butler | (England) | 28 | Sheffield United | 11 September 2014 | 20 October 2014 | | |
| 12 | MF | Michael Cain | (England) | 19 | Leicester City | 20 October 2014 | 30 June 2015 | | |
| 30 | FW | Jordy Hiwula | (England) | 20 | Manchester City | 2 February 2015 | 4 April 2015 | | |

Sources: For loan start source see "Start source". For loan end source see "End source".
EU = if holds or not a European Union passport; Country: when 2 flags, 1st flag = country that plays for internationally, 2nd flag = country of birth; No. = number on jersey; P = Position (for position name, pause mouse pointer on abbreviation); Name = Name on jersey (for more extensive name, pause mouse pointer on name); In/Out = In: The player came in on loan, Out: The player went out on loan; Loan club = the club that the player moved on loan to or the club that the player came from on loan; Started = the date when the player's loan started; Ended = the date when the player's loan ended.

=== Loans out ===
| No. | Pos. | Name | Country | Age | Loan club | Started | Ended | Start source | End source |
|---|---|---|---|---|---|---|---|---|---|
| 22 | GK | Liam Roberts | (England) | 19 | Rushall Olympic | 25 July 2014 | October 2014 | | |
| 19 | FW | Jake Heath | (England) | 19 | Rushall Olympic | 8 August 2014 | 5 September 2014 | | |
| 20 | FW | Amadou Bakayoko | (England) | 18 | Southport | 10 October 2014 | 20 December 2014 | | |
| 22 | GK | Liam Roberts | (England) | 20 | Southport | 27 November 2014 | 5 January 2015 | | |
| 14 | DF | Mal Benning | (England) | 21 | York City | 22 January 2015 | 19 February 2015 | | |

Sources: For loan start source see "Start source". For loan end source see "End source".
EU = if holds or not a European Union passport; Country: when 2 flags, 1st flag = country that plays for internationally, 2nd flag = country of birth; No. = number on jersey; P = Position (for position name, pause mouse pointer on abbreviation); Name = Name on jersey (for more extensive name, pause mouse pointer on name); In/Out = In: The player came in on loan, Out: The player went out on loan; Loan club = the club that the player moved on loan to or the club that the player came from on loan; Started = the date when the player's loan started; Ended = the date when the player's loan ended.

== Squad statistics ==
Numbers in parentheses denote appearances as substitute.
Players with squad numbers struck through and marked † left the club during the playing season.
Players with names in italics and marked * were on loan from another club for the whole of their season with Walsall.
Players listed with no appearances have been in the matchday squad but only as unused substitutes.
Key to positions: GK – Goalkeeper; DF – Defender; MF – Midfielder; FW – Forward

| No. | Pos. | Nat. | Name | Apps | Goals | Apps | Goals | Apps | Goals | Apps | Goals | Apps | Goals | Yellow card | Red card |
| No. | Pos. | Nat. | Name | League | | FA Cup | | League Cup | | FL Trophy | | Total | | Discipline | |
|---|---|---|---|---|---|---|---|---|---|---|---|---|---|---|---|
| 1 | GK | ENG | Richard O'Donnell | 44 | 0 | 2 | 0 | 2 | 0 | 6 | 0 | 54 | 0 | 2 | 0 |
| 2 | DF | ENG | Ben Purkiss | 31 (1) | 0 | 2 | 0 | 0 | 0 | 4 (1) | 0 | 37 (2) | 0 | 4 | 0 |
| 3 | DF | ENG | Andy Taylor | 37 (2) | 1 | 2 | 0 | 2 | 0 | 5 | 0 | 46 (2) | 1 | 5 | 0 |
| 4 | DF | ENG | James O'Connor | 30 (2) | 1 | 0 | 0 | 1 | 0 | 2 | 0 | 33 (2) | 1 | 3 | 0 |
| ~~5~~ † | DF | ENG | Dean Holden | 2 (2) | 0 | 0 | 0 | 1 | 0 | 0 | 0 | 3 (2) | 0 | 0 | 0 |
| 6 | DF | ENG | Paul Downing | 33 (2) | 1 | 2 | 0 | 2 | 0 | 6 | 0 | 43 (2) | 1 | 6 | 0 |
| 7 | MF | ENG | Adam Chambers | 45 | 0 | 2 | 0 | 2 | 0 | 6 | 0 | 55 | 0 | 9 | 1 |
| 8 | MF | ENG | Sam Mantom | 6 (6) | 0 | 0 (1) | 0 | 0 | 0 | 1 (1) | 0 | 7 (8) | 0 | 0 | 0 |
| 9 | FW | WAL | Tom Bradshaw | 29 | 17 | 1 | 2 | 2 | 0 | 5 | 1 | 37 | 20 | 3 | 0 |
| 10 | MF | SKN | Romaine Sawyers | 37 (5) | 4 | 2 | 0 | 2 | 0 | 5 | 1 | 46 (5) | 5 | 3 | 0 |
| 11 | MF | ENG | James Baxendale | 17 (11) | 1 | 1 (1) | 0 | 1 (1) | 0 | 2 (3) | 0 | 21 (16) | 1 | 3 | 0 |
| 12 | MF | ENG | Michael Cain * | 28 (4) | 2 | 2 | 0 | 0 | 0 | 4 | 1 | 34 (4) | 3 | 2 | 0 |
| 13 | GK | ENG | Craig MacGillivray | 2 | 0 | 0 | 0 | 0 | 0 | 0 | 0 | 2 | 0 | 0 | 0 |
| 14 | DF | ENG | Mal Benning | 11 (9) | 0 | 0 (1) | 0 | 1 (1) | 1 | 1 | 0 | 13 (11) | 1 | 1 | 0 |
| 15 | DF | ENG | James Chambers | 31 | 0 | 2 | 0 | 1 | 0 | 6 | 0 | 40 | 0 | 1 | 0 |
| 16 | DF | ENG | Matt Preston | 0 (1) | 0 | 0 | 0 | 0 | 0 | 0 | 0 | 0 (1) | 0 | 0 | 0 |
| 17 | MF | ENG | Reece Flanagan | 9 (7) | 0 | 0 | 0 | 0 (1) | 0 | 0 (1) | 0 | 9 (9) | 0 | 0 | 0 |
| 18 | MF | ENG | Kieron Morris | 9 (5) | 2 | 0 | 0 | 0 (1) | 1 | 0 | 0 | 9 (6) | 3 | 0 | 0 |
| 20 | FW | SLE | Amadou Bakayoko | 0 (7) | 0 | 0 | 0 | 0 | 0 | 0 | 0 | 0 (7) | 0 | 1 | 0 |
| 21 | FW | ENG | Jordan Cook | 27 (5) | 5 | 1 | 0 | 0 | 0 | 5 (1) | 0 | 33 (6) | 5 | 4 | 0 |
| 22 | MF | IRL | Liam Kinsella | 4 | 0 | 0 | 0 | 1 | 0 | 0 | 0 | 5 | 0 | 1 | 0 |
| 24 | FW | ENG | Ashley Grimes | 11 (16) | 2 | 0 (2) | 0 | 2 | 0 | 1 (4) | 0 | 14 (22) | 2 | 4 | 0 |
| 25 | DF | ENG | Rico Henry | 4 (5) | 0 | 0 | 0 | 0 | 0 | 1 | 0 | 5 (5) | 0 | 0 | 0 |
| ~~26~~ † | MF | ENG | Billy Clifford | 7 (6) | 0 | 0 | 0 | 1 (1) | 0 | 1 | 0 | 9 (7) | 0 | 1 | 0 |
| 27 | MF | IRL | Anthony Forde | 24 (13) | 3 | 2 | 0 | 1 | 0 | 4 (2) | 2 | 31 (15) | 5 | 1 | 0 |
| 28 | DF | ENG | Kyle Rowley | 0 | 0 | 0 | 0 | 0 | 0 | 0 | 0 | 0 | 0 | 0 | 0 |
| 29 | FW | ENG | Jordan Murphy | 0 (2) | 0 | 0 | 0 | 0 | 0 | 0 | 0 | 0 (2) | 0 | 0 | 0 |
| 30 | FW | ENG | Jordy Hiwula * | 17 (2) | 9 | 0 | 0 | 0 | 0 | 0 (1) | 0 | 17 (3) | 9 | 2 | 0 |
| ~~37~~ † | FW | FRA | Mathieu Manset | 4 (15) | 0 | 1 (1) | 0 | 0 | 0 | 1 (2) | 1 | 6 (18) | 1 | 2 | 0 |
| ~~44~~ † | DF | ENG | Andy Butler * | 7 | 0 | 0 | 0 | 0 | 0 | 0 | 0 | 7 | 0 | 2 | 0 |

Players not included in matchday squads
| No. | Pos. | Nat. | Name |
|---|---|---|---|
| 19 | MF | ENG | Jake Heath |
| 23 | GK | ENG | Liam Roberts |
