= Dean Smith (footballer, born 1971) =

English footballer and manager

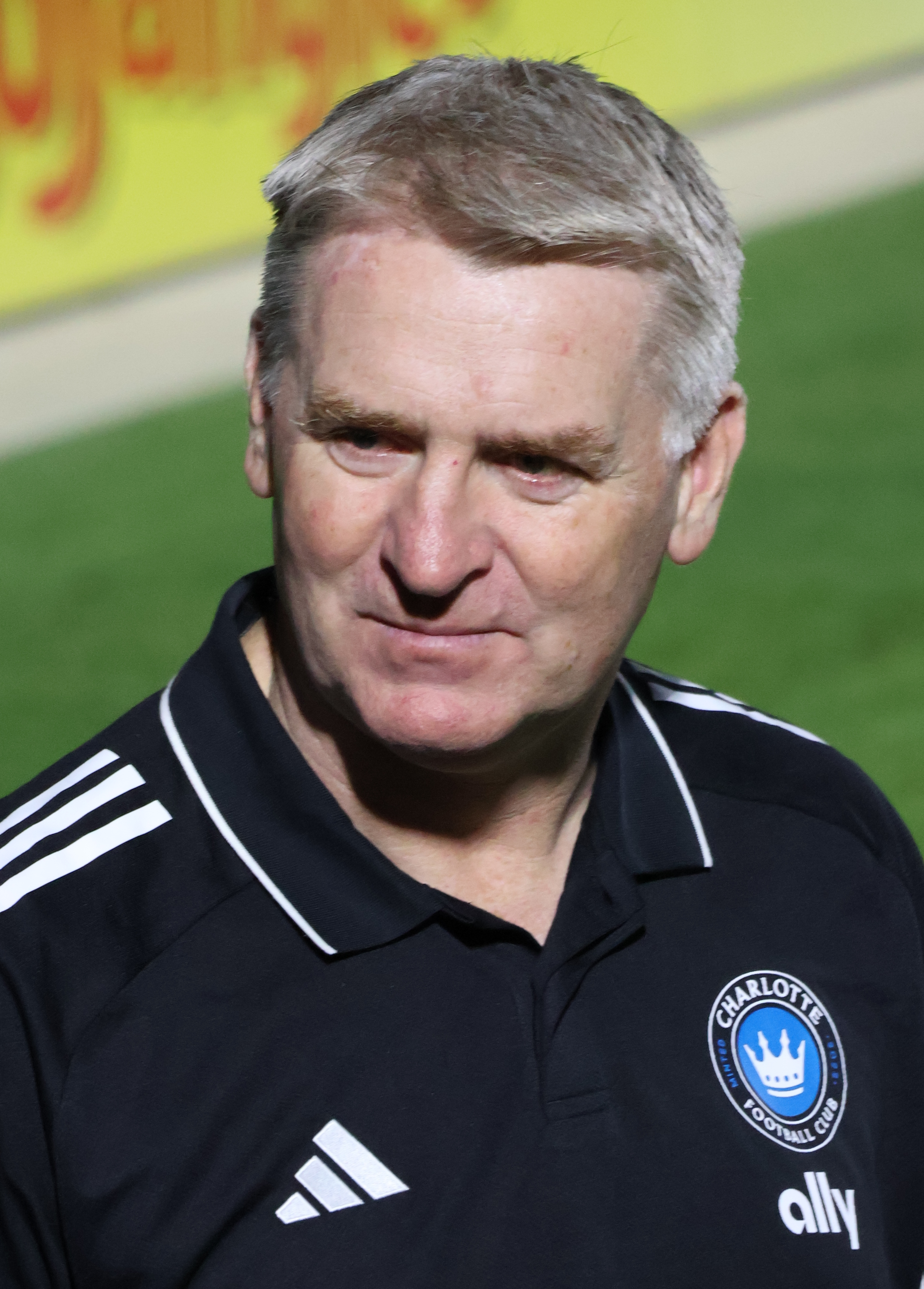
- Smith with Charlotte FC in 2025

Personal information
- Full name: Dean Smith
- Date of birth: 19 March 1971 (age 55)
- Place of birth: West Bromwich, England
- Height: 6 ft 0 in (1.83 m)
- Position: Centre-back

Team information
- Current team: Charlotte FC (head coach)

Youth career
- 1986–1989: Newcastle United

Senior career*
Years	Team	Apps	(Gls)
1989–1994	Walsall	142	(2)
1994–1997	Hereford United	117	(19)
1997–2003	Leyton Orient	239	(32)
2003–2004	Sheffield Wednesday	55	(1)
2004–2005	Port Vale	13	(0)
Total		566	(54)

Managerial career
- 2011–2015: Walsall
- 2015–2018: Brentford
- 2018–2021: Aston Villa
- 2021–2022: Norwich City
- 2023: Leicester City
- 2023–: Charlotte FC
- * Club domestic league appearances and goals

Dean Smith (born 19 March 1971) is an English professional football manager and former player who is the head coach of Major League Soccer club Charlotte FC.

Smith began his playing career as a defender with Walsall in 1989, where over five years he played 166 league and cup games. After signing for Hereford United in 1994, three years and 146 appearances later, he moved on to Leyton Orient. In six years with Orient, he made 309 appearances in all competitions before earning a move to Sheffield Wednesday in 2003. After a season with Wednesday, he moved on to Port Vale, retiring in January 2005. He scored 54 goals in 566 league games in a 16-year career in the Football League.

Returning to Leyton Orient, he worked as assistant manager until January 2009. In July 2009, he was appointed Head of Youth at Walsall before becoming manager in January 2011. He took Walsall from the relegation zone to safety in his first four months in charge. He took Walsall to the 2015 final of the Football League Trophy before leaving the club to manage Brentford in November 2015. Smith was appointed as Aston Villa manager in October 2018 and took the club from 15th in the Championship to the Premier League via the play-offs in the 2018–19 season, and then to the 2020 EFL Cup final. Aston Villa dismissed him in November 2021 and soon joined Norwich City for 13 months in charge. He was appointed as Leicester City manager on a short-term basis in April 2023. He was appointed head coach of American club Charlotte FC in December 2023.

== Playing career ==
Smith was offered schoolboy terms at Newcastle United at the age of 15 but was released when the club decided to focus on local players. He went on to work at a powder paint company.

=== Walsall ===
Smith started his professional career at Walsall, as the club suffered relegation from the Third Division in 1989–90 under John Barnwell's stewardship. They then struggled to adapt to life in the Fourth Division under new manager Kenny Hibbitt, finishing 16th in 1990–91 and 15th in 1991–92. The Saddlers qualified for the play-offs with a fifth-place finish in 1992–93, but were badly beaten by Crewe Alexandra at the semi-final stage. Walsall finished tenth in 1993–94, and Smith left the club, having played a total of 166 games for the Saddlers, scoring two goals.

=== Hereford United ===
In summer 1994, Smith was sold to Hereford United for £80,000, a club record fee for the "Bulls". They finished 16th in the Third Division in 1994–95 under John Layton. Smith was Graham Turner's captain at Edgar Street during the club's rise to the Third Division play-offs in 1995–96, where they were beaten by 4–2 Darlington at the semi-final stage, despite Smith opening the scoring just two minutes into the first leg.

Hereford were relegated from the English Football League after finishing in last place in 1996–97; they had been level on points with Brighton & Hove and with a superior goal difference, however, goals scored was the decider. Brighton scored three more than Hereford throughout the campaign. Smith was voted the club's Player of the Year. As the club's designated penalty kick taker, Smith scored 26 goals in 146 appearances in all competitions during his time at Edgar Street. He left the club on a Bosman transfer, leaving manager Graham Turner "absolutely staggered and gob-smacked" that the club's £200,000 valuation was not met.

=== Leyton Orient ===
Smith signed with Tommy Taylor's Leyton Orient in August 1997, with a tribunal setting the fee at £42,500. He scored ten goals in 51 games in 1997–98; Orient would have finished one point outside the Third Division play-offs had they not been deducted three points. He captained Orient to the play-offs in 1998–99, and converted a penalty in the shoot-out victory over Rotherham United at the semi-final stage. However, his team were beaten 1–0 by Scunthorpe United in the Wembley final. Throughout the campaign he scored ten goals in 49 appearances.

Orient then struggled in 1999–2000, finishing in the bottom half of the table. Smith was again a key player, scoring six goals in 50 appearances. Following a fifth-place finish in 2000–01, he again captained the "O's" to the play-off final in 2001, this time at the Millennium Stadium. Despite twice taking the lead against Blackpool, they lost the match 4–2. Throughout the season he scored five goals in 54 games.

He scored four goals in 51 games in 2001–02, but Paul Brush's team struggled and finished in mid-table, closer to the relegation zone than the play-offs, though they were 16 points above the drop. Smith continued to feature heavily in the 2002–03 campaign, though he left the club in mid-season. He had played 309 games for the club in all competitions, scoring 43 goals.

=== Sheffield Wednesday ===
He joined First Division side Sheffield Wednesday in February 2003, then managed by Chris Turner. The "Owls" were relegated at the end of the season, having finished in 22nd place, four points below Stoke City. He was appointed club captain in the summer, however, Wednesday struggled in the Second Division and finished just three points above relegated Grimsby Town. Smith played 48 games in 2003–04, scoring one goal. The club then had a clear out of personnel, and Smith was one of 13 players to depart Hillsborough. He had scored one goal in 62 appearances for Wednesday.

=== Port Vale ===
In July 2004, he signed for Port Vale after impressing manager Martin Foyle on a trial basis. He played 13 League One games and two cup games for the "Valiants" in 2004–05, before he ended his playing days in January 2005 when he left Vale Park to become youth team coach at his old club Leyton Orient.

== Managerial career ==
After working as a youth coach at Leyton Orient from January 2005, Smith was promoted to assistant manager toward the end of the 2004–05 season. He attained his UEFA Pro Licence in 2008, alongside classmates such as Roy Keane, Brendan Rodgers, and Ian McParland. After a poor run of form, Smith left Orient in January 2009, along with long-serving manager Martin Ling.

=== Walsall ===
In July 2009, Smith returned to his first club, Walsall, as Head of Youth.

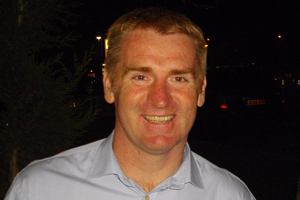
Smith in 2011

Smith was appointed caretaker manager of Walsall on 4 January 2011, following the dismissal of Chris Hutchings. 17 days later, he was announced as the club's permanent manager until the end of the season. Taking over managerial duties with his side nine points adrift at the foot of League One, Smith managed to steer Walsall out of the drop zone before the season's end. On 29 January, the "Saddlers" recorded their best league result since 1986 by beating Bristol Rovers 6–1, in what was Smith's first win in charge; the three points also took Walsall off the foot of the table, though they were still seven points short of safety. His team made up the difference over February, and a 1–0 win over promotion-chasing Southampton on 1 March saw Walsall climb out of the relegation zone for the first time since October. They ended the season one point clear of Dagenham & Redbridge in the drop zone.

He let 14 players go in the summer of 2011, including Darren Byfield, Jonny Brain, Clayton McDonald, Paul Marshall, Matt Richards, Steve Jones, Aaron Lescott, David Bevan, Julian Gray, and Tom Williams. He then signed goalkeeper Dávid Gróf; defenders Mat Sadler and Lee Beevers; midfielders Kevan Hurst, Claude Gnakpa, Adam Chambers, and Anton Peterlin; and striker Ryan Jarvis. Also during the campaign he boosted his squad with loan signings Dave Martin, Mark Wilson, Andy Halliday, and Florent Cuvelier. His side lost just one of their first five league games but then picked up just three points from their next seven games. They beat Preston North End on 15 October but then picked up just four points from their next eight games. From 26 November, they were beaten just once in nine matches but became the division's draw specialists as seven of these nine games finished level. They finished the campaign in 19th place, seven points clear of the relegation zone.

In summer 2012, he offered professional contracts to youth team players Mal Benning, Ben George, Aaron Williams and Kieron Morris. He continued to add promising young players by bringing in 21-year-old winger Ashley Hemmings, 19-year-old former loanee Florent Cuvelier, 19-year-old winger James Baxendale, 20-year-old defender Paul Downing, 19-year-old striker Connor Taylor, 23-year-old striker Febian Brandy, in addition to 32-year-old right-back Dean Holden. He also brought in full-back James Chambers, twin brother of Adam Chambers. He also brought in a number of players on loan, including: Karl Darlow (21), Sam Mantom (20), Aaron McCarey (20), and Craig Westcarr (27). Mantom was made into a permanent signing in January. Smith signed a new two-and-a-half-year contract in October, keeping him at the club until summer 2015. This came after the club announced a £10,000 profit on the previous campaign as Smith's 'Total Football' approach yielded a mid-table position for the young Walsall team, in addition to praise from pundits and fans. A poor run of results saw the team slip to just above the relegation zone in mid-December. Walsall recovered to win four of their five games in January, as Smith was named as Manager of the Month. They ended the season in ninth place, six points outside the play-offs.

During a fine start to the 2013–14 season, Smith, affectionately nicknamed "Ginger Mourinho" by the Walsall fans, took the club to an unlikely promotion push. He masterminded a win at Molineux against Black Country derby rivals, Wolverhampton Wanderers, and also ended winning streaks by table-toppers Leyton Orient and Brentford. The club could not sustain their promotion push however, and ended the campaign in 13th place. Smith released top-scorer Craig Westcarr at the end of the season, along with Troy Hewitt, Nicky Featherstone, James McQuilkin, and Shane Lewis.

He took Walsall to the 2015 final of the Football League Trophy, a 2–0 defeat to Bristol City, which was Walsall's first appearance at Wembley Stadium. At the end of the 2014–15 season he largely kept his squad together, the most high-profile player to be released being Ben Purkiss. He was given a Special Achievement Award by the League Managers Association (LMA).

Walsall started the 2015–16 season well, with Smith being named League One Manager of the Month for August 2015 as the club ended the month at the top of the table. Walsall rejected an approach for Smith from Rotherham United in October, describing him as "fundamental to our future plans". Smith signed a new 12-month rolling contract on 16 October. He was named as Football League manager of the week after his side came from two goals down to beat Gillingham 3–2 on 24 October. However, six weeks after signing his new contract he left Walsall for Brentford with the "Saddlers" fourth in the table; at the time of his departure he was the fourth longest serving manager in the Football League.

=== Brentford ===
Smith was appointed manager of Championship club Brentford on 30 November 2015. Brentford finished the 2015–16 season in ninth place, during which time Smith sold Toumani Diagouraga and James Tarkowski for a combined £3.6 million. In building for the 2016–17 season Smith signed 18 players, including Romaine Sawyers (free transfer) and Rico Henry (£1.5 million) from previous club Walsall. The "Bees" finished the season in tenth place, and Smith said he wanted to bring in more players in order to push for the play-offs the following season. He signed a new one-year contract extension in February 2018. Brentford finished the 2017–18 season in ninth-place and were "widely regarded as the Championship's entertainers" after Smith built an attractive passing style of play on a shoestring budget.

=== Aston Villa ===
On 10 October 2018, Smith was appointed manager of 15th-placed Championship club Aston Villa, with John Terry as his assistant coach. He was named as the EFL's manager of the week after overseeing a 3–0 win at Derby County on 10 November. He immediately managed to reinvigorate the Villa attack, and only a controversial injury-time equaliser from local rivals West Bromwich Albion at The Hawthorns kept them from a place in the top 6 by 7 December. Villa's form dipped dramatically in the three months after Jack Grealish was sidelined with a shin injury picked up in that match, but on 2 March, Smith gave Grealish the captaincy on his return to the first-team and the 23-year-old inspired an important 4–0 victory over play-off rivals Derby County. Smith was given that month's Championship Manager of the Month award after achieving five wins in five games, including a victory over Second City derby rivals Birmingham City.

On 22 April 2019, Smith led Aston Villa to break an 109-year-old club record for longest winning run after defeating Millwall 1–0 at Villa Park to make it 10 successive victories in 10 matches. The record had previously been held at nine straight wins. On 11 May, Smith oversaw his 18th win with Aston Villa as they came from behind to beat West Brom 2–1 in the first leg of the Championship play-off semi-finals. Three days later, Villa came from behind at West Brom to win on penalties and secure a place in the play-off final. Villa went on to win promotion to the Premier League with a 2–1 victory over Derby County.

The club spent a net total of £144.5 million to bring in 12 players in the summer 2019 transfer window: Jota, Anwar El Ghazi, Wesley, Kortney Hause, Matt Targett, Tyrone Mings, Ezri Konsa, Björn Engels, Trézéguet, Douglas Luiz, Tom Heaton and Marvelous Nakamba. On 29 November 2019, midway through his first Premier League season with Aston Villa, Smith signed a contract extension lasting until 2023. In the EFL Cup, Villa advanced past Crewe Alexandra of League Two and four Premier League sides in Brighton & Hove Albion, Wolverhampton Wanderers, Liverpool and Leicester City to reach the final at Wembley Stadium; they lost the final 2–1 to Manchester City. In the league though, Villa were four points deep inside the relegation zone with four games left to play of the 2019–20 season, but pulled off what he called a "magnificent achievement" to clinch survival on the last day with a 1–1 draw at West Ham United. He elaborated by saying "I thought we used the pandemic really well. We've been solid defensively, we have looked strong and managed to stay in the Premier League."

Smith strengthened the squad in summer 2020 by signing Matty Cash (£14 million from Nottingham Forest), Ollie Watkins (£28 million from Brentford), Emiliano Martínez (£17 million from Arsenal), Bertrand Traoré (£17 million from Lyon) and Ross Barkley (season long-loan from Chelsea). On 4 October, in the third game of the 2020–21 season, Smith led Aston Villa to a 7–2 home win over Premier League champions Liverpool; this was the first time a team had scored seven goals past the top-flight champions in 67 years. A win against Leicester City then gave Villa their best start to a season since 1930. On 26 December, Smith oversaw his century of competitive games as manager of Aston Villa with a 3–0 victory over Crystal Palace despite his team being reduced to ten men for the majority of the game due to Tyrone Mings' first-half dismissal. Smith was named as Premier League Manager of the Month for December as Villa conceded just one goal in their five league games. He made one signing in the January transfer window: midfielder Morgan Sanson from Marseille for £14 million. Aston Villa ended the campaign in 11th-place and Smith was keen to strengthen the squad further.

In preparation for the English record transfer of Jack Grealish to Manchester City, a deal worth £100 million, Smith brought in summer signings Emiliano Buendía, Leon Bailey and Danny Ings for a total fee of £83 million. The club also signed former player Ashley Young on a free transfer from Inter Milan, and for the third time signed Manchester United defender Axel Tuanzebe on loan. On 7 November 2021, Smith and Aston Villa parted company after a run of five straight defeats in the Premier League. Chief Executive Christian Purslow stated that the decision was made after Aston Villa had not continued to improve in the 2021–22 season as they had done in previous years.

=== Norwich City ===
On 15 November 2021, Smith signed a two-and-a-half-year deal to become the new Norwich City head coach, replacing the outgoing Daniel Farke. He won his first game in charge, a 2–1 victory over Southampton. The game made him the first manager to take charge of successive Premier League matches against the same opponent. Norwich climbed out of the relegation zone on 21 January with a 3–0 win at Watford, having beaten Everton at Carrow Road six days previously. However, Norwich went on to win just one more Premier League game and were relegated in last place at the end of the 2021–22 season, though relegation was confirmed with four games left to play.

On 27 December 2022, Smith was dismissed as Norwich City head coach after a run of just three wins in 13 Championship matches saw the club fall from first in October to fifth in the table and twelve points off the top two; sporting director Stuart Webber said the decision was taken to "give ourselves the best possible chance of achieving our objective of promotion to the Premier League this season". David Wagner became his successor.

=== Leicester City ===
On 10 April 2023, Smith was appointed as manager of Leicester City to replace Brendan Rodgers until the end of the 2022–23 season, with the club second-bottom of the Premier League with eight games left to play; Craig Shakespeare and John Terry joined his coaching staff as assistant managers. He secured nine points from his games in charge, which were ultimately not enough to keep the team in the league, with the club's relegation confirmed on the final day of the season. Smith left the club on 16 June.

=== Charlotte FC ===
On 12 December 2023, Smith was named the head coach of Major League Soccer team Charlotte FC. Charlotte qualified for the 2024 MLS Cup playoffs, losing to Orlando City on penalties in round one. He signed a new two-year contract in March 2025. Charlotte entered a nine-match regular season winning streak in early July that tied with Seattle Sounders FC for the longest in the league's post-shootout era. They ended the 2025 season fourth in the Eastern Conference and seventh in the overall MLS standings, losing to New York City FC in round one of the play-offs.

== Personal life ==
Dean Smith's father, Ron, was an Aston Villa supporter and a steward at Villa Park. Towards the end of his life, Ron Smith suffered from dementia and was not aware that his son had become Aston Villa's manager. On the eve of the 2019 play-off final, Dean Smith visited his father and told him "The next time I see you, I'll be a Premier League manager." Ron Smith died on 27 May 2020.

When Villa won the 1982 European Cup final, eleven-year-old Dean was a neighbour to Villa player Pat Heard. Smith was not allowed to go to the final, but Heard ensured the young boy was on the team bus as it paraded the trophy through Birmingham. When appointed manager, Smith picked out Heard as an inspiration.

Smith is married, and has two children – a son, Jamie, and a daughter. Speaking in December 2019, he said that his family, coupled with his experiencing playing and managing in the lower leagues, have helped him to stay grounded and deal with the perceived pressure of managing a Premier League team. He is a keen chess player and was a West Midlands school chess champion as a child.

== Career statistics ==
=== Playing statistics ===
Appearances and goals by club, season and competition
Club	Season	League			FA Cup		Other		Total	
Club	Season	Division	Apps	Goals	Apps	Goals	Apps	Goals	Apps	Goals
Walsall	1988–89	Second Division	15	0	0	0	0	0	15	0
Walsall	1989–90	Third Division	7	0	1	0	0	0	8	0
Walsall	1990–91	Fourth Division	33	0	2	0	5	0	40	0
Walsall	1991–92	Fourth Division	9	0	0	0	2	0	11	0
Walsall	1992–93	Third Division	42	1	0	0	9	0	51	1
Walsall	1993–94	Third Division	36	1	1	0	4	0	41	1
Walsall	Total		142	2	4	0	20	0	166	2
Hereford United	1994–95	Third Division	35	3	2	0	8	1	45	4
Hereford United	1995–96	Third Division	40	8	4	0	9	4	53	12
Hereford United	1996–97	Third Division	42	8	1	0	5	2	48	10
Hereford United	Total		117	19	7	0	22	7	146	26
Leyton Orient	1997–98	Third Division	43	9	2	1	6	0	51	10
Leyton Orient	1998–99	Third Division	37	9	5	1	7	0	49	10
Leyton Orient	1999–2000	Third Division	44	4	2	1	4	0	50	5
Leyton Orient	2000–01	Third Division	43	5	4	0	7	0	54	5
Leyton Orient	2001–02	Third Division	45	2	4	1	2	1	51	4
Leyton Orient	2002–03	Third Division	27	3	2	0	4	0	33	3
Leyton Orient	Total		239	32	19	4	30	1	288	37
Sheffield Wednesday	2002–03	First Division	14	0	0	0	0	0	14	0
Sheffield Wednesday	2003–04	Second Division	41	1	2	0	5	0	48	1
Sheffield Wednesday	Total		55	1	2	0	5	0	62	1
Port Vale	2004–05	League One	13	0	0	0	2	1	15	1
Career total			566	54	32	4	79	9	677	67

=== Managerial statistics ===
As of match played 7 November 2026

Managerial record by team and tenure
Team	From	To	Record					Ref.
Team	From	To	P	W	D	L	Win %	Ref.
Walsall	4 January 2011	30 November 2015	260	84	96	80	32.31	
Brentford	30 November 2015	10 October 2018	143	57	35	51	39.86	
Aston Villa	10 October 2018	7 November 2021	139	55	28	56	39.57	
Norwich City	15 November 2021	27 December 2022	56	16	12	28	28.57	
Leicester City	10 April 2023	16 June 2023	8	2	3	3	25.00	
Charlotte FC	12 December 2023	present	120	53	26	41	44.17	
Total			726	267	200	259	36.78	

== Honours ==
=== Playing honours ===
Individual

- Hereford United Player of the Year: 1996–97

=== Managerial honours ===
Walsall

- Football League Trophy runner-up: 2014–15

Aston Villa

- EFL Championship play-offs: 2019
- EFL Cup runner-up: 2019–20

Individual

- League Managers Association Special Achievement Award: 2015
- Football League One Manager of the Month: January 2013, August 2015
- EFL Championship Manager of the Month: March 2019
- Premier League Manager of the Month: December 2020
