= Mal Benning =

English footballer (born 1993)

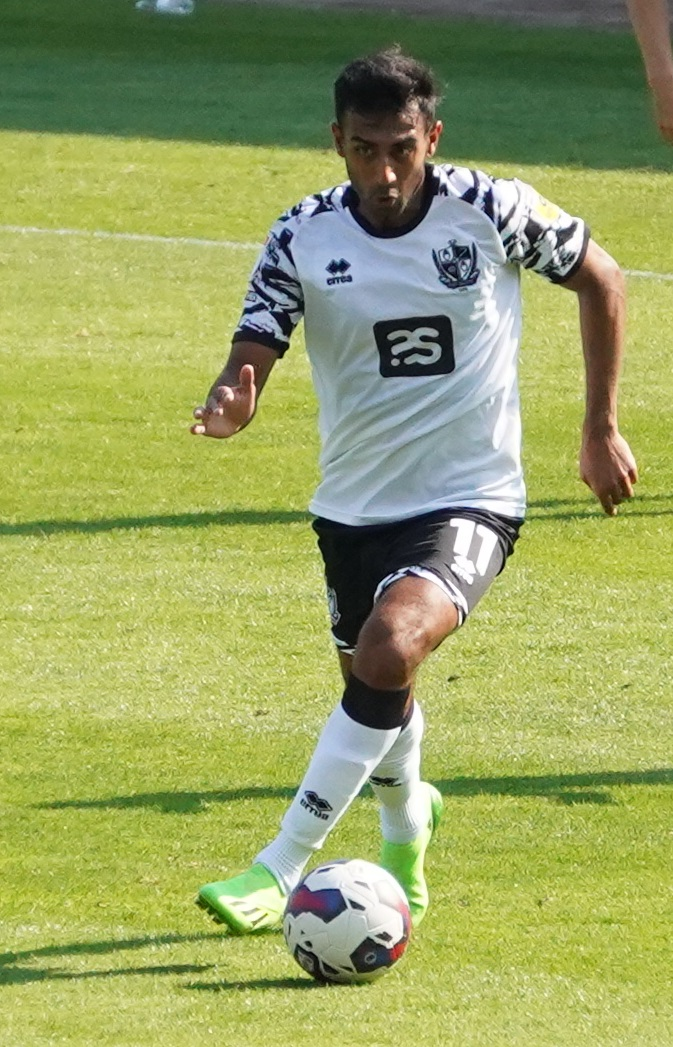
- Benning playing for Port Vale in 2022

Personal information
- Full name: Malvind Singh Benning
- Date of birth: 2 November 1993 (age 33)
- Place of birth: West Bromwich, England
- Height: 5 ft 10 in (1.78 m)
- Position: Left-back

Team information
- Current team: AFC Telford United

Youth career
- 2001–2011: Walsall

Senior career*
| Years | Team | Apps | (Gls) |
| 2011–2015 | Walsall | 46 | (2) |
| 2012 | → Evesham United (loan) | 5 | (0) |
| 2015 | → York City (loan) | 9 | (0) |
| 2015–2021 | Mansfield Town | 214 | (9) |
| 2021–2023 | Port Vale | 65 | (2) |
| 2023–2026 | Shrewsbury Town | 99 | (3) |
| 2026– | AFC Telford United | 0 | (0) |
- * Club domestic league appearances and goals as of 19:59, 3 May 2026 (UTC)

Malvind Singh Benning (born 2 November 1993) is an English professional footballer who plays as a left-back for National League North club AFC Telford United.

Benning began his career with Walsall and had loan spells with Evesham United and York City. He made his debut in the English Football League at Walsall in November 2012 and went on to feature 53 times in total before signing with Mansfield Town in May 2015. He spent six seasons with Mansfield, making 251 appearances in all competitions. He signed with Port Vale in June 2021 and helped the club to win promotion out of League Two via the play-offs in 2022. He transferred to Shrewsbury Town in August 2023, where he remained for three years. He returned to non-League football with AFC Telford United in September 2026.

== Early and personal life ==
Benning, whose parents are Indian Sikhs, was born in West Bromwich, West Midlands. He was educated at Queen Mary's Grammar School and is a Liverpool supporter. Speaking in 2023, he said he attended gurdwara prayers at least twice a week.

He was named on Kick It Out's new advisory board in June 2021; Benning had been targeted for racist abuse on Twitter in January 2020, which was reported to the police by the Professional Footballers' Association. However, Benning stated that other than that he had "not experienced much 'racism' as one of very few Asian players in the professional game" (0.25% of the 3,700 professional players in 2020 were British Asian). He won the South Asian Pioneer Award in 2026. He and his father started MJBENN Ltd, a bridging lending firm, in 2021.

== Club career ==
=== Walsall ===
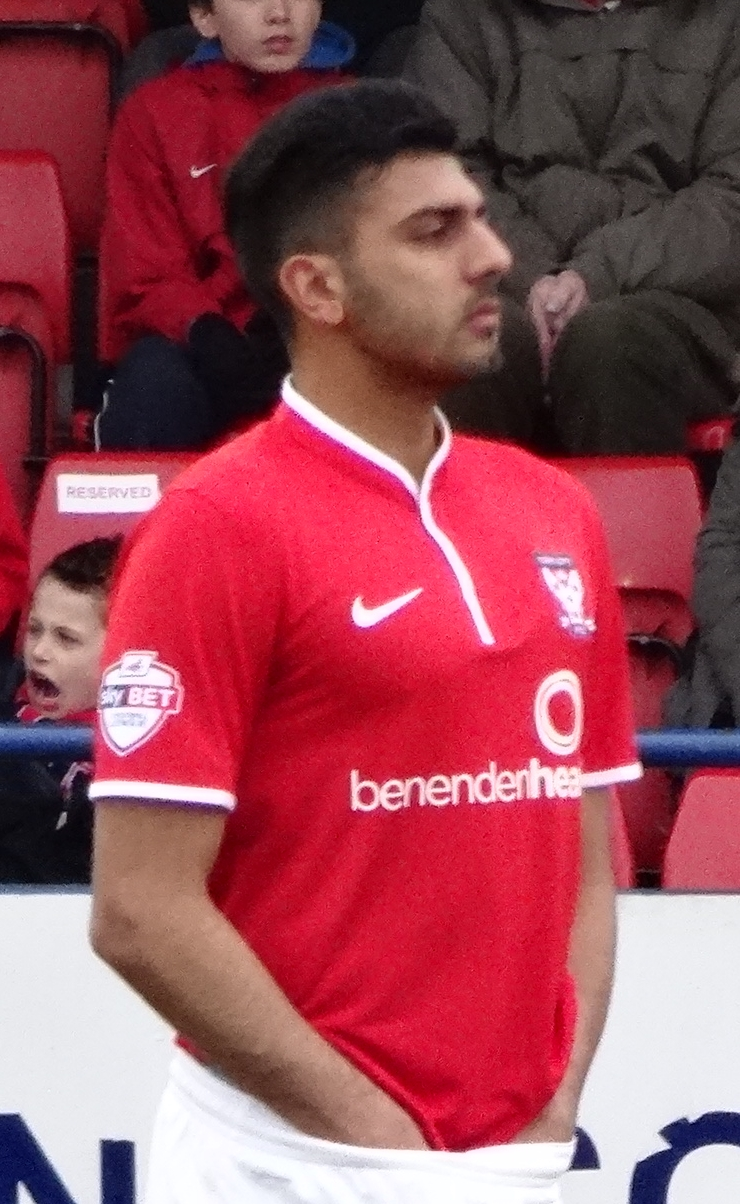
Benning playing for York City in 2015

Benning started his career with Walsall, progressing through the youth system from the under-8 side. He played as a midfielder before gaining weight and being moved to left-back in his early teenage years. In January 2012, he joined Non-League club Evesham United, who played in the Southern League Premier Division, on a youth loan. He made his first-team debut for Walsall at the Bescot Stadium on 6 November 2012, in a 4–1 defeat to Scunthorpe United in League One, coming on as a substitute for James Chambers. He signed his first professional contract, of two and a half years, in January 2013. He went on to start seven games and make four substitute appearances in the 2012–13 season. On 5 March 2014, he scored his first goal in senior football in a 2–1 defeat at Coventry City. He claimed another goal in a 3–2 defeat at Stevenage the following month and ended the 2013–14 season with 15 starts and three appearances from the bench. He was played mainly at right-back in his early career, keeping the experienced Ben Purkiss out of the team.

Benning joined League Two club York City on 22 January 2015 on a one-month loan, with manager Russ Wilcox looking to provide competition for the ever-present Femi Ilesanmi. He made his debut in a 1–1 home draw with Burton Albion two days later and his loan was extended by a second month in February 2015. Having made nine appearances he was recalled by Walsall on 16 March 2015 after an injury to Andy Taylor. He made 13 starts and 11 substitute appearances for Walsall in the 2014–15 season, and was often played further up the pitch from his familiar left-back position by manager Dean Smith. Benning was released in May 2015.

=== Mansfield Town ===
Benning signed for League Two club Mansfield Town on 22 May 2015. He suffered a cruciate knee ligament injury in October 2015 and was out of action for four months; he tested his recovery from the injury by tackling a brick wall. Manager Adam Murray had initially worried that Benning could be ruled out for the whole of the 2015–16 season. Still, it transpired that no surgery was necessary to repair the damage as 12 weeks in a brace was sufficient to allow the body to heal itself. He signed a new contract of undisclosed length in May 2016, having scored four goals from 33 games. He missed just one league and one EFL Trophy game during the 2016–17 season, playing a total of 52 times and scoring one goal, as the club posted a 12th-place finish. He told the media that new manager Steve Evans had "made an impact instantly" and "made it clear that he's striving for promotion", but that for Benning "the main focus is to keep my place in the team".

He signed a new one-year contract in February 2018. However, he was sent off in a 1–0 defeat to Accrington Stanley at Field Mill on 31 March, a lack of discipline which caused him to be criticised by newly appointed manager David Flitcroft. He scored a winning goal against local rivals Chesterfield on 14 April, which earned him the nickname "Sir Mal" from supporters. This was his only goal from 34 appearances in the 2017–18 season, one in which Mansfield finished one place outside the play-offs. Benning adapted well to the new manager's wing-back system and after he increased his running statistics towards the end of the season credited Flitcroft's work ethic in training for his improved fitness levels.

Benning featured 55 times over the course of the 2018–19 season, missing just one league game. Mansfield finished in fourth place but were beaten on penalties by Newport County in the semi-finals of the play-offs despite Benning converting his penalty. Flitcroft was sacked after the defeat, though Benning said that he was ready to focus on football again after returning from holiday in Mexico and that he and the rest of the squad had had positive meetings with new manager John Dempster. However, the new season went poorly and Dempster was replaced by Graham Coughlan in December. Benning played 39 games in the 2019–20 season, which saw Mansfield finish 21st on points per game after the season was curtailed early due to the COVID-19 pandemic in England.

He lost his left-back position to Stephen McLaughlin during the 2020–21 season. However, he would regain his first-team spot and earned praise for his consistency from manager Nigel Clough in January. On 27 April 2021, it was announced that he would leave Mansfield to "seek a new challenge" with the decision made "amicably and mutually", having made 251 appearances in a six-year stay at the club. He stated that "one massive regret is to not have been able to help get the club promoted"; he was the 18th highest appearance maker in the club's history at the time of his departure.

=== Port Vale ===
Benning warming up for Port Vale in 2022

On 28 June 2021, Benning agreed a one-year contract with Port Vale, to begin on 1 July; he was signed to compete with fellow new arrival Dan Jones. He started five of the "Valiants" first seven League Two games of the 2021–22 season, but admitted that "I think there is a lot more to come from me... I feel like I can do a lot more". He was dropped to the bench after James Gibbons returned from injury, but came on as a half-time substitute to score his first goal at Vale Park in a 3–1 win over Barrow on 16 October. He was limited to 17 league starts in the 2021–22 campaign, but would score the winning penalty kick in the penalty shoot-out victory over Swindon Town in the play-off semi-finals. He started in the play-off final at Wembley Stadium and scored Vale's final goal as they secured promotion with a 3–0 victory over former club Mansfield Town; Michael Baggaley of The Sentinel wrote that Benning was "excellent" and he "set up Harratt's opener, went close to scoring in the first half then confirmed Vale's victory with a sliding volley for the third five minutes from time". He signed a new one-year contract in June 2022.

He enjoyed an excellent run of form at the start of the 2022–23 season, maintaining a first-team place despite competition for the left-wing-back position from Dan Jones, Liam McCarron and Thierry Small, whilst Chris Hussey was allowed to leave the club. Speaking in December, manager Darrell Clarke said that Benning "has defended very, very well; it hasn't been one of his main strengths but he has been good going forward, he has added that to his game and been ultra-consistent". He did though lose his first-team place to Sammy Robinson as the club's form tailed off in the second half of the campaign. His stay with the club was automatically extended by a year after he triggered an appearance-based clause. However, director of football David Flitcroft said that he "wouldn't get the regular game time that he would hope for and that a move away from Vale Park would be in his best interest".

=== Shrewsbury Town ===
On 3 August 2023, Benning joined League One side Shrewsbury Town on a one-year deal. He was voted as Shrewsbury's Player of the Month for January 2024. He was initially in and out of the first XI under Matthew Taylor before establishing himself as a regular starter under new manager Paul Hurst. He was named as the club's Player of the Month for January 2024 and impressed Hurst with his link-up play with midfielder Jordan Shipley. He again won the award for February and ended the 2023–24 season with 46 appearances to his name. He signed a new two-year deal in May 2024 after settling in well following a slow start at the New Meadow.

He scored his first goal in over a year in unusual circumstances when his 60-yard free-kick bounced over Blackpool goalkeeper Harry Tyrer on 4 December 2024. He reached his 400th career league appearance in the 2024–25 season. The campaign ended in relegation, however, as the club cycled between three managers – Paul Hurst, Gareth Ainsworth and Michael Appleton. He reached his 500th career appearance in professional football in February 2026. He had been frozen out of the first-team under Appleton, before returning under new manager Gavin Cowan, who described the achievement as "Incredible. It reflects the gentleman that he is, the professional that he is, and the player that he is". It was confirmed on 24 April, that Benning would depart the club upon the expiry of his contract at the end of the season.

=== AFC Telford United ===
On 4 September 2026, Benning joined National League North club AFC Telford United. He was named on the National League North Team of the Week for the weekend of 12 September for his performance against Harborough Town.

== International career ==
Benning stated his desire to represent the India national team in August 2015, but said he was unable to as the nation's strict rules on eligibility meant he would have first to give up his British passport and get an Indian passport.

== Style of play ==
Benning is an attacking left-back, who is also able to play at left wing-back. He has pace and good crossing ability, also boasting good free kick and volleying skills.

== Career statistics ==
As of match played 25 April 2026

Appearances and goals by club, season and competition
| Club | Season | League | | | FA Cup | | League Cup | | Other | | Total | |
| Club | Season | Division | Apps | Goals | Apps | Goals | Apps | Goals | Apps | Goals | Apps | Goals |
|---|---|---|---|---|---|---|---|---|---|---|---|---|
| Walsall | 2011–12 | League One | 0 | 0 | 0 | 0 | 0 | 0 | 0 | 0 | 0 | 0 |
| Walsall | 2012–13 | League One | 10 | 0 | 1 | 0 | 0 | 0 | 0 | 0 | 11 | 0 |
| Walsall | 2013–14 | League One | 16 | 2 | 1 | 0 | 1 | 0 | 0 | 0 | 18 | 2 |
| Walsall | 2014–15 | League One | 20 | 0 | 1 | 0 | 2 | 1 | 1 (Note: Appearance in Football League Trophy) | 0 | 24 | 1 |
| Walsall | Total | | 46 | 2 | 3 | 0 | 3 | 1 | 1 | 0 | 53 | 3 |
| Evesham United (loan) | 2011–12 | Southern League; Premier Division | 5 | 0 | — | | — | | — | | 5 | 0 |
| York City (loan) | 2014–15 | League Two | 9 | 0 | — | | — | | — | | 9 | 0 |
| Mansfield Town | 2015–16 | League Two | 31 | 4 | 0 | 0 | 1 | 0 | 1 | 0 | 33 | 4 |
| Mansfield Town | 2016–17 | League Two | 45 | 1 | 1 | 0 | 1 | 0 | 5 (Note: Appearances in EFL Trophy) | 0 | 52 | 1 |
| Mansfield Town | 2017–18 | League Two | 28 | 1 | 3 | 0 | 1 | 0 | 2 | 0 | 34 | 1 |
| Mansfield Town | 2018–19 | League Two | 45 | 3 | 2 | 0 | 2 | 0 | 6 (Note: Four appearances and one goal in EFL Trophy, two appearances in League Two play-offs) | 1 | 55 | 4 |
| Mansfield Town | 2019–20 | League Two | 33 | 0 | 2 | 0 | 1 | 0 | 3 | 0 | 39 | 0 |
| Mansfield Town | 2020–21 | League Two | 32 | 0 | 3 | 0 | 1 | 0 | 2 | 0 | 38 | 0 |
| Mansfield Town | Total | | 214 | 9 | 11 | 0 | 7 | 0 | 19 | 1 | 251 | 10 |
| Port Vale | 2021–22 | League Two | 26 | 1 | 2 | 0 | 1 | 0 | 7 (Note: Four appearances and one goal in EFL Trophy, three appearances and one goal in League Two play-offs) | 2 | 36 | 3 |
| Port Vale | 2022–23 | League One | 39 | 1 | 1 | 0 | 1 | 1 | 3 | 1 | 44 | 3 |
| Port Vale | Total | | 65 | 2 | 3 | 0 | 2 | 1 | 10 | 3 | 80 | 6 |
| Shrewsbury Town | 2023–24 | League One | 39 | 0 | 3 | 0 | 1 | 0 | 3 | 1 | 46 | 1 |
| Shrewsbury Town | 2024–25 | League One | 44 | 3 | 1 | 0 | 2 | 0 | 2 | 0 | 49 | 3 |
| Shrewsbury Town | 2025–26 | League Two | 16 | 0 | 1 | 0 | 1 | 0 | 3 | 0 | 21 | 0 |
| Shrewsbury Town | Total | | 99 | 3 | 5 | 0 | 4 | 0 | 8 | 1 | 116 | 4 |
| AFC Telford United | 2026–27 | National League North | 0 | 0 | 0 | 0 | — | | 0 | 0 | 0 | 0 |
| Career total | | | 438 | 16 | 22 | 0 | 16 | 2 | 38 | 5 | 514 | 23 |

== Honours ==
Port Vale

- EFL League Two play-offs: 2022

== See also ==
- List of Sikh footballers
