= Ben Purkiss =

English footballer

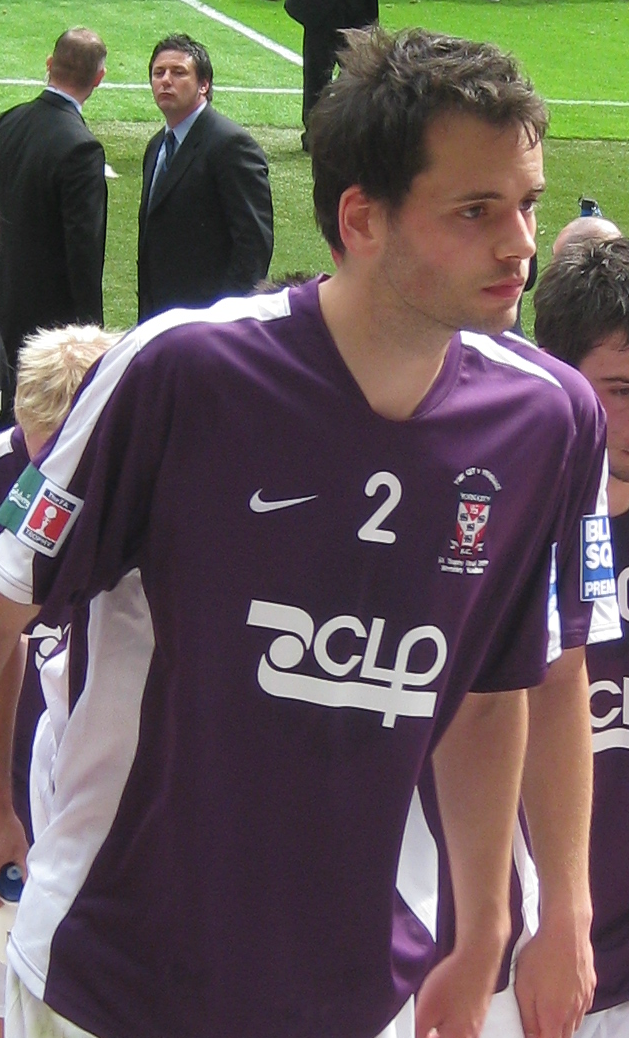
- Purkiss after playing for York City in the 2009 FA Trophy final

Personal information
- Full name: Benjamin John Purkiss
- Date of birth: 1 April 1984 (age 42)
- Place of birth: Sheffield, England
- Height: 6 ft 2 in (1.88 m)
- Position: Defender

Youth career
- –2003: Sheffield United

Senior career*
Years	Team	Apps	(Gls)
2003	Sheffield United	0	(0)
2003–2007	Gainsborough Trinity	113	(1)
2007	→ York City (loan)	8	(0)
2007–2010	York City	112	(2)
2010–2012	Oxford United	23	(0)
2011	→ Darlington (loan)	12	(0)
2012	Hereford United	15	(0)
2012–2015	Walsall	73	(0)
2015–2017	Port Vale	71	(0)
2017–2018	Swindon Town	41	(0)
2018	Walsall	0	(0)
Total		486	(3)
- * Club domestic league appearances and goals

Benjamin John Purkiss (born 1 April 1984) is an English former professional footballer and former chairman of the Professional Footballers' Association (PFA).

Having failed to break into the Sheffield United first team, he joined Gainsborough Trinity in 2003. He spent four years at the club before winning a move to York City in 2007. He played for York in the 2009 FA Trophy final and 2010 Conference Premier play-off final, both of which ended in defeat. He signed with Oxford United in May 2010 and, after one season with the club, was loaned out to Darlington before he was allowed to join Hereford United in January 2012.

Purkiss joined Walsall in August of the same year and spent three seasons with the club, appearing on the losing team in the 2015 Football League Trophy final. He joined Port Vale in June 2015 and was appointed as joint-captain the following year. He switched to Swindon Town in June 2017 and rejoined Walsall in October 2018. He was elected as chairman of the PFA in November 2017. He served in the role for four years.

== Club career ==
=== Sheffield United ===
Born in Sheffield, South Yorkshire, Purkiss progressed through the Sheffield United youth system and was included in the first-team for the 2003–04 season.

=== Gainsborough Trinity ===
He was released by United in 2003 and joined Northern Premier League Premier Division club Gainsborough Trinity, choosing to pursue a career in semi-professional football while studying for a degree in French and Law at the University of Sheffield. He made his debut for Gainsborough in a 2–0 defeat to Stalybridge Celtic on 16 August. He played in a 7–1 defeat to Second Division team Brentford in the FA Cup first round on 8 November. Purkiss was targeted by Third Division club Scunthorpe United and was handed a trial at the club in December 2003. He finished the season with 34 appearances for Gainsborough. He signed a new one-year contract on 5 May 2004. He scored his first goal in a 2–1 defeat to Alfreton Town on 17 August. He completed 2004–05 with 37 appearances 1 one goal. His 2005–06 season was restricted to 15 appearances due to his studies in France. He started in a 3–1 defeat to League Two team Barnet in the FA Cup first round on 11 November 2006.

=== York City ===
Purkiss joined Conference National club York City on loan until the end of 2006–07 on 22 March 2007 in time for their play-off push. Purkiss had been considering a move to the club for some time and eventually agreed a deal that included a loan period and a four-figure sum for Gainsborough despite only five weeks remaining on his contract. Before signing, he had made 35 appearances for Gainsborough that season. Once at York Purkiss went straight into the first-team, making his debut as a substitute in York's 1–1 draw with Exeter City. He was offered a permanent contract with York at the end of the season after making eight appearances on loan. He finished 2007–08 with 46 appearances for York.

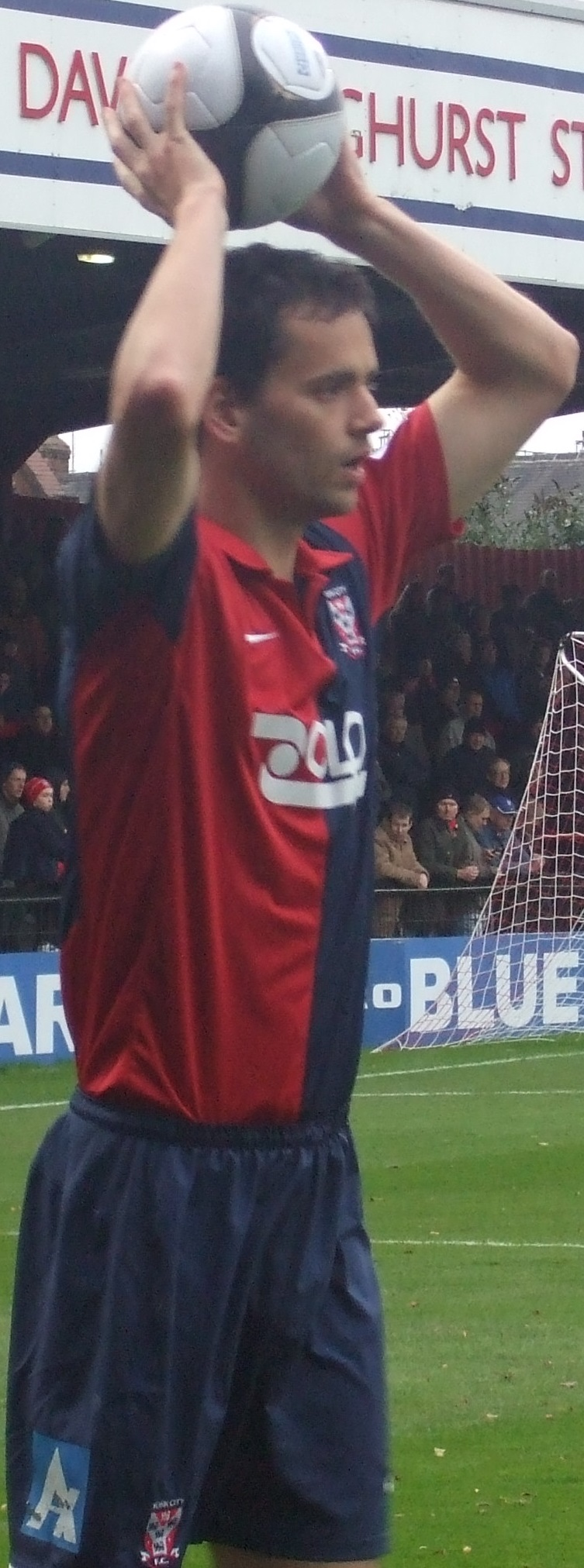
Purkiss playing for York City in 2008

Purkiss played in the 2009 FA Trophy final at Wembley Stadium on 9 May 2009, which York lost 2–0 to Stevenage Borough. He finished 2008–09 with 47 appearances and two goals for York and was offered a new contract by the club. He delayed signing as he wanted to see if the club would retain their key players, and he eventually signed a new one-year contract on 8 June. He meanwhile continued his studies, graduated from the College of Law in 2009, and represented Great Britain at the 2009 Summer Universiade in Serbia.

He started in the 2010 Conference Premier play-off final at Wembley on 16 May 2010, which was lost 3–1 to Oxford United. He finished 2009–10 with 47 appearances and one goal for York and was offered a new contract by the club, which he rejected.

=== Oxford United ===
He signed for Oxford on a two-year contract on 21 May following their promotion to League Two. He made his debut in a 0–0 draw with Wycombe Wanderers as an 11th-minute substitute on 21 August and his first start came in a 1–0 defeat away to West Ham United of the Premier League in the League Cup on 24 August. He was made available for loan by Oxford in March 2011 and told he could leave the club permanently in the summer. He eventually signed for Conference Premier club Darlington on a one-month loan on 5 August, and after making seven appearances the loan was extended for a further two months in September. He returned to Oxford in November following the expiry of his loan at Darlington.

=== Hereford United ===
Purkiss left Oxford on 24 January 2012 after being released from his contract and subsequently signed for League Two rivals Hereford United. He made 15 appearances for the club before leaving Edgar Street in the summer after Hereford were relegated out of the Football League.

=== Walsall ===
Purkiss signed for League One club Walsall on a one-year contract on 6 August 2012 after a successful trial; he rejoined his former Hereford boss Richard O'Kelly, who had just been appointed assistant manager at Walsall. He was dropped from the first-team in the first half of 2013–14 in favour of Mal Benning and then James Chambers. He signed a one-year contract extension in May 2014. He missed the start of 2014–15 with an ankle injury but returned to first-team action with good energy after working hard to maintain his fitness levels. He was named on the Football League team of the week for his performance in a 2–0 win at Doncaster Rovers on 7 February, having denied the home side an equaliser with a goal-line clearance. He made a third losing appearance at Wembley Stadium on 22 March, as Walsall lost 2–0 to Bristol City in the final of the Football League Trophy. Despite Purkiss showing good form during many of his 39 appearances throughout the campaign he was one of four players released by manager Dean Smith in May 2015.

"I thought I had probably done my time there. I felt like I went there as an attacking full back and almost was forced to convert into a defender. I feel like I walked off some games towards the back end of the season and people said I was playing well, but I didn't feel like I was contributing. For whatever reason I felt it didn't fit. The irony is they now do attack from full back. I reflect on it and think I did that all the time in my first season. In the second season I didn't play so much because he said he preferred a defensive option. We had a lot of conversations about the role of the full back. I used to think you could get forward every time and Dean was of the opposing view where you looked to really pick and choose."

— Purkiss speaking in December 2015, reflecting on his time at Walsall.

=== Port Vale ===
Purkiss signed a two-year contract with League One club Port Vale on 24 June 2015. Manager Rob Page signed him as a replacement for departing right-back Frédéric Veseli to provide competition to Adam Yates. He began 2015–16 as the club's first choice right-back, combining well with winger Byron Moore, and impressed in the role to the extent that Yates was sent out on loan. Page praised Purkiss for his performances early in the season, and said his signing allowed the club to play a more patient, passing game. He was named in The Football League Paper team of the day for his performance in a 1–1 draw with Scunthorpe United at Vale Park on 12 December. He was again named in The Football League Paper team of the day after playing at right-wing-back in a 2–0 win over Gillingham on 16 April 2016.

New manager Bruno Ribeiro appointed Purkiss as joint-captain, along with Jak Alnwick and Anthony Grant, in July 2016. He played 12 of the club's first 15 league matches of 2016–17, though was twice unexpectedly dropped from the matchday squad entirely despite not being injured on either occasion. Chairman Norman Smurthwaite confirmed that there had been an issue between Purkiss and Ribeiro. However, it was reported that Purkiss was unable to return to the first-team due to a shoulder injury. He made his return to action under caretaker manager Michael Brown on 30 December, days after Ribeiro's resignation. Pukiss went on to state that he had been genuinely injured and that rumours of a falling out with Ribeiro were an exaggeration. Vale were relegated at the end of the season, after which Purkiss questioned the fitness and conditioning of the squad. After a public vote held in December 2019, he was named by The Sentinel as Port Vale's third-best right-back of the 2010s with 11% of the vote, behind Adam Yates (62%) and James Gibbons (27%).

=== Swindon Town ===
On 28 June 2017, Purkiss signed for newly relegated League Two club Swindon Town on a free transfer, after turning down a new contract with Vale. On the opening day of the 2017–18 campaign, he made his Swindon debut during their 2–1 away victory against Carlisle United, featuring for the entire 90 minutes. He made 45 appearances throughout the campaign. He was sometimes played out of position at centre-back by "Robins" manager Phil Brown, before he was released in May 2018.

=== Return to Walsall ===
On 31 October 2018, Purkiss rejoined Walsall on non-contract terms. At the time he rejoined the club he was in rehabilitation from a neck injury, and instead of playing spent his time working on opposition analysis and peer support for younger members of the squad. Manager Dean Keates said that "he's made over 400 senior appearances and is chairman of the PFA, so he's an asset with a great affinity to the club".

== International career ==
Purkiss was named in the England national C team, who represent England at non-League level, in February 2009, for a friendly against Malta under-21s. However, he was forced to pull out of the team due to a stomach muscle injury. He was named on standby in May for an International Challenge Trophy match against Belgium under-21s.

He represented Great Britain at the 2009 Summer Universiade, playing in the Bronze Medal match against Japan. Purkiss has also represented the England national futsal team.

== Style of play ==
Purkiss plays as a right-back and speaking in 2010 Oxford manager Chris Wilder described him as "an athletic footballer who likes to get forward and join in".

== Chairmanship of PFA ==
Purkiss was elected as chairman of the Professional Footballers' Association (PFA) in November 2017, succeeding Ritchie Humphreys after five years on the management committee. He called for an independent review into the PFA and criticized numerous decisions made by the leadership, including a perceived lack of support and research into mental health issues and dementia. CEO Gordon Taylor was reported to have attempted to disbar Purkiss as chairman as he was not a contracted player at Walsall. In March 2019, it was reported that he was forced to stand down after the completion of a "full and open review" into the PFA's finances was presented at its 2019 AGM, along with its chief executive officer, Gordon Taylor and the PFA's entire management committee. However, by January 2020 both men were still in their posts, with the review ongoing. John Mousinho was elected as chairman of the newly formed Professional Footballers' Association (PFA) players' board in May 2021.

== Personal life ==
He is married to political commentator Marina Purkiss (née Nigrelli). They live in west London and have two children. Purkiss worked as an employment lawyer in the City of London after leaving his role in the PFA.

== Career statistics ==
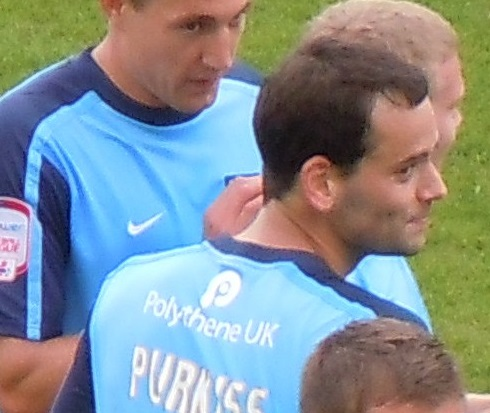
Purkiss playing for Oxford United in 2010

As of match played 14 April 2018

Appearances and goals by club, season and competition
Club	Season	League			FA Cup		League Cup		Other		Total	
Club	Season	Division	Apps	Goals	Apps	Goals	Apps	Goals	Apps	Goals	Apps	Goals
Gainsborough Trinity	2003–04	Northern Premier League; Premier Division	32	0	2	0	—		0	0	34	0
Gainsborough Trinity	2004–05	Conference North	37	1	0	0	—		0	0	37	1
Gainsborough Trinity	2005–06	Conference North	15	0	0	0	—		0	0	15	0
Gainsborough Trinity	2006–07	Conference North	29	0	4	0	—		2 (Note: Appearances in FA Trophy)	0	35	0
Gainsborough Trinity	Total		113	1	6	0	—		2	0	121	1
York City (loan)	2006–07	Conference National	8	0	—		—		0	0	8	0
York City	2007–08	Conference Premier	37	0	0	0	—		9 (Note: Seven appearances in FA Trophy, two in Conference League Cup)	0	46	0
York City	2008–09	Conference Premier	39	1	2	0	—		6 (Note: One appearance Conference League Cup, five appearances and one goal in FA Trophy)	1	47	2
York City	2009–10	Conference Premier	36	1	3	0	—		8 (Note: Five appearances in FA Trophy, three in Conference Premier play-offs)	0	47	1
York City	Total		120	2	5	0	—		23	1	148	3
Oxford United	2010–11	League Two	23	0	1	0	1	0	1 (Note: Appearance(s) in Football League Trophy)	0	26	0
Darlington (loan)	2011–12	Conference Premier	12	0	0	0	—		—		12	0
Hereford United	2011–12	League Two	15	0	—		—		—		15	0
Walsall	2012–13	League One	27	0	1	0	2	0	0	0	30	0
Walsall	2013–14	League One	14	0	2	0	0	0	0	0	16	0
Walsall	2014–15	League One	32	0	2	0	0	0	5	0	39	0
Walsall	Total		73	0	5	0	2	0	5	0	85	0
Port Vale	2015–16	League One	39	0	2	0	2	0	2	0	45	0
Port Vale	2016–17	League One	32	0	1	0	1	0	2 (Note: Appearance(s) in EFL Trophy)	0	36	0
Port Vale	Total		71	0	3	0	3	0	4	0	81	0
Swindon Town	2017–18	League Two	41	0	2	0	1	0	1	0	45	0
Walsall	2018–19	League One	0	0	0	0	0	0	0	0	0	0
Brentham	2021–22	Middlesex County League; Premier Division	18	0	0	0	—		7	0	25	0
Career total			486	3	22	0	7	0	43	1	558	4

== Honours ==
York City

- FA Trophy runner-up: 2009

Walsall

- Football League Trophy runner-up: 2015

Brentham

- Middlesex County FA Intermediate Cup runner-up: NW London
