= Tom Bradshaw (footballer, born 1992) =

Wales international footballer (born 1992)

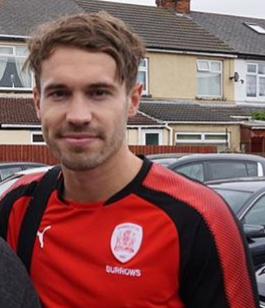
- Bradshaw with Barnsley in 2017

Personal information
- Full name: Thomas William Bradshaw
- Date of birth: 27 July 1992 (age 34)
- Place of birth: Shrewsbury, England
- Height: 1.88 m (6 ft 2 in)
- Position: Striker

Team information
- Current team: Rotherham United
- Number: 9

Youth career
- 2004–2008: Aberystwyth Town

Senior career*
Years	Team	Apps	(Gls)
2008–2009	Aberystwyth Town	9	(2)
2009–2014	Shrewsbury Town	89	(17)
2014–2016	Walsall	70	(34)
2016–2019	Barnsley	85	(18)
2018–2019	→ Millwall (loan)	10	(0)
2019–2025	Millwall	184	(43)
2025–2026	Oxford United	16	(0)
2026	→ Barnsley (loan)	19	(3)
2026–	Rotherham United	0	(0)

International career^{‡}
2010–2011	Wales U19	4	(2)
2011–2013	Wales U21	8	(1)
2016–2023	Wales	8	(0)
- * Club domestic league appearances and goals as of 5 August 2026 ‡ National team caps and goals as of 12 October 2023

Thomas William Bradshaw (born 27 July 1992) is a professional footballer who plays as a striker for EFL League Two club Rotherham United.

Born in England, he represents the Wales national team.

== Club career ==
=== Shrewsbury Town ===
Bradshaw started his career at Aberystwyth Town and was signed by Shrewsbury Town in May 2009. Aberystwyth later received a retrospective fee of £30,000 under the FIFA training compensation scheme.

He made his debut in a League Two match against Crewe Alexandra at Gresty Road on 10 April 2010, replacing Jamie Cureton for the final 15 minutes and scoring twice in a 3–0 victory. At the end of the 2009–10 season, he signed a two-year professional contract.

Despite scoring six goals during the 2010–11 season, Bradshaw found first-team opportunities more limited in 2011–12, making eight appearances and scoring once, against Accrington Stanley.

Bradshaw was given the number nine shirt for the 2012–13 campaign. He made 22 appearances, mostly as a substitute, but failed to score. He signed a contract extension of an undisclosed length on 23 May 2013 and scored his first senior goal for almost two years in a 2–0 home victory over Swindon Town on 17 August.

=== Walsall ===
On 23 June 2014, Bradshaw signed a two-year contract with League One club Walsall for an undisclosed fee, reportedly in the region of £50,000, following Shrewsbury's relegation to League Two.

He scored on his debut for Walsall in a 1–1 away draw against Port Vale on 9 August 2014. Bradshaw scored a last-minute equaliser against his former club Shrewsbury in a 2–2 FA Cup draw on 8 November.

He scored Walsall's second goal in their 2–0 victory over Preston North End in the first leg of the 2014–15 Football League Trophy Northern Area final on 7 January 2015. He subsequently started in the 2015 Football League Trophy final, Walsall's first match at Wembley Stadium, which ended in a 2–0 defeat to Bristol City.

Bradshaw scored his first senior hat-trick on 11 August 2015 in a 4–3 victory at Nottingham Forest in the first round of the League Cup.

After making his senior international debut for Wales and Walsall losing to Barnsley in the League One play-off semi-finals, Bradshaw submitted a transfer request in July 2016.

=== Barnsley ===
Bradshaw joined newly promoted Championship club Barnsley for an undisclosed fee on 14 July 2016.

He scored his first Barnsley goal in a 4–0 victory over Rotherham United on 27 August 2016. Bradshaw scored eight times during his first season and was the club's leading scorer with 12 goals in 2017–18, when Barnsley were relegated.

On 7 April 2018, he scored a late winning goal in a 3–2 victory over South Yorkshire rivals Sheffield United at Oakwell.

=== Millwall ===
On 23 August 2018, Bradshaw joined Millwall initially on loan until January 2019, when the transfer became permanent. He signed a long-term contract for an undisclosed fee which reportedly surpassed the club-record £800,000 paid for Paul Goddard in 1989.

His first season ended in November after he suffered a knee ligament injury against Brentford.

Bradshaw scored his first goal for Millwall on 13 August 2019 in a 2–1 League Cup victory away to West Bromwich Albion. Eleven days later, he scored his first league goal for the club with his first touch after coming on as a substitute, earning a 1–1 draw at Middlesbrough.

He was named the EFL Championship Player of the Month for February 2023 after scoring five goals during the month.

Bradshaw made more than 200 appearances in all competitions during his six-year association with Millwall.

=== Oxford United ===
On 16 January 2025, Bradshaw joined fellow Championship club Oxford United for an undisclosed fee.

In the second half of the 2025–26 season, Bradshaw returned to Barnsley on loan. He scored three goals during the spell, including twice against Rotherham United.

He left Oxford after the conclusion of the 2025–26 season.

=== Rotherham United ===
On 5 August 2026, Bradshaw joined EFL League Two club Rotherham United as a free agent. He signed a contract until the end of the 2026–27 season, with an option for a further year. The signing was announced as being subject to English Football League and Football Association ratification.

Bradshaw became Rotherham's ninth new signing following the opening of the summer transfer window and joined fellow newly signed forwards Paul Mullin and Fábio Tavares.

Following the move, Bradshaw said that he had previously come close to signing for Rotherham on several occasions. He also spoke of his familiarity with South Yorkshire from his spells with Barnsley, his intention to provide leadership to younger players and his personal target of scoring at least 15 goals during the season.

== International career ==
Born in Shrewsbury, England, Bradshaw grew up in Tywyn, Wales, and attended Ysgol Penglais School in Aberystwyth. He was therefore eligible to represent either Wales or England internationally.

Bradshaw was first called up to the Wales under-19 squad in September 2010 and scored on his debut in a 2–0 victory over Liechtenstein.

He subsequently represented the Wales under-21 team, scoring on his debut. Bradshaw won eight under-21 caps and made his final appearance in a goalless draw against Moldova on 10 September 2013.

Bradshaw was placed on standby for Wales's UEFA Euro 2016 qualifiers against Bosnia and Herzegovina and Cyprus in October 2014, but withdrew after suffering a hamstring injury.

He received his first senior call-up in November 2015 for a friendly against the Netherlands, but remained an unused substitute in a 3–2 defeat.

Bradshaw made his senior international debut on 28 March 2016, replacing Tom Lawrence during a 1–0 friendly defeat to Ukraine in Kyiv.

He was included in Chris Coleman's preliminary squad for UEFA Euro 2016, but withdrew because of a calf injury.

== Career statistics ==
=== Club ===
As of matches played 5 August 2026

Appearances and goals by club, season and competition
Club	Season	League			FA Cup		League Cup		Other		Total	
Club	Season	Division	Apps	Goals	Apps	Goals	Apps	Goals	Apps	Goals	Apps	Goals
Shrewsbury Town	2009–10	League Two	6	3	0	0	0	0	0	0	6	3
Shrewsbury Town	2010–11	League Two	26	6	0	0	1	0	3 (Note: One appearance in the Football League Trophy and two appearances in the League Two play-offs)	0	30	6
Shrewsbury Town	2011–12	League Two	8	1	0	0	1	0	1 (Note: Appearance(s) in the Football League Trophy)	0	10	1
Shrewsbury Town	2012–13	League One	21	0	0	0	1	0	0	0	22	0
Shrewsbury Town	2013–14	League One	28	7	1	0	1	0	0	0	30	7
Shrewsbury Town	Total		89	17	1	0	4	0	4	0	98	17
Walsall	2014–15	League One	29	17	1	2	2	0	5	1	37	20
Walsall	2015–16	League One	41	17	3	0	2	3	3 (Note: One appearance in the Football League Trophy and two appearances in the League One play-offs)	0	49	20
Walsall	Total		70	34	4	2	4	3	8	1	86	40
Barnsley	2016–17	Championship	42	8	2	0	1	0	—		45	8
Barnsley	2017–18	Championship	39	9	1	0	3	3	—		43	12
Barnsley	2018–19	League One	4	1	0	0	1	0	0	0	5	1
Barnsley	Total		85	18	3	0	5	3	0	0	93	21
Millwall (loan)	2018–19	Championship	10	0	—		—		—		10	0
Millwall	2019–20	Championship	45	8	2	1	1	1	—		48	10
Millwall	2020–21	Championship	29	4	2	0	2	0	—		33	4
Millwall	2021–22	Championship	24	9	1	0	3	0	—		28	9
Millwall	2022–23	Championship	41	17	1	0	1	0	—		43	17
Millwall	2023–24	Championship	34	4	1	0	1	0	—		36	4
Millwall	2024–25	Championship	11	1	0	0	2	0	—		13	1
Millwall	Total		184	43	7	1	10	1	—		201	44
Oxford United	2024–25	Championship	11	0	0	0	0	0	—		11	0
Oxford United	2025–26	Championship	5	0	0	0	2	0	—		7	0
Oxford United	Total		16	0	0	0	2	0	—		18	0
Barnsley (loan)	2025–26	League One	18	3	—		—		—		18	3
Rotherham United	2026–27	League Two	0	0	0	0	0	0	0	0	0	0
Career total			471	115	15	3	25	7	12	1	524	126

== Honours ==
Walsall

- Football League Trophy runner-up: 2014–15

Wales

- China Cup runner-up: 2018

Individual

- Championship Player of the Month: February 2023
