= Marina Purkiss =

British political commentator

- Born: Marina Nigrelli
- Education: University of Portsmouth
- Spouse: Ben Purkiss
- Children: 2

Marina Purkiss (née Nigrelli) is a British political commentator who rose to prominence in 2022 with commentaries on politics and current affairs on mainstream television, including Jeremy Vine on Channel 5 and Good Morning Britain on ITV.

== Biography ==
Purkiss was born in the UK to Italian parents. She grew up in Harrow, and made an early appearance on a BBC website as an inconsolable fan after Italy was knocked out of the 2002 FIFA World Cup in the round of 16. Purkiss graduated from the University of Portsmouth with a degree in marketing in 2007, and then worked as a marketing manager for 15 years.

Purkiss first became politically engaged in 2016, following the EU referendum, using social media as a platform for commentary. Purkiss has over 400,000 followers on Twitter, is a contributor to Byline Times, and co-hosts a 'politically charged (but fun)' podcast, The Trawl, with Jemma Forte.

In April 2023, a discussion between Purkiss and Conservative politician Jacob Rees Mogg on GB News went viral. She later stated that she would never appear on GB News again. Later that week, Purkiss was a guest for the first time on the topical BBC TV panel game Have I Got News For You.

== Personal life ==
Purkiss is married to Ben Purkiss, a former professional footballer. They have two children and live in London. She was previously engaged to footballer Richard Lee with whom she appeared on Channel 4's Couples Come Dine With Me on 7 May 2015.
