= Mick Russell (referee) =

English football referee

Michael Russell
- Full name: Michael Russell
- Born: April 20, 1965 (age 61)

Domestic
Years	League	Role
2001–	English Football League	Referee

Michael Russell (born 20 April 1965) is a Scottish amateur football referee who officiates in all four leagues of the Football League having made his debut as a referee in 2001. He represents Hertfordshire FA.

On 29 December 2012, he gave two yellow cards to Sheffield Wednesday's Jérémy Hélan, which is supposed to result in a sending off. It was later reported that Russell had inadvertently noted the first yellow card as being for Michail Antonio and hence did not realise that Hélan had had two yellow cards. He was taken off duty for his next scheduled fixture as a result.

In March 2015, he refereed the 2015 Football League Trophy Final at Wembley between Bristol City and Walsall.
