= 2015 Football League Trophy final =

2015 Football League Trophy Final
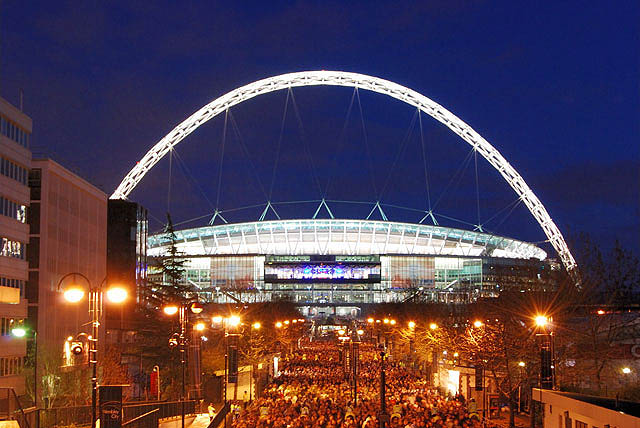
- The final took place at Wembley Stadium
- Event: 2014–15 Football League Trophy
Walsall	Bristol City
0	2
- Date: 22 March 2015
- Venue: Wembley Stadium, London
- Man of the Match: Mark Little (Bristol City)
- Referee: Mick Russell
- Attendance: 72,315

The 2015 Football League Trophy Final was the 32nd final of the domestic cup involving the 48 teams from Football League One and Football League Two, the respective third and fourth tiers of English football.

The final took place at Wembley Stadium in London on 22 March 2015 with Bristol City winning their third title with a 2–0 win over Walsall, who were making their first appearance at Wembley in their 127-year history. The third win made Bristol City the most successful team in the history of the tournament.

The match was refereed by Mick Russell.

== Background ==
At the time of the final, Bristol City were 10 points clear at the top of the League One table, 37 above Walsall. Bristol City had previously played at Wembley in 2008, when they lost the Championship playoff final to Hull City.

== Route to the final ==
=== Walsall ===
Walsall, of League One, arrived in the final as winners of the Northern section. They were given a bye in the first round, and started in the second round on 7 October 2014 with a 1–0 away win over fellow League One team Rochdale at Spotland, Mathieu Manset scoring the only goal in the 23rd minute. On 12 November, in the quarter-finals, Walsall hosted Sheffield United and again won by a single goal, from Romaine Sawyers.

On 9 December in the semi-finals, they travelled to Prenton Park to play League Two Tranmere Rovers, and trailed 0–2 at half time after conceding from Max Power and Kayode Odejayi. In the second half, they equalised with goals by Anthony Forde and Michael Cain. The score remained the same throughout extra time, and the game went to a penalty shootout, in which the first to miss was Walsall's Ashley Grimes, whose shot was saved by Tranmere's Owain Fôn Williams. However, Tranmere's Liam Ridehalgh hit the crossbar and Marc Laird's attempt was saved by Walsall goalkeeper Richard O'Donnell, then Paul Downing scored to put Walsall through.

In the Northern section final, Walsall played Preston North End over two legs. The first, away at Deepdale on 7 January 2015, was a 2–0 win for Walsall with late goals by a Forde free kick and Tom Bradshaw intercepting a backwards pass by Scott Wiseman. A goalless draw 20 days later in the second game at the Bescot Stadium confirmed Walsall's place in the final.

=== Bristol City ===
Bristol City, also of League One, were also given a bye in the first round of the Southern section, so began on 8 October in the second round away to League Two Cheltenham Town at Whaddon Road. They won 3–1, with Wes Burns scoring the first goal and Korey Smith the other two. On 11 November in the quarter-finals at Ashton Gate, they defeated another fourth-tier team, AFC Wimbledon, 2–1. Aaron Wilbraham scored two late goals, despite a consolation by George Francomb. In the semi-finals on 10 December, again at home, Bristol City won 2–0 against Coventry City with a goal in either half from Derrick Williams and Wilbraham.

In the Southern final against Gillingham, Bristol City won the first leg 4–2 at Priestfield Stadium on 6 January 2015: Cody McDonald scored twice for the hosts, but Matt Smith netted four times for the visitors. In the second leg on the 29th, Matt Smith opened the scoring and Jermaine McGlashan equalised in the first half, but Bristol City nonetheless advanced 5–3 on aggregate.

== Match ==
=== Pre-match ===
Supporters of Bristol City and their local rival Bristol Rovers walked 100 miles to the match over four-and-a-half days, to raise money for private surgery for six-year-old mascot Oskar Pycroft. Pycroft has cerebral palsy and surgery could result in him being able to walk.

=== Synopsis ===
Bristol City gained the lead after 15 minutes, Aden Flint heading a Marlon Pack corner past Walsall goalkeeper Richard O'Donnell. Walsall then had chances to equalise by Sam Mantom and Andy Taylor. Five minutes into the second half, Mark Little, a winner in the previous season's final with Peterborough United, scored a second after O'Donnell had saved his header. Walsall's Jordan Cook hit the post, and Bristol City's Aaron Wilbraham had a goal disallowed for offside.

=== Details ===
22 March 2015
15:30 GMT

Walsall	0–2	Bristol City
	Report	Flint 15'; Little 51'

Wembley Stadium, London
Attendance: 72,315
Referee: Mick Russell

Walsall	Bristol City

GK	1	(England) Richard O'Donnell
RB	2	(England) Ben Purkiss
CB	15	(England) James Chambers
CB	6	(England) Paul Downing
LB	3	(England) Andy Taylor
CM	7	(England) Adam Chambers (c)
CM	8	(England) Sam Mantom
RW	27	(Republic of Ireland) Anthony Forde		(substituted off) 74'
AM	10	(Saint Kitts and Nevis) Romaine Sawyers	(yellow card) 38'
LW	21	(England) Jordan Cook		(substituted off) 81'
CF	9	(Wales) Tom Bradshaw		(substituted off) 62'
Substitutes:
GK	13	(England) Craig MacGillivray
DF	4	(England) James O'Connor
MF	11	(England) James Baxendale		(substituted on) 81'
MF	12	(England) Michael Cain
MF	17	(England) Reece Flanagan
FW	24	(England) Ashley Grimes		(substituted on) 74'
FW	30	(England) Jordy Hiwula		(substituted on) 62'
Manager:
(England) Dean Smith

GK	1	(England) Frank Fielding
CB	22	(England) Luke Ayling
CB	4	(England) Aden Flint
CB	3	(Republic of Ireland) Derrick Williams
RM	2	(England) Mark Little
CM	7	(England) Korey Smith
CM	21	(England) Marlon Pack
LM	23	(England) Joe Bryan	(substituted off) 87'
AM	15	(England) Luke Freeman	(substituted off) 90'
CF	18	(England) Aaron Wilbraham
CF	19	(England) Kieran Agard	(substituted off) 89'
Substitutes:
GK	13	(Wales) Dave Richards
DF	17	(Republic of Ireland) Greg Cunningham	(substituted on) 87'
DF	24	(England) James Tavernier
MF	8	(England) Wade Elliott	(substituted on) 90'
MF	11	(England) Scott Wagstaff
MF	12	(England) George Saville
FW	10	(England) Jay-Emmanuel Thomas	(substituted on) 89'
Manager:
(England) Steve Cotterill

=== Post-match ===
Bristol City manager Steve Cotterill said that despite the gap between the two teams in the league table, Walsall were a difficult side to beat. He said that for a lot of his players, it would be the start of their careers. His Walsall counterpart Dean Smith expressed disappointment with his team's performance, saying that for reasons of height it was likely that they would concede from a corner. He added that nerves may have played a part in the defeat, as most of his players were young and had never played in front of such a large crowd before.
