= Ben George =

English footballer

Personal information
- Full name: Ben William George
- Date of birth: 14 November 1993 (age 32)
- Place of birth: Birmingham, England
- Position: Defender

Team information
- Current team: Sutton Coldfield Town

Senior career*
Years	Team	Apps	(Gls)
2012–2014	Walsall	1	(0)
2014	Chasetown		
2014–2015	Rugby Town	25	(1)
2015–2017	Leamington	60	(2)
2017–2018	Stamford	45	(7)
2018–	Sutton Coldfield Town		
- * Club domestic league appearances and goals as of 2018 (UTC)

Ben William George (born 14 November 1993) is an English former professional footballer who plays for Sutton Coldfield Town. A right back, he started his career at Walsall, before dropping into non-League football and playing for Chasetown, Rugby Town, Leamington and Stamford.

== Career ==
Walsall signed George from their youth team in June 2012. He made his professional debut in a 0–0 draw away at Brentford in February 2013. He played the full 90 minutes and earned praise from manager Dean Smith for his performance. However, Walsall released George in May 2014 with no further appearances.

George then signed with Chasetown, but moved on to Rugby Town in September. George made 25 league appearances for the club during the 2014–15 season. In June 2015, he signed for Leamington, a club he had previously had a trial with after leaving Walsall. After regular appearances in his first season, George struggled in competition with Richard Taundry for game time at right wing-back. He then moved on to Stamford for the 2017–18 season. Made 45 appearances for the club in a season where the narrowly missed out on promotion to bedworth in the play off final, and left the club after being unable to commit to training twice a week. He subsequently signed for Sutton Coldfield Town and was immediately in the starting 11.
