= Troy Hewitt =

English footballer

Personal information
- Full name: Troy Roger Hewitt
- Date of birth: 10 February 1990 (age 36)
- Place of birth: Newham, England
- Position: Striker

Youth career
- Clapton

Senior career*
| Years | Team | Apps | (Gls) |
| 2009–2010 | Ilford | 37 | (13) |
| 2010–2011 | Harrow Borough | 30 | (20) |
| 2011–2013 | Queens Park Rangers | 0 | (0) |
| 2011 | → Dagenham & Redbridge (loan) | 6 | (0) |
| 2012–2013 | → Bury (loan) | 8 | (2) |
| 2013 | → Colchester United (loan) | 1 | (0) |
| 2013–2014 | Walsall | 27 | (0) |
- * Club domestic league appearances and goals

Troy Roger Hewitt (born 10 February 1990) is an English former footballer.

== Career ==
=== Early career ===
Hewitt started his career at the age of eight playing for Eastlea colts and then went on to play for Pro Hawks FC in early teens then joining local side Clapton before moving to Ilford.

=== Harrow Borough ===
In the summer of 2010, Hewitt joined Isthmian League Premier Division side Harrow Borough. After impressing throughout the season, scoring 20 goals in 30 league games and earning himself a nomination for Player of the Round in the FA Cup fourth round qualifying due to a hat-trick at Conference National side Easbourne Borough, Hewitt was offered a trial at Queens Park Rangers in February 2011.

=== Queens Park Rangers ===
After a two-week spell, Queens Park Rangers (QPR) boss Neil Warnock decided to offer Hewitt a two-and-a-half-year contract. Hewitt joined on 23 February 2011. There was a financial agreement between the two clubs with Queens Park Rangers also promising to play a pre season fixture against the local side in the summer of 2011. QPR officially announced the signing on 14 March after some paperwork issues. Hewitt was given the number 42 shirt. He made his debut on 23 August, in the 2–0 home loss to Rochdale in the League Cup, coming on as a 73rd minute substitute for Lee Cook. During the season, Hewitt appeared on the bench twice, but was unused. At the end of the 2012–13 season, Hewitt was released by the club, along with several players.

=== Loan spells ===
On 30 September 2011, Hewitt joined League Two club Dagenham & Redbridge on an emergency loan deal. Shortly joining Dagenham & Redbridge, he made his debut, coming on as a substitute, in a 2–1 win over Crewe Alexandra. After one month at the club, Manager John Still has decided not to extend Hewitt's loan and made a total of seven appearances.

The following season in late October, Hewitt joined League One strugglers Bury. The next day, Hewitt appeared on the bench, but wasn't used in a 2–1 win over Hartlepool United. Four days later, he made his debut, coming on as a substitute, in a 1–1 draw over Walsall. On 20 November 2012, Hewitt scored his first goal for the club in a 2–1 win over Scunthorpe United and scored another four days later in a 2–2 draw against Bournemouth. With six appearances and scoring six, Hewitt loan spell was extended until 3 January 2012 In the second round of a FA Cup in the 1–1 draw against Southend United, Hewitt set up a goal for Matt Doherty to earn a replay match. However, Bury was eliminated after losing 4–3 on penalties, even Hewitt took a penalty but missed. By January, Hewitt future at Bury became in doubt after the club placed in transfer embargo over the club's financial trouble Hewitt loan spell at Bury was extended until 22 January 2013, which approved by The Football League. After the loan was extended, Hewitt continued to be in the regular first team until leaving the club on 22 January 2013.

In March 2013, Hewitt joined Colchester United on loan, that will keep him until the end of the season. Days after signing for the club, Hewitt made his debut for the club, coming on for Clinton Morrison as a substitute, in a 2–1 loss against Crewe.

=== Walsall ===
Following his release from QPR, Hewitt joined Walsall on a one-year contract on 16 July 2013, along with Milan Lalkovič. He scored his first goal for Walsall in a Football League Trophy tie against Wolverhampton Wanderers on 4 September 2013.
