= Daniel Lewis =

Daniel, Dan or Danny Lewis may refer to:

== Arts and entertainment ==
- Daniel Lewis (conductor) (1925–2017), American orchestral conductor
- Daniel Lewis (choreographer) (born 1944), American choreographer; Dean of Dance at the New World School of the Arts
- Dan Lewis (newsreader) (born 1950), American television reporter
- Daniel Vee Lewis (born 1959), American musician and bassist for World Entertainment War
- Danny J Lewis (fl. 1998), English house and garage music producer
- Dan Lewis, 2021 fictional character played by John Bishop

== Science ==
- Dan Lewis (botanist) (1910–2009), British botanist

== Sports ==
- Dan Lewis (rugby league) (fl. 1900s–1910s), Welsh rugby league footballer
- Dan Lewis (footballer) (1902–1965), Welsh football goalkeeper
- Jim Lewis (footballer, born 1909) (Daniel James Lewis, 1909–1980), Welsh footballer
- Dan Lewis (American football) (1936–2015), American football running back
- Danny Lewis (basketball) (born 1970), American basketball player
- Daniel Lewis (volleyball) (born 1976), Canadian volleyball player
- Daniel Lewis (footballer) (born 1982), English footballer
- Daniel Lewis (triple jumper) (born 1989), English athlete
- Daniel Lewis (boxer) (born 1993), Australian boxer

== See also ==
- Daniel Louis (born 1953), Canadian film producer
- Daniel Day-Lewis (born 1957), actor
- Daniel Lewis Lee (1973–2020), American white supremacist and convicted murderer
