= 2018 FA Trophy final =

2018 FA Trophy Final
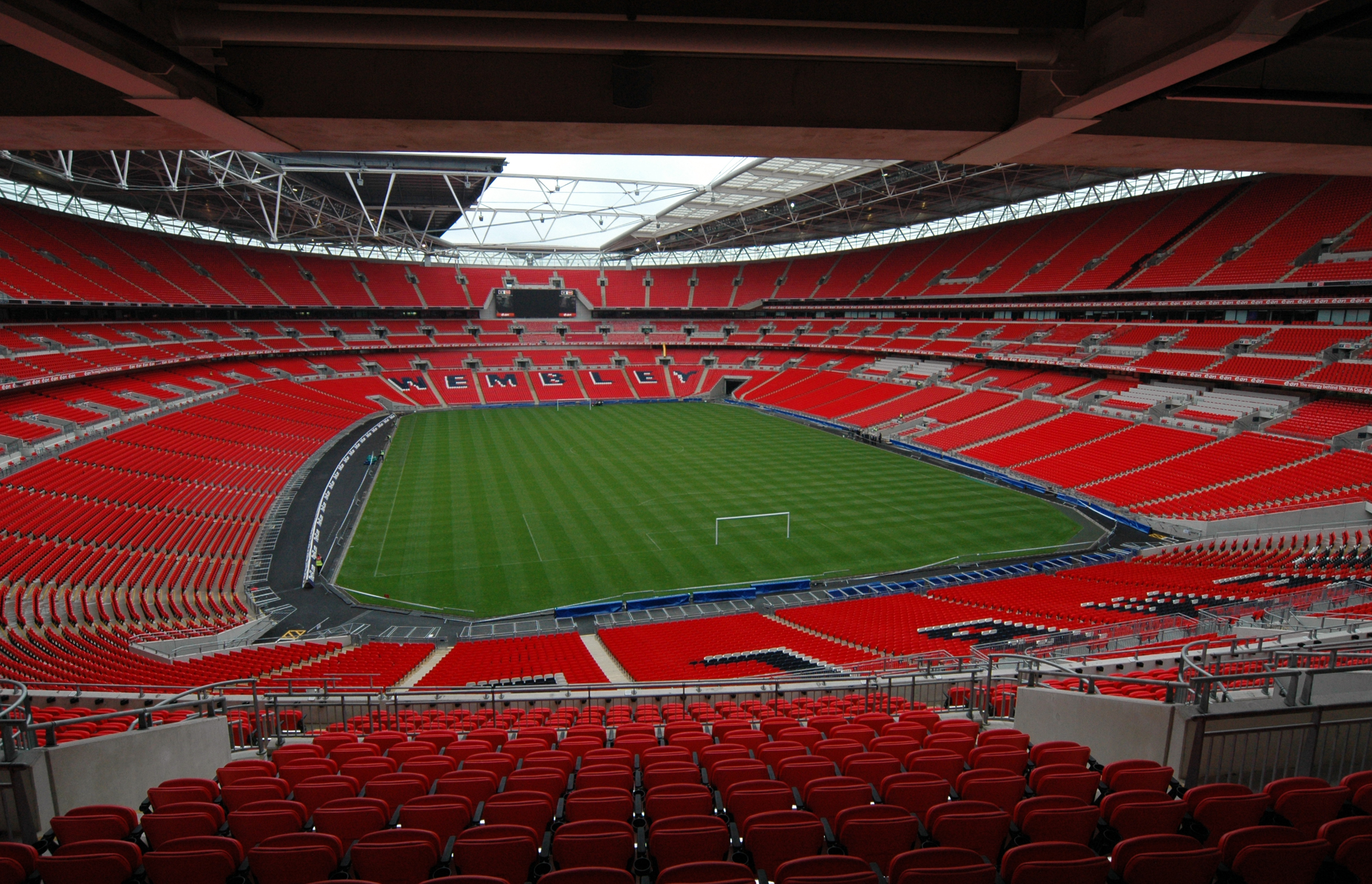
- Wembley Stadium hosted the final
- Event: 2017–18 FA Trophy
Brackley Town	Bromley
1	1
- After extra time Brackley Town won 5–4 on penalties
- Date: 20 May 2018
- Venue: Wembley Stadium, Wembley, London
- Referee: Chris Kavanagh
- Attendance: 31,430
- Weather: Sunny

The 2018 FA Trophy Final was a football match between Brackley Town and Bromley on 20 May 2018. It was the final match of the 2017–18 FA Trophy, the 49th season of the FA Trophy. Both teams were making their first appearances in the final.

== Route to the final ==
=== Brackley Town ===
25 November 2017 Third round qualifying	Brackley Town	4–0	Salford City	Brackley
15:00				Stadium: St. James Park; Attendance: 428

16 December 2017 First round	Braintree Town	0–0	Brackley Town	Braintree
15:00				Stadium: Cressing Road; Attendance: 249

19 December 2017 First round replay	Brackley Town	2–0	Braintree Town	Brackley
19:45				Stadium: St. James Park; Attendance: 238

13 January 2018 Seceond round	Brackley Town	0–0	Barrow	Brackley
15:00				Stadium: St. James Park; Attendance: 512

16 January 2018 Second round replay	Barrow	0–2	Brackley Town	Barrow-in-Furness
19:45				Stadium: Holker Street; Attendance: 430

3 February 2018 Third round	Brackley Town	3–1	Sutton United	Brackley
15:00				Stadium: St. James Park; Attendance: 767

24 February 2018 Quarter-Final	Stockport County	1–1	Brackley Town	Stockport
15:00				Stadium: Edgeley Park; Attendance: 2,213

27 February 2018 Quarter-Final Replay	Brackley Town	Postponed	Stockport County	Brackley
19:45				Stadium: St. James Park

6 March 2018 Quarter-Final Replay	Brackley Town	2–1	Stockport County	Brackley
19:45				Stadium: St. James Park; Attendance: 560

17 March 2018 Semi-Final First Leg	Brackley Town	1–0	Wealdstone	Brackley
15:00	Gudger 82'			Stadium: St. James Park; Attendance: 1,250; Referee: Charles Breakspear

24 March 2018 Semi-Final Second Leg	Wealdstone	0–2 (0–3 agg.)	Brackley Town	Ruislip
15:00			Byrne 55'; Aaron Williams	Stadium: Grosvenor Vale; Attendance: 2,008; Referee: Gavin Ward

=== Bromley ===
16 December 2017 First round	Hartley Wintney	0–2	Bromley	Hartley Wintney
15:00				Stadium: The Memorial Playing Fields; Attendance: 482

13 January 2018 Second round	Blyth Spartans	1–4	Bromley	Blyth
15:00				Stadium: Croft Park; Attendance: 647

3 February 2018 Third round	Workington	1–1	Bromley	Workington
15:00				Stadium: Borough Park; Attendance: 890

6 February 2018 Third round replay	Bromley	7–1	Workington	Bromley
19:45				Stadium: Hayes Lane; Attendance: 604

24 February 2018 Quarter-Final	Bromley	0–0	Spennymoor Town	Bromley
15:00				Stadium: Hayes Lane; Attendance: 1,504

27 February 2018 Quarter-Final Replay	Spennymoor Town	Postponed	Bromley	Spennymoor
19:45				Stadium: The Brewery Field

6 March 2018 Quarter-Final Replay	Spennymoor Town	Postponed	Bromley	Spennymoor
19:45				Stadium: The Brewery Field

13 March 2018 Quarter-Final Replay	Spennymoor Town	Postponed	Bromley	Spennymoor
19:45				Stadium: The Brewery Field

14 March 2018 Quarter-Final Replay	Spennymoor Town	1–2	Bromley	Darlington
19:45				Stadium: Blackwell Meadows; Attendance: 802

17 March 2018 Semi-Final First Leg	Bromley	3–2	Gateshead	Bromley
15:00	Hanlan 15' (pen.); Dennis 51' 82'		Peniket 1'; Johnson 40'	Stadium: Hayes Lane; Attendance: 1,254; Referee: Dean Whitestone

24 March 2018 Semi-Final Second Leg	Gateshead	1–1 (3–4 agg.)	Bromley	Gateshead
15:00	Barrow 69'		Kerr 5' (o.g.)	Stadium: International Stadium; Attendance: 2,264; Referee: Ben Toner

== Match ==
=== Details ===
20 May 2018
16:15 BST

Brackley Town	1–1 (a.e.t.)	Bromley
Johnson 90+6' (o.g.)	Report	Bugiel 19'
Penalties
Byrne (penalty missed); Williams (penalty scored); Diggin (penalty scored); Armson (penalty scored); G. Walker (penalty scored); Brown (penalty scored)	5–4	Sutherland (penalty scored); Raymond (penalty scored); Hanlan (penalty scored); Rees (penalty scored); Bugiel (penalty missed); Holland (penalty missed)

Wembley Stadium, London
Attendance: 31,430
Referee: Chris Kavanagh

GK	1	(England) Danny Lewis
DF	5	(England) Alex Gudger
DF	6	(England) Gaz Dean (c)
DF	3	(England) Connor Franklin (substituted off) 78'
MF	2	(England) Matt Lowe (substituted off) 111'
MF	7	(England) Glenn Walker
MF	4	(Republic of Ireland) Shane Byrne
MF	8	(England) James Armson
MF	11	(England) Adam Walker
FW	9	(Zimbabwe) Lee Ndlovu (substituted off) 53'
FW	10	(England) Aaron Williams
Substitutes:
DF	12	(England) Ellis Myles (substituted on) 78'
FW	14	(England) Andy Brown (substituted on) 53'
DF	15	(England) Luke Graham
DF	16	(England) Theo Streete
FW	17	(England) Steve Diggin (substituted on) 111'
Manager:
(England) Kevin Wilkin

GK	1	(England) David Gregory
DF	14	(England) Jordan Higgs
DF	6	(England) Jack Holland (c)
DF	19	(England) Roger Johnson
DF	16	(Grenada) Tyrone Sterling
MF	21	(Republic of Ireland) Frankie Sutherland
MF	11	(Wales) Adam Mekki (substituted off) 72'
MF	8	(England) Frankie Raymond
FW	18	(England) George Porter (substituted off) 61'
FW	25	(Lebanon) Omar Bugiel
FW	10	(England) Louis Dennis (substituted off) 68'
Substitutes:
DF	2	(Republic of Ireland) Alan Dunne
MF	4	(England) Josh Rees (substituted on) 61'
DF	5	(England) Ben Chorley (substituted on) 72'
FW	9	(England) Brandon Hanlan (substituted on) 68'
DF	17	(England) Dan Johnson
Manager:
(England) Neil Smith

Man of the match

Match officials

- Referee: Chris Kavanagh
- Assistant referees: Dan Cook & Daniel Bobathan
- Fourth Official: Michael Salisbury

Match rules

- 90 minutes.
- 30 minutes of extra-time if necessary.
- Penalty shoot-out if scores still level.
- Five named substitutes.
- Maximum of three substitutions.
