= List of provosts of King's College, Cambridge =

The following persons have served as Provost of King's College, Cambridge since its foundation in 1441.

	Provost	Appointed
1	William Millington	1441
2	John Chedworth	1447
3	Robert Wodelark	1452
4	Walter Field	1479
5	John Dogget	1499
6	John Argentine	1501
7	Richard Hatton	1508
8	Robert Hacomblen	1509
9	Edward Fox	1528
10	George Day	1538
11	John Cheke	1549
12	Richard Atkinson	1553
13	Robert Brassie	1556
14	Philip Baker	1558
15	Roger Goad	1570
16	Fogge Newton	1610
17	William Smith	1612
18	Samuel Collins	1615
19	Benjamin Whichcote	1645
20	James Fleetwood	1660
21	Thomas Page	1676
22	John Coplestone	1681
23	Charles Roderick	1689
24	John Adams	1712
25	Andrew Snape	1720
26	William George	1743
27	John Sumner	1756
28	William Cooke	1772
29	Humphrey Sumner	1797
30	George Thackeray	1814
31	Richard Okes	1850
32	Augustus Austen Leigh	1889
33	Montague Rhodes James	1905
34	Walter Durnford	1918
35	Alan England Brooke	1926
36	John Tresidder Sheppard	1933
37	Stephen Glanville	1954
38	Noel Annan	1956
39	Edmund Leach	1966
40	Bernard Williams	1979
41	Patrick Bateson	1988
42	Judith Mayhew-Jonas	2003
	Tess Adkins (acting)	2005
43	Ross Harrison	2006
44	Michael Proctor	2013
45	Gillian Tett	2023
