= Ross Harrison =

Ross Harrison may refer to:

- Ross Granville Harrison (1870–1959), US biologist and anatomist
- Ross Harrison (academic) (born 1943), British philosopher and academic
- Ross Harrison (rugby union) (born 1992), British rugby union player
