= Dennis Lloyd, Baron Lloyd of Hampstead =

British jurist (1915–1992)

Lloyd in 1965, by Walter Bird

Dennis Lloyd, Baron Lloyd of Hampstead (22 October 1915 – 31 December 1992) was a British jurist, and was created a life peer on 14 May 1965 as Baron Lloyd of Hampstead, of Hampstead in the London Borough of Camden.

He was appointed Quain Professor of Law at the University of London in 1956, and Head of Department of Laws from 1969 to 1981. He became a Queen's Counsel in 1975. He was an architect of the Rent Act of 1965.

== Publications ==
- The Idea of Law (1964)
- Introduction to Jurisprudence (1959)
