= Gail Taylor =

British plant biologist

Gail Taylor is a British plant scientist. She was Distinguished Professor and John B Orr Endowed Professor in Environmental Plant Sciences at University of California, Davis until spring 2024 when she became Dean of Life Sciences and Quain Professor of Botany at University College London.

== Early life and education ==
Taylor was first inspired by plants in her grandmother's garden when she was a child. Her grandmother taught her the food storage methods of pickling, preserving, and using a cellar. Her two favourite plants are lettuce and watercress.

She went to Lancaster University and received a BSc in Biological Sciences, specialising in plant science, genetics, and ecology in 1983, and a PhD in plant biology in 1986.

== Career ==
From 1986 to 1990, Taylor was a post-doctoral research fellow at the Forestry Commission, England. She then worked as a Plant Biology lecturer at the University of Sussex, becoming a senior lecturer in 1997, and left to work as a senior lecturer of Biodiversity and Ecology at the University of Southampton in 1999. In 2004, Taylor became a professor of Plant Sciences at the University of Southampton and eventually became a director of research for Biological Sciences. In 2015, while at the University of Southampton, she became one of ten trustees of the Annals of Botany Company, which is the world's oldest plant science journal and is a global leader of plant biology research.

In 2017, Taylor moved to the US to be the department chair and a professor of Plant Sciences at University of California, Davis. She expanded, reorganised, and increased income for the department, and was a member of the leadership team for the new Agricultural Innovation Center. She was awarded the John B. Orr Endowed Professorship in Environmental Plant Sciences in 2020 for her research on adapting plants to be more nutritious, strengthening plant cultivation through environmental agriculture, and developing poplar trees into biofuel. This award made her one of five women in the Plant Science Department to hold endowed chair positions as of 2024, which the department called a "historic achievement." Taylor left her position at U.C. Davis to become the Dean of Life Sciences at University College London, starting in Autumn 2024.

In her career, Taylor has published about 330 papers and been cited over 16,000 times; she has also already published four papers in 2024. She has contributed a large volume of work to the plant sciences industry and helped build departments and research centers along the way.

=== Research ===
Taylor's research has focused on leafy green crops and bioenergy. She has researched molecular breeding for lettuce and watercress, improving shelf life of lettuce with physiology and genetics, the genetics of the leafy green and microbe relationship, and produced the first genomic information on watercress. She has also researched the development and delivery of trees to be used for biofuel, and the molecular adaptations plants have made to the increasing carbon dioxide in the atmosphere.

== Achievements ==
Taylor Taylor became the director and a trustee of the Vitacress Conservation Trust in 2007. She became a Fellow of the Royal Society of Biology in 2014.

== Personal life ==
Taylor is a mother to two children.
