= Walter Durnford =

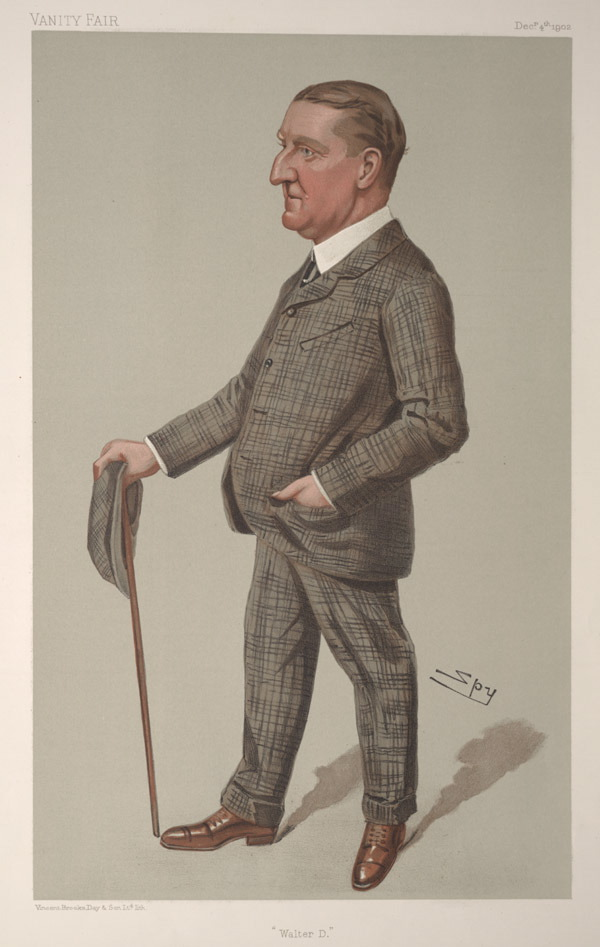
Walter Durnford, 1902 caricature

Sir Walter Durnford GBE VD JP (b Middleton 21 February 1847 – d Cambridge 7 April 1926) was an English academic.

The son of Bishop Richard Durnford he was educated at Eton College. He entered King's College, Cambridge in 1865, graduating B.A in 1869 and M.A in 1890. He was appointed a Fellow of Kings in 1869. He was on the staff of Eton from 1870 to 1899. He was Mayor of Cambridge in 1905; and Provost of King's College, Cambridge from 1918 until his death.
