= Daniel Lewis (footballer) =

English footballer

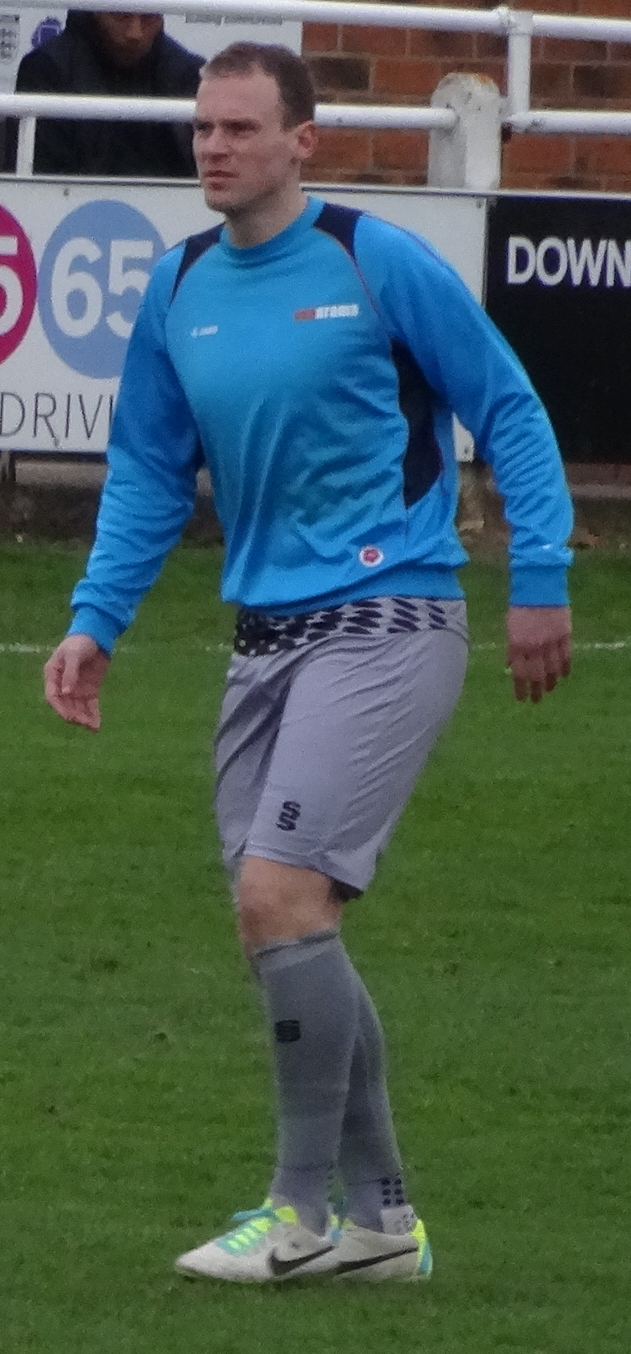
- Lewis warming up for Solihull Moors in 2017

Personal information
- Full name: Daniel Paul Lewis
- Date of birth: 18 June 1982 (age 44)
- Place of birth: Redditch, England
- Position: Goalkeeper

Youth career
- Alvechurch

Senior career*
Years	Team	Apps	(Gls)
2002–2004	Studley		
2004–2006	Kidderminster Harriers	16	(0)
2006–2007	Moor Green		
2007–2010	Redditch United		
2010–2015	Kidderminster Harriers	169	(0)
2015–2017	Solihull Moors	49	(0)
2017–2024	Brackley Town	199	(0)
- * Club domestic league appearances and goals

Daniel Paul Lewis (born 18 June 1982) is an English retired footballer who played as a goalkeeper. His last club was Brackley Town.

== Career ==
Born in Redditch, Worcestershire, Lewis played for the youth team of Alvechurch and went on to play for Bromsgrove Sunday team Garringtons, where he conceded 40 goals in 37 games. He left in 2002 for Studley and forced his way into the team, but had a trial at Kidderminster Harriers and joined them in May 2004. His Football League debut came in a 3–0 defeat to Northampton Town on 7 May 2005. He went on to make 15 appearances in the Conference National the following season, after which he joined Moor Green in the Conference North. After one season with Moor Green, he joined hometown club Redditch United in July 2007.

He re-signed for Kidderminster on a one-year contract on 10 May 2010. On 28 April 2015, it was announced that Lewis would be released to pursue a career outside full-time football.

On 5 May 2015, Lewis signed for National League North side Solihull Moors.

Ahead of the 2017–18 season, Lewis joined Brackley Town. In his first season with the club, Brackley won the FA Trophy, beating Bromley 5–4 on penalties in the final. In 2022, after finishing second in the league, Lewis was named in the National League North 2021–22 Team of the Season.

== Honours ==
Brackley Town

- FA Trophy: 2017–18

Individual

- National League North Team of the Year: 2021–22
