= Gillian Tett =

British journalist (born 1967)

Gillian Tett OBE
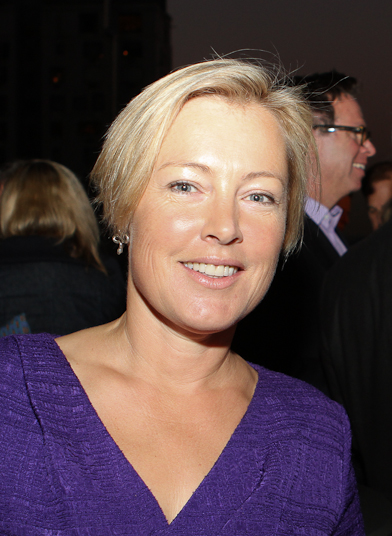
- Gillian Tett in 2014

Provost of King's College, Cambridge
- Incumbent
- Assumed office October 2023
- Preceded by: Michael Proctor

Personal details
- Born: Gillian Romaine Tett; 10 July 1967 (age 59)
- Citizenship: British
- Children: 2
- Education: North London Collegiate School
- Alma mater: University of Cambridge (MA, PhD)
- Occupation: Journalist
- Awards: President's Medal (2011)
- Website: www.kings.cam.ac.uk/people/gillian-tett

Academic background
- Thesis: Ambiguous alliances : marriage and identity in a Muslim village in Soviet Tajikistan (1996)

Gillian Romaine Tett OBE (born 10 July 1967) is a British author and journalist who is provost of King's College, Cambridge and a member of the editorial board for the Financial Times. She writes weekly columns, covering a range of economic, financial, political and social issues. Tett co-founded Moral Money, the paper's sustainability newsletter.

Her work covering the 2008 financial crisis received extensive media attention for its prescient coverage of the financial instruments that led to the 2008 financial crisis.

== Early life and education ==
Tett was born on 10 July 1967 and attended the private North London Collegiate School in the London Borough of Harrow. Aged 17, she worked for a Pakistani nonprofit.

Tett studied at the University of Cambridge at Clare College, graduating in 1989 with a Bachelor of Arts (BA) degree in Archaeology and Anthropology. She was subsequently awarded a Doctor of Philosophy (PhD) degree in social anthropology in 1996 for field research in Tajikistan in the former Soviet Union. She expressed frustration with the discipline of academic anthropology which, in accordance with the prevailing postmodernism, had become so self-critical that she felt it was committing "intellectual suicide". Instead, she pursued a career in journalism.

== Career ==
In 1993, Tett joined the Financial Times as a correspondent from the former Soviet Union and Europe. In 1997, she was posted to Tokyo, where she later became bureau chief. In 2003, she became deputy head of the Lex column. Tett was then U.S. managing editor at the FT, before working as an assistant editor and columnist before returning to the U.S. managing editor position.

From 2005 to 2007, Tett conducted ethnographic research on the American banking institution J.P. Morgan and discovered that the insular culture was leading to the creation of financial instruments that had little basis and that could cause severe economic disruption. In a series of articles in the Financial Times between 2006–07, she wrote about the dangers posed by securitization and financial derivatives, and the unreliability of credit rating agencies. Her 2009 book Fool's Gold: How the Bold Dream of a Small Tribe at J.P. Morgan Was Corrupted by Wall Street Greed and Unleashed a Catastrophe recounts the lead-up to the economic crisis and the eventual collapse. She also played a significant role in the 2010 documentary Inside Job about the 2008 financial crisis. The book won the Spear's Book Award for the financial book of 2009.

Anthro-Vision, a New Way to See in Life and Business, was published in June 2021.

=== King's College, Cambridge ===
In February 2023, she was appointed Provost of King's College, Cambridge. where she has served since October 2023, succeeding Michael Proctor.

=== Awards and honours ===
- 2007, Wincott prize for financial journalism (capital markets coverage)
- 2008, Business Journalist of the Year, British Press Awards
- 2009, Journalist of the Year, British Press Awards
- 2009, Financial Book of the Year (for Fool's Gold)
- 2011, President's Medal of the British Academy.
- 2012, Society of American Business Editors and Writers Award for best feature article, for Madoff spins his story
- 2013, Honorary doctorate, Baruch College of the City University of New York
- 2015, Honorary degree, Lancaster University
- 2016, Honorary degree, University of Exeter.
- 2016, Honorary degree, University of Miami
- 2017, Honorary fellowship, Goldsmiths, University of London.
- 2017, Tepper School of Business Award for Professional Excellence, Carnegie Mellon University
- 2017, Foreign Commentator of the Year, Editorial Intelligence
- 2019, Best in Business Honorees, Newsletter, Moral Money
- 2019, Honorary degree, University of St Andrews
- 2020, Winner, Newsletter Category, Moral Money

=== Books ===
Tett's published books include:

- Saving the Sun: How Wall Street Mavericks Shook Up Japan's Financial World and Made Billions (2004)
- Fool's Gold: How Unrestrained Greed Corrupted a Dream, Shattered Global Markets and Unleashed a Catastrophe (2009)
- The Silo Effect: The Peril of Expertise and the Promise of Breaking Down Barriers (2015)
- Anthro-Vision: A New Way to See in Business and Life (2009)

== Recognition ==
Tett was appointed Officer of the Order of the British Empire (OBE) in the 2024 New Year Honours for services to economic journalism.

== Personal life ==
Tett married Michael J Campbell in 1997. She was a single parent to two daughters, until marrying Henrik Jones in 2024 (having met in 2021).

She is a member of the Overseas Press Club. Tett lives in London.
