= Franz Heymann =

British physicist

Franz Ferdinand Heymann (17 August 1924 – 28 March 2005) was a British physicist who served as Quain Professor from 1975–80 at University College London. He was featured in Who's Who in British Scientists, Who's Who in Atoms and Who's Who in Technology.

== Education and early career ==
He earned his BsC at University of Cape Town in 1944 and his Ph.D at University College London in 1953.

At University College London, he was Assistant Lecturer, Department of Physics (1950-1952); Lecturer (1952-1960); Professor (1966-1972); and Professor, Department of Physics & Astronomy (1975-1987).

== Selected publications ==
- "Parity conservation in n° production by neutrons", Nuovo Cim 1959
- "Quenching of ortho positronium in helium", Proc R Soc 1962
