= Richard Okes =

English academic (1797–1888)

Richard Okes, D.D. (b and Cambridge 15 December 1797; 25 November 1888) was an English academic, the son of Thomas Verney Okes (1755–1828), surgeon to Addenbrooke's Hospital, GP, and apothecary.

Okes was educated at Eton College. He entered King's College, Cambridge in 1818, graduating B.A in 1822 and M.A in 1825. He was appointed a Fellow of Kings in 1826; and ordained a priest in the Church of England in 1827. He was on the staff of Eton from 1821 to 1848. He was Provost of King's College, Cambridge from 1850 until his death; and Vice-Chancellor of the University of Cambridge from 1851 to 1852.
