= Morley Crane =

English botanist 1890-1983

Morley Benjamin Crane
- Born: 17 March 1890; Lambeth, London
- Died: 17 September 1983 (aged 93)
- Spouse: Violet Ruth Watson (m. 1917, d. 1958)
- Scientific career
- Fields: Botany
- Workplaces: John Innes Horticultural Institution (1911-1953)

Morley Benjamin Crane FRS (17 March 1890 - 17 September 1983) was a British botanist known for his work on plant compatibility.

== Early life and education ==
Crane was born 17 March 1890 in Lambeth. As his father had died shortly before the birth, his mother returned with her son to her native East Anglia, marrying Ernest Wiseman, with whom she had three further sons and a daughter. Wiseman was a fruit grower from Kelvedon, who worked at various estates across East Anglia, giving Crane an itinerant start in life.

At the age of four, Crane began school in Ditchingham, where he was taught by Lilian Haggard, the daughter of the novelist H. Rider Haggard. He left school at the age of 12, by which time he was already working various jobs across the fens catching rabbits and foxes and tending to fruit trees.

== Career ==
In 1911, Crane joined the John Innes Horticultural Institution in Merton as an exebitioner, effectively a student horticulturalist. He was given a bursary of £50 a year (a little over £5300 in 2026 money) by the Worshipful Company of Fruiterers, and worked mostly on the institutes fruit trees, while attending evening classes in Wimbledon. Crane's exibitionship ended in 1913, but he remained with the Institution as a sub-foreman, and began experimenting on tomato genetics, leading to a publication in 1915.

However, 1915 also saw Crane leave botany temporarily for war work, first in munitions but soon joining the Royal Flying Corps, enlisting in 1916. By the end of the war, Crane had attained the rank of sergeant.

Crane rejoined the John Innes in 1919 as a technical assistant, remaining there until 1953. He was assigned an assistant in 1924 and promoted to pomologist in 1928. In 1935, Dan Lewis was assigned assistant pomologist and in 1937, a re-organisation of the JI created a Department of Pomology, led by Crane, giving him a whole team to direct.

In 1950, Crane was promoted further to deputy director of the institution while retaining leadership of the pomology department. He kept both roles until his retirement in 1953.

== Awards and recognition ==
Crane was elected an associate of the Linnean Society in 1926 and an honorary fellow in 1973. He received the Jones-Bateman Cup and Medal of the Royal Horticultural Society in 1930, the Veitch Memorial Medal in 1938 and the Victoria Medal of Honour in 1944. He was elected a Fellow of the Royal Society in 1947 and gained the Freedom of the City of London in 1949.

== Personal life ==
Crane married Violet Ruth Watson, from Wisbech, in 1917. They had two daughters, Joan and Anne.

Upon retiring in 1953, Crane moved with Violet to Firs Farm, which he had originally purchased as a place to which his family could be evacuated during The Blitz. Upon Violet's death in 1958, he sold the farm and moved in with Joan in Haughley, later moving to a cottage on the site of Firs Farm named "Plovers Dip" in 1965. It was in this cottage that he died on 17 September 1983.
