= Michael Proctor (academic) =

British physicist and mathematician

Michael Proctor FRS FIMA FRAS
- Born: Michael Richard Edward Proctor; 19 September 1950 (age 76); Bournemouth, Dorset, England
- Education: Shrewsbury School; University of Cambridge
- Scientific career
- Fields: Astrophysics
- Workplaces: University of Cambridge (MMath, PhD)
- Thesis: Non-linear mean field dynamo models and related topics (1975)
- Doctoral advisor: Keith Moffatt

Michael Richard Edward Proctor FRS FIMA FRAS (born 19 September 1950) is a British physicist, mathematician, and academic. He is Professor of Astrophysical Fluid Dynamics at the University of Cambridge and, until 2023, served as the Provost of King's College, Cambridge and school governor at Eton College.

== Early life and education ==
Proctor was born on 19 September 1950 in Bournemouth, Dorset. The son of a farmer, he grew up in Spalding, Lincolnshire. He was educated at Shrewsbury School and won a scholarship to study mathematics at Trinity College, Cambridge, and matriculated at the college in 1968. He achieved a distinction in Part III of the Mathematical Tripos and then graduated in 1972 with a Master of Mathematics (MMath) degree. From 1972 to 1973, he was a Kennedy Scholar at the Massachusetts Institute of Technology (MIT) in the United States. He then returned to the University of Cambridge to undertake postgraduate research supervised by Keith Moffatt. He completed his Doctor of Philosophy (PhD) degree in July 1975 on non-linear mean field dynamo models. In 1995, he was awarded a Doctor of Science (ScD) degree, a higher doctorate, by the University of Cambridge.

== Career and research ==
In 1974, Proctor was elected a Fellow of Trinity College, Cambridge. From 1975 to 1977, he was a postdoctoral researcher and assistant professor at the Massachusetts Institute of Technology. He returned to the University of Cambridge in 1977 as an assistant lecturer in the Department of Applied Mathematics and Theoretical Physics. In the same year he was appointed a college lecturer at Trinity College, Cambridge. He served as a tutor at Trinity from 1979 to 1991, and from 1992 to 1994. At university level, he was promoted to lecturer in 1982.

He was promoted to Reader in 1994. In the same year, he was elected Dean of Trinity College. In 2000, he was appointed Professor of Astrophysical Fluid dynamics. He was elected Vice-Master of Trinity College in 2006. In 2012, he was elected Provost of King's College, Cambridge. He moved from Trinity to King's to take up the position at the start of the 2013 academic year. On 2 May 2017, he was re-elected for a second five-year term as provost from 1 October 2018.

=== Honours and awards ===
In 1977, Proctor was elected Fellow of the Royal Astronomical Society (FRAS). He was awarded a Doctor of Science (ScD) degree by the University of Cambridge in 1995. He was elected a Fellow of the Royal Society (FRS) in 2006, and as a Fellow of the Institute of Mathematics and its Applications (FIMA) in 2007.

Academic offices
Preceded by Ross Harrison	Provost of King's College, Cambridge; 2013 to 2023	Succeeded by Gillian Tett
