= Peter Robert Bell =

British academic botanist

- Born: February 18, 1920
- Died: January 10, 2009 (aged 88)
- Education: Simon Langton School
- Alma mater: University of Cambridge
- Known for: reproductive cells of land plants; history of botany
- Spouse: Elizabeth Harrison
- Children: 2
- Parents: Andrew Bell (father); Mabel Bell (mother)
- Scientific career
- Fields: botany
- Institutions: University College London

Peter Robert Bell (1920 - 2009) was a botanist specialising in ferns, gymnosperms and electron microscopy. He was Quain Professor and Head of the Department of Botany and Microbiology at University College London 1978–85.

== Early life, education and personal life ==
Peter Robert Bell was born on 18 February 1920 in Whitstable in Kent where his parents (Andrew and Mabel Bell) had a market garden, specialising in strawberries. Bell attended the Simon Langton School in Canterbury and then studied Natural Sciences at University of Cambridge, supported by a scholarship available to boys from a market garden background. He was at Christ's College. He graduated with a first class degree and became an MA in 1949.

He married Elizabeth Harrison in 1952 and they had two sons together. Bell died 10 January 2009.

== Career ==
Bell became a leader in the study of reproductive biology of ferns and gymnosperms and a pioneering electron microscopist. He also published about the history of botany. In 1946 he was appointed as an assistant lecturer on the staff of University College London and stayed there throughout his career. He was promoted to Professor of Botany in 1967. He was later appointed the Quain Professor of Botany (1979-1985) and Head of Department. He focused on the alternation of generations in ferns, and attempted to understand the genes involved in this switch. Initially he applied immunocytochemistry and autoradiography as well as microscopy, but adopted new technologies as they became available. He also travelled widely, especially to tropical areas. He was involved in exploration of the Ecuadorian Andes.

== Publications ==
Bell was the author or co-author of over 35 scientific publications and several books. Some of the most significant were:

- Peter R. Bell (1992) Green Plants: Their origin and diversity Thoroughly revised version of Diversity of Green Plants; Second edition Peter R. Bell and Alan R. Hemsley (2000) Green Plants: Their origin and diversity, Cambridge University Press.
- Peter R. Bell and co-authors. Diversity of Green Plants Three editions. 2nd edn (P. R. Bell & Alan R. Hemsley), 3rd edn 1983 (P. R. Bell & C.L.F. Woodcock)
- Co-translator (with D. E. Coombe) of Strasburger’s Textbook of Botany, (8th English edition, 1976)
- Co-editor (with C. F. Woodcock) and contributor to Darwin’s Biological Work - some aspects reconsidered (1959), Cambridge University Press.
- Dickinson, HG and Bell, PR (1973) The Identification of Sporopollenin in Sections of Resin-Embedded Tissues by Controlled Acetolysis. 48 (1) pp. 17 - 22
- Dickinson, HG and Bell, PR (1972) The Role of the Tapetum in the Formation of Sporopollenin-containing Structures during Microsporogenesis in Pinus banksiana. Planta 107 pp. 205 - 215
- PR Sheffield, E and Bell PR (1979) Ultrastructural Aspects of Sporogenesis in a Fern, Pteridium aquilinum (L.) Kuhn. Annals of Botany 44 (4), pp. 393 - 405
- Bell, PR and Duckett JG (1976) Gametogenesis and fertilization in Pteridium. Botanical Journal of the Linnean Society '73 (1 - 3) pp. 74 - 78
- Bell, PR (1958) Twining of the hop Humulus lupulus L. Nature 181 pp. 1009 - 1010

== Personal life ==
Bell was a pacifist, having been raised as a Quaker. In 1960 he appeared in court because he had not paid the income tax that would contribute towards the cost of nuclear weapons.
