= Quain Professor =

Professorship at University College London

Quain Professor is the professorship title for certain disciplines at University College London, England. The title honours Richard Quain, who became Professor of Anatomy in 1832 at what would become University College, London. Quain left a legacy to the university to endow professorships in four subjects in 1887. He intended that the funding should recognise his brother, John Richard Quain, as well as himself.

The Burhop prize for Physics, Applied Physics or Mathematics/Physics is also drawn from these funds.

The Quain professorships cover Botany, English language and literature, Jurisprudence, and Physics.

== Botany ==
- Francis Wall Oliver (1890–1925)
- Edward J. Salisbury (1929–1943)
- William Pearsall (1944–1957)
- Dan Lewis (1958-1978)
- Peter Robert Bell (1979-1985)
- George Russell Stewart (1985-1991)
- Gail Taylor (2024-present)

== English ==
- William Paton Ker (1889–1920)
- Raymond Wilson Chambers (1922–1942)
- Albert Hugh Smith (1949–1963)
- Randolph Quirk (1968–1981)
- Sidney Greenbaum (1983–1990)
- David Trotter (1991–2001)
- Rosemary Ashton (2002–2012)
- Susan Irvine (2013–present)

== Jurisprudence ==
- Augustine Birrell (1896-1899)
- Sir John Macdonell(1901–1920)
- J. E. G. de Montmorency (1920–32)
- Sir Maurice Amos (1932–1937)
- Glanville Williams (1945–1955)
- Dennis Lloyd, Baron Lloyd of Hampstead (1956–1982)
- William Twining (1983–1996)
- Ronald Dworkin (1998–2005; Bentham Professor until 2008)
- Ross Harrison (2006–2007)
- G. A. Cohen (2008–2009)
- John Tasioulas (2011–2014)

== Physics ==
- George Carey Foster (-1898)
- Hugh Longbourne Callendar (1899-1901)
- Frederick Thomas Trouton (1902–1914)
- William Henry Bragg (1915–1923)
- Edward Andrade (1928–1950)
- Harrie Stewart Wilson Massey (1950–1972)
- Franz Ferdinand Heymann (1975–1987)
- John Finney (1993–1999)
- Gabriel Aeppli (2002–present)
