= Josh Rees =

English footballer (born 1993)

Personal information
- Full name: Joshua David Rees
- Date of birth: 4 October 1993 (age 33)
- Place of birth: Hemel Hempstead, England
- Height: 5 ft 9 in (1.75 m)
- Position: Midfielder

Team information
- Current team: Eastbourne Borough
- Number: 4

Youth career
- 2001–2012: Arsenal

Senior career*
Years	Team	Apps	(Gls)
2012–2013	Arsenal	0	(0)
2013	→ Brentford (loan)	0	(0)
2013–2016	Nottingham Forest	1	(0)
2015	→ Nuneaton Town (loan)	8	(1)
2016	→ Torquay United (loan)	18	(1)
2016	Braintree Town	0	(0)
2016–2017	Chelmsford City	37	(6)
2017–2018	Bromley	43	(16)
2018–2019	Gillingham	18	(1)
2019–2020	Bromley	30	(4)
2020–2021	Aldershot Town	39	(12)
2021–2023	Boreham Wood	73	(13)
2023–2025	Dagenham & Redbridge	86	(31)
2025–2026	Hornchurch	43	(11)
2026–	Eastbourne Borough	16	(9)

International career
2008	England U16	2	(0)
2009	England U17	5	(1)
2017	England C	1	(0)
- * Club domestic league appearances and goals as of 23:58, 21 November 2026 (UTC)

Joshua David Rees (born 4 October 1993) is an English professional footballer who plays as a midfielder for Isthmian League Premier Division club Eastbourne Borough.

== Club career ==
=== Arsenal ===
Rees joined Arsenal as a schoolboy and worked his way through the side's academy, until he left the club at the end of the 2012–13 season. He was loaned to the Brentford Development Squad during the latter stages of the 2012–13 season.

=== Nottingham Forest ===
Rees joined Nottingham Forest's youth team in 2013 and made his debut for the club as a 76th-minute substitute in a 2–1 defeat to Brighton & Hove Albion on 3 May 2014. Having made no further appearances for the club, it was announced on 25 May 2016 that Rees would be released by Nottingham Forest at the end of the season. While at the City Ground he was loaned to National League clubs Nuneaton Town and Torquay United.

=== Chelmsford City ===
Rees signed for National League South club Chelmsford City on 19 August 2016. He made 49 appearances and scored seven goals during the 2016–17 season and was a part of the squad which won the Essex Senior Cup.

=== Bromley ===
Rees joined National League club Bromley on 20 June 2017. He made 55 appearances and scored 20 goals during the 2017–18 season and was a part of the team which lost on penalties in the 2018 FA Trophy Final.

=== Gillingham ===
On 12 June 2018 he returned to the EFL by signing for League One club Gillingham. In August 2019 his contract with the club was terminated.

=== Return to Bromley ===
Following his departure from the Gills, he immediately returned to former club Bromley.

=== Aldershot Town ===
On 28 July 2020, Rees joined National League rivals Aldershot Town ahead of the 2020–21 season.

=== Boreham Wood ===
On 1 July 2021, Rees joined fellow National League side Boreham Wood on a two-year deal.

=== Dagenham & Redbridge ===
In 2023, Rees joined Dagenham & Redbridge.

=== Hornchurch ===
In May 2025, Rees joined National League South side Hornchurch.

=== Eastbourne Borough ===
In May 2026, Rees joined Isthmian League side Eastbourne Borough.

== Personal life ==
Rees attended Hadleigh Community Primary School and Southend High School for Boys.

He holds a first class honours degree in Sports Science awarded in 2018 by Manchester Metropolitan University.

== Honours ==
Chelmsford City

- Essex Senior Cup: 2016–17

Bromley

- FA Trophy runner-up: 2017–18

Hornchurch

- National League South play-offs: 2026

England U16

- Victory Shield: 2008

== Career statistics ==
As of 21 November 2026

Appearances and goals by club, season and competition
Club	Season	League			FA Cup		League Cup		Other		Total	
Club	Season	Division	Apps	Goals	Apps	Goals	Apps	Goals	Apps	Goals	Apps	Goals
Nottingham Forest	2013–14	Championship	1	0	0	0	0	0	—		1	0
Nuneaton Town (loan)	2014–15	Conference Premier	8	1	—		—		2 (Note: Appearance(s) in Birmingham Senior Cup.)	1	10	2
Torquay United (loan)	2015–16	National League	18	0	—		—		3 (Note: Appearance(s) in FA Trophy.)	1	21	1
Braintree Town	2016–17	National League	0	0	—		—		—		0	0
Chelmsford City	2016–17	National League South	37	6	1	0	—		11 (Note: 5 appearances in FA Trophy, 3 appearances in National League play-offs, 3 appearances and 1 goal in Essex Senior Cup.)	1	49	7
Bromley	2017–18	National League	43	16	3	1	—		9	3	55	20
Gillingham	2018–19	League One	18	1	2	1	0	0	3 (Note: Appearance(s) in EFL Trophy.)	0	23	2
Bromley	2019–20	National League	30	4	3	0	—		1	0	34	4
Aldershot Town	2020–21	National League	39	12	1	0	—		3	1	43	13
Boreham Wood	2021–22	National League	34	8	6	2	—		2	0	42	10
Boreham Wood	2022–23	National League	39	5	4	0	—		2 (Note: One appearance in FA Trophy, one appearance in National League play-offs)	0	45	5
Boreham Wood	Total		73	13	10	2	—		4	0	87	15
Dagenham & Redbridge	2023–24	National League	45	16	1	0	—		0	0	46	16
Dagenham & Redbridge	2024–25	National League	41	15	3	2	—		2 (Note: One appearance in FA Trophy, one appearance and one goal in National League Cup)	1	46	18
Dagenham & Redbridge	Total		86	31	4	2	—		2	1	92	34
Hornchurch	2025–26	National League South	43	11	0	0	—		6 (Note: Two appearances and one goal in National League South play-offs, three appearances in FA Trophy, one appearance in Essex Senior Cup)	1	49	12
Eastbourne Borough	2026–27	IL Premier Division	16	9	4	0	—		4 (Note: Three appearances in FA Trophy, one appearance in Sussex Senior Cup)	0	24	9
Career total			412	104	28	6	0	0	48	9	488	119
