= James Edward Geoffrey de Montmorency =

Professor of law at University College London

- Born: 6 December 1866
- Died: 9 March 1934 (aged 67)

Academic background
- Education: University of Cambridge (BA 1889, LLB 1890)

Academic work
- Discipline: Jurisprudence
- Institutions: University College London (1920-1930); King's College London (1920); University of Cambridge (1914-1918)

James Edward Geoffrey de Montmorency FRSL (1866 - 1934) was a British jurist who served as the Quain Professor of Comparative Law at University College London from 1920 to 1932.

== Early life and education ==
de Montmorency was born 6 December 1866 to James Lodge de Montmorency and Susan Kiddel, their third son, at Greenwich Hospital, where his father was a member of staff. He received his schooling at the Blackheath Proprietary School, before reading law at Peterhouse College Cambridge, where he was awarded a BA in 1889 and LLB in 1890.

== Career ==
de Montmorency was called to the bar at the Middle Temple in 1892, but was more interested in law academically than practising in court, and became the King Edward VII Legal Research Scholar of the Middle Temple from 1911-1912. He went on to become a lecturer in Private International Law at Cambridge from 1914 to 1918, also briefly lecturing on the laws of war at the School of Economics in 1915 and at the London Day Training College in 1916. He also lectured on the history of the League of Nations at King's College London in 1920.

He fell under the influence of John Macdonell, the then Quain Professor, whom he succeeded in 1920, serving until his retirement in 1930. He was also dean of the UCL Faculty of Laws 1926 to 1930.

== Interest in schools ==
As well as his work in law and lecturing, de Montmorency had a keen interest in schools. He was governor of multiple church schools and wrote multiple books on education, including State intervention in English education (1902), The progress of education in England (1904) and National Education and National Life (1906).

== Personal life ==
de Montmorency married Caroline Maud Saumarez in 1899. They had a son and two daughters. He died on 9 March 1934, at home in Blackheath.

== Awards and recognition ==
de Montmorency received the 1909 Seatonian prize, which is awarded each year to a Cambridge graduate for the best English poem on a sacred subject. He also received the Quain prize comparative law in 1902.
