= Brandon Hanlan =

English footballer (born 1997)

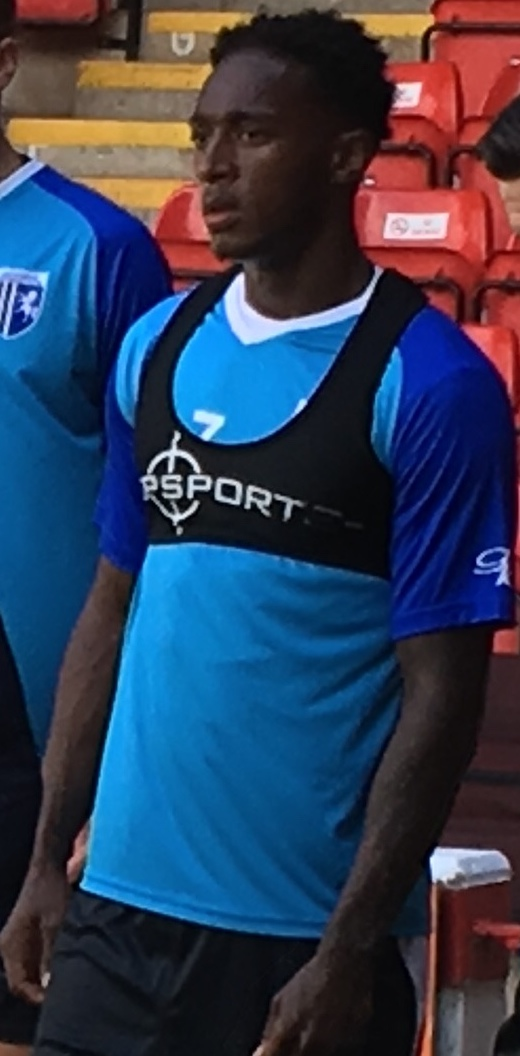
- Hanlan in 2018

Personal information
- Full name: Brandon Alex Graham Hanlan
- Date of birth: 31 May 1997 (age 29)
- Place of birth: Chelsea, England
- Height: 6 ft 0 in (1.82 m)
- Position: Forward

Team information
- Current team: Doncaster Rovers
- Number: 9

Youth career
- 2012–2015: Charlton Athletic

Senior career*
| Years | Team | Apps | (Gls) |
| 2015–2018 | Charlton Athletic | 9 | (0) |
| 2017 | → Bromley (loan) | 8 | (4) |
| 2017–2018 | → Colchester United (loan) | 18 | (2) |
| 2018 | → Bromley (loan) | 15 | (3) |
| 2018–2020 | Gillingham | 74 | (13) |
| 2020–2021 | Bristol Rovers | 45 | (7) |
| 2021–2025 | Wycombe Wanderers | 94 | (11) |
| 2025 | → Stevenage (loan) | 16 | (2) |
| 2025– | Doncaster Rovers | 44 | (6) |
- * Club domestic league appearances and goals as of 12 March 2026 (UTC)

Brandon Alex Graham Hanlan (born 31 May 1997) is an English professional footballer who plays as a forward for EFL League One club Doncaster Rovers.

Hanlan made his first-team debut at Charlton Athletic in August 2016. He went on to have loan spells with Bromley and Colchester United, featuring for Bromley in the 2018 FA Trophy final defeat at Wembley Stadium. Released by Charlton, he signed with Gillingham in June 2018. He was named as the club's Young Player of the Season for 2018–19. He joined Bristol Rovers in September 2020 for a fee later set by a tribunal at £150,000. He was sold on to Wycombe Wanderers for an undisclosed fee in August 2021. He spent four seasons with the club, scoring 16 goals in 111 appearances. He spent the second half of the 2024–25 season on loan at Stevenage. He left Wycombe to join Doncaster Rovers in June 2025.

== Career ==
=== Charlton Athletic ===
Hanlan joined the academy at Charlton Athletic in November 2012, and signed a two-year contract extension in April 2016. He impressed manager Russell Slade during pre-season friendly games. He made his first-team debut as an 84th-minute substitute for Kevin Foley in a 2–0 defeat to Bury at Gigg Lane in a League One match on 6 August 2016. He went on to feature a total of 15 times for the Addicks in the 2016–17 campaign, whilst also playing for Jason Euell's U23 side. On 20 January 2017, he joined National League club Bromley on a one-month loan. He scored four goals in eight games for Neil Smith's Ravens.

On 31 August 2017, Hanlan joined Colchester United on loan until 14 January. Charlton manager Karl Robinson said it was important for the player's development to find gametime at the Colchester Community Stadium rather playing "10 minutes here, 15 minutes there" at The Valley. Hanlan made his League Two debut as a substitute on 12 September and scored in the 1–1 draw with Chesterfield. He scored twice in his first three appearances for the U's, though did not find the net in his remaining 17 before he fell out of favour after manager John McGreal switched to 3–4–3 and 4–3–3 formations. On 1 February, Hanlan rejoined Bromley on loan until the end of the 2017–18 season. He played at Wembley Stadium in the 2018 FA Trophy final after entering the game as a 68th-minute substitute for Louis Dennis; the match ended in a 1–1 draw and Hanlan scored in the penalty shoot-out, which was won 5–4 by Brackley Town. Upon his return from Hayes Lane, he was released by Charlton at the end of the 2017–18 season.

=== Gillingham ===
On 2 June 2018, Hanlan signed for League One club Gillingham on a two-year deal. He scored the Gills' first goal of the season on his full Gillingham debut in a 2–0 away win against Accrington Stanley on 4 August. He was named as the club's Young Player of the Season for the 2018–19 campaign after having scored nine goals in 44 games. Manager Steve Lovell said in March that "the only thing missing from his game was goals".

He scored seven goals in 40 games during the 2019–20 season, which was ended early due to the COVID-19 pandemic in England. Manager Steve Evans said in September 2020 that the club had turned down an "insulting" transfer bid for Hanlan from a rival League One club. Evans had previously rejected an offer from another club, Portsmouth, who he said had subsequently "lost interest" in the player. Hanlan had scored 16 goals in 84 games in his two seasons at Priestfield Stadium.

=== Bristol Rovers ===
On 10 September 2020, Hanlan joined League One club Bristol Rovers on a two-year deal for a fee set by a tribunal at £150,000. Manager Ben Garner said he would provide the "work ethic and energy we want at the front end of the team" and replace Jonson Clarke-Harris as the club's number nine, playing alongside James Daly. Hanlan made his debut two days later in a 1–1 opening day draw away at Sunderland, before being replaced due to injury in the second half. He scored his first goal for the club on 3 October, opening the scoring in a 2–0 win over Northampton Town when he converted a penalty after he was fouled by Cian Bolger in the penalty area. On 20 October, Hanlan scored his third goal for the Gas, his first from open play, heading in a Zain Westbrooke free kick to score the only goal of the game in a victory over Shrewsbury Town. He played 48 appearances in the 2020–21 season, scoring nine goals, as Rovers were relegated down in last place.

In August 2021, Hanlan was subject to a bid from League One side Lincoln City, which was rejected by Bristol Rovers as the fee offered was less than the sum the club had recently paid following the tribunal's outcome. Manager Joey Barton spoke of his desire to keep the striker at the Memorial Stadium; however, he admitted that the Hanlan had had his head turned by the offer and now wanted to leave. Barton later said that Hanlan "couldn't hit a cow's arse with a banjo", but had "left with no hard feelings" after featuring in one League Two game for the Pirates.

=== Wycombe Wanderers ===
On 26 August 2021, Hanlan returned to League One to join Wycombe Wanderers for an undisclosed fee reported to be £150,000 plus add-ons and a sell-on clause, signing a three-year deal. On 21 September, Hanlan scored his first goal for the club, Wycombe's only goal in a 6–1 defeat to Manchester City in the EFL Cup. After scoring another in an EFL Trophy defeat to Milton Keynes Dons, his first league goal for the Chairboys came in a 2–0 win over his former club Gillingham. He played in the 2022 League One play-off final defeat to Sunderland, having entered the game as a 65th-minute substitute for Jordan Obita. In total, he scored eight goals in 43 appearances for Gareth Ainsworth's Chairboys throughout the 2021–22 season. He scored three goals in 36 games during the 2022–23 campaign.

He was reported to have agreed personal terms with Wrexham in August 2023, though no move materialised. On 11 November, Hanlan suffered a serious Anterior cruciate ligament injury after being pulled to the ground by Stevenage captain Carl Piergianni, requiring him to be taken off the pitch on a stretcher while wearing an oxygen mask. His contract with Wycombe was extended the following month as manager Matt Bloomfield saw him as "a key part of our plans going forward". He returned to light training after nine months.

On 10 October 2024, after almost 11 months out injured, he made his return to football, playing the final 20 minutes of a behind-closed-doors friendly with Queens Park Rangers. He played 13 competitive games upon returning to Wycombe, scoring two goals in cup games. On 31 January, Hanlan joined League One rivals Stevenage on loan for the remainder of the 2024–25 season. Manager Alex Revell said that he brought the player to Broadhall Way to easy the burden on Boro's existing centre-forwards. Hanlan scored two goals in 12 starts and four substitute appearances. On 20 May 2025, Wycombe announced he would leave when his contract expired at the end of June. He had scored 16 goals from 111 games in a four-year stay at Adams Park.

=== Doncaster Rovers ===
On 13 June 2025, Hanlan signed a two-year deal with newly-promoted League One club Doncaster Rovers, to start on 1 July. Manager Grant McCann said "he's someone who has annoyed me whenever I've come up against him. Brandon brings his energy, his pressing, his aggression".

== Style of play ==
Hanlan has been described as a nimble and powerful forward, able to hold the ball up well and score goals.

== Career statistics ==
As of match played 24 April 2025

| Club | Season | Division | League | | FA Cup | | EFL Cup | | Other | | Total | |
| Club | Season | Division | Apps | Goals | Apps | Goals | Apps | Goals | Apps | Goals | Apps | Goals |
|---|---|---|---|---|---|---|---|---|---|---|---|---|
| Charlton Athletic | 2016–17 | League One | 9 | 0 | 2 | 0 | 1 | 0 | 3 (Note: Appearance/s in the EFL Trophy.) | 0 | 15 | 0 |
| Charlton Athletic | 2017–18 | League One | 0 | 0 | 0 | 0 | 0 | 0 | 0 | 0 | 0 | 0 |
| Charlton Athletic | Total | | 9 | 0 | 2 | 0 | 1 | 0 | 3 | 0 | 15 | 0 |
| Bromley (loan) | 2016–17 | National League | 8 | 4 | — | | — | | 0 | 0 | 8 | 4 |
| Colchester United (loan) | 2017–18 | League Two | 18 | 2 | 1 | 0 | — | | 1 | 0 | 20 | 2 |
| Bromley (loan) | 2017–18 | National League | 15 | 3 | — | | — | | 7 (Note: Appearance/s in the FA Trophy.) | 2 | 22 | 5 |
| Gillingham | 2018–19 | League One | 39 | 9 | 3 | 0 | 1 | 0 | 1 | 0 | 44 | 9 |
| Gillingham | 2019–20 | League One | 35 | 4 | 4 | 2 | 1 | 1 | 0 | 0 | 40 | 7 |
| Gillingham | Total | | 74 | 13 | 7 | 2 | 2 | 1 | 1 | 0 | 84 | 16 |
| Bristol Rovers | 2020–21 | League One | 44 | 7 | 2 | 1 | — | | 2 | 1 | 48 | 9 |
| Bristol Rovers | 2021–22 | League Two | 1 | 0 | 0 | 0 | 0 | 0 | 0 | 0 | 1 | 0 |
| Bristol Rovers | Total | | 45 | 7 | 2 | 1 | 0 | 0 | 2 | 1 | 49 | 9 |
| Wycombe Wanderers | 2021–22 | League One | 36 | 6 | 2 | 0 | 1 | 1 | 4 (Note: Three appearances in the EFL Trophy, one appearance in the League One play-offs) | 1 | 43 | 8 |
| Wycombe Wanderers | 2022–23 | League One | 34 | 3 | 1 | 0 | 0 | 0 | 1 | 0 | 36 | 3 |
| Wycombe Wanderers | 2023–24 | League One | 16 | 2 | 1 | 0 | 1 | 1 | 1 | 0 | 19 | 3 |
| Wycombe Wanderers | 2024–25 | League One | 8 | 0 | 3 | 1 | 0 | 0 | 2 | 1 | 13 | 2 |
| Wycombe Wanderers | Total | | 94 | 11 | 7 | 1 | 2 | 2 | 8 | 2 | 111 | 16 |
| Stevenage (loan) | 2024–25 | League One | 16 | 2 | — | | — | | 0 | 0 | 16 | 2 |
| Doncaster Rovers | 2025–26 | League One | 36 | 6 | 0 | 0 | 0 | 0 | 0 | 0 | 0 | 0 |
| Doncaster Rovers | 2026–27 | League One | 8 | 0 | 0 | 0 | 2 | 0 | 2 | 0 | 12 | 0 |
| Career total | | | 278 | 42 | 19 | 4 | 5 | 3 | 22 | 5 | 324 | 54 |

== Honours ==
Bromley

- FA Trophy runner-up: 2017–18

Individual

- Gillingham Young Player of the Season: 2018–19
