= Theo Streete =

English footballer

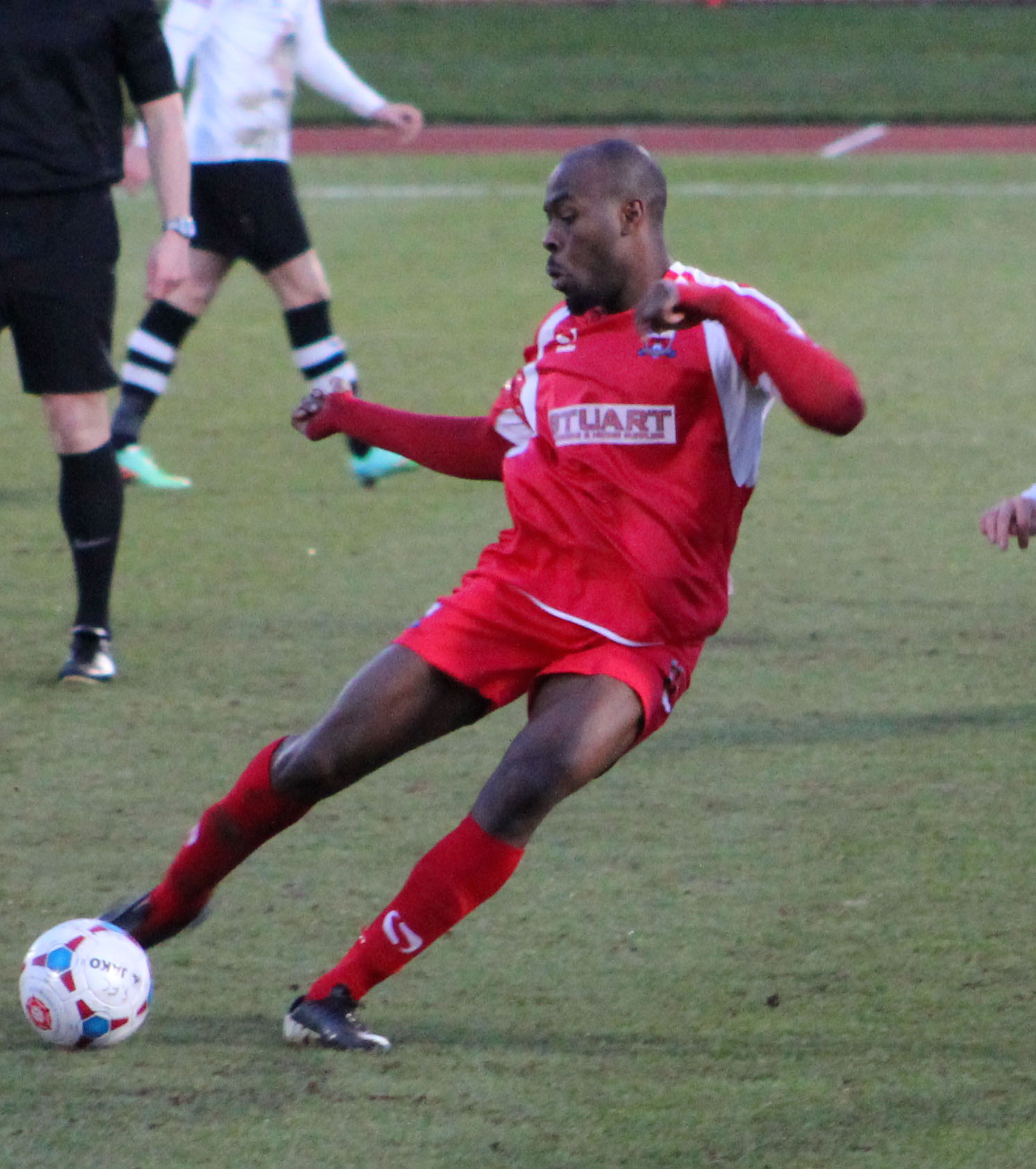
- Streete with Nuneaton Town

Personal information
- Date of birth: 23 November 1987 (age 38)
- Place of birth: Birmingham, England
- Position: Defender

Team information
- Current team: Leamington

Youth career
- –2006: Derby County

Senior career*
Years	Team	Apps	(Gls)
2006	Derby County	0	(0)
2006	→ Doncaster Rovers (loan)	6	(1)
2007	Rotherham United	4	(0)
2007–2011	Solihull Moors	141	(4)
2011–2013	Alfreton Town	102	(2)
2013–2015	Nuneaton Town	80	(4)
2015–2016	Solihull Moors	38	(0)
2018	Brackley Town	5	(0)
2018–2022	AFC Telford United	106	(3)
2022–	Leamington	100	(1)
- * Club domestic league appearances and goals as of 11:11, 15 September 2022 (UTC)

Theo Streete (born 23 November 1987) is an English footballer who plays as a defender for Leamington.

== Career ==
Born in Birmingham, Streete began his career with Derby County, turning professional in August 2006, but only on a short-term deal. He joined Doncaster Rovers on loan in September 2006, making his league debut for Rovers on 30 September in the 2–0 defeat away to Scunthorpe United. His last game for Doncaster was a 1–0 win against Nottingham Forest in December 2006, Doncaster's last competitive game at their Belle Vue ground in which Streete scored a bizarre second-half goal. He was released by Derby after returning from his spell on loan.

In mid-January 2007, Streete had a trial with Bristol Rovers, and later that month had a further trial with Grimsby Town.

The following month he joined Rotherham United until the end of the season. In the 2007 close season he joined the newly formed Conference North side Solihull Moors, and was voted Player Of The Year 2010 by the fans. On 3 February 2011, Solihull confirmed Alfreton Town had finalised a deal to purchase Streete. On 7 June 2013, Streete joined fellow Conference National side Nuneaton Town.

On 18 May 2015, Streete rejoined National League North side Solihull Moors and resumed his role as club captain. He had twelve months out of the game recovering from a knee injury before in January 2018 joining Brackley Town and was part of the team that won the FA Trophy at Wembley in May following their penalty shoot out win over Bromley.

In May 2018 he joined AFC Telford United. Streete was released in June 2022. On his release, Streete signed for fellow National League North side Leamington to join up with his old captain at Telford Adam Walker. He scored his first goal for Leamington in a 1–0 win over Bradford (Park Avenue) in the National League North.

== Honours ==
Brackley Town

- FA Trophy: 2017–18
