= Judith Mayhew Jonas =

New Zealand-born British lawyer and academic

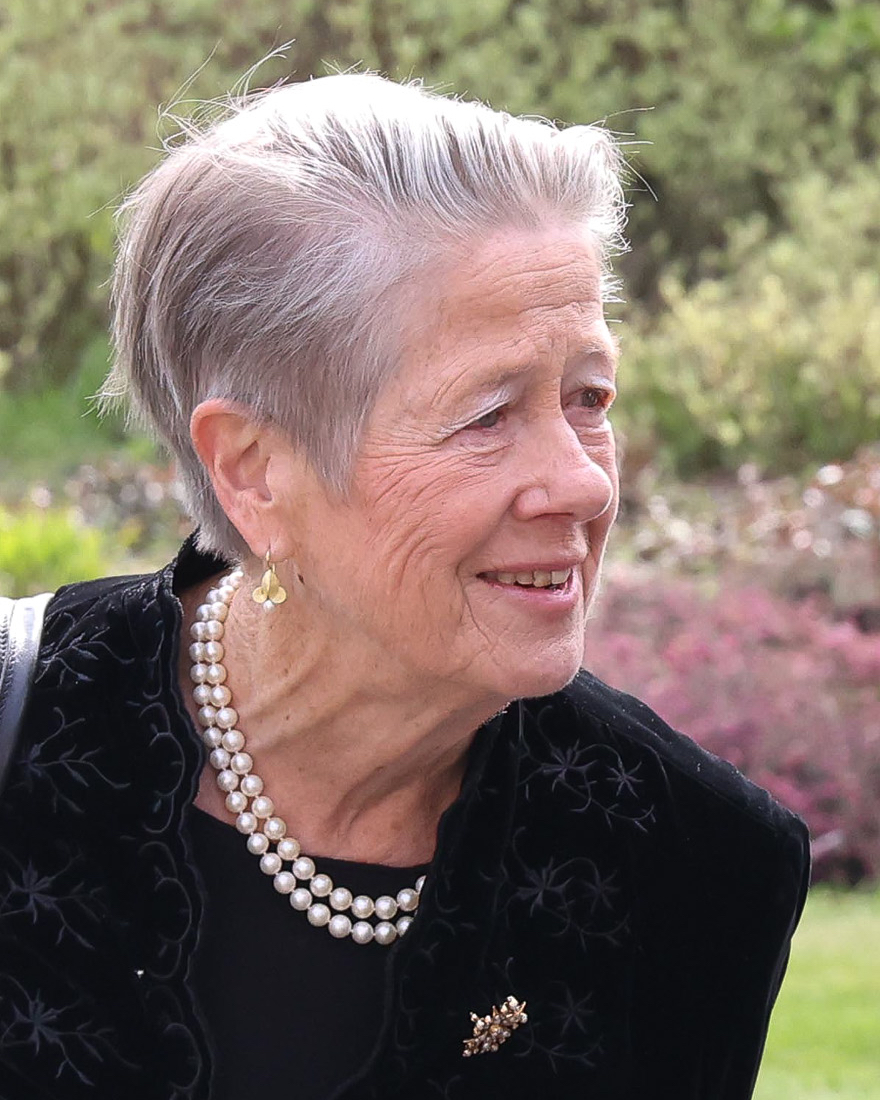
Mayhew Jonas in 2023

Dame Judith Mayhew Jonas, DBE (born 18 October 1948) is a New Zealand-born British solicitor, local government politician and academic. She has been the first woman to hold a number of public roles in the United Kingdom such as a two-year term as Provost of King's College, Cambridge and chair of the Royal Opera House.

== Early life ==
Born and educated in New Zealand, Judith Mayhew was the daughter of Bill and Joyce Mayhew. She attended Corstorphine Primary School in Dunedin and Otago Girls' High School graduating LLM from the University of Otago.

== Career ==
She lectured at Otago before moving to the UK as a lecturer in law at the University of Southampton and then King's College London, from 1976 to 1989, where she set up and became director of the Anglo-French Law Degree (Sorbonne), the first joint degree in Europe.

In 1986, she entered private practice as an employment lawyer, rising to become special adviser to the chairman at Clifford Chance, a global law firm. In 2006, she was appointed to the board of directors of Merrill Lynch.

She was closely involved in the running of the City of London from 1986. In that year she was elected to the City of London Corporation and chaired the corporation's Policy and Resources Committee from 1996 to 2003. From 2001 she was City and Business Advisor to Ken Livingstone, the Mayor of London.

Mayhew Jonas served on a number of boards of educational and cultural institutions. In 1999 she was appointed chair of governors at Birkbeck, University of London. She was Provost of King's College, Cambridge from 2003–05, the first woman to hold this post. She was the first woman to chair the Royal Opera House.

She is a trustee of the Imperial War Museum and of the Urban Land Institute, and co-chair of the British Dutch Dialogues, the Apeldoorn Conference.

From 2008 to 2022 she was Provost (Chancellor) of Bishop Grosseteste University in Lincoln, England.

Mayhew Jonas features in a film series, Dreamcatchers, about successful expatriate New Zealanders.

== Honours and awards ==
Mayhew Jonas was awarded an honorary doctorate by the University of Otago in 1998. She was made a Dame Commander of the Order of the British Empire (DBE) in the 2002 Birthday Honours "for services to the City of London".

In 2004, she was made New Zealander of the Year in Britain. She was Global Award Winner at the New Zealand Women of Influence Awards in 2015.

== Personal ==
She married Christopher Jonas, an English property consultant, in 2003.

Academic offices
Preceded by Patrick Bateson	Provost of King's College, Cambridge; 2003–2005	Succeeded by Ross Harrison
New title	Chancellor of Bishop Grosseteste University; 2008–present	Incumbent
