= Dan Lewis (botanist) =

Quain Professor of Biology at UCL 1957 to 1978

- Born: 30 December 1910; Basford, Staffordshire
- Died: 30 September 2009 (aged 98); University College Hospital, London
- Education: University of London (PhD, DSc); University of Reading (BSc)
- Scientific career
- Fields: Botany
- Workplaces: Queen Mary College; University College London (1957-1978); John Innes Horticultural Institution (1935-1957)

Dan Lewis FRS (30 December 1910 - 30 September 2009) was a British botanist who served as Quain Professor of Botany at University College London from 1957 to 1978. His work focused on plant reproduction, particularly the genetics involved in preventing plants from fertilising themselves, preventing inbreeding.

== Early life and education ==
Lewis was born 30 December 1910 in Basford, near Stoke-on-Trent, to Ernest Albert Lewis and Edith J. Lewis. He was one of four children, with an elder sister Dora and a younger brother Clifford. Clifford's twin brother died in early childhood.

He attended Newcastle-under-Lyme High School from 1919 to 1929, coming top of his cohort in science and French. He also broke the school record for fastest time running a mile in 1928. During this time, Lewis had a keen interest in physics, particularly electricity, often to the exclusion of other schoolwork, leaving him often in the bottom half of the class. He was encouraged by his physics teacher, G.H. Clough, to read physics at Cambridge, but after spending six weeks living with an enthusiastic horticulturalist while his family were quarantined with scarlet fever, he decided instead to pursue botany.

Lewis left school at 18 and began work in a series of nurseries to gain hands-on experience of horticulture. Eventually realising that he would benefit from a university degree, he took a correspondence course with Wolsey Hall to acquire sufficient background, before enrolling in the University of Reading in 1932. Here he studied physics, chemistry and botany, graduating with a second-class BSc. His teachers at Reading included Professors J. Matthews and T.M. Harris, but it was C. Terence Ingold who inspired him to specialise into genetics. After graduating, he spent a year at Reading as a research scholar.

He later took a PhD and DSc from the University of London.

== Career ==
After leaving Reading, Lewis worked at the John Innes Horticultural Institution, first as a scientific officer from 1935 to 1948, and then as Head of Genetics from 1948 to 1957. During this time, he was a Rockefeller Foundation Special Fellow, or possibly a Rothschild Fellow, at the California Institute of Technology from 1955 to 1956. At the John Innes he worked as assistant to Morley Crane, head of fruit breeding, who assigned him to work on the inheritance of raspberries, especially genes causing male sterility. In 1939, Lewis presented this work to the University of London, earning a PhD.

Lewis continued to research male sterility in plants, producing landmark papers in 1941 and 1942. He first studied wild raspberries, finding that the nuclear mutations he had studied in cultivated plants could not be the cause of male sterility in wild populations, and that it was instead the result of a cytoplasmic factor. He also investigated apples and pears, especially the effect of low temperatures on pollen tube growth. He then turned his attention to cross-fertilisation of primroses, and found that the mechanism involved osmosis of the pollen into the stigma.

During the second world war, Lewis was exempted from national service as his work was considered to be of national importance. He moved to Ockley to live in a cottage with his wife and daughter and joined the Home Guard.

After the war, Lewis began working with cherries, and found methods to cross non-compatible cultivars, working toward a cherry that could self-pollinate. However, this work did not come to fruition as the JI site at Merton was shut down in September 1949 and staff moved to Bayfordbury. His work was later continued in Canada, producing a self-compatible variety of cherry known as Stella.

In 1951 Lewis was awarded a Dsc by the University of London and in 1955 he was elected a Fellow of the Royal Society.

Lewis served as Quain Professor of Botany at University College London from 1957 to 1978. He returned to California as a visiting professor in genetics at UC Berkeley (1961-62) and also held visiting professorships at the universities of Delhi (1965-66) and Singapore (1970). He also serves as president of the Genetical Society (now known as the Genetics Society) from 1968 to 1971. At UCL, he was instrumental in moving the botany department in 1963 from rooms above the Slade School of Art to the Darwin Building on Gower Street. He also pushed through a more modular degree structure for the BSc, inspired by his time in America.

In 1969 he was offered a post as director of Kew Gardens, but turned it down as he did not want to lose his post as Chair of Biology on the University Grants Committee.

After leaving UCL, Lewis became a visiting professor at Queen Mary College.

== Personal life ==
Lewis married Mary Phœbe Eleanor Burry on 27 December 1933. They met at Reading, where she was an MSc student in zoology, and had a daughter, Hazel, who read physiology at UCL and became a biomedical researcher. They had three grandchildren and multiple great-grandchildren, the eldest of whom was named Dan. Hazel married the geneticist David Jones, who later became Professor of Genetics at Hull in 1973. Phoebe died of bowel cancer on 31 December 2003.

A keen swimmer, Lewis was known to spend the mornings of his retirement at the swimming baths near his flat in Islington, and aged 80 he swam 5000 m for charity. He was also a keen musician and played the clarinet, while his wife had been a cellist in the University of Reading orchestra.

Lewis died in University College Hospital in September 2009.
