= Ross Harrison (academic) =

British philosopher

Ross Harrison (born 1943) is a British philosopher and academic. He served as Provost of King's College, Cambridge from 2006 to 2013. He was previously Quain Professor of Jurisprudence at University College London. Harrison's books include "Bentham" (RKP, 1983), which explores the philosophy of Jeremy Bentham.

Academic offices
Preceded by Judith Mayhew	Provost of King's College, Cambridge; 2006 to 2013	Succeeded by Michael Proctor
