= 2017–18 FA Trophy =

Football Association Trophy

Tournament details
- Country: England; Guernsey; Wales

Final positions
- Champions: Brackley Town
- Runners-up: Bromley

Tournament statistics
- Top goal scorer: Louis Dennis (7 goals)

The 2017–18 FA Trophy is the 49th season of the FA Trophy, an annual football competition for teams at levels 5-8 of the English National League System.

== Calendar ==
The calendar for the 2017–18 FA Trophy, as announced by The Football Association.

Round	Main Date	Number of Fixtures	Clubs	New Entries This Round	Prize Money
Preliminary round	7 October 2017	64	276 → 212	128	£3,000
First round qualifying	28 October 2017	72	212 → 140	80	£3,250
Second round qualifying	11 November 2017	36	140 → 104	none	£4,000
Third round qualifying	25 November 2017	40	104 → 64	44	£5,000
First round proper	16 December 2017	32	64 → 32	24	£6,000
Second round proper	13 January 2018	16	32 → 16	none	£7,000
Third round proper	3 February 2018	8	16 → 8	none	£8,000
Fourth round proper	24 February 2018	4	8 → 4	none	£10,000
Semi-finals	17 and 24 March 2018	2	4 → 2	none	£20,000
Final	20 May 2018	1	2 → 1	none	Runners-up £30,000; Winners £60,000

== Preliminary round ==
Tie	Home team (tier)	Score	Away team (tier)	Att.
Saturday 7 October 2017
1	Ossett Albion (8)	1–1	Droylsden (8)	139
2	Ramsbottom United (8)	3–0	Colwyn Bay (8)	282
3	Bamber Bridge (8)	4–2	Brighouse Town (8)	304
4	Cleethorpes Town (8)	2–1	Hyde United (8)	297
5	Mossley (8)	3–1	Skelmersdale United (8)	138
6	Kendal Town (8)	2–1	Radcliffe Borough (8)	111
7	Stocksbridge Park Steels (8)	1–4	Atherton Collieries (8)	158
8	Scarborough Athletic (8)	2–5	South Shields (8)	1,338
9	Tadcaster Albion (8)	0–2	Glossop North End (8)	227
10	Ossett Town (8)	3–0	Goole (8)	154
11	Prescot Cables (8)	3–1	Trafford (8)	373
12	Clitheroe (8)	3–0	Colne (8)	398
13	Sheffield (8)	0–3	Frickley Athletic (8)	402
15	Newcastle Town (8)	3–0	Soham Town Rangers (8)	108
16	Chasetown (8)	2–0	Market Drayton Town (8)	289
17	AFC Rushden & Diamonds (8)	1–3	Kidsgrove Athletic (8)	430
18	Basford United (8)	3–0	Peterborough Sports (8)	139
19	Stamford (8)	3–0	Loughborough Dynamo (8)	205
20	Belper Town (8)	1–2	Alvechurch (8)	205
21	Gresley (8)	0–1	Bedworth United (8)	230
22	Leek Town (8)	4–1	Lincoln United (8)	269
24	Greenwich Borough (8)	0–1	Hanwell Town (8)	80
25	Heybridge Swifts (8)	2–0	Carshalton Athletic (8)	181
26	Hertford Town (8)	W.O.	Guernsey (8)	-
Walkover for Hertford Town as Guernsey withdrew from the tournament.
27	Kempston Rovers (8)	0–1	Hythe Town (8)	132
28	Potters Bar Town (8)	4–0	Tilbury (8)	89
29	Ashford United (8)	0–3	Sittingbourne (8)	325
30	Egham Town (8)	7–1	Shoreham (8)	68
31	Northwood (8)	2–5	Maldon & Tiptree (8)	97
32	AFC Sudbury (8)	2–2	Aylesbury United (8)	279
33	Waltham Abbey (8)	2–1	Faversham Town (8)	75
35	VCD Athletic (8)	0–1	Bedford Town (8)	65
36	Haringey Borough (8)	3–0	Whyteleafe (8)	175
37	Bowers & Pitsea (8)	2–2	Dereham Town (8)	173
38	Cray Wanderers (8)	8–0	Horsham (8)	124
39	Chipstead (8)	1–1	Barking (8)	69
40	East Grinstead Town (8)	2–4	Lewes (8)	203
41	Corinthian-Casuals (8)	2–0	AFC Dunstable (8)	153
42	Cheshunt (8)	3–0	Herne Bay (8)	144

Tie	Home team (tier)	Score	Away team (tier)	Att.
43	Ramsgate (8)	3–5	Bury Town (8)	209
44	Hayes & Yeading United (8)	3–1	Barton Rovers (8)	116
45	Brentwood Town (8)	3–3	South Park (8)	113
46	Walton Casuals (8)	3–0	Canvey Island (8)	196
47	Phoenix Sports (8)	0–3	Chalfont St Peter (8)	93
48	Ashford Town (8)	4–1	Uxbridge (8)	111
49	Grays Athletic (8)	4–3	Norwich United (8)	201
50	Aylesbury (8)	4–3	Molesey (8)	77
51	Marlow (8)	0–0	Aveley (8)	101
52	Taunton Town (8)	1–1	AFC Totton (8)	335
53	Mangotsfield United (8)	0–1	Thame United (8)	110
54	Bishop's Cleeve (8)	0–1	Larkhall Athletic (8)	43
55	Shortwood United (8)	1–0	Didcot Town (8)	71
56	Fleet Town (8)	1–1	Yate Town (8)	89
58	North Leigh (8)	1–3	Wimborne Town (8)	85
59	Moneyfields (8)	4–2	Bideford (8)	185
60	Swindon Supermarine (8)	1–0	Barnstaple Town (8)	117
61	Salisbury (8)	2–3	Paulton Rovers (8)	541
62	Slimbridge (8)	0–1	Hartley Wintney (8)	106
63	Bristol Manor Farm (8)	4–1	Cinderford Town (8)	160
64	Kidlington (8)	3–1	Winchester City (8)	78
Sunday 8 October 2017
14	Romulus (8)	0–2	Corby Town (8)	139
23	Thamesmead Town (8)	1–1	AFC Hornchurch (8)	116
34	Romford (8)	0–1	Hastings United (8)	130
57	Evesham United (8)	2–3	Cirencester Town (8)	236
Replays
Monday 9 October 2017
51R	Aveley (8)	5–3 (a.e.t.)	Marlow (8)	115
Tuesday 10 October 2017
1R	Droylsden (8)	1–1 (4–2 p)	Ossett Albion (8)	120
23R	AFC Hornchurch (8)	1–2	Thamesmead Town (8)	126
37R	Dereham Town (8)	1–4	Bowers & Pitsea (8)	180
39R	Barking (8)	2–1	Chipstead (8)	67
45R	South Park (8)	2–7	Brentwood Town (8)	140
52R	AFC Totton (8)	1–2 (a.e.t.)	Taunton Town (8)	228
56R	Yate Town (8)	2–1	Fleet Town (8)	112
Wednesday 11 October 2017
32R	Aylesbury United (8)	1–2	AFC Sudbury (8)	100

== First round qualifying ==
A total of 144 teams took part in this stage of the competition including 64 winners from the preliminary round, 72 teams from Level 7 of English football and eight teams from level 8, who get a bye in the previous round.

Tie	Home team (tier)	Score	Away team (tier)	Att.
Friday 27 October 2017
59	Kingstonian (7)	3–3	Thurrock (7)	225
Saturday 28 October 2017
1	Ashton United (7)	4–1	Frickley Athletic (8)	121
2	Glossop North End (8)	3–2	Matlock Town (7)	310
3	Mossley (8)	0–1	Lancaster City (7)	174
4	Ossett Town (8)	1–3	Droylsden (8)	139
5	Altrincham (7)	3–0	Clitheroe (8)	517
6	Farsley Celtic (7)	1–1	South Shields (8)	382
7	Buxton (7)	1–2	Cleethorpes Town (8)	261
8	Warrington Town (7)	2–1	Bamber Bridge (8)	239
9	Shaw Lane (7)	2–2	Ramsbottom United (8)	183
10	Whitby Town (7)	1–3	Marine (7)	279
11	Prescot Cables (8)	0–0	Stalybridge Celtic (7)	285
12	Kendal Town (8)	2–4	Atherton Collieries (8)	166
13	Workington (7)	4–0	Witton Albion (7)	401
14	Grantham Town (7)	1–0	Halesowen Town (7)	226
15	Rushall Olympic (7)	2–0	Nantwich Town (7)	136
16	Hednesford Town (7)	1–0	Mickleover Sports (7)	308
17	Newcastle Town (8)	2–2	Kidsgrove Athletic (8)	137
18	Stratford Town (7)	2–1	Bedworth United (8)	178
19	Chasetown (8)	2–1	Spalding United (8)	144
20	Stafford Rangers (7)	6–0	St Ives Town (7)	495
21	Barwell (7)	1–0	Carlton Town (8)	138
22	Stamford (8)	3–0	Sutton Coldfield Town (7)	229
23	St Neots Town (7)	3–2	Corby Town (8)	275
24	Redditch United (7)	0–1	Coalville Town (7)	208
25	Cambridge City (8)	0–2	Alvechurch (8)	171
26	Leek Town (8)	3–2	Kettering Town (7)	390
27	Stourbridge (7)	1–0	Basford United (8)	404
28	Hitchin Town (7)	5–0	Cheshunt (8)	265
29	Dorking Wanderers (7)	5–0	Ware (8)	175
30	Maldon & Tiptree (8)	3–0	Walton Casuals (8)	105
31	Billericay Town (7)	3–1	Tooting & Mitcham United (7)	864
32	Leatherhead (7)	1–0	Hythe Town (8)	201
33	Sittingbourne (8)	1–1	Merstham (7)	165
34	Bishop's Stortford (7)	4–0	Hanwell Town (8)	205
35	Needham Market (7)	3–1	Arlesey Town (8)	173
36	King's Lynn Town (7)	0–1	Mildenhall Town (8)	534
37	Hendon (7)	3–1	Kings Langley (7)	171
38	Aylesbury (8)	0–0	Harlow Town (7)	91
39	Barking (8)	0–2	Beaconsfield Town (8)	71
40	Brentwood Town (8)	0–0	Bedford Town (8)	156
41	Tonbridge Angels (7)	3–3	Heybridge Swifts (8)	405
42	Bury Town (8)	1–1	Chalfont St Peter (8)	273
43	Hastings United (8)	3–4	Ashford Town (8)	299
44	Metropolitan Police (7)	3–0	AFC Sudbury (8)	90
45	Dunstable Town (7)	1–4	Lewes (8)	102
46	Corinthian-Casuals (8)	3–1	Hertford Town (8)	150
47	Cray Wanderers (8)	2–2	Grays Athletic (8)	133

Tie	Home team (tier)	Score	Away team (tier)	Att.
48	Worthing (7)	3–0	Lowestoft Town (7)	512
49	Staines Town (7)	0–3	Margate (7)	247
50	Waltham Abbey (8)	0–3	Dulwich Hamlet (7)	203
52	Royston Town (7)	2–0	Enfield Town (7)	303
53	Potters Bar Town (8)	3–0	Witham Town (8)	83
54	Harrow Borough (7)	1–1	Haringey Borough (8)	103
55	Leiston (7)	1–1	Folkestone Invicta (7)	191
56	Burgess Hill Town (7)	2–0	Aveley (8)	197
57	Bowers & Pitsea (8)	1–1	Egham Town (8)	102
58	Biggleswade Town (7)	0–5	Wingate & Finchley (7)	144
60	Hayes & Yeading United (8)	0–3	Chesham United (7)	182
61	Taunton Town (8)	2–1	Merthyr Town (7)	456
62	Dorchester Town (7)	2–1	Basingstoke Town (7)	290
63	Paulton Rovers (8)	2–2	Cirencester Town (8)	119
64	Gosport Borough (7)	1–0	Bristol Manor Farm (8)	160
65	Yate Town (8)	0–1	Moneyfields (8)	118
66	Thame United (8)	5–0	Wimborne Town (8)	99
67	Larkhall Athletic (8)	1–3	Farnborough (7)	130
68	Swindon Supermarine (8)	0–3	Hartley Wintney (8)	157
69	Hereford (7)	4–1	Weymouth (7)	1,552
70	Tiverton Town (7)	2–2	Banbury United (7)	248
71	Kidlington (8)	1–4	Slough Town (7)	201
72	Shortwood United (8)	2–0	Frome Town (7)	96
Sunday 29 October 2017
51	Thamesmead Town (8)	3–1	Brightlingsea Regent (7)	156
Replays
Monday 30 October 2017
54R	Haringey Borough (8)	1–0	Harrow Borough (7)	170
Tuesday 31 October 2017
6R	South Shields (8)	4–3 (a.e.t.)	Farsley Celtic (7)	1,012
9R	Ramsbottom United (8)	4–1 (a.e.t.)	Shaw Lane (7)	174
11R	Stalybridge Celtic (7)	5–1	Prescot Cables (8)	171
33R	Merstham (7)	0–2	Sittingbourne (8)	126
38R	Harlow Town (7)	4–2	Aylesbury (8)	121
40R	Bedford Town (8)	2–4	Brentwood Town (8)	145
41R	Heybridge Swifts (8)	2–1	Tonbridge Angels (7)	224
42R	Chalfont St Peter (8)	0–3	Bury Town (8)	81
55R	Folkestone Invicta (7)	1–1 (5–6 p)	Leiston (7)	301
57R	Egham Town (8)	P–P	Bowers & Pitsea (8)	-
59R	Thurrock (7)	1–4	Kingstonian (7)	84
63R	Cirencester Town (8)	0–4	Paulton Rovers (8)	109
70R	Banbury United (7)	3–2 (a.e.t.)	Tiverton Town (7)	230
Wednesday 1 November 2017
17R	Kidsgrove Athletic (8)	2–1	Newcastle Town (8)	189
47R	Grays Athletic (8)	0–2	Cray Wanderers (8)	152
Tuesday 7 November 2017
57R	Egham Town (8)	3–5 (a.e.t.)	Bowers & Pitsea (8)	77
Bowers & Pitsea removed from the competition after being determined to have played a suspended player in the initial match.

== Second round qualifying ==
Tie	Home team (tier)	Score	Away team (tier)	Att.
Saturday 11 November 2017
1	Lancaster City (7)	3–0	Stratford Town (7)	252
2	Kidsgrove Athletic (8)	0–2	Grantham Town (7)	242
3	Alvechurch (8)	1–5	Coalville Town (7)	213
4	Warrington Town (7)	1–1	Ashton United (7)	313
5	Altrincham (7)	4–1	Ramsbottom United (8)	781
6	Stalybridge Celtic (7)	3–2	Rushall Olympic (7)	240
7	Glossop North End (8)	4–3	Leek Town (8)	469
8	Stamford (8)	1–2	Droylsden (8)	297
9	Chasetown (8)	1–3	Workington (7)	257
10	Hednesford Town (7)	1–1	Cleethorpes Town (8)	369
11	Atherton Collieries (8)	1–5	Marine (7)	462
12	St Neots Town (7)	2–3	Stourbridge (7)	323
13	Barwell (7)	0–1	Mildenhall Town (8)	176
14	Stafford Rangers (7)	3–1	South Shields (8)	955
15	Chesham United (7)	3–1	Hitchin Town (7)	297
16	Taunton Town (8)	1–1	Beaconsfield Town (8)	476
17	Brentwood Town (8)	3–1	Needham Market (7)	166
18	Hereford (7)	0–0	Potters Bar Town (8)	1,368
19	Corinthian-Casuals (8)	1–3	Wingate & Finchley (7)	180
20	Lewes (8)	2–0	Bishop's Stortford (7)	568
21	Dorchester Town (7)	1–2	Heybridge Swifts (8)	319
22	Harlow Town (7)	2–1	Dulwich Hamlet (7)	363
23	Hendon (7)	3–0	Burgess Hill Town (7)	165
24	Ashford Town (8)	2–2	Kingstonian (7)	163
25	Maldon & Tiptree (8)	1–4	Slough Town (7)	179
26	Sittingbourne (8)	1–1	Haringey Borough (8)	134
27	Thamesmead Town (8)	0–1	Metropolitan Police (7)	82
28	Royston Town (7)	3–2	Leatherhead (7)	219
29	Hartley Wintney (8)	3–0	Gosport Borough (7)	216

Tie	Home team (tier)	Score	Away team (tier)	Att.
30	Farnborough (7)	3–3	Banbury United (7)	269
31	Thame United (8)	1–0	Worthing (7)	136
32	Paulton Rovers (8)	1–2	Shortwood United (8)	163
33	Margate (7)	P–P	Bowers & Pitsea (8)	-
Match postponed pending F.A. hearing on Wednesday 15 November regarding Bowers & Pitsea fielding an ineligible player in the previous round. Bowers & Pitsea's appeal was denied and Egham Town advanced to play Margate.
34	Billericay Town (7)	6–2	Bury Town (8)	1,376
35	Dorking Wanderers (7)	4–1	Leiston (7)	188
36	Moneyfields (8)	P–P	Cray Wanderers (8)	-
Tuesday 14 November 2017
36	Moneyfields (8)	1–1	Cray Wanderers (8)	148
Saturday 25 November 2017
33	Margate (7)	2–0	Egham Town (8)	370
Replays
Monday 13 November 2017
16R	Beaconsfield Town (8)	1–1 (6–7 p)	Taunton Town (8)	86
24R	Kingstonian (7)	2–0	Ashford Town (8)	175
26R	Haringey Borough (8)	1–0	Sittingbourne (8)	177
Tuesday 14 November 2017
4R	Ashton United (7)	2–2 (2–4 p)	Warrington Town (7)	163
18R	Potters Bar Town (8)	1–2	Hereford (7)	230
30R	Banbury United (7)	P–P	Farnborough (7)	-
Wednesday 15 November 2017
10R	Cleethorpes Town (8)	2–1	Hednesford Town (7)	225
Wednesday 22 November 2017
36R	Cray Wanderers (8)	4–1	Moneyfields (8)	139
Saturday 25 November 2017
30R	Banbury United (7)	2–3 (a.e.t.)	Farnborough (7)	380

== Third round qualifying ==
A total of 80 teams took part in this stage of the competition, all winners from the second round qualifying and 44 clubs from Level 6 of English football.

Tie	Home team (tier)	Score	Away team (tier)	Att.
Friday 24 November 2017
7	Darlington (6)	2–3	Harrogate Town (6)	1,127
Saturday 25 November 2017
1	Brackley Town (6)	4–0	Salford City (6)	428
2	York City (6)	3–1	Coalville Town (7)	1,001
3	Cleethorpes Town (8)	1–2	Spennymoor Town (6)	306
4	Grantham Town (7)	3–4	Chorley (6)	361
5	Tamworth (6)	2–2	Warrington Town (7)	468
6	AFC Telford United (6)	4–2	Droylsden (8)	522
8	Gainsborough Trinity (6)	2–0	Stafford Rangers (7)	299
9	Bradford Park Avenue (6)	1–1	Stourbridge (7)	256
10	Boston United (6)	2–2	Kidderminster Harriers (6)	732
11	Nuneaton Town (6)	5–1	North Ferriby United (6)	306
12	Stockport County (6)	2–2	Southport (6)	1,215
13	Blyth Spartans (6)	2–1	Stalybridge Celtic (7)	482
14	Glossop North End (8)	0–0	Workington (7)	368
15	Alfreton Town (6)	0–2	Altrincham (7)	329
16	Leamington (6)	3–1	Curzon Ashton (6)	249
17	Lancaster City (7)	1–0	Mildenhall Town (8)	242
18	Marine (7)	1–0	F.C. United of Manchester (6)	778
19	Lewes (8)	1–3	Truro City (6)	619
20	Havant & Waterlooville (6)	3–1	Dorking Wanderers (7)	233
21	East Thurrock United (6)	3–1	Shortwood United (8)	128
22	Taunton Town (8)	3–2	Concord Rangers (6)	479
23	Hemel Hempstead Town (6)	1–1	Bognor Regis Town (6)	301
25	Oxford City (6)	1–2	Hereford (7)	480
26	Hendon (7)	1–1	Slough Town (7)	251
27	Braintree Town (6)	3–0	Cray Wanderers (8)	214
28	Welling United (6)	0–1	Weston-super-Mare (6)	322
29	St Albans City (6)	3–1	Poole Town (6)	317
30	Metropolitan Police (7)	0–1	Wingate & Finchley (7)	63

Tie	Home team (tier)	Score	Away team (tier)	Att.
31	Whitehawk (6)	2–1	Chippenham Town (6)	138
32	Haringey Borough (8)	3–1	Thame United (8)	121
33	Brentwood Town (7)	1–2	Dartford (6)	297
34	Chesham United (7)	2–1	Gloucester City (6)	246
35	Hungerford Town (6)	0–2	Billericay Town (7)	261
36	Hampton & Richmond (6)	5–1	Harlow Town (7)	289
38	Wealdstone (6)	1–1	Chelmsford City (6)	520
39	Eastbourne Borough (6)	1–1	Royston Town (7)	277
Sunday 26 November 2017
40	Kingstonian (7)	2–2	Heybridge Swifts (8)	251
Tuesday 28 November 2017
37	Bath City (6)	0–0	Margate (7)	341
Wednesday 29 November 2017
24	Farnborough (7)	1–2	Hartley Wintney (8)	255
Replays
Monday 27 November 2017
9R	Stourbridge (7)	2–1	Bradford Park Avenue (6)	385
Tuesday 28 November 2017
5R	Warrington Town (7)	3–0	Tamworth (6)	223
10R	Kidderminster Harriers (6)	2–0	Boston United (6)	604
14R	Workington (7)	5–1	Glossop North End (8)	351
23R	Bognor Regis Town (6)	1–0	Hemel Hempstead Town (6)	306
26R	Slough Town (7)	1–1 (0–3 p)	Hendon (7)	626
39R	Royston Town (7)	2–2 (3–4 p)	Eastbourne Borough (6)	189
Wednesday 29 November 2017
12R	Southport (6)	0–3	Stockport County (6)	424
38R	Chelmsford City (6)	1–2	Wealdstone (6)	367
40R	Heybridge Swifts (8)	5–1	Kingstonian (7)	187
Tuesday 5 December 2017
37R	Margate (7)	2–2 (4–5 p)	Bath City (6)	275

== First round proper ==
A total of 64 teams took part in this stage of the competition, all winners from the third round qualifying and the clubs from Level 5 of English football.

Tie	Home team (tier)	Score	Away team (tier)	Att.
Saturday 16 December 2017
1	Solihull Moors (5)	A–A	Tranmere Rovers (5)	363
Match abandoned in the 43rd minute due to floodlight failure when the score was 0-1.
2	Blyth Spartans (6)	P–P	AFC Telford United (6)	-
3	Kidderminster Harriers (6)	2–1	York City (6)	1,138
4	Chorley (6)	1–3	Marine (7)	708
5	FC Halifax Town (5)	P–P	Macclesfield Town (5)	-
6	Spennymoor Town (6)	P–P	Gainsborough Trinity (6)	-
7	Chester (5)	2–2 (5–4 p)	A.F.C. Fylde (5)	886
8	Wrexham (5)	0–2	Harrogate Town (6)	1,370
9	Leamington (6)	0–1	Stourbridge (7)	404
10	Lancaster City (7)	1–3	Stockport County (6)	578
11	Warrington Town (7)	0–0	Altrincham (7)	545
12	Gateshead (5)	P–P	Guiseley (5)	-
13	Nuneaton Town (6)	0–1	Barrow (5)	415
14	Workington (7)	1–0	Hartlepool United (5)	771
15	Haringey Borough (8)	1–2	Leyton Orient (5)	1,133
16	Dover Athletic (5)	3–0	Eastbourne Borough (6)	424
17	Wealdstone (6)	1–0	Wingate & Finchley (7)	371
18	Billericay Town (7)	3–1	Havant & Waterlooville (6)	705
19	Chesham United (7)	P–P	Weston-super-Mare (6)	-
20	Sutton United (5)	1–0	Truro City (6)	576
21	Woking (5)	0–2	Maidenhead United (5)	648
22	Whitehawk (6)	1–2	St Albans City (6)	143
23	East Thurrock United (6)	4–0	Aldershot Town (5)	252
24	Hendon (7)	2–1	Bath City (6)	256
25	Ebbsfleet United (5)	2–1	Eastleigh (5)	733
27	Torquay United (5)	0–4	Maidstone United (5)	804
28	Hartley Wintney (8)	0–2	Bromley (5)	482
29	Braintree Town (6)	0–0	Brackley Town (6)	249

Tie	Home team (tier)	Score	Away team (tier)	Att.
30	Taunton Town (8)	1–4	Bognor Regis Town (6)	508
31	Hampton & Richmond (6)	1–1	Heybridge Swifts (8)	294
32	Dartford (6)	1–1	Boreham Wood (5)	607
Sunday 17 December 2017
26	Hereford (7)	3–2	Dagenham & Redbridge (5)	1,518
Monday 18 December 2017
1	Solihull Moors (5)	2–0	Tranmere Rovers (5)	215
Tuesday 19 December 2017
2	Blyth Spartans (6)	1–0	AFC Telford United (6)	476
5	FC Halifax Town (5)	P–P	Macclesfield Town (5)	-
6	Spennymoor Town (6)	P–P	Gainsborough Trinity (6)	-
12	Gateshead (5)	P–P	Guiseley (5)	-
19	Chesham United (7)	0–2	Weston-super-Mare (6)	193
Wednesday 20 December 2017
12	Gateshead (5)	2–1 (a.e.t.)	Guiseley (5)	290
Saturday 30 December 2017
6	Spennymoor Town (6)	P–P	Gainsborough Trinity (6)	-
Thursday 4 January 2018
6	Spennymoor Town (6)	P–P	Gainsborough Trinity (6)	-
Tuesday 9 January 2018
5	FC Halifax Town (5)	1–0	Macclesfield Town (5)	503
6	Spennymoor Town (6)	4–4 (5–3 p)	Gainsborough Trinity (6)	239
Replays
Tuesday 19 December 2017
11R	Altrincham (7)	1–2	Warrington Town (7)	453
29R	Brackley Town (6)	2–0	Braintree Town (6)	238
31R	Heybridge Swifts (8)	3–2	Hampton & Richmond (6)	206
32R	Boreham Wood (5)	2–2 (3–1 p)	Dartford (6)	173

== Second round proper ==
Tie	Home team (tier)	Score	Away team (tier)	Att.
Saturday 13 January 2018
1	Ebbsfleet United (5)	1–1	Warrington Town (7)	911
2	Kidderminster Harriers (6)	2–2	Stockport County (6)	1,348
3	East Thurrock United (6)	1–0	Chester (5)	347
4	Bognor Regis Town (6)	1–2 (a.e.t.)	Leyton Orient (5)	1,371
5	Brackley Town (6)	0–0	Barrow (5)	512
6	Weston-super-Mare (6)	1–1	Workington (7)	361
7	Billericay Town (7)	3–2	Stourbridge (7)	1,081
8	FC Halifax Town (5)	1–4	Maidenhead United (5)	802
9	Maidstone United (5)	2–1	Heybridge Swifts (8)	1,276
10	Dover Athletic (5)	4–3	Marine (7)	565
11	Gateshead (5)	3–3	Boreham Wood (5)	284
12	Wealdstone (6)	1–0	Hereford (7)	909

Tie	Home team (tier)	Score	Away team (tier)	Att.
13	Sutton United (5)	3–0	Hendon (7)	785
14	Blyth Spartans (6)	1–4	Bromley (5)	647
15	Spennymoor Town (6)	2–0	Solihull Moors (5)	570
16	St Albans City (6)	1–1	Harrogate Town (6)	634
Replays
Tuesday 16 January 2018
1R	Warrington Town (7)	2–0	Ebbsfleet United (5)	334
2R	Stockport County (6)	3–0	Kidderminster Harriers (6)	883
5R	Barrow (5)	0–2	Brackley Town (6)	430
6R	Workington (7)	2–1	Weston-super-Mare (6)	576
11R	Boreham Wood (5)	1–2	Gateshead (5)	183
16R	Harrogate Town (6)	5–0	St Albans City (6)	362

== Third round proper ==
Tie	Home team (tier)	Score	Away team (tier)	Att.
Saturday 3 February 2018
1	Harrogate Town (6)	2–2	Billericay Town (7)	846
2	Maidstone United (5)	2–2	Gateshead (5)	1,186
3	Maidenhead United (5)	1–1	Stockport County (6)	855
4	Wealdstone (6)	2–1	Warrington Town (7)	601
5	Brackley Town (6)	3–1	Sutton United (5)	767
6	Dover Athletic (5)	3–4	Leyton Orient (5)	1,016
7	Spennymoor Town (6)	1–1	East Thurrock United (6)	743
8	Workington (7)	1–1	Bromley (5)	890

Tie	Home team (tier)	Score	Away team (tier)	Att.
Replays
Tuesday 6 February 2018
1R	Billericay Town (7)	3–2	Harrogate Town (6)	820
2R	Gateshead (5)	3–0	Maidstone United (5)	338
3R	Stockport County (6)	3–2 (a.e.t.)	Maidenhead United (5)	1,131
7R	East Thurrock United (6)	2–5	Spennymoor Town (6)	236
8R	Bromley (5)	7–1	Workington (7)	604

== Fourth round proper ==
Tie	Home team (tier)	Score	Away team (tier)	Att.
Saturday 24 February 2018
1	Stockport County (6)	1–1	Brackley Town (6)	2,213
2	Billericay Town (7)	2–5	Wealdstone (6)	1,823
3	Leyton Orient (5)	3–3	Gateshead (5)	3,771
4	Bromley (5)	0–0	Spennymoor Town (6)	1,504
Replays
Tuesday 27 February 2018
1R	Brackley Town (6)	P–P	Stockport County (6)	-
4R	Spennymoor Town (6)	P–P	Bromley (5)	-

Tie	Home team (tier)	Score	Away team (tier)	Att.
Tuesday 6 March 2018
1R	Brackley Town (6)	2–1	Stockport County (6)	560
3R	Gateshead (5)	3–2	Leyton Orient (5)	684
4R	Spennymoor Town (6)	P–P	Bromley (5)	-
Tuesday 13 March 2018
4R	Spennymoor Town (6)	P–P	Bromley (5)	-
Wednesday 14 March 2018
4R	Spennymoor Town (6)	1–2	Bromley (5)	802
Match played at Blackwell Meadows, Darlington.

== Semi-finals ==
Semi final fixtures are due to be played on 17 March and 24 March 2018, with the second leg going to extra time and penalties if required.

=== First leg ===
17 March 2018
15:00

Brackley Town (6)	1–0	Wealdstone (6)
Gudger 85'

St. James Park, Brackley
Attendance: 1,250
Referee: Charles Breakspear

17 March 2018
15:00

Bromley (5)	3–2	Gateshead (5)
Hanlan 15' (pen.); Dennis 51', 82'		Peniket 1'; Johnson 40'

Hayes Lane, Bromley
Attendance: 1,254
Referee: Dean Whitestone

=== Second leg ===
24 March 2018
15:00

Wealdstone (6)	0–2	Brackley Town (6)
		Byrne 55'; Williams 81'

Grosvenor Vale, Ruislip
Attendance: 2,008
Referee: Gavin Ward

Brackley Town won 3–0 on aggregate

24 March 2018
15:00

Gateshead (5)	1–1	Bromley (5)
Barrow 69'		Kerr 5' (o.g.)

International Stadium, Gateshead
Attendance: 2,264
Referee: Ben Toner

Bromley won 4-3 on aggregate

== Final ==
20 May 2018
16:15 BST

Brackley Town	1–1 (a.e.t.)	Bromley
Johnson 90+6' (o.g.)	Report	Bugiel 19'
Penalties
Byrne (penalty missed); Williams (penalty scored); Diggin (penalty scored); Armson (penalty scored); G. Walker (penalty scored); Brown (penalty scored)	5–4	Sutherland (penalty scored); Raymond (penalty scored); Hanlan (penalty scored); Rees (penalty scored); Bugiel (penalty missed); Holland (penalty missed)

Wembley Stadium, London
Attendance: 31,430
Referee: Chris Kavanagh
