= Quadrille Ball =

Quadrille Ball is an annual society ball that has taken place in New York City each year since 1961, usually in January or February. It is a non-profit event that benefits the Germanistic Society, which in turn awards scholarships for the exchange of American and German graduate and undergraduate students. The event is normally held at The Pierre in Manhattan.

The main performance at the ball is the Quadrille dance, hence the name of the ball. The Quadrille dance is performed each year by a new batch of volunteer dancers (female and male, generally ages 21–30) who are paired up as couples. Most years there are 20 couples, but this number can vary slightly from year to year, although the total number of couples in the performance must be divisible by the number four, since the root word "quad" refers to the number four, and couples are arranged in squares of four couples each, as in American square dancing. Each couple is announced as they are first presented and make their way onto the ballroom floor. There is also a Caller who keeps announcing what steps are to be done next, throughout the dance. The tempo of the Quadrille dance is slow and stately, which lends an elegant and aristocratic air to the performance. The steps date back to the 17th century, when they were done by nobility in the royal courts of Europe. Since the Quadrille Ball always presents the same exact dance steps each year, the dancers from previous years (called alumni) simply pass down the steps to the new dancers, so therefore the ball does not need a choreographer to create new steps each year. After the Quadrille dance presentation, any alumni present are invited up for an honorary alumni waltz (improvisational), and then there is social dancing the rest of the night to a live orchestra that plays ballroom dance music (waltz, tango, foxtrot, swing, Latin, etc.).

Dancers are only supposed to perform once, and then they become alumni and have the option of applying to join the Junior Committee, which helps to train the next year's dancers. Weekly rehearsals, which are organized by the Junior Committee, take place during the three months leading up to the ball (November, December, and January). After-parties are arranged following each rehearsal, in order to encourage camaraderie and social interaction among participants, and often are held at the private residences of alumni. New dancersare usually referred by alumni, but the ball also considers applications from people who have no prior connection to the ball.

One interesting thing about this ball is that even though it is a German organized ball, the Caller announces the steps entirely in French. This can be explained by the fact that French used to be the universal language of European courts centuries ago when the Quadrille dance was invented, and therefore the steps are codified in the French language.

During the 57th Quadrille Ball, on January 28, 2017, Charlie O'Loughlin participated as a dancer and danced with Debbie Chiang He was featured in the New York Times at the event.
