= Dean Glover =

English footballer (born 1963)

Personal information
- Full name: Dean Victor Glover
- Date of birth: 29 December 1963 (age 62)
- Place of birth: West Bromwich, England
- Height: 5 ft 10 in (1.78 m)
- Positions: Defender; midfielder

Youth career
- 1980–1981: Aston Villa

Senior career*
| Years | Team | Apps | (Gls) |
| 1981–1987 | Aston Villa | 28 | (0) |
| 1987 | → Sheffield United (loan) | 5 | (0) |
| 1987–1989 | Middlesbrough | 50 | (5) |
| 1989–1998 | Port Vale | 363 | (15) |
| 1998–1999 | Kidderminster Harriers | | |
| Total | | 446 | (20) |

Managerial career
- 2007: Port Vale (caretaker)
- 2008–2009: Port Vale
- * Club domestic league appearances and goals

Dean Victor Glover (born 29 December 1963) is an English former football player and manager. A cultured and stylish defender, he had the ball control skills of a midfielder. He played 541 league and cup games in a 17-year career in the English Football League.

He started his career at Aston Villa in 1980 before he moved on to Middlesbrough seven years later. He spent two seasons at "Boro", helping the club to promotion out of the Second Division via the play-offs in 1988, before he was sold to Port Vale in February 1989 for £200,000. He spent nine years at Vale, becoming a club legend for his service. During that time, he helped the club to win promotion out of the Third Division via the play-offs in 1989, and then out of the Second Division in 1993–94. He also played in the club's victory in the 1993 Football League Trophy final, as well as the defeat in the final of the Anglo-Italian Cup in 1996. He was also named to the PFA Team of the Year in 1993–94. He moved on to non-League Kidderminster Harriers in 1998 before retiring the following year.

He joined the back-room staff at Port Vale and was promoted to first-team manager in October 2008, vacating the post in May 2009. He returned to a youth team coaching role in July 2012. His son Danny was a striker at the club until he was released at the end of his contract in 2010.

== Playing career ==
=== Aston Villa ===
Despite being a Birmingham City fan, Glover began his footballing career with hometown club Aston Villa, progressing through the youth team ranks from the age of 14 to eventually sign professional terms in December 1981 following an 18-month apprenticeship. He made his debut under Tony Barton on 11 January 1984, in a 3–0 defeat to Norwich City at Carrow Road in an FA Cup Third Round Replay.

He never really became a first-team fixture in Graham Turner's First Division side, and also played little part in Billy McNeill's reign of 1986–87 that saw Villa relegated into the Second Division. He spent a brief period in 1987 on loan at Billy McEwan's Sheffield United. Still, he made only five league appearances for the Second Division side. In his six years at Villa Park, he made just 39 top-flight appearances, scoring one goal.

=== Middlesbrough ===
Glover's signed with Middlesbrough for a £60,000 fee in June 1987. Manager Bruce Rioch played him as a ball-winning midfielder. "Boro" won promotion into the First Division in 1987–88; they had finished behind second place Aston Villa on goals scored, but managed to beat Chelsea 2–1 on aggregate in the play-off final. Glover played in both the 2–0 victory at Ayresome Park and the 1–0 defeat at Stamford Bridge.

However, the club struggled in 1988–89, and Glover was sold on before Middlesbrough were relegated back into the Second Division. He had been at Middlesbrough for just under 18 months and made a total of 61 appearances, scoring seven goals; during this time, he played as a midfielder as Gary Pallister and Tony Mowbray were well established at centre-back.

=== Port Vale ===
Glover was signed by John Rudge in February 1989 for a then-club record £200,000 fee; Rudge intended him to be a replacement for injured defenders Phil Sproson and Bob Hazell. He became an instant hit with the Port Vale fans as he marked England international Steve Bull out of the game on his debut, a goalless draw with Wolverhampton Wanderers. He went on to play both legs of the play-off final victory over Bristol Rovers, as a Robbie Earle inspired Vale played their last game of Third Division football thanks to a 2–1 victory.

Glover became a mainstay of Vale's defence throughout one of Vale's most successful periods, forming an excellent partnership with fellow centre-half Neil Aspin. He was part of the Vale side that won the Football League Trophy in 1993; Vale beat Stockport County 2–1, and Glover played a major part in the buildup to Bernie Slaven's goal, the second of the match. He also helped the club to reach the play-off final that year by scoring against Stockport at the semi-final stage; Vale went on to lose 3–0 to West Bromwich Albion in the Wembley final. He was a big part of the promotion campaign of the 1993–94 season, which saw Vale return to the First Division – he was an ever-present. He was selected in the PFA's Second Division team of the year.

He then had a spell battling injury as he ruptured his ankle ligament in late 1994 and also suffered with back trouble, which kept him out of action until April 1995; he faced further injury woes in January 1996, when his old ankle injury returned. He managed to recover from these problems to help Vale to the final of the Anglo-Italian Cup in 1996. He then played a major role in the Vale side that achieved the club's highest finish since 1931, when they finished eighth in the second tier in 1996–97.

Glover left Port Vale at the end of the 1997–98 season as Vale avoided relegation with a final day 4–0 win at Huddersfield. He had spent nine years at the club, becoming a crowd favourite in the process for his committed displays at centre half and right-back. His many years with the "Valiants" entitled him to a testimonial game, in which singer Robbie Williams also played. In December 2025, supporters voted him onto the all-time Port Vale XI.

=== Kidderminster Harriers ===
The final year of his career was seen out at Conference National side Kidderminster Harriers. Glover was a regular fixture in defence for a "Kiddy" side that finished 15th in 1998–99. He decided to retire at the end of the campaign.

== Style of play ==
Glover played as an aggressive tough-tackling midfielder for Middlesbrough before being converted to a ball-playing centre-back at Port Vale. He was an intelligent player who had a good ability to read the game; he was also a good passer, though lacked pace and athleticism.

== Management career ==
=== Coach at Port Vale ===
Glover returned to Port Vale as a coach in Brian Horton's management team. However, he left the club in April 2002. A short spell as Director of football at non-League side Stone Dominoes followed before he came back to Vale Park in February 2004, when he was appointed assistant to the new manager Martin Foyle.

Glover took over as caretaker manager when Foyle left the club in September 2007. Glover was in contention for the permanent manager position, but his record of guiding Vale to only two wins from eight games contributed to his failure to get the job. After defeat to Morecambe at Christie Park in the Football League Trophy, Glover likened his side to a "pub team" and admitted that "this team is going nowhere". When Farsley Celtic manager Lee Sinnott was appointed as Port Vale manager, Glover returned to the assistant role. Vale went on to lose their League One status in 2007–08; they were 13 points short of safety, only finishing ahead of Luton Town due to the latter being deducted ten points for entering administration.

=== Manager at Port Vale ===
In September 2008, Sinnott left Port Vale, leaving Glover again with the role of caretaker manager in a shared role alongside Andy Porter. This led to speculation about which of the two would be made manager. Glover was the expected choice and was duly appointed as manager on 6 October.

A win at Shrewsbury Town instigated a run of four away wins out of five. However, Vale soon returned to their poor form and slid back down the table. At the end of October, former Vale star Dave Brammer joined on loan from Millwall, and would join permanently in the January transfer window. The next month Scott Brown also arrived on loan from Cheltenham Town, and would also join on a permanent transfer two months later. This is also what happened with defender Gareth Owen, who arrived after leaving Stockport County following a bust-up with Jim Gannon. Notts County player Neil MacKenzie also joined on loan. Attempts to bring back Chris Birchall on loan failed. Leaving Burslem was Chris Slater, who returned to former club Chasetown. In December, Andy Porter left the club's backroom staff after 17 years at the club, highlighting the unrest in the camp. Both Porter and Mark Grew had turned down offers to become Glover's assistant.

In January, striker Luke Rodgers was released from his contract after a bust-up with Glover, and immediately signed with Yeovil Town. Shane Tudor retired due to injury on 21 January. Glover signed loanee Lee Collins to a permanent contract, after Wolverhampton Wanderers agreed to release the young defender. Brammer also signed a short-term contract with the club after securing his release from Millwall. Glover also brought in Pakistan international Adnan Ahmed on loan from Tranmere Rovers. Glover stated the club's revised aim was a top-half finish.

By February 2009, with the club in the bottom depths of the bottom tier of the Football League, fans organised protests at Glover's leadership. Many chanted 'Glover Out' during home defeats, and even a large banner was unveiled on 28 February 3–1 defeat to Luton Town, with organised protests involving hundreds of supporters being held before and after the game. Glover accepted he was not the popular choice to take over from Sinnott and described himself as a "dead man walking". Many fans, as well as local journalists and pundits, questioned Glover's tactical decisions, team selection and managerial abilities in general. Some fans even started booing his son in an attempt to 'get to' Glover himself. Glover attempted to arrest his team's slide down the table by signing Carlisle United striker Kevin Gall on loan. He failed to score in seven games with the club, and returned to Carlisle after picking up a calf injury. In March, Kyle Perry was allowed to join local non-League side Northwich Victoria, after being told he had no future at Vale. In his place came loanee winger Paul Marshall from Manchester City. On 23 March, Anyon broke his leg at Saltergate in a defeat to Chesterfield.

Slow season ticket sales pressured both Glover's supporters and detractors in the Port Vale boardroom to consider appointing a new manager in the summer of 2009. Fans again protested after the final home game, a 1–1 draw with Wycombe Wanderers, with Glover having to be escorted from the ground. Despite the backing of several players in the local press, it was ultimately the poor response to the club's season ticket offer and poor results that were to prove Glover's downfall as the club sold less than 100 season tickets in the two weeks following the release of the scheme, with many supporters claiming they would not consider renewing until the club had a new managerial team in place. On 1 May 2009, the club confirmed that Glover would not be the manager for the 2009–10 season. Instead he was offered the position of youth team manager, which was vacated by Andy Porter in December 2008. The next day, Vale defeated Barnet 2–1 on the last day of Glover's reign, his son Danny scoring the club's last goal of the season. During Glover's seven-month reign, the club won 12 out of 39 games and finished 18th in League Two.

Player Gareth Owen later said he was "someone I have the utmost respect for as a person... Deano was a nice guy, but things just didn't work out for him as manager. He had some good ideas as a coach, but I don't think the players respected him enough as a manager." Chairman Bill Bratt also made the following statement regarding Glover's sacking:

Dean has been offered another role at the club in which he would work alongside Mark Grew with the youth team. We would like to thank Dean for taking the helm but this is a results game and the results have not gone as well as everybody would have liked.

On 21 May, it was confirmed that Glover had left the club after turning down the youth team job and was opting for new pastures after an 18-year association with Port Vale as a player, coach and manager.

=== Return to coaching ===
As Glover looked to get back into football management, he applied for the manager's job at Hednesford Town of the Southern Football League; however, he was beaten to the position by Simon Line. In March 2010, he expressed an interest in the vacant management position at Nantwich Town of the Northern Premier League. However, the club chose to appoint Darren Tinson and Kevin Street as joint player-managers. He was also linked with the management position at Stafford Rangers. He made a return to Port Vale as a youth team coach in July 2012. Following Micky Adams's resignation and Rob Page's promotion to manager Glover was elevated to first-team coach in November 2014. He lasted in the role until May 2015. At that point he became Vale's chief scout. He was credited with bringing Anthony Grant to the club. He stepped down from the role in December 2016 due to a family commitment.

== Career statistics ==
=== Playing statistics ===
Appearances and goals by club, season and competition
| Club | Season | League | | | FA Cup | | Other (Note: Includes League Cup, Football League Trophy, English Football League play-offs, Full Members Cup, and Anglo-Italian Cup.) | | Total | |
| Club | Season | Division | Apps | Goals | Apps | Goals | Apps | Goals | Apps | Goals |
|---|---|---|---|---|---|---|---|---|---|---|
| Aston Villa | 1983–84 | First Division | 0 | 0 | 1 | 0 | 0 | 0 | 1 | 0 |
| Aston Villa | 1984–85 | First Division | 5 | 0 | 0 | 0 | 0 | 0 | 5 | 0 |
| Aston Villa | 1985–86 | First Division | 18 | 0 | 2 | 0 | 7 | 1 | 27 | 1 |
| Aston Villa | 1986–87 | First Division | 5 | 0 | 0 | 0 | 1 | 0 | 6 | 0 |
| Aston Villa | Total | | 28 | 0 | 3 | 0 | 8 | 1 | 39 | 1 |
| Sheffield United (loan) | 1986–87 | Second Division | 5 | 0 | 0 | 0 | 0 | 0 | 5 | 0 |
| Middlesbrough | 1987–88 | Second Division | 38 | 4 | 4 | 0 | 9 | 0 | 51 | 4 |
| Middlesbrough | 1988–89 | First Division | 12 | 1 | 1 | 0 | 2 | 2 | 15 | 3 |
| Middlesbrough | Total | | 50 | 5 | 5 | 0 | 11 | 2 | 66 | 7 |
| Port Vale | 1988–89 | Third Division | 22 | 0 | 0 | 0 | 4 | 0 | 26 | 0 |
| Port Vale | 1989–90 | Second Division | 44 | 4 | 3 | 0 | 5 | 0 | 52 | 4 |
| Port Vale | 1990–91 | Second Division | 41 | 1 | 2 | 0 | 3 | 0 | 46 | 1 |
| Port Vale | 1991–92 | Second Division | 46 | 1 | 1 | 0 | 6 | 0 | 53 | 1 |
| Port Vale | 1992–93 | Second Division | 39 | 3 | 3 | 0 | 10 | 3 | 52 | 6 |
| Port Vale | 1993–94 | Second Division | 46 | 3 | 5 | 0 | 6 | 0 | 57 | 3 |
| Port Vale | 1994–95 | First Division | 29 | 0 | 2 | 1 | 4 | 0 | 35 | 1 |
| Port Vale | 1995–96 | First Division | 29 | 0 | 2 | 0 | 4 | 1 | 35 | 1 |
| Port Vale | 1996–97 | First Division | 42 | 2 | 1 | 0 | 5 | 0 | 48 | 2 |
| Port Vale | 1997–98 | First Division | 25 | 1 | 1 | 0 | 1 | 0 | 27 | 1 |
| Port Vale | Total | | 363 | 15 | 20 | 1 | 48 | 4 | 431 | 20 |
| Career total | | | 446 | 20 | 28 | 1 | 67 | 7 | 541 | 28 |

=== Managerial statistics ===
Managerial record by team and tenure
| Team | From | To | Record | | | | |
| Team | From | To | P | W | D | L | Win % |
|---|---|---|---|---|---|---|---|
| Port Vale (caretaker) | 26 September 2007 | 5 November 2007 | 8 | 2 | 1 | 5 | 25.0 |
| Port Vale (caretaker) | 23 September 2008 | 6 October 2008 | 2 | 0 | 0 | 2 | 0.0 |
| Port Vale | 6 October 2008 | 2 May 2009 | 39 | 12 | 8 | 19 | 30.8 |
| Total | | | 49 | 14 | 9 | 26 | 28.6 |

== Honours ==
Middlesbrough

- Football League Second Division play-offs: 1988

Port Vale

- Football League Third Division play-offs: 1989
- Football League Trophy: 1992–93
- Football League Second Division second-place promotion: 1993–94
- Anglo-Italian Cup runner-up: 1996

Individual

- PFA Team of the Year: 1993–94 Second Division
- Port Vale Hall of Fame: inducted 2026 (inaugural)
