= 2007–08 Port Vale F.C. season =

Port Vale F.C.
2007–08 season
- Owner: Valiant 2001
- Chairman: Bill Bratt
- Manager: Martin Foyle (until 26 September); Dean Glover (caretaker 26 September – 5 November); Lee Sinnott (from 5 November)
- Stadium: Vale Park
- Football League One: 23rd (38 points)
- FA Cup: Second Round (eliminated by Chasetown)
- League Cup: First Round (eliminated by Wrexham)
- Football League Trophy: Preliminary Round (eliminated by Morecambe)
- Player of the Year: Paul Harsley
- Top goalscorer: League: Luke Rodgers (9); All: Luke Rodgers (12)
- Highest home attendance: 7,908 vs. Leeds United, 15 March 2008
- Lowest home attendance: 2,730 vs. Morecambe, 10 November 2007
- Average home league attendance: 4,417
- Biggest win: 3–0 vs. Cheltenham Town, 2 October 2007
- Biggest defeat: 0–6 vs. Swindon Town, 19 April 2008
Home colours	Away colours

The 2007–08 season was Port Vale's 96th season of football in the English Football League, and fourth-successive season in League One. The season began under manager Martin Foyle, but following a series of disappointing results, he departed in September. Dean Glover briefly served as caretaker before Lee Sinnott took over in November. Despite several loan signings, Vale struggled throughout the season, finishing second-from-bottom with 38 points, resulting in relegation to League Two.

In cup competitions, the club faced early exits. They were eliminated in the Second Round of the FA Cup by Southern League side Chasetown, a club five divisions below Vale. In both the League Cup and the Football League Trophy, Vale were knocked out in the First Round, each time following a penalty shoot-out defeat. Throughout the season, there was a significant turnover of players as Sinnott attempted to rebuild the squad in preparation for a promotion push the following season.

On the field, Luke Rodgers emerged as the club's top scorer, netting 12 goals in all competitions, with 9 in the league. Midfielder Paul Harsley was named Player of the Year for his consistent performances. The season was marked by a 6–0 home defeat to Swindon Town in April, highlighting the challenges faced throughout the campaign. Average home league attendance stood at 4,417, with the highest being 7,908 against Leeds United in March, and the lowest at 2,730 against Morecambe in November.

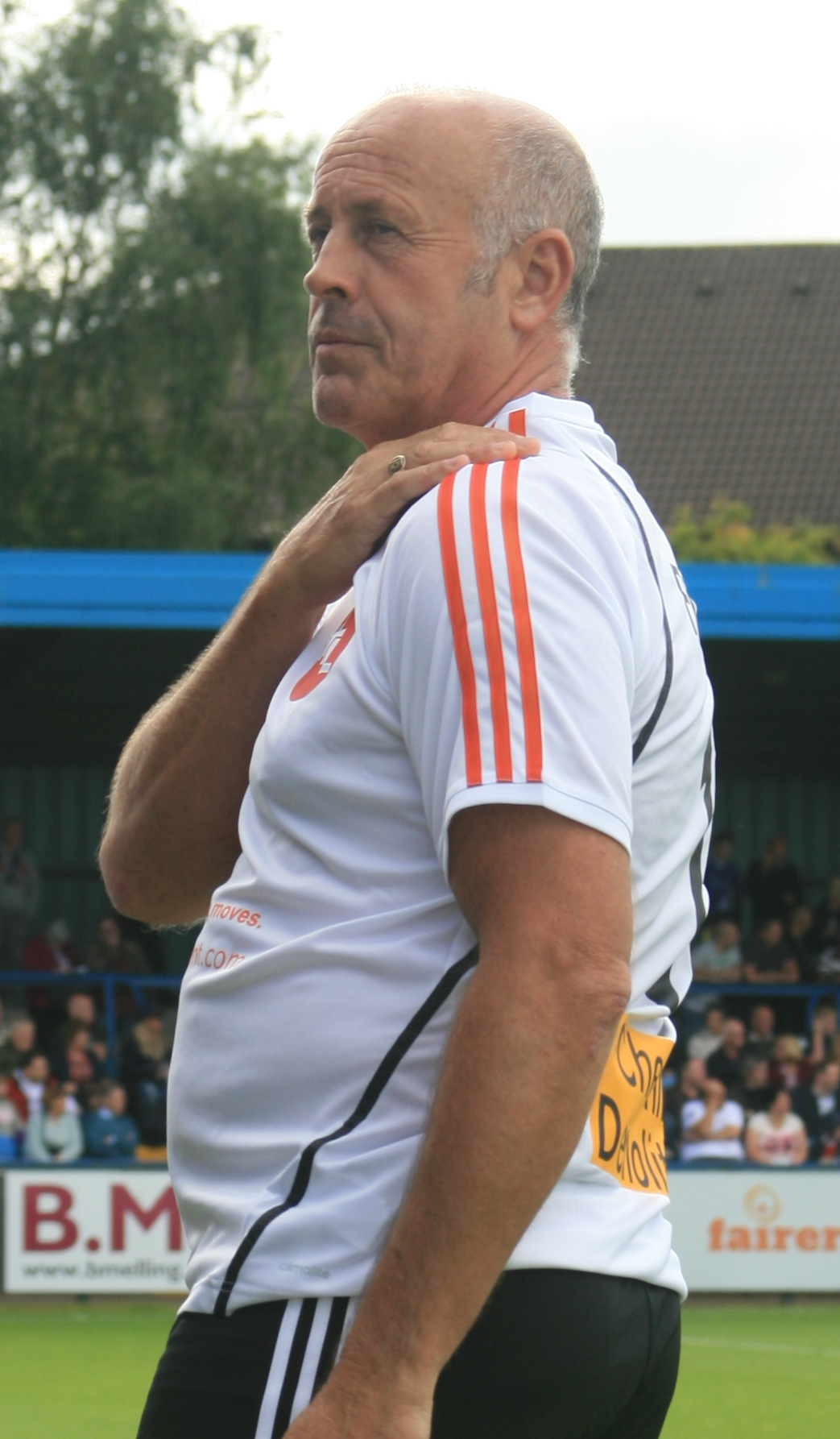
Manager Martin Foyle left the club in September.

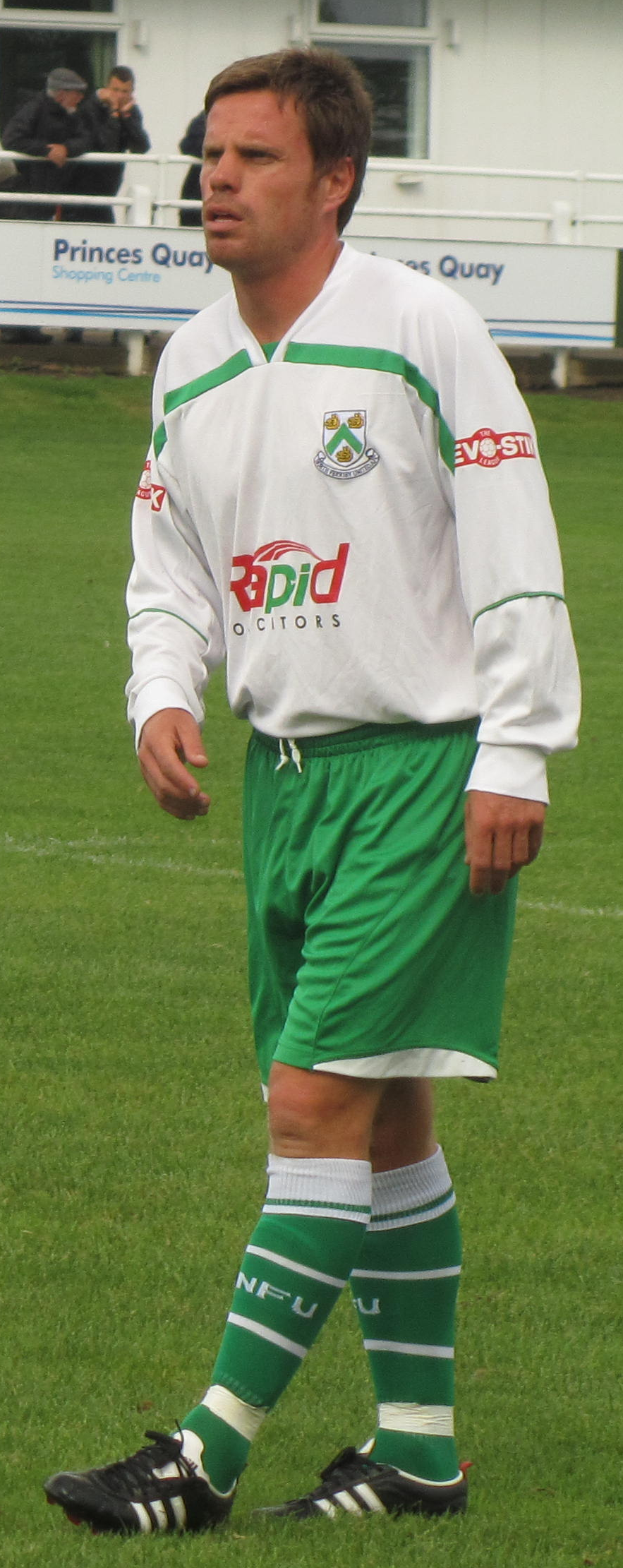
Player of the Year Paul Harsley left at the end of the season.

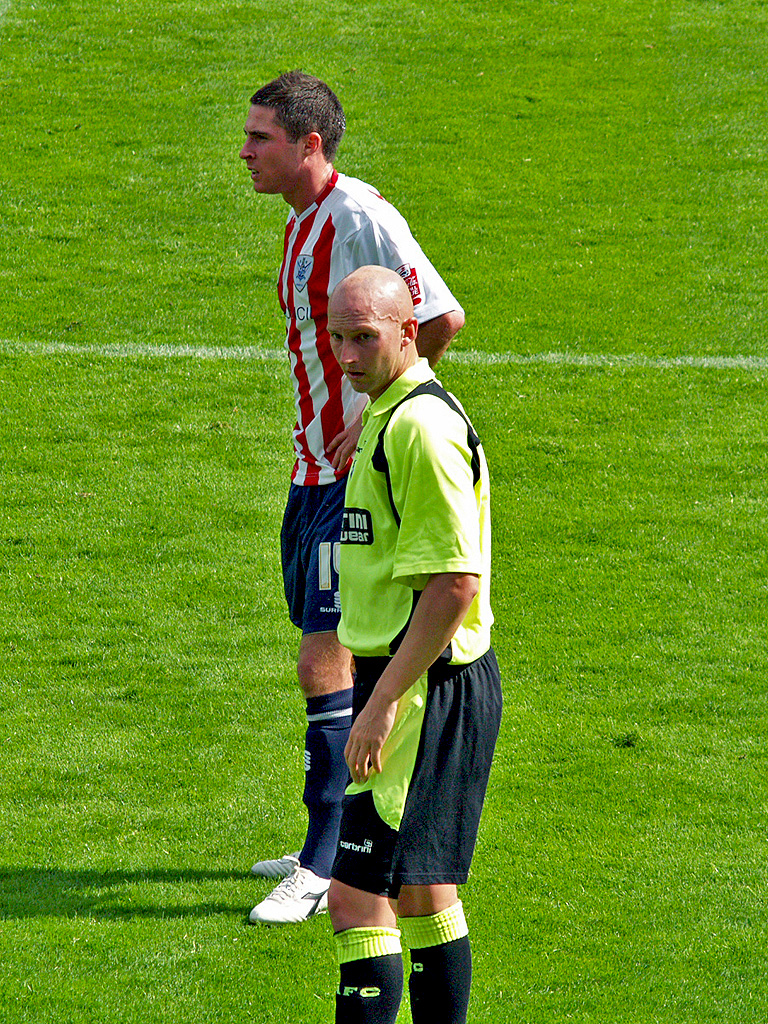
Danny Whitaker played 45 games but left at the end of the season.

== Overview ==
=== League One ===
The pre-season saw Martin Foyle sign Wolverhampton Wanderers defender Keith Lowe on a season-long loan, and both Paul Edwards and Craig Rocastle from Oldham Athletic. He also signed Marc Richards from Barnsley, as well as Shane Tudor and Justin Miller from Leyton Orient. Calum Willock also joined on a short-term deal, as did Southampton loanee David McGoldrick, and Chester City's veteran defender Ashley Westwood. However, an audacious attempt to land Liverpool legend Robbie Fowler failed.

The season started with just five points in the opening six games, with just one goal scored from open play. The solitary win came at AFC Bournemouth, with Luke Rodgers scoring the solitary goal of the game. A few games into the season Akpo Sodje was sold to Sheffield Wednesday for an undisclosed fee. With only two disappointing mid-table finishes to his name, and with Vale lying 23rd in the league, Foyle left the club by mutual consent on 26 September. Caretaker manager Dean Glover was disappointed with the players, comparing them to a pub team.

In October, Glover signed teenage midfielder Will Atkinson joined on loan from Hull City and left-back Adam Eckersley on loan from Manchester United. On 5 November, Farsley Celtic manager Lee Sinnott was appointed as the new Vale boss. This decision caused Dean Glover to consider his position at the club, though he eventually chose to remain as Sinnott's assistant. Sinnott warned of big changes at the club. Young defender Charlie O'Loughlin was then loaned out to Nantwich Town, and Shane Tudor was sent out on loan to Shrewsbury Town. Arriving at the club were midfielders Mark Salmon (Wolverhampton Wanderers) and Marc Laird (Manchester City) on short loan deals.

In January, goalkeeper Mark Goodlad was forced to retire due to injury, and young Joe Anyon faced criticism from the fans for his performances. Adam Eckersley then returned to the club after his release from Manchester United, as Sinnott's first non-loan signing. Sinnott then signed Dave Mulligan from Scunthorpe United on a short-term contract. Midfielder David Howland also arrived on loan from Birmingham City, and would join the club permanently at the end of the season. Fellow Birmingham player Krystian Pearce also signed on loan, though would impress enough to win a longer stay with Birmingham. Sinnott then raided another Birmingham club, this time Aston Villa, to bring Australian teenager Chris Herd on a one-month loan, as well as Swedish youngster Tobias Mikaelsson. He also allowed Rocastle to join Gillingham on a two-week loan. Sinnott also completed the signings of Chasetown pair Chris Slater and Kyle Perry, who left their jobs to become full-time professional footballers.

In February, O'Loughlin was loaned out to Hinckley United. On 2 February, Vale twice took the lead away at Bristol Rovers only to lose the game 3–2 from two late goals, whilst Herd was shown a straight red card shortly before full-time. After the club lost a 2–0 lead at Victoria Park to lose 3–2 against Hartlepool United, club legend Jon McCarthy questioned the team's mental strength. On 15 March, Vale played out a 3–3 draw with Leeds United after coming from two goals down at half-time and then equalising again from a Rodgers header in injury time.

Relegation could have been confirmed on 5 April; however, the team rallied to a 3–2 win at promotion-chasing Brighton & Hove Albion with Richards scoring a brace. Craig Rocastle's contract was terminated by mutual consent. He moved to play for Greek club Thrasyvoulos. Teenage goalkeeper Chris Martin made his debut on 19 April, as Vale were on the end of a 6–0 defeat by Swindon Town at The County Ground. Despite just two defeats in the final ten games of the season, Vale had long been relegated.

They finished in 23rd place with 38 points, above Luton Town only because the "Hatters" were hit with a ten-point deduction. Vale were twelve points behind Crewe Alexandra, who finished one place above the relegation zone. Luke Rodgers was the club's top scorer with twelve goals in all competitions. There was a distinct lack of goals in the side, though their goals conceded tally of 81 was the highest in the league.

At the end of the season there was an exodus of players: Robin Hulbert (Darlington); Colin Miles (Woking); Jason Talbot (Livingston); Mark McGregor (Altrincham); Joe Cardle (Airdrie United); Adam Eckersley (Horsens); Dave Mulligan (Wellington Phoenix); Justin Miller (Chelmsford City); Charlie O'Loughlin (Nantwich Town); as well as club captain George Pilkington (Luton Town). Sinnott claimed this cull was necessary to turn the club around. Danny Whitaker rejected Vale's contract offer, and their revised offer, to move off to Oldham Athletic. Player of the Year Paul Harsley also turned down a new deal, and instead signed with Chesterfield. Marc Richards discussed a £100,000 move to Cheltenham Town, though chose to stay in Burslem.

=== Finances ===
The club had to make monthly repayments of around £19,000 for a £2.25 million loan from the local council in 2005. The club's shirt sponsorship came from Sennheiser.

=== Cup competitions ===
In the FA Cup, Sinnott's first cup game in charge saw Vale take revenge on Morecambe with a 2–0 win at Vale Park, to give the "Valiants" what seemed to be an easy second round tie with Southern League side Chasetown (an eighth tier team 101 league places below them). Vale sacrificed a one-goal lead over the amateurs to limp to a 1–1 draw at Vale Park, after conceding from a 40 yards (37 m) free kick taken by trainee accountant Mark Branch. Chasetown then made a giant-killing with a late goal on their home ground, after Luke Rodgers missed two penalties.

In the League Cup, Vale exited in the first round after losing to League Two side Wrexham 5–3 on penalties, following a 1–1 home draw.

In the Football League Trophy, Vale were beaten on penalties by a League Two side for the second time in the season, this time after a 2–2 draw with Morecambe at Christie Park. Caretaker manager Dean Glover likened his side to a "pub team".

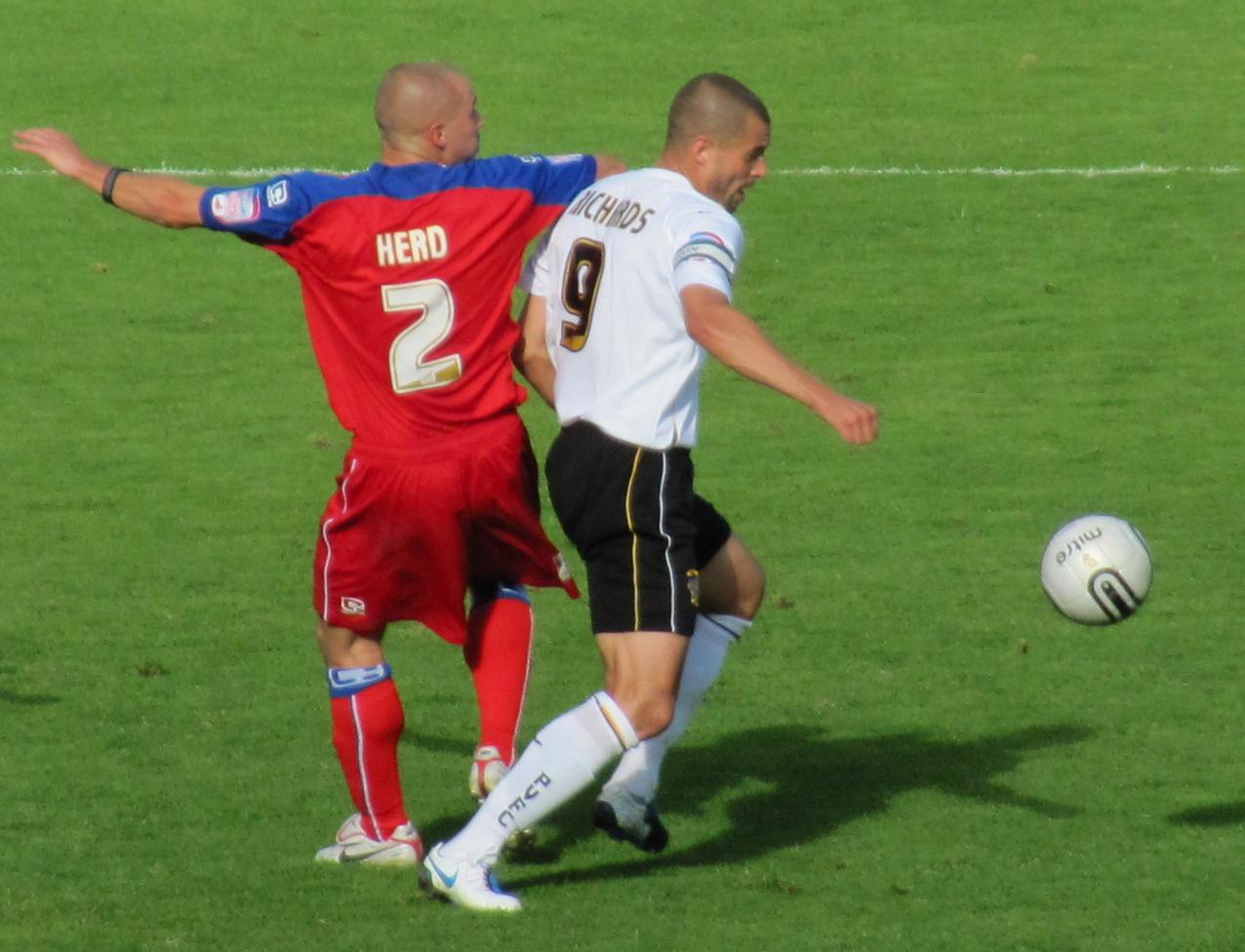
Marc Richards rejected a £100,000 move to Cheltenham Town.

== Results ==
=== Football League One ===
==== League table ====
Pos	Team	Pld	W	D	L	GF	GA	GD	Pts	Promotion, qualification or relegation
20	Crewe Alexandra	46	12	14	20	47	65	−18	50	
21	AFC Bournemouth (R)	46	17	7	22	62	72	−10	48 (Note: Bournemouth deducted 10 points for entering administration.)	Relegation to Football League Two
22	Gillingham (R)	46	11	13	22	44	73	−29	46	Relegation to Football League Two
23	Port Vale (R)	46	9	11	26	47	81	−34	38	Relegation to Football League Two
24	Luton Town (R)	46	11	10	25	43	63	−20	33 (Note: Luton deducted 10 points each for entering administration.)	Relegation to Football League Two

Updated to match(es) played on unknown. Source: The Football League
Rules for classification: 1) points; 2) goal difference; 3) number of goals scored.
(R) Relegated

==== Results by matchday ====
Round	1	2	3	4	5	6	7	8	9	10	11	12	13	14	15	16	17	18	19	20	21	22	23	24	25	26	27	28	29	30	31	32	33	34	35	36	37	38	39	40	41	42	43	44	45	46
Ground	H	A	H	A	A	H	A	H	H	A	H	A	H	A	H	A	H	A	A	H	A	H	H	A	A	H	A	H	H	A	H	A	H	A	H	A	A	H	A	H	H	A	H	A	H	A
Result	D	L	L	W	D	L	L	L	W	L	L	L	W	L	L	D	L	L	W	D	L	D	L	L	L	W	L	L	D	L	D	L	L	L	L	L	W	D	L	W	W	W	D	L	D	D
Position	7	17	22	17	14	20	22	22	21	22	23	23	22	23	23	22	23	24	21	22	23	24	24	24	24	23	23	24	24	24	24	24	24	24	24	24	24	24	24	24	24	23	23	23	23	23
Points	1	1	1	4	5	5	5	5	8	8	8	8	11	11	11	12	12	12	15	16	16	17	17	17	17	20	20	20	21	21	22	22	22	22	22	22	25	26	26	29	32	35	36	36	37	38

Source: Statto
A = Away; H = Home; W = Win; D = Draw; L = Loss

==== Matches ====
11 August 2007 1	Port Vale	1–1	Bristol Rovers	Burslem
	Rodgers 66' (pen.)	Report	Williams 77'	Stadium: Vale Park; Attendance: 6,808; Referee: Jon Moss

18 August 2007 2	Yeovil Town	1–0	Port Vale	Yeovil
	Cochrane 17'	Report		Stadium: Huish Park; Attendance: 5,071; Referee: Trevor Kettle

25 August 2007 3	Port Vale	0–2	Hartlepool United	Burslem
		Report	Robson 6'; Brown 88'	Stadium: Vale Park; Attendance: 3,978; Referee: Dean Whitestone

1 September 2007 4	AFC Bournemouth	0–1	Port Vale	Bournemouth
		Report	Rodgers 82'	Stadium: Dean Court; Attendance: 5,444; Referee: Andy D'Urso

8 September 2007 5	Walsall	0–0	Port Vale	Walsall
13:00 BST		Report		Stadium: Bescot Stadium; Attendance: 4,967; Referee: Mick Russell

15 September 2007 6	Port Vale	0–2	Nottingham Forest	Burslem
		Report	Edwards 3' (og.); Chambers 86'	Stadium: Vale Park; Attendance: 6,521; Referee: Mike Jones

22 September 2007 7	Luton Town	2–1	Port Vale	Luton
	Furlong 30'; Bell 86'	Report	Rodgers 90'	Stadium: Kenilworth Road; Attendance: 6,084; Referee: Paul Melin

29 September 2007 8	Port Vale	1–2	Southend United	Burslem
	Rodgers 59' (pen.)	Report	Clarke 32'; McCormack 45'	Stadium: Vale Park; Attendance: 3,969; Referee: Darren Drysdale

2 October 2007 9	Port Vale	3–0	Cheltenham Town	Burslem
	McGoldrick 21'; Rocastle 68'; Edwards 73'	Report		Stadium: Vale Park; Attendance: 3,102; Referee: Neil Swarbrick

6 October 2007 10	Northampton Town	2–1	Port Vale	Northampton
	Kirk 19', 33'	Report	McGoldrick 55'	Stadium: Sixfields Stadium; Attendance: 4,755; Referee: Steve Bratt

13 October 2007 11	Port Vale	0–1	Brighton & Hove Albion	Burslem
13:00 BST		Report	Revell 64'	Stadium: Vale Park; Attendance: 3,490; Referee: Mark Haywood

20 October 2007 12	Leyton Orient	3–1	Port Vale	Leyton, East London
	Mkandawire 53'; Ibehre 55'; Boyd 60' (pen.)	Report	Rodgers 40'	Stadium: Brisbane Road; Attendance: 4,555; Referee: Mike Thorpe

27 October 2007 13	Port Vale	2–1	Swindon Town	Burslem
	Rodgers 18' (pen.); Whitaker 26'	Report	Peacock 19'	Stadium: Vale Park; Attendance: 4,013; Referee: Andy Penn

3 November 2007 14	Huddersfield Town	3–1	Port Vale	Huddersfield
	Booth 3'; Wallwork 9'; Clarke 21'	Report	Rodgers 43'	Stadium: Kirklees Stadium; Attendance: 8,555; Referee: Pat Miller

6 November 2007 15	Port Vale	0–1	Crewe Alexandra	Burslem
		Report	Bennett 76'	Stadium: Vale Park; Attendance: 5,329; Referee: Richard Beeby

17 November 2007 16	Oldham Athletic	1–1	Port Vale	Oldham
	Davies 23'	Report	Willock 32'	Stadium: Boundary Park; Attendance: 5,097; Referee: Graham Laws

24 November 2007 17	Port Vale	1–3	Doncaster Rovers	Burslem
	Pilkington 10'	Report	Guy 59'; Hayter 68'; Wellens 81'	Stadium: Vale Park; Attendance: 4,581; Referee: Fred Graham

4 December 2007 18	Leeds United	3–0	Port Vale	Beeston, Leeds
	Prutton 18'; Beckford 55'; Flo 83'	Report		Stadium: Elland Road; Attendance: 20,301; Referee: Eddie Ilderton

8 December 2007 19	Gillingham	1–2	Port Vale	Gillingham, Kent
	Dickson 32'	Report	Willock 34'; King 45' (og.)	Stadium: Priestfield Stadium; Attendance: 7,001; Referee: Jarnail Singh

15 December 2007 20	Port Vale	0–0	Tranmere Rovers	Burslem
		Report		Stadium: Vale Park; Attendance: 3,604; Referee: Roger East

22 December 2007 21	Nottingham Forest	2–0	Port Vale	Nottingham
	Agogo 24'; McGugan 67'	Report		Stadium: City Ground; Attendance: 21,407; Referee: Andy D'Urso

26 December 2007 22	Port Vale	1–1	Walsall	Burslem
15:00 GMT	Laird 12'	Report	Ricketts 90'	Stadium: Vale Park; Attendance: 6,029; Referee: Phil Joslin

29 December 2007 23	Port Vale	1–2	Luton Town	Burslem
	Willock 45'	Report	Fojut 3'; Spring 90'	Stadium: Vale Park; Attendance: 4,224; Referee: Rob Shoebridge

2 January 2008 24	Cheltenham Town	1–0	Port Vale	Cheltenham
	Connor 22'	Report		Stadium: Whaddon Road; Attendance: 3,221; Referee: Danny McDermid

5 January 2008 25	Carlisle United	3–2	Port Vale	Carlisle
	Joyce 50'; Hackney 65', 69'	Report	Harsley 27'; Willock 38'	Stadium: Brunton Park; Attendance: 6,313; Referee: Mark Haywood

12 January 2008 26	Port Vale	3–1	Millwall	Burslem
	Whitaker 24'; Lowe 75', 90'	Report	Alexander 14'	Stadium: Vale Park; Attendance: 3,724; Referee: Michael Oliver

19 January 2008 27	Swansea City	2–0	Port Vale	Swansea
	Bodde 28'; Pratley 47'	Report		Stadium: Liberty Stadium; Attendance: 12,310; Referee: Steve Bratt

26 January 2008 28	Port Vale	1–3	AFC Bournemouth	Burslem
	Pilkington 49'	Report	Vokes 10'; Hollands 28'; Cooper 84'	Stadium: Vale Park; Attendance: 4,047; Referee: Mike Pike

29 January 2008 29	Port Vale	2–2	Yeovil Town	Burslem
	Eckersley 38'; Edwards 58'	Report	Dempsey 6'; Kirk 52'	Stadium: Vale Park; Attendance: 2,869; Referee: Andy Haines

2 February 2008 30	Bristol Rovers	3–2	Port Vale	Bristol
	Coles 13'; Lines 81'; Lambert 87' (pen.)	Report	Harsley 12' (pen.); Lowe 64'	Stadium: Memorial Stadium; Attendance: 6,927; Referee: Trevor Kettle

9 February 2008 31	Port Vale	1–1	Carlisle United	Burslem
	Harsley 84' (pen.)	Report	Garner 62'	Stadium: Vale Park; Attendance: 4,221; Referee: Karl Evans

12 February 2008 32	Hartlepool United	3–2	Port Vale	Hartlepool
	Barker 68', 90'; Sweeney 87'	Report	Herd 3', 15'	Stadium: Victoria Park; Attendance: 3,630; Referee: Keith Hill

16 February 2008 33	Port Vale	0–2	Swansea City	Burslem
		Report	Scotland 63' (pen.), 76'	Stadium: Vale Park; Attendance: 4,347; Referee: Ray Lee

23 February 2008 34	Millwall	3–0	Port Vale	Bermondsey, Southwark
	Grabban 18'; Laird 44'; Martin 68'	Report		Stadium: The Den; Attendance: 7,775; Referee: Carl Boyeson

1 March 2008 35	Port Vale	0–3	Oldham Athletic	Burslem
		Report	Robertson 23'; Eardley 78'; Wolfenden 90'	Stadium: Vale Park; Attendance: 3,715; Referee: Graham Horwood

8 March 2008 36	Doncaster Rovers	2–1	Port Vale	Doncaster
	Heffernan 11'; McCammon 19'	Report	Whitaker 34'	Stadium: Keepmoat Stadium; Attendance: 8,040; Referee: Eddie Ilderton

11 March 2008 37	Crewe Alexandra	0–2	Port Vale	Crewe
		Report	Harsley 57' (pen.); Rodgers 81'	Stadium: Gresty Road; Attendance: 5,229; Referee: Mike Dean

15 March 2008 38	Port Vale	3–3	Leeds United	Burslem
	Harsley 65' (pen.); Whitaker 67'; Rodgers 90'	Report	Marques 39'; Freedman 41', 86'	Stadium: Vale Park; Attendance: 7,908; Referee: Clive Penton

20 March 2008 39	Tranmere Rovers	2–0	Port Vale	Prenton
	Greenacre 68'; Thomas-Moore 88' (pen.)	Report		Stadium: Prenton Park; Attendance: 6,484; Referee: Russell Booth

24 March 2008 40	Port Vale	2–1	Gillingham	Burslem
15:00 GMT	Richards 19'; Whitaker 53'	Report	Griffiths 78'	Stadium: Vale Park; Attendance: 3,157; Referee: Trevor Kettle

29 March 2008 41	Port Vale	2–1	Leyton Orient	Burslem
	Richards 75'; Howland 90'	Report	Boyd 26' (pen.)	Stadium: Vale Park; Attendance: 3,252; Referee: Andy Hall

5 April 2008 42	Brighton & Hove Albion	2–3	Port Vale	Brighton
	Cox 26'; Murray 90'	Report	Richards 12', 19'; Whitaker 87'	Stadium: Withdean Stadium; Attendance: 7,741; Referee: Paul Armstrong

12 April 2008 43	Port Vale	0–0	Huddersfield Town	Burslem
		Report		Stadium: Vale Park; Attendance: 4,150; Referee: Kevin Wright

19 April 2008 44	Swindon Town	6–0	Port Vale	Swindon
	Peacock 16'; Easton 21'; Smith 33'; Timlin 44'; McNamee 45'; Joyce 90'	Report		Stadium: County Ground; Attendance: 7,361; Referee: Richard Beeby

26 April 2008 45	Port Vale	2–2	Northampton Town	Burslem
	Richards 30'; Glover 49'	Report	Gilligan 24'; Holt 27'	Stadium: Vale Park; Attendance: 4,556; Referee: Roger East

3 May 2008 46	Southend United	1–1	Port Vale	Southend-on-Sea
	Walker 84'	Report	Mulligan 23'	Stadium: Roots Hall; Attendance: 9,292; Referee: Andy Woolmer

=== FA Cup ===
10 November 2007 R1	Morecambe	0–2	Port Vale	Morecambe
		Report	Pilkington 6'; Willock 22'	Stadium: Christie Park; Attendance: 2,730; Referee: Clive Oliver

2 December 2007 R2	Port Vale	1–1	Chasetown	Burslem
14:00 BST	Rodgers 18'	Report	Branch 44'	Stadium: Vale Park; Attendance: 5,875; Referee: Neil Swarbrick

12 December 2007 Replay	Chasetown	1–0	Port Vale	Chasetown
	Smith 89'	Report		Stadium: Scholars Ground; Attendance: 1,986; Referee: Neil Swarbrick

=== League Cup ===
14 August 2007 R1	Port Vale	1–1 (a.e.t.) (3–5 p)	Wrexham	Burslem
	Rodgers 33' (pen.)	Report	Proctor 10'	Stadium: Vale Park; Attendance: 2,916; Referee: Carl Boyeson
	Penalties
	Rodgers (penalty scored); Richards (penalty scored); Tudor (penalty scored); Whitaker (penalty missed)		Valentine (penalty scored); Spender (penalty scored); Murtagh (penalty scored); Done (penalty scored); Llewellyn (penalty scored)

=== Football League Trophy ===
9 October 2007 R1	Morecambe	2–2 (a.e.t.) (4–2 p)	Port Vale	Morecambe
19:00 BST	Hunter 48'; Newby 61'	Report	Miller 5'; Rodgers 30'	Stadium: Christie Park; Attendance: 1,644; Referee: Dave Foster
	Penalties
	Artell (penalty scored); Newby (penalty scored); Lloyd (penalty scored); Hunter (penalty scored)		Rodgers (penalty scored); Tudor (penalty missed); Willock (penalty scored); Glover (penalty missed)

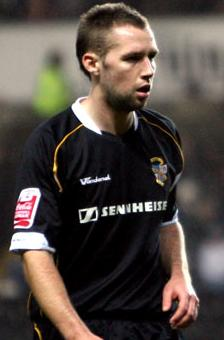
Chris Slater was signed from Chasetown.

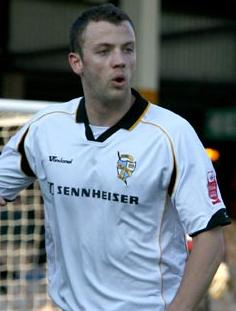
Kyle Perry was signed from Chasetown.

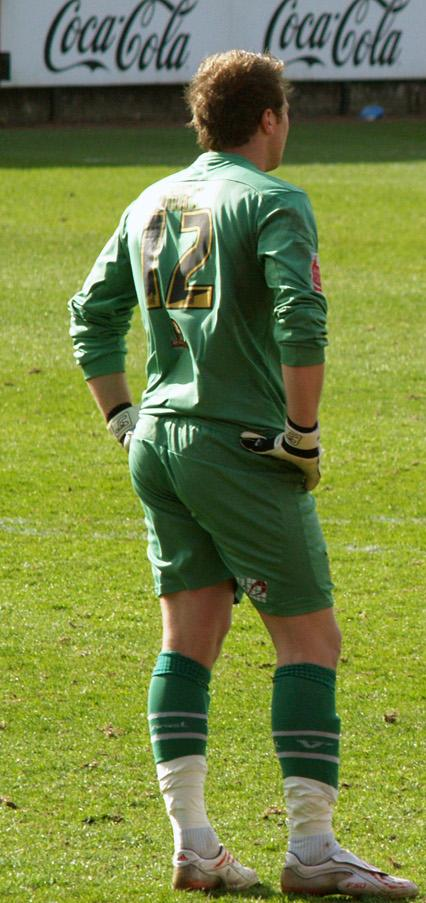
Chris Martin conceded six goals on his debut.

== Squad statistics ==
=== Appearances and goals ===
Key to positions: GK – Goalkeeper; DF – Defender; MF – Midfielder; FW – Forward

No.	Pos	Nat	Player	Total		League One		FA Cup		League Cup		Football League Trophy	
No.	Pos	Nat	Player	Apps	Goals	Apps	Goals	Apps	Goals	Apps	Goals	Apps	Goals
2	DF	(England) ENG	George Pilkington	50	3	45	2	3	1	1	0	1	0
3	DF	(England) ENG	Jason Talbot	29	0	25	0	3	0	1	0	0	0
4	MF	(England) ENG	Robin Hulbert	24	0	22	0	0	0	1	0	1	0
5	DF	(England) ENG	Keith Lowe	31	3	28	3	2	0	1	0	0	0
7	MF	(England) ENG	Shane Tudor	17	0	14	0	1	0	1	0	1	0
8	MF	(England) ENG	Paul Harsley	42	5	41	5	1	0	0	0	0	0
9	FW	(England) ENG	Marc Richards	32	5	29	5	1	0	1	0	1	0
10	FW	(England) ENG	Luke Rodgers	41	12	36	9	3	1	1	1	1	1
11	MF	(England) ENG	Paul Edwards	29	2	25	2	2	0	1	0	1	0
12	GK	(England) ENG	Joe Anyon	49	0	44	0	3	0	1	0	1	0
14	MF	(England) ENG	Danny Whitaker	45	7	41	7	3	0	1	0	0	0
15	FW	(South Africa) RSA	Justin Miller	16	1	14	0	1	0	0	0	1	1
16	MF	(England) ENG	Ross Davidson	3	0	3	0	0	0	0	0	0	0
17	MF	(Grenada) GRN	Craig Rocastle	27	1	23	1	2	0	1	0	1	0
18	DF	(England) ENG	Colin Miles	5	0	3	0	1	0	1	0	0	0
19	MF	(England) ENG	Joe Cardle	9	0	9	0	0	0	0	0	0	0
20	DF	(England) ENG	Adam Eckersley	18	1	18	1	0	0	0	0	0	0
21	FW	(England) ENG	Danny Glover	16	1	15	1	0	0	0	0	1	0
22	DF	(England) ENG	Luke Prosser	5	0	5	0	0	0	0	0	0	0
23	DF	(England) ENG	Charlie O'Loughlin	3	0	3	0	0	0	0	0	0	0
24	FW	(England) ENG	Kyle Perry	16	0	16	0	0	0	0	0	0	0
25	DF	(England) ENG	Danny Edwards	0	0	0	0	0	0	0	0	0	0
26	GK	(England) ENG	Chris Martin	2	0	2	0	0	0	0	0	0	0
27	FW	(Northern Ireland) NIR	James Lawrie	7	0	6	0	1	0	0	0	0	0
28	MF	(New Zealand) NZL	Dave Mulligan	13	1	13	1	0	0	0	0	0	0
29	DF	(England) ENG	Chris Slater	5	0	5	0	0	0	0	0	0	0
32	MF	(England) ENG	Simon Richman	6	0	6	0	0	0	0	0	0	0
34	MF	(Northern Ireland) NIR	David Howland	17	1	17	1	0	0	0	0	0	0
	MF	(England) ENG	Luke Chapman	1	0	1	0	0	0	0	0	0	0
	DF	(England) ENG	Mitchell Hanson	0	0	0	0	0	0	0	0	0	0
Players who featured but departed the club during the season:
1	GK	(England) ENG	Mark Goodlad	0	0	0	0	0	0	0	0	0	0
6	DF	(England) ENG	Richard Walker	0	0	0	0	0	0	0	0	0	0
16	DF	(England) ENG	Mark McGregor	23	0	20	0	2	0	1	0	0	0
20	FW	(England) ENG	Akpo Sodje	3	0	3	0	0	0	0	0	0	0
20	DF	(England) ENG	Ashley Westwood	14	0	12	0	1	0	0	0	1	0
24	FW	(Saint Kitts and Nevis) SKN	Calum Willock	20	4	15	3	3	1	1	0	1	0
25	FW	(Republic of Ireland) IRL	David McGoldrick	18	2	17	2	0	0	0	0	1	0
25	MF	(Australia) AUS	Chris Herd	11	2	11	2	0	0	0	0	0	0
27	MF	(England) ENG	Will Atkinson	4	0	4	0	0	0	0	0	0	0
28	MF	(Republic of Ireland) IRL	Mark Salmon	10	0	9	0	1	0	0	0	0	0
29	MF	(Scotland) SCO	Marc Laird	10	1	7	1	3	0	0	0	0	0
33	FW	(Sweden) SWE	Tobias Mikaelsson	6	0	6	0	0	0	0	0	0	0
35	DF	(Barbados) BRB	Krystian Pearce	12	0	12	0	0	0	0	0	0	0

=== Top scorers ===
Place	Position	Nation	Number	Name	EFL League One	FA Cup	EFL Cup	EFL Trophy	Total
1	FW	England	10	Luke Rodgers	9	1	1	1	12
2	MF	England	14	Danny Whitaker	7	0	0	0	7
3	MF	England	8	Paul Harsley	5	0	0	0	5
–	FW	England	9	Marc Richards	5	0	0	0	5
5	FW	Saint Kitts and Nevis	24	Calum Willock	3	1	0	0	4
6	DF	England	5	Keith Lowe	3	0	0	0	3
–	DF	England	2	George Pilkington	2	1	0	0	3
8	MF	Australia	25	Chris Herd	2	0	0	0	2
–	FW	Ireland	25	David McGoldrick	2	0	0	0	2
–	MF	England	11	Paul Edwards	2	0	0	0	2
11	DF	England	20	Adam Eckersley	1	0	0	0	1
–	MF	Grenada	17	Craig Rocastle	1	0	0	0	1
–	MF	New Zealand	28	Dave Mulligan	1	0	0	0	1
–	MF	Scotland	29	Marc Laird	1	0	0	0	1
–	MF	Northern Ireland	34	David Howland	1	0	0	0	1
–	FW	South Africa	15	Justin Miller	0	0	0	1	1
–	FW	England	21	Danny Glover	1	0	0	0	0
–	–	–	–	Own goals	1	0	0	0	1
				TOTALS	47	3	1	2	53

== Transfers ==
=== Transfers in ===
Date from	Position	Nationality	Name	From	Fee	Ref.
May 2007	DF	RSA	Justin Miller	Leyton Orient	Free transfer	
May 2007	MF	ENG	Shane Tudor	Leyton Orient	Free transfer	
June 2007	DF	ENG	Paul Edwards	Oldham Athletic	Free transfer	
June 2007	FW	ENG	Marc Richards	Barnsley	Free transfer	
June 2007	FW	GRN	Craig Rocastle	Oldham Athletic	Free transfer	
August 2007	FW	SKN	Calum Willock	Brentford	Free transfer	
January 2008	DF	ENG	Adam Eckersley	Manchester United	Free transfer	
January 2008	FW	NZ	Dave Mulligan	Scunthorpe United	Free transfer	
January 2008	FW	ENG	Kyle Perry	Chasetown	'nominal'	
January 2008	DF	ENG	Chris Slater	Chasetown	'nominal'	

=== Transfers out ===
Date from	Position	Nationality	Name	To	Fee	Ref.
August 2007	FW	ENG	Akpo Sodje	Sheffield Wednesday	Undisclosed (£300,000)	
2 January 2008	GK	ENG	Mark Goodlad	Retired		
January 2008	FW	ENG	Luke Rodgers	Yeovil Town	Mutual consent	
January 2008	DF	ENG	Richard Walker	Macclesfield Town	Released	
January 2008	FW	SKN	Calum Willock	Stevenage Borough	Released	
April 2008	DF	ENG	Adam Eckersley	(Denmark) Horsens	Free transfer	
April 2008	MF	ENG	Robin Hulbert	Darlington	Released	
April 2008	DF	ENG	Mark McGregor	Altrincham	Released	
April 2008	DF	ENG	Colin Miles	Woking	Released	
April 2008	DF	RSA	Justin Miller	Chelmsford City	Released	
April 2008	FW	NZ	Dave Mulligan	(New Zealand) Wellington Phoenix	Released	
April 2008	DF	ENG	Charlie O'Loughlin	Nantwich Town	Released	
April 2008	FW	GRN	Craig Rocastle	(Greece) Thrasyvoulos	Mutual consent	
May 2008	MF	ENG	Joe Cardle	(Scotland) Airdrie United	Released	
May 2008	MF	ENG	Paul Harsley	Chesterfield	Bosman transfer	
June 2008	MF	ENG	Danny Whitaker	Oldham Athletic	Bosman transfer	
July 2008	DF	ENG	Jason Talbot	(Scotland) Livingston	Free transfer	
August 2008	DF	ENG	George Pilkington	Luton Town	Free transfer	

=== Loans in ===
Date from	Position	Nationality	Name	From	Date to	Ref.
20 July 2007	DF	ENG	Keith Lowe	Wolverhampton Wanderers	End of season	
30 August 2007	DF	ENG	Ashley Westwood	Chester City	5 December 2007	
31 August 2007	FW	IRL	David McGoldrick	Southampton	1 January 2008	
12 October 2007	DF	ENG	Adam Eckersley	Manchester United	12 November 2007	
31 August 2007	MF	AUS	Chris Herd	Aston Villa	12 March 2008	
12 October 2007	MF	ENG	Will Atkinson	Hull City	12 November 2007	
8 November 2007	MF	SCO	Marc Laird	Manchester City	1 January 2008	
22 November 2007	MF	IRL	Mark Salmon	Wolverhampton Wanderers	6 January 2008	
17 January 2008	MF	SWE	Tobias Mikaelsson	Aston Villa	17 February 2008	
23 January 2008	MF	NIR	David Howland	Birmingham City	End of season	
31 January 2008	DF	BAR	Krystian Pearce	Birmingham City	18 April 2008	
27 March 2008	DF	ENG	Mitchell Hanson	Derby County	29 April 2008	

=== Loans out ===
Date from	Position	Nationality	Name	To	Date to	Ref.
19 November 2007	MF	ENG	Shane Tudor	Shrewsbury Town	19 December 2007	
November 2007	DF	ENG	Charlie O'Loughlin	Nantwich Town	November 2007	
2008	DF	ENG	Luke Prosser	Leigh RMI	2008	
25 November 2007	FW	ENG	Luke Rodgers	Yeovil Town	9 January 2008	
10 January 2008	FW	GRN	Craig Rocastle	Gillingham	27 January 2008	
February 2008	DF	ENG	Charlie O'Loughlin	Hinckley United	2008	
