= Luke Chapman =

English footballer

Personal information
- Date of birth: 21 March 1991 (age 35)
- Place of birth: Cannock, Staffordshire, England
- Height: 1.86 m (6 ft 1 in)
- Position: Midfielder

Youth career
- Port Vale

Senior career*
Years	Team	Apps	(Gls)
2007–2009	Port Vale	1	(0)
2009–2010	Hednesford Town	0	(0)
2010–2011	Rocester	17	(8)
2011	Stafford Rangers		
2011–201?	Sutton Coldfield Town		
- * Club domestic league appearances and goals

Luke Chapman (born 21 March 1991) is an English former footballer who played as a midfielder.

He left Port Vale in October 2009 after making one appearance for the club. Following this, he spent a brief time with Hednesford Town before joining Rocester in 2010. He signed with Stafford Rangers in the summer of 2011 before joining Sutton Coldfield Town in October 2011.

== Career ==
Chapman worked his way through the Port Vale youth team and made his first-team debut as a last minute substitute for Danny Glover in the final game of the 2007–08 season – a 1–1 draw with Southend United at Roots Hall. However, a serious knee injury meant he did not feature for the main team in the 2008–09 season.

He was transfer listed in September 2009, along with the entire Port Vale squad, after manager Micky Adams saw his team slip to a third consecutive defeat. He left the club by mutual consent the following month. He signed with Hednesford Town of the Southern Football League, making three appearances during the season, scoring once against Leamington in the Southern League Cup. In summer 2010 he signed with Rocester of the Midland Football Alliance, despite an offer from Atherstone Town. He went on to score eight goals in 17 league (and three cup) games in 2010–11.

In July 2011, he signed with Stafford Rangers of the Northern Premier League Premier Division but left in October 2011 and joined Sutton Coldfield Town. The club finished 12th in the Northern Premier League Division One South in 2011–12, and then sixth in 2012–13 and 2013–14.

== Personal life ==
Born in Cannock, Chapman attended Cannock Chase High School. He is a Walsall supporter.

== Career statistics ==
Appearances and goals by club, season and competition
Club	Season	League			FA Cup		Other		Total	
Club	Season	Division	Apps	Goals	Apps	Goals	Apps	Goals	Apps	Goals
Port Vale	2007–08	League One	1	0	0	0	0	0	1	0
Port Vale	2008–09	League One	0	0	0	0	0	0	0	0
Port Vale	2009–10	League Two	0	0	0	0	0	0	0	0
Port Vale	Total		0	0	0	0	0	0	0	0
Hednesford Town	2009–10	Southern League Premier Division	0	0	0	0	3	1	3	1
Rocester	2009–10	Midland Alliance	17	8	0	0	3	0	20	8
