= Kyle Perry =

English footballer (born 1986)

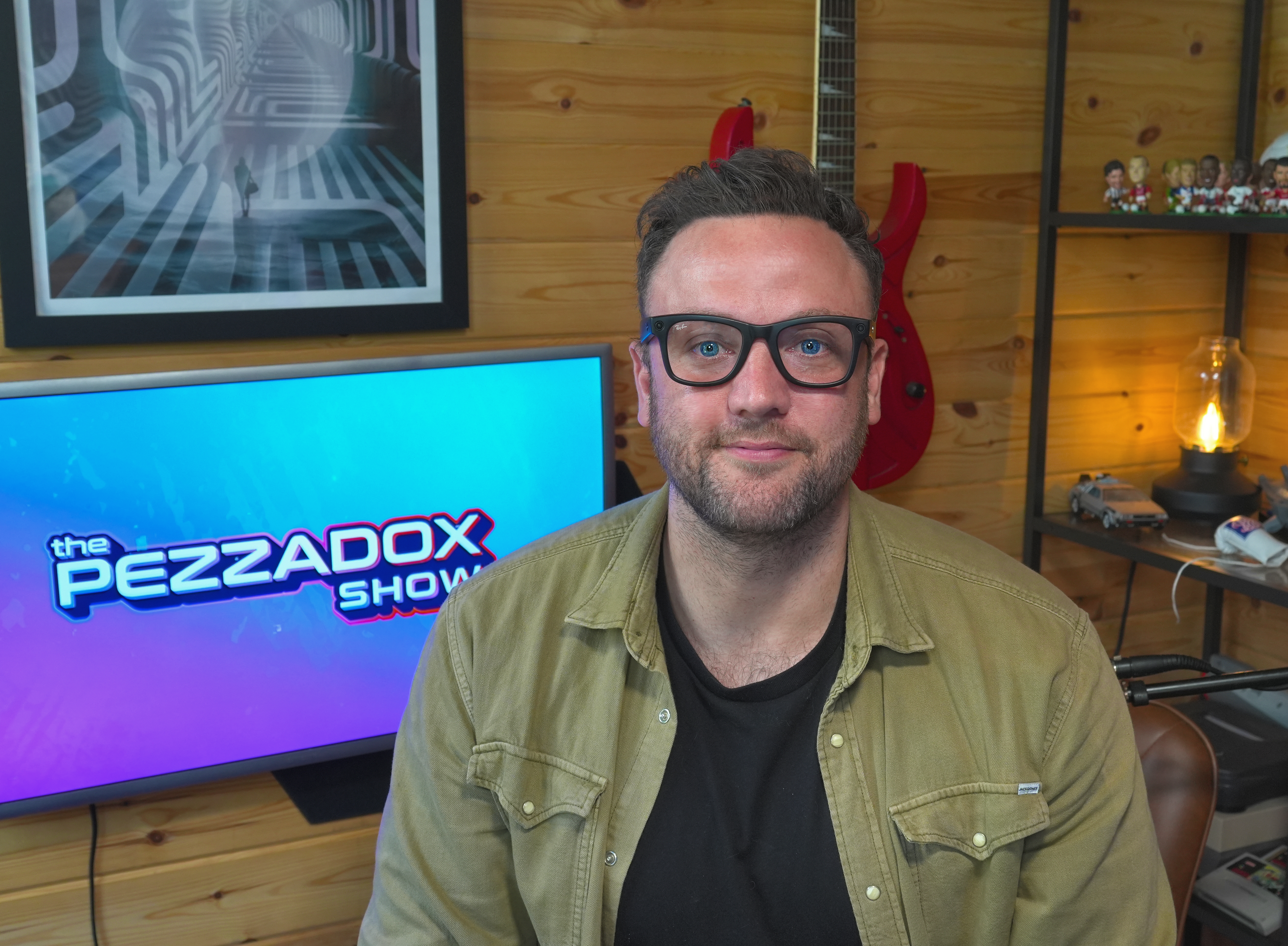
- Perry in 2026

Personal information
- Full name: Kyle Blain Perry
- Date of birth: 5 March 1986 (age 40)
- Place of birth: Birmingham, England
- Height: 6 ft 4 in (1.94 m)
- Position: Striker

Team information
- Current team: Coton Green (manager)

Youth career
- 2002–2005: Walsall

Senior career*
| Years | Team | Apps | (Gls) |
| 2004–2006 | AFC Telford United | 60 | (30) |
| 2005 | → Moor Green (loan) | | |
| 2005 | → Sutton Coldfield Town (loan) | | |
| 2006 | Hednesford Town | 1 | (0) |
| 2006–2007 | Willenhall Town | | |
| 2007–2008 | Chasetown | 11 | (7) |
| 2008–2009 | Port Vale | 31 | (0) |
| 2009 | → Northwich Victoria (loan) | 7 | (2) |
| 2009–2010 | Mansfield Town | 40 | (9) |
| 2010–2011 | Tamworth | 40 | (17) |
| 2011–2012 | Lincoln City | 24 | (3) |
| 2012 | → AFC Telford United (loan) | 19 | (1) |
| 2012–2013 | Nuneaton Town | 12 | (0) |
| 2012 | → Hereford United (loan) | 8 | (0) |
| 2013 | → Tamworth (loan) | 12 | (0) |
| 2013–2015 | Altrincham | 80 | (18) |
| 2015–2016 | Hednesford Town | 28 | (7) |
| 2016 | Worcester City | 8 | (1) |
| 2016–2017 | Stafford Rangers | | |
| 2017 | Barwell | 7 | (4) |
| 2017–2018 | Stourbridge | | |
| 2018 | Stafford Rangers | | |
| 2018–2019 | Coalville Town | 16 | (4) |
| 2019 | Bromsgrove Sporting | 6 | (3) |
| 2019–2020 | Alvechurch | 13 | (3) |
| 2020 | Stratford Town | 4 | (2) |
| 2020 | Redditch United | 0 | (0) |
| 2020–2022 | Kettering Town | 19 | (1) |
| 2022 | → Nuneaton Borough (dual) | 7 | (0) |
| 2022 | Chasetown | 7 | (1) |
| 2022–2023 | Atherstone Town | | |
| 2023 | West Didsbury & Chorlton | 2 | (0) |
| 2024–2025 | Shepshed Dynamo | 3 | (0) |
| Total | | 455 | (103) |

Managerial career
- 2026–: Coton Green (manager)
- * Club domestic league appearances and goals

Kyle Blain Perry (born 5 March 1986) is an English football manager and former professional player who manages United Counties League Premier Division South club Coton Green. A forward in his playing days, he now hosts The Pezzadox Show podcast.

Perry was in the youth system at Walsall before he dropped into non-League circles with AFC Telford United, Sutton Coldfield Town, Hednesford Town, and Willenhall Town, before impressing when non-League Chasetown knocked Port Vale out of the FA Cup. Failing to score for the Vale, he dropped down into the Conference National with Mansfield Town in June 2009. The following year, he moved on to Tamworth before signing with Lincoln in the summer of 2011. He re-joined his former club, AFC Telford United, on loan in January 2012 before signing with Nuneaton Town seven months later. He was loaned to Hereford United in October 2012. He joined Tamworth on loan in February 2013. He joined Altrincham in May 2013 and helped the club to win promotion out of the Conference North via the play-offs in 2014. He later played for Hednesford Town, Worcester City, Stafford Rangers, Barwell, Stourbridge, Coalville Town, Bromsgrove Sporting, Alvechurch, Stratford Town, Redditch United, Kettering Town, Nuneaton Borough (again), Chasetown (again), Atherstone Town, West Didsbury & Chorlton and Shepshed Dynamo. He played over 500 games in his career.

He now hosts The Pezzadox Show podcast hosting guests including comedians, cancer survivors, and sports stars. He entered management with Coton Green in October 2026.

== Playing career ==
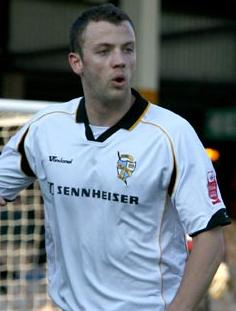
Perry playing for Port Vale in 2008

Born in Birmingham, West Midlands, Perry joined the Centre of Excellence at Walsall as an eleven-year-old and developed through the club's youth team structure to be one of seven players, including Matty Fryatt, to sign a three-year scholarship for the club in March 2002; the scholarship commencing at the start to the 2002–03 season. He later said he did not enjoy his time at the Bescot Stadium as the older youth-team players picked on him. In the third and final year of his scholarship, Perry joined up with then Northern Premier League First Division side AFC Telford United on a temporary basis, scoring twice on his debut: a 2–0 victory at Gresley Rovers on 14 September 2004 the goals being scored against his cousin Dale Belford. He continued with Telford for the remainder of the season whilst continuing to play for Walsall's reserve team, an issue that concerned Telford's then manager Bernard McNally. Having scored 23 goals for the Bucks as they secured promotion, Perry agreed to join the club permanently in July 2005.

In October 2005, he joined Sutton Coldfield Town on loan, debuting in the club's Southern League Western Division 2–0 home victory over Taunton Town on 22 October 2005. A week later he scored his first goal for the club in their 2–2 draw with Ashford Town. His final game for the club saw his score the consolation goal in a 2–1 defeat at Thame United on 5 November 2011 before he returned to AFC Telford United. He later had a brief spell on loan at Moor Green. Despite his tally of 32 goals in 68 games, he was released in July 2006. This was although the 20-year-old's goal tally had made him the top scorer in the young club's history, his record standing until 1 December 2008 when Lee Moore bagged his 33rd.

He joined Northern Premier League newcomers Hednesford Town in the summer of 2006, but only played one game for the "Pitmen" – the opening day defeat against Marine before being released by manager Phil Starbuck. He then moved to Southern League Division One Midlands side Willenhall Town on £70-a-week, where he formed a potent partnership with Matthew Barnes-Homer. Perry went on to score 26 goals for the "Reds" and was selected in the Southern Football Division One Midlands Team of the year, but was not selected to play in the play-off final defeat to Bromsgrove Rovers. After a prolific season at Noose Lane, he joined Chasetown in the summer of 2007. Another excellent return in front of goal saw him play in Chasetown's 1–0 FA Cup victory over Port Vale in December 2007. In doing this he helped Chasetown become the lowest-ever ranked club to reach as far as the third round proper of the FA Cup.

He signed for Port Vale along with Chasetown teammate Chris Slater on 11 January 2008 for a nominal fee and gave up his day job as a graphic designer. He made his debut for Port Vale as a 57th-minute substitute in a 2–0 defeat to Swansea City in January 2008. Perry later thanked Vale boss Lee Sinnott for saving his career.

In December 2008, after not appearing for Vale in three months, Perry made it clear he intended to earn a spot in the first team and brushed off rumours that he would follow Chris Slater back into non-League football. However, by February 2009, he was informed that he would not be offered a new contract in the summer. He did not score for the club, having had one goal against Morecambe initially credited to him before it was officially given to Simon Richman.

On 6 March 2009, he joined Northwich Victoria on a one-month loan. This move was extended to a two-month loan as Perry hit two goals in four games for the club. After three further games the popular striker was recalled by Vale manager Dean Glover after the club's strike force were hit with injuries. After speaking to several clubs, Perry signed for Mansfield Town on 24 June 2009 on a two-year contract.

In his first three appearances for Mansfield he scored twice against Crawley Town and once against Salisbury City, though also scored an own goal in the 4–1 defeat to Luton Town. By the end of the campaign he had netted ten goals in all competitions.

In July 2010, whilst in a middle of a two-year deal with the "Stags", Perry left the club by mutual consent to join Conference National rivals Tamworth. There he bagged 17 goals in forty games in his first and only season at the club. In July 2011, he rejected deals with Tamworth, to sign a two-year contract at fellow Conference club Lincoln City, who had lost their Football League status earlier in the year. On 5 January 2012, Perry re-joined his former team, AFC Telford, on loan until the end of the 2011–12 season. He scored just once in 19 appearances, ironically against Lincoln at Sincil Bank. In the fixture at New Bucks Head, before his loan spell, he scored twice in a 2–1 win for Lincoln. He was told he was free to leave Lincoln, and did so at the end of the season.

He signed with Nuneaton Town in July 2012, having been impressed by manager Kevin Wilkin. He joined Martin Foyle's Hereford United on a one-month loan in October 2012. Despite not starting a game for the "Bulls", his loan spell was extended into a second month. He failed to find the net in nine league and cup games at Edgar Street, though seven of his appearances were as a substitute. He returned to former club Tamworth on loan until the end of the 2012–13 season in February 2013; "Lambs" manager Dale Belford signed him due to injuries to Peter Till and Scott Barrow. He played 12 games each for both Nuneaton and Tamworth without scoring a goal in the 2012–13 season, as both clubs attained mid-table finishes.

Perry signed with Altrincham in May 2013, re-joining his former Vale manager Lee Sinnott. He scored 12 goals in 38 league games in the 2013–14 season, helping "Alty" to secure a place in the play-offs, and Perry played in the final as the club secured promotion with a 2–1 extra time victory over Guiseley. He scored eight goals in 47 appearances in the 2014–15 campaign, before being released in the summer.

Perry joined Hednesford Town of the Conference North in May 2015. In March 2016, he switched to league rivals Worcester City after what he described as an "ugly experience" at relegated Hednesford, and scored one goal and provided two assists during his eight games to keep Worcester out of the relegation zone at the end of the 2015–16 season.

He joined Stafford Rangers in August 2016, having been released by Worcester earlier in the summer. Perry was the club's top scorer as Rangers finished 13th in the Northern Premier League Premier Division at the end of the 2016–17 season. However, he found first-team football at Marston Road hard to come by early in the 2017–18 season, and switched to divisional rivals Barwell in August 2017. He moved on to Stourbridge, also of the Northern Premier League Premier Division, the following month. He returned to Stafford Rangers in February 2018. The club posted a 14th-place finish at the end of the 2017–18 season.

On 15 November 2018, Perry signed for Southern League Premier Division Central side Coalville Town. He left the club on 18 March 2019. On 25 June 2019, Perry joined Bromsgrove Sporting. He switched to Alvechurch in September 2019 as part of manager Darren Byfield's revamp of the "Church". He switched to league rivals Stratford Town in February 2020. As a result of the COVID-19 pandemic in England, the 2019–20 season was formally abandoned on 26 March, with all results from the season being expunged.

On 17 June 2020, Perry signed with Redditch United. However, he left the club in September 2020 without ever playing a first-team game for the "Reds". He joined National League North club Kettering Town two months later. Speaking in December, AFC Telford United manager Gavin Cowan warned Perry's detractors to mock the striker "at their peril" as "he's unorthodox, he has an effect, people like to ridicule unorthodox but he's continuing to play and affect games". Perry ended the 2020–21 campaign with one goal in eleven games after the season was ended early due to the ongoing pandemic. He scored one goal in eleven games in the first half of the 2020–21 campaign, and then joined Nuneaton Borough on dual registration terms on 5 January 2022. He signed with former club Chasetown on 15 March 2022. The "Chase" qualified for the play-offs in fourth-place, but were beaten 1–0 by Belper Town in the final, during which Perry made an appearance as a 75th-minute substitute. He joined Midland League Premier Division newcomers Atherstone Town in August 2022. On 13 January 2023, he signed with West Didsbury & Chorlton of the North West Counties League Premier Division. He played two games later in the month. In September 2024, Perry made his return to football, joining Shepshed Dynamo. He later worked as the assistant manager of Romulus.

== International career ==
Perry was called up to the England C team in November 2009.

== Management career ==
Perry was appointed manager of United Counties League Premier Division South club Coton Green in October 2026.

== Personal and later life ==
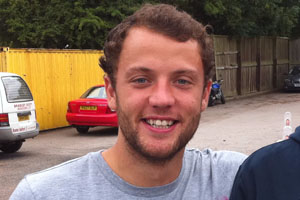
Perry in July 2010

Perry's cousin is former Tamworth goalkeeper, Dale Belford. His brother, Todd, also played non-League football and the pair were teammates at some clubs. His grandfather, William Scattergood, also played non-League football for Nuneaton Borough. He has a son. He is separated from the child's mother. He sang in a wedding band called Function Band Live and previously was in a band called StubbleMelt. Stubblemelt was a "grimy rock pop outfit" and in December 2011 they performed in the BBC Lincolnshire Introducing session studio.

In March 2021, he announced that with his brother Todd he had formed a workwear clothing firm called KyTo Apparel. He started a podcast, The Pezzadox, in 2026.

== Career statistics ==
Appearances and goals by club, season and competition
| Season | Club | League | | | FA Cup | | League Cup | | Other | | Total | |
| Season | Club | Division | Apps | Goals | Apps | Goals | Apps | Goals | Apps | Goals | Apps | Goals |
|---|---|---|---|---|---|---|---|---|---|---|---|---|
| AFC Telford United | 2004–05 | Northern Premier League; First Division | 31 | 21 | 0 | 0 | — | | 0 | 0 | 31 | 21 |
| AFC Telford United | 2005–06 | Northern Premier League; Premier Division | 29 | 9 | 0 | 0 | — | | 0 | 0 | 29 | 9 |
| AFC Telford United | Total | | 60 | 30 | 0 | 0 | 0 | 0 | 0 | 0 | 60 | 30 |
| Hednesford Town | 2006–07 | Northern Premier League; Premier Division | 1 | 0 | 0 | 0 | — | | 0 | 0 | 1 | 0 |
| Chasetown | 2007–08 | Southern League; Division One Midlands | 11 | 6 | 10 | 1 | — | | 0 | 0 | 21 | 7 |
| Port Vale | 2007–08 | League One | 16 | 0 | — | | — | | — | | 16 | 0 |
| Port Vale | 2008–09 | League Two | 15 | 0 | 0 | 0 | 1 | 0 | 1 (Note: Appearance in the EFL Trophy.) | 0 | 17 | 0 |
| Port Vale | Total | | 31 | 0 | 0 | 0 | 1 | 0 | 1 | 0 | 33 | 0 |
| Northwich Victoria (loan) | 2008–09 | Conference National | 7 | 2 | 0 | 0 | — | | 0 | 0 | 7 | 2 |
| Mansfield Town | 2009–10 | Conference National | 40 | 9 | 3 | 2 | — | | 1 (Note: Appearance(s) in the FA Trophy.) | 0 | 44 | 11 |
| Tamworth | 2010–11 | Conference National | 40 | 17 | 2 | 0 | — | | 0 | 0 | 42 | 17 |
| Lincoln City | 2011–12 | Conference National | 24 | 3 | 0 | 0 | — | | 0 | 0 | 24 | 3 |
| AFC Telford United (loan) | 2011–12 | Conference National | 19 | 1 | 0 | 0 | — | | 0 | 0 | 19 | 1 |
| Nuneaton Town | 2012–13 | Conference National | 12 | 0 | 0 | 0 | — | | 0 | 0 | 12 | 0 |
| Hereford United (loan) | 2012–13 | Conference National | 8 | 0 | 1 | 0 | — | | 0 | 0 | 9 | 0 |
| Tamworth (loan) | 2012–13 | Conference National | 12 | 0 | 0 | 0 | — | | 0 | 0 | 12 | 0 |
| Altrincham | 2013–14 | Conference North | 38 | 12 | 0 | 0 | — | | 6 | 2 | 44 | 14 |
| Altrincham | 2014–15 | Conference Premier | 42 | 6 | 2 | 2 | — | | 3 | 0 | 47 | 8 |
| Altrincham | Total | | 80 | 18 | 2 | 2 | 0 | 0 | 9 | 2 | 91 | 22 |
| Hednesford Town | 2015–16 | National League North | 28 | 7 | 0 | 0 | — | | 0 | 0 | 28 | 7 |
| Worcester City | 2015–16 | National League North | 8 | 1 | 0 | 0 | — | | 0 | 0 | 8 | 1 |
| Worcester City | 2016–17 | National League North | 0 | 0 | 0 | 0 | — | | 0 | 0 | 0 | 0 |
| Worcester City | Total | | 8 | 1 | 0 | 0 | 0 | 0 | 0 | 0 | 8 | 1 |
| Coalville Town | 2018–19 | Southern League; Premier Division Central | 16 | 4 | 0 | 0 | — | | 2 | 0 | 18 | 4 |
| Bromsgrove Sporting | 2019–20 | Southern League; Premier Division Central | 6 | 3 | 1 | 0 | — | | 0 | 0 | 7 | 3 |
| Alvechurch | 2019–20 | Southern League; Premier Division Central | 13 | 3 | 0 | 0 | — | | 3 (Note: 1 appearance in the Southern League Cup, 1 appearance in the Birmingham Senior Cup and 1 appearance in the FA Trophy.) | 1 | 16 | 4 |
| Stratford Town | 2019–20 | Southern League; Premier Division Central | 4 | 2 | 0 | 0 | — | | 0 | 0 | 4 | 2 |
| Redditch United | 2020–21 | Southern League; Premier Division Central | 0 | 0 | 0 | 0 | — | | 0 | 0 | 0 | 0 |
| Kettering Town | 2020–21 | National League North | 8 | 0 | 0 | 0 | — | | 3 | 1 | 11 | 1 |
| Kettering Town | 2021–22 | National League North | 11 | 1 | 1 | 1 | — | | 1 | 0 | 13 | 2 |
| Kettering Town | Total | | 19 | 1 | 1 | 1 | 0 | 0 | 4 | 1 | 24 | 3 |
| Nuneaton Borough | 2021–22 | Southern League; Premier Division Central | 7 | 0 | 0 | 0 | — | | 0 | 0 | 7 | 0 |
| Chasetown | 2021–22 | Northern Premier League; Division One Midlands | 7 | 0 | 0 | 0 | — | | 4 (Note: 2 appearances and 1 goal in the Walsall Senior Cup, 2 appearances in the play-offs.) | 1 | 11 | 1 |
| West Didsbury & Chorlton | 2022–23 | North West Counties League; Premier Division | 2 | 0 | 0 | 0 | — | | 0 | 0 | 2 | 0 |
| West Didsbury & Chorlton | 2023–24 | North West Counties League; Premier Division | 0 | 0 | 0 | 0 | — | | 0 | 0 | 0 | 0 |
| West Didsbury & Chorlton | Total | | 2 | 0 | 0 | 0 | 0 | 0 | 0 | 0 | 2 | 0 |
| Shepshed Dynamo | 2024–25 | Northern Premier League; Division One Midlands | 0 | 0 | 0 | 0 | — | | 0 | 0 | 0 | 0 |
| Career total | | | 455 | 107 | 20 | 6 | 1 | 0 | 24 | 5 | 500 | 118 |

== Honours ==
Individual

- Southern League Division One Midlands Team of the Year: 2006–07
- Tamworth Player of the Year: 2010–11

Altrincham

- Conference North play-offs: 2013–14
