= 2008–09 Port Vale F.C. season =

Port Vale F.C.
2008–09 season
- Owner: Valiant 2001
- Chairman: Bill Bratt
- Manager: Lee Sinnott (until 22 September); Dean Glover & Andy Porter (caretakers 22 September – 6 October); Dean Glover (from 6 October)
- Stadium: Vale Park
- Football League Two: 18th (48 points)
- FA Cup: Second round (eliminated by Macclesfield Town)
- League Cup: First round (eliminated by Sheffield United)
- Football League Trophy: First round (eliminated by Stockport County)
- Player of the Year: Joe Anyon
- Top goalscorer: League: Marc Richards (10); All: Marc Richards (11)
- Highest home attendance: 7,273 vs. Bradford City, 6 September 2008
- Lowest home attendance: 4,090 vs. Dagenham & Redbridge, 10 March 2009
- Average home league attendance: 5,522
- Biggest win: 3–0 vs. Chester City, 27 January 2009
- Biggest defeat: 1–4 and 0–3 (three games)
| Home colours | Away colours |

The 2008–09 season was Port Vale's 97th season of football in the English Football League, and first season in League Two, following their relegation from League One. The season began under manager Lee Sinnott, who was dismissed in September after a series of poor results. Dean Glover was appointed as his successor but was unable to prevent the club from finishing in 18th place with 48 points, narrowly avoiding further relegation.

In cup competitions, Vale experienced early exits. They were eliminated in the Second Round of the FA Cup by Macclesfield Town, and both the League Cup and the Football League Trophy saw them knocked out in the First Round by Sheffield United and Stockport County, respectively. Marc Richards was the club's top scorer, netting 11 goals in all competitions, with 10 in the league. Goalkeeper Joe Anyon was named Player of the Year, despite suffering a broken leg towards the end of the season. The club's highest home attendance was 7,273 against Bradford City on 6 September 2008, and the lowest was 4,090 against Dagenham & Redbridge on 10 March 2009.

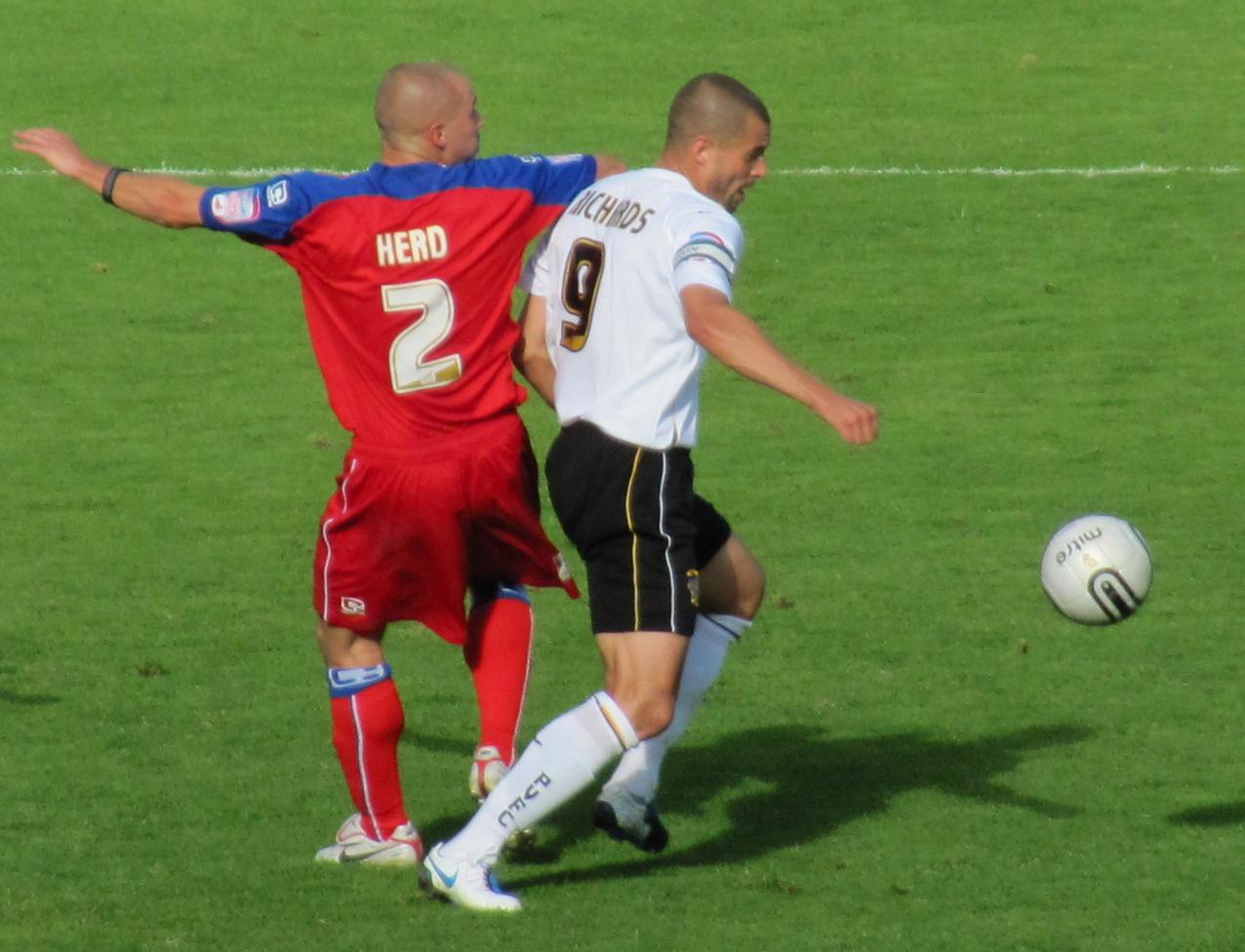
Top-scorer Marc Richards.

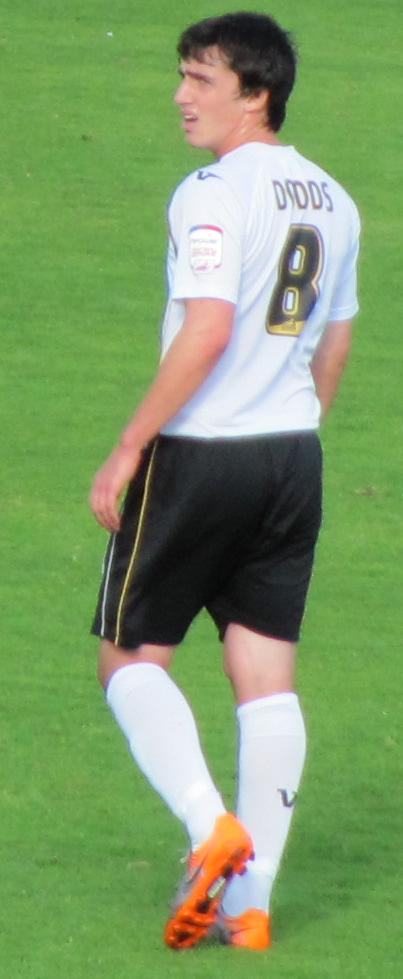
Louis Dodds hit ten goals.

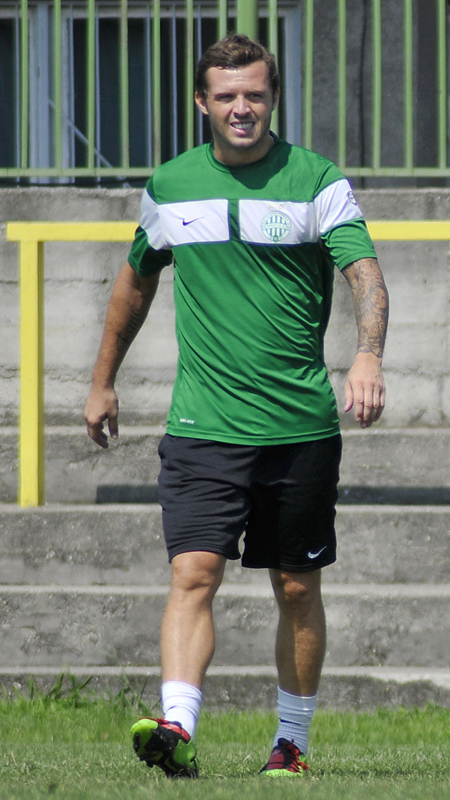
Captain Sam Stockley.

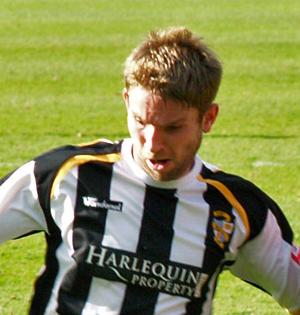
John McCombe in action against Bury in April.

== Overview ==
=== League Two ===
The pre-season saw manager Lee Sinnott sign non-League midfielder Rob Taylor, former Hereford United defender John McCombe, and former Middlesbrough midfielder Steve Thompson. Both players cited Sinnott as their reason for joining the club. He also added experienced defender Sam Stockley (Wycombe Wanderers); midfielder Anthony Griffith (Doncaster Rovers); and attacking midfielder Louis Dodds (Leicester City) to the squad. Lee Collins also joined on an extended loan from Wolverhampton Wanderers, and would sign a permanent contract with the club in January. Stockley was appointed captain, and most of these players would become key for the club over the next few seasons. Just before the season's start, teenage Tom Taiwo also arrived on a month loan from Chelsea, as did Plymouth Argyle youngster Damien McCrory. The club was aiming for an immediate return to League One, and fans got behind the club with record high season ticket sales of over 6,000.

Vale opened the season with a 3–1 win over Luton Town at Kenilworth Road, with Louis Dodds and Sam Parkin goals cancelling each other out in the first half, whilst second-half strikes from Rob Taylor and Marc Richards won the game. August went well, but all four league games in September ended in defeat. However, Sinnott refused to compromise his managerial philosophy to pick up results. Vale lost 2–0 to Bradford City on 6 September, with goals from Lee Bullock and Peter Thorne. A 4–1 home defeat to Macclesfield Town on 20 September would prove to be Sinnott's last game in charge. Sinnott was sacked on 22 September, with the Valiants in 16th place, Dean Glover taking over as caretaker manager for the second time in twelve months. The players were against the decision to axe Sinnott. Sinnott would later take court action against the club for a breach of contract, and settle out of court. Glover was appointed as manager permanently on 6 October. A win at Shrewsbury Town instigated a run of four away wins out of five. However, Vale soon returned to their poor form and slid back down the table. At the end of October, former Vale star Dave Brammer joined on loan from Millwall, and would join permanently in the January transfer window. The next month Scott Brown also arrived on loan from Cheltenham Town, and would also join on a permanent transfer two months later. This is also what happened with defender Gareth Owen, who arrived after leaving Stockport County following a bust-up with Jim Gannon. Notts County player Neil MacKenzie also joined on loan. Attempts to bring back Chris Birchall on loan failed. Leaving Burslem was Chris Slater, who returned to former club Chasetown. In December, Andy Porter left the club's backroom staff after 17 years at the club, highlighting the unrest in the camp. Both Porter and Mark Grew had turned down offers to become Glover's assistant.

In January, striker Luke Rodgers was released from his contract after a bust-up with manager Dean Glover, and immediately signed with Yeovil Town. Shane Tudor retired due to injury on 21 January. As well as the permanent signings of a number of loan players, Glover also brought in Pakistan international Adnan Ahmed on loan from Tranmere Rovers. Glover stated the club's revised aim was a top-half finish. In February, Glover signed Carlisle United striker Kevin Gall on loan. He failed to score in seven games with the club, and returned to Carlisle after picking up a calf injury. In March, Kyle Perry was allowed to join local non-League side Northwich Victoria, after being told he had no future at Vale. In his place came loanee winger Paul Marshall from Manchester City. On 21 March, Vale recorded a surprise 1–0 win over Bradford City at Valley Parade with Howland the only scorer. On 28 March, Anyon broke his leg at Saltergate in a defeat to Chesterfield. With Vale going eight games without a win, Glover admitted he was 'a dead man walking', and implored the fan's not to boo his son. Fans protested against both the board and the manager. The final game was a 2–1 win over Barnet at the Underhill Stadium.

They finished in 18th place with 48 points, 21 points short of the play-offs, and eleven points clear of relegation. Only Accrington Stanley and Chester City scored fewer than Vale's tally of 44 goals. With 14 defeats, only Macclesfield Town and Chester lost more games than Vale. Had Bournemouth and Luton Town not faced point deductions, then Vale would have finished in twentieth place. Marc Richards was the club's top scorer with eleven goals in all competitions, whilst Louis Dodds also contributed ten goals.

At the end of the season, most of the playing staff were retained. However, Scott Brown returned to Cheltenham Town, and Kyle Perry was released and signed with Mansfield Town, and Dave Brammer had to retire after Chairman Bill Bratt informed him via voicemail that he would not be offered a new contract. Youth team graduate Paul Dixon was not offered a new contract. Dean Glover, unpopular with the fans, was also informed that he would not be retained as manager for the following season, and left the club permanently after he rejected the opportunity to remain as a youth coach. A slow uptake of season ticket sales was one major factor in Glover's sacking. Following Glover's departure the club withdrew their contract offer to Paul Edwards, who went on to play for Barrow. However, Player of the Year Joe Anyon stayed at the club, despite claiming other clubs were interested in his signature.

=== Finances ===
On the financial side, poor results encouraged Vale fans to organize protests against manager Glover and the board, including Chairman Bill Bratt. With talks of fresh investment from shirt sponsors Harlequin Property came rumours on the internet that the company were planning to demolish Vale Park and build a supermarket, paying off Bratt to ensure his compliance. Bratt passionately denied these accusations, seemingly angered by the suggestion and claimed that if he were to comply with the protesters demands and remove himself and the rest of the V-2001 directors from the Board, then the club would fold as banks and creditors would seek their money. He also reiterated his prior statements by stating that he would be prepared to leave his position if the right offer were to be made. The club had to make monthly repayments of around £19,000 for a £2.25 million loan taken out from the local council in 2005. The club's shirt sponsorship came from Harlequin Property.

=== Cup competitions ===
In the FA Cup, Vale advanced past Huddersfield Town with a 4–3 win at the Galpharm Stadium, Dodds hitting a brace. They then were knocked out by Macclesfield Town at the second-round stage with a 3–1 home defeat. This meant the Vale missed out on a lucrative home tie with Premier League side Everton. Keeper Anyon slammed his defenders for their part in the defeat.

In the League Cup, Vale were defeated 3–1 by Championship club Sheffield United at Bramall Lane.

In the Football League Trophy, Vale exited in the first round with a 1–0 defeat to Stockport County at Edgeley Park.

== Results ==
=== Football League Two ===
==== League table ====
| Pos | Team | Pld | W | D | L | GF | GA | GD | Pts |
|---|---|---|---|---|---|---|---|---|---|
| 16 | Accrington Stanley | 46 | 13 | 11 | 22 | 42 | 59 | −17 | 50 |
| 17 | Barnet | 46 | 11 | 15 | 20 | 56 | 74 | −18 | 48 |
| 18 | Port Vale | 46 | 13 | 9 | 24 | 44 | 66 | −22 | 48 |
| 19 | Notts County | 46 | 11 | 14 | 21 | 49 | 69 | −20 | 47 |
| 20 | Macclesfield Town | 46 | 13 | 8 | 25 | 45 | 77 | −32 | 47 |

Source: The Football League
Rules for classification: 1) points; 2) goal difference; 3) number of goals scored.

==== Results by matchday ====
| Round | 1 | 2 | 3 | 4 | 5 | 6 | 7 | 8 | 9 | 10 | 11 | 12 | 13 | 14 | 15 | 16 | 17 | 18 | 19 | 20 | 21 | 22 | 23 | 24 | 25 | 26 | 27 | 28 | 29 | 30 | 31 | 32 | 33 | 34 | 35 | 36 | 37 | 38 | 39 | 40 | 41 | 42 | 43 | 44 | 45 | 46 |
|---|---|---|---|---|---|---|---|---|---|---|---|---|---|---|---|---|---|---|---|---|---|---|---|---|---|---|---|---|---|---|---|---|---|---|---|---|---|---|---|---|---|---|---|---|---|---|
| Ground | A | H | A | H | H | A | H | A | H | A | A | H | H | A | A | H | A | H | H | A | H | A | H | H | H | A | H | A | A | H | A | H | A | H | H | A | A | A | A | H | H | A | H | A | H | A |
| Result | W | L | D | W | L | L | L | L | L | W | W | L | W | L | W | L | L | D | W | L | L | L | W | D | L | L | W | D | L | L | W | L | D | L | W | L | W | L | L | D | D | L | D | L | D | W |
| Position | 3 | 11 | 9 | 7 | 10 | 12 | 16 | 18 | 19 | 16 | 14 | 15 | 13 | 14 | 13 | 14 | 15 | 14 | 14 | 15 | 15 | 18 | 15 | 16 | 16 | 17 | 16 | 16 | 17 | 17 | 16 | 17 | 17 | 18 | 18 | 18 | 17 | 18 | 18 | 18 | 19 | 19 | 19 | 19 | 19 | 18 |
| Points | 3 | 3 | 4 | 7 | 7 | 7 | 7 | 7 | 7 | 10 | 13 | 13 | 16 | 16 | 19 | 19 | 19 | 20 | 23 | 23 | 23 | 23 | 26 | 27 | 27 | 27 | 30 | 31 | 31 | 31 | 34 | 34 | 35 | 35 | 38 | 38 | 41 | 41 | 41 | 42 | 43 | 43 | 44 | 44 | 45 | 48 |

Source: Statto
A = Away; H = Home; W = Win; D = Draw; L = Loss

==== Matches ====
| 9 August 2008 1 | Luton Town | 1–3 | Port Vale | Luton |
| | Parkin 35' | Report | Dodds 25'; Taylor 45'; Richards 58' | Stadium: Kenilworth Road; Attendance: 7,149; Referee: Mike Thorpe |

| 16 August 2008 2 | Port Vale | 0–2 | Accrington Stanley | Burslem |
| | | Report | Craney 3'; Mullin 89' | Stadium: Vale Park; Attendance: 6,643; Referee: Graham Horwood |

| 23 August 2008 3 | Dagenham & Redbridge | 1–1 | Port Vale | Dagenham |
| | Benson 5' | Report | Richards 7' | Stadium: Victoria Road; Attendance: 1,843; Referee: Graham Scott |

| 30 August 2008 4 | Port Vale | 3–1 | AFC Bournemouth | Burslem |
| | Richards 15'; Richman 64'; McCombe 66' | Report | Lindfield 58' | Stadium: Vale Park; Attendance: 6,048; Referee: Mick Russell |

| 6 September 2008 5 | Port Vale | 0–2 | Bradford City | Burslem |
| | | Report | Bullock 17'; Thorne 76' | Stadium: Vale Park; Attendance: 7,273; Referee: Phil Gibbs |

| 13 September 2008 6 | Darlington | 2–1 | Port Vale | Darlington |
| | Burgmeier 38'; Hatch 77' | Report | Rodgers 28' | Stadium: The Darlington Arena; Attendance: 3,040; Referee: Karl Evans |

| 20 September 2008 7 | Port Vale | 1–4 | Macclesfield Town | Burslem |
| | Dodds 44' | Report | Dunfield 36'; Yeo 75' (pen.), 83'; Reid 86' | Stadium: Vale Park; Attendance: 6,645; Referee: Iain Williamson |

| 27 September 2008 8 | Gillingham | 1–0 | Port Vale | Gillingham, Kent |
| | McCombe 34' (og.) | Report | | Stadium: Priestfield Stadium; Attendance: 4,986; Referee: Andy Woolmer |

| 4 October 2008 9 | Port Vale | 1–2 | Notts County | Burslem |
| | Rodgers 48' | Report | Forrester 6'; Weston 66' | Stadium: Vale Park; Attendance: 6,247; Referee: Simon Hooper |

| 11 October 2008 10 | Shrewsbury Town | 1–2 | Port Vale | Shrewsbury |
| | Symes 89' | Report | Dodds 19'; Richards 90' | Stadium: New Meadow; Attendance: 7,162; Referee: Darren Deadman |

| 19 October 2008 11 | Chester City | 1–2 | Port Vale | Chester |
| 12:00 BST | Lowe 85' | Report | Richards 11'; Richman 78' | Stadium: Deva Stadium; Attendance: 3,102; Referee: Scott Mathieson |

| 21 October 2008 12 | Port Vale | 1–3 | Exeter City | Burslem |
| | Rodgers 86' | Report | Stewart 17'; Sercombe 18'; Gill 65' | Stadium: Vale Park; Attendance: 5,493; Referee: Jon Moss |

| 25 October 2008 13 | Port Vale | 2–1 | Morecambe | Burslem |
| | Rodgers 80'; Richards 90' | Report | Bentley 81' | Stadium: Vale Park; Attendance: 5,629; Referee: Phil Crossley |

| 28 October 2008 14 | Aldershot Town | 1–0 | Port Vale | Aldershot |
| | Soares 13' | Report | | Stadium: Recreation Ground; Attendance: 3,039; Referee: David Phillips |

| 1 November 2008 15 | Lincoln City | 0–1 | Port Vale | Lincoln |
| | | Report | Howland 26' | Stadium: Sincil Bank; Attendance: 4,793; Referee: Carl Boyeson |

| 15 November 2008 16 | Port Vale | 0–3 | Brentford | Burslem |
| | | Report | Osborne 45'; Bean 67'; MacDonald 90' | Stadium: Vale Park; Attendance: 6,058; Referee: Andy Haines |

| 22 November 2008 17 | Wycombe Wanderers | 4–2 | Port Vale | High Wycombe |
| | Harrold 23' (pen.), 82'; Zebroski 45', 65' | Report | Richards 51' (pen.); Brown 66' | Stadium: Adams Park; Attendance: 4,521; Referee: Iain Williamson |

| 25 November 2008 18 | Port Vale | 0–0 | Barnet | Burslem |
| | | Report | | Stadium: Vale Park; Attendance: 4,617; Referee: Pat Miller |

| 6 December 2008 19 | Port Vale | 2–1 | Grimsby Town | Burslem |
| | Richards 28'; Richman 88' | Report | Proudlock 85' | Stadium: Vale Park; Attendance: 5,058; Referee: Karl Evans |

| 13 December 2008 20 | Bury | 3–0 | Port Vale | Bury, Greater Manchester |
| | Futcher 2'; Hurst 11', 45' | Report | | Stadium: Gigg Lane; Attendance: 2,651; Referee: Keith Hill |

| 20 December 2008 21 | Port Vale | 0–1 | Chesterfield | Burslem |
| | | Report | Downes 54' | Stadium: Vale Park; Attendance: 5,011; Referee: Craig Pawson |

| 26 December 2008 22 | Rotherham United | 1–0 | Port Vale | Sheffield |
| | Broughton 67' | Report | | Stadium: Don Valley Stadium; Attendance: 4,350; Referee: Carl Boyeson |

| 28 December 2008 23 | Port Vale | 2–1 | Rochdale | Burslem |
| | Glover 74'; Thompson 90' | Report | Le Fondre 82' (pen.) | Stadium: Vale Park; Attendance: 5,720; Referee: Dean Whitestone |

| 17 January 2009 24 | Port Vale | 1–1 | Shrewsbury Town | Burslem |
| | Thompson 9' | Report | Walker 28' | Stadium: Vale Park; Attendance: 7,068; Referee: Trevor Kettle |

| 20 January 2009 25 | Port Vale | 1–3 | Gillingham | Burslem |
| | Richards 28' | Report | Oli 49'; Miller 69'; Jackson 72' (pen.) | Stadium: Vale Park; Attendance: 4,539; Referee: James Linington |

| 24 January 2009 26 | Notts County | 4–2 | Port Vale | Nottingham |
| | Weston 32'; Forrester 55', 65', 81' (pen.) | Report | Richman 51'; Dodds 73' | Stadium: Meadow Lane; Attendance: 4,447; Referee: Jon Moss |

| 27 January 2009 27 | Port Vale | 3–0 | Chester City | Burslem |
| | Glover 59'; Taylor 73'; Lawrie 89' | Report | | Stadium: Vale Park; Attendance: 4,448; Referee: Andy Hall |

| 31 January 2009 28 | Morecambe | 1–1 | Port Vale | Morecambe |
| | Stanley 4' | Report | Richman 43' | Stadium: Christie Park; Attendance: 1,823; Referee: Colin Webster |

| 14 February 2009 29 | Brentford | 2–0 | Port Vale | Brentford, West London |
| | Osborne 45'; MacDonald 86' | Report | | Stadium: Griffin Park; Attendance: 4,702; Referee: Steven Cook |

| 20 February 2009 30 | Port Vale | 0–1 | Lincoln City | Burslem |
| | | Report | N'Guessan 12' | Stadium: Vale Park; Attendance: 5,097; Referee: Fred Graham |

| 25 February 2009 31 | Macclesfield Town | 0–2 | Port Vale | Macclesfield |
| | | Report | Ahmed 85'; Dodds 90' | Stadium: Moss Rose; Attendance: 2,267; Referee: Mark Haywood |

| 28 February 2009 32 | Port Vale | 1–3 | Luton Town | Burslem |
| | McCombe 26' | Report | Hall 43'; Gallen 52'; Martin 63' | Stadium: Vale Park; Attendance: 5,689; Referee: Roger East |

| 7 March 2009 33 | AFC Bournemouth | 0–0 | Port Vale | Bournemouth |
| | | Report | | Stadium: Dean Court; Attendance: 5,924; Referee: Graham Horwood |

| 10 March 2009 34 | Port Vale | 0–1 | Dagenham & Redbridge | Burslem |
| | | Report | Guy 25' | Stadium: Vale Park; Attendance: 4,090; Referee: Oliver Langford |

| 14 March 2009 35 | Port Vale | 3–1 | Darlington | Burslem |
| | Dodds 45'; Taylor 51'; Richards 78' | Report | Carlton 26' | Stadium: Vale Park; Attendance: 4,860; Referee: Lee Probert |

| 17 March 2009 36 | Accrington Stanley | 2–0 | Port Vale | Accrington |
| | Procter 4'; Ryan 27' | Report | | Stadium: Crown Ground; Attendance: 1,144; Referee: Colin Webster |

| 21 March 2009 37 | Bradford City | 0–1 | Port Vale | Bradford |
| | | Report | Howland 49' | Stadium: Valley Parade; Attendance: 12,436; Referee: Steve Bratt |

| 28 March 2009 38 | Chesterfield | 2–1 | Port Vale | Chesterfield, Derbyshire |
| | Lester 68', 74' | Report | Marshall 77' | Stadium: Saltergate; Attendance: 3,511; Referee: Michael Oliver |

| 31 March 2009 39 | Exeter City | 1–0 | Port Vale | Exeter |
| | Prosser 29' (og.) | Report | | Stadium: St James Park; Attendance: 4,235; Referee: Simon Hooper |

| 4 April 2009 40 | Port Vale | 1–1 | Bury | Burslem |
| | Lawrie 57' | Report | Bennett 68' | Stadium: Vale Park; Attendance: 5,763; Referee: Paul Taylor |

| 7 April 2009 41 | Port Vale | 0–0 | Aldershot Town | Burslem |
| | | Report | | Stadium: Vale Park; Attendance: 4,140; Referee: Anthony Taylor |

| 11 April 2009 42 | Rochdale | 1–0 | Port Vale | Rochdale |
| | Buckley 36' | Report | | Stadium: Spotland Stadium; Attendance: 3,100; Referee: Andy Haines |

| 13 April 2009 43 | Port Vale | 0–0 | Rotherham United | Burslem |
| 15:00 BST | | Report | | Stadium: Vale Park; Attendance: 4,814; Referee: Richard Beeby |

| 18 April 2009 44 | Grimsby Town | 3–0 | Port Vale | Cleethorpes |
| | Conlon 4', 49'; Jarman 21' | Report | | Stadium: Blundell Park; Attendance: 6,511; Referee: Graham Scott |

| 25 April 2009 45 | Port Vale | 1–1 | Wycombe Wanderers | Burslem |
| | Collins 61' | Report | Sawyer 80' | Stadium: Vale Park; Attendance: 6,047; Referee: Phil Crossley |

| 2 May 2009 46 | Barnet | 1–2 | Port Vale | Chipping Barnet, London |
| | Hart 90' | Report | Dodds 11'; Glover 45' | Stadium: Underhill Stadium; Attendance: 2,305; Referee: Roger East |

=== FA Cup ===
| 8 November 2008 R1 | Huddersfield Town | 3–4 | Port Vale | Huddersfield |
| | Collins 45'; Craney 51'; Williams 65' | Report | Dodds 27', 85'; Howland 79'; Richards 90' | Stadium: Kirklees Stadium; Attendance: 6,942; Referee: Graham Salisbury |

| 28 November 2008 R2 | Port Vale | 1–3 | Macclesfield Town | Burslem |
| | Dodds 71' | Report | Green 9', 73'; Gritton 90' | Stadium: Vale Park; Attendance: 4,684; Referee: Jon Moss |

=== League Cup ===
| 13 August 2008 R1 | Sheffield United | 3–1 | Port Vale | Sheffield |
| | Hendrie 41'; Quinn 71'; Webber 90' (pen.) | Report | Rodgers 53' | Stadium: Bramall Lane; Attendance: 7,694; Referee: Kevin Friend |

=== Football League Trophy ===
| 2 September 2008 R1 | Stockport County | 1–0 | Port Vale | Stockport |
| 19:15 GMT | McSweeney 4' | Report | | Stadium: Edgeley Park; Attendance: 2,290; Referee: Clive Oliver |

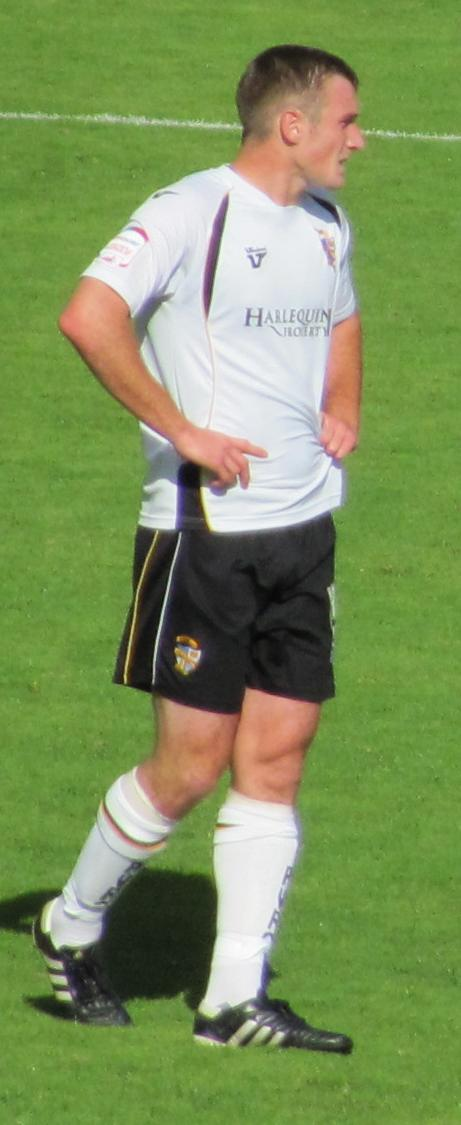
New signing Lee Collins.

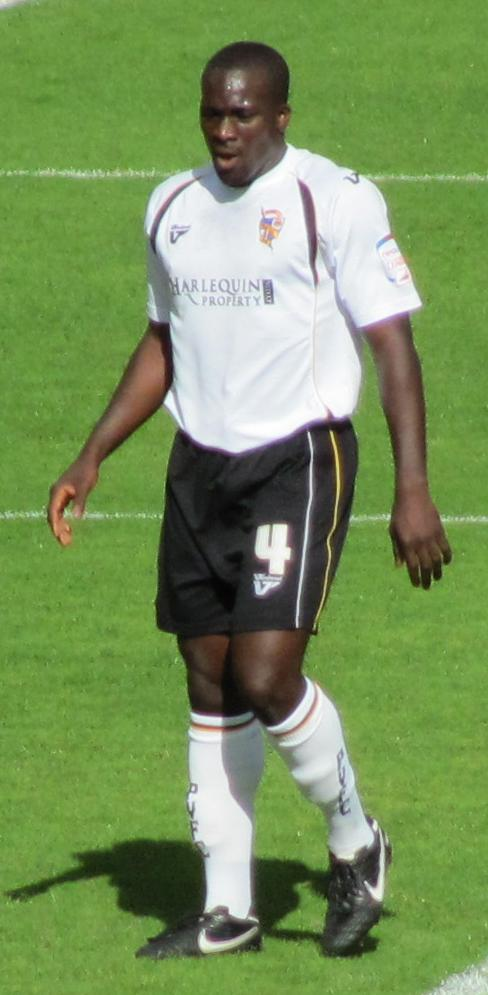
Anthony Griffith quickly established himself in the first team.

== Squad statistics ==
=== Appearances and goals ===
Key to positions: GK – Goalkeeper; DF – Defender; MF – Midfielder; FW – Forward

| No. | Pos | Nat | Player | Total | | League Two | | FA Cup | | League Cup | | Football League Trophy | |
| No. | Pos | Nat | Player | Apps | Goals | Apps | Goals | Apps | Goals | Apps | Goals | Apps | Goals |
|---|---|---|---|---|---|---|---|---|---|---|---|---|---|
| 1 | GK | (England) ENG | Joe Anyon | 39 | 0 | 36 | 0 | 2 | 0 | 1 | 0 | 0 | 0 |
| 2 | DF | (England) ENG | Sam Stockley | 25 | 0 | 22 | 0 | 1 | 0 | 1 | 0 | 1 | 0 |
| 3 | MF | (England) ENG | Rob Taylor | 22 | 3 | 20 | 3 | 0 | 0 | 1 | 0 | 1 | 0 |
| 4 | MF | (Montserrat) MSR | Anthony Griffith | 42 | 0 | 38 | 0 | 2 | 0 | 1 | 0 | 1 | 0 |
| 5 | DF | (England) ENG | John McCombe | 34 | 2 | 31 | 2 | 1 | 0 | 1 | 0 | 1 | 0 |
| 6 | DF | (England) ENG | Luke Prosser | 28 | 0 | 26 | 0 | 1 | 0 | 0 | 0 | 1 | 0 |
| 7 | FW | (England) ENG | Anthony Malbon | 1 | 0 | 1 | 0 | 0 | 0 | 0 | 0 | 0 | 0 |
| 8 | MF | (Northern Ireland) NIR | David Howland | 41 | 3 | 40 | 2 | 1 | 1 | 0 | 0 | 0 | 0 |
| 9 | FW | (England) ENG | Marc Richards | 34 | 11 | 30 | 10 | 2 | 1 | 1 | 0 | 1 | 0 |
| 10 | MF | (England) ENG | Paul Marshall | 13 | 1 | 13 | 1 | 0 | 0 | 0 | 0 | 0 | 0 |
| 11 | MF | (England) ENG | Paul Edwards | 33 | 0 | 31 | 0 | 2 | 0 | 0 | 0 | 0 | 0 |
| 12 | GK | (England) ENG | Chris Martin | 12 | 0 | 11 | 0 | 0 | 0 | 0 | 0 | 1 | 0 |
| 14 | MF | (England) ENG | Louis Dodds | 48 | 10 | 44 | 7 | 2 | 3 | 1 | 0 | 1 | 0 |
| 15 | MF | (England) ENG | Scott Brown | 19 | 1 | 18 | 1 | 1 | 0 | 0 | 0 | 0 | 0 |
| 16 | FW | (England) ENG | Kyle Perry | 17 | 0 | 15 | 0 | 0 | 0 | 1 | 0 | 1 | 0 |
| 17 | FW | (England) ENG | Steve Thompson | 17 | 2 | 17 | 2 | 0 | 0 | 0 | 0 | 0 | 0 |
| 18 | FW | (England) ENG | Danny Glover | 26 | 3 | 23 | 3 | 2 | 0 | 0 | 0 | 1 | 0 |
| 19 | MF | (England) ENG | Simon Richman | 41 | 5 | 37 | 5 | 2 | 0 | 1 | 0 | 1 | 0 |
| 20 | MF | (England) ENG | Ross Davidson | 25 | 0 | 23 | 0 | 1 | 0 | 1 | 0 | 0 | 0 |
| 21 | FW | (Northern Ireland) NIR | James Lawrie | 19 | 2 | 18 | 2 | 1 | 0 | 0 | 0 | 0 | 0 |
| 22 | DF | (England) ENG | Danny Edwards | 0 | 0 | 0 | 0 | 0 | 0 | 0 | 0 | 0 | 0 |
| 23 | MF | (England) ENG | Luke Chapman | 0 | 0 | 0 | 0 | 0 | 0 | 0 | 0 | 0 | 0 |
| 24 | DF | (England) ENG | Lee Collins | 42 | 1 | 39 | 1 | 2 | 0 | 1 | 0 | 0 | 0 |
| 25 | MF | (Pakistan) PAK | Adnan Ahmed | 5 | 1 | 5 | 1 | 0 | 0 | 0 | 0 | 0 | 0 |
| 26 | MF | (England) ENG | Dave Brammer | 14 | 0 | 13 | 0 | 1 | 0 | 0 | 0 | 0 | 0 |
| 27 | DF | (Wales) WAL | Gareth Owen | 13 | 0 | 12 | 0 | 1 | 0 | 0 | 0 | 0 | 0 |
| 29 | MF | (England) ENG | Paul Dixon | 0 | 0 | 0 | 0 | 0 | 0 | 0 | 0 | 0 | 0 |
| 32 | GK | (England) ENG | Daniel Lloyd-Weston | 0 | 0 | 0 | 0 | 0 | 0 | 0 | 0 | 0 | 0 |
Players who featured but departed the club during the season:
| 7 | MF | (England) ENG | Shane Tudor | 6 | 0 | 5 | 0 | 0 | 0 | 1 | 0 | 0 | 0 |
| 7 | FW | (England) ENG | Kevin Gall | 7 | 0 | 7 | 0 | 0 | 0 | 0 | 0 | 0 | 0 |
| 10 | FW | (England) ENG | Luke Rodgers | 17 | 5 | 15 | 4 | 0 | 0 | 1 | 1 | 1 | 0 |
| 15 | DF | (England) ENG | Chris Slater | 8 | 0 | 6 | 0 | 0 | 0 | 1 | 0 | 1 | 0 |
| 25 | MF | (England) ENG | Tom Taiwo | 5 | 0 | 4 | 0 | 0 | 0 | 0 | 0 | 1 | 0 |
| 25 | MF | (Republic of Ireland) IRL | Damien McCrory | 14 | 0 | 12 | 0 | 2 | 0 | 0 | 0 | 0 | 0 |
| 28 | MF | (England) ENG | Neil MacKenzie | 3 | 0 | 2 | 0 | 1 | 0 | 0 | 0 | 0 | 0 |

=== Top scorers ===
| Place | Position | Nation | Number | Name | EFL League Two | FA Cup | EFL Cup | EFL Trophy | Total |
|---|---|---|---|---|---|---|---|---|---|
| 1 | FW | England | 9 | Marc Richards | 10 | 1 | 0 | 0 | 11 |
| 2 | MF | England | 14 | Louis Dodds | 7 | 3 | 0 | 0 | 10 |
| 3 | MF | England | 19 | Simon Richman | 5 | 0 | 0 | 0 | 5 |
| – | FW | England | 10 | Luke Rodgers | 4 | 0 | 1 | 0 | 5 |
| 5 | FW | England | 18 | Danny Glover | 3 | 0 | 0 | 0 | 3 |
| – | MF | England | 3 | Rob Taylor | 3 | 0 | 0 | 0 | 3 |
| – | MF | Northern Ireland | 8 | David Howland | 2 | 1 | 0 | 0 | 3 |
| 8 | FW | Northern Ireland | 21 | James Lawrie | 2 | 0 | 0 | 0 | 2 |
| – | FW | England | 17 | Steve Thompson | 2 | 0 | 0 | 0 | 2 |
| – | DF | England | 5 | John McCombe | 2 | 0 | 0 | 0 | 2 |
| 11 | DF | England | 24 | Lee Collins | 1 | 0 | 0 | 0 | 1 |
| – | MF | Pakistan | 25 | Adnan Ahmed | 1 | 0 | 0 | 0 | 1 |
| – | MF | England | 10 | Paul Marshall | 1 | 0 | 0 | 0 | 1 |
| – | MF | England | 15 | Scott Brown | 1 | 0 | 0 | 0 | 1 |
| | | | | TOTALS | 44 | 5 | 1 | 0 | 50 |

=== Disciplinary record ===
| Number | Nation | Position | Name | League One | | FA Cup | | EFL Cup | | EFL Trophy | | Total | |
| Number | Nation | Position | Name | Yellow card | Red card | Yellow card | Red card | Yellow card | Red card | Yellow card | Red card | Yellow card | Red card |
| 2 | England | DF | Sam Stockley | 5 | 1 | 0 | 0 | 0 | 0 | 0 | 0 | 5 | 1 |
| 24 | England | DF | Lee Collins | 4 | 1 | 0 | 0 | 0 | 0 | 0 | 0 | 4 | 1 |
| 9 | England | FW | Marc Richards | 4 | 1 | 0 | 0 | 0 | 0 | 0 | 0 | 4 | 1 |
| 18 | England | FW | Danny Glover | 3 | 1 | 0 | 0 | 0 | 0 | 0 | 0 | 3 | 1 |
| 20 | England | MF | Ross Davidson | 2 | 1 | 0 | 0 | 0 | 0 | 0 | 0 | 2 | 1 |
| 16 | England | FW | Kyle Perry | 0 | 1 | 0 | 0 | 0 | 0 | 0 | 0 | 0 | 1 |
| 6 | England | DF | Luke Prosser | 9 | 0 | 0 | 0 | 0 | 0 | 0 | 0 | 9 | 0 |
| 8 | Northern Ireland | MF | David Howland | 6 | 0 | 0 | 0 | 0 | 0 | 0 | 0 | 6 | 0 |
| 11 | England | MF | Paul Edwards | 5 | 0 | 0 | 0 | 0 | 0 | 0 | 0 | 5 | 0 |
| 4 | Montserrat | MF | Anthony Griffith | 5 | 0 | 0 | 0 | 0 | 0 | 0 | 0 | 5 | 0 |
| 14 | England | MF | Louis Dodds | 4 | 0 | 0 | 0 | 0 | 0 | 0 | 0 | 4 | 0 |
| 5 | England | DF | John McCombe | 4 | 0 | 0 | 0 | 0 | 0 | 0 | 0 | 4 | 0 |
| 25 | Pakistan | MF | Adnan Ahmed | 3 | 0 | 0 | 0 | 0 | 0 | 0 | 0 | 3 | 0 |
| 24 | England | DF | Danny Edwards | 2 | 0 | 0 | 0 | 0 | 0 | 0 | 0 | 2 | 0 |
| 19 | England | MF | Simon Richman | 2 | 0 | 0 | 0 | 0 | 0 | 0 | 0 | 2 | 0 |
| 3 | England | MF | Rob Taylor | 2 | 0 | 0 | 0 | 0 | 0 | 0 | 0 | 2 | 0 |
| 1 | England | GK | Joe Anyon | 1 | 0 | 0 | 0 | 0 | 0 | 0 | 0 | 1 | 0 |
| 26 | England | MF | Dave Brammer | 1 | 0 | 0 | 0 | 0 | 0 | 0 | 0 | 1 | 0 |
| 10 | England | MF | Paul Marshall | 1 | 0 | 0 | 0 | 0 | 0 | 0 | 0 | 1 | 0 |
| 27 | England | DF | Gareth Owen | 1 | 0 | 0 | 0 | 0 | 0 | 0 | 0 | 1 | 0 |
| | | | TOTALS | 64 | 6 | 0 | 0 | 0 | 0 | 0 | 0 | 64 | 6 |

Sourced from Soccerway.

== Transfers ==
=== Transfers in ===
| Date from | Position | Nationality | Name | From | Fee | Ref. |
|---|---|---|---|---|---|---|
| April 2008 | MF | MNT | Anthony Griffith | Doncaster Rovers | Free transfer | |
| April 2008 | MF | ENG | Rob Taylor | Nuneaton Borough | Free transfer | |
| May 2008 | MF | NIR | David Howland | Birmingham City | Free transfer | |
| May 2008 | DF | ENG | John McCombe | Hereford United | Free transfer | |
| May 2008 | DF | ENG | Sam Stockley | Wycombe Wanderers | Free transfer | |
| May 2008 | FW | ENG | Steve Thompson | Middlesbrough | Free transfer | |
| August 2008 | FW | ENG | Louis Dodds | Leicester City | Free transfer | |
| January 2009 | MF | ENG | Dave Brammer | Millwall | Free transfer | |
| January 2009 | MF | ENG | Scott Brown | Cheltenham Town | Free transfer | |
| January 2009 | DF | ENG | Lee Collins | Wolverhampton Wanderers | Free transfer | |
| January 2009 | DF | WAL | Gareth Owen | Stockport County | Free transfer | |

=== Transfers out ===
| Date from | Position | Nationality | Name | To | Fee | Ref. |
|---|---|---|---|---|---|---|
| November 2008 | DF | ENG | Chris Slater | Chasetown | Released | |
| January 2009 | MF | ENG | Shane Tudor | Retired | | |
| 15 January 2009 | FW | ENG | Luke Rodgers | Yeovil Town | Contract terminated | |
| 1 June 2009 | MF | ENG | Dave Brammer | | Released | |
| June 2009 | DF | ENG | Paul Edwards | Barrow | Released | |
| June 2009 | FW | ENG | Kyle Perry | Mansfield Town | Free transfer | |

=== Loans in ===
| Date from | Position | Nationality | Name | From | Date to | Ref. |
|---|---|---|---|---|---|---|
| 31 July 2008 | DF | ENG | Lee Collins | Wolverhampton Wanderers | 15 January 2009 | |
| 29 August 2008 | MF | ENG | Tom Taiwo | Chelsea | 29 September 2008 | |
| 8 October 2008 | DF | IRL | Damien McCrory | Plymouth Argyle | 29 December 2008 | |
| 31 October 2008 | MF | ENG | Dave Brammer | Millwall | 1 January 2009 | |
| 21 November 2008 | MF | ENG | Scott Brown | Cheltenham Town | 2 January 2009 | |
| 25 November 2008 | DF | WAL | Gareth Owen | Stockport County | 18 January 2009 | |
| 27 November 2008 | MF | ENG | Neil MacKenzie | Notts County | 27 December 2009 | |
| 29 January 2009 | MF | PAK | Adnan Ahmed | Tranmere Rovers | End of season | |
| 24 February 2009 | FW | WAL | Kevin Gall | Carlisle United | 26 March 2009 | |
| 6 March 2009 | MF | ENG | Paul Marshall | Manchester City | End of season | |

=== Loans out ===
| Date from | Position | Nationality | Name | To | Date to | Ref. |
|---|---|---|---|---|---|---|
| 25 November 2008 | FW | ENG | Luke Rodgers | Yeovil Town | 9 January 2009 | |
| 6 March 2009 | FW | ENG | Kyle Perry | Northwich Victoria | 6 April 2009 | |
