= Justin Miller (soccer) =

South African footballer (born 1980)

Personal information
- Full name: Justin James Miller
- Date of birth: 16 December 1980 (age 45)
- Place of birth: Johannesburg, South Africa
- Height: 6 ft 0 in (1.83 m)
- Position: Central defender

Youth career
- Ipswich Town

Senior career*
| Years | Team | Apps | (Gls) |
| 2000–2003 | Ipswich Town | 0 | (0) |
| 2002 | → Leyton Orient (loan) | 13 | (0) |
| 2003–2007 | Leyton Orient | 147 | (5) |
| 2007–2008 | Port Vale | 14 | (0) |
| 2008–2009 | Chelmsford City | 21 | (0) |
| 2009–2010 | Bidvest Wits | 14 | (1) |
| 2010–2011 | Rushden & Diamonds | 32 | (3) |
| 2011–2013 | Chelmsford City | 64 | (4) |
| 2014 | Chelmsford City | 11 | (0) |
| 2014–2016 | Bury Town | 48 | (8) |
| Total | | 365 | (21) |
- * Club domestic league appearances and goals

Justin James Miller (born 16 December 1980) is a South African former footballer who played as a central defender in England.

He started his career in England with Ipswich Town in 2000 but moved on to Leyton Orient three years later without playing a competitive game for Ipswich. In four years with Orient, he made 150 league games before he switched to Port Vale for the 2007–08 campaign. He spent the next season with non-league Chelmsford City before returning to his native South Africa to play for Wits University. He returned to England in 2010 to spend a season with Conference side Rushden & Diamonds before returning to Chelmsford City the following year. He spent two years with Chelmsford and was released for a few months before he re-signed again in January 2014. He joined Bury Town later in the year and stayed at the club until 2016.

== Career ==
Miller started his professional career at Ipswich Town but was let go at the end of the 2002–03 season without making a first-team appearance. He signed with Third Division side Leyton Orient, who he had previously been loaned out to. In the 2004–05 campaign, he racked up a total of 47 appearances in all competitions, and then in the following season hit a total of 43 appearances. In his four years with the club, he racked up 150 league appearances before being released in May 2007.

He moved to Martin Foyle's Port Vale ahead of the 2007–08 season on a two-year contract from Leyton Orient, along with fellow Orient player Shane Tudor. He only lasted one season with the club, scoring once against Morecambe in the Football League Trophy, before falling out of favour with new boss Lee Sinnott.

In July 2008, he signed for non-league Chelmsford City, following an unsuccessful trial period at Aldershot Town. However, in January 2009 Miller moved back to South Africa for family reasons. He signed for Johannesburg club Bidvest Wits.

Miller joined Conference National club Rushden & Diamonds in June 2010. He made 37 appearances in all competitions, though the club suffered a crisis in summer 2011 and were expelled from the Conference.

In July 2011, he re-signed with Chelmsford City on a part-time basis, back in the Conference South. The club finished one place and four points outside the play-offs in 2011–12, before securing a play-off spot in 2012–13. He was released by manager Dean Holdsworth for "financial reasons" in the summer of 2013 but was re-signed by Chelmsford for a third time in January 2014. He helped the "Clarets" to a 17th-place finish in 2013–14.

He spent the 2014–15 season with Bury Town, as the Blues were relegated out of the Isthmian League Premier Division in last place. Bury Town finished 13th in Isthmian League Division One North in 2015–16.

== Career statistics ==
Appearances and goals by club, season and competition
| Club | Season | League | | | FA Cup | | League Cup | | Other | | Total | |
| Club | Season | Division | Apps | Goals | Apps | Goals | Apps | Goals | Apps | Goals | Apps | Goals |
|---|---|---|---|---|---|---|---|---|---|---|---|---|
| Ipswich Town | 2000–01 | Premier League | 0 | 0 | 0 | 0 | 0 | 0 | — | | 0 | 0 |
| Ipswich Town | 2001–02 | Premier League | 0 | 0 | 0 | 0 | 0 | 0 | 0 | 0 | 0 | 0 |
| Ipswich Town | 2002–03 | First Division | 0 | 0 | 0 | 0 | 0 | 0 | 0 | 0 | 0 | 0 |
| Ipswich Town | Total | | 0 | 0 | 0 | 0 | 0 | 0 | 0 | 0 | 0 | 0 |
| Leyton Orient | 2002–03 | Third Division | 19 | 0 | 2 | 0 | 1 | 0 | 2 (Note: Appearance(s) in the Football League Trophy.) | 0 | 24 | 0 |
| Leyton Orient | 2003–04 | Third Division | 34 | 2 | 2 | 0 | 1 | 0 | 0 | 0 | 37 | 2 |
| Leyton Orient | 2004–05 | League Two | 43 | 0 | 1 | 0 | 1 | 0 | 2 | 1 | 47 | 1 |
| Leyton Orient | 2005–06 | League Two | 34 | 1 | 5 | 0 | 1 | 0 | 1 | 0 | 41 | 1 |
| Leyton Orient | 2006–07 | League One | 31 | 2 | 2 | 1 | 1 | 0 | 1 | 0 | 35 | 3 |
| Leyton Orient | Total | | 161 | 5 | 12 | 1 | 5 | 0 | 6 | 1 | 184 | 7 |
| Port Vale | 2007–08 | League One | 14 | 0 | 1 | 0 | 0 | 0 | 1 | 1 | 16 | 1 |
| Chelmsford City | 2008–09 | Conference South | 21 | 0 | 0 | 0 | — | | 0 | 0 | 21 | 0 |
| Bidvest Wits | 2009–10 | Premier Soccer League | 14 | 1 | 0 | 0 | — | | 0 | 0 | 14 | 1 |
| Rushden & Diamonds | 2010–11 | Conference | 32 | 3 | 2 | 0 | — | | 3 (Note: 1 appearance in the FA Trophy and 1 appearance in the Northamptonshire Senior Cup.) | 0 | 37 | 3 |
| Chelmsford City | 2011–12 | Conference South | 23 | 1 | 4 | 1 | — | | 1 | 0 | 28 | 2 |
| Chelmsford City | 2012–13 | Conference South | 37 | 3 | 4 | 0 | — | | 3 | 0 | 44 | 3 |
| Chelmsford City | 2013–14 | Conference South | 15 | 0 | 0 | 0 | — | | 0 | 0 | 15 | 0 |
| Chelmsford City | 2014–15 | Conference South | 0 | 0 | 0 | 0 | — | | 0 | 0 | 0 | 0 |
| Chelmsford City | Total | | 75 | 4 | 8 | 1 | 0 | 0 | 4 | 0 | 87 | 5 |
| Bury Town | 2014–15 | Isthmian League; Premier Division | 31 | 4 | 1 | 0 | — | | 1 | 0 | 33 | 4 |
| Bury Town | 2015–16 | Isthmian League; Division One North | 17 | 4 | 3 | 2 | — | | 2 | 0 | 22 | 6 |
| Bury Town | Total | | 48 | 8 | 4 | 2 | 0 | 0 | 3 | 0 | 55 | 10 |
| Career total | | | 365 | 21 | 27 | 4 | 5 | 0 | 17 | 2 | 414 | 27 |
