= Chris Slater =

English footballer (born 1984)

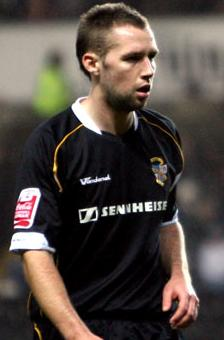
- Slater in Port Vale's away shirt, 2008

Personal information
- Full name: Christopher James Slater
- Date of birth: 14 January 1984 (age 42)
- Place of birth: Staffordshire, England
- Height: 1.83 m (6 ft 0 in)
- Position: Defender

Youth career
- 2002–2005: Wolverhampton Wanderers

Senior career*
| Years | Team | Apps | (Gls) |
| 2005–2008 | Chasetown | | |
| 2008 | Port Vale | 11 | (0) |
| 2008–2017 | Chasetown | | |
| 2017–2020 | Walsall Wood | | |
| 2020–2024 | Chasetown | | |
- * Club domestic league appearances and goals

Christopher James Slater (born 14 January 1984) is an English former professional footballer who played as a defender.

Slater had given up on becoming a professional footballer in 2005 after being released by Wolverhampton Wanderers. He joined non-League Chasetown, where he won the Midland Football Alliance title in 2005–06. However, after victory over Port Vale in the FA Cup in December 2007, he turned professional at Vale Park. He spent eleven months in the English Football League before returning to Chasetown. He helped the club to win promotion in 2010 and went on to beat the club's all-time appearance record. He joined Walsall Wood in June 2017 and helped the club to win the Midland League Division One title during the 2017–18 season. He returned to Chasetown as a player-coach for the 2020–21 season.

== Career ==
=== Chasetown ===
Released from Wolverhampton Wanderers in 2005 without a first-team appearance to his name, Slater joined non-League Chasetown. Helping the "Chase" take Oldham Athletic to a replay at Boundary Park in the first round of the FA Cup in November 2005 was just the beginning of Slater's and Chasetown's cup adventures. By April 2006, he had won a trial with Tranmere Rovers and was also being looked at by Blackpool and Crewe Alexandra, all English Football League clubs. He helped Chasetown to win the Midland Football Alliance title at the end of the 2005–06 season. He was at The Scholar Ground for the first season of the new Southern League Division One Midlands tier (2006–07). He came to prominence when playing in Chasetown's 1–0 FA Cup victory over League One Port Vale in December 2007. In doing this, he helped Chasetown become the lowest-ever ranked club to reach as far as the third round (proper) of the FA Cup. Vale was the eighth club Chasetown had vanquished in their campaign that season. He had played 146 league games for the "Scholars" in his three years at the club, scoring one goal.

=== Port Vale ===
He was signed by Lee Sinnott's Port Vale, along with Chasetown teammate Kyle Perry, in January 2008 for a nominal fee and gave up his day job as a block paver. He made his League One debut as a 70th minute substitute in a 2–0 defeat to Swansea City on 19 January 2008. He played four further league games that season, all of them defeats as the Vale were relegated into League Two. After appearing in six league and two cup games for the "Valiants" in 2008–09, Slater was released from his contract in mid-November, and subsequently re-joined Chasetown.

=== Return to Chasetown ===
Slater was once again a key member of the Chasetown team, playing 33 games in the 2008–09 season, as they reached the play-off final, only to lose out 1–0 to Nuneaton Town. He played another 35 league games in 2009–10, helping the club gain promotion out of the Northern Premier League Division One South via the play-offs with a 1–0 win over Glapwell. He remained at the club throughout 2010–11, as the club competed at the seventh level of the English football league pyramid for the first time in its history. However, the "Scholars" could not survive at such a high level and were relegated in 2011–12. They reached the Division One South play-off final in 2012–13, where they were beaten 2–1 by Stamford. The club finished 12th in 2013–14 and 13th in 2014–15, and Slater exceeded 500 appearances for the club in April 2015. He left the club at the end of the 2016–17 season having broken the club's all-time appearance record.

=== Walsall Wood ===
Slater joined Midland League side Walsall Wood after being signed by Gary Birch in June 2017. He helped the "Prims" to win the Division One title at the end of the 2017–18 season.

=== Third spell at Chasetown ===
Slater returned again to Chasetown as a player-coach for the 2020–21 season. He made five appearances in cup competitions in the 2021–22 season. He was still a player-coach at the club in October 2023 and noted that he was now coaching his son.

== Career statistics ==
Appearances and goals by club, season and competition
| Club | Season | League | | | Other | | Total | |
| Club | Season | Division | Apps | Goals | Apps | Goals | Apps | Goals |
|---|---|---|---|---|---|---|---|---|
| Chasetown | 2005–06 | Midland Football Alliance | 44 | 0 | 13 | 0 | 53 | 0 |
| Port Vale | 2007–08 | League One | 5 | 0 | 0 | 0 | 5 | 0 |
| Port Vale | 2008–09 | League Two | 6 | 0 | 2 | 0 | 8 | 0 |
| Port Vale | Total | | 11 | 0 | 2 | 0 | 13 | 0 |
| Chasetown | 2009–10 | Northern Premier League Division One South | 35 | 0 | 4 | 0 | 39 | 0 |
| Chasetown | 2010–11 | Northern Premier League Premier Division | 24 | 0 | 5 | 0 | 29 | 0 |
| Chasetown | 2011–12 | Northern Premier League Premier Division | 30 | 1 | 6 | 0 | 36 | 1 |
| Chasetown | 2012–13 | Northern Premier League Division One South | 30 | 0 | 11 | 0 | 41 | 0 |
| Chasetown | 2013–14 | Northern Premier League Division One South | 36 | 0 | 12 | 0 | 48 | 0 |
| Chasetown | 2014–15 | Northern Premier League Division One South | 41 | 0 | 14 | 0 | 55 | 0 |
| Chasetown | 2015–16 | Northern Premier League Division One South | 34 | 0 | 6 | 0 | 40 | 0 |
| Chasetown | 2016–17 | Northern Premier League Division One South | 27 | 0 | 8 | 0 | 35 | 0 |
| Chasetown | 2020–21 | Northern Premier League Division One South East | 5 | 0 | 2 | 0 | 7 | 0 |
| Chasetown | 2021–22 | Northern Premier League Division One Midlands | 0 | 0 | 5 | 0 | 5 | 0 |
| Chasetown | 2022–23 | Northern Premier League Division One Midlands | 0 | 0 | 1 | 0 | 1 | 0 |
| Chasetown | 2023–24 | Northern Premier League Division One West | 0 | 0 | 0 | 0 | 0 | 0 |

== Honours ==
Chasetown

- Midland Football Alliance: 2005–06
- Northern Premier League Division One South play-offs: 2010

Walsall Wood

- Midland League Division One: 2017–18
