= Charlie O'Loughlin =

English footballer (born 1989)

Personal information
- Full name: Charlie Michael Patrick O'Loughlin
- Date of birth: 17 March 1989 (age 37)
- Place of birth: Birmingham, England
- Height: 6 ft 4 in (1.93 m)
- Position: Defender

Youth career
- 2005–2007: Port Vale

Senior career*
| Years | Team | Apps | (Gls) |
| 2007–2008 | Port Vale | 3 | (0) |
| 2007 | → Nantwich Town (loan) | | |
| 2008 | → Hinckley United (loan) | 7 | (0) |
| 2008–2009 | Nantwich Town | | |
| 2009–2010 | Ilkeston Town | 37 | (2) |
| 2010–2011 | Solihull Moors | | |
| 2011–2014 | Boreham Wood | 100 | (5) |
- * Club domestic league appearances and goals

Charlie Michael Patrick O'Loughlin (born 17 March 1989), is an English former footballer who played as a defender.

He played Football League games for Port Vale in the 2007–08 season. Following a loan spell with Hinckley United, he joined non-League Nantwich Town. In 2009, he signed with Ilkeston Town before joining Solihull Moors the following year. He joined Boreham Wood in May 2011.

== Career ==
O'Loughlin, a tall centre-half, started his career with Port Vale, signing professional forms in May 2007. He joined Nantwich Town on a month-long loan in November 2007, scoring twice on his debut for the club at Spalding United on the 24th of that month. After returning to Vale, he made just three substitute appearances for the club, the first being in a 1–0 defeat at Cheltenham Town on 2 January 2008. He enjoyed a second non-League loan spell in February 2008, this time with Hinckley United, where he made seven league appearances in the Conference North. He was released by Vale at the end of the season after manager Lee Sinnott was pressured by low funds, and saw the players wage bill as the place to save money. He signed for Nantwich on a permanent basis in June 2008.

Not long into his Nantwich career he was sidelined with a cartilage injury. Around this time he enrolled at Nottingham Trent University to attempt to become a qualified quantity surveyor. At the end of the season he moved on to Ilkeston Town. After a season with his new club he was forced to move on once again, as Ilkeston were hit with a transfer embargo. Faced with a number of offers he decided to sign with Solihull Moors. Solihull finished seventh in 2010–11. He signed for league rivals Boreham Wood in May 2011. The "Wood" finished eighth in 2011–12, ninth in 2012–13, and 13th in 2013–14.

== Personal life ==
O'Loughlin attended Nottingham Trent University and graduated with a degree in Quantity Surveying, going on to become a Private Quantity Surveyor in London.

== Career statistics ==
Appearances and goals by club, season and competition
| Club | Season | League | | | FA Cup | | Other | | Total | |
| Club | Season | Division | Apps | Goals | Apps | Goals | Apps | Goals | Apps | Goals |
|---|---|---|---|---|---|---|---|---|---|---|
| Port Vale | 2007–08 | League One | 3 | 0 | 0 | 0 | 0 | 0 | 3 | 0 |
| Hinckley United (loan) | 2007–08 | Northern Premier League; Division One South | 7 | 0 | 0 | 0 | 0 | 0 | 7 | 0 |
| Ilkeston Town | 2009–10 | Conference North | 37 | 2 | 0 | 0 | 0 | 0 | 37 | 2 |
| Boreham Wood | 2011–12 | Conference South | 37 | 2 | 0 | 0 | 2 (Note: Appearance(s) in FA Trophy) | 0 | 39 | 2 |
| Boreham Wood | 2012–13 | Conference South | 37 | 3 | 2 | 0 | 4 (Note: 3 appearances in FA Trophy and 1 appearance in Herts Senior Cup) | 0 | 43 | 3 |
| Boreham Wood | 2013–14 | Conference South | 26 | 0 | 6 | 0 | 1 | 0 | 33 | 0 |
| Boreham Wood | Total | | 100 | 5 | 8 | 0 | 7 | 0 | 115 | 5 |
