= Joe Davis (footballer, born 1993) =

English footballer

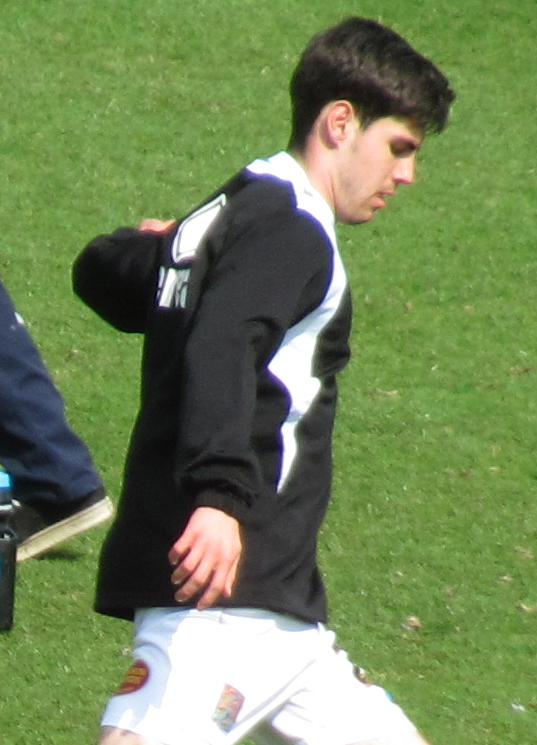
- Davis warming up for Port Vale in 2013

Personal information
- Full name: Joseph Steven Davis
- Date of birth: 10 November 1993 (age 32)
- Place of birth: Burnley, England
- Height: 6 ft 0 in (1.83 m)
- Position: Centre back

Team information
- Current team: Nantwich Town

Youth career
- 2002–2010: Port Vale

Senior career*
Years	Team	Apps	(Gls)
2010–2014	Port Vale	27	(0)
2013–2014	→ Luton Town (loan)	6	(0)
2014–2016	Leicester City	0	(0)
2015–2016	→ Fleetwood Town (loan)	9	(0)
2016–2017	Fleetwood Town	14	(0)
2017–2019	Port Vale	18	(0)
2018–2019	→ York City (loan)	7	(0)
2019–2020	Nantwich Town	28	(1)
2025–2026	Northwich Victoria		
2026–	Nantwich Town	0	(0)
- * Club domestic league appearances and goals

Joseph Steven Davis (born 10 November 1993) is an English semi-professional footballer who plays as a centre back for Northern Premier League Division One West club Nantwich Town.

Davis is son of professional manager Steve Davis and brother of Harry Davis. He came through the Port Vale Academy and played a minor role as the club secured promotion out of League Two in the 2012–13 season. He left Port Vale to join Leicester City in June 2014. He was loaned out to Fleetwood Town in October 2015 before joining the club permanently three months later. He re-signed with Port Vale in June 2017 and was loaned to York City in November 2018. He left Port Vale for Nantwich Town in March 2019 before retiring in June 2020 to pursue a career in the media. After five years away from the game, he signed with Northwich Victoria in June 2025 and returned to Nantwich Town at the end of the season.

== Career ==
=== Port Vale ===
Davis started his career in the youth team ranks at Port Vale in 2002. Described as a "natural born leader", he was handed a squad number for the 2010–11 season, making the first-team bench in October 2010. This came a month after a highly impressive reserve team performance against Sheffield Wednesday. His debut came on 30 April 2011, as he came on as a substitute to replace Gareth Owen seventy minutes into a 7–2 home win over Morecambe.

The 2011–12 season was the final year of his youth contract. He made his second appearance at senior level on 17 March, when he replaced Paul Marshall 49 minutes into a 3–2 defeat away to Crawley Town; manager Micky Adams put him on as centre-back Clayton McDonald had just been sent off. McDonald's subsequent suspension gave Davis the opportunity to start against Hereford United three days later, Adams saying "he'll either sink or swim". He was voted man of the match after he produced "a disciplined defensive display beyond his tender years". However, he was sent off 69 minutes into the next match for a professional foul on Torquay United's Rene Howe; the penalty kick was converted to cost Vale a 2–1 away defeat. With Clayton McDonald facing legal issues, Davis was given an extended run in the team towards the end of the 2011–12 season, thus securing the 18-year-old apprentice his first professional contract. At the end of the season he was given both the club's Youth and Young Player of the Year awards. He announced his intention to accept the club's offer of a new two-year contract in June 2012. Despite being one of the last of the 16 players offered contracts to commit his future to the club, Micky Adams said that the deal was "never in doubt". They told the media of the "excellent potential" he saw in the young defender.

Davis started the opening match of the 2012–13 season, a 3–1 home defeat to Burnley in the League Cup, but was substituted at half-time following a mistimed back-pass that allowed Charlie Austin to score for Burnley. His replacement, Clayton McDonald, then formed an impressive partnership with John McCombe to leave Davis on the sidelines. Facing Northampton Town away on 27 October, Gareth Owen filled the gap left after McDonald picked up a one-match suspension but was replaced by Davis at half-time after picking up an injury; McCombe was also sent off in the match, leaving Davis to cope adequately at centre-back alongside fellow teenager Kingsley James. Vale secured promotion at the end of the season with a third-place finish. However, Davis featured on only ten occasions.

Having failed to make an appearance for Port Vale at the start of the 2013–14 season, he was loaned out to Conference Premier club Luton Town in November 2013. He played nine times for Luton, with the club winning seven and drawing two matches with Davis in the team. Luton manager John Still requested an extension to the loan but Micky Adams recalled Davis to provide cover for the injured Richard Duffy. On 11 January an injury crisis meant that he started in an inexperienced centre-back partnership with 19-year-old Jack Grimmer as Vale lost 2–0 away to league leaders Brentford. He was publicly praised by Adams for his performance in the match, and Davis told the Sentinel that "I'm hoping to cement my place and get myself going again." He earned a place on the Football League Team of the Week for his performance as "a commanding figure" in a 0–0 draw at Shrewsbury Town on 15 February.

=== Leicester City and Fleetwood Town ===
On 30 June 2014, Davis signed for Premier League club Leicester City, who placed him in their development squad.

He joined League One club Fleetwood Town on 3 October 2015 on a one-month loan, alongside Stoke City centre-back Dionatan Teixeira, following an injury crisis at the club. After impressing on his loan spell, Davis signed for Fleetwood permanently on 11 January 2016 on a contract of undisclosed length for an undisclosed fee. He ended the 2015–16 season with 25 appearances to his name as Fleetwood posted a 19th-place finish, but played just eight times throughout the 2016–17 season.

=== Return to Port Vale ===
Davis negotiated his release from Fleetwood to re-sign for Port Vale, now in League Two, on 21 June 2017 on a two-year contract. He picked up a thigh injury in September. He was ruled out of action for three months, before he was recalled to the first-team by new manager Neil Aspin in December to replace the suspended James Gibbons at right back. He was transfer-listed at the end of the 2017–18 season.

He joined National League North club York City on 9 November 2018 on a short-term loan. He made his debut the following day, starting in a 2–1 defeat away to Swindon Town in the FA Cup first round. He returned to Vale on 11 January 2019 having made 10 appearances for York. New manager John Askey agreed a deal to release him from his contract early on 1 March.

"Looking at where the club is today, it is staggering to think that I drove away from Vale Park with not only a concern for my own future, but a fear for the future of the football club's existence. I left it at its lowest point, spiralling towards administration under Norman Smurthwaite, along with a disgruntled fan-base and a group of players that had lost faith in its leadership."

— The future at the club seemed very bleak at the time of Davis's departure, though things soon changed when Carol Shanahan became the club's new owner in May.

=== Nantwich Town ===
Davis joined Northern Premier League Premier Division club Nantwich Town in March 2019. He won the Cheshire Senior Cup with the club after playing in the 5–2 victory over Cammell Laird 1907 in the final. He also helped Nantwich to reach the play-offs, where they were beaten by Warrington Town in the semi-final. The 2019–20 season was formally abandoned on 26 March 2020 due to the COVID-19 pandemic, with Nantwich sixth in the table.

=== Return to football ===
On 1 June 2025, after five years without a club, Davis signed a one-year deal with Northwich Victoria of the Midland League Premier Division. He rejoined Nantwich Town in August 2026, also reuniting with brother Harry at the club.

== Style of play ==
Elder brother Harry described him as "a tough tackler... he'll put his head in anywhere". Defensive partner at Port Vale John McCombe added that "he's aggressive and reads the game well." Port Vale teammate Tom Pope added that Davis is calm in possession and technically sound.

== Personal life ==
Davis was born in Burnley, Lancashire. His father is former Crewe Alexandra manager Steve Davis, and his elder brother Harry played for Crewe, but is now at AFC Fylde – all three family members are defenders. On 22 February 2014, for 33 minutes of a match at Port Vale, Harry and Joe Davis played on opposite teams against each other, while their father watched as manager of Crewe. Joe later stated that the experience had a negative psychological effect on him and also recalled that manager Micky Adams had previously banned him from the training ground in games against Crewe so that he wouldn't divulge tactics to his father. By June 2020, he was studying for a degree in Sports Writing and Broadcasting at Staffordshire University and writing a column in the Blackpool Gazette. After retiring from football, he and Tim Alexander co-founded MOJOE, a tech start-up that aimed to provide a digital community to athletes to them with their transitions away from elite sport.

== Career statistics ==
As of match played 25 January 2020

Appearances and goals by club, season and competition
Club	Season	League			FA Cup		League Cup		Other		Total	
Club	Season	Division	Apps	Goals	Apps	Goals	Apps	Goals	Apps	Goals	Apps	Goals
Port Vale	2010–11	League Two	1	0	0	0	0	0	0	0	1	0
Port Vale	2011–12	League Two	8	0	0	0	0	0	0	0	8	0
Port Vale	2012–13	League Two	7	0	1	0	1	0	1 (Note: Appearance(s) in Football League Trophy)	0	10	0
Port Vale	2013–14	League One	11	0	1	0	0	0	0	0	12	0
Port Vale	Total		27	0	2	0	1	0	1	0	31	0
Luton Town (loan)	2013–14	Conference Premier	6	0	—		—		3 (Note: Appearances in FA Trophy)	0	9	0
Leicester City	2014–15	Premier League	0	0	0	0	0	0	—		0	0
Leicester City	2015–16	Premier League	0	0	—		0	0	—		0	0
Leicester City	Total		0	0	0	0	0	0	—		0	0
Fleetwood Town	2015–16	League One	19	0	1	0	—		5	0	25	0
Fleetwood Town	2016–17	League One	4	0	2	0	0	0	2 (Note: Appearances in EFL Trophy)	0	8	0
Fleetwood Town	Total		23	0	3	0	0	0	7	0	33	0
Port Vale	2017–18	League Two	18	0	0	0	1	0	2	0	21	0
Port Vale	2018–19	League Two	0	0	—		0	0	0	0	0	0
Port Vale	Total		18	0	0	0	1	0	2	0	21	0
York City (loan)	2018–19	National League North	7	0	1	0	—		2	0	10	0
Nantwich Town	2018–19	Northern Premier League; Premier Division	4	0	—		—		2 (Note: 1 appearance in the play-offs and 1 appearance in the Cheshire Senior Cup)	0	6	0
Nantwich Town	2019–20	Northern Premier League; Premier Division	24	1	5	1	1	1	3	0	33	3
Nantwich Town	2026–27	Northern Premier League; Division One West	0	0	0	0	0	0	0	0	0	0
Nantwich Town	Total		28	1	5	1	1	1	5	0	39	3
Career total			109	1	11	1	3	1	20	0	143	3

== Honours ==
Nantwich Town

- Cheshire Senior Cup: 2018–19
