= Kingsley James =

English footballer (born 1992)

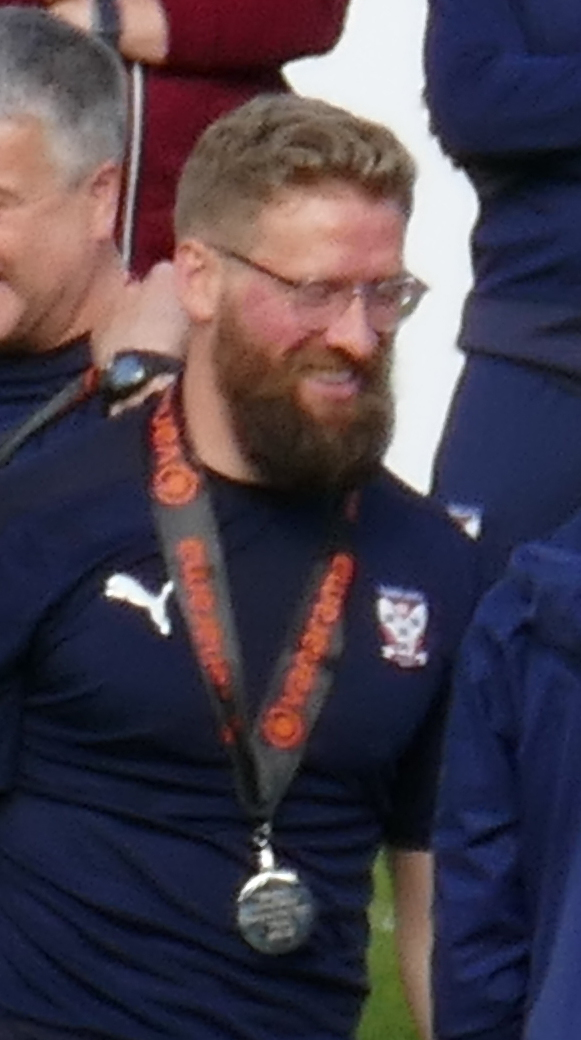
- James with York City in 2022

Personal information
- Full name: Kingsley Tyrone James
- Date of birth: 17 February 1992 (age 34)
- Place of birth: Rotherham, England
- Height: 6 ft 1 in (1.85 m)
- Position: Midfielder

Team information
- Current team: Selby Town & Hallam (dual registration)

Youth career
- 2002–2010: Sheffield United

Senior career*
Years	Team	Apps	(Gls)
2010–2011	Sheffield United	0	(0)
2011–2013	Port Vale	11	(0)
2011	→ Chasetown (loan)	5	(2)
2013	→ Hereford United (loan)	21	(1)
2013–2014	Hereford United	23	(2)
2014–2015	Chester	40	(2)
2015–2016	FC Halifax Town	46	(7)
2016–2017	Macclesfield Town	36	(5)
2017–2018	Chester	31	(2)
2018	→ Barrow (loan)	14	(0)
2018–2019	Guiseley	37	(5)
2019–2020	Gainsborough Trinity	27	(0)
2020–2021	Hyde United	12	(0)
2020	→ Farsley Celtic (loan)	0	(0)
2026–	Selby Town	0	(0)
2026–	→ Hallam (dual registration)	0	(0)

International career
2014–2016	England C	4	(1)
- * Club domestic league appearances and goals

Kingsley Tyrone James (born 17 February 1992) is an English football player and coach who plays as a midfielder for Northern Counties East League Division One club Selby Town and Northern Premier League Division One East club Hallam on dual registration.

A former Sheffield United youth team captain, he switched to Port Vale in the summer of 2011. He was loaned out to Chasetown in October 2011. He joined Hereford United on loan in January 2013. Port Vale were promoted out of League Two in 2012–13, and he left the "Valiants" to play for Hereford permanently. He represented England at semi-professional level. He switched to Chester in June 2014 and then to FC Halifax Town in July 2015. He played for Halifax in their 2016 FA Trophy final victory over Grimsby Town before he joined Macclesfield Town in July 2016. He played in Macclesfield's defeat at the 2017 FA Trophy final and then returned to Chester in June 2017. He spent the second half of the 2017–18 campaign on loan at Barrow after Chester were unable to pay his wages. He signed with Guiseley in July 2018 and played for the club in the 2019 West Riding County Cup final. He joined Gainsborough Trinity in May 2019. He switched to Hyde United in June 2020 and was loaned to Farsley Celtic in November 2020. He retired in September 2021 and came out of retirement five years later to play for Selby Town. He also played for Hallam on dual registration.

== Club career ==
=== Sheffield United ===
James began his career as a youth team player at Championship club Sheffield United; after joining at the age of ten, he went on to captain the likes of Kyle Naughton and Kyle Walker in the youth team. Kevin Blackwell handed him his first-team début in the League Cup first round 2–0 defeat by Hartlepool United at Victoria Park on 11 August 2010 – he was replaced by Jamie Ward on 66 minutes. This would prove to be his only appearance for the club. He and teammate Phil Roe followed former United manager Micky Adams to League Two side Port Vale in July 2011. Adams pursued the youngster despite having refused to offer him a new contract as United manager.

=== Port Vale ===
He missed the start of the 2011–12 season due to a knee injury. He joined Chasetown of the Northern Premier League Premier Division on loan on 20 October. He scored on his Chasetown début in the FA Trophy, then followed this up with two goals on his league début at Marine. He played a further five games without scoring, before returning to Vale Park in December. James made his Port Vale deébut on 7 January 2012, replacing Gareth Owen 63 minutes into a 3–0 defeat at Southend United. He was given his first start against Shrewsbury Town at the New Meadow on 27 March. However, the match was abandoned after 64 minutes due to a fire caused by the failure of the floodlights. He agreed to sign a new one-year deal with the club in June 2012.

He hoped to establish himself in the centre of midfield in the 2012–13 season following the departure of Anthony Griffith. James filled in at centre-back for 45 minutes against Northampton Town at Sixfields on 27 October, after a catalogue of injuries and suspensions left only James and Joe Davis as the two players with any experience of the position. He provided an assist for a Tom Pope goal in a 4–1 win over Wycombe Wanderers on 20 October, his second appearance of the season. He won his first start for the club on 20 November, in a 4–0 win over Bristol Rovers.

=== Hereford United ===
On 28 January 2013, he joined Martin Foyle's Hereford United on a one-month loan deal. He made eight Conference National starts for the "Bulls", and his loan spell was extended until the end of the 2012–13 campaign. He became a key member of the first-team, and scored his first goal for the club on 1 April, in a 5–2 win over Tamworth at Edgar Street. He played 21 games for Hereford, before returning to Vale in time to see the club promoted into League One. He was not offered a new contract at the end of the season and was released as a free agent.

After leaving Port Vale, James began training with Hereford in July 2013, and signed a one-year contract the following month. He made 23 appearances in the 2013–14 campaign.

=== Chester ===
James signed a one-year contract with Steve Burr's Chester in June 2014. He scored three goals in 46 appearances during the 2014–15 campaign and elected to leave the "Seals" following a strong first half and finish to the season which attracted interest from clubs in the English Football League.

=== FC Halifax Town ===
James turned down a two-year contract from Chester to move to a club closer to his Barnsley home, and in July 2015 joined National League club FC Halifax Town. Halifax were forced to pay Chester £8,000 compensation with a 20% sell-on clause following a tribunal. He scored 11 goals in 57 appearances across the 2015–16 campaign as Halifax were relegated in 21st-place, one point short of safety. He did, though play at Wembley Stadium in the FA Trophy final, coming on as a 74th-minute substitute for Scott McManus as Halifax beat Grimsby Town 1–0.

=== Macclesfield Town ===
James was sold to Macclesfield Town for an undisclosed fee in July 2016 and signed a one-year contract. He made 48 appearances across the 2016–17 campaign, including in the 2017 FA Trophy final at Wembley Stadium, where Macclesfield were beaten 3–2 by York City.

=== Return to Chester ===
In June 2017, James rejected Macclesfield's offer of a new deal and re-signed with Chester after agreeing to a two-year contract; he was the third Macclesfield player to move to the Deva Stadium that summer. However, the "Seals" struggled to pay his wages due to financial difficulties, and on 16 February he was sent on loan to divisional relegation rivals Barrow. He made a good impression at Holker Street, and quickly earned praise from assistant manager Jamie Day. He proved to be a key player for Adrian Pennock's "Bluebirds", who managed to avoid relegation at the expensive of parent club Chester. Speaking before the match between Chester and Barrow towards the end of the campaign, James said that "My sole focus is on Barrow, that's where I'm playing at the minute. Whatever has happened with Chester, it's not personal, it's just business". His contract with Chester was cancelled by mutual consent on 4 July. Manager Anthony Johnson praised James for accepting the settlement on his contract, which had been taking up a significant portion of the club's wage budget.

=== Guiseley ===
On 10 July 2018, James signed with National League North side Guiseley. On 22 September, he scored a first-half hat-trick as the "Lions" recorded a 4–0 victory over Staveley Miners Welfare in the second qualifying round of the FA Cup. He went on to play for Guiseley in their FA Cup second-round defeat to League One side Fleetwood Town, televised on BT Sport. He scored six goals in 40 appearances across the 2018–19 campaign, as Guiseley went on to reach the final of the West Riding County Cup, which they lost to Ossett United. He left Guiseley in May 2019.

=== Gainsborough Trinity ===
On 22 May 2019, James joined Northern Premier League Premier Division side Gainsborough Trinity; assistant manager Ross Hannah described the signing as a "big coup" for the "Holy Blues". As a result of the COVID-19 pandemic in England, the 2019–20 season was formally abandoned on 26 March, with all results from the season being expunged.

=== Hyde United ===
On 10 June 2020, James signed with Hyde United. "Tigers" manager David McGurk said that "he works with me and John with our coaching company so we know he's the exact type of character we want". On 6 November 2020, James arrived on loan at Farsley Celtic in the National League North, who were able to continue to play whilst Hyde were shut down during the second national coronavirus lockdown. He never made an appearance at The Citadel however, and the 2020–21 season was soon curtailed for both Hyde and Celtic. He retired on 1 September 2021.

=== Selby Town ===
In June 2026, James came out of retirement, joining Northern Counties East League Division One club Selby Town. On 30 October, he joined Northern Premier League Division One East club Hallam on dual registration.

== International career ==
James scored on his debut for the England C team against Estonia under-23's on 18 November 2014.

== Coaching career ==
James has coached youth players at Sheffield United, Port Vale and Hereford United. On 19 November 2021, he joined York City as a first-team coach. On 16 November 2022, manager John Askey was sacked and James left the club shortly afterwards.

== Personal life ==
Although many of his friends and family were Rotherham United fans, James supported Manchester United as a boy. He married Emily on 21 May 2016, the day before he played for Halifax in the 2016 FA Trophy final.

== Career statistics ==
Appearances and goals by club, season and competition
Season	Club	League			FA Cup		League Cup		Other		Total	
Season	Club	Division	Apps	Goals	Apps	Goals	Apps	Goals	Apps	Goals	Apps	Goals
Sheffield United	2010–11	Championship	0	0	0	0	1	0	—		1	0
Port Vale	2011–12	League Two	5	0	—		—		—		5	0
Port Vale	2012–13	League Two	6	0	1	0	0	0	0	0	7	0
Port Vale	Total		11	0	1	0	0	0	0	0	12	0
Chasetown (loan)	2010–11	NPL Premier Division	5	2	0	0	—		0	0	5	2
Hereford United	2012–13	Conference Premier	21	1	0	0	—		0	0	21	1
Hereford United	2013–14	Conference Premier	23	2	0	0	—		0	0	23	2
Hereford United	Total		44	3	0	0	0	0	0	0	44	3
Chester	2014–15	Conference Premier	40	2	4	0	—		2 (Note: Appearance(s) in FA Trophy)	1	46	3
FC Halifax Town	2015–16	National League	46	7	3	1	—		8	3	57	11
Macclesfield Town	2016–17	National League	36	5	3	0	—		9	1	48	6
Chester	2017–18	National League	31	2	1	0	—		2	0	34	2
Barrow (loan)	2017–18	National League	14	0	—		—		0	0	14	0
Guiseley	2018–19	National League North	37	5	3	1	—		0	0	40	6
Gainsborough Trinity	2019–20	NPL Premier Division	27	0	3	2	1	0	2	1	33	3
Hyde United	2020–21	NPL Premier Division	6	0	2	1	—		2	1	10	2
Hyde United	2021–22	NPL Premier Division	6	0	0	0	—		0	0	6	0
Hyde United	Total		12	0	2	1	0	0	2	1	16	2
Farsley Celtic (loan)	2020–21	National League North	0	0	0	0	—		0	0	0	0
Selby Town	2026–27	Northern Counties East; Division One	0	0	0	0	—		0	0	0	0
Hallam (dual registration)	2026–27	Northern Premier League; Division One East	0	0	—		—		0	0	0	0
Career total			303	26	20	5	2	0	25	7	350	38

== Honours ==
Port Vale

- Football League Two third-place promotion: 2012–13

FC Halifax Town

- FA Trophy: 2015–16

Macclesfield Town

- FA Trophy runner-up: 2016–17

Guiseley

- West Riding County Cup runner-up: 2018–19
