= 2011–12 Port Vale F.C. season =

Port Vale F.C.
2011–12 season
- Chairman: Mike Lloyd (until 31 October; Peter Miller (31 October – 31 December); Administrators (from 9 March)
- Manager: Micky Adams
- Stadium: Vale Park
- Football League Two: 12th (59 points)
- FA Cup: First Round (eliminated by Grimsby Town)
- League Cup: First Round (eliminated by Huddersfield Town)
- Football League Trophy: First Round (eliminated by Tranmere Rovers)
- Player of the Year: Doug Loft
- Top goalscorer: League: Marc Richards (17); All: Marc Richards (17)
- Highest home attendance: 6,356 vs. Crewe Alexandra, 28 February 2012
- Lowest home attendance: 3,014 vs. Huddersfield Town, 9 August 2011
- Average home league attendance: 4,820
- Biggest win: 4–0 vs. Aldershot Town, 17 December 2011
- Biggest defeat: 0–5 vs. Swindon Town, 28 April 2012
Home colours	Away colours

The 2011–12 season was Port Vale's 100th season of football in the English Football League, and fourth-successive season in League Two. It marked the start of Micky Adams' second spell in charge of the club, and despite fan unrest with the board, Vale fans and players were hopeful of promotion come the end of the season. However, a ten-point deduction for entering administration doomed the club to a mid-table finish. They exited both the League Cup and Football League Trophy at the first round following defeats to League One clubs. They also crashed out of the FA Cup in the first round against non-League opposition.

Behind the scenes, former chairman Bill Bratt left the club, as a new look board was installed, consisting of chairman Peter Miller, vice-chairman Mike Lloyd, CEO Perry Deakin, and Glenn Oliver, with only Oliver having any connection to the previous Valiant2001 regime. In September, this new board announced that sports construction firm Blue Sky International was planning to invest £8 million into the club. However, doubts quickly began to emerge over the deal. In December, the CEO of Blue Sky confirmed that the company had never agreed to any such deal and that they would not be investing any money into the club.

The club's financial problems and boardroom infighting left Adams unable to strengthen his squad during the January transfer window, making promotion an unlikely goal by the halfway stage. The club was unable to pay the player's wages in February. On 29 February, HM Revenue and Customs issued the club with a winding up petition. The club entered administration on 9 March. On 4 April, the administrators revealed Keith Ryder as the preferred bidder, though he never completed the deal.

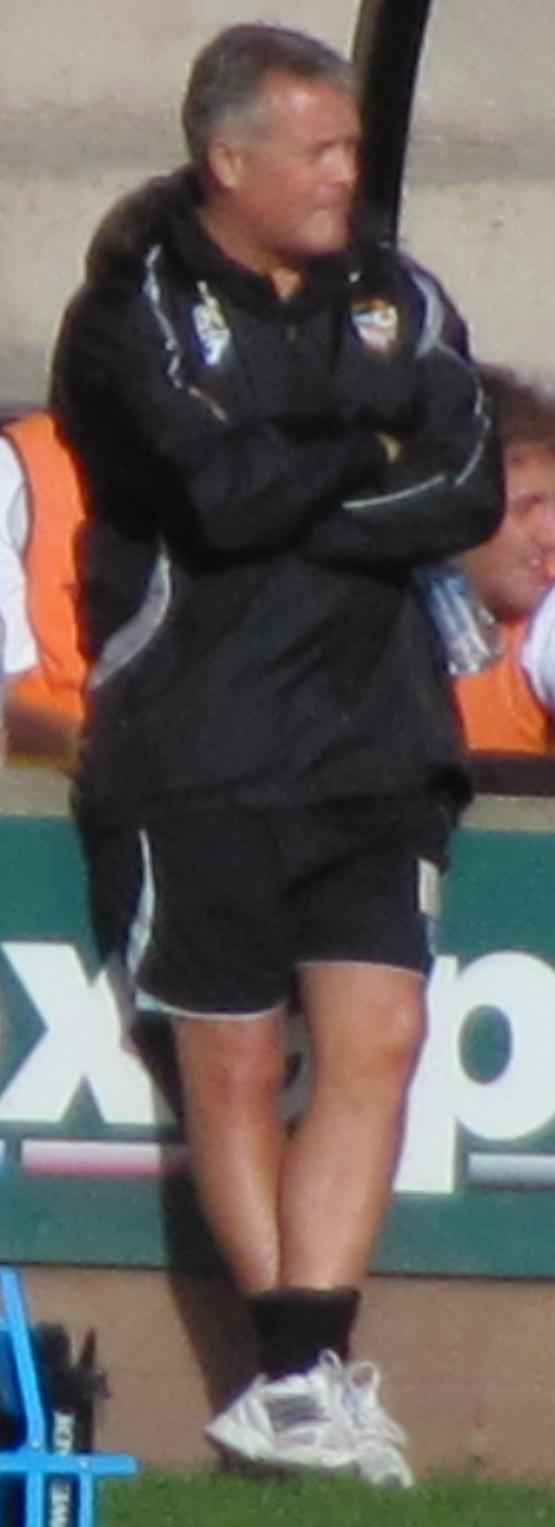
Manager Micky Adams.

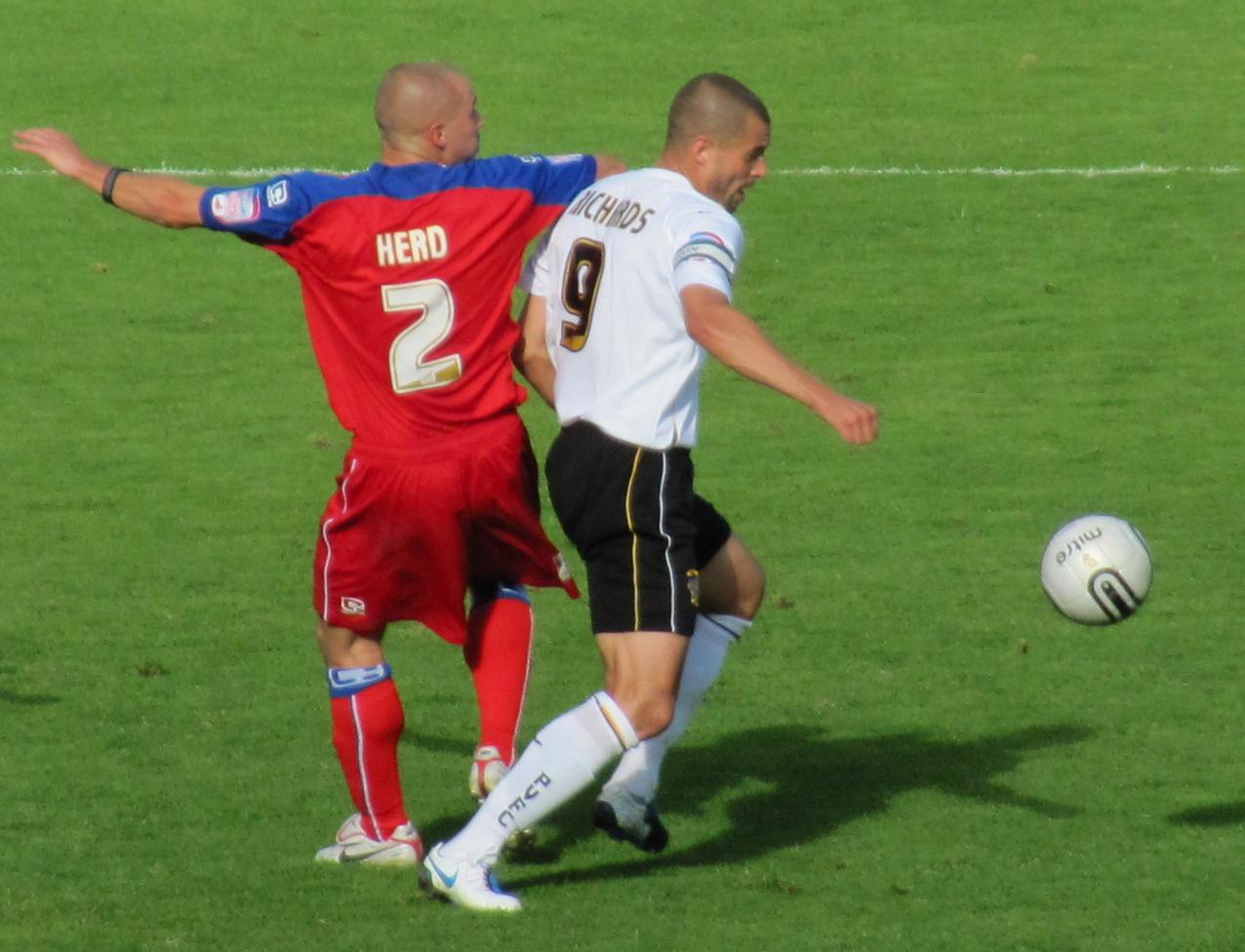
Star striker Marc Richards.

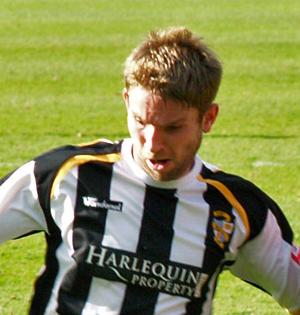
Key defender John McCombe.

== Overview ==
=== League Two ===
The return of Micky Adams meant that Vale could enter the pre-season looking to improve the playing squad rather than search for a new manager. His first signings of the season were former Glenn Hoddle Academy youngsters Ryan Burge and Ben Williamson, a midfielder and striker respectively. Adams' notoriously tough pre-season training regime began in earnest, though the players reported that they had come to expect the hard work come summertime and Adams himself was pleased with the condition his players began the pre-season in. Adams built on his new youth policy with the signatures of Sheffield United duo Kingsley James and Phil Roe; as well as Walsall defender Clayton McDonald, and left-back Mike Green. The club undertook a tour of North America for the first time in its history, where they recorded victories over USL Premier Development League sides North Sound SeaWolves, Tacoma Tide, Kitsap Pumas, and Victoria Highlanders. Following this tour, Justin Richards made a surprise exit to Burton Albion – this left namesake Marc as the club's senior player at the relatively young age of 29, in one of the club's youngest ever squads. To replace the departing striker former loanee – and self-confirmed Vale supporter – Tom Pope was signed from Rotherham United.

Vale began the season with a run of four games unbeaten, picking up easy wins over Accrington Stanley and Barnet and hard-fought draws with Crawley Town and Burton Albion, before finishing August with a 3–2 defeat to Southend United. Following a spate of injuries Adams signed Rangers and Northern Ireland utility player Andrew Little on a four-month loan. With 25 goals in the first six league games, Vale players found scoring goals easy, but the strength of the previous season – defending – seemed to have left them. A brace from Gary Roberts consigned Plymouth Argyle to a sixth consecutive defeat as Port Vale won 2–0 at Home Park; both sides finished the match with ten men after Marc Richards and Ladjie Soukouna were sent off. In September, a brace from Rob Taylor and late winner from Pope were enough to beat Bradford City, as Vale climbed into the automatic promotion places. On 22 September, Adams signed free agent Rob Kozluk on a short-term contract until 1 January 2012, and also brought in Liam Chilvers on a month's loan from Notts County (a loan deal later extended to 24 December); both players were signed to bolster Vale's struggling defence. The pair made their débuts two days later, as Vale earned a 1–1 draw with local rivals Crewe Alexandra at the Alexandra Stadium – Pope finding an equaliser just two minutes after Byron Moore gave the "Railwaymen" the lead.

However, after scoring in all of their first 15 league and cup games, a 4–0 home defeat by Morecambe sent the "Valiants" down to eleventh place; in doing so the "Shrimps" avenged the 7–2 defeat inflicted upon them at the Globe Arena on the penultimate day of the 2010–11 season. Andrew Little returned to parent club Rangers after the game, having damaged his knee ligaments during the defeat. Mike Green also left the club after asking to have his contract terminated following a loan spell at Eastleigh. After a run of five games without a win – which included 388 minutes without scoring a goal – Adams signed Cameroonian striker Guy Madjo and winger Jennison Myrie-Williams on loan from Stevenage, as well as Irish defender Shane O'Connor on loan from Ipswich Town. The two Stevenage loanees scored a goal a piece against struggling Dagenham & Redbridge on 10 December, to give the Vale their first win in more than six weeks. Supporters showed their disapproval against the board by displaying red cards in the home fixture against Aldershot Town, a game in which Madjo scored a hat-trick. Following this match, both Roe and McDonald were signed until the end of the season, whilst Kozluk was released. On 30 December, midfield playmaker Gary Roberts had his contract terminated following two serious breaches of club discipline in the space of three months. Nominated for the Manager of the Month award for three wins in four December games, Adams revealed that due to the club's precarious financial position he was unable to sign any new players or even retain his loan players in the January transfer window – despite the chairman having previously told him to draw up a list of transfer targets. Contract negotiations were also put on hold.

In addition to off-the-field troubles in January, Adams also had to deal with an injury crisis to his small squad; already missing Ryan Burge and Lewis Haldane with long-term injuries, the treatment room also welcomed Marc Richards, Rob Taylor, Gareth Owen, Tom Pope and Lee Collins. Vale suffered four consecutive defeats, before managing to turn things around by the end of the month with 1–0 wins over Rotherham United and Plymouth Argyle. On 14 February, midfielders Chris Shuker and Paul Marshall joined the club on non-contract terms. However, the treatment room grew more busy, as Adam Yates and Tom Pope picked up injuries requiring several weeks of rest. The club expected to receive a boost when Trinidad and Tobago international Chris Birchall returned from the Los Angeles Galaxy to play for the club on a month-by-month basis; however, the club were hit by a transfer embargo by the Football League on 25 February for failing to pay a bill. Nevertheless, performances on the pitch were solid, and Vale entered the Crewe derby having won four and drawn one of their last five games. The derby finished honours even again at 1–1, with a late header from Byron Moore cancelling out the own goal scored by Crewe captain David Artell.

A 2–1 home defeat by Barnet on 10 March ended Vale's run of eight game unbeaten; combined with a ten-point deduction for entering administration, the club slipped from 9th to 14th in the space of 24 hours. Promising young defender Lee Collins was the first the leave the club post-administration, joining Championship side Barnsley on a loan deal worth £50,000 to the Vale on 15 March. The drama continued in the game against Shrewsbury Town on 27 March, as the match was abandoned after 64 minutes due to a fire caused by the failure of the floodlights at the New Meadow. With the season drawing to a close, Adams began developing his squad for the following season, and announced that he had 'reluctantly' released defender Charlie Raglan, without giving him his first-team debut. He offered contracts to all but three players: Chris Martin, Phil Roe, and Paul Marshall; he also placed Burge on the transfer list. Aside from Lee Collins, the first player to reject a contract with Vale to move elsewhere was Anthony Griffith, who signed a two-year deal with League One side Leyton Orient. The first out-of-contract players to pledge their futures to Port Vale were Rob Taylor (two years), Lewis Haldane (six months), Ben Williamson (one year), and Sam Johnson (one year). Days later it was announced that Sean Rigg had signed with Oxford United, whilst Clayton McDonald confirmed that he would accept Vale's offer of a new one-year deal. However, the biggest blow to fan's hopes of promotion came when it was announced that talismanic top-scorer Marc Richards had signed a two-year deal with relegated League One side Chesterfield. June began with John McCombe and Tom Pope both agreeing to sign new deals with the club. The only player to reject the club's offer of a new contract despite not signing a contract elsewhere was goalkeeper Stuart Tomlinson; he eventually ended up at Burton Albion.

=== Finances & ownership issues ===
On the financial side, hostilities were renewed between Bill Bratt's board and some supporters' groups. The North London Valiants rejected a seat on the board after dismissing the offer as "hollow and disingenuous". Bratt resigned as chairman on 29 July, citing a desire to unite the fans, and was replaced by Mike Lloyd. The board of directors at the start of the campaign consisted of: Mike Lloyd (as chairman), Glenn Oliver, Bill Bratt MBE, and Micky Adams (serving as both manager and director). Matchday tickets for adult fans were priced between £20.50 and £21.50 – the highest minimum price for an adult in the division – though a BBC survey placed Vale Park as the eighth priciest venue in the league when food and drink were also factored into the equation. Fan unrest emerged on the opening day of the season, as some 500 protesters campaigned outside the ground during the draw with Crawley Town, before putting their views toward new chairman Mike Lloyd when he came to hear their views. Bratt then announced that he would step down as a director in September following planned investment from an anonymous group. This news was enough to end protests by fan group 'Black and Gold Until It's Sold', as the group waited for Valiant2001's influence in the boardroom to cease completely. In September 2011, the anonymous investors were revealed to be sports construction firm Blue Sky International, who planned to plough £5 million into the club in twelve months, as well as a further £2.5 million by 2016. This sum would secure the long-term future of the club.

Following the Blue Sky investment announcement, club CEO Perry Deakin announced his intention to purchase £100,000 of shares to replace Bill Bratt on the board of directors. Peter Miller, vice-president of the sports and education division of Global Events Group, a consultancy firm based in Atlanta, Georgia, also bought a £250,000 stake in the club. As a result of the imminent investment and departure of the Valiant2001 directors, fan groups 'North London Valiants' and 'Black and Gold Until It's Sold' announced a cease-fire in their protests. 'North London Valiants' representative Malcolm Hirst said that "We feel the time has come to forget our political differences and move forward together"; whilst a 'Black and Gold' spokesman said that "Sadly, the dream of a fan-owned democratically run club proved beyond our reach and we have to accept that the smaller shareholders will not have any influence on the future direction of the club. The promise of a supporter director on the board is, however, a significant compromise." The day after these announcements, Longsdon businessman Mark Sims, who had been voted onto the board four months earlier at the club's EGM, withdrew his candidacy after refusing to take on the required financial guarantees. That same day Bill Bratt resigned from the board completely and was replaced by as a director by CEO Perry Deakin. Peter Miller (formerly of Luton Town) was voted onto the board on 24 October. Miller was also elected chairman seven days later, with Mike Lloyd becoming vice-chairman.

In November the club were threatened with legal action by Ameriturf, a rival company of Blue Sky that had previously been looking to invest in the club and that had sponsored the pre-season tour of America. Adams stepped down as a director on 5 November, the day of his 100th game in charge at Port Vale. However, eleven days later, doubts began to emerge over the Blue Sky deal, as it was revealed that the deal may not go ahead due to 'contractual issues'. Fan groups criticised the board for their lack of transparency on the issue. It was also revealed that the club had agreed to pay Miller a salary of £100,000 a year (former chairman Bill Bratt was unpaid, though received a £50,000 salary as CEO). Peter Miller issued a statement on the Port Vale website decrying the paper's reporting as being "misleading and unhelpful", and stating that whilst "it is common knowledge", he could "confirm, beyond all doubt, that these sums have been lodged and £350,000 has been received by Port Vale Football Club for our [Deakin and Miller's] respective shareholdings." Former director Stan Meigh called on Miller to resign. Supporters group 'North London Valiants' further discovered that Deakin and Miller had used their 'nil-paid' shares to vote each other onto the board, as well as the 'nil-paid' shares from Blue Sky (this totalled as £500,000 worth of unpaid for shares); combined with 'yes' votes from directors Mike Lloyd and Glenn Oliver this rendered voting from other shareholders a mooted exercise. As these facts were revealed, former prospective investor Mo Chaudry offered to lay on hospitality for the Roy Sproson statue unveiling ceremony, as the club had refused to provide refreshments for former players and Sproson family members. On 8 December, Hank Julicher, CEO of Blue Sky International made the following statement:

"I can tell you categorically that Blue Sky will not be investing in Port Vale Football Club. The deal is dead and has been, in my eyes, for a long time. I simply don't know where these figures of £5 million and £8 million came from. It was never our intention to invest that kind of money into Port Vale. I'd have to be crazy or on drugs to agree to such a thing. By my estimation, the maximum outlay for Blue Sky would have been in the region of $850,000 (the equivalent of about £550,000). The partnership won't be happening. The reason I have remained quiet for so long is that I have visited Port Vale. I have met the people who work there. I have spoken to fans and I've seen the passion. They're good people – honest and hard-working. I don't want to be the guy to punish them or their football club. I'm angry. Really angry. The people I have a problem with are on the board at Port Vale; Peter Miller, Mike Lloyd and Perry Deakin. However, I've received dozens of emails, hand-written letters and phone calls from Port Vale fans recently and so I want to make my position clear: Blue Sky hasn't put any money into Port Vale and won't be doing so. End of story... as for the shares said to have been issued to my wife Margit, and counted in the 'yes' vote for the recent polls to elect Perry Deakin and Peter Miller to the Port Vale board, I know nothing about them and Margit tells me neither does she. In my opinion they are 'ghost stock' – 'phantom shares'. We were supposed to do all these jobs such as the Robbie Williams Suite and then reinvest the money from the profits back into Port Vale. You've seen the contract. The deal I signed back on August 31 was entirely dependent on the club bringing in the money to make these things happen through a variety of sources. Peter Miller talked about lottery funding and other deals they were working on. In my opinion, both I and the club's supporters have been misled."

— Julicher confirmed that Blue Sky International had never invested any money into the club, and claimed that the £8 million deal the club had announced was pure fantasy.

Miller said that this statement was a "blatant misrepresentation of the facts". In October, Blue Sky had announced a ten-year £1.25m sponsorship deal with Yeovil Town. The board responded with another statement on the club's website, and provided documented evidence to prove that Blue Sky did in fact apply for £150,000 of shares and did vote for Miller and Deakin to join the club as directors. Julicher responded by saying "we haven't paid so how the hell do we own shares?" He further said that he backed out of any deal when he was told to pay money upfront and when his own negotiations were ignored: "Peter Miller would just put things off. Finally we had a meeting at Crewe Hall and I said to him 'Where's this stuff, baby? Where's the beef?' But he didn't have any answers, so I said 'It's over'." The club then issued another strongly worded statement, condemning Julicher's "stream of dangerous inaccuracy" and The Sentinel for their "subjective agenda". However, the Supporters' Club voted in favour of another EGM to remove the Miller-led board, as the contract with Blue Sky was revealed, confirming Julicher's words that the company were only ever planning to invest £500,000 in synthetic training pitches. In the December home game against Aldershot Town, 80% of Vale fans in attendance took part in the 'red card' protest against the board. Deakin announced his resignation from the position as CEO on Christmas Eve, claiming that: "Over the last two or three months I have accepted advice from certain individuals at the club about what is best for Port Vale. I am extremely upset and angry about the position I have been placed in through no fault of my own. It is an impossible position."

On 28 December, The Sentinel reported that 22 days earlier, a £277,000 mortgage was taken out on Vale Park to pay for day-to-day operations. The next day, Deakin, Lloyd and Oliver announced that they had "carried out a review of Miller... and decided his tenure [as chairman] should cease" at the end of the calendar year. The leader of Stoke-on-Trent City Council, Mohammed Pervez, told reporters that he was "concerned" about the club's ability to repay a £2.25 million loan taken out in 2006, and also confirmed that the mortgage the club had taken out in December breached the loan agreement with the council. In addition to board members, The Sentinel's Martin Tideswell also criticised local MP Joan Walley, the local council, the FA, and the Football League for not acting to protect the club from its directors: "they fiddle and talk in platitudes while Vale Park burns." Meanwhile, the club's directors announced that the club's AGM would be held on 13 March, having twice postponed the meeting traditionally held in December. On 25 January, fan groups organised an interim board consisting of Pete Williams (supporters' club chairman); Margaret Sinstadt; Mike Thompstone and Paul Humphreys (both of whom former directors who resigned during the 2010–11 campaign) – the former two finding sponsors with at least a £50,000 stake, and the latter two not requiring a stake due to their status as former directors. Six days later, Ameriturf announced that they would again be interested in investing into the club. However, the company that produced the club's matchday programmes threatened the club with legal action after they were allegedly misled over sales figures. In February, Stoke-on-Trent city council confirmed that for the first time the club had missed its monthly repayments of around £19,000 for a £2.25 million loan taken out in 2006. On 25 February, the club were hit with a transfer embargo after failing to pay a tax bill, leaving fears of administration more acute than ever following the club's exit from administration in 2003. Peter Miller then quit the board, leaving just three directors; meanwhile club sponsors Harlequin Property began suing the club over the repayment of a £125,000 loan, and the city council confirmed that it was still owed £9,033 in unpaid loan payments. The players were not paid in February. On 29 February, HM Revenue and Customs issued the club with a winding up petition. Two days later the council proposed putting the club into administration, which was by then the club's only chance of survival. Perry Deakin told the media that he regretted ever getting involved with the club, but laid the blame for the club's collapse at the hands of former chairman Bill Bratt; his parting comment was "Perhaps in hindsight I was a bit naive. I had a look at the club's website and there didn't appear to be any issues there. I guess I should have looked at The Sentinel's site."

==== Administration ====
The club entered administration on 9 March 2012. Stoke-on-Trent City Council agreed to pay £500,000 to cover running costs for the next three months, and also agreed to pay the estimated £100,000 administrators' fee. The administrators were Begbies Traynor, headed by Bob Young (the same "Administrator Man" who took charge in 2003); Young was assisted by Gerald Krasner and Steve Currie. The administrators appointed Wasserman Media Group's Ben Mansford to try and sell the club's players to any interested parties. They also made four redundancies: Hayley Wright (commercial manager), John Baines (media officer), Paula Jones (PA), and Perry Deakin – Deakin had claimed to have announced his resignation weeks ago, but was still on the payroll. On 4 April, the administrators revealed Lancashire businessman Keith Ryder to be the preferred bidder, ahead of bids from Mo Chaudry and several other interested parties. Fans expressed surprise at the decision, but were optimistic of a bright future under Ryder. It was revealed that Ryder had loaned the club £100,000 to stay afloat in February. It was also announced that the City council were to lose £1 million of the £1.8 million the club owed the authority, whilst other creditors received a mere 3p in the £1 for the rest of the £2.7 million debt. Aside from the council and Ryder, the two other significant creditors (owed more than £50,000) were Gibraltar-based loan company Continental Solutions Limited (£277,734) and HMRC (£189,965). More unexpected creditors included £15 of expenses owed to Perry Deakin, £3,550 owed to Rangers and £70 owed to S&A Pet Discs. Ryder revealed himself to be a Manchester United supporter with a keen interest in football; a quiet man, he put forward realistic aims for the club and a wish to keep footballing matters up to Micky Adams. By 6 July, he was allowed to complete his takeover, though he never did.

=== Cup competitions ===
In the FA Cup, Vale faced a home tie with Grimsby Town, a side struggling in the Conference National. A goalless draw meant the Vale had to find victory at Blundell Park to progress. Conference South side Salisbury City awaited in the second round, meaning that Vale only had to beat two non-League sides to progress to a potentially lucrative third round tie. In the replay, Vale were forced to play in the colours of rivals Stoke City, due to a clash of kits. A Serge Makofo goal was enough to settle the tie, as Vale exited the competition at the first round for the first time since 2002. Micky Adams said he was "disappointed and embarrassed" and "I'm angry and disappointed with certain players and a little bit bewildered"; he also criticised the referee for allowing the goal even though Makofo handled the ball. He went on to say that "All leave has been cancelled, there's no more days off. It's double-session time every day until we get it right."

In the League Cup, Vale fell at the first hurdle to highly fancied League One side Huddersfield Town; the "Valiants" took the lead with a Gary Roberts effort, before the "Terriers" recovered to leave Burslem with a 4–2 win.

In the Football League Trophy, Vale exited at the first round to League One Tranmere Rovers following a shoot-out at Prenton Park; Chris Martin scored a penalty and saved one, however, misses by Pope and Roberts proved costly – ironically the pair had only been brought on as last-minute substitutes to take penalties. This meant that Vale had been eliminated from the competition after a defeat in the penalty shoot-out for the third consecutive season. Adams paid little heed to the result though, as he was more concerned with Lewis Haldane, who had to be stretchered off the field with a broken leg.

== Results ==
=== Football League Two ===
==== League table ====
Pos	Team	Pld	W	D	L	GF	GA	GD	Pts
10	Rotherham United	46	18	13	15	67	63	+4	67
11	Aldershot Town	46	19	9	18	54	52	+2	66
12	Port Vale	46	20	9	17	68	60	+8	59 (Note: On 9 March Port Vale were deducted ten points for entering administration.)
13	Bristol Rovers	46	15	12	19	60	70	−10	57
14	Accrington Stanley	46	14	15	17	54	66	−12	57

Updated to match(es) played on 5 May 2012. Source: BBC Sport
Rules for classification: 1) Points; 2) Goal difference; 3) Number of goals scored

==== Results by matchday ====
Round	1	2	3	4	5	6	7	8	9	10	11	12	13	14	15	16	17	18	19	20	21	22	23	24	25	26	27	28	29	30	31	32	33	34	35	36	37	38	39	40	41	42	43	44	45	46
Ground	H	A	A	H	H	A	A	H	H	A	H	A	H	H	A	A	H	A	H	A	H	A	A	H	A	H	A	H	A	H	A	H	A	H	H	A	H	A	H	A	H	A	A	H	A	H
Result	D	W	D	W	L	L	W	W	L	D	W	D	W	L	W	L	L	L	D	W	W	W	L	L	L	L	W	W	D	W	W	D	D	W	L	L	W	L	L	W	W	D	L	W	L	W
Position	9	4	10	6	8	12	7	3	8	11	7	9	8	11	8	9	10	13	12	12	10	9	9	13	13	14	12	11	10	8	8	8	9	9	14	16	14	16	17	15	14	15	15	13	15	12
Points	1	4	5	8	8	8	11	14	14	15	18	19	22	22	25	25	25	25	26	29	32	35	35	35	35	35	38	41	42	45	48	49	50	53	43	43	46	46	46	49	52	53	53	56	56	59

Source: Statto
A = Away; H = Home; W = Win; D = Draw; L = Loss

==== Matches ====
6 August 2011 1	Port Vale F.C.	2–2	Crawley Town	Burslem
15:00 BST	Richards 42'; Dodds 90+1'	Report	Barnett 39'; McFadzean 51'	Stadium: Vale Park; Attendance: 5,889; Referee: David Webb

13 August 2011 2	Barnet	1–3	Port Vale	Chipping Barnet, London
15:00 BST	Price 63'	Report	Rigg 27', 57'; Roberts 37'	Stadium: Underhill Stadium; Attendance: 2,260; Referee: Fred Graham

16 August 2011 3	Burton Albion	1–1	Port Vale	Burton upon Trent
19:45 BST	Webster 23'	Report	Loft 40'	Stadium: Pirelli Stadium; Attendance: 3,608; Referee: Graham Salisbury

20 August 2011 4	Port Vale	4–1	Accrington Stanley	Burslem
15:00 BST	Rigg 19', 43'; Roberts 23'; Pope 37'	Report	Murphy 81'	Stadium: Vale Park; Attendance: 4,615; Referee: Carl Berry

27 August 2011 5	Port Vale	2–3	Southend United	Burslem
15:00 BST	Loft 25', 52' (pen.)	Report	Phillips 5'; Dickinson 10'; Leonard 29'	Stadium: Vale Park; Attendance: 4,615; Referee: Jon Moss

3 September 2011 6	AFC Wimbledon	3–2	Port Vale	Kingston upon Thames
15:00 BST	Midson 40'; Gwillim 60'; Jolley 90+5'	Report	Dodds 46'; Morsy 84'	Stadium: Kingsmeadow; Attendance: 4,404; Referee: Graham Scott

10 September 2011 7	Plymouth Argyle	0–2	Port Vale	Plymouth
15:00 BST		Report	Roberts 26', 84' (pen.)	Stadium: Home Park; Attendance: 5,018; Referee: Craig Pawson

13 September 2011 8	Port Vale	3–2	Bradford City	Burslem
19:45 BST	Taylor 5', 39'; Pope 90+3'	Report	Devitt 24'; Jones 50'	Stadium: Vale Park; Attendance: 4,769; Referee: Dean Whitestone

17 September 2011 9	Port Vale	2–3	Shrewsbury Town	Burslem
13:00 BST	Williamson 26', 81'	Report	Morgan 3'; Wright 14'; Ainsworth 50'	Stadium: Vale Park; Attendance: 5,541; Referee: Phil Gibbs

24 September 2011 10	Crewe Alexandra	1–1	Port Vale	Crewe
15:00 BST	Moore 72'	Report	Pope 74'	Stadium: Gresty Road; Attendance: 6,613; Referee: Neil Swarbrick

1 October 2011 11	Port Vale	2–0	Rotherham United	Burslem
15:00 BST	Richards 18', 26'	Report		Stadium: Vale Park; Attendance: 4,983; Referee: Paul Tierney

8 October 2011 12	Gillingham	1–1	Port Vale	Gillingham, Kent
15:00 BST	Kedwell 63' (pen.)	Report	Richards 33'	Stadium: Priestfield Stadium; Attendance: 4,676; Referee: Simon Hooper

14 October 2011 13	Port Vale	3–0	Northampton Town	Burslem
19:45 BST	Pope 5'; Griffith 19'; McCombe 26'	Report		Stadium: Vale Park; Attendance: 5,082; Referee: Andrew Madley

22 October 2011 14	Port Vale	0–4	Morecambe	Burslem
15:00 BST		Report	Price 27'; Alessandra 37'; Wilson 87' (pen.); Fleming 90'	Stadium: Vale Park; Attendance: 5,004; Referee: Dean Mohareb

25 October 2011 15	Bristol Rovers	0–3	Port Vale	Bristol
15:00 BST		Report	Richards 19'; Loft 37'; Rigg 85'	Stadium: Memorial Stadium; Attendance: 5,444; Referee: Gary Sutton

29 October 2011 16	Oxford United	2–1	Port Vale	Oxford
15:00 BST	Duberry 11'; Leven 64'	Report	Richards 62'	Stadium: Kassam Stadium; Attendance: 8,027; Referee: Mark Heywood

5 November 2011 17	Port Vale	0–2	Swindon Town	Burslem
15:00 GMT		Report	Magera 25'; Kerrouche 49' (pen.)	Stadium: Vale Park; Attendance: 4,961; Referee: Darren Sheldrake

19 November 2011 18	Cheltenham Town	2–0	Port Vale	Cheltenham
15:00 GMT	Duffy 55' (pen.); Summerfield 69'	Report		Stadium: Whaddon Road; Attendance: 3,165; Referee: Bobby Madley

25 November 2011 19	Port Vale	0–0	Torquay United	Burslem
19:45 GMT		Report		Stadium: Vale Park; Attendance: 5,168; Referee: Keith Stroud

10 December 2011 20	Dagenham & Redbridge	1–2	Port Vale	Dagenham
15:00 GMT	Woodall 23'	Report	Myrie-Williams 24'; Madjo 65'	Stadium: Victoria Road; Attendance: 1,682; Referee: Scott Mathieson

17 December 2011 21	Port Vale	4–0	Aldershot Town	Burslem
15:00 GMT	Madjo 8', 48', 60'; Rigg 83'	Report		Stadium: Vale Park; Attendance: 3,714; Referee: Nigel Miller

26 December 2011 22	Hereford United	1–2	Port Vale	Hereford
13:30 GMT	Barkhuizen 55'	Report	Yates 78'; Richards 84' (pen.)	Stadium: Edgar Street; Attendance: 3,097; Referee: Andy Woolmer

31 December 2011 23	Macclesfield Town	2–1	Port Vale	Macclesfield
13:00 GMT	Tomlinson 37' (og.); Donnelly 71'	Report	Richards 61'	Stadium: Moss Rose; Attendance: 4,214; Referee: Paul Tierney

2 January 2012 24	Port Vale	1–2	Cheltenham Town	Burslem
15:00 GMT	Rigg 79'	Report	Bennett 63'; Smikle 74'	Stadium: Vale Park; Attendance: 4,696; Referee: Andy Haines

7 January 2012 25	Southend United	3–0	Port Vale	Southend-on-Sea
15:00 GMT	Phillips 8'; Dickinson 29'; Owen 55' (og.)	Report		Stadium: Roots Hall; Attendance: 5,269; Referee: Brendan Malone

14 January 2012 26	Port Vale	1–2	AFC Wimbledon	Burslem
15:00 GMT	Richards 31'	Report	Midson 41'; Moore 77'	Stadium: Vale Park; Attendance: 4,326; Referee: Andy Davies

21 January 2012 27	Rotherham United	0–1	Port Vale	Rotherham
15:00 GMT		Report	Richards 57' (pen.)	Stadium: Don Valley Stadium; Attendance: 3,189; Referee: Dean Mohareb

28 January 2012 28	Port Vale	1–0	Plymouth Argyle	Burslem
15:00 GMT	Pope 86'	Report		Stadium: Vale Park; Attendance: 4,375; Referee: Iain Williamson

14 February 2012 29	Bradford City	1–1	Port Vale	Bradford
19:45 GMT	Davies 90+4'	Report	Dodds 38'	Stadium: Valley Parade; Attendance: 12,149; Referee: Tony Harrington

18 February 2012 30	Port Vale	2–1	Gillingham	Burslem
15:00 GMT	Rigg 81'; Richards 90' (pen.)	Report	Whelpdale 45'	Stadium: Vale Park; Attendance: 4,027; Referee: Darren Drysdale

25 February 2012 31	Northampton Town	1–2	Port Vale	Northampton
15:00 GMT	Akinfenwa 81'	Report	McCombe 4'; Rigg 58'	Stadium: Sixfields Stadium; Attendance: 5,803; Referee: Gavin Ward

28 February 2012 32	Port Vale	1–1	Crewe Alexandra	Burslem
19:45 GMT	Artell 48' (og.)	Report	Moore 80'	Stadium: Vale Park; Attendance: 6,356; Referee: Graham Scott

3 March 2012 33	Accrington Stanley	2–2	Port Vale	Accrington
15:00 GMT	Amond 45+1'; Hatfield 88'	Report	McCombe 28'; Shuker 56'	Stadium: Crown Ground; Attendance: 2,093; Referee: Rob Lewis

6 March 2012 34	Port Vale	3–0	Burton Albion	Burslem
19:45 GMT	Richards 43'; Dodds 86', 88'	Report		Stadium: Vale Park; Attendance: 5,197; Referee: Scott Mathieson

10 March 2012 35	Port Vale	1–2	Barnet	Burslem
15:00 GMT	Richards 55'	Report	May 66'; Yiadom 89'	Stadium: Vale Park; Attendance: 5,522; Referee: Geoff Eltringham

17 March 2012 36	Crawley Town	3–2	Port Vale	Crawley
15:00 GMT	Torres 42'; Alexander 69', 82'	Report	Richards 31'; Dodds 57'	Stadium: Broadfield Stadium; Attendance: 2,375; Referee: Mark Brown

20 March 2012 37	Port Vale	1–0	Hereford United	Burslem
19:45 GMT	Richards 85'	Report		Stadium: Vale Park; Attendance: 3,959; Referee: Andy D'Urso

24 March 2012 38	Torquay United	2–1	Port Vale	Torquay
15:00 GMT	Howe 70' (pen.); Jarvis 74'	Report	McCombe 29'	Stadium: Plainmoor; Attendance: 3,136; Referee: Darren Sheldrake

31 March 2012 39	Port Vale	0–1	Dagenham & Redbridge	Burslem
15:00 BST		Report	Spillane 65'	Stadium: Vale Park; Attendance: 4,127; Referee: Lee Collins

6 April 2012 40	Aldershot Town	1–2	Port Vale	Aldershot
15:00 BST	Risser 85'	Report	Dodds 12', 74'	Stadium: Recreation Ground; Attendance: 2,747; Referee: Graham Salisbury

9 April 2012 41	Port Vale	1–0	Macclesfield Town	Burslem
15:00 BST	Yates 82'	Report		Stadium: Vale Park; Attendance: 4,246; Referee: Craig Pawson

14 April 2012 42	Morecambe	0–0	Port Vale	Morecambe
15:00 BST		Report		Stadium: Globe Arena; Attendance: 2,210; Referee: Darren Deadman

17 April 2012 43	Shrewsbury Town	1–0	Port Vale	Shrewsbury
19:45 BST	Richards 55'	Report		Stadium: New Meadow; Attendance: 7,678; Referee: Andrew Madley

21 April 2012 44	Port Vale	1–0	Bristol Rovers	Burslem
15:00 BST	Richards 23'	Report		Stadium: Vale Park; Attendance: 4,076; Referee: Dean Mohareb

28 April 2012 45	Swindon Town	5–0	Port Vale	Swindon
15:00 BST	Ritchie 38'; Benson 51', 64'; Flint 66'; Connell 85'	Report		Stadium: County Ground; Attendance: 12,864; Referee: David Phillips

5 May 2012 46	Port Vale	3–0	Oxford United	Burslem
15:00 BST	Richards 41'; Rigg 69'; Williamson 90+2'	Report		Stadium: Vale Park; Attendance: 5,621; Referee: Darren Drysdale

=== FA Cup ===
12 November 2011 R1	Port Vale	0–0	Grimsby Town	Burslem
15:00 GMT		Report		Stadium: Vale Park; Attendance: 4,450; Referee: Jeremy Simpson

22 November 2011 Replay	Grimsby Town	1–0	Port Vale	Cleethorpes
15:00 GMT	Makofo 59'	Report		Stadium: Blundell Park; Attendance: 1,906; Referee: Jock Waugh

=== League Cup ===
9 August 2011 R1	Port Vale	2–4	Huddersfield Town	Burslem
19:45 BST	Roberts 24'; Loft 83' (pen.)	Report	Novak 29', 38'; Hunt 58'; Roberts 67'	Stadium: Vale Park; Attendance: 3,014; Referee: Andy Woolmer

=== Football League Trophy ===
30 August 2011 R1	Tranmere Rovers	1–1 (a.e.t.) (4–2 p)	Port Vale	Prenton
19:00 BST	Taylor 88'	Report	Taylor 50'	Stadium: Prenton Park; Attendance: 2,546; Referee: Mark Heywood
	Penalties
	Labadie (penalty scored); Power (penalty scored); Welsh (penalty missed); Weir (penalty scored); Taylor (penalty scored)		Roberts (penalty missed); Martin (penalty scored); Pope (penalty missed); McDonald (penalty scored)

== Squad statistics ==
=== Appearances and goals ===
Key to positions: GK – Goalkeeper; DF – Defender; MF – Midfielder; FW – Forward

No.	Pos	Nat	Player	Total		EFL League Two		FA Cup		League Cup		EFL Trophy	
No.	Pos	Nat	Player	Apps	Goals	Apps	Goals	Apps	Goals	Apps	Goals	Apps	Goals
1	GK	(England) ENG	Chris Martin	11	0	8	0	1	0	1	0	1	0
2	DF	(England) ENG	Adam Yates	42	2	38	2	2	0	1	0	1	0
3	MF	(England) ENG	Rob Taylor	34	3	31	2	2	0	0	0	1	1
4	MF	(Montserrat) MSR	Anthony Griffith	47	1	43	1	2	0	1	0	1	0
5	DF	(England) ENG	John McCombe	44	4	40	4	2	0	1	0	1	0
6	DF	(Wales) WAL	Gareth Owen	25	0	24	0	0	0	0	0	1	0
7	MF	(England) ENG	Doug Loft	46	5	44	4	1	0	1	1	0	0
8	MF	(England) ENG	Louis Dodds	38	8	35	8	2	0	0	0	1	0
9	FW	(England) ENG	Marc Richards	36	17	36	17	0	0	0	0	0	0
10	MF	(England) ENG	Ryan Burge	2	0	0	0	0	0	1	0	1	0
11	FW	(England) ENG	Tom Pope	45	5	41	5	2	0	1	0	1	0
12	GK	(England) ENG	Stuart Tomlinson	39	0	38	0	1	0	0	0	0	0
14	MF	(England) ENG	Paul Marshall	15	0	15	0	0	0	0	0	0	0
15	DF	(England) ENG	Lee Collins	20	0	16	0	2	0	1	0	1	0
16	MF	(Wales) WAL	Lewis Haldane	5	0	3	0	0	0	1	0	1	0
17	MF	(England) ENG	Sean Rigg	45	10	42	10	2	0	1	0	0	0
18	MF	(Egypt) EGY	Sam Morsy	28	1	26	1	2	0	0	0	0	0
19	FW	(England) ENG	Ben Williamson	37	3	35	3	0	0	1	0	1	0
20	MF	(England) ENG	Chris Shuker	16	1	16	1	0	0	0	0	0	0
21	DF	(England) ENG	Kingsley James	5	0	5	0	0	0	0	0	0	0
22	DF	(England) ENG	Phil Roe	3	0	2	0	1	0	0	0	0	0
24	GK	(England) ENG	Sam Johnson	0	0	0	0	0	0	0	0	0	0
25	DF	(England) ENG	Clayton McDonald	33	0	30	0	1	0	1	0	1	0
26	DF	(England) ENG	Joe Davis	8	0	8	0	0	0	0	0	0	0
32	MF	(England) ENG	Ryan Lloyd	2	0	2	0	0	0	0	0	0	0
33	MF	(England) ENG	Dominic Thorley	0	0	0	0	0	0	0	0	0	0
Players who featured but departed the club during the season:
14	MF	(England) ENG	Gary Roberts	15	5	11	4	2	0	1	1	1	0
20	DF	(England) ENG	Mike Green	5	0	4	0	0	0	1	0	0	0
23	DF	(England) ENG	Charlie Raglan	0	0	0	0	0	0	0	0	0	0
27	MF	(Northern Ireland) NIR	Andrew Little	7	0	7	0	0	0	0	0	0	0
28	DF	(England) ENG	Liam Chilvers	12	0	12	0	0	0	0	0	0	0
29	DF	(England) ENG	Rob Kozluk	7	0	6	0	1	0	0	0	0	0
34	DF	(Republic of Ireland) IRL	Shane O'Connor	0	0	0	0	0	0	0	0	0	0
35	FW	(Cameroon) CMR	Guy Madjo	6	4	6	4	0	0	0	0	0	0
36	MF	(England) ENG	Jennison Myrie-Williams	6	1	6	1	0	0	0	0	0	0

=== Top scorers ===
Place	Position	Nation	Number	Name	League Two	FA Cup	League Cup	Football League Trophy	Total
1	FW	England	9	Marc Richards	17	0	0	0	17
2	MF	England	17	Sean Rigg	10	0	0	0	10
3	MF	England	8	Louis Dodds	8	0	0	0	8
=	MF	England	7	Doug Loft	4	0	1	0	5
=	FW	England	11	Tom Pope	5	0	0	0	5
=	MF	England	14	Gary Roberts	4	0	1	0	5
7	FW	Cameroon	35	Guy Madjo	4	0	0	0	4
=	DF	England	5	John McCombe	4	0	0	0	4
9	MF	England	3	Rob Taylor	2	0	0	1	3
=	FW	England	19	Ben Williamson	3	0	0	0	3
11	DF	England	2	Adam Yates	2	0	0	0	2
12	MF	Montserrat	4	Anthony Griffith	1	0	0	0	1
=	MF	Egypt	18	Sam Morsy	1	0	0	0	1
=	MF	England	36	Jennison Myrie-Williams	1	0	0	0	1
=	MF	England	20	Chris Shuker	1	0	0	0	1
n/a	n/a	n/a	n/a	Own goals	1	0	0	0	1
				TOTALS	65	0	2	1	68

=== Disciplinary record ===
Number	Nation	Position	Name	League Two		FA Cup		League Cup		League Trophy		Total	
Number	Nation	Position	Name	Yellow card	Red card	Yellow card	Red card	Yellow card	Red card	Yellow card	Red card	Yellow card	Red card
25	England	DF	Clayton McDonald	8	2	0	0	0	0	1	0	9	2
26	England	DF	Joe Davis	3	1	0	0	0	0	0	0	3	1
9	England	FW	Marc Richards	3	1	0	0	0	0	0	0	3	1
4	Montserrat	MF	Anthony Griffith	11	0	0	0	0	0	0	0	11	0
7	England	MF	Doug Loft	7	0	0	0	0	0	0	0	7	0
8	England	MF	Louis Dodds	5	0	0	0	0	0	0	0	5	0
18	Egypt	MF	Sam Morsy	5	0	0	0	0	0	0	0	5	0
14	England	MF	Gary Roberts	5	0	0	0	0	0	0	0	5	0
2	England	DF	Adam Yates	5	0	0	0	0	0	0	0	5	0
28	England	DF	Liam Chilvers	4	0	0	0	0	0	0	0	4	0
5	England	DF	John McCombe	3	0	0	0	0	0	1	0	4	0
6	Wales	DF	Gareth Owen	4	0	0	0	0	0	0	0	4	0
11	England	FW	Tom Pope	4	0	0	0	0	0	0	0	4	0
15	England	DF	Lee Collins	2	0	0	0	0	0	1	0	3	0
17	England	MF	Sean Rigg	3	0	0	0	0	0	0	0	3	0
3	England	MF	Rob Taylor	3	0	0	0	0	0	0	0	3	0
12	England	GK	Stuart Tomlinson	2	0	0	0	0	0	0	0	2	0
29	England	DF	Rob Kozluk	1	0	0	0	0	0	0	0	1	0
29	England	MF	Paul Marshall	1	0	0	0	0	0	0	0	1	0
22	England	DF	Phil Roe	1	0	0	0	0	0	0	0	1	0
20	England	MF	Chris Shuker	1	0	0	0	0	0	0	0	1	0
			TOTALS	79	4	0	0	0	0	3	0	82	4

Sourced from Soccerway.

== Awards ==
End of Season Awards	Winner
Player of the Year	Doug Loft
Away Travel Player of the Year	Doug Loft
Players' Player of the Year	Doug Loft
Young Player of the Year	Joe Davis
Youth Player of the Year	Joe Davis

== Transfers ==
=== Transfers in ===
Date from	Position	Nationality	Name	From	Fee	Ref.
28 June 2011	MF	ENG	Ryan Burge	Hyde	Undisclosed	
1 July 2011	DF	ENG	Mike Green	AFC Totton	Free transfer	
1 July 2011	DF	ENG	Kingsley James	Sheffield United	Free transfer	
1 July 2011	DF	ENG	Clayton McDonald	Walsall	Free transfer	
1 July 2011	DF	ENG	Phil Roe	Sheffield United	Free transfer	
2 August 2011	FW	ENG	Tom Pope	Rotherham United	Free transfer	
22 September 2011	DF	ENG	Rob Kozluk	Sheffield United	N/A	
14 February 2012	MF	ENG	Chris Shuker	Morecambe	N/A	
14 February 2012	MF	ENG	Paul Marshall	Droylsden	N/A	
21 May 2012	FW	ENG	Ben Williamson	Hyde	N/A	

=== Transfers out ===
Date from	Position	Nationality	Name	To	Fee	Ref.
1 June 2011	DF	ENG	Kris Taylor	Darlington	Free transfer	
9 June 2011	DF	BVI	Matt Bell	Mansfield Town	Free transfer	
29 June 2011	DF	ENG	Ritchie Sutton	Mansfield Town	Free transfer	
28 July 2011	FW	ENG	Justin Richards	Burton Albion	Free transfer	
17 November 2011	DF	ENG	Mike Green	Eastleigh	Free transfer	
23 December 2011	DF	ENG	Rob Kozluk	Bradford City	Free transfer	
30 December 2011	MF	ENG	Gary Roberts	Mansfield Town	Free transfer	
26 April 2012	DF	ENG	Charlie Raglan	Hinckley United	Released	
8 May 2012	GK	ENG	Chris Martin	Ilkeston	Released	
8 May 2012	DF	ENG	Phil Roe	Matlock Town	Released	
8 May 2012	MF	ENG	Paul Marshall	FC Halifax Town	Released	
8 May 2012	DF	ENG	Lee Collins	Barnsley	£50,000	
19 May 2012	MF	MSR	Anthony Griffith	Leyton Orient	Free transfer	
22 May 2012	FW	ENG	Sean Rigg	Oxford United	Free transfer	
23 May 2012	FW	ENG	Marc Richards	Chesterfield	Free transfer	
3 July 2012	GK	ENG	Stuart Tomlinson	Burton Albion	Released	

=== Loans in ===
Start date	Position	Nationality	Name	From	End date	Ref.
28 June 2011	FW	ENG	Ben Williamson	Hyde	End of season	
31 August 2011	MF	NIR	Andrew Little	(Scotland) Rangers	24 October 2011	
22 September 2011	DF	ENG	Liam Chilvers	Notts County	24 December 2011	
24 November 2011	DF	IRL	Shane O'Connor	Ipswich Town	3 January 2012	
24 November 2011	FW	CMR	Guy Madjo	Stevenage	3 January 2012	
24 November 2011	MF	ENG	Jennison Myrie-Williams	Stevenage	3 January 2012	

=== Loans out ===
Start date	Position	Nationality	Name	To	End date	Ref.
29 August 2011	GK	ENG	Sam Johnson	Stafford Rangers	29 October 2011	
30 September 2011	MF	ENG	Charlie Raglan	Hinckley United	5 December 2011	
20 October 2011	DF	ENG	Mike Green	Eastleigh	17 November 2011	
20 October 2011	DF	ENG	Kingsley James	Chasetown	20 November 2011	
15 March 2012	DF	ENG	Lee Collins	Barnsley	End of season	
