= Clayton McDonald =

English footballer (born 1988)

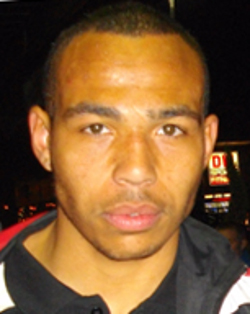
- McDonald in 2011

Personal information
- Full name: Clayton Rodney McDonald
- Date of birth: 26 December 1988 (age 37)
- Place of birth: Liverpool, England
- Height: 6 ft 6 in (1.98 m)
- Position: Defender

Youth career
- 1999–2008: Manchester City

Senior career*
Years	Team	Apps	(Gls)
2008–2009	Manchester City	0	(0)
2008	→ Macclesfield Town (loan)	2	(0)
2009	→ Chesterfield (loan)	2	(0)
2009	→ Walsall (loan)	26	(1)
2009–2011	Walsall	14	(0)
2011–2013	Port Vale	52	(0)
2013	→ Bristol Rovers (loan)	6	(0)
2013–2014	Grimsby Town	17	(1)
2014	Tranmere Rovers	1	(0)
2014	Southport	12	(0)
2015	Redditch United		
2015–2016	Worcester City	7	(0)
2015–2016	→ Corby Town (loan)	12	(1)
2016	Redditch United	14	(0)
2016–2017	Altrincham	3	(0)
2017	Droylsden		
2017–2020	Nantwich Town	34	(1)
2018	→ Whitchurch Alport (dual)		
- * Club domestic league appearances and goals

Clayton Rodney McDonald (born 26 December 1988) is an English former professional footballer who played as a defender.

He graduated from the Manchester City youth academy in 2008. He spent the 2008–09 season on loan at League Two sides Macclesfield Town and Chesterfield. He spent the start of the 2009–10 season on loan at Walsall before the deal was made permanent in December 2009. At the end of the 2010–11 campaign, he was released by the club, at which point he signed with Port Vale. He joined Bristol Rovers on loan in January 2013. Port Vale secured promotion out of League Two in 2012–13. He signed with Grimsby Town in July 2013 before briefly joining Tranmere Rovers a year later. He signed with Southport in September 2014 and moved to Redditch United in February 2015 and then Worcester City in June 2015. He was loaned out to Corby Town in the 2015–16 season before rejoining Redditch United in June 2016. He signed with Altrincham in December 2016 and then switched to Droylsden the following month. He signed with Nantwich Town for the 2017–18 season and also signed with Whitchurch Alport on dual registration forms in September 2018.

== Career ==
=== Manchester City ===
A graduate of the Manchester City youth set-up, McDonald signed his first professional contract with Manchester City. He then turned professional in 2008. He signed on loan for Macclesfield Town in August 2008, and made his competitive debut in a 2–0 defeat at Accrington Stanley on 23 August. He was substituted in the 70th minute after picking up an injury. Macclesfield manager Keith Alexander commented that "He did a good job for us, I was delighted with his performance" and "for a young lad to come in and do so well, it augurs well for the future." Alexander stated they could extend the loan, but both parties agreed it would be best if he returned to his parent club. McDonald signed on loan for Chesterfield on transfer deadline day, 2 February 2009, initially on a one-month emergency loan.

=== Walsall ===
McDonald signed a one-month loan deal with Walsall in September 2009. His father previously played for the club. Manager Chris Hutchings said "he's a talented young lad. He's strong in the air, tackles well and can play." He impressed Hutchings, who twice had the loan extended for an extra month, before he signed for Walsall on a permanent basis in December 2009, following the player's release from Manchester City. The decision to leave City for Walsall won him praise from new teammate Troy Deeney. He played 27 games in the 2009–10 campaign, and picked up his first senior goal on 16 February, in a 2–1 victory over Leeds United at Elland Road. He was more of a bit-part player in Walsall's 2010–11 season, making just 17 appearances. In April 2011, he picked up a shoulder injury that would keep him out of action for the rest of the season.

=== Port Vale ===
After being told he would not be retained by the "Saddlers", he was due to sign a contract at Port Vale in June 2011, but failed a medical due to a shoulder injury. Regardless of this he signed a six-month deal with the club the following month. He aimed to regain his fitness, win a first-team place, and thereby earn a longer stay at Vale Park. He quickly managed to achieve the first two of these goals by October, as he started nine of Vale's first 14 games of the season. He achieved the third target in December, signing a contract lasting until the end of the 2011–12 season, having already made 18 appearances in league and cup. However, his next contribution to Vale's campaign would be his 64th-minute sending off at Southend United, following a second bookable offence. He returned to the first-team after serving his suspension but received his second red card of the campaign on 17 March after receiving a second yellow card 47 minutes into a defeat at Crawley Town. He played 31 games for the "Valiants" with a court case hanging over his head. However, boss Micky Adams said that there would be "no favours" for the player for proving his innocence and insisted that his decision on whether or not to offer a contract to McDonald would be based on the footballing ability he had shown throughout the campaign. Though suspensions and court appearances limited his contribution to the campaign, he still managed to post 33 first-team appearances in 2011–12. He accepted Adams' offer of a new one-year contract in May 2012; Adams stated, "I'm obviously pleased Clayton has agreed to sign. He has done well since he has been at the club and has the potential to do even better. He was under a lot of stress with everything that was going on last season, but now he can get his mind clear and concentrate totally on football."

After David Artell left the club, Gareth Owen picked up an injury and Joe Davis suffered a loss of form, McDonald managed to build a solid centre-back partnership with John McCombe at the start of the 2012–13 campaign, but was warned to lose weight and improve his fitness by manager Micky Adams. He scored his first goal for the club in a 3–2 win against Forest Green Rovers at The New Lawn on 3 November, in the first round of the FA Cup; during the match he also made a goal-line clearance with the score at 2–2. Speaking after the game, McDonald said "I'm just trying to pay back the fans and the manager for all their support in the past with performances on the pitch. Hopefully it's the first of many... hopefully I can catch Tom Pope up. The support they have given me has meant a lot to me. They are a top bunch of people, it's a top area." However, the arrival of new signings Darren Purse and Liam Chilvers displaced McDonald from the first-team picture. On 21 January, he joined Bristol Rovers on loan until the end of the season, as cover for the injured Garry Kenneth. The "Pirates" were then bottom of the English Football League, and manager John Ward said that McDonald was "prepared to come down for the cause [of avoiding relegation] and that's a really big plus for me." However, McDonald remained on the bench as the "Gas" lost only three of their next 15 games, and had to wait until Tom Parkes received a suspension before he finally started a game for the club on 6 April, in a 1–0 win at the Memorial Stadium that saw Rovers climb into 11th place. He returned to Vale in time to see the club secure promotion with a third-place finish. He was not offered a new contract at the end of the season and was released as a free agent.

=== Grimsby Town ===
McDonald signed a one-year contract with Grimsby Town of the Conference Premier in July 2013. On 19 November, McDonald scored his first goal for the "Mariners" by providing the winner in a 2–1 victory over local rivals Scunthorpe United in the FA Cup first round. He was a key first-team player until losing his place due to injury. He played 17 league games during the 2013–14 campaign as Grimsby secured a play-off spot, losing to Gateshead at the semi-final stage. He was released by manager Paul Hurst in May 2014.

=== Tranmere Rovers ===
In August 2014, McDonald joined newly relegated League Two club Tranmere Rovers on non-contract terms as manager Rob Edwards was impressed by his ability but not convinced about his fitness levels. However, he left the club later in the month after making just one first-team appearance.

=== Non-League ===
McDonald signed for Martin Foyle's Southport of the Conference Premier in September 2014. After playing in 13 games on a non-contract basis McDonald was released on 28 December 2014. He joined Southern League side Redditch United in February 2015. The next month Kidderminster Harriers manager Gary Whild tried to sign him. However, McDonald chose to stay with Redditch. The "Reds" missed out on the play-offs in the 2014–15 season after finishing one point and one place behind St Neots Town.

He signed with Worcester City of the National League North in June 2015. He joined league rivals Corby Town on a three-month loan deal in October. He captained Corby during his loan spell. He rejoined Redditch United in June 2016 after the club's supporters agree to pay his wages; he cited manager Darren Byfield and the enthusiasm of the supporters as the two major factors in his decision to join the club. He joined National League North side Altrincham in December 2016. He moved onto Northern Premier League Division One North club Droylsden the following month. The "Bloods" finished 13th in the 2016–17 season.

McDonald joined Northern Premier League Premier Division side Nantwich Town in the summer of 2017. The "Dabbers" posted a 16th-place finish in the 2017–18 season. On 16 September 2018, he joined North West Counties League Division One club Whitchurch Alport on dual registration terms. As a result of the COVID-19 pandemic in England, the 2019–20 season was formally abandoned on 26 March, with all results from the season being expunged. The 2020–21 season was also curtailed due to the ongoing pandemic.

== Personal life ==
=== Family ===
His father, Rod, was previously a professional footballer who played for Walsall, Partick Thistle, Chester City, and numerous other non-League clubs. His younger brother, also named Rod, is also a professional footballer and played for Stoke City and Oldham Athletic after leaving the Manchester City Academy in 2005.

=== 2012 acquittal of rape charge ===
On 20 April 2012, after a trial at the Crown Court at Caernarfon before His Honour Judge Merfyn Hughes QC and a jury, McDonald was acquitted of the rape of a woman at a Premier Inn in Rhuddlan on 30 May. His co-defendant and former Manchester City teammate, Ched Evans, was convicted of the charge and sentenced to five years imprisonment. McDonald's lawyer stated after his acquittal that: "Clayton McDonald has maintained his innocence from the start and is relieved at his verdict. However, he is very upset and disappointed regarding the verdict given to his lifelong friend, Ched Evans, whom he will continue to support in any way possible." Evans went on to have his conviction quashed and was found not guilty at his retrial in October 2016.

== Career statistics ==
As of match played 22 September 2020.

Appearances and goals by club, season and competition
Club	Season	League			FA Cup		League Cup		Other		Total	
Club	Season	Division	Apps	Goals	Apps	Goals	Apps	Goals	Apps	Goals	Apps	Goals
Manchester City	2008–09	Premier League	0	0	0	0	0	0	0	0	0	0
Manchester City	2009–10	Premier League	0	0	0	0	0	0	0	0	0	0
Manchester City	Total		0	0	0	0	0	0	0	0	0	0
Macclesfield Town (loan)	2008–09	League Two	2	0	—		—		—		2	0
Chesterfield (loan)	2008–09	League Two	2	0	—		—		—		2	0
Walsall	2009–10	League One	26	1	—		—		1 (Note: Appearance(s) in the Football League Trophy)	0	27	1
Walsall	2010–11	League One	14	0	1	0	1	0	1	0	17	0
Walsall	Total		40	1	1	0	1	0	2	0	44	1
Port Vale	2011–12	League Two	30	0	1	0	1	0	1	0	33	0
Port Vale	2012–13	League Two	22	0	2	1	1	0	1	0	26	1
Port Vale	Total		52	0	3	1	2	0	2	0	59	1
Bristol Rovers (loan)	2012–13	League Two	6	0	—		—		—		6	0
Grimsby Town	2013–14	Conference Premier	17	1	3	1	—		3 (Note: Appearance(s) in the play-offs.)	0	23 (Note: Appearance(s) in the FA Trophy not known.)	2
Tranmere Rovers	2014–15	League Two	1	0	—		—		—		1	0
Southport	2014–15	Conference Premier	12	0	1	0	—		3 (Note: 2 appearances in the FA Trophy, 1 appearance in the Lancashire Senior Cup.)	0	16	0
Worcester City	2015–16	National League North	7	0	0	0	—		0	0	7	0
Corby Town (loan)	2015–16	National League North	12	1	0	0	—		1 (Note: Appearance(s) in the FA Trophy.)	0	13	1
Redditch United (loan)	2015–16	Southern League; Premier Division	14	0	1	1	—		3 (Note: 2 appearances in the FA Trophy and 1 appearance in the Birmingham Senior Cup.)	0	18	1
Altrincham	2016–17	National League North	3	0	0	0	—		0	0	3	0
Nantwich Town	2017–18	Northern Premier League; Premier Division	25	1	0	0	—		8	0	33	1
Nantwich Town	2018–19	Northern Premier League; Premier Division	5	0	0	0	—		0	0	5	0
Nantwich Town	2019–20	Northern Premier League; Premier Division	4	0	4	0	—		3	0	11	0
Nantwich Town	2020–21	Northern Premier League; Premier Division	0	0	1	0	—		0	0	1	0
Nantwich Town	Total		34	1	5	0	0	0	11	0	50	1
Career total (Note: Full statistics at Redditch United, Droylsden and Whitchurch Alport not known.)			202	4	14	3	3	0	25	0	244	7

== Honours ==
Port Vale

- Football League Two third-place promotion: 2012–13
