= Paul Marshall (footballer) =

English footballer (born 1989)

Personal information
- Full name: Paul Anthony Marshall
- Date of birth: 9 July 1989 (age 37)
- Place of birth: Gorton, England
- Height: 1.85 m (6 ft 1 in)
- Position: Midfielder

Youth career
- 2001–2008: Manchester City

Senior career*
Years	Team	Apps	(Gls)
2008–2010	Manchester City	0	(0)
2009	→ Blackpool (loan)	2	(0)
2009	→ Port Vale (loan)	13	(1)
2010	→ Aberdeen (loan)	9	(0)
2010–2011	Walsall	18	(1)
2011	Rochdale	1	(0)
2011–2012	Droylsden	11	(1)
2012	Port Vale	15	(0)
2012–2013	FC Halifax Town	19	(1)
2013	Stockport County	11	(1)
2013–2015	FC Halifax Town	74	(5)
2015–2016	Bradford Park Avenue	12	(0)
2016–2017	Alfreton Town	21	(1)
2017–2019	Curzon Ashton	34	(0)
2019	Buxton	0	(0)
2019	Mossley	6	(0)
2021	Radcliffe	1	(0)
2021–2022	Workington	6	(1)
Total		246	(11)

International career
2009	England U20	3	(0)

Managerial career
- 2022–2024: Cheadle Town
- 2024–2026: West Didsbury & Chorlton
- * Club domestic league appearances and goals

Paul Anthony Marshall (born 9 July 1989) is an English professional football manager and former footballer who played in the English Football League.

As a player, he was a midfielder, and he began his career with Manchester City; after several years in the youth ranks, he turned professional with the club in 2008. He had loan spells with Blackpool, Port Vale, and Aberdeen; before transferring to Walsall for the 2010–11 season. After leaving Walsall, he signed with Rochdale and then non-League Droylsden. He re-joined Port Vale on non-contract terms in February 2012 before signing with FC Halifax Town five months later. He signed with Stockport County in 2013 before returning to Halifax. He later had spells with Bradford Park Avenue, Alfreton Town and Curzon Ashton. He joined Buxton in July 2019 and moved to Mossley later in the year. He joined Radcliffe in July 2021 and moved to Workington two months later.

He began his management career with Cheadle Town in May 2022, winning the North West Counties League Division One South play-offs in 2023. He took charge at West Didsbury & Chorlton in May 2024, a post a held until March 2026.

== Playing career ==
Marshall is a product of the Manchester City youth academy, which he joined when he was 11. In the 2006–07 season, he made his debut for the club's reserve side in the Premier Reserve League North, scoring four goals in eight starts. He also scored the final goal as City beat Manchester United 3–1 in the final of the Manchester Senior Cup. At the end of the 2006–07 season, Marshall signed his first professional contract with Manchester City.

In the 2008–09 season, he was given the squad number 46 and became a regular in the reserve team. After scoring for the reserves and being named man of the match in their 3–0 victory over Newcastle United Reserves, on 29 January 2009, he signed for Championship club Blackpool on loan, initially for one month until 28 February, with the possibility of extending it until the end of the season. Blackpool's assistant manager, Steve Thompson, said of Marshall: "We have been watching Paul for a few weeks now and every time we have seen him play he has impressed us. He has a sweet left foot and has an excellent range of passing, he has a presence in midfield and I'm sure he will do well for us."

Marshall said of the move: "Playing in the Championship will be good experience for me because it will also show Mark Hughes that I can do it in this league. If I do well here, he may think that I will be good enough for the Premiership when I go back." His debut for the "Seasiders" on 31 January against Crystal Palace at Selhurst Park lasted just five minutes, after goalkeeper Paul Rachubka was sent off three minutes into the match. Marshall was then brought off in a tactical substitution so that Matt Gilks could replace Rachubka in goal. His second appearance was as an 82-minute substitute against Doncaster Rovers on 7 February, after which he returned to Manchester.

In March 2009, Marshall was sent out on loan to Port Vale, and made his debut the following day in the goalless draw at Bournemouth. He scored his first senior goal on 28 March, with a long-range free kick in a 2–1 reverse at Chesterfield. He played a total of 13 games for the club. Marshall joined Scottish team Aberdeen on loan on 2 January 2010, and made his Scottish debut in a 1–0 win over Dundee United on the same day, claiming the assist for Charlie Mulgrew's goal. He returned to Manchester after a further eight appearances for the club.

Marshall signed with Walsall in June 2010, after his friend Clayton McDonald recommended the club. After 22 appearances he was released from the club twelve months later, as was McDonald. In July 2011, he had a trial spell at Rochdale, and impressed enough to earn an extended stay at the club. He was an 82nd-minute substitute for Joe Thompson in a goalless draw with Carlisle United at Spotland on 16 August; his only appearance for the club. He then spent a brief spell with Droylsden in the Conference North, also on non-contract terms. He began training with former club Port Vale in January 2012, and joined on non-contract terms on 14 February. He went on to play 15 games for the "Valiants" in 2011–12, but was not offered a new contract.

He signed with Conference North club FC Halifax Town in July 2012. He moved up a division when he joined Stockport County in February 2013, again on non-contract terms. He scored his first goal for the club, a 30 yards (27 m) strike, in a 4–1 defeat to Mansfield Town at Field Mill. He played 11 games as County were relegated out of the Conference National in 2012–13. After being released from Stockport, he then returned to the Halifax on the back of their promotion to the Conference National. He made 39 appearances in the 2013–14 campaign, helping the club to qualify for the play-off semi-finals, where they were beaten by Cambridge United. He remained a key player in the 2014–15 campaign, scoring three goals in 42 appearances.

He signed with National League North side Bradford Park Avenue in May 2015. Avenue finished 14th in the 2015–16 campaign. He signed with Nicky Law's Alfreton Town in October 2016. He played 25 games across the 2016–17 season as the "Reds" posted an 18th-place finish in the National League North. Marshall joined Curzon Ashton in May 2017. He made 24 appearances across the 2017–18 campaign as the "Nash" posted an 18th-place finish in the National League North, and was limited to just ten appearances in the 2018–19 season.

On 31 July 2019, Marshall joined Northern Premier League Premier Division club Buxton on a non-contract basis. He moved on to Northern Premier League Division One North West side Mossley later in the year. He made just eight starts before the 2019–20 season was formally abandoned on 26 March due to the COVID-19 pandemic in England.

On 19 July 2021, Marshall signed for Northern Premier League Premier Division club Radcliffe. Marshall made one start for Radcliffe before signing for Northern Premier League Division One West side Workington on a free transfer in September 2021.

== International career ==
Although born in England, Marshall has represented Ireland under 19's. He was called up to the England under-20 team for the 2009 FIFA U-20 World Cup in Egypt.

== Management career ==
On 10 May 2022, Marshall was named as the manager of North West Counties League Division One South club Cheadle Town. He led the club to promotion via the play-offs at the end of the 2022–23 season. He left the club on 19 April 2024.

On 11 May 2024, Marshall was appointed as manager of North West Counties League Premier Division club West Didsbury & Chorlton. The club finished fifth in the 2024–25 campaign and were beaten by Lower Breck in the play-off semi-finals. He resigned due to personal reasons on 2 March 2026.

== Personal life ==
In July 2017, Marshall and two other men pleaded guilty to conspiracy to commit criminal damage for their part in two events in March and April 2015 which followed a dispute over parking tickets at a property in Moss Side.

== Career statistics ==
Appearances and goals by club, season and competition
Season	Club	League			National cup (Note: Includes FA Cup, Scottish Cup)		League cup (Note: Includes Football League Cup, Scottish League Cup)		Other		Total	
Season	Club	Division	Apps	Goals	Apps	Goals	Apps	Goals	Apps	Goals	Apps	Goals
Manchester City	2008–09	Premier League	0	0	0	0	0	0	0	0	0	0
Manchester City	2009–10	Premier League	0	0	0	0	0	0	—		0	0
Manchester City	Total		0	0	0	0	0	0	0	0	0	0
Blackpool (loan)	2008–09	Championship	2	0	—		—		—		2	0
Port Vale (loan)	2008–09	League Two	13	1	—		—		—		13	1
Aberdeen (loan)	2009–10	Scottish Premier League	9	0	1	0	—		—		10	0
Walsall	2010–11	League One	18	1	2	0	1	0	1 (Note: Appearance in the Football League Trophy)	0	22	1
Rochdale	2011–12	League One	1	0	0	0	0	0	0	0	1	0
Droylsden	2011–12	Conference North	11	1	0	0	—		2 (Note: Appearances in the FA Trophy)	0	13	1
Port Vale	2011–12	League Two	15	0	—		—		—		15	0
FC Halifax Town	2012–13	Conference North	19	1	2	0	—		3	0	24	1
Stockport County	2012–13	Conference National	11	1	0	0	—		0	0	11	1
FC Halifax Town	2013–14	Conference Premier	38	2	1	0	—		1	0	40	2
FC Halifax Town	2014–15	Conference Premier	36	3	3	0	—		3	0	42	3
FC Halifax Town	Total		74	5	4	0	0	0	4	0	80	5
Bradford Park Avenue	2015–16	National League North	12	0	0	0	—		2	0	14	0
Alfreton Town	2016–17	National League North	21	1	3	0	—		1	0	25	1
Curzon Ashton	2017–18	National League North	24	0	0	0	—		0	0	24	0
Curzon Ashton	2018–19	National League North	10	0	0	0	—		0	0	10	0
Curzon Ashton	Total		34	0	0	0	0	0	0	0	34	0
Buxton	2019–20	Northern Premier League; Premier Division	0	0	0	0	0	0	0	0	0	0
Mossley	2019–20	Northern Premier League; Division One North West	6	0	1	0	1	0	0	0	8	0
Radcliffe	2021–22	Northern Premier League; Premier Division	1	0	0	0	0	0	0	0	1	0
Workington	2021–22	Northern Premier League; West Division	6	1	0	0	0	0	0	0	6	1
Career total (Note: Statistics for Buxton not recorded.)			253	12	13	0	2	0	13	0	281	12

== Honours ==
Cheadle Town

- North West Counties League play-offs: 2022–23
