= Mike Green (footballer, born May 1989) =

English footballer

Michael Green
Personal information
- Full name: Michael James Green
- Date of birth: 12 May 1989 (age 37)
- Place of birth: Southampton, England
- Height: 6 ft 0 in (1.83 m)
- Position: Full back

Youth career
- Brockenhurst
- Christchurch

Senior career*
| Years | Team | Apps | (Gls) |
| 2009 | Eastleigh | 0 | (0) |
| 2009–2011 | Totton | 68 | (1) |
| 2011 | Port Vale | 4 | (0) |
| 2011 | → Eastleigh (loan) | 5 | (1) |
| 2011–2021 | Eastleigh | 318 | (5) |
| 2021 | Havant & Waterlooville | 8 | (0) |
| 2022 | Dorchester Town | 1 | (0) |
| 2022 | Lymington Town | 4 | (0) |
| 2022 | Totton | 2 | (0) |
| Total | | 410 | (7) |
- * Club domestic league appearances and goals

Michael James Green (born 12 May 1989) is an English former professional footballer who played as a full back.

He played non-League football for Brockenhurst, Christchurch, Eastleigh, and Totton before he was signed to Port Vale in July 2011. With Totton, he won the Southern League Division One South & West in 2010–11 and twice lifted the Hampshire Senior Cup. He was loaned back to Eastleigh in October 2011, and the deal was made permanent a month later. He helped the club to the Conference South title in 2013–14. He left the club briefly in February 2017 before returning following a change in management. He ended his ten-year stay at Eastleigh and moved on to Havant & Waterlooville in June 2021. He had spells with Dorchester Town, Lymington Town and Totton in 2022.

== Career ==
=== Early career ===
Green began his career with Brockenhurst and Christchurch, working under Graham Kemp, before moving to Conference South club Eastleigh for a trial in summer 2009. He won a contract at the club after impressing in pre-season friendlies and the South West Challenge Cup, but did not play a competitive game for the club. Instead he joined Totton on loan in August 2009 to gain experience, before the deal was later made permanent for a £7,500 fee.

He played 46 games in 2009–10, scoring once against Bishop's Cleeve and winning two man of the match awards, as Totton finished second in the Southern League Division One South & West. He also played in the defeat to Cirencester Town in the play-off semi-finals. The 2010–11 campaign would be one of the most successful in the club's history, as they topped the division after finishing just two points ahead of Sholing. In May 2011 he won the Hampshire Senior Cup with Totton, following a 3–1 victory over Sholing at St Mary's Stadium.

=== Port Vale ===
Green had trials with Reading, Millwall, and Wycombe Wanderers, before he was signed as a 22-year-old by Micky Adams' League Two side Port Vale in July 2011. He described the move into professional football as "a dream come true". He made his debut on the opening day of the 2011–12 season, as Vale drew 2–2 with Crawley Town at Vale Park. He played four further games, before he returned to Eastleigh on a one-month emergency loan deal on 20 October.

=== Eastleigh ===
He made his Eastleigh debut on 22 October 2011, scoring in a 3–0 win over Welling United and picking up the man of the match award. As his loan spell was coming to an end, it was revealed that Green had asked to have his Port Vale contract terminated so that he could move closer to his family. The club 'reluctantly agreed' to his request. He played 24 league games for Eastleigh in 2011–12, as the club posted a mid-table finish. They reached the play-offs in the 2012–13 season, with Green playing 37 league games, before being knocked out at the semi-final stage after a penalty shoot-out defeat to Dover Athletic at the Crabble Athletic Ground. He made 45 appearances in the 2013–14 campaign as Eastleigh won promotion as divisional champions.

He scored three goals in 34 league games in the 2014–15 season to help the "Spitfires" to secure a place in the Conference Premier play-offs. He played 39 games in the 2014–15 campaign, as Eastleigh reached the play-off semi-finals, where they lost out to Grimsby Town. He made 38 appearances in the 2015–16 campaign, as Eastleigh finished in seventh place, five points outside the play-off places. He was released by new manager Martin Allen on 10 February 2017. However, he then returned to the club just 12 days later after Allen was sacked and replaced by Richard Hill. He made 45 appearances across the 2016–17 campaign as Eastleigh posted a 15th-place finish, but surgery on an ankle injury meant that he featured only 18 times during the 2017–18 season as the club moved up to 14th-place under the stewardship of Andy Hessenthaler. He featured 39 times throughout the 2018–19 season, helping Eastleigh to reach the play-off semi-finals, where they were beaten by Salford City on penalties. He made 28 appearances in the 2019–20 season, which was permanently suspended on 26 March due to the COVID-19 pandemic in England, with Eastleigh in 17th-place. In the 2020–21 season, Green moved up to fifth on Eastleigh's all-time appearance chart. He made a total of 37 appearances in the 2020–21 campaign.

=== Later career ===
On 28 June 2021, Green joined Havant & Waterlooville of the National League South. He featured eleven times for the "Hawks" before having his contract cancelled and announcing his retirement in December 2021.

On 3 March 2022, Green signed for Southern League Premier Division South side Dorchester Town. The Dorset Echo reported that the club had "pulled off one of the biggest signings in their recent history with the capture of full-back Mike Green". Three weeks later, he left the club to join Southern League Division One South club Lymington Town. In July 2022, he returned to Totton after 11 years. On 26 September 2022, he left the club.

== Career statistics ==
Appearances and goals by club, season and competition
| Club | Season | League | | | FA Cup | | League Cup | | Other | | Total | |
| Club | Season | Division | Apps | Goals | Apps | Goals | Apps | Goals | Apps | Goals | Apps | Goals |
|---|---|---|---|---|---|---|---|---|---|---|---|---|
| Eastleigh | 2009–10 | Conference South | 0 | 0 | 0 | 0 | — | | 0 | 0 | 0 | 0 |
| Totton | 2009–10 | SFL – Div 1 South & West | 32 | 1 | 2 | 0 | — | | 12 | 0 | 46 | 1 |
| Totton | 2010–11 | SFL – Div 1 South & West | 36 | 0 | 0 | 0 | — | | 0 | 0 | 36 | 0 |
| Totton | Total | | 68 | 1 | 2 | 0 | 0 | 0 | 12 | 0 | 82 | 1 |
| Port Vale | 2011–12 | League Two | 4 | 0 | 0 | 0 | 1 | 0 | 0 | 0 | 5 | 0 |
| Eastleigh | 2011–12 | Conference South | 24 | 1 | 0 | 0 | — | | 4 | 0 | 28 | 1 |
| Eastleigh | 2012–13 | Conference South | 37 | 0 | 0 | 0 | — | | 0 | 0 | 37 | 0 |
| Eastleigh | 2013–14 | Conference South | 42 | 0 | 0 | 0 | — | | 3 (Note: Appearance(s) in the FA Trophy) | 0 | 45 | 0 |
| Eastleigh | 2014–15 | Conference Premier | 35 | 3 | 3 | 0 | — | | 1 | 0 | 39 | 3 |
| Eastleigh | 2015–16 | National League | 34 | 0 | 2 | 0 | — | | 2 | 0 | 38 | 0 |
| Eastleigh | 2016–17 | National League | 39 | 0 | 6 | 0 | — | | 0 | 0 | 45 | 0 |
| Eastleigh | 2017–18 | National League | 17 | 0 | 1 | 0 | — | | 0 | 0 | 18 | 0 |
| Eastleigh | 2018–19 | National League | 36 | 1 | 0 | 0 | — | | 3 (Note: One appearance in the FA Trophy and two in the play-offs) | 0 | 39 | 1 |
| Eastleigh | 2019–20 | National League | 25 | 0 | 2 | 0 | — | | 1 | 0 | 28 | 0 |
| Eastleigh | 2020–21 | National League | 34 | 1 | 2 | 0 | — | | 1 | 0 | 37 | 1 |
| Eastleigh | Total | | 323 | 6 | 16 | 0 | 0 | 0 | 15 | 0 | 354 | 6 |
| Havant & Waterlooville | 2021–22 | National League South | 8 | 0 | 2 | 0 | — | | 1 | 0 | 11 | 0 |
| Dorchester Town | 2021–22 | SFL – Premier Div South | 1 | 0 | 0 | 0 | — | | 0 | 0 | 1 | 0 |
| Lymington Town | 2022–23 | SFL – Div One South | 4 | 0 | 0 | 0 | — | | 0 | 0 | 4 | 0 |
| Totton | 2022–23 | SFL – Div One South | 2 | 0 | 2 | 0 | — | | 0 | 0 | 4 | 0 |
| Total (Note: Statistics for Brockenhurst and Christchurch and the 2010–11 season not recorded) | | | 410 | 7 | 22 | 0 | 1 | 0 | 28 | 0 | 461 | 7 |

== Honours ==
Totton

- Southern League Division One South & West: 2010–11
- Hampshire Senior Cup: 2010 & 2011

Eastleigh

- Hampshire Senior Cup: 2012
- Conference South: 2013–14
