= Phil Roe (footballer) =

English footballer

Personal information
- Full name: Philip Michael Roe
- Date of birth: 7 October 1991 (age 35)
- Place of birth: Chelmsford, Essex, England
- Height: 5 ft 10 in (1.78 m)
- Positions: Left-back; midfielder

Youth career
- Sheffield United

Senior career*
Years	Team	Apps	(Gls)
2009–2011	Sheffield United	0	(0)
2009–2010	→ Retford United (loan)		
2010–2011	→ Retford United (loan)		
2011–2012	Port Vale	2	(0)
2012–2013	Matlock Town		
2013–2014	Worksop Town		
2014–2015	Matlock Town		
- * Club domestic league appearances and goals as of 00:00, 31 March 2012 (UTC)

Philip Michael Roe (born 7 October 1991) is an English former footballer who played as a defender. Born in Chelmsford, Essex, he was a Sheffield United youth team player, having two spells on loan at Retford United while with the Blades, but failed to progress to the first-team and moved to Port Vale in summer 2011. He then joined Matlock Town in July 2012 before moving to Worksop Town in February 2013. He returned to Matlock Town in July 2014.

== Career ==
=== Port Vale ===
Roe graduated from the Sheffield United youth system to win two loan spells at Northern Premier League Premier Division club Retford United in 2009 and October 2010. However, United's manager Micky Adams did not offer him a contract in the summer of 2011, leaving Roe without a club. Ironically, Adams was then sacked, only to sign Roe and his former youth team captain Kingsley James, after he was appointed manager at League Two side Port Vale in July 2011. Adams handed Roe his senior début on 22 November 2011, in an FA Cup First Round 1–0 defeat to non-League Grimsby Town at Blundell Park; Roe was an 87th-minute substitute, replacing Adam Yates. Roe signed a new contract with the club the following month, designed to keep him at Vale Park until the end of the 2011–12 season – meanwhile fellow left-back Rob Kozluk was released, leaving Yates and Roe as the only full-back specialists at the club. Roe made his league début on 14 January, replacing Anthony Griffith 80 minutes into a 2–1 home defeat to AFC Wimbledon, and was then given his first start against Shrewsbury Town at the New Meadow on 27 March, but the match was abandoned after 64 minutes due to a fire caused by the failure of the floodlights; he nevertheless gave "an encouraging performance". Though his appearance did not count in official statistics, the yellow card he received for a lunge on Jermaine Grandison remained. With just three appearances all season, Roe was not offered a new contract.

=== Matlock Town and Worksop Town ===
Roe signed with Northern Premier League side Matlock Town in July 2012 as manager Mark Atkins looked to "add competition" to his squad. Roe later left the Gladiators in February 2013 to sign with Worksop Town. The "Tigers" ended the 2012–13 campaign in ninth place, eight places above Matlock. After "intense talks" with manager Mark Shaw, Roe agreed to stay on for the following season. Worksop finished fourth in 2013–14, losing to AFC Fylde in the play-off semi-finals.

He re-signed with Matlock Town in July 2014. Matlock finished 14th in the 2014–15 season.

== Career statistics ==
Appearances and goals by club, season and competition
Club	Season	League			FA Cup		League Cup		Other		Total	
Club	Season	Division	Apps	Goals	Apps	Goals	Apps	Goals	Apps	Goals	Apps	Goals
Sheffield United	2010–11	Championship	0	0	0	0	0	0	—		0	0
Port Vale	2011–12	League Two	2	0	1	0	0	0	0	0	3	0
