= Eastleigh F.C. =

Association football club in England

Coordinates: 50°57′08.26″N 1°22′18.37″W

Eastleigh
- Full name: Eastleigh Football Club
- Nickname: The Spitfires
- Founded: 1946; 80 years ago as Swaythling Athletic
- Ground: Ten Acres
- Capacity: 5,192 (2,700 seated)
- Chairman: Stewart Donald
- League: National League
- 2025–26: National League, 17th of 24
- Website: eastleighfc.com
Home colours	Away colours	Third colours

Eastleigh Football Club is a professional football club based in Eastleigh, Hampshire, England. The team competes in the National League, the fifth level of the English football league system.

Originally formed as Swaythling Athletic in 1946, they joined the Hampshire League in 1950. In 1977, they changed their name to Swaythling before changing again in 1980 to Eastleigh. They were founder members of the Wessex League ahead of the 1986–87 season. Eastleigh remained at this level until they won the division in 2002–03. They subsequently joined the Southern League Eastern division, Isthmian League and Conference South over the following years. After two unsuccessful play-off attempts, Eastleigh were promoted to the top division of non-League as champions in the 2013–14 season. They play their home matches at The Silverlake Stadium.

== History ==
=== Formation to Wessex League (1946–1986) ===
The club was formed on 22 May 1946 by Derik Brooks and a group of friends in the Fleming Arms public house in Swaythling, Southampton and originally known as Swaythling Athletic, which then changed to Swaythling. The club began playing home matches firstly on Southampton Common and then at 'Westfield' in Swaythling. In 1950 they joined the Hampshire League. In keeping with their early progress, the club moved to a new ground at Ten Acres in 1957 – which remains their home to this day. In 1980 the club were renamed Eastleigh. Eastleigh were consistently one of the stronger teams in the top tier of the Hampshire League, Division One, in the early 1980s and they achieved their highest final position of 4th (three times: in 1982, 1984 and 1985.) Their first match in the FA Cup under the Eastleigh name was a 2–1 success against Southern League side Poole Town in 1981. They went on to beat Melksham Town in the next round before succumbing 2–4 to another Southern League side, Dorchester Town.

=== Wessex League (1986–2002) ===
In 1986 Eastleigh F.C. were accepted as one of the founding members of the Wessex League and managed an 8th-place finish in their first season in 1986–1987. Eastleigh didn't manage a top seven finish until the 1995–96 season when a 4th-place finish was achieved, the first of six consecutive top-seven finishes. Paul Doswell joined the club in 2002 as manager and oversaw three successive promotions.

=== Rise up the leagues (2002–2005) ===
In 2002–03 they won the Wessex League and were promoted to Division One East of the Southern League. After finishing fourth in their first season, the club were promoted due to the formation of the Conference North and South taking clubs from the division above, and were transferred into the Premier Division of the Isthmian League.

The club finished third in its first season in the Premier Division, qualifying for the promotion play-offs. After beating Braintree Town 2–0 in the semi-final, they were promoted to the Conference South after a 2–1 victory over Leyton in the final. The club also won the Russell Cotes cup, beating Gosport Borough 3–1 in the final.

=== Conference South (2005–2014) ===
Chart of Eastleigh's yearly table positions since promotion to the Conference South.

Eastleigh's first game in the Conference South was a 1–0 defeat to Hayes. Eastleigh finished their first season in the Conference South in a creditable eighth place. They narrowly missed out on a play-off place in the 2007–08 season coming sixth after a final day defeat at Thurrock (4–1). In 2008–09, they finished third, but lost to Hayes & Yeading United in the play-off semi-finals despite holding a 4–0 advantage at one stage during the first leg. In the 2009–10 season, Eastleigh reached the first round of the FA Cup for the first time narrowly losing to Barrow (2–1).

The ownership of the club changed in late 2011. On 26 November 2011, following a meeting of the board, it was announced that an offer from Bridle Insurance Limited for the majority shareholding of the club had been recommended for acceptance by the current shareholders. Bridle Insurance were then the primary sponsors of Oxford United. Chief executive Stewart Donald and chief operations officer Neil Fox would both come on to the Eastleigh board as directors, with Paul Murray remaining as chairman.

The takeover by Bridle Insurance was eventually confirmed when the club announced the company had acquired the club's shares on 1 February 2012. On 23 March 2012, chairman Paul Murray stood down from his post. Murray had formally stood down as chairman when the club was sold to Bridle Insurance, but had remained at the club in a non-executive chairman role. Mick Geddes was later appointed as his successor.

On 16 May 2012, Eastleigh won their first silverware for seven years, beating Totton 2–0 in the final of the Hampshire Senior Cup.

On Tuesday 11 September 2012, following three successive league defeats, the last 4–0 away to newly promoted side Billericay Town, the club announced, following a meeting between manager Ian Baird and Stewart Donald, that it had been agreed that Ian Baird would leave the club with immediate effect. Baird's replacement was announced the following day as ex-Stevenage Borough manager Richard Hill. Hill has also had spells assisting John Gregory at both Wycombe Wanderers and QPR, and Brian Little at Aston Villa. He has also been employed as assistant manager at Gillingham, Tranmere Rovers and Northampton Town.

Eastleigh came close to achieving promotion to the Conference Premier for the first time during the 2012–13 season, by making the Conference South play-offs through finishing 4th in the league. After initially losing the first leg of the semi-final against Dover Athletic at home 3–1, Eastleigh overturned this with a 2–0 away win in the second leg, so the match went to penalties, with Eastleigh losing 4–2. Eastleigh won the Conference South in 2013–14, sealing the title in front of a crowd of over 1,500 on 18 April 2014 when they beat Basingstoke Town 2–1 and achieved promotion to the Conference Premier for the first time in the club's history for the 2014–15 season.

=== Conference Premier / National League (2014–) ===
Eastleigh's first game in the Conference Premier was a 3–0 victory at Nuneaton Town. Their second game was their first ever live televised game on BT Sport; Eastleigh beat Aldershot Town 1–0 with an injury-time winning goal. The 2014–15 season also saw Eastleigh's second appearance in the FA Cup 1st round proper, where they reached the second round for the first time, beating Lincoln City in the first round with a last-minute goal. Eastleigh lost 2–1 at Southport in their first ever FA Cup second-round fixture. Eastleigh spent their entire first season in the top half of the league and enjoyed an unbeaten run at home until into the new year. As home form dipped their away form soared, the club picking up victories at Braintree, Chester and most notably Bristol Rovers, whom they beat 2–1. Eastleigh featured again on television with a convincing 4–0 home win over Macclesfield. Eastleigh eventually secured a 4th-place finish after five consecutive wins culminating in a 2–1 win at home to Kidderminster in front of a record crowd of 4,024. The playoffs proved a bridge too far for Eastleigh, who were beaten 2–1 at the Silverlake Stadium and 3–0 at Blundell Park by Grimsby Town to lose 5–1 on aggregate.

After a run of just one point from five games, on 23 September 2015, Richard Hill resigned as Eastleigh manager. Chris Todd was quickly appointed caretaker manager, and after three victories from four matches he was confirmed as the new manager on 15 October 2015. Eastleigh had a fine run of form under Todd and rose to third place in the league table by Christmas. Meanwhile, the club was gaining national coverage for its FA Cup exploits. Eastleigh travelled to Crewe in the 1st round and achieved their first ever giant killing, courtesy of a 1–0 win with a Ben Strevens penalty. In the second round, Eastleigh won 2–0 at minnows Stourbridge to record their first ever appearance in the Third round. On 9 January, Eastleigh drew 1–1 with Bolton. The game took place after much speculation it would be postponed, and sold out giving Eastleigh a new record attendance of 5,025. Ten days later Eastleigh travelled to Bolton and lost 3–2, having led 1–0 through a Joe Partington strike. As Eastleigh exited the FA Cup, league form dipped and they eventually finished seventh, missing out on a play-off place.

After just four games of the 2016–17 season, with Eastleigh languishing in 16th place, Chris Todd was relieved of his duties as Eastleigh manager. Ronnie Moore was appointed and enjoyed an unbeaten run to start his time at Eastleigh. On 4 October, Eastleigh beat Maidstone 3–0 to move up to 5th in the league after offering free admission for all, which attracted a crowd of 4,114. However Eastleigh's form dipped and Ronnie Moore left the club on 30 November with personal circumstances cited. Eastleigh promptly appointed Martin Allen, who had won the league with Barnet in 2015. Unfortunately, Allen had little success with Eastleigh and was sacked on 22 February after just two wins from fourteen games.

Whilst Eastleigh struggled in the league they again enjoyed success in the FA Cup. A first round home tie with Swindon Town was selected by the BBC for live coverage, and Eastleigh drew 1–1. Eastleigh won the reply 3–1 at the County Ground. Eastleigh again required a replay to beat FC Halifax Town in the second round triumphing 2–0 at the Shay having drawn 3–3 at the Silverlake. In the third round Eastleigh travelled to Brentford, followed by a record ever away following of nearly 1,500 fans. Eastleigh were 5–1 down at half-time and lost the game 5–1.

Richard Hill was brought in as director of football and in April 2017 was announced as the new Eastleigh manager for the 2017–18 season with Andy Hessenthaler as his assistant. Eastleigh had a poor start to the season and, on 18 December, Hessenthaler was appointed manager with Hill reverting to director of football. Eastleigh finished the season 14th, missing out on a top half placing for the second year in a row.

The summer of 2018 brought change off the field as Chairman Stewart Donald left for League One side Sunderland. His share of Eastleigh F.C. was transferred to Mark Jewell, the new chairman, and 3 other directors, Kenny Amor, Tom Coffey and Joanne Sprigg. In October 2018, following 4 victories manager Andy Hessenthaler left to join Dover Athletic. Ben Strevens was appointed as the new manager. Some good form in early 2019 contributed to Eastleigh finishing the season 7th and in the play-offs. Eastleigh faced a tie at Wrexham and won 1–0 in extra time through a superb Danny Hollands strike. In the semi-final, Eastleigh travelled to Salford. The game finished 1–1 after 120 minutes. Eastleigh led early in the penalty shoot out but eventually lost 4–3 after Chris Zebroski missed the decisive penalty.

The 2019–20 season was shortened by 9 games due to the COVID-19 pandemic. Eastleigh spent most of the season in the middle of the table, eventually finishing 16th. However, in the FA Cup, Eastleigh again reached the Second Round, having beaten Welling in the Fourth Qualifying Round (0-0, 4-2r) and Stourbridge in the First Round (2-2, 3-0r). Eastleigh faced Crewe Alexandra in a televised game at the Silverlake, drawing 1–1 with their League Two opponents thanks to a late equaliser from Southampton loanee Marcus Barnes. The Spitfires lost the replay at Crewe 3–1.

The 2020–21 season was behind closed doors due to the COVID-19 pandemic. Only two Eastleigh home games were available for fans to be at the stadium. The Spitfires finished 9th after losing 2–0 to Solihull Moors on the final day, denying them of a play-off place. During the season, Eastleigh modernised their badge. On 26 January 2022, Ben Strevens left Eastleigh by mutual consent before being replaced by Lee Bradbury. Eastleigh finished the season in 19th place.

In the 2022–23 season, Eastleigh finished in 9th place. On 2 May 2023, Stewart Donald and his company SJD Leisure Holdings Limited completed the takeover of Eastleigh F.C. Donald has a controlling stake in the club of 85% becoming chairman once again with Tom Coffey assuming Vice Chairman position.

In the 2023–24 FA Cup, Eastleigh lost 3–1 to Newport County in a third round replay.

== Stadium ==
Eastleigh moved to Ten Acres in 1957 from their previous ground, Walnut Avenue. The club's record attendance is 5,025 for an FA Cup third round match against Bolton Wanderers on 9 January 2016.

In 1976 floodlights were added to Ten Acres.

In 2004, following promotion to the Isthmian League Premier Division, the old wooden stand was knocked down, and a new 352-seat grandstand was built on the half-way line stretching for just under a third of the pitch. Behind the motorway end hard standing was hard pitchside standing with a cover: this was named the Silverlake Stand. In 2006, the roof was widened across the Silverlake Stand to cover the whole width of the pitch.

Until 2006, the area opposite the grandstand was just hard standing backing into tall fir trees. During the summer of 2006, a metal back and roof were added, along with an electronic scoreboard on the roof of the Premier Telecom stand.

In 2009, 150 seats were added to the middle of the Silverlake Stand to give Eastleigh the necessary ground grading to compete in the Conference South play-offs.

The ground was, again, extensively redeveloped during 2014. New pitch-side fencing was installed following damage to the previous fencing during Eastleigh's championship winning game against Basingstoke. The former East Stand at Sandy Park (home of Exeter Chiefs RFC) was rebuilt along the Premier Telecom side of the ground as well as behind the clubhouse goal, providing a covered terraced accommodation for 2,000 spectators. On 2 December 2014, the newly completed 2,290-seater South Stand was opened for the first time in a Conference Premier game against Dartford, with the club allowing spectators in for free to celebrate the occasion.

In early 2018, the 352-seat grandstand was extended to bring its capacity to 900 seats. This brought the stadium's capacity to 5,500.

== Club colours, nickname and mascot ==
Eastleigh's colours are blue and white. They play in predominantly blue shirts with a white trim. They have white shorts and blue socks.

The club were without an official nickname until 2005 when a competition was run amongst the fans and "Spitfires" was chosen by supporter Mike Wimbridge. The Spitfire aeroplane was built in Southampton and first flown from Eastleigh Aerodrome, now Southampton Airport.

After the club gained its official nickname the club had an irregular mascot, Sammy the Spitfire, who was a dog. However, in 2015 a new mascot was selected, Brooksy Bear, in honour of Mr Derik Brooks, who founded the club in 1946.

For the 2024–25 season, they have two mascots: Brooksy Bear and Mrs Brooksy.

== Rivalries ==
In the club's early history, while competing in the lower tiers of the English football pyramid, Eastleigh’s primary rivalries were localised affairs against nearby Hampshire clubs, including Sholing, Hamble, AFC Totton and Winchester City.

During the mid-2000s to the 2010s however, as Eastleigh climbed into the National League South, matches against Havant & Waterlooville and Salisbury City rose to prominence in their place. The rivalry with Havant & Waterlooville in particular, intensified following the appointment of former Havant manager Ian Baird as Eastleigh boss in October 2007. Meanwhile, competitive meetings with Salisbury became less frequent due to their off-field financial struggles, which ultimately culminated in the club's liquidation in 2014.

Presently, Eastleigh's most prominent fixture is against Aldershot Town, with both clubs having competed together in the National League since the 2014–15 season. Dubbed the Hampshire Derby (along with matches against Havant) the rivalry features a somewhat unrequited dynamic, due to Aldershot having more traditional rivalries of their own. In a similar vein, fixtures against Woking have also grown in importance during this sustained period in the fifth tier.

== Players ==
=== First team squad ===
As of 5 November 2026

Note: Flags indicate national team as defined under FIFA eligibility rules; some limited exceptions apply. Players may hold more than one non-FIFA nationality.

No.	Pos.	Nation	Player
1	GK	ANT	Nick Townsend
3	DF	ENG	Ben Drake
4	DF	ENG	Harry Sidwell (on loan from AFC Wimbledon)
5	DF	ENG	Ibrahim Bakare
6	DF	ENG	Temi Eweka
7	MF	ENG	Max Dickov
8	MF	ENG	Josh Lundstram
9	FW	NED	Manny Duku
10	FW	ENG	Will Randall
11	FW	ENG	Aaron Blair
12	FW	ENG	Oliver Hawkins
14	DF	USA	Nick Akoto
15	GK	ENG	Josh Jeffries

No.	Pos.	Nation	Player
16	DF	GRN	Aaron Pierre
17	FW	ENG	Dion Rankine (on loan from Crewe Alexandra)
18	DF	ENG	Tommy Dobson-Ventura (on loan from Southampton)
21	MF	MAW	Nelson Khumbeni (on loan from Gillingham)
22	FW	ENG	Barney Stone
23	FW	LBN	Hady Ghandour
24	MF	JAM	Jordan Cousins
25	DF	ENG	Coby Killick
27	DF	ENG	Reece Johnson (on loan from Sheffield Wednesday)
28	DF	FIJ	Josh Laqeretabua (on loan from Charlton Athletic)
30	MF	ENG	Connor Underhill
32	MF	WAL	Jonny Williams
—	DF	ENG	Jake Caprice

== Full international players ==
Eastleigh players who have represented their country.

- England (England C) - Paul McCallum (2024)
- Jamaica - Jordan Cousins
- Grenada - Aaron Pierre
- Antigua and Barbuda - Nick Townsend
- Wales - Jonny Williams
- Lebanon - Hady Ghandour

== Notable former players ==
Among the players who have played for Eastleigh and went on to play in The Football League are:

- (England) Will Aimson
- (England) Tyrone Mings
- (England) Mark Marshall
- (England) Aaron Martin
- (England) Damian Scannell
- (England) Brett Williams
- (England) Anton Robinson
- (England) Harry Pell
- (England) Jamie Turley
- (England) Josh Payne
- (Wales) Joe Partington
- (England) Luke Coulson
- (France) Mikael Mandron
- (England) Bondz N'Gala
- (England) Ryan Bird
- (England) Mekhi Leacock-McLeod
- (Wales) David Pipe
- (England) Ben Close
- (England) Tyler Garratt
- (England) Hakeem Odoffin
- (England) Callum Howe
- (England) Samuel Matthews
- (England) Joey Jones
- (England) Josh Hare
- (England) Rob Atkinson
- (Poland) Maksymilian Stryjek
- (England) Jack Payne
- (England) Joe Tomlinson
- (England) Marcus Barnes
- (Scotland) Ben House
- (Kenya) Vincent Harper
- (Northern Ireland) JJ McKiernan
- (England) Dominic Gape
- (England) Joe McDonnell
- (Saint Kitts and Nevis) Tyrese Shade
- (Wales) Kieron Evans

== Non-playing staff ==
According to Club website

- Chairman Stewart Donald
- Vice Chairman Tom Coffey
- Operations Director Tom Coffey
- Finance Director Joanne Sprigg
- Directors Mick Geddes, Peter Vickery, Mick Budny, Alan Harding, Allen Prebble
- Life President Derik Brooks
- Interim Manager Richard Hill
- Assistant manager Jason Bristow,
- Goalkeeping coach Vince Bartram
- First Team Analyst Matt Musgrove
- Club doctor Dr Greg Warner & Dr Luke Summat

== Managers ==
Name	Nationality	From	To	P	W	D	L	GF	GA	GD	Win%	Honours
Jenner Brown	England	1982/83	1983/84	TBC	TBC	TBC	TBC	TBC	TBC	TBC	TBC	
Dick Donohoe	England	1984/85	1986/87	TBC	TBC	TBC	TBC	TBC	TBC	TBC	TBC	
Tony Noble	England	1987/88	1989/90	TBC	TBC	TBC	TBC	TBC	TBC	TBC	TBC	
Dave Saunders	England	unknown	June 1990	TBC	TBC	TBC	TBC	TBC	TBC	TBC	TBC	
Don Gowans	England	June 1990	Midway through 1994/95 season	TBC	TBC	TBC	TBC	TBC	TBC	TBC	TBC	
Roger Sherwood	England	Midway through 1994/95 season	1996/97	TBC	TBC	TBC	TBC	TBC	TBC	TBC	TBC	
Ray Light	England	1997/98	1998/99	TBC	TBC	TBC	TBC	TBC	TBC	TBC	TBC	
Derek Holloway	England	1999/2000	2000/01	TBC	TBC	TBC	TBC	TBC	TBC	TBC	TBC	
Trevor Parker	England	TBC	November 2001	TBC	TBC	TBC	TBC	TBC	TBC	TBC	TBC	
John Diaper (Caretaker Manager)	England	November 2001	1 May 2002	TBC	TBC	TBC	TBC	TBC	TBC	TBC	TBC	
Paul Doswell	England	1 May 2002	4 December 2006	TBC	TBC	TBC	TBC	TBC	TBC	TBC	TBC	2003 Wessex League title, 2004 Southern League Eastern Division 4th (promotion), 2005 Isthmian league playoff winners, Russell Cotes cup winners
Jason Dodd	England	4 December 2006	9 July 2007	27	9	11	7	35	24	+11	33.3%	
David Hughes	England	9 July 2007	3 October 2007	11	6	0	5	16	15	+1	54.5%	
Ian Baird	England	3 October 2007	11 September 2012	255	118	50	87	452	370	+82	46.3%	2012 Hampshire Senior Cup
Richard Hill	England	12 September 2012	23 September 2015	160	88	27	45	290	200	+90	55%	2014 Conference South champions
Chris Todd (Caretaker)	Wales	23 September 2015	15 October 2015	4	3	0	1	8	7	+1	75%	
Chris Todd	Wales	15 October 2015	17 August 2016	42	18	11	13	55	47	+8	42.9%	
Ben Strevens (Caretaker)	England	17 August 2016	22 August 2016	1	0	1	0	0	0	0	0%	
Ronnie Moore	England	22 August 2016	30 November 2016	22	11	7	4	40	22	+18	50%	
Martin Allen	England	1 December 2016	22 February 2017	15	2	5	8	16	28	−12	13%	
Richard Hill	England	22 February 2017	17 December 2017	41	11	14	16	51	63	−12	27%	
Andy Hessenthaler	England	18 December 2017	8 October 2018	39	15	8	16	48	63	-15	38%	
Ben Strevens (Caretaker)	England	8 October 2018	5 November 2018	5	1	2	2	4	5	-1	20%	
Ben Strevens	England	5 November 2018	26 January 2022	156	65	41	50	218	206	+12	42%	
Jason Bristow (Caretaker)	England	26 January 2022	28 February 2022	8	1	3	4	5	9	-4	13%	
Lee Bradbury	England	28 February 2022	26 August 2023	76	29	17	30	99	115	-16	38%	
Richard Hill and Jason Bristow (Caretakers)	England	26 August 2023	28 September 2023	8	3	3	2	10	12	-2	38%	
Richard Hill	England	28 September 2023	17 February 2024	27	10	6	11	52	56	-4	37%	
Kelvin Davis	England	19 February 2024	20 September 2025	75	27	21	27	107	100	+7	36%	
Scott Bartlett	England	24 September 2025	21 February 2026	0	0	0	0	0	0	+0	0%	

As of 21:16 20 September 2025

Up to and including match vs Braintree Town on 20 Sep 2025)
(Above stats include matches in the League, Play-Offs and all rounds in the FA Cup, FA Trophy, Hampshire Senior Cup and Conference League Cup)

== League history ==
Season	League Contested	Level	Pld	W	D	L	GF	GA	GD	Pts	League Position	Avg. Home Attendance^{1}	FA Cup	FA Trophy	Top scorer
2012–13	Conference South	6	42	22	6	14	79	61	+18	72	4th of 22; Play-off semi-finals	593	3Q	3Q	Jai Reason 19
2013–14	Conference South	6	42	26	8	8	71	40	+31	86	1st of 22; Promoted	707	3Q	QF	Craig McAllister 15
2014–15	Conference Premier	5	46	24	10	12	87	61	+26	82	4th of 24; Play-off semi-finals	1,752	R2	R1	James Constable 19
2015–16	Conference Premier	5	46	21	12	13	64	53	+11	75	7th of 24	2,014	R3	R2	James Constable 17
2016–17	National League	5	46	14	15	17	56	63	−7	57	15th of 24	2,246	R3	R1	Mikael Mandron 15
2017–18	National League	5	46	13	17	16	65	72	-7	56	14th of 24	1,959	4Q	R1	Chris Zebroski & Ben Williamson 10
2018–19	National League	5	46	22	8	16	62	63	-1	74	7th of 24; Play-off semi- finals	1,830	4Q	R1	Paul McCallum 27
2019–20	National League	5	37	11	13	13	43	55	-12	46	16th of 24	1,832	R2	R3	Tyrone Barnett 12
2020–21	National League	5	42	18	12	12	49	40	+9	66	9th of 24	1,138	R1	R3	Joe Tomlinson 12
2021–22	National League	5	44	12	10	22	52	74	-22	46	19th of 23	2,686	R1	R4	Danny Whitehall 11
2022–23	National League	5	46	19	10	17	56	57	-1	67	9th of 24	2,376	R1	R5	Danny Whitehall 12
2023–24	National League	5	46	16	11	19	73	87	-14	59	13th of 24	2,096	R3	R3	Paul McCallum 31
2024–25	National League	5	46	14	17	15	58	61	-3	59	13th of 24	2,202	4Q	R5	Tyrese Shade 14
2025–26	National League	5	46	13	11	22	57	80	-23	50	17th of 24	2,392	R1	R4	Aaron Blair 17

^{a}: Moved to Isthmian Premier League after Non-League System restructuring

PR = Preliminary Round; Q = Qualifying Round; R = Round Proper; P = Position; Pld = Matches played; W = Matches won; D = Matches drawn; L = Matches lost; GF = Goals for; GA = Goals against; GD = Goal difference; Pts = Points

== Club records ==
- Best FA Cup performance: Third round, 2015–16, 2016–17, 2023–24
- Best FA Trophy performance: Quarter-finals, 2013–14
- Best FA Vase performance: Fourth round, 1982–83, 1990–91, 1994–95
- Record attendance: 5,075 vs Newport County, FA Cup third round replay, 16 January 2024
- Biggest victory: 12–1 vs Hythe & Dibden, 11 December 1948
- Heaviest defeat: 0–11 vs Austin Sports, 1 January 1947
- Most appearances: Ian Knight, 611
- Most goals: Johnnie Williams, 177

=== Most appearances ===
Competitive matches only. After 29 May 2021 match v Solihull Moors

#	Name	Nationality	Position	Eastleigh career	Appearances	Goals
1	Ian Knight	England	Left Back	1975-91	611	12
2	Keith Cooper	England	Full Back/Central Defender	1974-86	574	5
3	Johnny Williams	England	Unknown	Unknown	449	3
4	Bill Ragan	England	Unknown	Unknown	428	10
5	Michael Green	England	Full Back/Centre Back	2009-2021	409	7
6	Terry Rawlins	England	Unknown	Unknown	374	27
7	Mel Davolls	England	Full Back/Centre Back	1966-1978	372	6
8	Frank Mew	England	Forward	1946-60	370	100
9	Malcolm Harris	England	Goalkeeper	1969-81	351	0
10	Barry Joslin	England	Unknown	1982-90	343	4

== Player of the Season ==
Year	Winner	Ref
2005–06	(England) Daniel Smith	
2006–07	(England) Andy Forbes	
2007–08	(England) Andy Forbes	
2008–09	(South Africa) Warren Goodhind	
2009–10	(England) Richard Gillespie	
2010–11	(England) Jamie Slabber	
2011–12	(England) Jamie Slabber	
2012–13	(England) Glen Southam	
2013–14	(England) Ben Strevens	
2014–15	(England) Ross Flitney	
2015–16	(England) Joe Partington	
2016–17	(England) Michael Green	
2017–18	(England) Samuel Matthews	
2018–19	(England) Alex Wynter	
2019–20	(England) TBC	
2020–21	(England) Joe McDonnell	
2021–22	(England) Andrew Boyce	
2022–23	(England) Joe McDonnell	
2023–24	(England) Paul McCallum	
2024–25	(Saint Kitts and Nevis) Tyrese Shade	
2025–26	(England) Aaron Blair	

== Honours ==
League

- Conference South (level 6)
  - Champions: 2013–14
- Wessex League
  - Champions: 2002–03
- Hampshire League Division Two
  - Champions: 1969–70
- Hampshire League Division Three
  - Champions: 1950–51, 1953–54
- Southampton Senior League (West)
  - Champions: 1949–50

Cup

- Russell Cotes Cup
  - Winners: 2005–06
- Hampshire Intermediate Cup
  - Winners: 1950–51
- Hampshire Midweek Floodlit Cup
  - Winners: 1979–80
- Hampshire Senior Cup
  - Winners: 2012–13
