= Gareth Owen (footballer, born 1982) =

English-born Welsh footballer

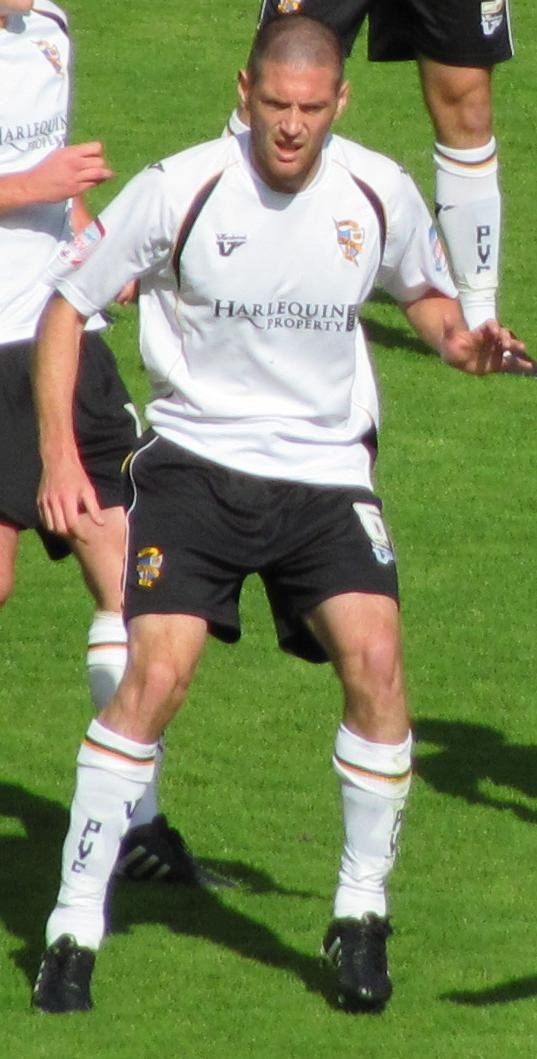
- Owen with Port Vale in 2010

Personal information
- Full name: Gareth David Owen
- Date of birth: 21 September 1982 (age 44)
- Place of birth: Cheadle, England
- Height: 6 ft 1 in (1.85 m)
- Position: Centre back

Youth career
- 1999–2001: Stoke City

Senior career*
Years	Team	Apps	(Gls)
2001–2005	Stoke City	5	(0)
2004	→ Oldham Athletic (loan)	15	(1)
2004	→ Torquay United (loan)	5	(0)
2005	→ Oldham Athletic (loan)	9	(0)
2005–2007	Oldham Athletic	17	(0)
2006–2007	→ Stockport County (loan)	39	(0)
2007–2009	Stockport County	44	(0)
2008	→ Yeovil Town (loan)	7	(0)
2008–2009	→ Port Vale (loan)	4	(0)
2009–2013	Port Vale	110	(2)
Total		255	(3)

International career
2001	Wales U19	2	(0)
- * Club domestic league appearances and goals

Gareth David Owen (born 21 September 1982) is an English-born Welsh former footballer.

A defender, he represented Wales at under-19 level. He began his career at Stoke City, signing as a professional in August 2001. He made his first-team debut in the 2003–04 season, also spending time on loan at Oldham Athletic. He spent part of 2004–05 on loan at Torquay United before returning on loan at Oldham. His loan deal was made permanent in the summer for a £50,000 fee, though he did not find success in the 2005–06 campaign. He spent the 2006–07 season on loan at Stockport County. He was voted the club's Player of the Season, after which he joined Stockport permanently, and was installed as club captain. Following a successful 2007–08 season, he joined Yeovil Town on loan in October 2008, having fallen out with the management at Stockport. He then joined Port Vale on a loan deal that was made permanent in January 2009. He was a key member of the first team in 2009–10 and 2010–11 and was also appointed as the club's reserve team manager for the 2011–12 season. He retired from playing in January 2013 and began coaching at the Stoke City Academy.

== Club career ==
=== Stoke City ===
Born and raised in Cheadle, Staffordshire (just outside Stoke-on-Trent), Owen attended Painsley High School in his youth. He was in the same school year as future Port Vale teammate Adam Yates. Owen began his career as a trainee with his local club, Stoke City, turning professional in August 2001. However, in March 2002, he broke his leg in a youth team match against Leeds United; this meant two ankle operations which cost Owen 15 months out of action.

He made his senior debut in a First Division clash with Wigan Athletic on 14 October 2003; he replaced Clint Hill on the 80-minute mark, as Stoke lost 2–1 at the JJB Stadium thanks to two Geoff Horsfield goals. Four days later, he made a cameo against Ipswich Town. To gain first-team experience, he spent the second half of the 2003–04 season on loan at Second Division side Oldham Athletic. He scored his first senior goal at Boundary Park in a 4–1 win over Plymouth Argyle on 17 April. Upon his return to the Potteries, he won his home debut at the Britannia Stadium; he played the full ninety minutes in what was a 4–1 win over West Bromwich Albion.

At the start of the 2004–05 season he was loaned out to League One club Torquay United, where he played six games. After returning from Plainmoor, he played two further games for Stoke, making substitute appearances in 1–0 wins over Coventry City and Millwall.

=== Oldham Athletic ===
He returned to Oldham on loan in March 2005, playing nine times until the end of the season when he was transferred from Stoke to Oldham Athletic for a fee of £50,000. However, he made only 21 appearances in 2005–06. Never fitting in at the club, in May 2006 he put in a transfer request, which was accepted. He later claimed he had 'fallen out of love' with football at Boundary Park.

=== Stockport County ===
On 3 July 2006, Owen joined Stockport County on a season-long loan deal. He enjoyed a successful 2006–07 season, playing 42 games, including a FA Cup Third round tie at Premier League Watford. He was voted the club's Player of the Season and joined Stockport permanently for an undisclosed fee in June 2007. In the 2007–08 season, Owen went on to captain Stockport back to League One, lifting the play-off trophy after a 3–2 win over Rochdale at Wembley Stadium. In the final he played with a face-mask due to an injury. However, the season was not a complete success, as County suffered a shock defeat to Isthmian League Staines Town in the FA Cup First round. In October 2008 he went out on loan to Yeovil Town after a public falling-out with manager Jim Gannon. After the loan was extended in November he stated his aim to sign a permanently contract with the "Glovers", though the next week he ended up joining Dean Glover's Port Vale.

=== Port Vale ===
Despite starting his career at Stoke City in November 2008, Owen agreed to join local rivals Port Vale on loan until January 2009, with a view to a permanent deal. He made his Vale debut on the day the loan move was agreed, helping the "Valiants" to keep a clean sheet against Barnet despite barely getting chance to meet his new teammates. Owen was expected to sign a permanent deal with Port Vale in January 2009. Still, he was unexpectedly recalled by Stockport to negotiate a settlement for the remainder of his contract. This issue was finally resolved on 19 January, and he left Stockport by mutual consent to sign for Port Vale on a two-and-a-half-year contract. During this period he also held informal talks with Dario Gradi's Crewe Alexandra. In March 2009 Owen picked up an ankle injury, which kept him out of action for the rest of the season. During the downtime he spent time working on his coaching badges and helping Ray Williams on scouting duties.

A key part of the back three in 2009–10, Owen scored his first goal for the club in a 4–0 home win over Grimsby Town on 5 September. He was transfer listed in late September, along with the entire Port Vale squad, after manager Micky Adams saw his team slip to a third consecutive defeat. A key member of the Vale defence, after breaking his cheekbone he once again donned a custom-made protective face mask. He also was forced to take a few weeks on the sidelines in order to undergo surgery, though he made a speedy recovery. A muscle problem in his lower back meant he was forced to undergo sugar injections to keep playing during the latter half of the season. At the end of the season he announced that he wished to extend his Port Vale career beyond summer 2011.

He started the 2010–11 season as a key member of the Vale defence. When his former boss Jim Gannon arrived as Vale's new manager in January 2011, Owen insisted that 'what's done is done', and there was speculation that Gannon would make Owen captain. However, the following month he was sidelined after fracturing his left ankle in a 1–1 draw with Wycombe Wanderers. This 'fracture' in fact turned out to be severe bruising, leaving Owen a much shorter recovery time. In April 2011, he began contract talks on a new two-year deal. However, the new contract meant taking a pay cut, whilst Crewe Alexandra and Burton Albion both expressed an interest in the defender. Before he made his decision he was awarded with the Chairman's Player of the Year award. He decided to sign a two-year deal with Crewe Alexandra, citing unrest at Vale Park as one of his motivations for switching clubs. However, once he discovered Micky Adams was returning as manager he reversed his decision and put pen to paper on a two-year deal with the "Valiants" as a player-coach. He hoped his role as reserve team coach would stand him in good stead for a future career in management.

An achilles injury forced him to sit out most of the 2011–12 pre-season. However, Adams allowed Owen to act as manager for a pre-season friendly against Stone Dominoes, a game which Vale won 2–0. Despite coaching the reserves and continuing his university work, as a player he missed just one of the "Valiants" first ten league games of the season. However, he was then struck down by injury, and underwent a hernia operation in November. The next month he took up yoga to help overcome his injuries, and also undertook scouting assignments for the club. He returned to action in the boxing day win at Hereford United. However, a week later he split his foot open. Deciding to play on against the pain, he was sidelined again in mid-January after breaking his left hand in training. On 29 February, after learning that the club were unable to pay the wage bill, he injured his knee in a reserve team game against Stoke City; the injury effectively ended his season.

He began the 2012–13 season on the bench and requested a loan move, though remained at Vale Park as Micky Adams was unable to sign any more covering defenders due to the club being in administration. As the club's PFA representative, Owen negotiated a compromise agreement with the administrators that saw the players take a temporary wage cut until new owners were found. He made only his second appearance of the campaign against Northampton Town on 27 October. Still, he had to leave the game at half-time after injuring himself with an "ugly lunge" on Adebayo Akinfenwa. He left the club by mutual consent in January 2013. He claimed to have "a burning desire to play football", though he had also made inroads into coaching and media work during his time at the club.

== International career ==
Owen picked up two Wales under-19s caps, both easy victories over the Faroe Islands under-19s. The first was a 4–1 win on 7 August 2001, the second was an 8–2 victory two days later.

== Coaching career ==
Having rejected playing offers from numerous clubs, Owen retired as a player and began working as the under-12 coach at the Stoke City Academy in 2013. Owen was promoted to assistant manager of Stoke City U18s for the 2018–19 season. He was promoted again to the role of academy director in April 2019, following the departure of Gareth Jennings to FIFA. In July 2023, Owen announced he will leave Stoke in September 2023, however, he later reversed his decision. In February 2025, Owen was appointed to a new position at Stoke, taking on the role of academy technical director. Owen left his position at Stoke in December 2025.

== Personal life ==
Although from Staffordshire (where he played county cricket as a youngster), he supports Chelsea, thanks to his father. With a brother in the Armed Forces, Owen ran in the Stoke-on-Trent 2010K run, a marathon to celebrate the city's centenary, to raise money for Help for Heroes. He managed to raise over £1,000.

In June 2009, he started a course to earn his UEFA Level Two coaching badge. A few months later he began a sports science degree course at Manchester Metropolitan University, to get into teaching or coaching. In 2012, he graduated from Staffordshire University with a First Class degree in Professional Sports Writing and Broadcasting. He began writing weekly columns on Port Vale for The Sentinel for the 2011–12 season. In November 2011, he was voted onto the PFA's management committee.

== Career statistics ==
Appearances and goals by club, season and competition
Club	Season	League			FA Cup		League Cup		Other		Total	
Club	Season	Division	Apps	Goals	Apps	Goals	Apps	Goals	Apps	Goals	Apps	Goals
Stoke City	2001–02	Second Division	0	0	0	0	0	0	0	0	0	0
Stoke City	2002–03	First Division	0	0	0	0	0	0	0	0	0	0
Stoke City	2003–04	First Division	3	0	0	0	0	0	0	0	3	0
Stoke City	2004–05	Championship	2	0	0	0	0	0	0	0	2	0
Stoke City	Total		5	0	0	0	0	0	0	0	5	0
Torquay United (loan)	2004–05	League One	5	0	0	0	1	0	0	0	6	0
Oldham Athletic	2003–04	Second Division	15	1	—		—		—		15	1
Oldham Athletic	2004–05	League One	9	0	0	0	0	0	0	0	9	0
Oldham Athletic	2005–06	League One	17	0	3	0	1	0	0	0	21	0
Oldham Athletic	Total		41	1	3	0	1	0	0	0	45	1
Stockport County	2006–07	League Two	39	0	1	0	1	0	1 (Note: Appearance(s) in the Football League Trophy.)	0	42	0
Stockport County	2007–08	League Two	36	0	2	0	2	0	4 (Note: 1 appearance in the Football League Trophy and 3 appearances in the play-offs.)	0	44	0
Stockport County	2008–09	League One	8	0	0	0	1	0	1	0	10	0
Stockport County	Total		83	0	3	0	4	0	6	0	96	0
Yeovil Town (loan)	2008–09	League One	7	0	0	0	—		—		7	0
Port Vale	2008–09	League Two	12	0	1	0	0	0	0	0	13	0
Port Vale	2009–10	League Two	40	1	1	0	3	0	2	0	46	1
Port Vale	2010–11	League Two	36	1	4	0	2	0	1	0	43	1
Port Vale	2011–12	League Two	24	0	0	0	0	0	1	0	25	0
Port Vale	2012–13	League Two	2	0	0	0	0	0	0	0	2	0
Port Vale	Total		114	2	6	0	5	0	4	0	129	2
Career total			255	3	12	0	11	0	10	0	288	3

== Honours ==
Stockport County

- Football League Two play-offs: 2008

Individual

- Stockport County Player of the Year: 2006–07
