= Simon Richman =

English footballer

Personal information
- Full name: Simon Andrew Richman
- Date of birth: 2 June 1990 (age 36)
- Place of birth: Ormskirk, England
- Height: 1.81 m (5 ft 11 in)
- Position: Midfielder

Youth career
- 2000–2006: Bolton Wanderers
- 2006–2008: Port Vale

Senior career*
Years	Team	Apps	(Gls)
2008–2010	Port Vale	48	(5)
2010–2011	Worcester City	37	(4)
2011–2021	Altrincham	313	(21)
2021–2023	Bradford (Park Avenue)	70	(7)
Total		468	(37)
Medal record
Representing Great Britain
Football
Universiade
Silver medal – second place	2013 Kazan	Football
- * Club domestic league appearances and goals

Simon Andrew Richman (born 2 June 1990) is an English former professional footballer who played as a midfielder. He scored 41 goals in 534 league and cup appearances in a 17-year career.

A former youth team player with Port Vale, he was a regular in the first-team throughout the 2008–09 season, picking up the club's Young Player of the Year award. He was released in the summer of 2010 when he joined Worcester City for a season. He signed with Altrincham in June 2011 and helped the club to win promotion out of the Conference North via the play-offs in 2014 and to win the Northern Premier League Premier Division title in 2017–18 and the National League North play-offs again in 2020. After ten years with Altrincham, he joined Bradford (Park Avenue) for two years in October 2021.

== Career ==
=== Port Vale ===
Born in Ormskirk, Lancashire, Richman attended Maricourt Catholic School. A former member of the Bolton Wanderers Academy, Richman worked his way up the ranks from the Port Vale youth team to the Reserves and broke into the main team in the 2007–08 season, signing his first professional contract in April 2008.

At the beginning of the 2008–09 season, he established himself as a first-team regular, earning eight consecutive starts and also got his first league goal. However, as the season went on, the Valiants made numerous loan signings, and Richman went out of favour. On 6 December 2008, he came on as a substitute against Grimsby Town, scoring an 88th-minute winner. This gave manager Dean Glover a selection headache as the youngster battled with more experienced players for a first-team slot. Following that match he played another 21 games that season, his consistent performances earning him the club's Young Player of the Year Award.

In pre-season, he picked up a groin injury, which sidelined him for several months. He was later transfer listed in late September, despite being injured, along with the entire Port Vale squad, after manager Micky Adams saw his team slip to a third consecutive defeat. In January 2010 he received interest off League Two club Grimsby Town and Scottish First Division side Ayr United. His agent, former Vale legend Phil Sproson, believed a loan move would be in the player's interests. On 20 February he made his first appearance in four months, replacing Tommy Fraser in a 2–0 defeat by Barnet. In April 2010 he learned that he would not be offered a new contract by manager Micky Adams.

=== Worcester City ===
In July 2010, Richman enjoyed a trial at Conference National club, and Conference North title holders Southport. The next month he was on trial at Worcester City, where former teammate Danny Glover had found a home. He signed a contract with the club soon after. He enjoyed a solid start to his career, and claimed that the club helped him to rediscover his passion for the game. Throughout the season he earned praised for his energy levels and work rate.

=== Altrincham ===
Offered a new contract by Worcester, Richman instead opted to sign with league rivals Altrincham. He took this decision as his new club was closer to his Liverpool home, and because he had played under new manager Lee Sinnott at Port Vale. Richman made his Altrincham debut as a substitute in a 1–1 draw against Workington. He scored his first Altrincham goal in his second appearance, again as a substitute, in 3–0 win over Histon. The club missed out on the play-offs by 11 points in 2011–12, before securing a play-off spot by an 11-point margin in 2012–13. They were beaten 4–2 by Brackley Town in the play-off semi-finals, despite Richman scoring in a 2–1 victory at Moss Lane. The "Robins" again qualified for the play-offs in the 2013–14 campaign, and Richman played in the final as the club secured promotion with a 2–1 extra time victory over Guiseley.

He played 43 games in the 2014–15 season to help Altrincham post a 17th-place finish. He made 42 appearances across the 2015–16 campaign as they were relegated in 22nd-position. He played 33 games in the 2016–17 season as Altrincham were relegated out of the National League North in last place. They made an immediate return, however, winning the Northern Premier League Premier Division title at the end of the 2017–18 season, with Richman scoring four goals from 42 matches. On 26 December 2018, Richman made his 300th appearance for Altrincham in a 2–0 defeat at Stockport County. He ended the 2018–19 season with one goal in 40 appearances, helping Altrincham to the play-offs, where they were defeated by Chorley on penalties in the semi-finals. He scored one goal in 31 appearances in the 2019–20 season, which was permanently suspended on 26 March due to the COVID-19 pandemic in England, with Altrincham in the play-offs in fifth-place. The play-offs took place in the summer. Altrincham secured promotion with a 1–0 victory over Boston United at York Street on 1 August. He played just 13 games in the 2020–21 campaign and left the club at the end of the season.

=== Bradford (Park Avenue) ===
On 12 October 2021, Richman signed with Bradford (Park Avenue); manager Mark Bower said he was a "massive signing" who would help with Park Avenue's injuries in the midfield department. He played 27 times in the 2021–22 campaign, scoring four goals. He played 40 of the club's 46 league games in the 2022–23 campaign as Avenue were relegated in 23rd place. He had his contract terminated by mutual consent on 22 November 2023 after telling the club that "due to personal reasons, playing football was not a priority for him".

== Personal life ==
Richman has a degree in chemical engineering from the University of Manchester.

== Career statistics ==
Appearances and goals by club, season and competition
Club	Season	League			FA Cup		League Cup		Other		Total	
Club	Season	Division	Apps	Goals	Apps	Goals	Apps	Goals	Apps	Goals	Apps	Goals
Port Vale	2007–08	League One	6	0	0	0	0	0	0	0	6	0
Port Vale	2008–09	League Two	37	5	2	0	1	0	1 (Note: Appearance(s) in the EFL Trophy.)	0	41	5
Port Vale	2009–10	League Two	5	0	0	0	1	0	0	0	6	0
Port Vale	Total		48	5	2	0	2	0	1	0	53	5
Worcester City	2010–11	Conference North	37	4	0	0	—		3 (Note: Appearance(s) in the FA Trophy.)	1	40	5
Altrincham	2011–12	Conference North	30	2	0	0	—		2	0	32	2
Altrincham	2012–13	Conference North	35	8	3	0	—		4	1	42	9
Altrincham	2013–14	Conference North	36	3	0	0	—		4	0	40	3
Altrincham	2014–15	Conference Premier	38	1	2	0	—		3	0	43	1
Altrincham	2015–16	National League	36	0	3	0	—		2	0	41	0
Altrincham	2016–17	National League North	33	2	2	0	—		5	1	40	3
Altrincham	2017–18	Northern Premier League; Premier Division	37	3	0	0	—		5	1	42	4
Altrincham	2018–19	National League North	36	1	0	0	—		4	0	40	1
Altrincham	2019–20	National League North	21	1	3	0	—		10	0	34	1
Altrincham	2020–21	National League	11	0	1	0	—		1	0	13	0
Altrincham	Total		313	21	14	0	0	0	40	3	367	24
Bradford (Park Avenue)	2021–22	National League North	25	4	0	0	—		2	0	27	4
Bradford (Park Avenue)	2022–23	National League North	40	3	0	0	—		1	0	41	3
Bradford (Park Avenue)	2023–24	Northern Premier League; Premier Division	5	0	0	0	—		1	0	6	0
Bradford (Park Avenue)	Total		70	7	0	0	0	0	4	0	74	7
Career total			468	37	16	0	2	0	48	4	534	41

== Honours ==
Altrincham

- Conference North play-offs: 2013–14
- Northern Premier League Premier Division: 2017–18
- National League North play-offs: 2019–20
