= Ross Davidson (disambiguation) =

Ross Davidson is a Scottish actor.

Ross Davidson may also refer to:

- Ross Davidson (footballer, born 1973), English footballer played for Sheffield United and Shrewsbury Town
- Ross Davidson (footballer, born 1989), English footballer played for Port Vale
- Ross Davidson (footballer, born 1993), Scottish footballer plays for Irvine Meadow XI
- Ross William Wild, English singer and sex offender known professionally as Ross Davidson
