= Steve Thompson (footballer, born 1989) =

English footballer

Personal information
- Full name: Stephen Thompson
- Date of birth: 15 April 1989 (age 37)
- Place of birth: Peterlee, England
- Height: 5 ft 7 in (1.71 m)
- Position: Centre forward

Team information
- Current team: Stockton Town

Youth career
- 2005–2008: Middlesbrough

Senior career*
Years	Team	Apps	(Gls)
2008–2009	Port Vale	17	(2)
2009	→ Stafford Rangers (loan)	4	(2)
2009–2010	Telford United	14	(0)
2010–2012	Durham City		
2012–2020	Darlington		
2020–2022	Spennymoor Town	19	(0)
2022	→ Marske United (loan)	10	(2)
2022–	Stockton Town	136	(26)
- * Club domestic league appearances and goals as of 19:06, 1 May 2026 (UTC)

Stephen Thompson (born 15 April 1989) is an English footballer who plays as a striker for Northern Premier League Premier Division club Stockton Town.

Unable to make the first team at Middlesbrough, he signed with Port Vale in May 2008. He left Vale Park by mutual consent in October 2009, at which point he joined Telford United. He spent one season with Telford before joining Durham City. He signed with Darlington in September 2012. He helped the club to the Northern Football League title in 2012–13, promotion out of the Northern Premier League Division One North via the play-offs in 2015, and then Premier Division title in 2015–16. He was named the club's Player of the Year for the 2017–18 season and equalled their goalscoring record of 100 goals in December 2019. Thompson left Darlington at the end of the 2019–20 season and signed for another National League North club, Spennymoor Town, where he stayed for two years, which included a loan spell at Marske United where he won the Northern Premier League Division One East play-offs. He signed for Stockton Town in May 2022 and helped the club to win promotion out of the Northern Premier League Division One East play-offs in 2024.

== Career ==
=== Port Vale ===
Born in Peterlee, County Durham, Thompson began his career at Middlesbrough in the academy and youth team, and he signed for the club at the start of the 2007–08 season. Still, he did not play a game for the first-team. Released at the end of the season, he had a successful trial with Port Vale and signed with the club in May 2008, citing manager Lee Sinnott's style of play as a reason for joining the club.

He spent four months working off a hamstring injury, before making his debut as a 74th minute substitute on 6 December 2008 against Grimsby Town. His first league start came two weeks later in a 1–0 defeat to Chesterfield at Vale Park, he was taken off in the 53rd minute, despite the protestations of the home crowd. His first goal came against Rochdale on 28 December, as he hit a 90th-minute winner for a Vale side reduced to 10-men. Described by Ian Brightwell as "probably the best finisher we have at the club", he was dropped from the first-team in February 2009. He worked hard at the end of the season to put himself back in contention and made eight further appearances under Dean Glover before the season's end.

During a 2009–10 pre-season friendly with Nantwich Town, Thompson was dismissed for violent conduct, shoulder-barging an opposition player in an off the ball incident. Manager Micky Adams promised to punish Thompson in some way for his lack of discipline. Two days later Adams placed him on the transfer list, along with five other youngsters. Early the next month local Conference North side Stafford Rangers enquired about Thompson's availability, after fellow Vale youngster Ross Davidson performed well in his loan spell. A one-month loan deal was quickly agreed. His contract with Port Vale was cancelled by mutual consent in October 2009, Thompson aimed to find first-team football elsewhere.

=== Telford and Durham ===
The day after his release from Port Vale, Thompson signed with Telford United of the Conference North. He spent one season with Telford, but had issues with the long distances he was travelling to the club from his home. Thompson subsequently joined Northern Premier League Division One North side Durham City, and was described by the club's website as "a quick thinking classic playmaker who has pace, good feet and excellent passing ability which mean he is equally at home both scoring and making goals for others." Durham finished 17th in 2010–11, but resigned from the league at the end of 2011–12 to join the Northern League.

=== Darlington ===
He signed with Northern League side Darlington in September 2012. He scored his first goal in his fourth appearance for the club in a 4–1 victory over Penrith, he struck the ball from 20 yards (18 m) out on a mud-filled pitch. Darlington won promotion as champions in 2012–13. The "Quakers" reached the play-offs in the Northern Premier League Division One North in 2013–14, where they were knocked out by Ramsbottom United; Thompson scored 27 goals during the campaign. He scored his 50th goal in his 100th appearance for Darlington against Mossley. In 2015, Darlington beat Bamber Bridge 2–0 in the Division One North play-off final to secure promotion into the Premier Division. A second-successive promotion was achieved as Darlington won the Premier Division title with a game to spare of the 2015–16 season. Darlington finished fifth in the National League North in 2016–17 but were denied a place in the play-offs due to Blackwell Meadows's lack of seating. He scored 11 goals in 38 league games during the 2017–18 season, including a brace against North Ferriby United, as "Darlo" finished in 12th place. He was named the club's Player of the Year for 2018. Having been assigned to play right-back for much of the campaign, he still went on to score ten goals in 43 appearances in the 2018–19 season, with Darlington posting a 16th-place finish.

On 26 December 2019, Thompson's 72nd-minute penalty gave his side a 2–1 win at home to Spennymoor Town and completed his century of goals for Darlington, equalling Alan Walsh's club record that had stood for 35 years. His tally included four hat-tricks: against Leamington, Sunderland Ryhope Community Association, Burscough and Wakefield. He scored six goals in 36 appearances in the 2019–20 season, which was permanently suspended on 26 March due to the COVID-19 pandemic in England, with Darlington in eleventh place. After eight years with the club, he chose not to accept Darlington's offer of a new contract and left at the end of the 2019–20 season.

=== Spennymoor Town ===
Thompson signed for another National League North club, Spennymoor Town, on 20 May 2020. He made 12 appearances, scoring twice, before the 2020–21 season was curtailed early due to the ongoing pandemic. In his second season, he made 14 appearances before joining Northern Premier League Division One East club Marske United in February 2022 on loan for a month. The loan was extended to the end of the season. Thompson produced a man of the match performance in the semi-final to help Marske reach and win promotion via the play-off final. He made one final substitute appearance for Spennymoor before leaving at the end of the season.

=== Stockton Town ===
Thompson signed for Stockton Town, Marske United's play-off final opponents, in May 2022. He scored eight goals from 41 games in the 2022–23 campaign, including an appearance in the play-off final defeat to Long Eaton United. He scored seven goals in 41 games in the 2023–24 season. He scored the winning penalty kick in the penalty shoot-out victory over Dunston UTS in the play-off final. He was voted the club's Player of the Month for August 2024 after claiming three goals in seven appearances. He scored 14 goals in 49 appearances across the 2024–25 campaign. The season ended in disappointment as Stockton were disqualified from play-offs for playing a suspended player. He appeared 30 times in the 2025–26 season, including in the play-off semi-final defeat to Hednesford Town.

== Career statistics ==
As of match played 28 April 2026

Club	Season	League			FA Cup		League Cup		Other		Total	
Club	Season	Division	Apps	Goals	Apps	Goals	Apps	Goals	Apps	Goals	Apps	Goals
Port Vale	2008–09	League Two	17	2	0	0	0	0	0	0	17	2
Port Vale	2009–10	League Two	0	0	0	0	0	0	0	0	0	0
Port Vale	Total		17	2	0	0	0	0	0	0	17	2
Darlington	2016–17	National League North	40	8	0	0	—		0	0	40	8
Darlington	2017–18	National League North	38	11	0	0	—		0	0	38	11
Darlington	2018–19	National League North	38	11	0	0	—		0	0	38	11
Darlington	2019–20	National League North	29	5	3	1	—		4 (Note: Appearances in FA Trophy)	0	36	6
Spennymoor Town	2020–21	National League North	8	0	2	1	—		2	1	12	2
Spennymoor Town	2021–22	National League North	11	0	3	0	—		1	0	15	0
Spennymoor Town	Total		19	0	5	1	—		3	1	27	2
Marske United	2021–22	Northern Premier League (NPL); Division One East	10	2	—		—		2 (Note: Appearances in Northern Premier League Division One East play-offs)	0	12	2
Stockton Town	2022–23	NPL East Division	34	7	1	0	—		6 (Note: Two appearances and one goal in FA Trophy, two appearances in Durham Challenge Cup, two appearances in the play-offs)	1	41	8
Stockton Town	2023–24	NPL East Division	34	7	2	0	—		5 (Note: Two appearances in FA Trophy, two appearances in Durham Challenge Cup, one appearance in the play-offs)	0	41	7
Stockton Town	2024–25	NPL Premier Division	41	11	2	1	—		6 (Note: Five appearances and two goals in FA Trophy, one appearance in the play-offs)	2	49	14
Stockton Town	2025–26	NPL Premier Division	27	1	1	0	—		2 (Note: One appearance in FA Trophy, one appearance in the play-offs)	0	30	1
Stockton Town	2026–27	NPL Premier Division	0	0	0	0	—		0	0	0	0
Stockton Town	Total		136	26	6	1	—		19	3	161	30

== Honours ==
Individual

- Darlington Player of the Year: 2017–18

Darlington

- Northern Football League Division One: 2012–13
- Northern Premier League Division One North play-offs: 2015
- Northern Premier League Premier Division: 2015–16

Marske United

- Northern Premier League Division One East play-offs: 2022

Stockton Town

- Northern Premier League Division One East play-offs: 2024
