= Chris Martin (footballer, born 1990) =

English footballer

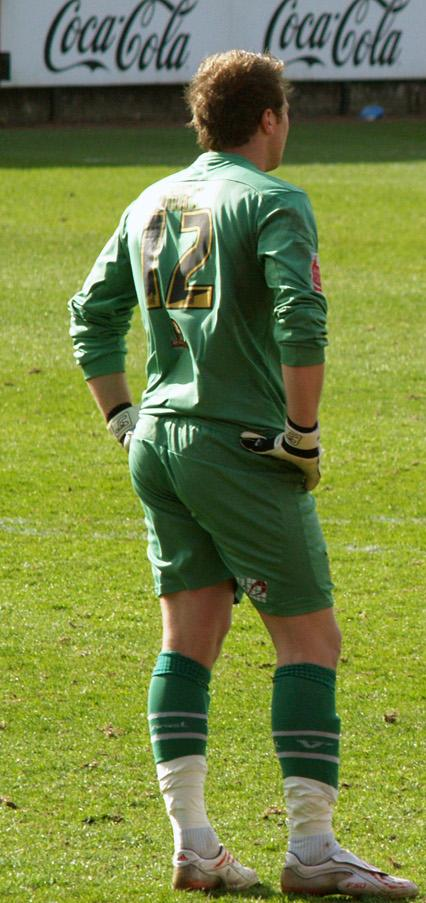
- Martin, hands on hips, after conceding in a 1–1 draw with Bury at Vale Park.

Personal information
- Full name: Christopher Joseph Martin
- Date of birth: 21 July 1990 (age 36)
- Place of birth: Mansfield, England
- Height: 6 ft 0 in (1.83 m)
- Position: Goalkeeper

Youth career
- Nottingham Forest
- 2005–2007: Port Vale

Senior career*
Years	Team	Apps	(Gls)
2007–2012	Port Vale	74	(0)
2007	→ Kidsgrove Athletic (loan)		
2012–2013	Ilkeston	37	(0)
2013–2015	Mickleover Sports		
2015–2016	Leek Town	54	(0)
2016–2017	Kidsgrove Athletic		
- * Club domestic league appearances and goals

Christopher Joseph Martin (born 21 July 1990) is an English former professional footballer who played as a goalkeeper.

Having come through the club's youth set-up, he turned professional at Port Vale in 2007 after spending time on loan at non-League Kidsgrove Athletic. He spent 2007–08 and 2008–09 as Joe Anyon's deputy before winning the #1 jersey in the summer of 2010, establishing himself as the club's first-choice keeper in the 2009–10 campaign. However, he was released after he spent most of the 2010–11 and 2011–12 seasons on the bench behind new signing Stuart Tomlinson. In August 2012, he dropped three tiers to join Ilkeston. The following year, he dropped another division to play for Mickleover Sports. He helped Mickleover to win the Northern Premier League Division One South title in 2014–15. He joined Leek Town in June 2015 and then Kidsgrove Athletic in December 2016. He was sworn in as a policeman in September 2017.

== Career ==
=== Port Vale ===
Born in, and growing up in Mansfield, Martin attended Frederick Gent School. He joined the Port Vale youth system after leaving his hometown club Nottingham Forest in 2005. He joined Northern Premier League First Division club Kidsgrove Athletic on loan in March 2007 at the age of 16. His Vale debut came against Swindon Town at the County Ground on 19 April 2008; where Port Vale were beaten 6–0. Manager Lee Sinnott refused to blame Martin for the heavy defeat.

After Joe Anyon broke his leg in March 2009, Martin was given his first run in the first team, playing the last ten games of the 2008–09 season. Anyon failed to recover for the start of the 2009–10 season. New manager Micky Adams looked to sign Stuart Tomlinson to have an experienced option in goal, but the cash-strapped club could not afford to offer Tomlinson a permanent deal. However, Martin did not disappoint, an assured display against Rochdale was followed by a solid performance in the League Cup at Bramall Lane, where Vale defeated Championship side Sheffield United 2–1. Adams commented: "We knew our keeper would have to have a great night, and what a night he's had." However, he was transfer listed in late September, along with the entire Port Vale squad, after Adams saw his team slip to a third consecutive defeat.

He remained the first choice keeper however, his shot-stopping ability, overall competence and reliability making him the star player of the first half of the campaign. In January 2010 he kept three clean sheets in a row, the first time Vale had done so in over three years. His record of conceding just 25 goals in 26 League Two matches by February led the club to promise him a new contract, and led to public praise from teammate Adam Yates. After a run of 38 consecutive games he was rested in February 2010, as manager Adams wished to see Joe Anyon in competitive action. Martin regained his place the next month after Anyon made two costly errors in his seven games. The teenager picked up the Young Player of the Year award for his 47 appearances. He was offered a new contract by the club at the end of the season, whilst Anyon was released. Martin signed the two-year contract, which came with an increase in wages.

In May 2010, Stuart Tomlinson was announced as his competition for the 2010–11 season. Tomlinson said he was looking forward to working with Martin and goalkeeping coach Mark Grew. Martin stated he hoped to be more communicative with his defenders throughout the season. Tomlinson received the nod from Adams, and Martin had to wait until February 2011 for first-team football, at which point Tomlinson was out with a hip injury and Jim Gannon was manager. Martin was dropped after conceding a comical own goal in a 3–1 defeat to Stevenage, but won a recall the following match as Tomlinson left the field due to a recurrence of his hip injury. The pair continued to battle for a starting place, though Tomlinson supported Martin after he committed another blunder in a 2–1 loss at home to Oxford United on 12 March. Over the course of the season he was restricted to just 14 league appearances by Tomlinson's consistency.

He started the 2011–12 season on the bench for league games, with Tomlinson preferred by Micky Adams, who had returned to the club as manager. Neither Tomlinson or Martin could nail down their first-team place though; Tomlinson conceded twelve goals in his first seven games of the season, whilst Martin conceded ten times in his first five games. Assistant manager Mark Grew told the media that "they've both been disappointing". Martin made only his fourth league appearance of the season on 7 January, as injury ruled Tomlinson out of the trip to Southend United. Tomlinson won back his first-team spot after returning to fitness, and Martin was not offered a new contract at the end of the season. By a quirk of fate, his last game for the club mirrored his debut almost exactly, as Swindon recorded a 5–0 victory at the County Ground on 28 April.

=== Non-league ===
He was invited to train at AFC Telford United in July 2012, and had erroneously been reported as having signed a contract with the club. The next month he signed with Ilkeston of the Northern Premier League Premier Division. He made 40 appearances in all competitions as the club finished 11th in the 2012–13 campaign. He signed with Mickleover Sports for the 2013–14 campaign, and helped the club to the play-off final, where they were beaten by Belper Town. He was named in the division's Team of the Year as Mickleover won promotion as champions in 2014–15. He signed with Leek Town in June 2015. Leek finished eighth in the Northern Premier League Division One South in the 2015–16 campaign. He joined divisional rivals Kidsgrove Athletic in December 2016 after losing his first-team place at Leek to Ben Chapman. The "Grove" finished 12th in the Northern Premier League in the 2016–17 season.

== Personal life ==
Martin was sworn in as a police officer by Derbyshire Constabulary in September 2017.

== Career statistics ==
Appearances and goals by club, season and competition
Club	Season	League			FA Cup		League Cup		Other		Total	
Club	Season	Division	Apps	Goals	Apps	Goals	Apps	Goals	Apps	Goals	Apps	Goals
Port Vale	2006–07	League One	0	0	0	0	0	0	0	0	0	0
Port Vale	2007–08	League One	2	0	0	0	0	0	0	0	2	0
Port Vale	2008–09	League Two	11	0	0	0	0	0	1 (Note: Appearance(s) in Football League Trophy)	0	12	0
Port Vale	2009–10	League Two	39	0	3	0	3	0	2	0	47	0
Port Vale	2010–11	League Two	14	0	0	0	0	0	2	0	16	0
Port Vale	2011–12	League Two	8	0	1	0	1	0	1	0	11	0
Port Vale	Total		74	0	4	0	4	0	6	0	88	0
Ilkeston	2012–13	Northern Premier League; Premier Division	37	0	0	0	—		3 (Note: Appearance(s) in Derbyshire Senior Cup)	0	40	0
Leek Town	2015–16	Northern Premier League; Division One South	41	0	4	0	—		3 (Note: One appearance in FA Trophy; two appearances in Staffordshire Senior Cup)	0	48	0
Leek Town	2016–17	Northern Premier League; Division One South	13	0	2	0	—		1 (Note: Appearance(s) in FA Trophy)	0	16	0
Leek Town	Total		54	0	6	0	—		4	0	64	0
Total (Note: Statistics for Kidsgrove Athletic and Mickleover Sports not recorded.)			165	0	10	0	4	0	13	0	192	0

== Honours ==
Individual

- Northern Premier League Division One South Team of the Year: 2014–15

Mickleover Sports

- Northern Premier League Division One South: 2014–15
