= Danny Facey =

Grenadian international footballer

Personal information
- Position: Striker

Team information
- Current team: Albion Sports

Senior career*
Years	Team	Apps	(Gls)
2009–2010	Towngate	5	(9)
2010–2011	Bradford Park Avenue	8	(3)
2011–?	Ossett Town		
?–2015	Albion Sports		
2015–2016	Brighouse Town		
2016–	Albion Sports		

International career^{‡}
2011	Grenada	2	(0)
- * Club domestic league appearances and goals as of 19:45, 6 September 2016 (UTC) ‡ National team caps and goals as of 19:45, 6 September 2016 (UTC)

Danny Facey is a Grenadian international footballer who plays for English club Albion Sports, as a striker.

== Career ==
Facey scored nine goals in five games for Towngate, and moved from Bradford Park Avenue to Ossett Town in January 2011.

In July 2015 he joined Brighouse Town, returning to Albion Sports in July 2016.

Facey made his international debut for Grenada in 2011.

== Personal life ==
He is the younger brother of Delroy Facey and cousin to Anthony Griffith.
