= Tommy Fraser =

English footballer (born 1987)

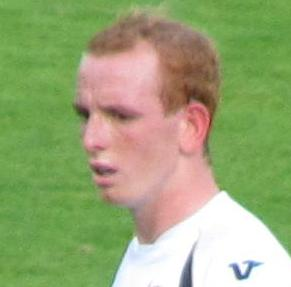
- Fraser as Port Vale captain (September 2010).

Personal information
- Full name: Thomas Francis Peter Fraser
- Date of birth: 5 December 1987 (age 38)
- Place of birth: Brighton, England
- Height: 1.80 m (5 ft 11 in)
- Position: Midfielder

Youth career
- 2004–2006: Brighton & Hove Albion

Senior career*
Years	Team	Apps	(Gls)
2006–2009	Brighton & Hove Albion	78	(2)
2006	→ Bognor Regis Town (loan)	1	(0)
2009–2011	Port Vale	50	(2)
2011	Barnet	20	(0)
2011–2013	Whitehawk		
2013	Melbourne Knights FC		
2013–2014	Whitehawk	38	(3)
2014	Ebbsfleet United	5	(0)
2014	Peacehaven & Telscombe		
2014–2015	Lewes	9	(0)
2015–2016	Burgess Hill Town	4	(0)
2016	Whitehawk	8	(0)
2016	Burgess Hill Town	0	(0)
2016	Bognor Regis Town	2	(0)
Total		215	(7)
- * Club domestic league appearances and goals

Thomas Francis Peter Fraser (born 5 December 1987) is an English former footballer who played as a midfielder.

Starting his career with hometown club Brighton & Hove Albion, Fraser was youth team captain and then a semi-regular in the first-team for three seasons. In June 2009, he signed with Port Vale, where he was quickly made captain. He left the club in January 2011 and immediately joined Barnet. He remained with the club London club for ten months, before joining Whitehawk in December 2011. Fraser emigrated to Australia in February 2013 before returning to Whitehawk in the summer. He then had brief spells at Ebbsfleet United, Peacehaven & Telscombe, Lewes and Burgess Hill Town (over two spells), Whitehawk again and Bognor Regis Town.

== Early life ==
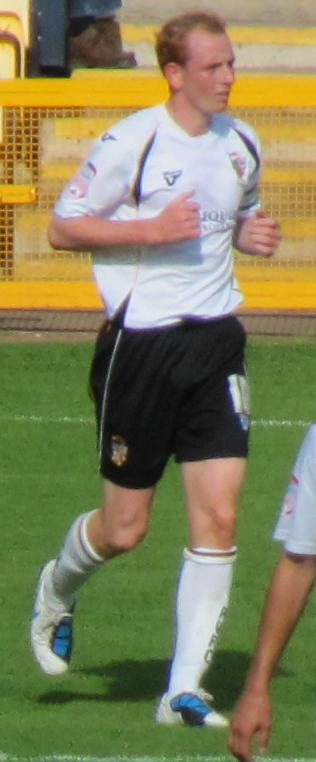
Fraser at Vale Park as Port Vale captain.

Fraser's father, Frankie, was a youth team player at Brighton & Hove Albion before a knee injury ended his professional career; he went on to play for Whitehawk. He is also the grandson of former Richardson Gang member "Mad" Frankie Fraser. He said: "I couldn't tell you anything he's done, and I've never read a book about it. I'm not really interested – he's just my grandad as far as I'm concerned." Growing up in Brighton, Fraser attended Varndean School and Varndean College. He is an Arsenal fan.

== Career ==
=== Brighton & Hove Albion ===
Fraser was born in Brighton and progressed through the youth ranks at League One side Brighton & Hove Albion, where he was awarded a professional contract in the summer of 2006. In March 2006, Fraser was sent on loan to Conference South side Bognor Regis Town, where he made only one appearance. On 9 September 2006, Fraser made his debut for Brighton at The New Den, coming off the bench; later in the game Fraser cleared off the line as Millwall looked to have scored, but Fraser's actions saved the club's clean sheet as Brighton won the match 1–0.

Fraser started life on the wing, before later taking up a position in the centre of midfield. At times he was also used as a defender, a role in which he earned praise off his teammate Matt Richards in February 2008, before he was offered a one-year contract two months later. After 102 appearances and 3 goals for the "Seagulls", Fraser left Brighton after the expiration of his contract in June 2009.

=== Port Vale ===
Fraser signed with Port Vale on a free transfer in June 2009, linking up with former manager Micky Adams for the 2009–10 season. He was appointed as club captain, after impressing in the pre-season. At twenty one years of age, and new to the club, his appointment came as a surprise to some, especially with more senior options in Sam Stockley, Marc Richards and Gareth Owen. However, Adams had faith in the young midfielder's vocal abilities and general leadership qualities. Putting in solid performances in Vale's unbeaten start to the season, he took to the field despite still suffering with an ankle injury. His first goal for the club seemed to come in a 4–0 home win over Grimsby Town on 5 September. However, after the match Marc Richards claimed the last touch and therefore took the credit for the goal. Fraser seemed to attract violence; on 25 August, Sheffield Wednesday's Francis Jeffers was sent off for head-butting Fraser, two weeks later Fraser and Aldershot Town captain John Halls almost came to blows before the match had even begun. He was transfer listed in late September, along with the entire Port Vale squad, after manager Micky Adams saw his team slip to a third consecutive defeat. He remained club captain and a first-team regular though, striking up a midfield pairing with Anthony Griffith, who he also shared a house with. His performances as captain earned him public praise from assistant manager Geoff Horsfield, though the fans were critical at times of his inconsistency. He found himself the new focus of disgruntled supporters in early 2010, following Danny Glover's demotion to the reserves, and Marc Richards' rising goal tally. Fraser vowed to ignore the booing. He also retained the captain's armband for the next season, and vowed "to be more mature both on and off the pitch" to be a better captain.

At the start of the 2010–11 season, Fraser set the club a goal of promotion, saying that "I won't be happy until I've achieved promotion with Port Vale". The strong performances of Anthony Griffith and Gary Roberts left only an unfamiliar wide role for Fraser, and a minority of fans became dissatisfied with his performances on the wing and again began booing the young captain. Micky Adams left the club in December 2010, and was replaced by Jim Gannon. Two weeks into Gannon's reign Fraser left the club by mutual consent to find first-team football, preferring this option to a loan deal.

=== Barnet ===
Fraser signed with Barnet on a deal lasting two and a half years. Signed by caretaker manager Paul Fairclough, he played under Martin Allen and then another caretaker manager, Giuliano Grazioli, within the space of a few months. He played a total of fifteen games for the "Bees" in what remained of the 2010–11 campaign, as the club retained their Football League status with a final day 1–0 win over former club Port Vale at Underhill; Fraser was a stoppage-time substitute in the game. New manager Lawrie Sanchez picked Fraser for just six games in 2011–12, the last of which was a 4–0 defeat to Swindon Town on 24 September. Two months later, Fraser left the club by mutual consent. He returned to Vale Park to train under Micky Adams, though was not expected to be offered a contract at Port Vale.

=== Non-League ===
Fraser joined Whitehawk of the Isthmian League in December 2011, where he played alongside his younger brother James. Whitehawk won the Isthmian League Division One South title in 2011–12. He made 31 appearances in the 2012–13 season for Darren Freeman's "Hawks", and was sent off in his final game in a 3–1 defeat to Harrow Borough at the Earlsmead Stadium on 23 February.

He left England to live in Australia in March 2013, signing for National Premier Leagues Victoria club Melbourne Knights FC. He soon returned to England however, and re-signed with Whitehawk in July 2013. He played 38 Conference South games in the 2013–14 season, helping the club to finish one point above the relegation zone.

Fraser joined Steve Brown's Ebbsfleet United, also of the Conference South, in May 2014. He signed with Isthmian League club Peacehaven & Telscombe in September 2014. He moved on to Lewes three months later.

After leaving Lewes in February 2015, Fraser signed for newly promoted Isthmian League Premier Division side Burgess Hill Town in June 2015. He signed with Whitehawk for a third time in March 2016. Four months later he returned to Burgess Hill Town, before he joined former loan club Bognor Regis Town in November 2016.

== Career statistics ==
Appearances and goals by club, season and competition
Club	Season	League			FA Cup		League Cup		Other		Total	
Club	Season	Division	Apps	Goals	Apps	Goals	Apps	Goals	Apps	Goals	Apps	Goals
Brighton & Hove Albion	2006–07	League One	27	1	3	0	1	0	4 (Note: Appearance(s) in the Football League Trophy.)	0	35	1
Brighton & Hove Albion	2007–08	League One	24	0	4	0	1	0	3	0	32	0
Brighton & Hove Albion	2008–09	League One	27	1	2	1	2	0	4	0	35	2
Brighton & Hove Albion	Total		78	2	9	1	4	0	11	0	102	3
Bognor Regis Town (loan)	2006–07	Conference South	1	0	0	0	—		0	0	1	0
Port Vale	2009–10	League Two	38	2	1	0	3	0	2	0	44	2
Port Vale	2010–11	League Two	12	0	4	0	2	0	2	0	20	0
Port Vale	Total		50	2	5	0	5	0	4	0	64	2
Barnet	2010–11	League Two	15	0	—		—		—		15	0
Barnet	2011–12	League Two	5	0	0	0	1	0	0	0	6	0
Barnet	Total		20	0	0	0	1	0	0	0	21	0
Whitehawk	2013–14	Conference South	38	3	0	0	—		2	0	40	3
Ebbsfleet United	2014–15	Conference South	5	0	0	0	—		0	0	5	0
Lewes	2014–15	Isthmian League; Premier Division	9	0	0	0	—		0	0	9	0
Burgess Hill Town	2015–16	Isthmian League; Premier Division	4	0	0	0	—		0	0	4	0
Whitehawk	2015–16	National League South	8	0	0	0	—		0	0	8	0
Bognor Regis Town	2016–17	Isthmian League; Premier Division	2	0	0	0	—		0	0	2	0
Career total (Note: Complete statistics for Whitehawk, Melbourne Knights FC and Peacehaven & Telscombe unavailable.)			215	7	14	1	10	0	17	0	256	8

== Honours ==
Whitehawk

- Isthmian League Division One South: 2011–12
