= Joe Anyon =

English footballer

Personal information
- Full name: Joseph Anyon
- Date of birth: 29 December 1986 (age 39)
- Place of birth: Lytham St Annes, England
- Height: 6 ft 2 in (1.88 m)
- Position: Goalkeeper

Youth career
- Blackburn Rovers
- 2003–2004: Port Vale

Senior career*
Years	Team	Apps	(Gls)
2004–2010	Port Vale	109	(0)
2005	→ Stafford Rangers (loan)	5	(0)
2005	→ Stafford Rangers (loan)	5	(0)
2005	→ Harrogate Town (loan)	2	(0)
2006	→ Harrogate Town (loan)	9	(0)
2010–2012	Lincoln City	59	(0)
2011	→ Morecambe (loan)	4	(0)
2012–2014	Shrewsbury Town	11	(0)
2013	→ Macclesfield Town (loan)	0	(0)
2015	Crewe Alexandra	0	(0)
2015–2017	Scunthorpe United	16	(0)
2017–2019	Chesterfield	16	(0)
2019–2020	Chorley	4	(0)
Total		240	(0)

International career
2001–2002	England U16	6	(0)
2002–2003	England U17	3	(0)
- * Club domestic league appearances and goals

Joseph Anyon (born 29 December 1986) is an English footballer who played as a goalkeeper.

A youth player at Port Vale, he turned professional at the club in 2004 and was loaned out to non-League sides Stafford Rangers and Harrogate Town to gain experience. He was the Vale's first-choice goalkeeper from his debut in December 2006 up until a clash that saw him break his leg in March 2009 – later in the year he was voted Player of the Year. He failed to regain his place following recovery from the injury and was released in the summer of 2010, whereupon he signed with Lincoln City. At City, he was loaned out to Morecambe. He was voted Lincoln's Player of the Season in 2011–12. He joined Shrewsbury Town in July 2012. He joined Macclesfield Town on an emergency loan in January 2013. He left Shrewsbury in the summer of 2014. He returned to the game with Crewe Alexandra in January 2015 before he signed with Scunthorpe United later in the month. He joined Chesterfield in May 2017 and spent two years as a backup before joining Chorley in July 2019.

== Career ==
=== Port Vale ===
Born in Lytham St Annes, Lancashire, Anyon grew up supporting Blackpool. He played in the Blackburn Rovers youth system before joining Port Vale. He joined Stafford Rangers on loan towards the end of the 2004–05 season, making five appearances. He rejoined Stafford on loan in August 2005, again making five appearances. At the end of the season he was voted Youth Player of the Year by the Port Vale management. After winning a first-team contract with Vale, Anyon spent time on loan at Harrogate Town, making two appearances in November. He rejoined Harrogate in February 2006, making nine appearances before returning to Vale after breaking his jaw in April.

He made his first-team debut for the Vale in December 2006, after first-choice goalkeeper Mark Goodlad ruptured his right achilles tendon against Bristol City in December 2006 and had to have reconstructive surgery. He then played the rest of the 2006–07 season, with only 25 goals scored against him. Goodlad was forced to retire due to his injury and Anyon then established himself as the first-choice keeper, and was voted Young Player of the Year by the Port Vale management. He was also rumoured to have had his progress tracked by both Liverpool and Birmingham City. In August 2007 the Daily Mirror reported that his club had rejected a £250,000 bid from Fulham.

Following a 3–1 home defeat to Macclesfield Town in the FA Cup on 28 November 2008, Anyon blasted his teammates, labelling their performance as "a disgrace". He fractured his tibia after clashing with Drew Talbot in a 2–1 defeat at Chesterfield on 28 March 2009, bringing a premature end to his season. Despite this, his performances that season earned him the 2009 Player of the Year Award, as well as the award for the best player away from home. The season began with a disagreement with then-manager Lee Sinnott, but Anyon was #1 under Glover and conceded sixty goals in his 39 appearances, giving Vale one of the better defensive records in the lower half of the League Two table. In May 2009 he signed a new one-year contract with the Vale.

He returned to fitness to play a reserve team game on 23 September 2009. His next challenge was to displace teenager Chris Martin. He was transfer listed in late September, along with the entire Port Vale squad, after manager Micky Adams saw his team slip to a third consecutive defeat. He said he did not intend to move out on loan to aid in his comeback, despite admitting he had "itchy feet" over a return to first-team action. In January 2010 he stated that he was willing to join another club on loan in order to get some games. However, he returned to the starting line up at Vale Park the next month, after young rival Martin was rested. He performed well over seven games, but made two costly errors that resulted in two goals and dropped points in the play-off hunt. Thus he was consigned to the bench until the season's end, at which point he was told he would not be offered a new contract at the club. However, he was told that if he failed to find a new club then he may be offered a new contract at Vale Park on reduced pay.

=== Lincoln City ===
In May 2010 he signed a two-year deal with Chris Sutton's Lincoln City. Goalkeeping coach Paul Musselwhite said of him "he's a very good keeper, he's still very young but with a lot of talent, a lot of potential and experience". He had only came to the club's attention when Musselwhite spotted on television that he had been released by Port Vale. Anyon replaced the popular Rob Burch, who had signed with Notts County. He started well at his new club, putting in some match winning performances. He made a costly error during a heavy home defeat to Bury on 23 November, but four days later put in a 'heroic' display against Hereford United to keep the club in the FA Cup. On 17 January he made another 'howler' in a 2–1 home defeat to Wycombe Wanderers. Lincoln bottom of the Football League, new manager Steve Tilson signed Trevor Carson on loan from Sunderland, who immediately took Anyon's place in goal. In March 2011, Anyon joined fellow League Two side Morecambe on an emergency loan, following an injury to Barry Roche, who was Sammy McIlroy's regular custodian. He made a costly error in his first game for the club, gifting Bury a 1–0 win on 8 March. He recovered five days later to save a Gareth Evans penalty, and was praised for his overall performance in the 1–0 defeat to Bradford City at the Globe Arena. After two further appearances he returned to Sincil Bank, where he faced a new rival in Aston Villa loanee Elliot Parish. In May 2011, the club was relegated out of the Football League, and Anyon was made available for a free transfer.

The "Imps" had a poor season in 2011–12, finishing just outside the relegation zone. Along with Josh Gowling, John Nutter and Alan Power, Anyon was one of the club's rare permanent features throughout the campaign, keeping his first-team place under both Steve Tilson and new boss David Holdsworth. He beat Gowling and Power to the Player of the Season award, and was also voted as the Away Player of the Season. During the season, he regularly issued an "inspiring battle cry" in the local press, talked up "the biggest club in the Blue Square Bet Premier", and also attempted to bring unity between the club's disgruntled supporters and embattled management. Holdsworth described Anyon as a "big voice", and praised his "impeccable" attitude. On the pitch his performances were seen as a "huge ray of light" from the start of the season, and coach Neil Gardner told the Lincolnshire Echo that he believed Anyon could go on to play at Championship level.

=== Shrewsbury Town ===
Anyon joined Graham Turner's Shrewsbury Town in July 2012, arriving at the New Meadow on the same day as rival goalkeeper Chris Weale. He made his debut for the "Shrews" on 9 October, in a Football League Trophy clash with Crewe Alexandra, but had to leave the pitch due to injury on 19 minutes. On 25 January 2013, Anyon joined Macclesfield Town on a seven-day emergency loan after Lance Cronin broke a thumb in training. His debut came one day later at Moss Rose, in a 1–0 defeat to Premier League side Wigan Athletic in the fourth round of the FA Cup; Anyon's first touch for the "Silkmen" was to get a hand to Jordi Gómez's penalty, which he was unable to save. Anyon finally made his league debut for Shrewsbury on 15 February 2014 in a local derby with his former club Port Vale, keeping a clean sheet in a 0–0 draw. He went on to make 11 league appearances in the 2013–14 season under new manager Michael Jackson, but could not prevent the club from being relegated out of League One, and was released at the end of his contract after new manager Micky Mellon finished evaluating his squad.

=== Scunthorpe United ===
Anyon was in talks to join Cardiff City. The move was delayed whilst he underwent three operations to correct his Wolff–Parkinson–White syndrome. After he recovered, the deal was cancelled because manager Ole Gunnar Solskjær was no longer with Cardiff. He instead joined League One side Crewe Alexandra on non-contract terms on 16 January 2015. Ten days later he signed a contract with League One rivals Scunthorpe United to run until the end of the 2014–15 season. Manager Mark Robins found Anyon through goalkeeping coach Paul Musselwhite, and said that Anyon would be back-up for fellow new-signing Luke Daniels, with Sam Slocombe and James Severn both out injured with broken arms. He did not make a first-team appearance. However, he was still signed to a new two-year deal in May 2015, whilst Slocombe and Severn were released.

He made nine appearances in the 2015–16 season and was praised for his professionalism by manager Graham Alexander. Luke Daniels broke his ribs at the end of March 2017, leaving Anyon to fill his place for the rest of the 2016–17 season. He immediately won a place on the Football League Team of the Week following a man of the match performance in a 1–0 win over Burton Albion at Glanford Park on 9 April. The "Iron" went on to qualify for the play-offs. Alexander praised Anyon for keeping a clean sheet in the semi-final first leg at The Den, however, Millwall won the return leg 3–2 to eliminate Scunthorpe. He was released in May 2017.

=== Chesterfield ===
Anyon signed a two-year contract with newly relegated EFL League Two side Chesterfield in May 2017. Manager Gary Caldwell said that he had been keen to sign Anyon due in part to his ability to play the ball out with his feet, which suited the style of football Caldwell hoped to instil in the "Spireites". On 5 December he broke his arm during a 2–0 defeat at Fleetwood Town after a collision with Alex Reid; this left manager Jack Lester having to search for an emergency goalkeeper to come in on loan. Chesterfield had been relegated out of the English Football League by the time Anyon had returned to fitness at the end of the 2017–18 season. The new manager Martin Allen made him available for a free transfer in May 2018. He remained at the Proact Stadium however, featuring just twice at the end of the 2018–19 season after new manager John Sheridan decided to "repay" him for his positive attitude in helping new goalkeeper Shwan Jalal in training, saying "I don't care what other people think of him, I believe in him". Anyon was also chosen to carry the coffin of Gordon Banks at his funeral in March. Anyon was released by Chesterfield in May 2019.

=== Chorley ===
Anyon joined National League side Chorley in July 2019. He made just four appearances for the "Magpies" in the 2019–20 season, which was permanently suspended on 26 March due to the COVID-19 pandemic in England, with Chorley bottom of the table.

== Career statistics ==
Appearances and goals by club, season and competition
Club	Season	League			FA Cup		League Cup		Other		Total	
Club	Season	Division	Apps	Goals	Apps	Goals	Apps	Goals	Apps	Goals	Apps	Goals
Port Vale	2004–05	League One	0	0	0	0	0	0	0	0	0	0
Port Vale	2005–06	League One	0	0	0	0	0	0	0	0	0	0
Port Vale	2006–07	League One	22	0	0	0	0	0	1 (Note: Appearance(s) in Football League Trophy)	0	23	0
Port Vale	2007–08	League One	44	0	3	0	1	0	1	0	49	0
Port Vale	2008–09	League Two	36	0	2	0	1	0	0	0	39	0
Port Vale	2009–10	League Two	7	0	0	0	0	0	0	0	7	0
Port Vale	Total		109	0	5	0	2	0	2	0	118	0
Stafford Rangers (loan)	2004–05	Conference North	5	0	0	0	—		0	0	5	0
Stafford Rangers (loan)	2005–06	Conference North	5	0	0	0	—		0	0	5	0
Stafford Rangers (loan)	Total		10	0	0	0	0	0	0	0	10	0
Harrogate Town (loan)	2005–06	Conference North	11	0	0	0	—		0	0	11	0
Lincoln City	2010–11	League Two	21	0	3	0	1	0	0	0	25	0
Lincoln City	2011–12	Conference National	38	0	1	0	0	0	3 (Note: Appearances in FA Trophy)	0	42	0
Lincoln City	Total		59	0	4	0	1	0	3	0	67	0
Morecambe (loan)	2010–11	League Two	4	0	—		—		—		4	0
Shrewsbury Town	2012–13	League One	0	0	0	0	0	0	1	0	1	0
Shrewsbury Town	2013–14	League One	11	0	0	0	0	0	1	0	12	0
Shrewsbury Town	Total		11	0	0	0	0	0	2	0	13	0
Macclesfield Town (loan)	2012–13	Conference National	0	0	1	0	—		—		1	0
Crewe Alexandra	2014–15	League One	0	0	—		—		—		0	0
Scunthorpe United	2014–15	League One	0	0	—		—		—		0	0
Scunthorpe United	2015–16	League One	8	0	0	0	1	0	0	0	9	0
Scunthorpe United	2016–17	League One	8	0	0	0	0	0	7 (Note: 5 appearances in the EFL Trophy and 2 appearances in play-offs)	0	15	0
Scunthorpe United	Total		16	0	0	0	1	0	7	0	24	0
Chesterfield	2017–18	League Two	14	0	1	0	1	0	4 (Note: Appearances in EFL Trophy)	0	20	0
Chesterfield	2018–19	National League	2	0	0	0	—		0	0	2	0
Chesterfield	Total		16	0	1	0	1	0	4	0	22	0
Chorley	2019–20	National League	4	0	0	0	—		0	0	4	0
Career total			240	0	11	0	5	0	18	0	274	0

== Honours ==
Individual

- Port Vale Player of the Year: 2008–09
- Lincoln City Player of the Season: 2011–12
