= Anthony Griffith (footballer) =

Montserratian association football player

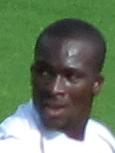
- Griffith at Vale Park (September 2010).

Personal information
- Full name: Anthony James Griffith
- Date of birth: 28 October 1986 (age 39)
- Place of birth: Huddersfield, England
- Height: 6 ft 0 in (1.83 m)
- Position: Defensive midfielder

Youth career
- Glasshoughton Welfare
- 2005–2006: Doncaster Rovers

Senior career*
Years	Team	Apps	(Gls)
2006–2008	Doncaster Rovers	6	(0)
2006	→ Oxford United (loan)	0	(0)
2006–2007	→ Darlington (loan)	4	(0)
2007	→ Stafford Rangers (loan)	20	(0)
2007–2008	→ Halifax Town (loan)	37	(4)
2008–2012	Port Vale	161	(2)
2012–2013	Leyton Orient	21	(0)
2013	→ Port Vale (loan)	10	(0)
2013–2014	Port Vale	38	(0)
2014	Harrogate Town	1	(0)
2014	Shrewsbury Town	5	(0)
2015	Carlisle United	11	(0)
2015	Altrincham	1	(0)
2016–2017	Glossop North End	25	(0)
2017	Trafford	9	(0)
2017	Colwyn Bay		
2017–2020	Congleton Town	67	(0)
Total		408	(6)

International career
2011–2015	Montserrat	4	(0)

Managerial career
- 2019–2020: Congleton Town (joint-manager)
- * Club domestic league appearances and goals

Anthony James Griffith (born 28 October 1986) is a former professional footballer and coach who is the assistant manager at Northern Premier League Division One West club Congleton Town. He was noted as a tough tackling defensive midfielder, though at times, this led to him having a poor disciplinary record. Born in England, he represented the Montserrat national team.

Impressing at non-League Glasshoughton Welfare, he turned professional with Doncaster Rovers in 2005. Used sparingly in 2005–06, he was loaned out to Oxford United in March 2006, though he did not make it onto the pitch. In 2006–07, he was loaned out to Darlington and Stafford Rangers before he spent the 2007–08 campaign on loan at Halifax Town. In April 2008, he signed with Port Vale and became a first-team regular in 2008–09. He remained a key first-team figure in 2009–10 and 2010–11 and was voted the club's Player of the Year in 2010. He continued to impress for the "Valiants" and earned a move up a division to Leyton Orient in May 2012. He returned to Port Vale on loan in March 2013 and helped the club to secure promotion out of League Two in 2012–13 before re-joining permanently in the summer. He signed with Shrewsbury Town in August 2014 before moving on to Carlisle United in January 2015. Six months later, he signed for Altrincham before retiring in September 2015 due to a hip injury. He came out of retirement to sign for Glossop North End in September 2016. In 2017, he played for Trafford, Colwyn Bay, and Congleton Town.

He served as Congleton Town's joint-manager from November 2019 to April 2020. He began coaching at Port Vale in October 2020 and joined Congleton Town as a coach three years later.

== Club career ==
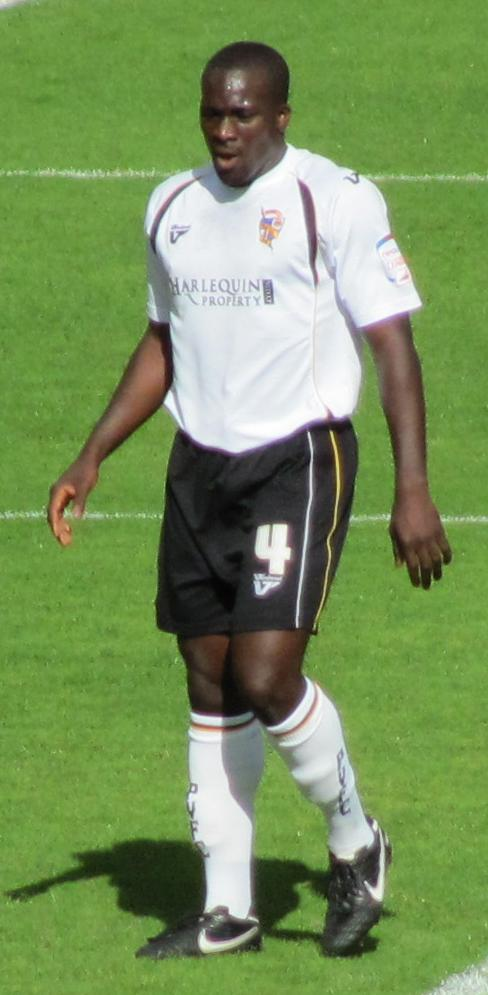
Griffith helping Port Vale to a 1–0 victory over Aldershot Town in September 2010.

As a youth, Griffith played for Stile Common alongside Cameron Jerome, Fraizer Campbell, and Reuben Noble-Lazarus, who all went on to enjoy careers as professional players. Griffith and Jerome also played for Yorkshire Counties. Griffith went on to play for Glasshoughton Welfare, where he would win the Castleford FA Challenge Cup with the under-19 team.

=== Doncaster Rovers ===
Griffith signed with Doncaster Rovers in 2005. However, he never made it as a regular first-team player at "Donny" and was instead loaned out to four lower league clubs over two years. On 21 March 2006, he joined Oxford United on a month-long loan. However, he never made it onto the pitch for the League Two side.

On 23 November 2007, he joined Darlington, again of League Two, on another one month. He made four appearances for the club. He then spent three months with Conference club Stafford Rangers from 26 January 2007, making a total of twenty appearances. Despite only featuring in the first two rounds of the competition, he received a Football League Trophy winners medal after Doncaster won the 2007 final. He then spent the entire 2007–08 season on loan at Halifax Town. He made close to forty appearances before returning to Doncaster, where he was subsequently released. Speaking after Griffith was sent off for the third time during his loan spell, Halifax manager Chris Wilder said: "We were looking to take him permanently but I won't be now".

=== Port Vale ===
Griffith was signed by Port Vale manager Lee Sinnott in April 2008. He spent much of the 2008–09 season at right-back under new manager Dean Glover. For the 2009–10 season, new manager Micky Adams elected to return Griffith to the role of 'midfield enforcer'. He was transfer listed in late September, along with the entire Port Vale squad, after Adams saw his team slip to a third consecutive defeat. He remained in the first-team however, and was playing in the form of his life under Adams, striking up a midfield pairing with Tommy Fraser, who he also shared a house with. His committed performances made him "a darling of the terraces", though he also picked up 14 yellow cards throughout the season. At the end of the season he was offered a two-year contract, and was given the Player of the Year award. He duly signed the contract.

"I was playing out of position in my first season, and this year it was just a case of proving that I can play in the middle of midfield."

— Griffith explains his motivation to perform in 2009–10.

On 28 August 2010, Griffith scored from 25 yards (23 m) at Vale Park past Torquay United's Scott Bevan in a 2–1 reverse. The goal would prove to be more important to Griffith himself and the Torquay opposition than to his club, the fine strike his first in the Football League, and his first in Port Vale colours. It also ended the Gulls' run without conceding a league goal at the 998-minute mark, a club record but not a Football League record. He started the season strongly, forming a solid midfield partnership with Gary Roberts. Despite losing his place to Doug Loft following an injury that kept him sidelined for a month, he returned to post 45 appearances in 2010–11.

He retained his first-team place at the start of the 2011–12 campaign and refused to put his international career ahead of his club career. On 14 October, he marked his 150th appearance for the "Valiants" with his second Football League goal – a 35-yard strike past Northampton Town. His good form caused assistant manager Mark Grew to worry that other clubs at a higher level might wish to sign him. He was named in the League Two Team of the Week for his performance in the 1–0 win over Rotherham United at the Don Valley Stadium on 21 January. At the end of the season, the club's female support voted him "Mr Shirt of the Back", breaking Louis Dodds' three-year run. He played 47 of Vale's 50 games, having been denied the chance to become an ever-present due to suspensions resulting from his eleven bookings.

=== Leyton Orient ===
In May 2012, out-of-contract Griffith was reported to have been a target for Leyton Orient, Shrewsbury Town, Northampton Town and Bradford City; he was also offered an improved contract at Port Vale. He proved unable to turn down the offer of League One football, and quickly signed a two-year deal with Leyton Orient. Manager Russell Slade signed Griffith as a replacement for departing captain Stephen Dawson, and reportedly doubled his wages to tempt him down south to Brisbane Road.

"Leyton Orient have some fantastic players and you're bound to pick things up from training and playing with them every day. I think I've taken a lot from the experience and I'm a much better player now than I was last summer."

— Griffith's spell at Brisbane Road proved to be a big learning curve.

=== Return to Port Vale ===
He returned to Port Vale on loan in March 2013 until the end of the 2012–13 season. After a slow start, he soon returned to top form. He won plaudits and man of the match awards for his performances. He made ten appearances during his loan spell, helping the club to win promotion into League One with a third-place finish in League Two. He re-joined Port Vale permanently in July 2013, signing a one-year contract. He went on to build an impressive partnership in midfield with Chris Lines in the 2013–14 season; Griffith providing the tough-tackling and Lines providing the creative playmaking. Despite making 45 appearances across the season he was not offered a new contract in the summer. In summer 2014 Griffith had a trial with League Two club Mansfield Town. He later returned to Vale Park to train, with coach Mark Grew saying "The manager is always ready to help someone like Griff who has been such a good servant to the club." He was voted onto Port Vale's team of the 2010s by readers of The Sentinel, alongside Doug Loft, in February 2020.

=== Later career ===
Griffith joined Harrogate Town in the Conference North on 22 August 2014. He played one match, against Barrow, but left after just five days at the club when it emerged he had a clause in his contract allowing him to move back into full-time football should a league club make an approach, which had been invoked by Shrewsbury Town. On 27 August 2014, Griffith signed for League Two club Shrewsbury Town on a one-year contract, citing manager Micky Mellon as a major reason for his decision to join the club. Described as "being popular in the dressing room", he became a fringe players, making only six first-team appearances for the "Shrews". In January 2015, Griffith signed an 18-month contract with League Two side Carlisle United. He helped the "Cumbrians" to avoid relegation out of the Football League at the end of the 2014–15 season, making 11 appearances either side of his international commitments which manager Keith Curle kept a secret from the media to avoid tipping off opposition teams as to Griffith's absence. He was transfer listed by Curle in May 2015, and released from his contract two months later.

In July 2015, Griffith signed a one-year deal with National League side Altrincham in a move that reunited him with his former Vale boss Lee Sinnott. He played one game for the "Robins" before retiring due to a hip injury in September 2015. He returned to football in September 2016 after signing for Northern Premier League Division One North side Glossop North End. He was voted as the club's Player of the Month for November 2016 by supporters. He signed with divisional rivals Trafford in March 2017, who ended the 2016–17 campaign in sixth-place, two points outside the play-offs. Griffith signed with Northern Premier League Division One North club Colwyn Bay as a player-coach in May 2017. Six months later he joined North West Counties League Premier Division side Congleton Town. He made 19 appearances for the "Bears" in the second half of the 2017–18 campaign. He featured 45 times during the 2018–19 season, helping Congleton to a third-place finish. Due to the COVID-19 pandemic in England, the 2019–20 season was formally abandoned on 26 March, with all results from the season being expunged.

== International career ==
Griffith was raised in the Brackenhall area of Huddersfield, but qualified for the Montserrat national side through his Montserrat-born father. He received his international call-up in June 2011 to compete in the nation's World Cup qualifying campaign, despite never having visited the tiny island nation of 4,600 inhabitants. He was also appointed as team captain. Most of his teammates were amateur players. Before his call-up Montserrat had recorded only two victories in their 25-game history, both coming against Anguilla in 1995. His debut came against Belize, who beat Montserrat 5–2 at Ato Boldon Stadium in Couva, Trinidad and Tobago on 15 June. The second leg was postponed over FIFA's concerns with the Belize government, leaving the possibility of a bye for Montserrat. However, the match was rescheduled, and Belize progressed with a 3–1 win (8–3 on aggregate).

== Coaching career ==
In September 2018, Griffith began coaching the under-14s at the Port Vale Academy. He was also appointed as first-team coach at Congleton Town two months later. On 7 November 2019, he was appointed as Congleton Town's joint-manager, alongside Phil Hadland. The duo were replaced by Ryan Austin on 29 April 2020, with Griffith remaining as a player-coach. He was appointed as a professional development phase lead coach at Port Vale in October 2020. Interim manager Danny Pugh had to start self-isolation after testing positive for COVID-19 on 18 January 2021, leaving Griffith, Frank Sinclair and Billy Paynter to take over first-team duties in his absence. He was appointed as assistant manager to Richard Duffy at Congleton Town, who were crowned Midland League Premier Division champions at the end of the 2023–24 season. He began training to be a referee in September 2024.

== Style of play ==
Griffith was usually a popular player with fans due to his 'tigerish displays'. However, this also left him with a poor disciplinary record. He was best suited to the right-back or midfield position. He struggled with his inconsistent and at times inaccurate distribution skills, though he had a decent passing range. He was praised for his tremendous work ethic by Port Vale's assistant manager Mark Grew. He admitted to not training very well, saying that this was due to him putting so much work into his performances in matches every week.

"Griff is tenacious, he likes a tackle and he's got a great engine. Certainly, with Griff, we know he's going to give us 100 per cent effort, he's going to win his tackles and get around the pitch – I like that."

— Port Vale boss Micky Adams explains the appeal of having Griffith in the first XI.

In addition to his on-the-pitch skills, he was considered a good character. Micky Adams declared, "he's a great character, a good bloke, and you can rely on him. If my daughter came home with him, I'd be delighted."

== Personal life ==
Griffith has a daughter, Mya Rose Griffith, born in early 2011. He is a cousin of Grenadian international striker Delroy Facey, and Delroy's brother Danny. He also has a lot of relatives in Jamaica.

== Career statistics ==
=== Club statistics ===
Appearances and goals by club, season and competition
Club	Season	League			FA Cup		League Cup		Other		Total	
Club	Season	Division	Apps	Goals	Apps	Goals	Apps	Goals	Apps	Goals	Apps	Goals
Doncaster Rovers	2005–06	League One	4	0	0	0	0	0	0	0	4	0
Doncaster Rovers	2006–07	League One	2	0	0	0	1	0	2 (Note: Appearance(s) in the EFL Trophy.)	0	5	0
Doncaster Rovers	2007–08	League One	0	0	0	0	0	0	0	0	0	0
Doncaster Rovers	Doncaster Rovers total		6	0	0	0	1	0	2	0	9	0
Oxford United (loan)	2005–06	League Two	0	0	—		—		—		0	0
Darlington (loan)	2006–07	League Two	4	0	0	0	0	0	0	0	4	0
Stafford Rangers (loan)	2006–07	Conference National	20	0	0	0	—		0	0	20	0
Halifax Town (loan)	2007–08	Conference National	37	4	1	0	—		1 (Note: Appearance(s) in the Conference League Cup.)	0	39	4
Port Vale	2008–09	League Two	38	0	2	0	1	0	1	0	42	0
Port Vale	2009–10	League Two	40	0	3	0	3	0	2	0	48	0
Port Vale	2010–11	League Two	40	1	2	0	2	0	1	0	45	1
Port Vale	2011–12	League Two	43	1	2	0	1	0	1	0	47	1
Leyton Orient	2012–13	League One	21	0	1	0	2	0	4	0	28	0
Port Vale	2012–13	League Two	10	0	0	0	0	0	0	0	10	0
Port Vale	2013–14	League One	38	0	5	0	1	0	1	0	45	0
Port Vale	Port Vale total		209	2	14	0	8	0	6	0	237	2
Harrogate Town	2014–15	Conference North	1	0	0	0	—		0	0	1	0
Shrewsbury Town	2014–15	League Two	5	0	0	0	0	0	1	0	6	0
Carlisle United	2014–15	League Two	11	0	—		—		—		11	0
Altrincham	2015–16	National League	1	0	0	0	—		0	0	1	0
Glossop North End	2016–17	Northern Premier League; Division One North	24	0	0	0	0	0	7 (Note: Appearances in FA Trophy, Manchester Premier Cup, Derbyshire Senior Cup, and NPL League Cup)	0	31	0
Congleton Town	2017–18	North West Counties League; Premier Division	19	0	0	0	0	0	0	0	19	0
Congleton Town	2018–19	North West Counties League; Premier Division	33	0	3	0	5	0	4 (Note: Appearances in FA Vase and Cheshire Senior Cup)	0	45	0
Congleton Town	2019–20	North West Counties League; Premier Division	13	0	2	0	0	0	4	0	19	0
Congleton Town	2020–21	North West Counties League; Premier Division	2	0	2	0	0	0	0	0	4	0
Congleton Town	Congleton Town total		67	0	7	0	5	0	8	0	87	0
Career total (Note: Statistics for Trafford and Colwyn Bay not known.)			408	6	23	0	16	0	29	0	476	6

=== International statistics ===
Montserrat national team
Year	Apps	Goals
2011	2	0
2015	2	0
Total	4	0

== Honours ==
Doncaster Rovers

- Football League Trophy: 2006–07

Port Vale

- Football League Two third-place promotion: 2012–13

Individual

- Port Vale Player of the Year: 2009–10
