= 2009–10 Port Vale F.C. season =

Port Vale F.C.
2009–10 season
- Owner: Valiant 2001
- Chairman: Bill Bratt
- Manager: Micky Adams
- Stadium: Vale Park
- Football League Two: 10th (68 points)
- FA Cup: Second Round (eliminated by Huddersfield Town)
- League Cup: Third Round (eliminated by Scunthorpe United)
- Football League Trophy: Third Round (eliminated by Bradford City)
- Player of the Year: Anthony Griffith
- Top goalscorer: League: Marc Richards (19); All: Marc Richards (22)
- Highest home attendance: 8,467 vs. Shrewsbury Town, 8 May 2010
- Lowest home attendance: 3,154 vs. Stockport County, 6 September 2009
- Average home league attendance: 4,939
- Biggest win: 5–0 vs. Chesterfield, 13 March 2010
- Biggest defeat: 0–4 vs. Bournemouth, 1 May 2010
Home colours	Away colours

The 2009–10 season was Port Vale's 98th season of football in the English Football League, and second-successive season in League Two. Having narrowly avoided relegation the previous season, the club entered the new campaign under the management of Micky Adams, who was appointed partway through the previous year. Adams made sweeping changes in the summer, releasing several players and bringing in key additions that helped establish a more resilient and competitive squad.

Port Vale began the season with steady, if unspectacular, form, drawing many of their early fixtures but proving difficult to beat. A strong run of results around the turn of the year pushed the club into the top half of the table, and they remained in contention for a play-off spot until the closing weeks. Ultimately, they finished 10th, their best league position since relegation from League One in 2007–08, and a significant improvement over their 18th-place finish the year before. The defence was notably improved, conceding fewer goals than any other side outside the top seven.

In cup competitions, Vale performed admirably in the League Cup, eliminating Championship clubs Sheffield United and Sheffield Wednesday before a narrow defeat to Premier League side Scunthorpe United in the Third Round. The club also reached the Second Round of the FA Cup, losing to Huddersfield Town, and exited the Football League Trophy in the Third Round after a defeat to Bradford City. Marc Richards led the scoring charts with 23 goals in all competitions, while tough-tackling midfielder Anthony Griffith was named Player of the Year for his consistency and work rate across the campaign.

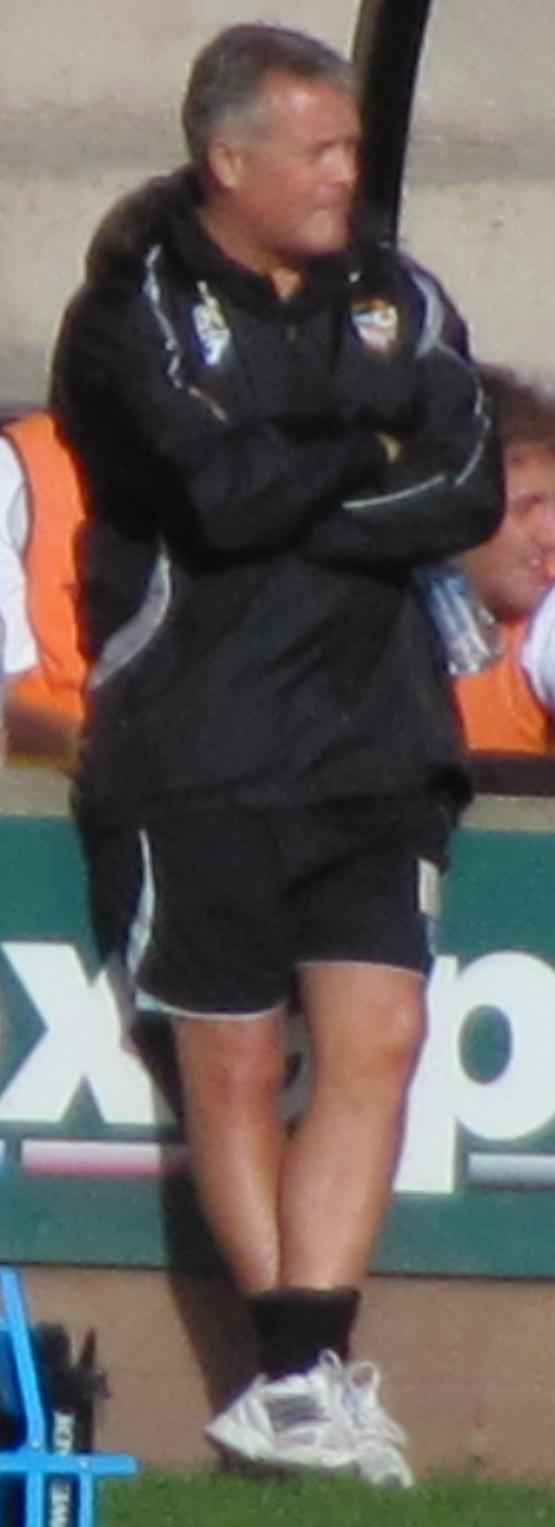
Manager Micky Adams.

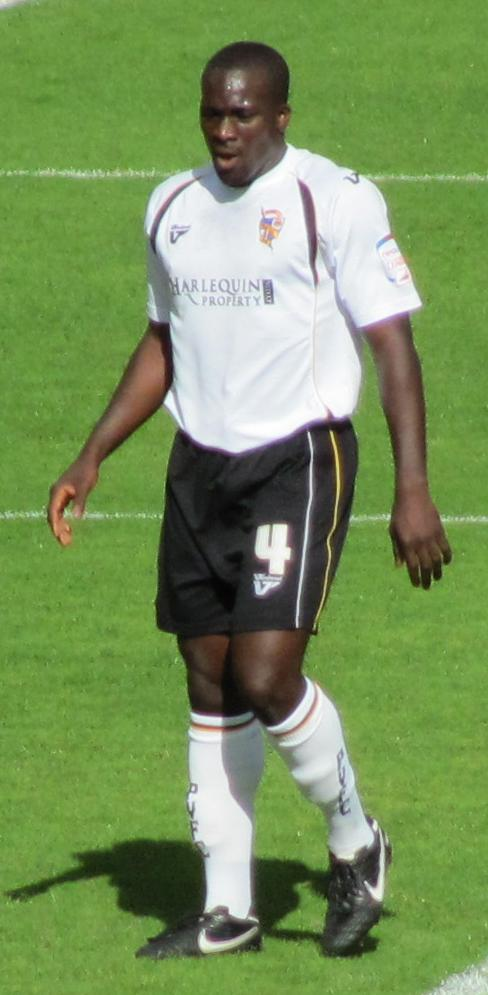
Combative midfielder Anthony Griffith was Player of the Season.

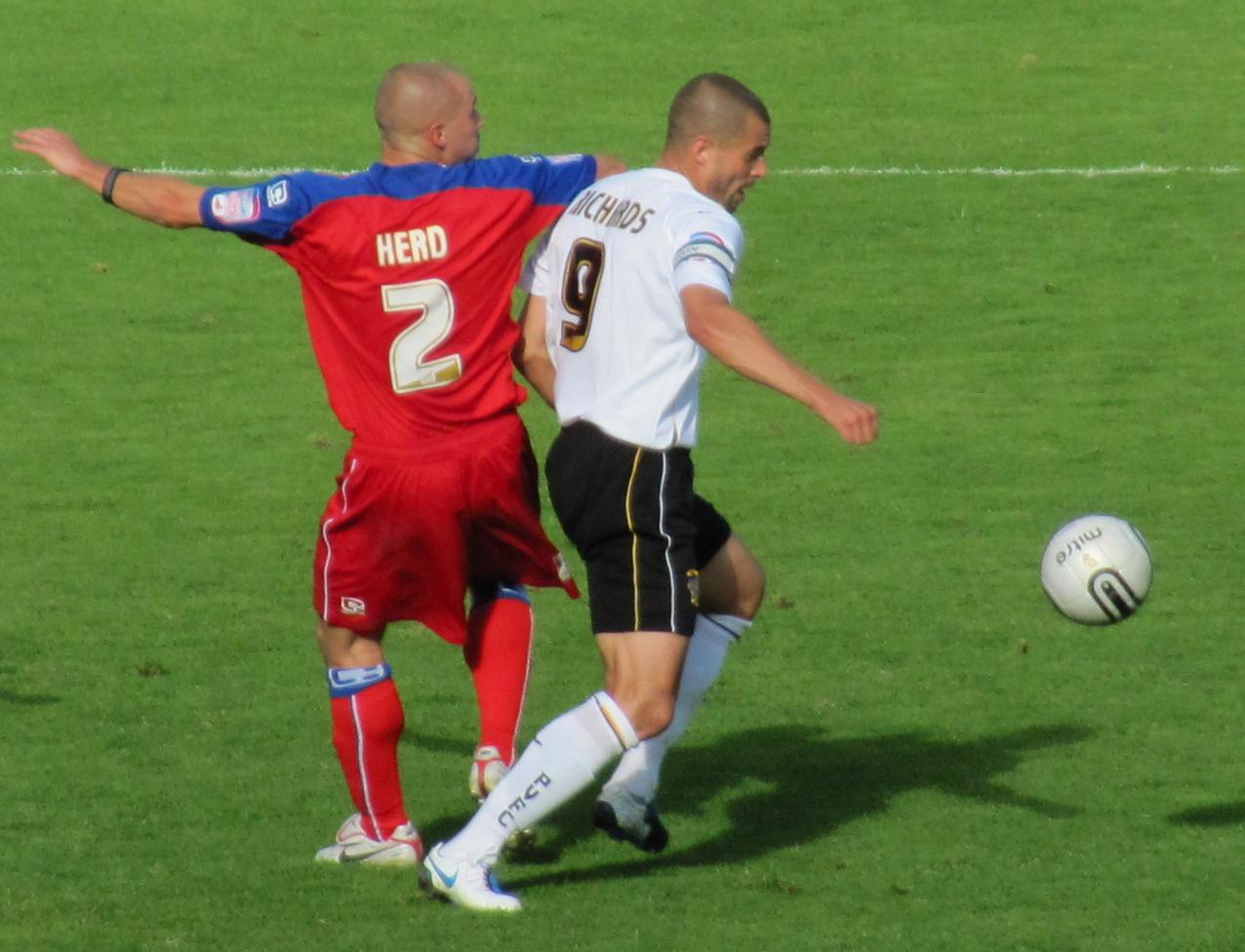
Top-scorer Marc Richards scored a hat-trick past Chesterfield.

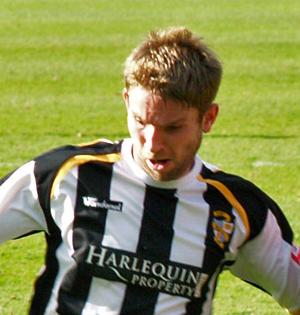
John McCombe became a fan favourite.

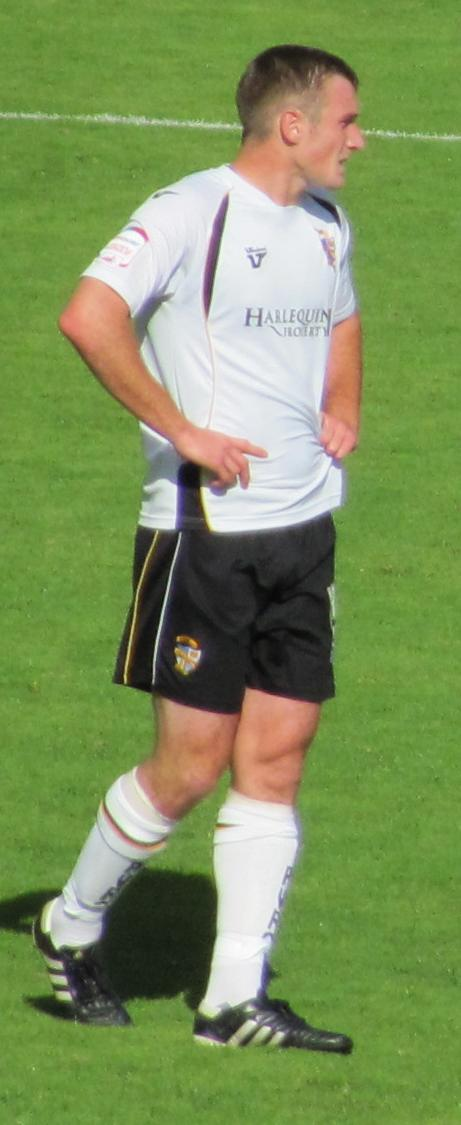
Young defender Lee Collins had an excellent season.

== Overview ==
=== League Two ===
The pre-season saw a new manager appointed – experienced 47-year-old Micky Adams arrived at Vale Park on 5 June 2009. Chairman Bill Bratt stated that Adams' goal would be to stabilize the club, a point reiterated by observers such as Robbie Earle, as well as Adams himself. He made his first signing on 15 June, bringing 21-year-old Tommy Fraser to the club on a free transfer, who had played for Adams at Brighton. He appointed Fraser as club captain. After confirming the signing of Adam Yates, who was linked to the club before Adams' arrival, Adams signed Doug Loft, who had also played under him at Brighton. After a pre-season friendly, Adams considered switching to a 3–5–2 formation for the season. On 21 July, it was announced that Adams had appointed veteran striker Geoff Horsfield as player-assistant manager. He was still strengthening his squad early in the season, signing midfielders Jason Jarrett, Kris Taylor and Claus Bech Jørgensen on short-term deals. He also signed Jamie Guy on loan from Colchester United, Damien McCrory on loan from Plymouth Argyle, and winger Lewis Haldane from Bristol Rovers – Haldane would later make the move permanent in January. To raise cash he placed six youngsters on the transfer list.

The season started with just one defeat in the first seven league games, demonstrating how Adams had made his side difficult to beat. Joe Anyon returned to fitness to play a reserve team game on 23 September, but failed to displace teenager Chris Martin. After a period of three defeats in seven days, including being knocked out of the League Cup at the third round, Adams decided to place his whole squad on the transfer list, saying of his team's performance: "We looked like a woman who had a big fur coat on but underneath she’s got no knickers on." It was a controversial move, one that divided opinion among analysts and fans, also bringing the fourth-tier club to national attention. The move appeared to many to be a motivational tactic. He later admitted he merely played "a psychological game with them... [and] I don't think they fell for it – I don't think anybody fell for it". Luke Prosser and Danny Glover both were shipped off to Conference National side Salisbury City on one-month loan deals. Steve Thompson was released from his contract to join Telford United. Three wins – including a cup win over League One Stockport County and a league win at local rivals Crewe Alexandra – and three draws within four weeks saw Adams nominated for the League Two Manager of the Month award for October 2009. He signed a contract extension in November 2009, keeping him at the club until summer 2012.

"The vision that I share with the board and the supporters is to win promotion. I think it can be achieved. It's all about short steps. The first one was to stabilise and we've done that. The players have bought into my philosophy and the next stage is to win promotion and establish ourselves as a League One club."

— Adams planned to push for promotion the following season.

In November, Sam Stockley decided to retire on medical advice, having suffered an eye injury. However, he later joined Hungarian club Ferencvárosi TC as a player-coach. This allowed Adam Yates to make the right-back spot his own. Glover also left the club for a loan spell at Rochdale. Arriving at the club was Bristol Rovers loanee Sean Rigg, who would sign permanently at the season's end.

In the January 2010 transfer window, Adams signed Lewis Haldane permanently, with Sean Rigg and Craig Davies signing on loan. In February, Anyon returned to the starting line after young rival Martin was rested. He performed well over seven games but made two costly errors that resulted in two goals and dropped points in the play-off hunt. Thus he was consigned to the bench until the season's end. On 13 March, Vale won 5–0 away at Chesterfield in a game where Marc Richards was clapped off by the opposition supporters after scoring a hat-trick.

Luke Prosser, Danny Glover and Ross Davidson were also informed they would not be offered new contracts, and Prosser immediately joined James Lawrie on loan at Kidderminster Harriers. Both Glover and Davidson joined Stafford Rangers on loan. Adams' men stormed into the play-off places for the first time in the season with just two games left to play, following a 2–1 win over champions-elect Notts County. Yet with just one point from their final two games, the Vale finished just outside the play-off zone.

They finished in tenth place with 68 points, boasting the best goals conceded tally outside the top three. They were four points short of Dagenham & Redbridge in the play-off zone – who would go on to win the play-off final. Only runaway champions Notts County lost fewer games than Vale, though only Macclesfield Town and Cheltenham Town picked up more draws. Marc Richards was the club's top-scorer with 23 goals, more than double that of his nearest rival.

At the end of the season Joe Anyon was offered a new contract at Vale Park on reduced pay, but instead signed with Lincoln City. Chris Martin signed a new two-year contract, which came with an increase in wages. Released players moved on to other clubs: Luke Prosser (Southend United); Simon Richman and Danny Glover (Worcester City); David Howland (Glentoran); and James Lawrie (AFC Telford United). Ross Davidson also joined Stafford Rangers, after having spent much of the season loan at the club, as well as a brief time at Nantwich Town. Geoff Horsfield retired as a player to concentrate on his role as assistant manager.

=== Finances ===
On the financial side, rumours abounded. In July 2009, Bill Bratt spoke out to publicly deny rumours spread on Vale fan sites, specifically rumours of sponsorship deals with Basement Jaxx and Maplin Electronics. Bratt said the rumours were "inaccurate, spurious and damaging", claiming the speculation could damage genuine and confidential negotiations. In November, Bratt announced that he was planning to retire as chairman at the end of the season, though he later decided to stay on. Reports that Andy Townsend would be appointed as a football advisor also surfaced, but never transpired. There also came statements that shirt sponsors Harlequin Property would invest £500,000 into the club, though again, this never materialized. Stoke-on-Trent city council gave the club a two-year repayment holiday for a £2.25 million loan in 2005.

=== Cup competitions ===
In the FA Cup, Vale advanced past Stevenage after a replay, with a 1–0 win at Broadhall Way. This ended Stevenage's year-long unbeaten home record. They were then defeated 1–0 by League One Huddersfield Town in the second round.

In the League Cup, the club beat Championship side Sheffield United 2–1 at Bramall Lane in the first round. The Vale then defeated Sheffield Wednesday 2–0 in the second round, with goals from Adams' signing Kris Taylor and Rob Taylor – a player not appreciated under Dean Glover. It was only after this game that Adams signed his managerial contract – two months after taking charge. The delay was blamed on 'legal complications'. Vale then took another Championship side, Scunthorpe United, to extra time at Glanford Park, before succumbing to a 2–0 defeat.

In the Football League Trophy, Vale knocked out Stockport County with a 3–1 win before exiting in the third round after losing out to Bradford City at Valley Parade in a penalty shoot-out.

== Results ==
=== Football League Two ===
==== League table ====
Pos	Team	Pld	W	D	L	GF	GA	GD	Pts
8	Chesterfield	46	21	7	18	61	62	−1	70
9	Bury	46	19	12	15	54	59	−5	69
10	Port Vale	46	17	17	12	61	50	+11	68
11	Northampton Town	46	18	13	15	62	53	+9	67
12	Shrewsbury Town	46	17	12	17	55	54	+1	63

Updated to match(es) played on unknown. Source: football-league.co.uk

==== Results by matchday ====
Round	1	2	3	4	5	6	7	8	9	10	11	12	13	14	15	16	17	18	19	20	21	22	23	24	25	26	27	28	29	30	31	32	33	34	35	36	37	38	39	40	41	42	43	44	45	46
Ground	H	A	A	H	A	H	A	H	A	H	H	A	A	H	A	H	A	H	A	H	A	A	H	H	A	H	A	H	A	H	H	A	A	H	H	A	A	H	A	H	H	A	A	H	A	H
Result	D	D	L	W	D	W	D	L	L	D	D	W	W	D	D	L	D	D	W	L	D	W	W	D	D	W	L	L	W	L	W	L	W	L	W	W	D	L	W	W	D	W	D	W	L	D
Position	12	17	20	15	16	10	13	14	16	15	16	14	12	13	13	13	13	14	13	16	16	13	12	12	13	12	14	14	14	15	14	14	12	13	11	9	11	13	11	10	10	9	9	7	9	10
Points	1	2	2	5	6	9	10	10	10	11	12	15	18	19	20	20	21	22	25	25	26	29	32	33	34	37	37	37	40	40	43	43	46	46	49	52	53	53	56	59	60	63	64	67	67	68

Source: Statto
A = Away; H = Home; W = Win; D = Draw; L = Loss

==== Matches ====
8 August 2009 1	Port Vale	1–1	Rochdale	Burslem
	Richards 75' (pen.)	Report	Thompson 66'	Stadium: Vale Park; Attendance: 6,158; Referee: Jock Waugh

15 August 2009 2	Bradford City	0–0	Port Vale	Bradford
		Report		Stadium: Valley Parade; Attendance: 11,333; Referee: Dean Whitestone

18 August 2009 3	Macclesfield Town	2–0	Port Vale	Macclesfield
19:55 BST	Tipton 6'; Bencherif 68'	Report		Stadium: Moss Rose; Attendance: 3,433; Referee: Jarnail Singh

22 August 2009 4	Port Vale	1–0	Darlington	Burslem
	Richards 29'	Report		Stadium: Vale Park; Attendance: 4,561; Referee: Tierney

29 August 2009 5	Hereford United	2–2	Port Vale	Hereford
	Pugh 36'; Plummer 80' (pen.)	Report	Dodds 49'; R.Taylor 53'	Stadium: Edgar Street; Attendance: 2,434; Referee: Graham Scott

5 September 2009 6	Port Vale	4–0	Grimsby Town	Burslem
	Dodds 43'; Fraser 68'; Owen 87'; Collins 90'	Report		Stadium: Vale Park; Attendance: 5,056; Referee: Geoff Eltringham

12 September 2009 7	Aldershot Town	1–1	Port Vale	Aldershot
	Soares 38'	Report	R.Taylor 23'	Stadium: Recreation Ground; Attendance: 3,406; Referee: Phil Crossley

19 September 2009 8	Port Vale	0–1	Bury	Burslem
		Report	Lowe 8'	Stadium: Vale Park; Attendance: 5,461; Referee: Andy D'Urso

26 September 2009 9	Notts County	3–1	Port Vale	Nottingham
	Hughes 16', 45'	Report	Richards 44' (pen.)	Stadium: Meadow Lane; Attendance: 7,561; Referee: Anthony Taylor

29 September 2009 10	Port Vale	2–2	Accrington Stanley	Burslem
	Dodds 5'; Fraser 86'	Report	Edwards 82' (pen.); Procter 90'	Stadium: Vale Park; Attendance: 4,326; Referee: Darren Sheldrake

3 October 2009 11	Port Vale	0–0	AFC Bournemouth	Burslem
		Report		Stadium: Vale Park; Attendance: 4,905; Referee: Rob Shoebridge

10 October 2009 12	Shrewsbury Town	0–1	Port Vale	Shrewsbury
		Report	McCombe 45'	Stadium: New Meadow; Attendance: 7,096; Referee: Steve Bratt

17 October 2009 13	Crewe Alexandra	1–2	Port Vale	Crewe
	Miller 34'	Report	Richards 45'; K.Taylor 80'	Stadium: Gresty Road; Attendance: 6,943; Referee: Nigel Miller

24 October 2009 14	Port Vale	1–1	Cheltenham Town	Burslem
	Richards 9'	Report	Pook 66'	Stadium: Vale Park; Attendance: 4,979; Referee: Steven Cook

31 October 2009 15	Dagenham & Redbridge	1–1	Port Vale	Dagenham
	Scott 88'	Report	Dodds 38'	Stadium: Victoria Road; Attendance: 2,003; Referee: Roger East

14 November 2009 16	Port Vale	1–2	Rotherham United	Burslem
	Prosser 36'	Report	Brogan 31'; Law 90'	Stadium: Vale Park; Attendance: 4,788; Referee: Peter Quinn

21 November 2009 17	Barnet	0–0	Port Vale	Chipping Barnet, London
		Report		Stadium: Underhill Stadium; Attendance: 1,939; Referee: Fred Graham

24 November 2009 18	Port Vale	2–2	Torquay United	Burslem
	Loft 11'; R.Taylor 76'	Report	Wroe 17'; Rendell 67'	Stadium: Vale Park; Attendance: 3,996; Referee: Jon Moss

1 December 2009 19	Lincoln City	1–2	Port Vale	Lincoln
	Martin 47' (og.)	Report	Richards 40'; Dodds 59'	Stadium: Sincil Bank; Attendance: 2,569; Referee: Russell Booth

5 December 2009 20	Port Vale	0–2	Morecambe	Burslem
		Report	Jevons 1'; Mullin 39'	Stadium: Vale Park; Attendance: 4,679; Referee: Keith Stroud

12 December 2009 21	Northampton Town	1–1	Port Vale	Northampton
	Akinfenwa 51' (pen.)	Report	Richards 45' (pen.)	Stadium: Sixfields Stadium; Attendance: 4,132; Referee: Mick Russell

28 December 2009 22	Grimsby Town	1–2	Port Vale	Cleethorpes
	Conlon 90' (pen.)	Report	Rigg 7'; R.Taylor 41'	Stadium: Blundell Park; Attendance: 4,401; Referee: Gary Sutton

19 January 2010 23	Port Vale	3–1	Burton Albion	Burslem
	Richards 7', 85' (pen.); Rigg 25'	Report	Harrad 15' (pen.)	Stadium: Vale Park; Attendance: 4,458; Referee: Geoff Eltringham

23 January 2010 24	Port Vale	0–0	Macclesfield Town	Burslem
		Report		Stadium: Vale Park; Attendance: 5,167; Referee: Pat Miller

26 January 2010 25	Rochdale	0–0	Port Vale	Rochdale
		Report		Stadium: Spotland Stadium; Attendance: 3,081; Referee: Craig Pawson

30 January 2010 26	Port Vale	2–0	Hereford United	Burslem
	Davies 9'; Richards 90'	Report		Stadium: Vale Park; Attendance: 4,686; Referee: Graham Horwood

6 February 2010 27	Burton Albion	1–0	Port Vale	Burton upon Trent
	Maghoma 39'	Report		Stadium: Pirelli Stadium; Attendance: 4,644; Referee: Phil Crossley

9 February 2010 28	Port Vale	1–2	Chesterfield	Burslem
	Davies 49'	Report	Downes 10'; Green 31'	Stadium: Vale Park; Attendance: 4,090; Referee: Paul Taylor

13 February 2010 29	Torquay United	1–2	Port Vale	Torquay
	Benyon 58'	Report	Haldane 42'; Richards 67'	Stadium: Plainmoor; Attendance: 2,563; Referee: Graham Scott

20 February 2010 30	Port Vale	0–2	Barnet	Burslem
		Report	O'Flynn 8', 84'	Stadium: Vale Park; Attendance: 4,571; Referee: Carl Dunn

23 February 2010 31	Lincoln City	0–4	Port Vale	Lincoln
		Report	Pearce 1' (og.); R.Taylor 3'; Davies 15'; McCombe 69'	Stadium: Sincil Bank; Attendance: 3,231; Referee: Phil Gibbs

27 February 2010 32	Morecambe	1–0	Port Vale	Morecambe
	Jevons 20'	Report		Stadium: Christie Park; Attendance: 2,064; Referee: Jock Waugh

2 March 2010 33	Darlington	1–3	Port Vale	Darlington
	Purcell 6'	Report	Loft 67'; Dodds 72'; Haldane 81'	Stadium: The Darlington Arena; Attendance: 1,582; Referee: Mark Haywood

6 March 2010 34	Port Vale	1–3	Northampton Town	Burslem
	Loft 5'	Report	Akinfenwa 3'; McKay 45'; Osman 45'	Stadium: Vale Park; Attendance: 4,861; Referee: David Webb

9 March 2010 35	Port Vale	2–1	Bradford City	Burslem
	Richards 50'; R.Taylor 78'	Report	Threlfall 12'	Stadium: Vale Park; Attendance: 3,728; Referee: Neil Swarbrick

13 March 2010 36	Chesterfield	0–5	Port Vale	Chesterfield, Derbyshire
		Report	R.Taylor 19'; Richards 44', 51', 79'; Davies 85' (pen.)	Stadium: Saltergate; Attendance: 4,138; Referee: Paul Tierney

20 March 2010 37	Cheltenham Town	1–1	Port Vale	Cheltenham
	Elito 40'	Report	McCombe 8'	Stadium: Whaddon Road; Attendance: 3,503; Referee: Gavin Ward

27 March 2010 38	Port Vale	0–1	Crewe Alexandra	Burslem
		Report	Miller 60' (pen.)	Stadium: Vale Park; Attendance: 7,232; Referee: Chris Sarginson

3 April 2010 39	Rotherham United	1–2	Port Vale	Sheffield
	Walker 81'	Report	Davies 59'; Richards 62'	Stadium: Don Valley Stadium; Attendance: 3,721; Referee: Mark Halsey

5 April 2010 40	Port Vale	3–1	Dagenham & Redbridge	Burslem
15:00 GMT	Haldane 43'; R.Taylor 74'; Davies 78'	Report	Pack 15'	Stadium: Vale Park; Attendance: 4,572; Referee: Gary Sutton

10 April 2010 41	Port Vale	1–1	Aldershot Town	Burslem
	Rigg 72'	Report	Morgan 63'	Stadium: Vale Park; Attendance: 5,399; Referee: Dean Whitestone

13 April 2010 42	Accrington Stanley	1–2	Port Vale	Accrington
	Grant 52'	Report	Davies 35'; K.Taylor 65'	Stadium: Crown Ground; Attendance: 2,205; Referee: Jon Moss

17 April 2010 43	Bury	1–1	Port Vale	Bury, Greater Manchester
	Sodje 82'	Report	Richards 30' (pen.)	Stadium: Gigg Lane; Attendance: 4,570; Referee: Dave Foster

24 April 2010 44	Port Vale	2–1	Notts County	Burslem
	Richards 20'; K.Taylor 30'	Report	Lee 25'	Stadium: Vale Park; Attendance: 7,459; Referee: Karl Evans

1 May 2010 45	AFC Bournemouth	4–0	Port Vale	Bournemouth
	Pitman 53'; Connell 76', 81'; McQuoid 86'	Report		Stadium: Dean Court; Attendance: 9,055; Referee: Simon Hooper

8 May 2010 46	Port Vale	1–1	Shrewsbury Town	Burslem
	Richards 77' (pen.)	Report	Bright 11'	Stadium: Vale Park; Attendance: 8,467; Referee: Keith Hill

=== FA Cup ===
7 November 2009 R1	Port Vale	1–1	Stevenage	Burslem
	Yates 42'	Report	Griffin 90'	Stadium: Vale Park; Attendance: 3,999; Referee: Craig Pawson

17 November 2009 Replay	Stevenage	0–1	Port Vale	Stevenage
		Report	Dodds 24'	Stadium: Broadhall Way; Attendance: 2,914; Referee: Jarnail Singh

28 November 2009 R2	Port Vale	0–1	Huddersfield Town	Burslem
		Report	Clarke 12'	Stadium: Vale Park; Attendance: 5,311; Referee: Carl Boyeson

=== League Cup ===
11 August 2009 R1	Sheffield United	1–2	Port Vale	Sheffield
	Sharp	Report	Richards 20', 61'	Stadium: Bramall Lane; Attendance: 7,627; Referee: Keith Hill

25 August 2009 R2	Port Vale	2–0	Sheffield Wednesday	Burslem
	K.Taylor 63'; R.Taylor 65'	Report		Stadium: Vale Park; Attendance: 6,667; Referee: Graham Salisbury

22 September 2009 R3	Scunthorpe United	2–0 (a.e.t.)	Port Vale	Scunthorpe
	Hayes 92'; McCann 95'	Report		Stadium: Glanford Park; Attendance: 3,383; Referee: Steve Tanner

=== Football League Trophy ===
6 October 2009 R2	Port Vale	3–1	Stockport County	Burslem
	Haldane 4'; Dodds 7'; Richards 13'	Report	Bridcutt 22'	Stadium: Vale Park; Attendance: 3,154; Referee: Simon Hooper

10 November 2009 R3	Bradford City	2–2 (a.e.t.) (3–4 p)	Port Vale	Bradford
	Flynn 49'; Hanson 70'	Report	McCombe 27'; R.Taylor 75'	Stadium: Valley Parade; Attendance: 5,096; Referee: Graham Salisbury
	Penalties
	Flynn (penalty scored); O'Brien (penalty missed); Brandon (penalty missed); Hanson (penalty scored); O'Brien (penalty scored); Rehman (penalty scored); Williams (penalty scored)		Richards (penalty missed); Dodds (penalty scored); K. Taylor (penalty missed); Haldane (penalty scored); Fraser (penalty scored); R. Taylor (penalty scored); Yates (penalty missed)

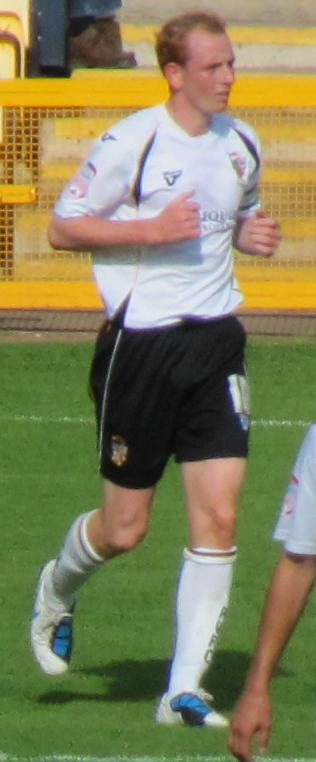
Captain Tommy Fraser.

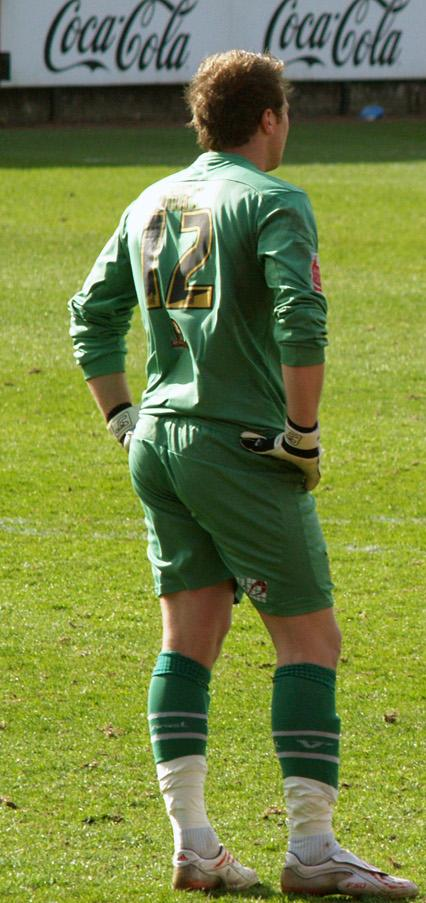
Young keeper Chris Martin established himself as the club's #1.

== Squad statistics ==
=== Appearances and goals ===
Key to positions: GK – Goalkeeper; DF – Defender; MF – Midfielder; FW – Forward

No.	Pos	Nat	Player	Total		League Two		FA Cup		League Cup		Football League Trophy	
No.	Pos	Nat	Player	Apps	Goals	Apps	Goals	Apps	Goals	Apps	Goals	Apps	Goals
1	GK	(England) ENG	Joe Anyon	7	0	7	0	0	0	0	0	0	0
3	MF	(England) ENG	Rob Taylor	44	10	38	8	2	0	3	1	1	1
4	MF	(Montserrat) MSR	Anthony Griffith	48	0	40	0	3	0	3	0	2	0
5	DF	(England) ENG	John McCombe	48	4	40	3	3	0	3	0	2	1
6	DF	(England) ENG	Luke Prosser	3	1	2	1	1	0	0	0	0	0
7	MF	(England) ENG	Doug Loft	37	3	32	3	2	0	3	0	0	0
8	MF	(Northern Ireland) NIR	David Howland	7	0	5	0	1	0	0	0	1	0
9	FW	(England) ENG	Marc Richards	54	22	46	19	3	0	3	2	2	1
10	MF	(England) ENG	Tommy Fraser	44	2	38	2	1	0	3	0	2	0
11	DF	(England) ENG	Adam Yates	37	1	32	0	2	1	2	0	1	0
12	GK	(England) ENG	Chris Martin	47	0	39	0	3	0	3	0	2	0
14	MF	(England) ENG	Louis Dodds	49	8	44	6	2	1	1	0	2	1
15	DF	(England) ENG	Lee Collins	53	1	45	1	3	0	3	0	2	0
16	DF	(Wales) WAL	Gareth Owen	46	1	40	1	1	0	3	0	2	0
17	MF	(England) ENG	Sean Rigg	26	3	26	3	0	0	0	0	0	0
18	FW	(England) ENG	Danny Glover	4	0	3	0	1	0	0	0	0	0
19	MF	(England) ENG	Simon Richman	6	0	5	0	0	0	1	0	0	0
20	MF	(England) ENG	Ross Davidson	0	0	0	0	0	0	0	0	0	0
21	FW	(Northern Ireland) NIR	James Lawrie	4	0	3	0	0	0	0	0	1	0
22	DF	(England) ENG	Danny Edwards	0	0	0	0	0	0	0	0	0	0
23	DF	(England) ENG	Lee Molyneux	0	0	0	0	0	0	0	0	0	0
24	GK	(England) ENG	Daniel Lloyd-Weston	0	0	0	0	0	0	0	0	0	0
25	FW	(Wales) WAL	Craig Davies	24	7	24	7	0	0	0	0	0	0
26	MF	(England) ENG	Kris Taylor	49	4	41	3	3	0	3	1	2	0
28	FW	(England) ENG	Geoff Horsfield	12	0	9	0	1	0	2	0	0	0
29	MF	(Egypt) EGY	Sam Morsy	1	0	1	0	0	0	0	0	0	0
32	MF	(Wales) WAL	Lewis Haldane	43	4	37	3	3	0	1	0	2	1
33	FW	(England) ENG	Anthony Malbon	0	0	0	0	0	0	0	0	0	0
34	DF	(British Virgin Islands) VGB	Matthew Bell	0	0	0	0	0	0	0	0	0	0
Players who featured but departed the club during the season:
2	DF	(England) ENG	Sam Stockley	12	0	9	0	0	0	2	0	1	0
17	FW	(England) ENG	Steve Thompson	0	0	0	0	0	0	0	0	0	0
23	MF	(England) ENG	Luke Chapman	0	0	0	0	0	0	0	0	0	0
25	MF	(Faroe Islands) FRO	Claus Bech Jørgensen	5	0	4	0	0	0	1	0	0	0
25	FW	(England) ENG	Jamie Guy	6	0	3	0	1	0	0	0	2	0
27	MF	(Republic of Ireland) IRL	Damien McCrory	5	0	5	0	0	0	0	0	0	0
33	FW	(England) ENG	Jason Jarrett	13	0	9	0	3	0	0	0	1	0

=== Top scorers ===
Place	Position	Nation	Number	Name	EFL League Two	FA Cup	EFL Cup	EFL Trophy	Total
1	FW	England	9	Marc Richards	19	0	2	1	22
2	MF	England	3	Rob Taylor	8	0	1	1	10
3	MF	England	14	Louis Dodds	6	1	0	1	8
4	FW	Wales	25	Craig Davies	7	0	0	0	7
5	MF	England	26	Kris Taylor	3	0	1	0	4
–	MF	Wales	32	Lewis Haldane	3	0	0	1	4
–	DF	England	5	John McCombe	3	0	0	1	4
8	MF	England	17	Sean Rigg	3	0	0	0	3
–	MF	England	7	Doug Loft	3	0	0	0	3
10	MF	England	10	Tommy Fraser	2	0	0	0	2
11	DF	England	15	Lee Collins	1	0	0	0	1
–	DF	Wales	16	Gareth Owen	1	0	0	0	1
–	DF	England	6	Luke Prosser	1	0	0	0	1
–	DF	England	11	Adam Yates	0	1	0	0	1
–	–	–	–	Own goals	1	0	0	0	1
				TOTALS	61	2	4	5	72

=== Disciplinary record ===
Number	Nation	Position	Name	League One		FA Cup		EFL Cup		EFL Trophy		Total	
Number	Nation	Position	Name	Yellow card	Red card	Yellow card	Red card	Yellow card	Red card	Yellow card	Red card	Yellow card	Red card
4	Montserrat	MF	Anthony Griffith	10	0	1	0	2	0	0	0	13	0
10	England	MF	Tommy Fraser	8	1	0	0	2	0	0	0	10	1
16	England	DF	Gareth Owen	5	0	0	0	1	0	0	0	6	0
3	England	MF	Rob Taylor	5	1	0	0	0	0	0	0	5	1
14	England	MF	Louis Dodds	5	0	0	0	0	0	0	0	5	0
9	England	FW	Marc Richards	5	0	0	0	0	0	0	0	5	0
2	England	DF	Sam Stockley	3	0	0	0	2	0	0	0	5	0
15	England	DF	Lee Collins	3	0	1	0	0	0	0	0	4	0
26	England	MF	Kris Taylor	3	0	1	0	0	0	0	0	4	0
32	Wales	MF	Lewis Haldane	3	1	0	0	1	0	0	0	4	1
5	England	DF	John McCombe	3	1	0	0	0	0	0	0	3	1
33	England	FW	Jason Jarrett	3	0	0	0	0	0	0	0	3	0
25	Wales	FW	Craig Davies	2	0	0	0	0	0	0	0	2	0
7	England	MF	Doug Loft	2	0	0	0	0	0	0	0	2	0
8	Northern Ireland	MF	David Howland	1	0	0	0	0	0	0	0	1	0
12	England	GK	Chris Martin	1	0	0	0	0	0	0	0	1	0
27	Ireland	MF	Damien McCrory	1	0	0	0	0	0	0	0	1	0
17	England	MF	Sean Rigg	1	0	0	0	0	0	0	0	1	0
11	England	DF	Adam Yates	1	0	0	0	0	0	0	0	1	0
			TOTALS	65	4	3	0	8	0	0	0	76	4

Sourced from Soccerway.

== Awards ==
End of Season Awards	Winner
Player of the Year	Anthony Griffith
Away Travel Player of the Year	Anthony Griffith
Players' Player of the Year	Lee Collins
Chairman Player of the Year	Lee Collins
Young Player of the Year	Chris Martin
Youth Player of the Year	Sam Morsy
Mr Shirt Off Your Back	Louis Dodds
Clubman of the Year	Brian Lewis
Assist of the Season	Lee Collins (vs Hereford United, 30 January 2010)
Goal of the Season	Rob Taylor (vs Hereford United, 29 August 2009)

== Transfers ==
=== Transfers in ===
Date from	Position	Nationality	Name	From	Fee	Ref.
May 2009	MF	ENG	Doug Loft	Brighton & Hove Albion	Free transfer	
June 2009	MF	ENG	Tommy Fraser	Brighton & Hove Albion	Free transfer	
June 2009	DF	ENG	Adam Yates	Morecambe	Free transfer	
July 2009	FW	ENG	Geoff Horsfield	Lincoln City	Free transfer	
July 2009	DF	ENG	Kris Taylor	Hereford United	Free transfer	
August 2009	MF	FAR	Claus Bech Jørgensen	Blackpool	Non-contract	
September 2009	MF	ENG	Jason Jarrett	Brighton & Hove Albion	Free transfer	
January 2010	FW	WAL	Lewis Haldane	Bristol Rovers	Free transfer	
January 2010	MF	ENG	Sean Rigg	Bristol Rovers	Free transfer	

=== Transfers out ===
Date from	Position	Nationality	Name	To	Fee	Ref.
September 2009	MF	FAR	Claus Bech Jørgensen	Fleetwood Town	Rejected contract	
October 2009	MF	ENG	Luke Chapman	Hednesford Town	Mutual consent	
October 2009	FW	ENG	Steve Thompson	AFC Telford United	Mutual consent	
November 2009	DF	ENG	Sam Stockley	(Hungary) Ferencvárosi TC	Retired	
December 2009	MF	ENG	Jason Jarrett	Oldham Athletic	Released	
March 2010	DF	ENG	Luke Prosser	Southend United	Released	
April 2010	MF	NIR	David Howland	(Northern Ireland) Glentoran	Released	
April 2010	FW	NIR	James Lawrie	AFC Telford United	Released	
April 2010	MF	ENG	Simon Richman	Worcester City	Released	
May 2010	GK	ENG	Joe Anyon	Lincoln City	Released	
May 2010	MF	ENG	Ross Davidson	Stafford Rangers	Released	
May 2010	FW	ENG	Danny Glover	Worcester City	Released	

=== Loans in ===
Date from	Position	Nationality	Name	From	Date to	Ref.
31 July 2009	FW	ENG	Sean Rigg	Colchester United	21 November 2009	
24 August 2009	FW	WAL	Lewis Haldane	Bristol Rovers	January 2010	
1 September 2009	DF	IRL	Damien McCrory	Plymouth Argyle	1 November 2009	
23 November 2009	MF	ENG	Sean Rigg	Bristol Rovers	January 2010	
15 January 2010	FW	WAL	Craig Davies	Brighton & Hove Albion	End of season	
25 March 2010	DF	ENG	Lee Molyneux	Southampton	End of season	

=== Loans out ===
Date from	Position	Nationality	Name	To	Date to	Ref.
13 August 2009	DF	ENG	Luke Prosser	Salisbury City	1 October 2009	
14 August 2009	FW	ENG	Danny Glover	Salisbury City	14 September 2009	
August 2009	MF	ENG	Ross Davidson	Stafford Rangers	September 2009	
3 September 2009	FW	ENG	Steve Thompson	Stafford Rangers	October 2009	
26 November 2009	FW	ENG	Danny Glover	Rochdale	2010	
December 2009	MF	ENG	Ross Davidson	Nantwich Town	February 2010	
February 2010	FW	ENG	Anthony Malbon	Leek Town	February 2010	
March 2010	MF	ENG	Ross Davidson	Stafford Rangers	End of season	
March 2010	FW	ENG	Danny Glover	Stafford Rangers	End of season	
25 March 2010	DF	ENG	Luke Prosser	Kidderminster Harriers	End of season	
