= Rob Taylor (footballer, born 1985) =

English footballer

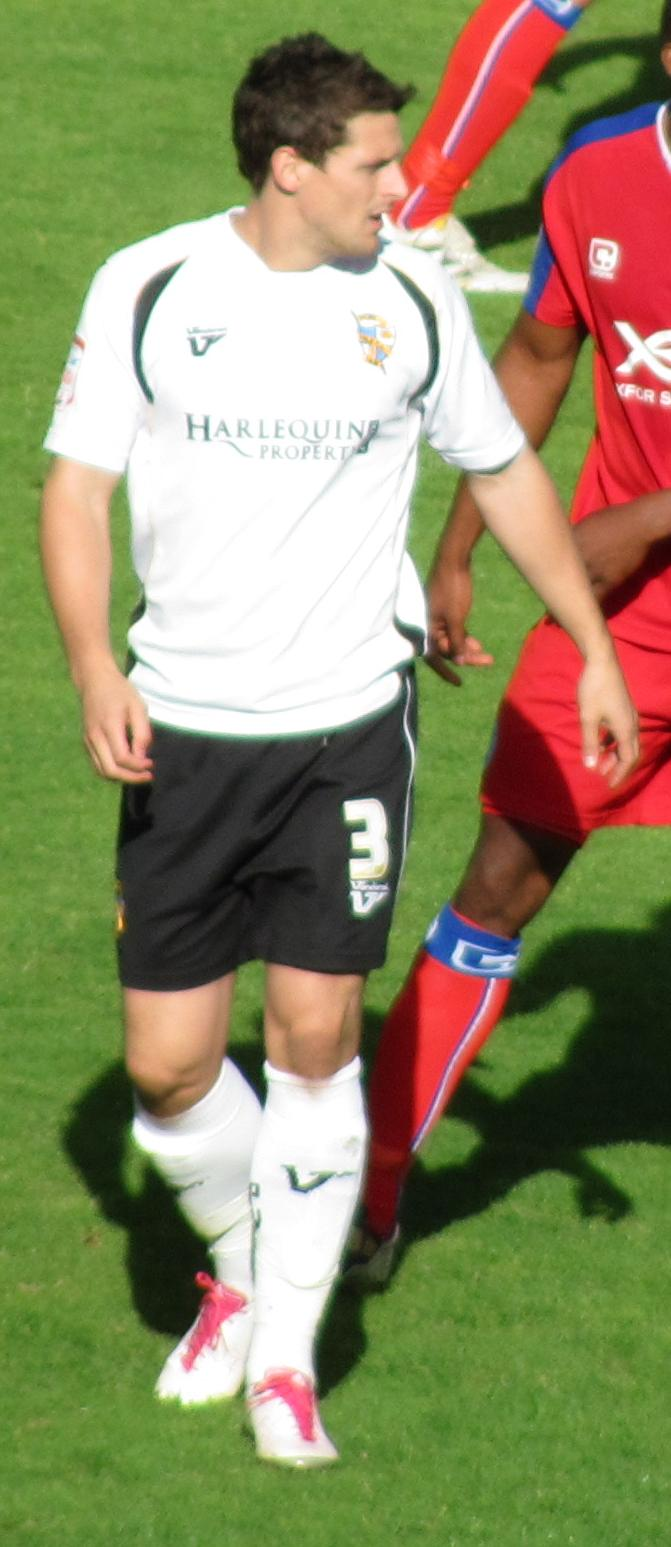
- Taylor in Port Vale colours (September 2010)

Personal information
- Full name: Robert James Taylor
- Date of birth: 16 January 1985 (age 41)
- Place of birth: Shrewsbury, England
- Height: 1.83 m (6 ft 0 in)
- Positions: Wing-back; midfielder; forward

Senior career*
| Years | Team | Apps | (Gls) |
| 2004 | Redditch United | | |
| 2004–2005 | Solihull Borough | | |
| 2005–2006 | Evesham United | | |
| 2006–2008 | Redditch United | | |
| 2008 | Nuneaton Borough | 8 | (2) |
| 2008–2014 | Port Vale | 159 | (15) |
| 2014–2015 | Mansfield Town | 16 | (0) |
| 2015 | Tranmere Rovers | 15 | (0) |
| 2015 | Kidderminster Harriers | 0 | (0) |
| Total | | 198 | (17) |
- * Club domestic league appearances and goals

Robert James Taylor (born 16 January 1985) is an English former footballer who played on the left flank and was known for his pace and dribbling ability.

A former non-League player with Solihull Borough, Redditch United, Evesham United, and Nuneaton Borough, his career in the English Football League began later than most, as he chose to put his education before his football. He signed with Port Vale in August 2008, and after establishing himself in the first team in 2008–09, he played more than forty games in the 2009–10 and 2010–11 campaigns. He helped the club to secure promotion out of League Two in 2012–13. He left Port Vale after six years and signed with Mansfield Town in August 2014. He moved on to Tranmere Rovers in January 2015 and then Kidderminster Harriers eight months later.

== Career ==
=== Early career ===
Taylor started his career at Redditch United, joining as a 19-year-old in May 2004. He went on to play in the Southern League with Solihull Borough in 2004–05 and Evesham United in 2005–06. He was relegated in both seasons. He then played in the Conference North for Redditch United in 2006–07 and Nuneaton Borough in 2007–08, where he was a consistently good performer in the division. He signed with Nuneaton on non-contract terms in February 2008. He made his debut as a substitute in a 1–0 win over Alfreton Town at Liberty Way on 1 March. He went on to make eight appearances for "Boro", scoring goals against Kettering Town and Hucknall Town. Manager Kevin Wilkin said that "Rob is competent and a good signing". Taylor went on to become a full-time professional but said "if it doesn't work out then I'd be happy to stay on with Nuneaton next season".

=== Port Vale ===
Despite several trials at English Football League clubs, he chose to put his education first and complete a degree at the University of Worcester. After a successful trial with Port Vale, where he scored in a reserve team outing, manager Lee Sinnott signed him up on a two-year deal in readiness for the 2008–09 season. He scored on his Vale debut in a 3–1 victory against Luton Town. When Sinnott's replacement Dean Glover took charge of the club, Taylor found himself out of contention and when Glover himself was removed Taylor stated his ambitions to earn himself a first-team place under fresh management.

During the start of the 2009–10 season, under new manager Micky Adams, Taylor found himself in the first-team and a fan favourite. He played in the League Cup "Sheffield double" defeats of both Championship sides, also scoring past Wednesday. In the following league game against Hereford United he scored a superb goal, that would later win him the club's Goal of the Season award. In August he set himself a target of ten goals for the season. Under Adams, Taylor was utilized in an attacking role, rather than his original role as left-back/left midfielder.

"When he believes in himself, he'll be frightening. He still doesn't quite understand his role yet. He's got to learn when to pass it and when to be nice and positive."

— Manager Micky Adams speaking in September 2009.

He was transfer listed in late September, along with the entire Port Vale squad, after manager Micky Adams saw his team slip to a third consecutive defeat. On 28 December 2009 he scored his sixth of the season at Grimsby Town's Blundell Park, before getting his second bookable offence, earning him the first sending off of his professional career. To his surprise and delight, his good form earned him a contract extension in January 2010 that tied him to the "Vale" until the summer of 2012. Adams said that he gave Taylor the contract to avoid other clubs making attempts to tempt him away from Vale Park.

Taylor found himself in the treatment room after tearing his hamstring in only his second start of the 2010–11 campaign. After recovering earlier than expected he aimed to regain his first-team place. On 8 January he scored a brace past Championship side Burnley in Vale's 4–2 FA Cup defeat at Turf Moor. These would be two of only three goals that season. However, he ended the campaign with 41 appearances to his name.

He started the 2011–12 season on the bench. After he scored in his first start of the season, a Football League Trophy tie with Tranmere Rovers, he cemented his first-team place with a brace against Bradford City in the league. However, he picked up an Achilles injury in February that left him unfit to play. He finished the season with three goals in 34 appearances and agreed to sign a new two-year deal with the club in May 2012. He missed all of the 2012–13 pre-season training with a calf injury. Vale secured promotion with a third-place finish at the end of the season, with Taylor making 32 appearances. Taylor missed the whole of 2013–14 pre-season after damaging his Achilles tendon, and was out of training for close to five months. He marked his first appearance of the season on 23 November with a goal in a 2–1 victory over local rivals Crewe Alexandra at Gresty Road. He made a further three appearances before missing six weeks from mid-December onwards with a thigh injury. He was released by the club in the summer, ending a six-year stay at Vale Park.

=== Mansfield Town ===
Taylor signed with League Two club Mansfield Town in August 2014 after impressing manager Paul Cox on trial. He played 19 games in the first half of the 2014–15 campaign, but new boss Adam Murray said Taylor had begun looking for a new club to be closer to his pregnant wife.

=== Tranmere Rovers ===
Taylor signed for League Two side Tranmere Rovers in January 2015 after being signed for an undisclosed fee by manager Micky Adams, who had coached him at Port Vale. He made 15 appearances for Rovers as the club dropped out of the Football League at the end of the 2014–15 season, and was not offered a new contract by new manager Gary Brabin.

=== Kidderminster Harriers ===
In August 2015, Taylor joined Kidderminster Harriers of the National League on a non-contract basis after a successful trial during pre-season. An ankle injury prevented him from playing however, and he left Aggborough in December.

== Style of play ==
An attacking left-sided player, he was known for his pace and ability to beat defenders.

== Personal life ==
Taylor holds a degree in Sports science from the University of Worcester. He is a Manchester United supporter. In January 2018, he appeared on the BBC's Wanted Down Under, where he and wife Selina decided to emigrate to Australia.

== Career statistics ==
Appearances and goals by club, season and competition
| Club | Season | League | | | FA Cup | | League Cup | | Other | | Total | |
| Club | Season | Division | Apps | Goals | Apps | Goals | Apps | Goals | Apps | Goals | Apps | Goals |
|---|---|---|---|---|---|---|---|---|---|---|---|---|
| Nuneaton Borough | 2007–08 | Conference North | 8 | 2 | 0 | 0 | 0 | 0 | 0 | 0 | 8 | 2 |
| Port Vale | 2008–09 | League Two | 20 | 3 | 0 | 0 | 1 | 0 | 1 (Note: Appearance(s) in the EFL Trophy.) | 0 | 22 | 3 |
| Port Vale | 2009–10 | League Two | 38 | 8 | 2 | 0 | 3 | 1 | 1 | 1 | 44 | 10 |
| Port Vale | 2010–11 | League Two | 36 | 1 | 3 | 2 | 1 | 0 | 1 | 0 | 41 | 3 |
| Port Vale | 2011–12 | League Two | 31 | 2 | 2 | 0 | 0 | 0 | 1 | 1 | 34 | 3 |
| Port Vale | 2012–13 | League Two | 28 | 0 | 2 | 0 | 0 | 0 | 2 | 0 | 32 | 0 |
| Port Vale | 2013–14 | League One | 6 | 1 | 2 | 1 | 0 | 0 | 0 | 0 | 8 | 2 |
| Port Vale | Total | | 159 | 15 | 11 | 3 | 5 | 1 | 6 | 2 | 181 | 21 |
| Mansfield Town | 2014–15 | League Two | 16 | 0 | 3 | 0 | 1 | 0 | 1 | 0 | 21 | 0 |
| Tranmere Rovers | 2014–15 | League Two | 15 | 0 | — | | — | | — | | 15 | 0 |
| Kidderminster Harriers | 2015–16 | National League | 0 | 0 | 0 | 0 | — | | 0 | 0 | 0 | 0 |
| Career total | | | 198 | 17 | 14 | 3 | 6 | 1 | 7 | 2 | 225 | 23 |

== Honours ==
Port Vale

- Football League Two third-place promotion: 2012–13
