= Danny Glover (footballer) =

English footballer (born 1989)

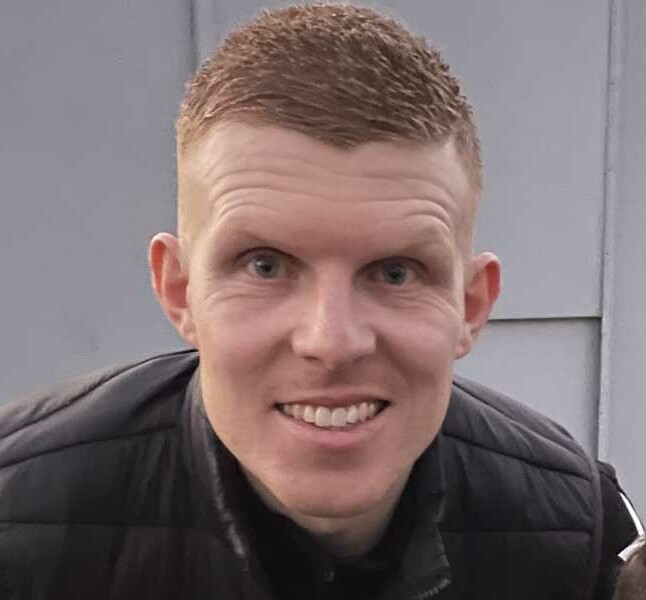
- Glover in 2022

Personal information
- Full name: Daniel Glover
- Date of birth: 24 October 1989 (age 37)
- Place of birth: Crewe, England
- Height: 5 ft 9 in (1.75 m)
- Position: Striker

Team information
- Current team: Eccleshall (player-manager)

Youth career
- 2000–2007: Port Vale

Senior career*
Years	Team	Apps	(Gls)
2007–2010	Port Vale	41	(4)
2009	→ Salisbury City (loan)	7	(0)
2009–2010	→ Rochdale (loan)	2	(0)
2010	→ Stafford Rangers (loan)		
2010–2011	Worcester City		
2011–2012	Nuneaton Town	37	(17)
2012–2014	Worcester City	50	(12)
2013	→ FC Halifax Town (loan)	10	(0)
2014	Bradford Park Avenue	8	(2)
2014–2015	Hednesford Town	28	(10)
2015	Stockport County	20	(4)
2015–2016	AFC Telford United	11	(1)
2016–2018	Hednesford Town		
2016	→ Alsager Town (loan)		
2018–2019	Nantwich Town	30	(10)
2019–2020	Hednesford Town	37	(18)
2020–2022	Rushall Olympic	33	(18)
2022	Hanley Town		
2022–2023	Hednesford Town	18	(4)
2023–2025	Chasetown	54	(15)
2025–	Eccleshall	26	(22)

Managerial career
- 2020: Hednesford Town (caretaker)
- 2022–2023: Hednesford Town (player-manager)
- 2026–: Eccleshall (player-manager)
- * Club domestic league appearances and goals as of 19:30, 26 April 2026 (UTC)

Daniel Glover (born 24 October 1989) is an English footballer and manager who plays as a striker; he is the player-manager at North West Counties League Division One South club Eccleshall.

Glover followed his father, Dean Glover, to rise through the ranks at Port Vale to sign as a professional in 2007. He was a semi-regular player in 2007–08 and 2008–09, also playing on loan for Salisbury City, Rochdale, and Stafford Rangers. Released in the summer of 2010, he then spent a season with Worcester City before joining Nuneaton Town. Having helped Nuneaton to win promotion out of the Conference North, he returned to Worcester in July 2012. He was loaned to FC Halifax Town in March 2013. He had two months at Bradford Park Avenue from January 2014 before joining Hednesford Town. He joined Stockport County in December 2014 and moved on to AFC Telford United in July 2015. He rejoined Hednesford Town in January 2016 and later played on loan at Alsager Town. He signed with Nantwich Town in June 2018 before returning for a third spell at Hednesford Town in May 2019, where he also spent a brief time as caretaker manager. He signed with Rushall Olympic in October 2020 and moved on to Hanley Town in June 2022. He returned to Hednesford Town as player-manager in December 2022 and signed for Chasetown as a player in November 2023. He joined Eccleshall in September 2025 and was appointed player-manager the following July.

== Career ==
=== Port Vale ===
The son of former Port Vale player Dean Glover, as his father was best friends with teammate Martin Foyle, Foyle allowed both the Glovers to play in his testimonial match in 2001, with the young Glover being just eleven years old. The match also included Foyle's young son Lee, and celebrity fans Robbie Williams and Jonathan Wilkes. A product of the Vale youth team, Glover signed professionally for Port Vale after impressing for the youth side and being voted 2007 Youth Player of the Year by the Port Vale management.

He has a centre-forward's first touch and receives the ball like one, too, with his back to his opponent... Glover passes well, particularly when under pressure from opponents and, when he made the odd mistake, it was nice to see him apologise... I would like him to be more aggressive in his runs when demanding the ball from team-mates in possession and concentrate better – he switched off occasionally.

— Steve Claridge gives an early evaluation of the player.

Glover made his first-team debut on 9 October 2007, coming on as a 71st-minute substitute for Marc Richards in a 2–2 draw at Morecambe in the Football League Trophy. He made his debut in League One on 4 December, coming on as a 65th-minute substitute for Mark McGregor in a 3–0 defeat to Leeds United at Elland Road. He scored his first goal in senior football on 26 April, in a 2–2 draw with Northampton Town. Having made 16 appearances, he was voted Young Player of the Year by the Port Vale management at the end of the 2007–08 relegation season.

After his father became manager on 6 October 2008, Glover received mixed receptions whilst coming onto the pitch. This was put down to his father's performance as manager rather than any reflection on the player himself. Numerous figures at the club lent their support to Glover, including captain Marc Richards. After scoring his first goal of the season and second of his career in a 2–1 victory over Rochdale on 28 December, Glover vowed that "the boo-boys will only make me stronger." However, for the goal celebration he removed his shirt to reveal a vest that read "Happy birthday, Dad", his father's 45th birthday being the next day. He was booked for the incident and was dismissed from the field five minutes later for a second bookable offence. With the club languishing in the bottom half of League Two and some fans still angry with both Glovers, Dean condemned fans who booed his son. Glover Sr. would lose his job the next month. He later admitted he had considered quitting the game at this point. Glover was disappointed with his performances in the 2008–09 season and insisted that being the manager's son handed him no favours:

"Whether my dad was at the club or not I knew, and the team knew, that I was only ever going to be in the team if I was playing well. I was never going to be picked just because my dad was there."

— Glover responds to accusations that he benefited from his father being club manager.

He stated his aim to win a new contract at the end of the 2009–10 season. However, he was transfer listed by new manager Micky Adams in August 2009, along with five other youngsters, having failed to impress in the pre-season. He swiftly joined Conference National side Salisbury City on a one-month loan deal, along with fellow "Valiant" Luke Prosser. He made his debut for the "Whites" as a substitute in a 1–0 defeat to Mansfield Town at the Raymond McEnhill Stadium, former Vale teammate Kyle Perry was the goalscorer. He played seven games, mostly as a substitute, before returning to Vale Park. By mid-November, his impressive performances in the reserves showed a new 'appetite for the game', and earned him a place on the first-team bench. Before the month was out he was loaned out Rochdale, also of League Two. He returned to the Vale in early January, having played just two games as a late substitute, totalling just 25 minutes on the field. His opportunities at Spotland were limited by an in-form strike force and match postponements due to poor weather. Rochdale did not extend the loan spell, reportedly due to financial difficulties. However, Glover said that the loan spell helped to boost his confidence. He still received abuse from some at Vale Park though, almost a year after his father's departure. In March 2010 he was informed that he would not be offered a new contract at the Vale at the end of the season, along with fellow youth graduates Luke Prosser and Ross Davidson. He and Davidson immediately joined local Conference North side Stafford Rangers on loan.

=== Non-League ===
In July 2010, Glover had a trial at Conference North club Worcester City. He impressed enough to win a contract from manager Carl Heeley. He enjoyed a highly productive 2010–11 campaign, scoring 20 goals in all competitions, including 14 in the league, also becoming the first player to score a hat-trick for the club in four years. Despite rumours of a move to Conference National side Tamworth, Glover insisted he was happy to stay with the "Blues". He eventually left Worcester in June 2011, having scored 20 goals for the club, and signed for league rivals Nuneaton Town. He scored 21 goals as "Boro" reached the play-off final in 2011–12, and secured promotion with a 1–0 victory over Gainsborough Trinity at The Northolme. He left Liberty Way in May 2012 and returned to former club Worcester City two months later. He joined league rivals FC Halifax Town on loan in March 2013, managed by Neil Aspin, citing Halifax's play-off chase as more beneficial to his development than staying with mid-table Worcester in the 2012–13 end-of-season run-in. He played ten games for the "Shaymen"; the club secured a play-off place and went on to win promotion, though Glover did not feature in the play-offs.

Glover switched to league rivals Bradford Park Avenue in January 2014, having become frustrated by a lack of first-team goals at Worcester. He was released from the Horsfall Stadium due to budget constraints, and signed with Hednesford Town in March 2014. The "Pitmen" finished the 2013–14 season in the play-off zone. He scored in the Conference North play-off semi-final against Altrincham at Keys Park, but Hednesford were beaten 3–1 on aggregate. He scored nine goals in 21 games in the first half of the 2014–15 campaign, including a brace against Harrogate Town and a hat-trick against Hyde. He switched to Conference North rivals Stockport County in December 2014. However, he only managed to score four goals in 20 appearances for the "Hatters" in the second half of the 2014–15 campaign.

Glover was transfer-listed at Edgeley Park by incoming manager Neil Young and was allowed to join AFC Telford United in July 2015. He scored just once in 11 National League North appearances for Bernard McNally's "Bucks". Telford sacked him in January 2016 after he was discovered to have played three games for the Butcher's Arms public house and was, therefore, in breach of his Telford contract. He then rejoined Hednesford Town in the National League North. He scored one goal in 16 appearances as Hednesford were relegated at the end of the 2015–16 campaign. He signed a new contract in May 2016. He played two games on loan at North West Counties League Division One side Alsager Town in September 2016, scoring a hat-trick on his debut. He continued his good form back at Keys Park and finished as the club's top-scorer with 13 goals in 25 starts and 10 substitute appearances as Hednesford finished 15th in the Northern Premier League Premier Division in the 2016–17 season. He scored his 50th goal for the club on 27 March 2018, in a 5–0 victory over Basford United in the quarter-finals of the Northern Premier League Challenge Cup. Henesford finished 17th in the 2017–18 season, and Glover was named as both Managers Player of the Season and Sportsman of the Season for his 29 goals in all competitions.

On 18 June 2018, he and teammate James Lawrie both signed with Nantwich Town, also of the Northern Premier League Premier Division. He lifted the Cheshire Senior Cup with the club after playing in the 5–2 final victory over Cammell Laird 1907. He also helped the "Dabbers" to reach the play-offs, where they were beaten by Warrington Town in the semi-finals. He rejoined Hednesford Town for a third time on 31 May 2019, joining the club as a player-coach. In February 2020 he was appointed joint caretaker manager, a role he held until late March. He scored 20 goals in 40 games before the 2019–20 season was formally abandoned on 26 March, with all results from the season being expunged, due to the COVID-19 pandemic in England.

On 30 October 2020, Glover signed with Rushall Olympic, also of the Southern League Premier Division Central, who were managed by former Hednesford boss Liam McDonald. However, the 2020–21 season was curtailed early due to the ongoing pandemic on 24 February 2021. The "Pics" qualified for the play-offs at the end of the 2021–22 season, but were beaten 3–0 by Coalville Town in the semi-finals. He scored 24 goals from 50 appearances in the 2021–22 season. Rushall qualified for the play-offs with a fourth-place finish but were beaten 3–0 by Coalville Town in the semi-finals.

On 30 June 2022, Northern Premier League Division One West side Hanley Town announced the signing of Glover. On 17 December 2022, Glover returned to Hednesford Town as player-manager. Hednesford were relegated at the end of the 2022–23 season amid a financial crisis, with Glover contributing four goals from 18 playing appearances.

On 1 November 2023, he signed with Chasetown, with manager Mark Swann saying that he "will be a massive addition for the football club". He scored against Stalybridge Celtic on his debut. He scored 12 goals in 27 games in the 2023–24 campaign, including a goal in the Walsall Senior Cup final defeat to Rushall Olympic. He scored eight goals in 38 games in the 2024–25 season and missed a penalty in the play-off semi-final defeat to Congleton Town. He featured as a substitute in the Staffordshire Senior Cup final victory over Rushall Olympic.

On 5 September 2025, Glover signed with North West Counties League Division One South club Eccleshall. He scored in the 2026 Staffordshire Senior Cup final defeat to Rushall Olympic. He scored a penalty in the play-off final against Stockport Georgians, which ended in defeat. He was appointed as the club's manager on 15 July 2026.

== Career statistics ==
As of match played 2 May 2026

Appearances and goals by club, season and competition
Club	Season	League			FA Cup		League Cup		Other		Total	
Club	Season	Division	Apps	Goals	Apps	Goals	Apps	Goals	Apps	Goals	Apps	Goals
Port Vale	2006–07	League One	0	0	0	0	0	0	0	0	0	0
Port Vale	2007–08	League One	15	1	0	0	0	0	1 (Note: Appearance(s) in the Football League Trophy.)	0	16	1
Port Vale	2008–09	League Two	23	3	2	0	0	0	1	0	26	3
Port Vale	2009–10	League Two	3	0	1	0	0	0	0	0	4	0
Port Vale	Total		41	4	3	0	0	0	2	0	46	4
Salisbury City (loan)	2009–10	Conference National	7	0	0	0	—		0	0	7	0
Rochdale (loan)	2009–10	League Two	2	0	—		—		—		2	0
Nuneaton Town	2011–12	Conference North	37	17	3	1	—		7 (Note: 2 appearances in the FA Trophy, 2 appearances and 2 goals in the Birmingham Senior Cup and 3 appearances and 1 goal in the play-offs.)	3	47	21
Worcester City	2012–13	Conference North	29	10	1	0	—		0	0	30	10
Worcester City	2013–14	Conference North	21	2	2	0	—		3 (Note: Appearance(s) in the FA Trophy.)	0	26	2
Worcester City	Total		50	12	3	0	0	0	3	0	56	12
FC Halifax Town (loan)	2012–13	Conference North	10	0	0	0	0	0	0	0	10	0
Bradford Park Avenue	2013–14	Conference North	8	2	0	0	—		0	0	8	2
Hednesford Town	2013–14	Conference North	7	1	0	0	—		2 (Note: Appearance(s) in the play-offs.)	1	9	2
Hednesford Town	2014–15	Conference North	21	9	0	0	—		0	0	21	9
Hednesford Town	Total		28	10	0	0	0	0	2	1	30	11
Stockport County	2014–15	Conference North	20	4	0	0	—		0	0	20	4
AFC Telford United	2015–16	National League North	11	1	0	0	—		0	0	11	1
Hednesford Town	2015–16	National League North	16	1	0	0	—		0	0	16	1
Nantwich Town	2018–19	Northern Premier League; Premier Division	30	10	0	0	0	0	9	1	39	11
Hednesford Town	2019–20	Southern League; Premier Division Central	31	17	3	1	1	0	5	2	40	20
Hednesford Town	2020–21	Southern League; Premier Division Central	6	1	2	2	0	0	0	0	8	3
Hednesford Town	Total		37	18	5	3	1	0	5	2	48	23
Rushall Olympic	2020–21	Southern League; Premier Division Central	0	0	0	0	0	0	2	0	2	0
Rushall Olympic	2021–22	Southern League; Premier Division Central	33	18	3	2	4	1	8 (Note: 2 appearances and 2 goals in the FA Trophy, 4 appearances and 1 goal in the Walsall Senior Cup, 1 appearance in the Staffordshire Senior Cup and 1 appearance in the play-offs.)	3	48	24
Rushall Olympic	Total		33	18	3	2	4	1	10	3	50	24
Hednesford Town	2022–23	Southern League; Premier Division Central	18	4	0	0	0	0	0	0	18	4
Hednesford Town	2023–24	Northern Premier League; Division One West	0	0	0	0	0	0	0	0	0	0
Hednesford Town	Total		18	4	0	0	0	0	0	0	18	4
Chasetown	2023–24	Northern Premier League; Division One West	23	8	0	0	0	0	4 (Note: Appearance(s) in the Walsall Senior Cup.)	4	27	12
Chasetown	2024–25	Northern Premier League; Division One West	31	7	0	0	0	0	7 (Note: 4 appearances in the FA Trophy, 1 appearance and 1 goal in the Walsall Senior Cup, 1 appearance in the Staffordshire Senior Cup and 1 appearance in the play-offs.)	1	38	8
Chasetown	Total		54	15	0	0	0	0	11	5	65	20
Eccleshall	2025–26	North West Counties League; Division One South	26	22	0	0	0	0	8 (Note: 4 appearances and 4 goals in the Staffordshire Senior Cup, 1 appearance and 1 goal in the Edward Case Cup, 1 appearance in the FA Vase, 2 appearances and 1 goal in the play-offs.)	6	34	28
Career total (Note: Complete statistics for Stafford Rangers, Worcester City, Hednesford Town, Alsager Town and Hanley Town not recorded.)			428	138	17	6	5	1	57	21	507	166

== Honours ==
Nuneaton Town

- Conference North play-offs: 2012

Nantwich Town

- Cheshire Senior Cup: 2019

Chasetown

- Walsall Senior Cup runner-up: 2024
- Staffordshire Senior Cup: 2025

Eccleshall

- Staffordshire Senior Cup runner-up: 2026
