= Ross Davidson (footballer, born 1989) =

English footballer (born 1989)

Personal information
- Full name: Ross Davidson
- Date of birth: 6 September 1989 (age 37)
- Place of birth: Burton upon Trent, England
- Height: 6 ft 1 in (1.86 m)
- Position: Midfielder

Youth career
- Port Vale

Senior career*
Years	Team	Apps	(Gls)
2008–2010	Port Vale	26	(0)
2009	→ Stafford Rangers (loan)		
2009–2010	→ Nantwich Town (loan)		
2010	→ Stafford Rangers (loan)		
2010	Stafford Rangers		
2011	Hednesford Town		
2011–2012	Kidsgrove Athletic		
2012	Leek Town	10	(0)
2012–2013	New Mills		
2013	Nantwich Town		
2013–2014	Witton Albion		
2014–2018	Kidsgrove Athletic		
2018–2022	Trafford	73	(5)
2022–2023	Leek Town	57	(0)
2023–2024	Clitheroe	5	(0)
- * Club domestic league appearances and goals

Ross Davidson (born 6 September 1989) is an English footballer who played as a midfielder.

A youth player at Port Vale, he was a professional at the club from 2008 to 2010. After two loan spells at Stafford Rangers and one at Nantwich Town, he signed permanently with Stafford in 2010. He soon switched clubs to Hednesford Town before joining Kidsgrove Athletic in 2011. He switched to Leek Town in July 2012 and joined New Mills in December 2012. He moved on to Nantwich Town the following year before playing for Witton Albion. He returned to Kidsgrove Athletic in November 2014. He spent four years with Kidsgrove before spending 2018 to 2022 with Trafford. He rejoined Leek Town in January 2022 and moved on to Clitheroe the following year.

== Career ==
Davidson, a product of the Port Vale youth team, was handed his professional contract at the end of the 2007–08 season. By his second season, he was a first-team regular; he received his first sending off against Brentford for a 34th-minute slide challenge on Karleigh Osborne. He received a three-match ban but was supported by his teammates, parents, and a Vale supporting Priest, who visited him in the locker room to give Davidson support. Assistant manager Ian Brightwell believed the challenge did not warrant a sending off and the club appealed the ban, to no avail. Despite being a regular in the first half of the season, he played just four games of the 2009 end. He considered leaving the game, but in June 2009 signed a new 12-month deal with the club.

He joined Conference North side Stafford Rangers on loan in August 2009. At the same time he was also transfer listed by Vale manager Micky Adams, along with five other youngsters. With his prospects at Vale Park limited, Rangers were keen to extend the loan deal, after Davidson was impressive in his first six games for the club. However, he instead returned to Vale Park. In December that year he joined nearby Nantwich Town on loan, a team mid-table in the Northern Premier League Premier Division. In January the loan deal was extended by a further month. In March 2010 he was informed that he would not be offered a new contract by the "Valiants" at the end of the season, and immediately re-joined Stafford Rangers on loan until the expiry of their contracts.

Expected to join Rangers permanently in summer 2010, Davidson was hopeful of playing higher-level football, but did however, sign with Rangers. Before the end of the season he switched clubs to Hednesford Town of the Southern League Premier Division. Following defeat in the play-off final to Salisbury City and a second-place finish in the 2010–11 season, Hednesford were moved to the Northern Premier League Premier Division. In summer 2011, he joined Northern Premier League Division One South club Kidsgrove Athletic. The club finished in 13th place in 2011–12. He switched to Leek Town in July 2012, before leaving Harrison Park and moving on to New Mills in December 2012. He joined Nantwich Town of the Northern Premier League Premier Division for the 2013–14 season. He later moved on to Witton Albion, making his debut on 25 March 2014. He played nine games in the 2013–14 season and scored two goals from 16 in the 2014–15 campaign. He returned to Kidsgrove Athletic in November 2014. The "Grove" finished 20th in the Northern Premier League Division One South in 2014–15, 15th in 2015–16, and 12th in 2016–17. He scored two goals in the 2016–17 season. Athletic finished 18th in the 2017–18 season.

Davidson signed with Trafford in summer 2018. He scored two goals in twenty games during the 2018–19 season and featured 33 times in the 2019–20 season, which was abandoned due to the COVID-19 pandemic in the United Kingdom. He played nine games in the 2020–21 season, which was also abandoned. He rejoined Leek Town in January 2022, making his second debut for the club almost ten years after his first spell had ended. He featured 13 times in the second half of the 2021–22 season. He made 38 appearances in the 2022–23 season, including in the play-off semi-final defeat to Runcorn Linnets. He moved on to Clitheroe in November 2023.

== Personal life ==
Born in Burton upon Trent, Davidson attended Thomas Alleyne's High School. He grew up an Arsenal fan.

== Career statistics ==
As of match played 8 November 2023

Appearances and goals by club, season and competition
Club	Season	League			FA Cup		League Cup		Other		Total	
Club	Season	Division	Apps	Goals	Apps	Goals	Apps	Goals	Apps	Goals	Apps	Goals
Port Vale	2007–08	League One	3	0	0	0	0	0	0	0	3	0
Port Vale	2008–09	League Two	23	0	1	0	1	0	0	0	25	0
Port Vale	2009–10	League Two	0	0	0	0	0	0	0	0	0	0
Port Vale	Total		26	0	1	0	1	0	0	0	28	0
Hednesford Town	2010–11	Southern League; Premier Division									29	1
Leek Town	2013–14	Northern Premier League; Division One South	10	0	4	1	1	0	2 (Note: Appearance/s in the FA Trophy.)	0	17	1
Witton Albion	2013–14	Northern Premier League; Premier Division									9	0
Witton Albion	2014–15	Northern Premier League; Premier Division									16	2
Witton Albion	Total										25	2
Trafford	2018–19	Northern Premier League; Division One West	18	2	0	0	2	0	0	0	20	2
Trafford	2019–20	Northern Premier League; Division One West	26	1	3	0	2	0	2 (Note: 1 appearance in the FA Trophy and 1 appearance in the Manchester Senior Cup.)	0	33	1
Trafford	2020–21	Northern Premier League; Division One West	6	0	2	0	0	0	1	0	9	0
Trafford	2021–22	Northern Premier League; Division One West	23	2	2	0	0	0	0	0	25	2
Trafford	Total		73	5	7	0	4	0	3	0	87	5
Leek Town	2021–22	Northern Premier League; Division One West	16	0	0	0	0	0	2 (Note: Appearance/s in the Staffordshire Senior Cup.)	0	18	0
Leek Town	2022–23	Northern Premier League; Division One West	30	0	0	0	0	0	8 (Note: 3 appearances in the FA Trophy, 4 appearances in the Staffordshire Senior Cup and 1 appearance in the play-offs.)	0	38	0
Leek Town	2023–24	Northern Premier League; Division One West	11	0	4	0	0	0	1	0	16	0
Leek Town	Total		57	0	4	0	0	0	11	0	72	0
Clitheroe	2023–24	Northern Premier League; Division One West	5	0	0	0	0	0	0	0	5	0
