= 2010–11 Port Vale F.C. season =

Port Vale F.C.
2010–11 season
- Owner: Valiant 2001
- Chairman: Bill Bratt
- Manager: Micky Adams (until 30 December); Mark Grew & Geoff Horsfield (caretakers 30 December – 6 January); Jim Gannon (6 January – 21 March); Mark Grew (caretaker from 21 March)
- Stadium: Vale Park
- Football League Two: 11th (65 points)
- FA Cup: Third Round (eliminated by Burnley)
- League Cup: Second Round (eliminated by Fulham)
- Football League Trophy: Second Round (eliminated by Carlisle United)
- Player of the Year: John McCombe
- Top goalscorer: League: Marc Richards (16); All: Marc Richards (20)
- Highest home attendance: 8,607 vs. Crewe Alexandra, 30 October 2010
- Lowest home attendance: 2,442 vs. Rochdale, 31 August 2010
- Average home league attendance: 5,533
- Biggest win: 5–0 and 7–2
- Biggest defeat: 0–6 vs. Fulham, 25 August 2010
Home colours	Away colours

The 2010–11 season was Port Vale's 99th season of football in the English Football League, and third-successive season in League Two. Vale enjoyed a solid start to the campaign, looking like good prospects for promotion. However, Micky Adams left the club in December to take charge of Sheffield United, leaving the promotion push to be finished by a new man Jim Gannon. Gannon's traumatic reign ended after just two months; his exit was confirmed after players, staff, and fans turned against him. Vale exited the FA Cup in the third round and left both the League Cup and the Football League Trophy in the second round. In the background, numerous groups and individuals expressed their willingness to purchase the club. The board turned away these investors – to the anger of some fans, who formed a 'Black and Gold' campaign demanding that the club be sold.

The turbulence of Gannon's reign, typified by a bust-up on a pre-match journey that became known as 'busgate', and the boardroom battle between multi-millionaire Water World owner Mo Chaudry and Bill Bratt's Valiant 2001 led some to call the season a 'soap opera farce'. At the end of the campaign Micky Adams returned as manager, giving fans cause for optimism following a highly disappointing season.

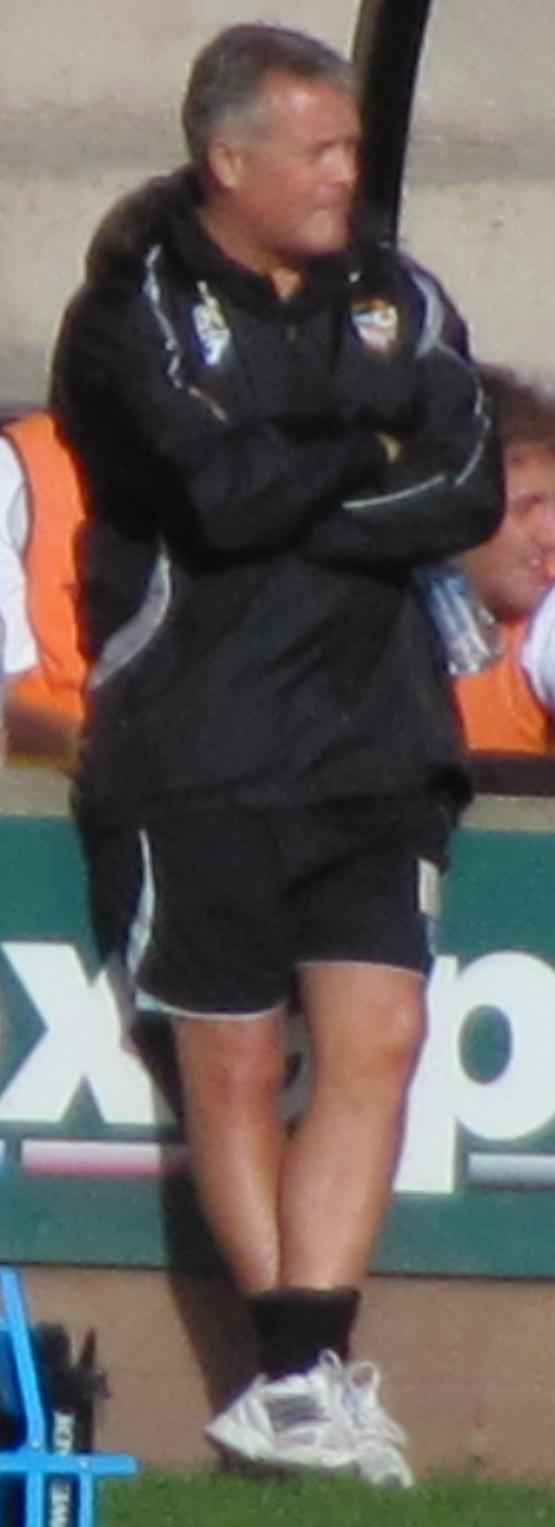
Micky Adams left the club in December.

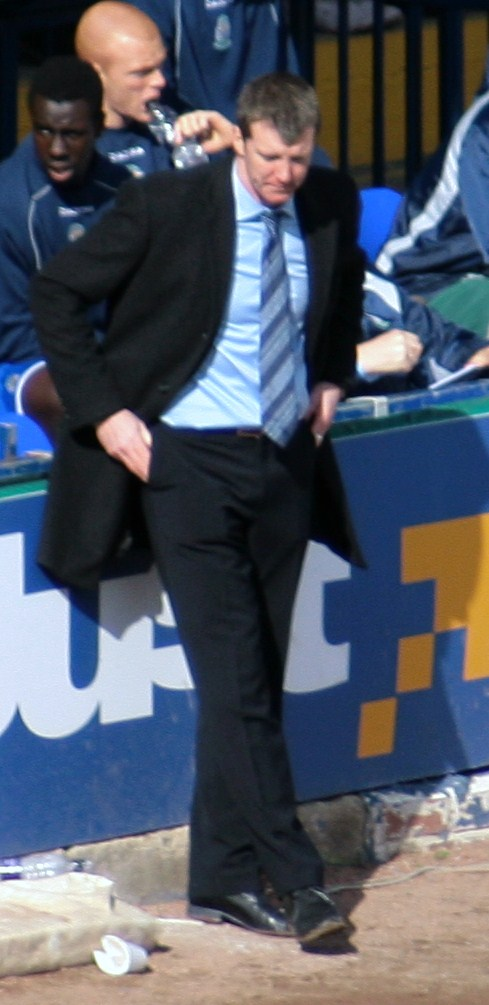
Jim Gannon was appointed as manager in January.

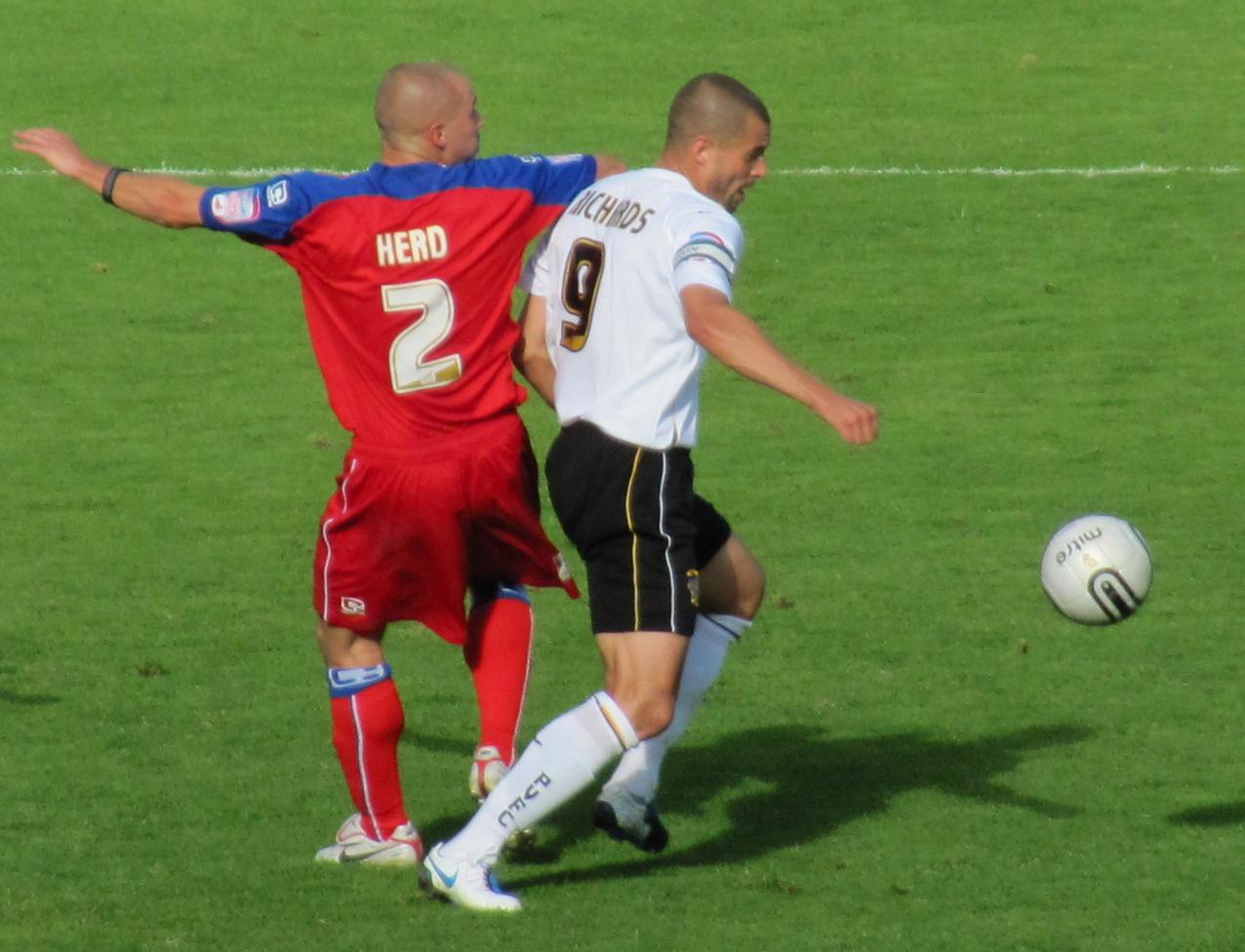
Top scorer Marc Richards.

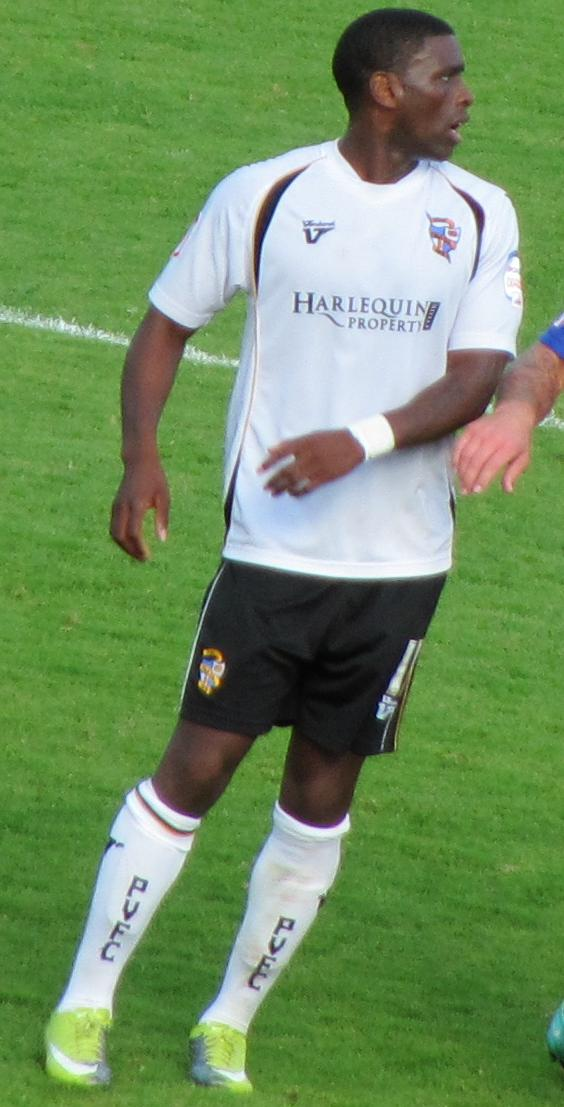
New signing Justin Richards.

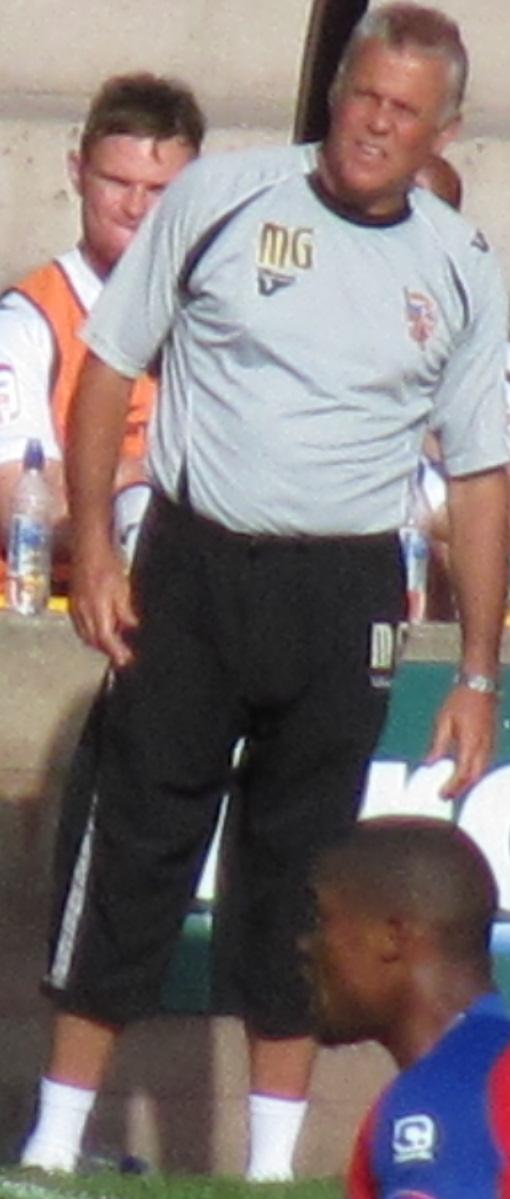
Caretaker manager Mark Grew took charge after Gannon's departure.

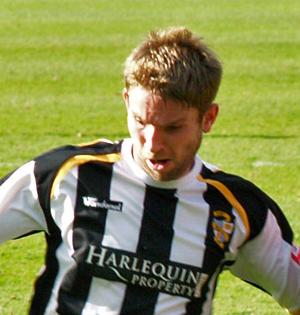
John McCombe was the club's Player of the Year.

== Overview ==
=== League Two ===
Before the start of the season there was speculation that manager Micky Adams would be approached by his former employers at Championship side Leicester City, having impressed in his position at Port Vale. Adams continued to make his mark at Vale though, releasing nine players, and signing Sean Rigg, Stuart Tomlinson, Justin Richards, Ritchie Sutton and Gary Roberts. Lewis Haldane was rushed into hospital after being bitten by an insect during a training session, forcing him to miss the first half of the season. Adams drafted in Reading winger Abdulai Bell-Baggie as a loan replacement for Haldane, and after an initial one-month period then replaced Bell-Baggie with Milton Keynes Dons loanee Jemal Johnson.

After his side won their opening four away league fixtures for the first time in their history, talks began to extend Adams' contract beyond 2012 as early as September 2010. Five wins in five for September saw Adam's gifted the League Two Manager of the Month award, his team also boasting five clean sheets. In October, Anthony Malbon was loaned out to Newcastle Town, and was later released so as to allow him to join Leek Town permanently. Taking Malbon's place on the bench was Jake Speight, who joined on a two-month loan from Bradford City. On 23 November, Vale recorded a 5–0 victory over Stockport County. Micky Adams was handed the Manager of the Month award for November, after his club advanced into the third round of the FA Cup and rose to the top of the League Two table on the back of five clean sheets in seven games. For his strong performances, John McCombe was also nominated for the League Two Player of the Month award. Departing for his boyhood club Sheffield United at the end of December 2010, Micky Adams left Vale in second position in League Two, though on a poor run of form.

Jim Gannon was confirmed as manager on 6 January, signing a contract that lasted until summer 2012. Saying that finishing outside of the top seven would be a failure, the Cheshire-based manager's first task after 'burying the hatchet' with Gareth Owen was to look for a new striker, as injuries struck down both Marc Richards and Doug Loft. Two weeks into his reign club captain Tommy Fraser left the club by mutual consent, and signed with Barnet. Marc Richards was handed the captaincy. Gannon brought in Romaine Sawyers and Kayleden Brown on loan from West Bromwich Albion, Jay O'Shea on loan from Birmingham City, Exodus Geohaghon on loan from Peterborough United, and striker Tom Pope on loan from Rotherham United. Losing four of his first five games in charge, Gannon was forced to respond to criticism over his team selections and substitutions, and announced plans to expand the club's non-playing staff. On 1 February the players met with the chairman and rumours spread that Gannon had 'lost the dressing room', as comparisons were made with the tenure of Brian Clough in The Damned United. Yet the next day an O'Shea volley gave Vale a 1–0 win over promotion rivals Rotherham United to give Gannon his first win in charge at the club.

However, tension remained, as proven at the end of the month when it was reported that Gannon left the team bus on a pre-match journey after rowing with assistant manager Geoff Horsfield (who had been appointed by Adams). Gannon had previously told the press his staff were 'underqualified', though insisted any changes would be 'implemented at a later stage' and that Horsfield was a 'great assistant'. This came on the same day that local paper The Sentinel ran an editorial that questioned his loan signings, his decision to drop Gary Roberts and branded his tactics and team selections as baffling. After Horsfield was told to stay away from the club for two weeks he was invited back to his assistant role as before, with no disciplinary action taken against either party. As the club fell to seventh in the tale, Gannon made another loan signing by bringing Dominic Blizzard in from Bristol Rovers. Results continued to go against the Vale though, as on 19 March they lost 3–0 at Accrington Stanley, and as a result dropped out of the play-off zone for the first time in the season. Ugly post-match scenes at the Crown Ground saw Geohaghon confront fans who singled him out for abuse, whilst Gannon was ushered quietly out of the back door. Roberts told the media "I don't think the manager likes me and, to be honest, I don't like him". Rumours circulated that Gannon would soon be on his way out. These rumours were proved accurate two days later, as Gannon's departure was confirmed by the club. Loan signing Blizzard also left. Mark Grew took over as caretaker manager, though following a 2 April defeat to leaders Chesterfield he was forced to admit that automatic promotion was now out of reach. Later in the month Grew released Kristian Cox, before a home defeat to bottom-of-the-table Stockport County on 23 April meant that winning their remaining three games no longer guaranteed them a play-off spot. Their penultimate game of the season was a 7–2 mauling of Morecambe, which saw Louis Dodds and Justin Richards score the first hat-tricks at Vale Park since Martin Foyle hit three in 1994. This was also the club's biggest home victory in more than fifty years. The final game of the season saw a celebratory pitch invasion at Underhill, as Barnet secured their Football League season with a 1–0 victory over Vale.

They finished in eleventh place with 65 points, one position and three points less than the previous campaign. Only Stevenage conceded fewer goals, though outside of the bottom two, only Bradford City and Hereford United scored fewer goals. They finished three points short of the play-offs following a point deduction to Torquay United and finished behind Crewe Alexandra on goal difference. Marc Richards was the top-scorer for the third successive season, netting twenty goals in all competitions. Justin Richards finished with 14 goals, and no other player hit double figures.

At the end of the season Doug Loft and Adam Yates signed new two-year deals. Gareth Owen had announced a move to rivals Crewe Alexandra, however, when Micky Adams signed a three-year contract to return as manager, Owen reversed his decision and signed a two-year deal as player-coach at Vale Park. Only full-back Kris Taylor and youth team graduate Matthew Bell were not offered new contracts by Adams. Taylor moved on to Darlington and Bell signed with Mansfield Town – both Conference clubs. Defender Sutton also made the switch to Mansfield. However, chief scout Ray Williams did not have his contract renewed, after 39 years of service to the club, after falling out with the board.

=== Finances & ownership issues ===
On the financial side, in the pre-season, investor Mike Newton announced that he was willing to invest £400,000 in the club and take the board chair. Chairman Bill Bratt claimed to be unhappy with Newton's policy of negotiating in public (who had by then upped his offer to £500,000), and so Bratt remained as chairman. Newton claimed that his "efforts to become chairman and to invest in the club have been hampered and made almost impossible" by Bratt and his board, and said that the reasons giving to reject his investment were "one long round of excuses". Bratt was forced to deny claims by Newton that the club were heading for administration under his leadership. In September 2010 Bratt gave up his role as chief executive, but remained as chairman, denying that this decision was influenced by the recent Newton takeover bid. By this time the club's debts were estimated at £2m, a level described by Bratt as "manageable". The nine-man board's share total was valued at £359,400.

In December 2010 local businessman and Water World owner Mo Chaudry went public with his investment proposal for the club, however, Bratt said it was the first he had heard of the proposal, despite Chandry's legal advisor's claims they had spoken and that "it was made clear to me the club wasn't interested in selling to Mo Chaudry." The board swiftly and unanimously rejected the £1.3 million proposal. Following another anti-board protest from Vale supporters and the resignation of director Mike Thompstone, Bratt and his team decided to re-examine the Chaudry bid. In January 2011, another group of prospective investors, this time a group of Texas businessmen, announced they had pulled out of talks with Bratt's board. The group said: "the deal is completely dead because the directors don't want to sell the club... we believe they [the Vale] are run by the wrong people... [and] we didn't get anything apart from a cup of tea before watching a game." Fans began a protest movement called "Black and Gold Until it's Sold" – inspired by Manchester United's anti-Glazer scarf protest – in which fans wore black and gold scarves to symbolise their opposition to Bratt and the board.

By February, Chaudry had agreed to sign a confidentiality agreement, and face-to-face negotiations began. Chaudry was keen to accelerate the negotiations, accusing Bratt of stalling. Chaudry had the stadium revalued at £3.4m, some £2.3m less than stated in the board's accounts – Staffordshire University academic Ian Jackson commented that these were a part of the "skirmishes of negotiation". Despite this Chaudry's 12 March takeover deadline passed without comment from the Vale board, though another director, Paul Humphreys, resigned his position. Chaudry then teamed up with another local businessmen, Mark Sims, to purchase the maximum allowed 24.9% of shares each (to give them a combined total of 49.8% control). In addition to the 'Black and Gold' campaign, two further fan-based organisations, 'Starve Em Out' and 'North London Valiants', attempted to oust Bratt and his directors out of power at the club. Simms and Chaudry withdrew their joint bid after the Vale directors refused to discuss the proposal, calling the duo's proposal "not at all valid". Further resignations took the Vale board down to just five members.

Facing an EGM, Chaudry's cause was boosted when Broxap CEO Robert Lee announced that he would sell his £50,000 worth of shares to Chaudry, making the board's removal at the EGM more likely (however, Broxap later reversed their decision on the day of the EGM). However, just ten days before the EGM Bratt announced a ten-year £1.6 million sponsorship deal with Ameriturf Global Sports. A further twist came five days later, when Robbie Williams handed his 24.9% worth of EGM proxy votes over to Port Vale Supporters' Club. Many believed this would ensure the end of Bratt's reign, despite his warning that fans should "look at other clubs who have gone down this line and they have no longer got their ground and are paying vast sums in rent". The result of the EGM was a vote of no confidence in the board; directors Peter Jackson and Stan Meigh were voted out, however, the controversial '24.9% rule' survived – to Chaudry's disappointment. Also remaining were chairman Bill Bratt and directors Glenn Oliver and Mike Lloyd, three of the original nine that started the season. Each facing an individual vote received 51.07%, 50.64%, and 50.21% of the vote, respectively. The three survived as Broxap sold their shares to an unnamed director at the last minute, not to Chaudry as they had originally promised. Speaking of the change of heart from Broxap, Chaudry stated that "the board have engaged in dirty tricks from day one and there have been more at the 11th hour." Many fans expressed disappointment at the result, though Chaudry again announced he "will not walk away".

The future remained unclear, with both Bratt and Chaudry taking gains and losses from the EGM. The club's constitution required four directors for the board to be considered valid, and so the board welcomed new director Mark Sims, a Chaudry supporter, who was voted on to the board at the EGM after he was sponsored by Robbie Williams. Sims stated his intention of convincing the three original directors of the merits of Chaudry's bid. The board also invited supporters group North London Valiants to nominate a director. The EGM disrupted manager Micky Adams' transfer plans as the club's constitution stipulated that at least four directors must be in place for financial transactions such as issuing new contracts to take place. In a shock move Adams announced that he intended to take up a directorship at the club, purchasing £50,000 worth of shares with his own money (though former director Stan Meigh later said that it was he who provided the money) he declared that "this is a purely footballing decision... I understand that the last few months have been difficult for everyone and am asking all of our supporters to put their differences aside, to support my candidacy for the Board and then to get behind the team in the coming season." Supporters' groups opposed to Bill Bratt's chairmanship did not welcome the news. At the end of the season, Stoke-on-Trent city council confirmed that the two-year repayment holiday for a £2.25 million loan taken out in 2005 had come to an end.

=== Cup competitions ===
In the FA Cup, Vale nearly slipped up at Princes Park to Conference South Dartford, and were saved only by an 84th minute John McCombe header. Vale made no mistake in the replay, dispatching the "Darts" with a 4–0 win. They booked themselves a third round date at Turf Moor with Championship club Burnley with a 1–0 home win over Accrington Stanley. The Burnley game was Gannon's first game in charge, and resulted in a 4–2 defeat.

In the League Cup, Vale managed to defeat a Championship side by slaying high-flying Queens Park Rangers 3–1 at Loftus Road, new signing Richards scoring twice. Premier League opposition proved to be too much of a challenge however, as a strong Fulham side destroyed the Vale 6–0 at Craven Cottage – Zoltán Gera and Bobby Zamora both bagging braces.

In the Football League Trophy, both the Richards strikers struck down Rochdale with a 2–1 win. League One Carlisle United awaited in the second round at Brunton Park and vanquished the "Valiants" on penalties following a 2–2 draw.

== Results ==
=== Football League Two ===
==== League table ====
Pos	Team	Pld	W	D	L	GF	GA	GD	Pts
9	Rotherham United	46	17	15	14	75	60	+15	66
10	Crewe Alexandra	46	18	11	17	87	65	+22	65
11	Port Vale	46	17	14	15	54	49	+5	65
12	Oxford United	46	17	12	17	58	60	−2	63
13	Southend United	46	16	13	17	62	56	+6	61

Updated to match(es) played on 28 May 2011. Source: The Football League
Rules for classification: 1) points; 2) goal difference; 3) number of goals scored.

==== Results by matchday ====
Round	1	2	3	4	5	6	7	8	9	10	11	12	13	14	15	16	17	18	19	20	21	22	23	24	25	26	27	28	29	30	31	32	33	34	35	36	37	38	39	40	41	42	43	44	45	46
Ground	A	H	A	H	A	H	A	H	H	A	A	H	A	H	A	A	H	A	A	A	A	H	A	H	H	A	H	A	H	H	H	A	H	A	H	A	H	H	H	A	H	A	H	A	H	A
Result	W	D	W	L	W	W	W	W	W	L	D	D	D	W	D	D	W	W	L	L	L	W	L	L	D	L	W	D	D	W	L	W	W	D	L	L	D	D	W	L	D	D	L	L	W	L
Position	7	6	4	5	4	3	2	1	1	1	1	2	2	2	2	2	2	1	2	2	4	4	4	5	5	6	5	5	7	5	6	6	6	6	7	8	9	9	7	9	9	9	10	10	9	11
Points	3	4	7	7	10	13	16	19	22	22	23	24	25	28	29	30	33	36	36	36	36	39	39	39	40	40	43	44	45	48	48	51	54	55	55	55	56	57	60	60	61	62	62	62	65	65

Source: Statto
A = Away; H = Home; W = Win; D = Draw; L = Loss

==== Matches ====
7 August 2010 1	Bury	0–1	Port Vale	Bury, Greater Manchester
		Report	Collins 66'	Stadium: Gigg Lane; Attendance: 4,681; Referee: Bobby Madley

14 August 2010 2	Port Vale	1–1	Chesterfield	Burslem
	M.Richards 12'	Report	Mattis 79'	Stadium: Vale Park; Attendance: 6,444; Referee: Karl Evans

21 August 2010 3	Southend United	1–3	Port Vale	Southend-on-Sea
	Owen 88' (og.)	Report	J.Richards 5'; Dodds 54'; M.Richards 83'	Stadium: Roots Hall; Attendance: 4,946; Referee: Roger East

28 August 2010 4	Port Vale	1–2	Torquay United	Burslem
	Griffith 37'	Report	Wroe 5' (pen.); Zebroski 28'	Stadium: Vale Park; Attendance: 5,750; Referee: Geoff Eltringham

4 September 2010 5	Bradford City	0–2	Port Vale	Bradford
		Report	M.Richards 32'; J.Richards 75'	Stadium: Valley Parade; Attendance: 10,834; Referee: David Coote

11 September 2010 6	Port Vale	1–0	Aldershot Town	Burslem
	Roberts 10'	Report		Stadium: Vale Park; Attendance: 5,360; Referee: Mark Brown

18 September 2010 7	Macclesfield Town	0–3	Port Vale	Macclesfield
		Report	M.Richards 30', 87'; Rigg 71'	Stadium: Moss Rose; Attendance: 3,915; Referee: Michael Oliver

25 September 2010 8	Port Vale	2–0	Accrington Stanley	Burslem
	M.Richards 31'; Dodds 81'	Report		Stadium: Vale Park; Attendance: 5,777; Referee: Trevor Kettle

28 September 2010 9	Port Vale	1–0	Shrewsbury Town	Burslem
	Roberts 73'	Report		Stadium: Vale Park; Attendance: 8,443; Referee: Scott Mathieson

2 October 2010 10	Oxford United	2–1	Port Vale	Oxford
	Craddock 61'; Green 90'	Report	Owen 90'	Stadium: Kassam Stadium; Attendance: 7,947; Referee: Gavin Ward

9 October 2010 11	Hereford United	1–1	Port Vale	Hereford
	Canham 15'	Report	M.Richards 28' (pen.)	Stadium: Edgar Street; Attendance: 2,651; Referee: Danny McDermid

16 October 2010 12	Port Vale	0–0	Gillingham	Burslem
		Report		Stadium: Vale Park; Attendance: 6,420; Referee: Carl Boyeson

23 October 2010 13	Cheltenham Town	0–0	Port Vale	Cheltenham
		Report		Stadium: Whaddon Road; Attendance: 3,167; Referee: Dean Whitestone

30 October 2010 14	Port Vale	2–1	Crewe Alexandra	Burslem
	Dodds 13'; M.Richards 74' (pen.)	Report	Donaldson 82' (pen.)	Stadium: Vale Park; Attendance: 8,607; Referee: Anthony Taylor

2 November 2010 15	Burton Albion	0–0	Port Vale	Burton upon Trent
		Report		Stadium: Pirelli Stadium; Attendance: 4,027; Referee: Peter Quinn

13 November 2010 16	Northampton Town	0–0	Port Vale	Northampton
		Report		Stadium: Sixfields Stadium; Attendance: 4,612; Referee: Iain Williamson

20 November 2010 17	Port Vale	2–1	Wycombe Wanderers	Burslem
	McCombe 11', 61'	Report	Winfield 16'	Stadium: Vale Park; Attendance: 5,587; Referee: Jon Moss

23 November 2010 18	Stockport County	0–5	Port Vale	Stockport
		Report	Rigg 23'; M.Richards 44' (pen.), 62' (pen.); J.Richards 90'; Speight 90'	Stadium: Edgeley Park; Attendance: 4,571; Referee: Colin Webster

11 December 2010 19	Morecambe	1–0	Port Vale	Morecambe
	Charnock 27'	Report		Stadium: Globe Arena; Attendance: 2,326; Referee: Rob Shoebridge

28 December 2010 20	Gillingham	3–0	Port Vale	Gillingham, Kent
15:00 GMT	McDonald 1', 37'; Akinfenwa 60'	Report		Stadium: Priestfield Stadium; Attendance: 5,364; Referee: Fred Graham

1 January 2011 21	Rotherham United	5–0	Port Vale	Sheffield
	Law 10'; Taylor 18', 68'; Atkinson 46'; Randall 85'	Report		Stadium: Don Valley Stadium; Attendance: 3,994; Referee: Graham Salisbury

3 January 2011 22	Port Vale	2–1	Burton Albion	Burslem
15:00 GMT	McCombe 4'; J.Richards 6'	Report	Harrad 60'	Stadium: Vale Park; Attendance: 5,681; Referee: Michael Naylor

15 January 2011 23	Crewe Alexandra	2–1	Port Vale	Crewe
	Miller 18'; Dugdale 81'	Report	J.Richards 58' (pen.)	Stadium: Gresty Road; Attendance: 7,183; Referee: Steve Tanner

22 January 2011 24	Port Vale	0–1	Cheltenham Town	Burslem
		Report	Goulding 55'	Stadium: Vale Park; Attendance: 5,163; Referee: Paul Tierney

25 January 2011 25	Port Vale	0–0	Barnet	Burslem
		Report		Stadium: Vale Park; Attendance: 4,112; Referee: David Webb

29 January 2011 26	Lincoln City	1–0	Port Vale	Lincoln
	Grimes 86'	Report		Stadium: Sincil Bank; Attendance: 3,370; Referee: Andy Woolmer

1 February 2011 27	Port Vale	1–0	Rotherham United	Burslem
	O'Shea 53'	Report		Stadium: Vale Park; Attendance: 4,515; Referee: Karl Evans

5 February 2011 28	Wycombe Wanderers	1–1	Port Vale	High Wycombe
	Donnelly 57'	Report	Johnson 47' (og.)	Stadium: Adams Park; Attendance: 4,173; Referee: Gary Sutton

12 February 2011 29	Port Vale	1–1	Northampton Town	Burslem
	J.Richards 55' (pen.)	Report	McKenzie 58'	Stadium: Vale Park; Attendance: 5,321; Referee: Brendan Malone

18 February 2011 30	Port Vale	2–1	Bradford City	Burslem
	Pope 49', 64'	Report	Adeyemi 84'	Stadium: Vale Park; Attendance: 4,775; Referee: Gavin Ward

22 February 2011 31	Port Vale	1–3	Stevenage	Burslem
	Morsy 56'	Report	Griffith 33' (og.); Winn 40'; Bridges 67'	Stadium: Vale Park; Attendance: 4,588; Referee: Neil Swarbrick

26 February 2011 32	Aldershot Town	1–2	Port Vale	Aldershot
	Vincenti 68'	Report	McCombe 26'; M.Richards 51'	Stadium: Recreation Ground; Attendance: 2,506; Referee: Iain Williamson

5 March 2011 33	Port Vale	2–1	Macclesfield Town	Burslem
	Collins 28'; Dodds 87'	Report	Barnett 90'	Stadium: Vale Park; Attendance: 5,459; Referee: Andy Haines

8 March 2011 34	Shrewsbury Town	2–2	Port Vale	Shrewsbury
	Ainsworth 30'; Collins 72'	Report	M.Richards 29', 83' (pen.)	Stadium: New Meadow; Attendance: 6,402; Referee: Phil Gibbs

12 March 2011 35	Port Vale	1–2	Oxford United	Burslem
	M.Richards 27'	Report	Midson 33'; Worley 58'	Stadium: Vale Park; Attendance: 5,661; Referee: Paul Tierney

19 March 2011 36	Accrington Stanley	3–0	Port Vale	Accrington
	McConville 43'; Craney 86'; Procter 90'	Report		Stadium: Crown Ground; Attendance: 2,413; Referee: Dave Foster

22 March 2011 37	Port Vale	1–1	Hereford United	Burslem
	Pope 90'	Report	McQuilkin 76'	Stadium: Vale Park; Attendance: 4,869; Referee: Darren Deadman

26 March 2011 38	Port Vale	0–0	Bury	Burslem
13:00 GMT		Report		Stadium: Vale Park; Attendance: 5,510; Referee: Darren Sheldrake

29 March 2011 39	Port Vale	2–1	Lincoln City	Burslem
	M.Richards 59'; Loft 70'	Report	McCallum 3'	Stadium: Vale Park; Attendance: 4,636; Referee: Russell Booth

2 April 2011 40	Chesterfield	2–0	Port Vale	Chesterfield, Derbyshire
	Lester 48'; Smalley 71'	Report		Stadium: b2net Stadium; Attendance: 8,606; Referee: Steve Tanner

9 April 2011 41	Port Vale	1–1	Southend United	Burslem
	R.Taylor 25'	Report	Prosser 90'	Stadium: Vale Park; Attendance: 5,108; Referee: Phil Gibbs

16 April 2011 42	Torquay United	0–0	Port Vale	Torquay
		Report		Stadium: Plainmoor; Attendance: 3,726; Referee: David Phillips

23 April 2011 43	Port Vale	1–2	Stockport County	Burslem
	Rigg 55'	Report	Elding 20', 87'	Stadium: Vale Park; Attendance: 5,334; Referee: Peter Quinn

25 April 2011 44	Stevenage	1–0	Port Vale	Stevenage
15:00 BST	Wilson	Report		Stadium: Broadhall Way; Attendance: 3,146; Referee: Jock Waugh

30 April 2011 45	Port Vale	7–2	Morecambe	Burslem
	Dodds 17', 58', 67'; M.Richards 21'; J.Richards 40', 45', 90'	Report	Jevons 32'; Spencer 79'	Stadium: Vale Park; Attendance: 4,134; Referee: Rob Lewis

7 May 2011 46	Barnet	1–0	Port Vale	Chipping Barnet, London
	McLeod 48' (pen.)	Report		Stadium: Underhill Stadium; Attendance: 4,478; Referee: Roger East

=== FA Cup ===
6 November 2010 R1	Dartford	1–1	Port Vale	Dartford
	Bradbrook 39'	Report	McCombe 84'	Stadium: Princes Park; Attendance: 3,679; Referee: Phil Gibbs

16 November 2010 Replay	Port Vale	4–0	Dartford	Burslem
	M.Richards 17', 26' (pen.); Rigg 57'; J.Richards 72'			Stadium: Vale Park; Attendance: 3,590; Referee: Mark Haywood

26 November 2010 R2	Port Vale	1–0	Accrington Stanley	Burslem
	J.Richards 24'	Report		Stadium: Vale Park; Attendance: 4,016; Referee: Darren Sheldrake

8 January 2011 R3	Burnley	4–2	Port Vale	Burnley
	Carlisle 4'; Mears 21'; Eagles 50'; Alexander 76' (pen.)	Report	R.Taylor	Stadium: Turf Moor; Attendance: 9,442; Referee: Eddie Ilderton

=== League Cup ===
10 August 2010 R1	Queens Park Rangers	1–3	Port Vale	Shepherd's Bush, West London
	German 62'	Report	J.Richards 30', 48'; Rigg 36'	Stadium: Loftus Road; Attendance: 6,619; Referee: Gary Sutton

25 August 2010 R2	Fulham	6–0	Port Vale	Fulham, West London
20:00 BST	Gera 10', 45'; Dembélé 26'; Zamora 36', 66'; Dempsey 70'	Report		Stadium: Craven Cottage; Attendance: 9,031; Referee: Andy Penn

=== Football League Trophy ===
31 August 2010 R1	Port Vale	2–1	Rochdale	Burslem
	M.Richards 27'; J.Richards 70'	Report	Done 79'	Stadium: Vale Park; Attendance: 2,442; Referee: Michel Mayor

5 October 2010 R2	Carlisle United	2–2 (4–3 p)	Port Vale	Carlisle
	Chester 76'; Price 81'	Report	Norwood 42' (og.); M.Richards 64'	Stadium: Brunton Park; Attendance: 2,273; Referee: Dave Foster
	Penalties
	Curran (penalty missed); Hurst (penalty scored); Berrett (penalty scored); Robson (penalty scored); Simek (penalty scored)		M. Richards (penalty scored); Roberts (penalty scored); J. Richards (penalty scored); Fraser (penalty missed); Dodds (penalty missed)

== Squad statistics ==
=== Appearances and goals ===
Key to positions: GK – Goalkeeper; DF – Defender; MF – Midfielder; FW – Forward

No.	Pos	Nat	Player	Total		League Two		FA Cup		League Cup		EFL Trophy	
No.	Pos	Nat	Player	Apps	Goals	Apps	Goals	Apps	Goals	Apps	Goals	Apps	Goals
1	GK	(England) ENG	Chris Martin	16	0	14	0	0	0	0	0	2	0
2	DF	(England) ENG	Adam Yates	54	0	46	0	4	0	2	0	2	0
3	MF	(England) ENG	Rob Taylor	41	3	36	1	3	2	1	0	1	0
4	MF	(Montserrat) MSR	Anthony Griffith	45	1	40	1	2	0	2	0	1	0
5	DF	(England) ENG	John McCombe	48	5	42	4	4	1	2	0	0	0
6	DF	(Wales) WAL	Gareth Owen	43	1	36	1	4	0	2	0	1	0
7	MF	(England) ENG	Doug Loft	34	1	29	1	3	0	1	0	1	0
8	MF	(England) ENG	Louis Dodds	41	7	33	7	4	0	2	0	2	0
9	FW	(England) ENG	Marc Richards	46	20	40	16	2	2	2	0	2	2
10	MF	(England) ENG	Dominic Blizzard	1	0	1	0	0	0	0	0	0	0
11	FW	(England) ENG	Justin Richards	50	14	42	9	4	2	2	2	2	1
12	GK	(England) ENG	Stuart Tomlinson	42	0	36	0	4	0	2	0	0	0
14	MF	(England) ENG	Kris Taylor	26	0	20	0	3	0	1	0	2	0
15	DF	(England) ENG	Lee Collins	48	2	42	2	2	0	2	0	2	0
16	MF	(Wales) WAL	Lewis Haldane	27	0	23	0	4	0	0	0	0	0
17	MF	(England) ENG	Sean Rigg	33	5	26	3	4	1	2	1	1	0
18	MF	(Egypt) EGY	Sam Morsy	17	1	16	1	0	0	0	0	1	0
19	DF	(England) ENG	Exodus Geohaghon	12	0	12	0	0	0	0	0	0	0
20	DF	(British Virgin Islands) VGB	Matthew Bell	0	0	0	0	0	0	0	0	0	0
21	DF	(England) ENG	Ritchie Sutton	13	0	11	0	0	0	0	0	2	0
22	MF	(England) ENG	Gary Roberts	43	2	35	2	4	0	2	0	2	0
23	FW	(England) ENG	Kristian Cox	1	0	1	0	0	0	0	0	0	0
24	GK	(England) ENG	Sam Johnson	0	0	0	0	0	0	0	0	0	0
25	DF	(England) ENG	Joe Davis	1	0	1	0	0	0	0	0	0	0
27	MF	(England) ENG	Ryan Lloyd	1	0	1	0	0	0	0	0	0	0
Players who featured but departed the club during the season:
10	MF	(England) ENG	Tommy Fraser	20	0	12	0	4	0	2	0	2	0
10	MF	(Republic of Ireland) IRL	Jay O'Shea	5	1	5	1	0	0	0	0	0	0
19	FW	(England) ENG	Anthony Malbon	2	0	2	0	0	0	0	0	0	0
23	MF	(England) ENG	Abdulai Bell-Baggie	5	0	3	0	0	0	1	0	1	0
23	MF	(United States) USA	Jemal Johnson	7	0	6	0	0	0	0	0	1	0
23	FW	(England) ENG	Jake Speight	4	1	4	1	0	0	0	0	0	0
27	MF	(England) ENG	Kayleden Brown	4	0	4	0	0	0	0	0	0	0
28	MF	(Saint Kitts and Nevis) SKN	Romaine Sawyers	1	0	1	0	0	0	0	0	0	0
29	FW	(England) ENG	Tom Pope	13	3	13	3	0	0	0	0	0	0

=== Top scorers ===
Place	Position	Nation	Number	Name	League Two	FA Cup	League Cup	Football League Trophy	Total
1	FW	England	9	Marc Richards	16	2	0	2	20
2	FW	England	11	Justin Richards	9	2	2	1	14
3	MF	England	8	Louis Dodds	7	0	0	0	7
4	DF	England	5	John McCombe	4	1	0	0	5
–	MF	England	17	Sean Rigg	3	1	1	0	5
6	FW	England	29	Tom Pope	3	0	0	0	3
–	MF	England	3	Rob Taylor	1	1	1	0	3
8	MF	England	2	Gary Roberts	2	0	0	0	2
–	DF	England	15	Lee Collins	2	0	0	0	2
10	DF	Wales	6	Gareth Owen	1	0	0	0	1
–	MF	Montserrat	4	Anthony Griffith	1	0	0	0	1
–	FW	England	23	Jake Speight	1	0	0	0	1
–	MF	Ireland	10	Jay O'Shea	1	0	0	0	1
–	MF	Egypt	18	Sam Morsy	1	0	0	0	1
–	MF	England	7	Doug Loft	1	0	0	0	1
				TOTALS	53	7	4	3	67

=== Disciplinary record ===
Number	Nation	Position	Name	League One		FA Cup		EFL Cup		EFL Trophy		Total	
Number	Nation	Position	Name	Yellow card	Red card	Yellow card	Red card	Yellow card	Red card	Yellow card	Red card	Yellow card	Red card
4	Montserrat	MF	Anthony Griffith	9	1	0	0	0	0	0	0	9	1
9	England	FW	Marc Richards	6	1	0	0	0	0	0	0	6	1
12	England	GK	Stuart Tomlinson	3	1	0	0	0	0	0	0	3	1
6	Wales	DF	Gareth Owen	2	1	0	0	0	0	0	0	2	1
17	England	MF	Sean Rigg	1	1	0	0	1	0	0	0	2	1
22	England	MF	Gary Roberts	12	0	1	0	0	0	0	0	13	0
5	England	DF	John McCombe	9	0	1	0	0	0	0	0	10	0
15	England	DF	Lee Collins	7	0	0	0	0	0	0	0	7	0
2	England	DF	Adam Yates	4	0	0	0	0	0	0	0	4	0
19	England	DF	Exodus Geohaghon	3	0	0	0	0	0	0	0	3	0
18	Egypt	MF	Sam Morsy	2	0	1	0	0	0	0	0	3	0
11	England	FW	Justin Richards	3	0	0	0	0	0	0	0	3	0
3	England	MF	Rob Taylor	3	0	0	0	0	0	0	0	3	0
8	England	MF	Louis Dodds	2	0	0	0	0	0	0	0	2	0
7	England	MF	Doug Loft	2	0	0	0	0	0	0	0	2	0
10	England	MF	Tommy Fraser	1	0	0	0	0	0	0	0	1	0
16	Wales	MF	Lewis Haldane	1	0	0	0	0	0	0	0	1	0
29	England	FW	Tom Pope	1	0	0	0	0	0	0	0	1	0
21	England	DF	Ritchie Sutton	1	0	0	0	0	0	0	0	1	0
14	England	MF	Kris Taylor	1	0	0	0	0	0	0	0	1	0
			TOTALS	73	5	3	0	1	0	0	0	77	5

Sourced from Soccerway.

== Awards ==
End of Season Awards	Winner
Player of the Year	John McCombe
Away Travel Player of the Year	John McCombe
Mr Shirt Off The Back	Louis Dodds
Players' Player of the Year	John McCombe
Young Player of the Year	Sam Morsy
Youth Player of the Year	Charlie Raglan
Chairman's Player of the Year	Gareth Owen
Goal of the Season	Marc Richards (vs Accrington Stanley, 25 September 2010)

== Transfers ==
=== Transfers in ===
Date from	Position	Nationality	Name	From	Fee	Ref.
27 May 2010	FW	ENG	Sean Rigg	Bristol Rovers	Free transfer	
29 May 2010	GK	ENG	Stuart Tomlinson	Barrow	Free transfer (Bosman)	
11 June 2010	FW	ENG	Justin Richards	Cheltenham Town	Free transfer (Bosman)	
20 July 2010	DF	ENG	Ritchie Sutton	Nantwich Town	Free transfer	
27 July 2010	MF	ENG	Gary Roberts	Rotherham United	Free transfer	

=== Transfers out ===
Date from	Position	Nationality	Name	To	Fee	Ref.
12 May 2010	FW	ENG	Geoff Horsfield	Became coach		
20 May 2010	GK	ENG	Joe Anyon	Lincoln City	1 July 2010	
21 June 2010	GK	ENG	Daniel Lloyd-Weston	Cheltenham Town	1 July 2010	
1 July 2010	DF	ENG	Luke Prosser	Southend United	31 July 2010	
1 July 2010	FW	ENG	Danny Glover	Worcester City	6 August 2010	
1 July 2010	MF	ENG	Ross Davidson	Stafford Rangers	?	
19 November 2010	FW	ENG	Anthony Malbon	Leek Town	20 November 2010	
19 January 2011	MF	ENG	Tommy Fraser	Barnet	20 January 2011	

=== Loans in ===
Start date	Position	Nationality	Name	From	End date	Ref.
13 August 2010	MF	SLE	Abdulai Bell-Baggie	Reading	13 September 2010	
16 September 2010	FW	USA	Jemal Johnson	Milton Keynes Dons	16 October 2010	
29 October 2010	FW	ENG	Jake Speight	Bradford City	4 January 2011	
20 January 2011	FW	IRL	Jay O'Shea	Birmingham City	23 February 2011	
21 January 2011	MF	ENG	Romaine Sawyers	West Bromwich Albion	23 February 2011	
21 January 2011	MF	WAL	Kayleden Brown	West Bromwich Albion	23 February 2011	
24 January 2011	DF	ENG	Exodus Geohaghon	Peterborough United	End of season	
28 January 2011	FW	ENG	Tom Pope	Rotherham United	7 April 2011	
18 March 2011	MF	ENG	Dominic Blizzard	Bristol Rovers	End of season	

=== Loans out ===
Start date	Position	Nationality	Name	From	End date	Ref.
11 October 2010	FW	ENG	Anthony Malbon	Newcastle Town	19 November 2010	
