= Bill Bratt =

English football chairman

Bill Bratt MBE
- Born: William Amos Bratt; 1945 (age 80–81)
- Occupation: Insurance broker

Chairman of Port Vale
- In office 2003–2011
- Preceded by: Bill Bell
- Succeeded by: Mike Lloyd

William Amos Bratt MBE (born 1945) is an English insurance broker and former football club chairman who was the chair of Port Vale from 2003 to 2011.

After decades working in the insurance industry, Bratt turned his attention to his hometown, Port Vale, after the club faced dark times. Leading the 'Valiant 2001' supporter's trust, he gained control from the administrators and previous chairman Bill Bell in 2003. He then battled to steady the club's finances while advancing through the leagues. Though the team fared poorly on the pitch throughout his reign, falling to the bottom tier of the Football League, he managed to keep the club afloat financially, though still the club continued to lose money. He left the club after fan protests against his chairmanship.

== Early life ==
Bratt's stepfather was a World War II veteran who was taken by the Japanese as a prisoner of war. After the war, his father appeared to be mentally scarred from his time in POW camps and regularly beat him, he apologised to his son whilst on his deathbed. He died in the 1960s of cancer.

He lived in numerous children's homes in the Penkhull area before becoming a miner at Chatterley Whitfield pit in 1959. The charity he received from members of the church helped to instil Christian beliefs that he holds to this day (as of June 2009). From an early age he was a Port Vale supporter, something which would have a significant impact upon his life in the future.

== Business life ==
Bratt worked in several coal mines but was forced to retire after a motorcycle accident severely damaged his left hand; he is now without a left thumb. He then tried several jobs, including selling encyclopaedias. However, Bratt built up his business acumen and earned a healthy income as an insurance broker over 30 years.

During this time, he also started a family - a son and a daughter.

== Chairmanship of Port Vale ==
=== Early years ===
In 2001, Bratt was involved with a consortium of fans and local businessmen under the banner "Valiant 2001", started by Charles Machin, which started moves towards attaining ownership of the club, including several offers that were rejected by chairman Bill Bell. The club went into administration under Bell in December 2002. Valiant 2001 eventually secured control of the club after a long and drawn-out process as the 2002–03 season neared its close. Their takeover bid beat that of a 'mystery bidder'. Bratt had been a lifelong supporter of the club when he took the chairman position in 2003.

The Valiant2001 Charter, drafted by Charles Machin, listed ten points:

- One: Set aside a £1.5 million first-team budget
- Two: Introduce supporter-friendly ticket pricing
- Three: Complete the Lorne Street stand
- Four: Sort out the pitch (install under-soil heating)
- Five: Make savings of over £80,000
- Six: Make Port Vale a fan-friendly football club
- Seven: Make Port Vale a community-friendly football club
- Eight: Run the club openly and democratically (at least two supporter-directors on the board)
- Nine: Improve the club's relations
- Ten: Be open, honest, professional and accountable

Bratt put a large portion of the club's shares up for sale in February 2006. Robbie Williams bought £240,000 worth of the £250,000 worth of available shares in the club. Castle Comfort Stairlifts, the club's sponsors, at the same time bought the remainder for £10,000. Three months later Bratt also took up the role of Chief executive officer.

Under Bratt's chairmanship, the club were relegated to the bottom tier of English league football after a dismal 2007–08 season. Bratt and his board of directors appointed five managers throughout their reign; Martin Foyle in 2004, Lee Sinnott in 2007, Dean Glover in 2008, Micky Adams in 2009, Jim Gannon in 2011, and Adams again in 2011.

=== Troubled relationship with the fans ===
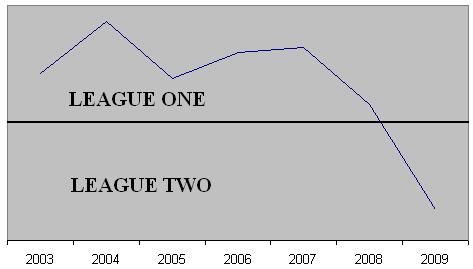
Under Bratt, the club maintained their League One status, before a drop down the divisions which was only reversed when Micky Adams' appointment sparked a revival.

In February 2009, with the club languishing near the bottom of the Football League, closer to relegation than the play-offs, many Vale fans organized protests against manager Glover and the board, including Bratt. With talks of fresh investment from shirt sponsors Harlequin Property came rumours on the internet that the company were planning to demolish Vale Park and build a supermarket, paying off Bratt to ensure his compliance. Bratt passionately denied these accusations, seemingly angered by the suggestion and claimed that if he were to comply with the protesters demands and remove himself and the rest of the V-2001 directors from the Board, then the club would fold as banks and creditors would seek their money. He also reiterated his prior statements by stating that he would be prepared to leave his position if the right offer were to be made.

As chairman, he was sometimes criticized for the board's perceived unprofessional practices. Critics cited the phone vote that was arranged to sack Sinnott and how experienced midfielder Dave Brammer was released- informing him via voicemail. Sinnott later took the club to court for breach of contract. The appointment of Dean Glover was also unpopular with fans. Protests formed by fans against Glover and the board gave Bratt little option than to sack Glover, with season ticket sales seriously affected by disillusioned supporters. With a serious dent into his reputation he built as a player at the club, Glover left the club completely, However, Bratt and the board stayed in place despite growing resentment from some corners.

Bratt was appointed Member of the Order of the British Empire (MBE) in the 2009 Birthday Honours for services to sport. In the summer of 2009 he collapsed and was paralysed from the waist down, he made a full recovery though after undergoing surgery at the University Hospital of North Staffordshire. Despite the club's recent troubles on the pitch, Bratt was delighted with the overwhelming support he received from the fans during his recovery: "I have had lots of cards, text messages and phone calls, so I'd like to thank everyone for that."

In July 2009, Bratt spoke out to publicly deny rumours spread on Vale fan sites, specifically rumours of sponsorship deals with Basement Jaxx and Maplin Electronics. Bratt said the rumours were "inaccurate, spurious and damaging", claiming the speculation could damage genuine and confidential negotiations. The next month he was able to say "we got the right man" in appointing Micky Adams, following a 2–1 win over Sheffield United in the League Cup. There also came statements that shirt sponsors Harlequin Property would invest £500,000 into the club, though this never materialized. Reports that Andy Townsend would be appointed as a football advisor also surfaced, but never transpired.

Bratt said he planned to stand down at the end of the 2009–10 season. However, when investor Mike Newton was willing to invest £400,000 in the club and take the chair of the board at the season's end, Bratt claimed to be unhappy with Newton's policy of negotiating in public (who had by then upped his offer to £500,000), and so Bratt remained chairman for the 2010–11 season. Newton claimed that his "efforts to become chairman and to invest in the club have been hampered and made almost impossible" by Bratt and his board, and said that the reasons giving to reject his investment were "one long round of excuses". Bratt also denied claims by Newton that the club were heading for administration under his leadership. In September 2010 Bratt gave up his role as Chief Executive, but remained as chairman, denying that this decision was influenced by the recent Newton takeover bid. By this time the club's debts were estimated at £2m, a level described by Bratt as "manageable".

In September 2010, Bratt owned £44,120 of the club's £1.132m shares, with the nine-man board's total share value at £359,400. In December 2010 local businessman and Water World owner Mo Chaudry went public with his investment proposal for the club, However, Bratt said it was the first he had heard of the proposal, despite Chandry's legal advisor's claims they had spoken and that "it was made clear to me the club wasn't interested in selling to Mo Chaudry." The board swiftly and unanimously rejected the £1.3 million proposal. Following another anti-board protest from Vale supporters and the resignation of director Mike Thompstone following a vote of no confidence at a supporter shareholder meeting, Bratt and his team decided to re-examine the Chaudry bid. In January 2011, another group of prospective investors, this time a group of Texas businessmen, announced they had pulled out of talks with Bratt's board. The group said: "the deal is completely dead because the directors don't want to sell the club... we believe they [the Vale] are run by the wrong people... [and] we didn't get anything apart from a cup of tea before watching a game." Fans began a protest movement called "Black and Gold Until it's Sold" - inspired by Manchester United's anti-Glazer scarf protest - in which fans wear black and gold scarves to symbolize their opposition to Bratt and the board. Despite this Chaudry's takeover deadline passed without comment from the Vale board, though another director, Paul Humphreys, resigned his position. After the board shunned a further joint offer by Chaudry and Mark Sims, Sims stated that he was "thoroughly disillusioned with the current board and, as a lifelong fan, I'm devastated by this season's promotion failure and the demise of our club over the past decade."

After an EGM was called on 1 June 2011, Bratt and his four fellow directors faced a vote to remove them. With major shareholders Robbie Williams and Broxap owner Robert Lee throwing their support behind Chaudry, few believed Bratt could survive the EGM. Despite a vote of no confidence in the board and directors Peter Jackson and Stan Meigh being voted out, Bratt and two other directors survived their individual votes. This was thanks to a last-minute decision by Lee to sell to an unnamed director and not Chaudry. Despite this, Bratt resigned as chairman on 29 July 2011, citing his wish to unite the fans and to leave behind the "hate" levelled at him in "the last 12 months" by his detractors. He remained a director, and he was a member of the board in September 2011, when it was announced that sports construction firm Blue Sky International were planning to plough £5 million into the club in twelve months, as well as a further £2.5 million by 2016. This sum would secure the long-term future of the club. He resigned as a director in October 2011. Two months later, the deal was shown to have had no substantive basis. He later became chairman of minor non-League side Stone Town.
