= Exodus Geohaghon =

English footballer (born 1985)

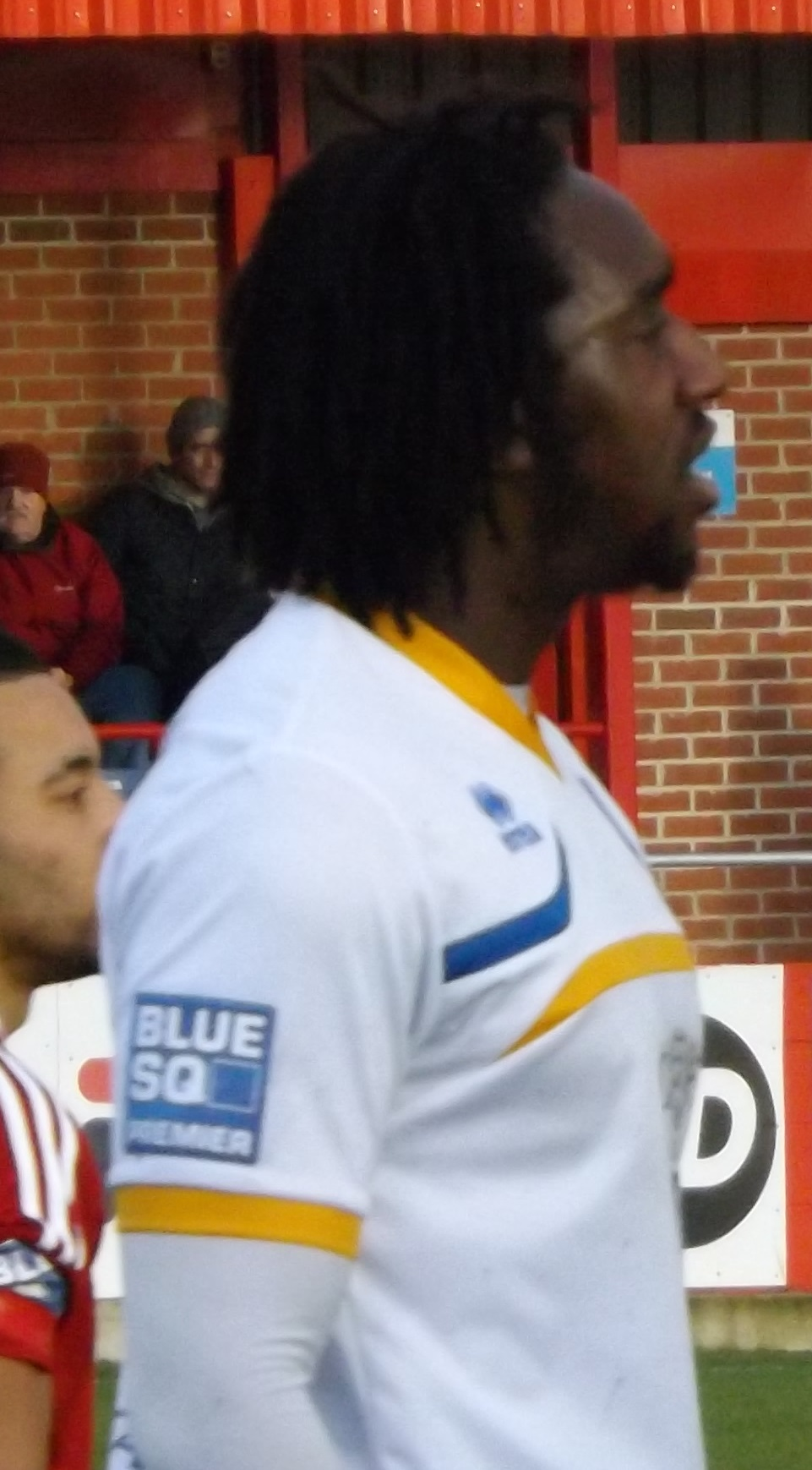
- Geohaghon playing for Mansfield Town in 2013

Personal information
- Full name: Exodus Isaac Geohaghon
- Date of birth: 27 February 1985 (age 41)
- Place of birth: Birmingham, England
- Height: 6 ft 5 in (1.96 m)
- Positions: Defender; midfielder

Youth career
- West Bromwich Albion

Senior career*
Years	Team	Apps	(Gls)
2000–2005	Sutton Coldfield Town		
2005–2006	Bromsgrove Rovers	34	(2)
2006–2008	Redditch United	71	(1)
2008–2010	Kettering Town	63	(0)
2009–2010	→ Peterborough United (loan)	7	(1)
2010–2011	Peterborough United	12	(0)
2010	→ Rotherham United (loan)	14	(1)
2010	→ Shrewsbury Town (loan)	2	(0)
2011	→ Port Vale (loan)	12	(0)
2011	Barnet	2	(0)
2011–2012	Darlington	5	(0)
2011–2012	→ Dagenham & Redbridge (loan)	2	(0)
2012	→ Mansfield Town (loan)	13	(2)
2012	Kidderminster Harriers	3	(0)
2012–2013	Mansfield Town	17	(2)
2013	Worcester City	6	(2)
2013–2014	Braintree Town	3	(0)
2014	Solihull Moors	13	(0)
2014	Nuneaton Town	8	(0)
2014	Whitehawk	1	(0)
2014–2015	Stourbridge		
2015–2016	Torquay United	18	(1)
2016–2017	Nuneaton Town	13	(0)
2017	Stafford Rangers		
2017	Nuneaton Town	2	(0)
2017–2018	Halesowen Town		
2018	Barwell	1	(0)
2018–2019	Highgate United		
2019–2020	Gresley	7	(0)
2024	Shepshed Dynamo	3	(0)

International career
2008–2009	England C	2	(0)

Managerial career
- 2026: Darlaston Town 1874
- * Club domestic league appearances and goals

Exodus Isaac Geohaghon (born 27 February 1985) is an English football manager and former player.

Spending some time in his youth with West Bromwich Albion, he played as a defender for Sutton Coldfield Town between 2000 and 2005. After a season with Bromsgrove Rovers and two with Redditch United, he then signed with Kettering Town. In 2010, he moved up to the English Football League, moving to Peterborough United after a loan spell. Whilst at Peterborough, he was loaned out to Rotherham United, Shrewsbury Town, and Port Vale. He joined Barnet in August 2011 before he signed with Darlington two months later. He joined Dagenham & Redbridge on loan in November 2011 before joining Mansfield Town on loan in February 2012. He signed with Kidderminster Harriers in July 2012 before permanently returning to Mansfield less than two months later. He won the Conference Premier title with Mansfield in 2012–13. He spent time with Worcester City in 2013 before ending up at Braintree Town. He joined Solihull Moors in January 2014 before penning a deal at Nuneaton Town in August 2014. Later, in 2014–15, he played for Whitehawk and Stourbridge. He joined Torquay United in July 2015. He returned to Nuneaton Town as a player-coach in November 2016. He later had brief spells at Stafford Rangers, Halesowen Town, Barwell, Highgate United, and Gresley. He was out of the game for four years before joining Shepshed Dynamo in October 2024. He entered management with Darlaston Town 1874 in February 2026.

== Club career ==
=== Early career ===
Geohaghon played for West Bromwich Albion as a youngster. He moved to Sutton Coldfield Town in 2000, before joining Southern Football League side Bromsgrove Rovers in 2005 for an undisclosed fee. He left the club the following summer, and joined Conference North club Redditch United on trial in July 2006, before joining permanently a month later. During two seasons with Redditch, he made 71 league appearances, helping the club to avoid relegation. He was also in attendance at the University of Wolverhampton during his time at Redditch – studying Video and Film Production, he graduated in summer 2008.

=== Kettering Town ===
Geohaghon joined Conference Premier team Kettering Town for an undisclosed five-figure fee on 7 August 2008, after initially joining on a month's loan. He soon became first choice centre-back in the team's defence alongside Guy Branston in the 2008–09 season. Geohaghon's goal at Rockingham Road in the first round of the 2008–09 FA Cup was picked out by Robbie Earle on the ITV "FA Cup Highlights" programme as one of the highlights of the round, as Kettering held League Two club Lincoln City to a 1–1 draw on 8 November 2008. Later that month it was reported that Championship sides Crystal Palace, Sheffield United, and Plymouth Argyle were interested in signing Geohaghon in the 2009 January transfer window. Kettering manager Mark Cooper stated that it would take a "stupid" offer to allow the defender to leave the club.

=== Peterborough United ===
In November 2009, he rejoined his former manager Mark Cooper at Championship side Peterborough United, in a loan deal that would become permanent in January 2010. He was made man of the match on his debut, in a 2–2 draw with Middlesbrough. Geohaghon scored his first goal for Peterborough on 19 December 2009, netting the winner in a 2–1 victory over Watford. His position changed with the arrival of Jim Gannon as manager, and this resulted in "improved and more composed performances" from Geohaghon. Under new manager Gary Johnson he was transfer-listed at the end of the 2009–10 season, just four months into his three-and-a-half-year contract.

He joined Rotherham United on a one-month loan deal for August 2010. The loan was extended to three months after he became a key part of Ronnie Moore's back four. In November of that year Geohaghon joined Shrewsbury Town on loan until January, initially to help solve injury troubles to the team's key defenders Ian Sharps and David Raven. The deal was made just hours before kick-off against local rivals Crewe Alexandra. His loan spell ended prematurely, as after only three starts he picked up a knee injury that kept him in the treatment room for two months. In January 2011, Jim Gannon was appointed as Port Vale manager, and he immediately brought Geohaghon to Vale Park on loan until the end of the season. Throughout just four victories in twelve consecutive games with Geohaghon as a holding midfielder, both he and Gannon became highly unpopular figures with some sections of the Vale support. This culminated in ugly scenes on 19 March, as Geohaghon confronted his detractors following a 3–1 defeat at Accrington Stanley's Crown Ground, with his manager leaving the stadium in secret for his own safety. Though Gannon was unpopular with players and fans, fan favourites and star players Gary Roberts and Marc Richards did stand by Geohaghon, calling the abuse he received "unfair... terrible... not acceptable" and "harsh". Two days later Gannon was sacked. Meanwhile, Geohaghon sought legal advice and claimed his scuffle with supporters came about after he reacted to racial abuse levelled at him by some fans. Unable to return to Peterborough by the terms of his loan, and unwilling to return to Vale Park, Geohaghon instead remained at his Birmingham home whilst the Football Association's investigation of racial abuse continued. The FA found that there was racist chanting from at least one Vale supporter.

=== Later career ===
In August 2011, Geohaghon left Peterborough United by mutual consent. Later that month Geohaghon signed a one-month contract with Barnet following a successful trial period. He played four games in ten days, before leaving the club. In October 2011, he signed up with Conference Premier club Darlington, leaving him to work with manager Mark Cooper for a third time. He made his debut for the club in a 4–3 win over Stockport County, and four days later he set up Jonathan Sanchez-Munoz for the only goal of a 1–0 win at home to Kidderminster Harriers. Despite this, Cooper was sacked on 25 October. On 21 November, Geohaghon returned to League Two football, signing a three-month loan deal with Dagenham & Redbridge. He made his debut at Victoria Park on 12 December, setting up Brian Woodall for the opening goal of a 2–1 defeat to former club Port Vale. Meanwhile, his parent club Darlington were suffering financial difficulties and Geohaghon's contract was terminated on 16 January 2012, along with the rest of the playing squad and caretaker manager Craig Liddle. Darlington held onto his registration, and on 24 February he signed for Conference Premier rivals Mansfield Town on loan until the rest of the season. He scored his first goal in nearly 18 months on 13 March, when he headed in a stoppage-time equaliser in a 1–1 draw with Conference Premier leaders Fleetwood Town at Field Mill. The "Stags" reached the play-offs, but crashed out at the semi-final stage to York City 2–1 on aggregate, with Geohaghon scoring an own goal in the first leg at Bootham Crescent after a communication breakdown with goalkeeper Alan Marriott.

In July 2012, Geohaghon joined Conference Premier side Kidderminster Harriers on a one-year deal. He had previously played under assistant boss Gary Whild during his time at Redditch. However, he re-signed with Mansfield Town on a permanent basis for a £5,000 transfer fee on 31 August, after less than two months at Aggborough; Geohaghon said he had "unfinished business" after Paul Cox's side lost at the play-off semi-final stage the previous season. His long-throws were a crucial part of the club's success in the early part of the 2012–13 season. Mansfield won promotion into the English Football League as Conference Premier champions in 2012–13, though Geoghaghon was not retained beyond the summer as he lost his first-team place in the second half of the season.

He joined Conference North side Worcester City in September 2013. However, his spell lasted just five weeks as he was released after refusing to play in the FA Cup so as not to find himself cup-tied. In November 2013 he signed for Braintree Town. He played three games for the "Iron" before he dropped back into the Conference North to play for Marcus Bignot's Solihull Moors. In August 2014, he joined Nuneaton Town, making his debut in the club's 2–0 away defeat at Braintree on 22 August. Manager Brian Reid stated that "He brings a great deal of experience, is a great size, a leader and a good talker on the park. He also gives us an extra weapon with his long throw, which can be even better than a corner". He left the club the following month after making eight appearances.

Geohaghon played for Whitehawk in the Conference South against Basingstoke Town on 7 October 2014. Later in the year, he signed for Stourbridge of the Northern Premier League Premier Division. After leaving Stourbridge he took up boxing, and took part in two white-collar fights. He signed with National League side Torquay United in July 2015 after impressing manager Paul Cox while on trial at Plainmoor. At the start of the 2015–16 season, Geohaghon stated that he wanted to make Plainmoor "disgusting" for opposition teams to play against. He went on to feature in 18 league games as Torquay posted an 18th-place finish, three points above the relegation zone, and was not offered a contract by new manager Kevin Nicholson. In November 2016, that Geohaghon re-joined Nuneaton Town as a player-coach. He started the 2017–18 season at Stafford Rangers. He left Marston Road for a third spell with Nuneaton Town, with manager Tommy Wright saying "he feels that he has unfinished business here". However, he joined Halesowen Town in December 2017. He started the 2018–19 season at Southern League Premier Division Central side Barwell, before joining Midland League Premier Division side Highgate United in December 2018. In December 2019, Geohaghon joined Gresley in the Midland League Premier Division and played seven games for the "Moatmen" before he left the club again at the end of February 2020.

In October 2024, Geogaghon came out of retirement to join Northern Premier League Division One Midlands side Shepshed Dynamo.

== International career ==
In November 2008, Geohaghon was called into the England C squad by Paul Fairclough for the match against Italy. The game ended in a 2–2 draw, with Geohaghon playing the full game. He also played in a 1–0 defeat against Belgium in May 2009, which was his final game for the team because of age restrictions. Both of these games were part of the 2007–09 International Challenge Trophy.

== Coaching career ==
In February 2026, Geohaghon was appointed manager of Northern Premier League Division One Midlands club Darlaston Town 1874. He left the club on 29 April following what chairman Anthony Follows described as "a difficult run of results".

== Style of play ==
He is known for his long-throwing ability. His 6 ft 5 in (1.96 m) frame also gives him a natural advantage in the air, as well as great ball winning strength.

== Career statistics ==
Appearances and goals by club, season and competition
Club	Season	League			FA Cup		League Cup		Other		Total	
Club	Season	Division	Apps	Goals	Apps	Goals	Apps	Goals	Apps	Goals	Apps	Goals
Bromsgrove Rovers	2005–06	Southern League (West)	34	2			—				34	2
Redditch United	2006–07	Conference North										
Redditch United	2007–08	Conference North										
Redditch United	Total		71	1	0	0	0	0	0	0	71	1
Kettering Town	2008–09	Conference Premier	44	0	7	1	—		1	0	52	1
Kettering Town	2009–10	Conference Premier	19	0	1	0	—		0	0	20	0
Kettering Town	Total		63	0	8	1	0	0	1	0	72	1
Peterborough United	2009–10	Championship	19	1	0	0	0	0	—		19	1
Peterborough United	2010–11	League One	0	0	0	0	0	0	—		0	0
Peterborough United	Total		19	1	0	0	0	0	0	0	19	1
Rotherham United (loan)	2010–11	League Two	14	1	0	0	0	0	0	0	14	1
Shrewsbury Town (loan)	2010–11	League Two	2	0	1	0	0	0	0	0	3	0
Port Vale (loan)	2010–11	League Two	12	0	—		—		—		12	0
Barnet	2011–12	League Two	2	0	0	0	1	0	1	0	4	0
Dagenham & Redbridge (loan)	2011–12	League Two	2	0	0	0	—		—		2	0
Mansfield Town (loan)	2011–12	Conference Premier	13	2	0	0	—		2	0	15	2
Darlington	2011–12	Conference Premier	5	0	0	0	—		0	0	5	0
Kidderminster Harriers	2012–13	Conference Premier	3	0	0	0	—		0	0	3	0
Mansfield Town	2012–13	Conference Premier	17	2	5	0	—		0	0	22	2
Worcester City	2013–14	Conference North	6	2	0	0	—		0	0	6	2
Braintree Town	2013–14	Conference Premier	3	0	0	0	—		0	0	3	0
Solihull Moors	2013–14	Conference North	13	0	0	0	—		0	0	13	0
Nuneaton Town	2014–15	Conference Premier	8	0	0	0	—		0	0	8	0
Whitehawk	2014–15	Conference South	1	0	0	0	—		0	0	1	0
Torquay United	2015–16	National League	18	1	0	0	—		1	0	19	1
Nuneaton Town	2016–17	National League North	2	0	0	0	—		0	0	2	0
Barwell	2018–19	Southern League; Premier Division Central	1	0	0	0	—		1	0	2	0
Gresley	2019–20	Midland League; Premier Division	7	0	0	0	—		1	0	8	0
Shepshed Dynamo	2024–25	Northern Premier League; Division One Midlands	1	0	0	0	—		0	0	1	0
Career total (Note: Complete statistics at Sutton Coldfield Town, Stourbridge, Nuneaton Town, Stafford Rangers, Halesowen Town, and Highgate United are unavailable.)			317	12	14	1	1	0	7	0	339	13
