= Kristian Cox =

English footballer (born 1992)

Personal information
- Full name: Kristian Caleb Cox
- Date of birth: 28 September 1992 (age 34)
- Place of birth: Birmingham, England
- Position: Striker

Youth career
- Port Vale

Senior career*
Years	Team	Apps	(Gls)
2011	Port Vale	1	(0)
2011	Ilkeston	4	(1)
2012	New Mills		
2013	Hyde	0	(0)
2013	Gresley	6	(0)
- * Club domestic league appearances and goals

Kristian Caleb Cox (born 28 September 1992) is an English football striker who has played for Port Vale, Ilkeston, New Mills, Hyde, and Gresley.

== Career ==
Cox started his career in the youth team ranks at Port Vale. He was handed the number 23 shirt for the 2010–11 season, making his debut in a 2–1 defeat at Crewe Alexandra on 15 January 2011 under new manager Jim Gannon. Three months later caretaker manager Mark Grew announced that Cox would not be offered a contract at the club for the following season. He then spent a brief spell with Northern Premier League Division One South club Ilkeston, and scored in the new club's first competitive match in a 4–0 victory over Goole. However, he played just three more times before he left the club in September 2011 to look for a club that offered full-time training. He played for New Mills of the Northern Premier League Division One North in 2012. He signed with Northern Premier League Division One South side Gresley in February 2013 after a spell with Hyde reserves, and made six appearances before leaving in June of that year.

== Career statistics ==
Appearances and goals by club, season and competition
Club	Season	League			FA Cup		Other		Total	
Club	Season	Division	Apps	Goals	Apps	Goals	Apps	Goals	Apps	Goals
Port Vale	2010–11	League Two	1	0	0	0	0	0	1	0
Ilkeston	2011–12	Northern Premier League; Division One South	4	1	0	0	0	0	4	1
Hyde	2013–14	Conference Premier	0	0	0	0	1 (Note: Appearance in the Manchester Premier Cup)	0	1	0
Gresley	2013–14	Northern Premier League; Division One South	6	0	0	0	0	0	6	0
Career total			11	1	0	0	1	0	12	1
