= Stoke-on-Trent Garden Festival =

1986 event

Coordinates: 53°1′52″N 2°11′46″W

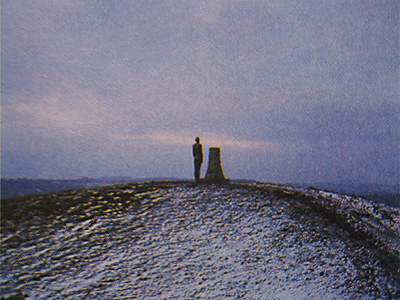
Antony Gormley sculpture, "A View, A Place", 1986. It was sited at the festival's highest point looking out over the Fowlea Valley, next to the OS trigonometry marker-stone. The site is now completely enclosed by woodland.

The Stoke-on-Trent National Garden Festival was the second of Britain's national garden festivals. It was held in the city from 1 May to 26 October 1986, and was opened by the Queen. Preparation of the site involved the reclamation of land formerly occupied by the Shelton Bar steelworks (1830–1978), about two miles north-west of Stoke-on-Trent city centre, between Hanley and Burslem. British Steel's adjacent Shelton Bar steel rolling mill remained in use, finally closing in 2000.

== Reclaiming the site ==
One of the leading political forces behind the festival idea was Councillor Cyril Finney who also pushed through the vital dual carriageway linking the A500 road with the festival site.

The site reclamation cost £5 million, and the festival itself cost £18 million. The reclaimers of the festival site had to contend with highly contaminated and mine shafted land, and there is still debate among environmental professionals about how such a high-quality clean-up was accomplished in such a short time.

A community employment scheme ran alongside the work. Around 300,000 trees were planted by small teams, some groups comprising ex-steelworkers. Not knowing how trees should be planted, they were planted in, what seemed at the time, disarray. It later transpired that this method of planting resulted in a planted woodland that very closely matched natural-growth woodland, with trees of different types and ages growing alongside each other.

== Railway on site ==
A lengthy 2 ft (610 mm) gauge railway was built around the grounds with five stations. All the equipment was supplied by the firm of Severn Lamb. The railway had five stations located around the site with an engine shed, which was repurposed from a disused British Steel shed left over before the site was reclaimed, located at the north end of the site. The four identical locomotives were all powered by Perkins 4236 diesel engines with Linde hydraulic transmission driving the four wheels. A standard gauge track was laid at the main entrance and duties fell to Robert Heath No 6, 0-4-0 steam locomotive which originally was built in 1885 and now resides at the Foxfield Railway, Blythe Bridge, Staffordshire.

Upon closure the entire railway was sold to the Bygones Village museum in Fleggburgh, Norfolk. Two of the locos, some of the track and most of the carriages were resold to a safari park in Spain. The remaining two locos plus four carriages were retained for use at Fleggburgh. The locos received new steam-outline bodywork and the carriages were rebuilt with full doors and windows.

== Commemorative memorabilia ==
A set of commemorative stamps were issued nationally by the Post Office.

An extremely rare Dungeons & Dragons module, "Up the Garden Path", was based on the festival site; only about thirty copies are known to have survived. RPG adventurers travelled to the garden on a salamander-driven steam train run by gnomes.

== Festival Park: the site today ==
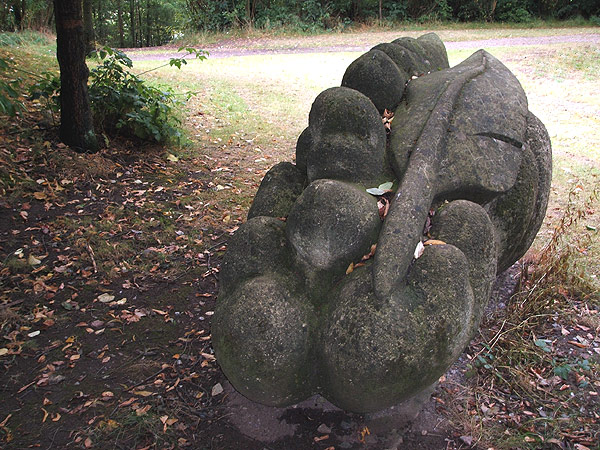
The Festival placed great emphasis on sculpture. Some works still remain on the site as of 2005, such as this sculpture, "Windborne (The Phoenix)" by Keir Smith.

The main retail site was completed in 1995, and is now known as Festival Park. It has been, for the most part, sympathetically treated by St. Modwen Properties which took on its management and development. Much of the parkland, pools and trails have been retained as public open space, and are maturing very well. Some of the gardens, such as the Moorlands Heather Rock Garden and The Rocky Valley, survive with their planting scheme relatively intact. Although most wooden structures have been left to return to nature, Festival Park is actively maintained by groundsmen. Some sculptures and a large Welsh slate water feature remain, as does the full-size stone circle.

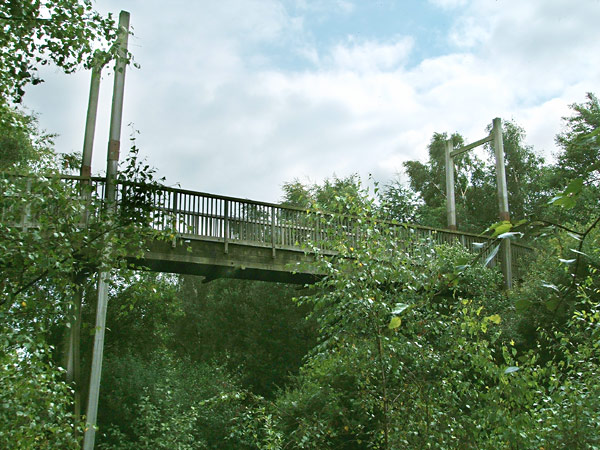
45-metre long suspension bridge of hardwood, spanning the Rocky Valley and joining the paths along the Woodland Ridge, 2005.

The huge wooden suspension bridge across a wooded ravine remains and can still be used. The complex network of paths is maze-like and, since there is no signage, very easy to get lost in. As of December 2017 the suspension bridge is closed off for repairs. It is currently being used by local wildlife photographers to capture photos of the Jay – a brightly coloured member of the crow family. The birds can be seen most days in winter.

2005 view from the middle of the suspension bridge, looking out over the eastern edge of the retained garden parkland. Beyond, the new out-of-town retail park merges into Stoke-on-Trent's city-centre.

There is now a large retail park on the eastern side of the site – on what was the festival's car-park and public market area – that now merges into the lower reaches of the city centre. There is also a large marina for narrowboats. Along the main road on the western edge of the site is the large Water World indoor swimming complex, a ski-slope, a ten-screen Odeon cinema, a ten-pin bowling alley, and a toboggan run. Festival Park's large four-star hotel incorporates Etruria Hall, former home of Josiah Wedgwood and Thomas Wedgwood. Next to Etruria Hall is the headquarters of the North Staffordshire Chamber of Commerce. Numerous similar low-rise offices nestle in the parkland and around the pools of Festival Park.

Groundwork UK created a £1 million cycle-path along the bordering Trent and Mersey Canal in 1998, which is now part of the National Cycle Network.

At the northern tip of the site the large complex of festival greenhouses was retained after the festival closed. For decades these operated as the city council's plant nursery. They have since been closed and the site is earmarked for a small geothermal power station – the feasibility of which is being tested via seismic tests and other investigations.

After the festival The Sentinel newspaper offices were also built on the far west of the site, and their large printing plant then served most newspapers in northern England. However, Sentinel Newspapers moved out of the site in 2012 and the site passed to online betting firm Bet365, which has built a major new purpose-built HQ there.

In April 2011 the far western part of the site – including the former steel rolling mill that closed in 2000 – was proposed as an enterprise zone by the local enterprise partnership, but the bid failed as it did not conform to government guidelines. The city council tried again a few years later, and the enterprise zone was confirmed. Plans are now underway for the implementation of the enterprise zone from 2017 onwards, with a focus on firms involved in innovative materials science and high-value design in ceramics.

As of May 2017 the West Midlands Ambulance Service has an ambulance hub based at Forge Lane. The hub provides emergency ambulance cover for all of North Staffordshire. The site was selected for its close proximity to the city centre and close road links to the A500.
