= Matthew Bell (footballer, born 1992) =

British Virgin Islands association football player (born 1992)

Personal information
- Date of birth: 3 January 1992 (age 34)
- Place of birth: Stoke-on-Trent, England
- Height: 1.80 m (5 ft 11 in)
- Position: Midfielder

Youth career
- Port Vale

Senior career*
Years	Team	Apps	(Gls)
2009–2011	Port Vale	0	(0)
2011–2012	Mansfield Town	1	(0)
2011–2012	→ Stafford Rangers (loan)		
2012	→ Solihull Moors (loan)	4	(0)
2012	→ Leek Town (loan)	12	(0)
2012–2015	Leek Town	103	(10)
2015	Kidsgrove Athletic		
2015–2019	Nantwich Town		
2019–2021	Leek Town	35	(7)
2021–2023	Nantwich Town	30	(0)
2023–2024	Hanley Town	17	(0)

International career
2015	British Virgin Islands	2	(0)
- * Club domestic league appearances and goals

Matthew Bell (born 3 January 1992) is a former footballer who played as a midfielder.

Bell came through the youth team at Port Vale and has played for Mansfield Town, Stafford Rangers, Leek Town, Solihull Moors, Kidsgrove Athletic, Nantwich Town and Hanley Town. He represented the British Virgin Islands at international level.

== Club career ==
Bell came through the youth team at Port Vale and turned professional with the League Two club under Micky Adams in April 2010. However, he failed to make a first-team appearance at Vale Park and was released in May 2011.

He signed a one-year contract with Conference National club Mansfield Town in June 2011. Manager Paul Cox stated that "He has a lovely left foot, is tenacious, has high fitness levels and can play at left-back, left-midfield and even in central midfield". He was loaned out to Northern Premier League side Stafford Rangers in December 2011 and Leek Town in March 2012.

He signed with Kidsgrove Athletic in February 2015. He joined Nantwich Town in May 2015. He helped the "Dabbers" to reach the semi-finals of the FA Trophy in 2015–16, scoring 12 goals in all competitions, and then to qualify for the Northern Premier League play-offs the following season, scoring eight goals from 51 appearances. This season also saw him collect the Players Player of the Year award for his performances. He lifted the Cheshire Senior Cup after scoring in a 3–0 win over Stockport Town in the 2018 final. He also played and scored in the 2019 final, a 5–2 victory over Cammell Laird 1907. He also helped the "Dabbers" to reach the 2018–19 play-offs, where they were beaten by Warrington Town in the semi-finals.

Bell re-joined Leek Town in October 2019, ending his Nantwich Town record with 31 goals from 199 competitive appearances. As a result of the COVID-19 pandemic in England, the 2019–20 Northern Premier League Division One South East season was formally abandoned on 26 March 2020, with all results from the season being expunged. He scored five goals from eleven games in the 2020–21 season, which was also curtailed early due to the pandemic on 24 February 2021. He made 13 appearances at the start of the 2021–22 season, scoring one goal, before he re-signed with Nantwich Town on 12 December. He played 18 times for Nantwich in the second half of the season. He joined Hanley Town in 2023. He made 23 appearances across the 2022–23 and 2023–24 campaigns.

== International career ==
Bell was called up to the British Virgin Islands squad and made his debut on 26 March 2015 in a 3–2 defeat to Dominica at Windsor Park in the first round of qualifying for the 2018 FIFA World Cup. He played in the reverse fixture three days later, a 0–0 draw which eliminated the British Virgin Islands from the competition.

== Career statistics ==
Appearances and goals by club, season and competition
Club	Season	League			FA Cup		League Cup		Other		Total	
Club	Season	Division	Apps	Goals	Apps	Goals	Apps	Goals	Apps	Goals	Apps	Goal
Port Vale	2009–10	League Two	0	0	0	0	0	0	0	0	0	0
Port Vale	2010–11	League Two	0	0	0	0	0	0	0	0	0	0
Port Vale	Total		0	0	0	0	0	0	0	0	0	0
Mansfield Town	2011–12	Conference National	1	0	0	0	—		0	0	1	0
Solihull Moors	2011–12	Conference North	4	0	0	0	—		0	0	4	0
Leek Town (loan)	2011–12	Northern Premier League Division One South	12	0	0	0	0	0	0	0	12	0
Leek Town	2012–13	Northern Premier League Division One South	39	2	3	0	2	0	3	0	47	2
Leek Town	2013–14	Northern Premier League Division One South	41	3	2	0	1	0	7	0	51	3
Leek Town	2014–15	Northern Premier League Division One South	23	5	5	1	1	0	5	2	34	8
Leek Town	Total		115	10	10	1	4	0	15	2	144	13
Nantwich Town	2017–18	Northern Premier League Premier Division	37	8					10	2	47	10
Nantwich Town	2018–19	Northern Premier League Premier Division	32	1					5	1	37	2
Leek Town	2019–20	Northern Premier League Division One South East	16	2	0	0	2	0	2	0	20	2
Leek Town	2020–21	Northern Premier League Division One South East	7	4	2	1	0	0	2	0	11	5
Leek Town	2021–22	Northern Premier League Division One West	12	1	1	0	0	0	0	0	13	1
Leek Town	Total		35	7	3	1	2	0	4	0	44	8
Nantwich Town	2021–22	Northern Premier League Premier Division	17	0	0	0	0	0	1	0	18	0
Nantwich Town	2022–23	Northern Premier League Premier Division	13	0	1	0	0	0	2	0	16	0
Nantwich Town	Total		30	0	1	0	0	0	3	0	34	0
Hanley Town	2022–23	Northern Premier League Division One West	9	0	0	0	0	0	0	0	9	0
Hanley Town	2023–24	Northern Premier League Division One West	8	0	3	0	0	0	3	0	14	0
Hanley Town	Total		17	0	3	0	0	0	3	0	23	0

== Honours ==
Nantwich Town

- Cheshire Senior Cup: 2018, 2019
