= Mo Chaudry =

British–Pakistani entrepreneur and investor

Mohammed Ishaq "Mo" Chaudry (born 21 September 1960) is a British–Pakistani entrepreneur and investor best known for owning and expanding Waterworld, Stoke-on-Trent from 1999 until its sale to the Looping Group in July 2025. He is chairman of M Investment Group and, since 2018, the majority shareholder and chair of Pulse Group. He has also appeared on Channel 4’s The Secret Millionaire and has been involved in regional sport, philanthropy and mentoring.

== Early life and education ==
Chaudry was born in Rawalpindi, Pakistan, and moved to England as a child, living first in Luton and later Telford, Shropshire. He attended New College, Telford, and studied sports science at Madeley College (then part of North Staffordshire Polytechnic). After graduating, he worked in financial services and property investment, building up a portfolio that made him a millionaire by age 30.

== Career ==
=== Property and finance ===
Chaudry began his career in financial services before moving into property investment.

=== Waterworld (1999–2025) ===
In 1999, Chaudry acquired the loss-making Waterworld aqua park from The Rank Group and invested in refurbishment and expansion. On 31 July 2025, Waterworld Leisure Limited and Waterworld Leisure Group Limited were sold to Looping Group; Companies House filings show Chaudry and family members resigned as directors the same day. Looping Group and trade press confirmed the deal was finalised in August 2025.

=== M Club and fitness ventures ===
In 2011 Chaudry acquired the former Esporta Health Club site at Festival Heights, Stoke-on-Trent, and relaunched it as M Club Spa & Fitness. In March 2018 he became majority shareholder and chair of the Congleton-based Pulse Group.

=== Media and sport ===
Chaudry appeared in The Secret Millionaire (Series 2, Episode 4), first broadcast on 5 December 2007, which followed him volunteering and donating to community groups in Leeds. He has been associated with strongman Eddie Hall, including acting as a mentor and manager during Hall’s career.

== Personal life ==
Chaudry lives in Staffordshire with his wife Ann and their three daughters.

Chaudry received honorary degrees from both Keele University and University of Staffordshire in 2008.

Chaudry has supported regional charitable initiatives and youth sport; he founded the M Club Foundation and has participated in fundraising challenges.
