= Waterworld, Stoke-on-Trent =

Waterpark in Stoke-on-Trent, England

Waterworld
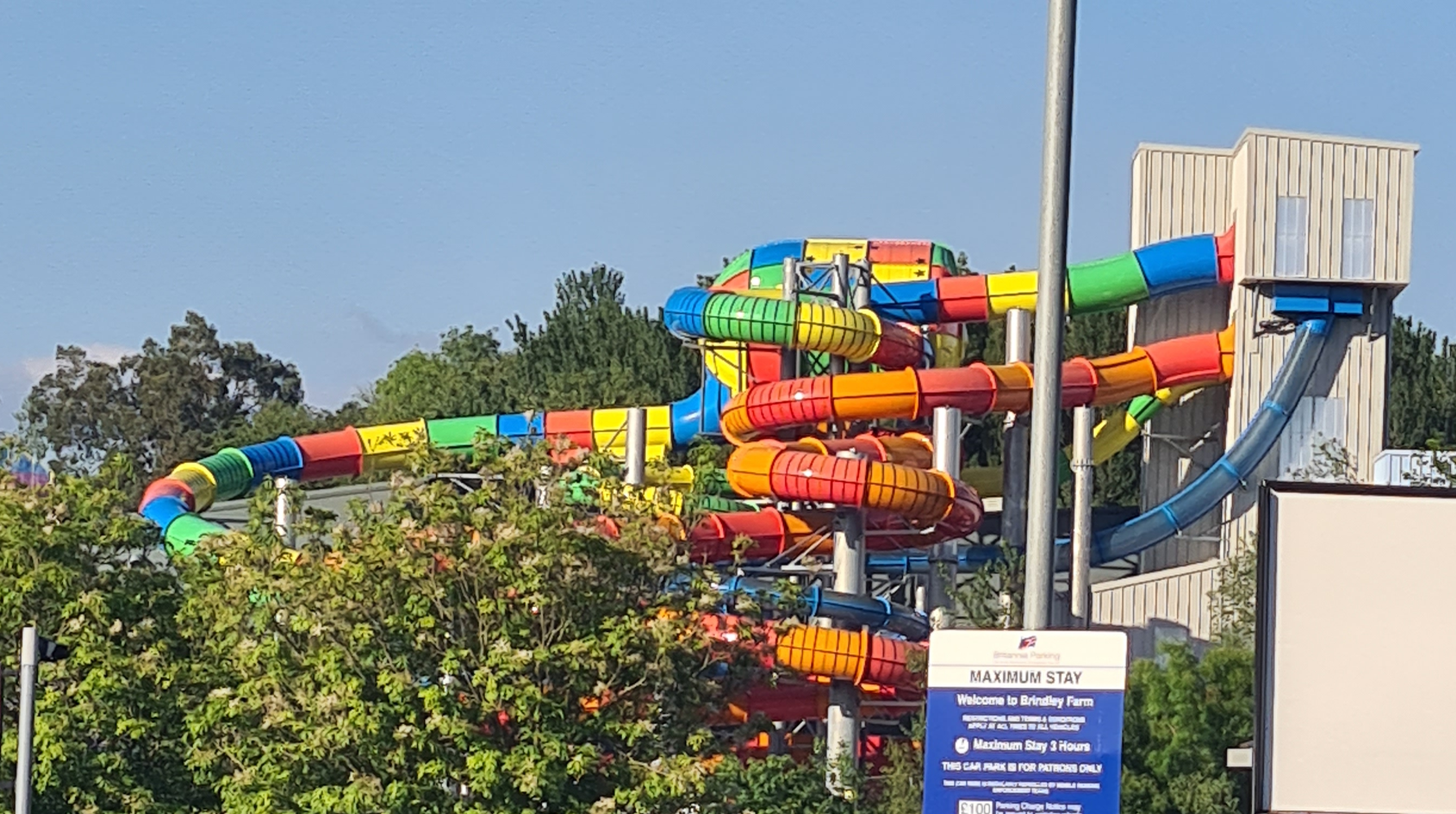
- Interactive map of Waterworld
- Location: Festival Park, Stoke-on-Trent, United Kingdom
- Coordinates: 53.0274°N 2.198°W
- Owner: Looping Experiences
- Opened: 1989
- Operating season: All year round (except outdoor pool)
- Pools: 3 pools
- Water slides: 20 water slides
- Website: http://www.waterworld.co.uk/

Waterworld is a water park located in Festival Park, Stoke-on-Trent, Staffordshire, England. The park attracts around 400,000 visitors per year. The park first opened in 1989 and is generally open year-round, but is closed for a few days of the week during term time.

== History ==
The park first opened in 1989 and was owned by Rank Leisure. In 1999, Mo Chaudry's family trust bought Water World for £1,500,000 (equivalent to £2,870,000 in 2025). The park had been operating at a loss but began turning profit under its new ownership.

The main slides are accessed from an elevated themed treehouse, including the Super Flume, Python, Black Hole, Space Bowl and Twister. In the early 2010s, a new glass fronted seating area was built at the front of the building beside the cafe. In 2019, the park expanded with four new slides: Stormchaser, Hurricane, Thunderbolt and Cyclone. The tallest rides in Tornado Alley also became the tallest water slides in England.

In July 2025, the park was sold to Looping Experiences.

== Rides ==
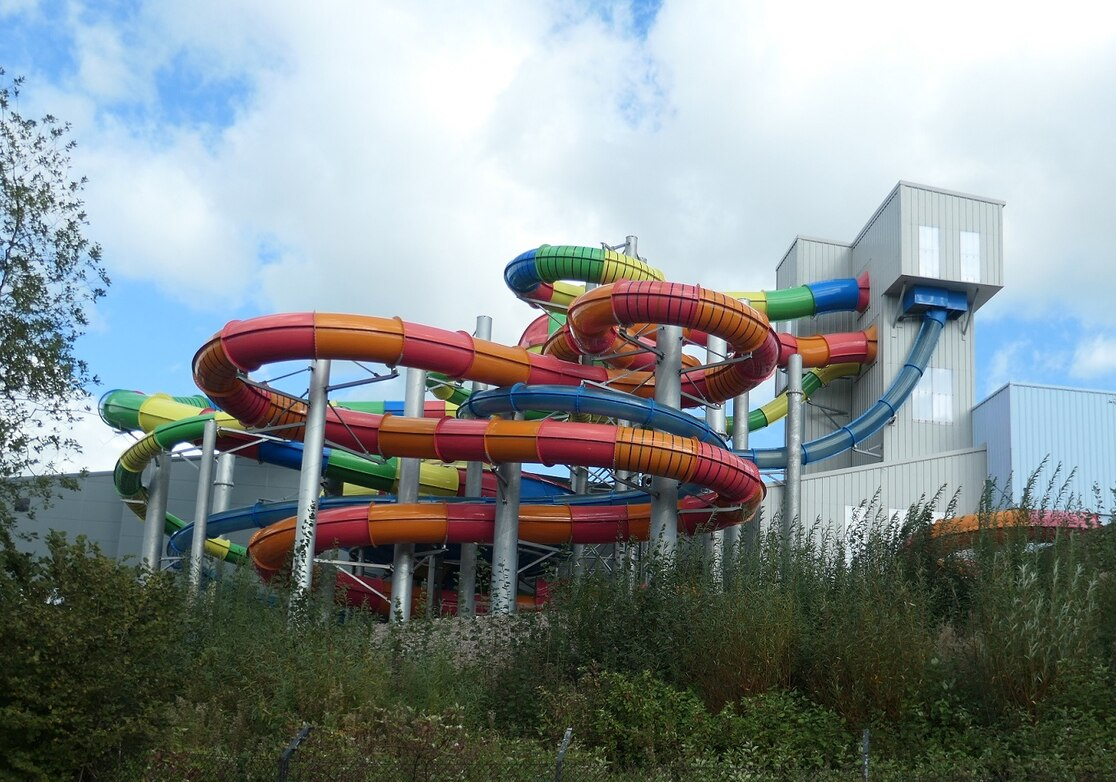
Water slides

The park's rides and attractions include: Thunderbolt, Cyclone, Hurricane, Stormchaser, Black Hole, The Nucleus, Space Bowl, Super Flume, Twister, Python, Rapids, Toddler Slides, Bubble Pools, Outdoor Pool (seasonal), Interactive Jungle House, The Lily pads, Racing Slides, and the Wave Pool.

=== Rapids ===
A small jet-powered indoor rapids flume. Formerly this space was also home to a circular bubble pool in the centre.

=== Treehouse slides ===
The treehouse stands in the centre of the water park and features 5 water slides. The 3 main body slides are the Super Flume, Python, and Black Hole. They each begin and end together but feature different layouts. The plunge pool depth is 1.2 metres.

The Space Bowl is a body slide that enters a bowl, themed as a UFO, which ends with a short, vertical drop into a 2 metre pool. It is limited to riders who are strong swimmers due to the deep pool.

The Twister is a high-speed body slide. From a raised platform, the flume takes a steep drop and curve at 25 mph (40 km/h), before ending in a water run-out. A skull at the entrance was removed in 2017. It was previously the tallest ride at the park until the opening of the Tornado Alley slides.

=== The Nucleus ===
The Nucleus is a jet-powered tube slide, which transports the rider through 91 m (300 ft) of ramps and drops. The minimum height is 1.1 metres (3 ft 7 in). Water jets boost the rider up a ramp, after which there is a drop into a second jet ramp and tunnel, before finally a steep drop into the water run-out.

=== Tornado Alley ===
Tornado Alley opened with a park expansion in 2019, coinciding with the park's 30th anniversary, and consists of four enclosed waterslides that travel outside the building:

- Thunderbolt is a trap-door body slide. It is the tallest and fastest waterslide in the UK, at a height of 18 m (59 ft) tall and maximum speed of 39 km/h (24 mph).
- Cyclone is a tube slide which begins in a dark flume with light effects, before entering a horizontal barrel where the rider swerves side-to-side. A second flume section then leads into a bowl, which the rider circles before exiting via the hole in the centre and plunging into the water run-out.
- Hurricane is a fast-paced body slide which begins with a steep drop into a series of twists and turns, with lighting effects as you slide.
- Stormchaser is a tube slide with a series of turns and a steady pace.
