= Carshalton Athletic F.C. =

Association football club in London, England

Coordinates: 51°22′11″N 0°10′19″W

Carshalton Athletic
- Full name: Carshalton Athletic Football Club
- Nickname: The Robins
- Founded: 1905; 121 years ago (as Mill Lane Mission)
- Ground: War Memorial Sports Ground, Carshalton
- Capacity: 5,000 (240 seated)
- Owner: Paul Dipre
- Manager: Steve Bates
- League: Isthmian League Premier Division
- 2025–26: Isthmian League Premier Division, 18th of 22
- Website: carshaltonathletic.co.uk
Home colours	Away colours

Carshalton Athletic Football Club is an English football club based in Carshalton in the London Borough of Sutton. They currently play in the Isthmian League Premier Division and are based at the War Memorial Sports Ground. The club also field a women's team playing in the London and South East Regional Women's Premier Division and have one of the biggest community clubs in England with over 40 junior teams.

== History ==
=== Early years ===
Carshalton Athletic traces its roots to two separate teams playing in the area of Wrythe Green in Carshalton in the early twentieth century. Whilst the club's history is dated to the formation of Mill Lane Mission in 1905 it also recognises the importance of officials, players and supporters of Carshalton St Andrews in its history.

Mill Lane Mission was organised by the Mill Lane Mission recreational facility for teenage boys and began playing friendlies in 1903. They were formally registered with the Surrey County FA in September 1905 and continued to play only friendly matches until 1906 when they joined the Croydon & District League Division 2A. During 1905 and 1906 discussions were held with Carshalton St Andrews over amalgamation.

Carshalton St Andrews was formed in 1897 by the vicar of St Andrews, Revd. C.W. Cleaver and began playing in the Surrey County Herald League. In 1902 they were promoted into the Southern Suburban League Division 2 West. They agreed to fold and amalgamate with Mill Lane Mission in 1906 but did not formally do so until they had honoured their remaining obligations at the end of the 1907–08 season.

Meanwhile, Mill Lane Mission registered their name change with the Surrey F.A. and began playing under the name Carshalton Athletic F.C. in 1907. The first ever match under this name was on 7 September 1907 at home on the Wrythe Green recreation ground in a friendly against Westbrook (Thornton Heath).

Carshalton Athletic's original colours were those inherited from St Andrews who played in Red with white stripes.

After the name change the club went on to win successive promotions in 1908, 1909 and 1910 which were rewarded with election to the Junior Division of the Southern Suburban League. During this time the club put out a reserve side and a midweek Carshalton Wednesday side (many different clubs set up these sides to play after the shops had shut 'early' on Wednesdays) and these two sides both performed well – the reserves winning the Croydon and District League Division 2A in 1909 and Carshalton Wednesday were runners up in the inaugural Surrey County Midweek Cup.

Before the outbreak of the First World War further success in both league and junior cup competitions was achieved. In 1913 the club won the Suburban League Division 1 West and the following season added the Suburban League Division 1 East title to this. In the same period they also won the Surrey Junior Cup, Surrey Junior Charity Cup and the Croydon Charity Cup and were runners up in the London Junior Cup. The outbreak of the war curtailed this period of success and the club went into a period of suspended animation during the war as its home ground was given over to agricultural use.

Following the reformation of the club on 31 March 1919, and after playing on a number of different grounds, Carshalton Athletic finally moved into their new (and current) home in Colston Avenue during the 1920–21 season. This was built as a memorial to those members of the club who died in the War.

The interwar years were otherwise relatively uneventful. The only silverware the club won was the Surrey Intermediate Cup, in 1922 and 1932. In the league, the club remained in the Southern Suburban League, finishing as runners up in 1922 before becoming founding members of the Surrey Senior League in the 1922–23 season. At the same time the club gained Football Association senior club status and this allowed Carshalton Athletic to enter FA national competitions and county senior cups for the first time.

=== Post-war and the Corinthian League ===
With the upheavals of the Second World War in Europe over, preparations for the resumption in football at Colston Avenue began 1945 with applications made to join the London League (senior side) Surrey Intermediate League (reserve side) and to enter the London Senior and Surrey Senior cups.

The club did not apply to enter the FA Challenge Cup or FA Amateur Cup because facilities at the ground were not up to standard for these competitions. The club did make it a priority to improve the standard of the ground and facilities to make them suitable for the higher reaches of the amateur game. The work on the ground proved to be needed the following season as Carshalton Athletic were elected into the Corinthian League, which had been set up in the previous year, for the 1946–47 season.

Several years of indifferent league form followed with only minor highlights in cup competitions, although the club continued to grow as evidenced by a record attendance of over 8000 for an FA Challenge Cup 3rd round qualifying tie against local rivals Tooting and Mitcham United. Behind the scenes the club was taking steps to improve the club's chances on the pitch including hiring a coach for all sides for the first time but the club committee ensured that they retained the final say in selection decisions.

A far better period began with the first match Carshalton Athletic played against a team from overseas at the start of the 1952–53 season. Hengelo from the Netherlands were the opponents in what was to become a regular friendly fixture over following years. Carshalton went on to win the Corinthian League title by 3 points from Hounslow Town at the end of the season and the reserve team finished second in their league, 2 points behind Uxbridge.

The 1953–54 season brought further success as Carshalton Athletic retain the league title, finishing 2 points ahead of Edgware Town, although cup success was still proving elusive. This was rectified somewhat in the 1954–55 season as the club reached the final of the Surrey Senior Shield and the quarter-finals of the FA Amateur Cup for the first time in their history (this was also the first year in which two Corinthian League teams reached the quarter-finals). The 1955–56 season was unremarkable on the pitch but did see further advances around the ground as Carshalton Athletic's success of recent season was reflected in the size of the supporters club with over 2000 members. It was also the club's last appearance in the Corinthian League as the summer of 1956 saw election to the Athenian League.

=== Athenian League ===
For the next 17 years the club competed in the Athenian League with little success and finishing at the bottom of the table twice (1959–60 and 1960–61 seasons). Their best performance came in the 1963–64 season when the club finished the season in third place. Around the ground floodlights were finally erected on six pylons in 1967.

Limited cup success was achieved. A first appearance in the Surrey Senior Cup final came in the 1957–58 season, although Dulwich Hamlet won the final 1–0 and it would be another 31 years before Carshalton Athletic appeared in the final again. There was also success in the FA Amateur Cup as the club reached the quarter-finals for the second time in 1959–60. In the same season the club won the Southern Combination Cup for the first time, after losing in the final the previous season.

=== Isthmian League 1973–2004 ===
In the summer of 1973 Carshalton Athletic were elected as founder members of the newly created Isthmian League Division 2. The first two seasons proved to be a struggle and in their third they just missed out on promotion finishing third in the league. Three years of struggle paid off in the 1976–77 season when promotion to the Isthmian Premier Division after finishing as runners up in the league in a year in which they also won the Surrey Senior Shield.

After promotion in the league the club entered another period of struggling, not finishing in the top half until the 1987–88 season. This coincided with the start of years of upheaval in the organisation of the ownership and running of the club both on and off the field. The club reached the second round proper of the FA Challenge Cup for the first time before losing 4–1 to Fourth Division Torquay United. Over this period Carshalton Athletic had 8 different managers and it was only the final appointment of Billy Smith in August 1986 that began to turn the club's fortunes around.

The first Billy Smith era lasted for nearly 9 years and was the most successful period in the club's history. During his time in charge of the club twice reaching the 1st round Proper of the FA Challenge Cup, winning the Surrey Senior Cup three times in four years and reaching the final 5 times in 7 years, recording its highest ever placing in the league at the end of the 1988–89 season and winning the London Challenge Cup in 1991. This period came to an end when Smith left to take charge of Kingstonian, and was followed by a rapid turnover of managers.

Under John Rains, the club reached the third round of the FA Trophy. Chris Kilby led them to the first round proper of the 1997–98 FA Cup, in which they lost to Stevenage Borough after a replay, and former player Gary Bowyer twice led a successful fight against relegation. In 2000, with the club in severe financial difficulties, the ownership changed hands twice, Bowyer was dismissed, the clubhouse was destroyed in an arson attack, and the ground's landlords, Sutton Council, threatened the club with eviction for breaching their lease. At the end of that season, Carshalton were relegated to Division One. Two years later, Graham Roberts led them to the Division One South title, to gain promotion to the Premier Division. The following season, they finished seventh, thus qualifying for the new Conference South.

=== Conference South ===
After a £12 million plan to rebuild the ground fell through, chairman Steve Friend resigned, followed by manager Billy Smith. Under Jimmy Bolton, Carshalton retained their place in the Conference South in 2004–05, but in 2005–06, the club's centenary season, they were relegated back to the Isthmian League.

=== Isthmian League 2006–present ===
Carshalton finished mid table in 2006–07 but the following season 2007–08 saw disappointing early results and as a result the manager Dave Garland left the club in October 2007. First team coach Hayden Bird was then appointed to take the helm.

Hayden signed and introduced named players into the club and focused on playing possession football. With just 7 games to go the club was purchased by Paul Dipre who injected sufficient funds to strengthen the squad in an effort to avoid relegation. Carshalton's home win over Tonbridge Angels was enough to secure their status.

The season 2008–09 was the first full season under new ownership. The reserves and junior sections were axed in favour of a new academy and junior section, buildings and facilities were upgraded, staff and personnel were changed and at the end of this season the club also changed its badge and its playing colours from maroon, to red. On the pitch, aided with 31 goals from Richard Jolly, The Robins finished in 4th place, setting up a play-off semi-final with Tonbridge Angels. Athletic claimed a 3–2 win to meet Staines Town in the final. Held at Staines's Wheatsheaf Park Ground, Carshalton more than held their own against Staines, who had finished 2nd in the regular season. Sadly for The Robins, an 85th-minute penalty was saved by Staines 'keeper Louis Wells, and Scott Taylor scored an extra-time winner for Staines.

On 1 September 2009, manager Hayden Bird resigned as the club's first team manager; Ian Hazel was placed in caretaker charge. On 10 September the club announced the appointment of former Carshalton player Francis Vines as Bird's permanent replacement.

Shortly before the 2010–11 season Mark Butler was placed in charge of the club. After a promising first half of the season, Butler's results went from bad to worse until he was sacked and the owner Paul Dipre took the reins. The team finished 13th.

The 2011–12 season was a rollercoaster for the first team. Dipre was tipped to win the league in his first season, but a rocky league performance ended in a lowly 16th position. Despite the poor league form there was much to celebrate in the FA Trophy with one of the most historic results in the club's history when they beat Lincoln City 3–1 at Colston Avenue, Paul Vines scoring a hat-trick. Dipre's squad also reach the semi-finals of the Surrey Senior Cup for the first time in 20 years.

2011–12 was a mixed year for the club overall. Carshalton Athletic were awarded the Community Club of the year award and became one of the largest community clubs in the UK with over 40 junior/youth teams including 7 girls/ladies teams. The club also built on its financial base by growing turnover to £430,000 – a 300% increase over three years. Dipre made a gift of shares to some of the supporters.

In 2012–13 Dipre removed himself from the manager's position after only one win in the club's opening six league games. Coach Tommy Williams, also a former player of the club, took the reins and officially took the job in October 2012.

Carshalton Athletic was bestowed with three community club awards throughout 2012 – the South East Regional Community Club of the Year, the Surrey FA Community Club of the Year and the FA National Community Club of the Year, the latter awarded to chairman Frank Williams and youth development officer Paul Williams by ex-professional footballers Chris Kamara and Martin Keown, plus TV presenter Ben Shepherd.

Carshalton finished 21st in the 2012–13 Isthmian League Premier Division, which ordinarily would have seen them relegated. However, a points deduction and consequent relegation for Thurrock gave them a reprieve, keeping them in the Isthmian Premier for the 2013–2014 Season. Despite the reprieve, the Club finished 23rd in the 2013–14 Isthmian League Premier Division and were relegated. After several seasons in Isthmian League South, Under Player-Manager Peter Adeniyi, the club finally won promotion in style. Sealing the 2017–18 Isthmian League South Division title with a 7–0 win on the final day of the season; ending the season with 102 Points In the club's first season back in the Premier Division 2018–19 Isthmian League they finished runners-up and qualified for the playoffs; losing to Merstham 2–1 in the semi-finals.

The club were in the play off places, 5th and then subsequently 4th, when the COVID-19 pandemic halted both the Isthmian League 2019–20 season and 2020–21 season.

For the 2022–23 Isthmian League season the club decided to appoint Steve McKimm as Manager but after finishing 11th, he was subsequently released

Peter Adeniyi then returned to the club ready for the 2023–24 Isthmian League season where the club finished 11th position

In the 2024–25 Isthmian League season the Robins remained firmly in contention for a play-off spot but ultimately finished just outside the top six, securing 7th place. They also enjoyed notable cup runs, reaching the 4th Qualifying Round of the FA Cup against Boreham Wood and progressing to the semi-finals of the Surrey Senior Cup, where they were defeated by Dorking Wanderers.

On 19 February 2026, Peter Adeniyi resigned from his post and Steven Bates was confirmed as his replacement. Bates strengthen the squad in an effort to avoid relegation which they achieved by winning their final game of the 2025–26 Isthmian League season

== Rivals ==
Carshalton Athletic's main rivals include Sutton United, AFC Wimbledon, Kingstonian, and Tooting & Mitcham.

Carshalton have a strong rivalry with their nearest neighbours Sutton United as they are both based in the London Borough of Sutton. Throughout the two clubs' histories the 'Derby' matches have been contested in both the Isthmian League and the Conference South, and always draw crowds in their Thousands

== Stadium ==
Carshalton Athletic play their home games at the War Memorial Sports Ground located at Colston Ave, Carshalton, Sutton.

From the formation of Mill Lane Mission until 1906 the club played on a pitch hired in Carshalton Park moving to a pitch in the Wrythe Recreation Ground (and using the Cricketers pub opposite as a 'clubhouse') when they joined the Croydon & District League. Here they remained until the outbreak of war in 1914. During the war many open spaces and parks were used for agricultural purposes which meant that when football finally resumed in 1919 the old pitch needed to be levelled and resown with grass and so was unavailable for use. A temporary ground was loaned to the club by a market gardener named G. Mizen, in what was known as Culvers Park (now covered by housing as Culvers Avenue) and it was here that the club resumed playing in the Southern Suburban League.

Knowing that the Culvers Park ground could only ever be a temporary measure, the Secretary and committee of the club continued to investigate alternative arrangements. Eventually a local area of land, known as Shorts Farm, was discovered to be for sale. Whilst the club certainly did not have the funds to purchase all 37 acres (150,000 m^{2}) of land, it was hoped that they could negotiate a separate sale of 4 acres (16,000 m^{2}) to be set aside as a War Memorial and dedicated to sports. After several convoluted sales and purchases the local District Council acquired the land and the club were able to lease the land they needed and to build the facilities they desired on the land. The opening match on the ground took place on 1 January 1921 against Thornville in the Sutton Hospital Charity Cup.

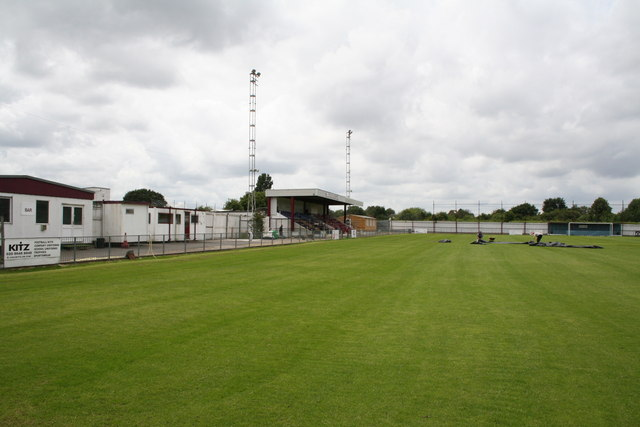
Colston Avenue photographed in 2007

Gradually improvements were made to the ground. In 1926 a grandstand was acquired from Epsom Downs Racecourse, dismantled, moved and rebuilt on the ground to provide much needed seating. This survived until it was finally blown down by gales in March 1968. Slowly each side was converted from grass banking to terracing (this work finally being completed in 1991) and various offices, dressing rooms, coverings for terraces and a clubhouse and function room were added to the site. Floodlights were added in 1967 and a new grandstand was built in 1972 and extended in 1996. A great many of these structures were destroyed in an arson attack in 2000 which gutted the clubhouse, a new 'temporary' clubhouse has been in place since 2000.

In August 2003 the club submitted plans for a £12 million rebuild of the current stadium to include additional community facilities. The intention was to increase the level of usage of the site to allow the club to become self-financing. Local residents objected to the proposed increase in use and in light of the number of local residents opposed to the expansion the club withdrew their application for planning permission. In 2015, Carshalton Athletic replaced their grass pitch with an artificial, 3G pitch, after winning planning permission beforehand.

In 2018, Carshalton Athletic hosted a number of games in the 2018 CONIFA World Football Cup.

== Carshalton Athletic Ladies ==
Carshalton Athletic Ladies was formed in 2011 and has since expanded to now include a reserve team, plus several girls' teams ranging from under 10s to under 16s. The long-term aims include bringing players through the Girls set-up into the Ladies section, utilising the Carshalton Athletic FC Girls Football Academy in place at Stanley Park High School, Carshalton.

The Ladies' first team play their home matches at Colston Avenue sharing the same pitch as the men's first team. They are managed by Harrison Williams, with Paul Williams and Joanna Goodwin, appointed Assistant Manager and Coach respectively for the 2017–18 season.

The First Team play in the London and South East Regional Women's League, Premier Division. Recent triumphs include the First Team winning the John Greenacre Memorial Trophy in the 2012–13 season, having won the Ladies' first trophy within two-years of its existence. In the same season the First Team finished runners-up in the London and South East Regional Women's League, Division One (London).

== Carshalton Athletic Pan Disability squad ==
Carshalton Athletic Pan Disability Squad was formed as a joint venture between the club and the Surrey FA in 2013. Free 1hr coaching sessions were held in Brookfield park by Lee Atkinson (the club's Development & Disability coach) for a 10-week period offering football to Adults (16+) with Learning Disabilities. The number of attendees grew each week and at the end of the 10-week period training continued with what was now a 'squad' of players. The squad currently has 18 players fielding 2 teams that both play in the Surrey Football For All Premier League with teams such as Chelsea, Fulham and Hampton & Richmond.

Two players have trialled for the England u19s LD Squad and, one went on to play at the Chelsea Cerebral Palsy CoE.

The team have experienced both league and cup success coming 3rd in the Premier League in their first season despite entering halfway through the season. And, then winning the Premier League in both the 2014–15 and 2015–16 seasons. Their cup success saw them make it to the semi-final of the Ryman Disability Cup and won a 3rd-place winners medal in the Regional Disability Cup both in the 2014–15 season.

== Players ==
=== Current squad ===
As of November 2026

Note: Flags indicate national team as defined under FIFA eligibility rules; some limited exceptions apply. Players may hold more than one non-FIFA nationality.

No.	Pos.	Nation	Player
—	GK		Ben Dudzinski
—	DF		Denzel Akyeampong
—	DF		Ethan Kaiser
—	DF		Oluwafikayo Atewologun
—	DF		Robert Howard
—	DF		Hani Hechachena
—	DF		Renedi Masampu
—	DF		Matt Yates
—	DF		Prince Kandolo
—	MF		Nico Jones

No.	Pos.	Nation	Player
—	MF		Fabio Saraiva
—	MF		Chris Regis
—	MF		Tyler Hayles
—	MF		Jacob Safa
—	MF		Jermaine Anderson
—	FW		Nathan Young-Coombes
—	FW		Tope Fadahunsi
—	FW		Ada Okorogheye

== Club records since 1945 ==
- Club Record Attendance: 7,800 v Wimbledon – London Senior Cup – Jan 1959 won 2–1
- Career goalscorer: Jimmy Bolton – 242 goals in 7 seasons
- Highest transfer fee paid: £5,000 Junior Haynes from Sutton United in 1998
- Highest transfer fee received: £40,000 for Ian Cox from Crystal Palace in 1994
- Record Win: 13–0 v Worthing – Loctite Cup 3rd rd – Feb 1991
- Record defeat: 11–0 v Southall – Athenian Premier – April 1963
- Best FA Cup performance: 2nd round, 1982-83
- Best FA Trophy performance: 3rd round, 1980–81, 1995-96, 2001-02, 2011-12, 2018-19

== Club honours ==
- Isthmian League
  - South Division winners 2017-2018
  - Division One winners 2002–03
- Corinthian League
  - Champions (2) 1952–53, 1953–54
- London Challenge Cup
  - Winners 1990–91
- Surrey Senior Cup
  - Winners (3) 1988–89, 1989–90, 1991–92
  - Runners-Up (5): 1957–58, 1992–93, 1994–95, 1996–97, 1998–99
- Surrey Senior Shield
  - Winners 1976–77
  - Runners up 1954–55
- Southern Combination Cup
  - Winners 1959–60
- Surrey Intermediate Cup:
  - Winners (2): 1921–22, 1931–32
- Alan Turvey Trophy
  - Runners-up (1): 1990–91
- Surrey Junior Cup:
  - Runners-up (1): 1919–20
- Surrey Lower Junior Cup:
  - Runners up (3): 1910–11, 1937–38, 1938–39
