= Dan Turner (footballer) =

English footballer (born 1998)

Personal information
- Full name: Daniel Graham Turner
- Date of birth: 23 June 1998 (age 28)
- Place of birth: Stone, Staffordshire, England
- Height: 5 ft 11 in (1.80 m)
- Position: Forward

Team information
- Current team: Hednesford Town

Youth career
- 2006–2016: Port Vale

Senior career*
Years	Team	Apps	(Gls)
2016–2019	Port Vale	34	(3)
2016	→ Kidsgrove Athletic (loan)	4	(5)
2017	→ Worcester City (loan)	1	(0)
2018	→ Tamworth (loan)	3	(0)
2018	→ Falkirk (loan)	0	(0)
2019–2020	Hyde United	22	(7)
2020	Matlock Town	1	(0)
2020–2021	Hednesford Town	12	(5)
2021–2023	Leamington	75	(26)
2023–2024	Brackley Town	30	(5)
2024–2025	Chester	16	(0)
2024–2025	→ Leamington (loan)	12	(4)
2025–	Hednesford Town	26	(2)
- * Club domestic league appearances and goals as of 19:16, 1 May 2026 (UTC)

Daniel Graham Turner (born 23 June 1998) is an English semi-professional footballer who plays as a forward for National League North club Hednesford Town.

Turner turned professional at Port Vale in April 2016 and played on loan at Kidsgrove Athletic and Worcester City during the 2016–17 season. He joined Tamworth on loan in January 2018. He joined Scottish Championship club Falkirk on a six-month loan at the start of the 2018–19 season, later cut short three months early. He was released by Port Vale and joined Hyde United in August 2019 before moving on to Matlock Town in March 2020. He switched to Hednesford Town in June 2020 and signed with Leamington in January 2021. He won the Birmingham Senior Cup with Leamington in 2022. He was sold to Brackley Town in June 2023 and moved to Chester 12 months later. He returned to Leamington on loan in December 2024. He rejoined Hednesford Town in June 2025.

== Career ==
=== Port Vale ===
Turner began his career as a youth team scholar at Port Vale, and played for the youth team in the 2014 Staffordshire Senior Cup final defeat to Rushall Olympic. He made his debut in the English Football League on 23 April 2016, coming on for Theo Robinson as a late substitute in a 4–1 victory over Rochdale at Vale Park. He signed his first professional contract at the end of the 2015–16 season.

On 9 September 2016, he joined Northern Premier League Division One South club Kidsgrove Athletic on a one-month loan. The following day, he scored two goals on his debut for the "Grove" in a 5–0 home win over Chasetown. He scored another two goals in his next league appearance, a 4–3 home defeat to Bedworth United. On 16 January 2017, he joined National League North side Worcester City on a one-month loan, and made his debut later that night in a 1–1 draw at Curzon Ashton. He returned to Vale to become a regular substitute towards the end of the 2016–17 season under caretaker manager Michael Brown. He came close to scoring his first Football League goal against Oxford United on 17 April, but his headed goal was ruled out for offside. He started his first league game five days later, but was forced to spend much of the game up front on his own after strike partner Rigino Cicilia was sent off.

He signed a new one-year contract in May 2017, with the club preparing to start the 2017–18 campaign in EFL League Two following relegation at the end of the previous season. He scored his first goal for the "Valiants" with a header in a 3–1 win at Crawley Town on 5 August. Having failed to establish himself in new manager Neil Aspin's first-team plans, he joined Tamworth of the National League North one a one-month loan deal on 17 January 2018. He arrived at The Lamb Ground in what was an unstable time for the "Lambs", with manager Andy Morrell losing his job due to poor results, and Turner ended up playing just three games for the club.

Turner was loaned to Scottish Championship club Falkirk in June 2018 in a deal to run for the first six months of the 2018–19 season. He missed the start of the league campaign due to a hamstring injury, though the "Bairns" had sacked manager Paul Hartley and replaced him with Ray McKinnon after suffering defeat in their opening three league matches. The loan deal was terminated on 5 October and the terms of the loan meant that he was unable to play for anyone until January. Vale manager John Askey confirmed that he would not be offering Turner a new contract on 16 May.

=== Non-League ===
Turner spent time with the Stoke under-23s, Macclesfield Town and Curzon Ashton before he joined Northern Premier League Premier Division club Hyde United on non-contract terms in August 2019. He scored nine goals in 28 games for the "Tigers", including braces against Ashton United and Basford United. On 12 March 2020, he left Ewen Fields and joined league rivals Matlock Town. However, he was only able to make one appearance for the "Gladiators" as the 2019–20 season was formally abandoned due to the COVID-19 pandemic in England just two weeks later.

On 27 June 2020, Turner signed with Southern League Premier Division Central side Hednesford Town, who were managed by former Tamworth boss Andy Morrell. He scored five goals in 12 games for the "Pitmen" before the 2020–21 season was paused due to the ongoing pandemic. He left Hednesford to sign with Leamington of the National League North on 12 January 2021. He scored a penalty on his debut later that day in a 2–1 victory at Chorley. However, the 2020–21 National League season was soon brought to a premature end due to the ongoing pandemic. He scored 12 goals in 38 league games in the 2021–22 campaign. He also scored in the final of the Birmingham Senior Cup as the "Brakes" won the trophy with a 3–1 win over Stourbridge at Villa Park. He scored 13 goals in 36 league games in the 2022–23 season as Leamington were relegated in 22nd-place.

In June 2023, Turner returned to the National League North following Leamington's relegation when he signed for Brackley Town for an undisclosed fee. He scored five goals in 30 league games in the 2023–24 season and was an unused substitute in the play-off final defeat to Boston United.

On 12 June 2024, Turner signed a one-year contract with National League North club Chester. In December 2024, he returned to Leamington on an initial one-month loan, later extended until the end of the season. He scored four goals and made two assists in twelve games before being recalled to Chester on 23 February following an injury to Dylan Mottley-Henry.

On 6 June 2025, he rejoined Hednesford Town of the Northern Premier League Premier Division, with manager Gavin Hurren remarking he expected him to be a "fan favourite".

== Career statistics ==
As of match played 14 February 2026

Appearances and goals by club, season and competition
Club	Season	League			FA Cup		League cup		Other		Total	
Club	Season	Division	Apps	Goals	Apps	Goals	Apps	Goals	Apps	Goals	Apps	Goals
Port Vale	2015–16	League One	1	0	0	0	0	0	0	0	1	0
Port Vale	2016–17	EFL League One	16	0	0	0	0	0	2 (Note: Appearance(s) in the EFL Trophy)	0	18	0
Port Vale	2017–18	EFL League Two	17	3	1	0	1	0	4	0	23	3
Port Vale	2018–19	EFL League Two	0	0	0	0	0	0	0	0	0	0
Port Vale	Total		34	3	1	0	1	0	6	0	42	3
Kidsgrove Athletic (loan)	2016–17	Northern Premier League; Division One South	4	5	1	0	0	0	0	0	5	5
Worcester City (loan)	2016–17	National League North	1	0	0	0	—		0	0	1	0
Tamworth (loan)	2017–18	National League North	3	0	0	0	—		0	0	3	0
Falkirk (loan)	2018–19	Scottish Championship	0	0	0	0	4	0	0	0	4	0
Hyde United	2019–20	Northern Premier League; Premier Division	22	7	1	0	1	0	4 (Note: 2 appearances and 1 goal in the Manchester Premier Cup, 1 appearance and 1 goal in the Cheshire Senior Cup, and 1 appearance in the FA Trophy)	2	28	9
Matlock Town	2019–20	Northern Premier League; Premier Division	1	0	0	0	0	0	0	0	1	0
Hednesford Town	2020–21	Southern League; Premier Division Central	12	5	0	0	0	0	0	0	12	5
Leamington	2020–21	National League North	1	1	0	0	—		0	0	1	1
Leamington	2021–22	National League North	38	12	0	0	—		1 (Note: Appearance(s) in the FA Trophy)	0	39	12
Leamington	2022–23	National League North	36	13	0	0	—		2	0	38	13
Leamington	Total		75	26	0	0	0	0	3	0	78	26
Brackley Town	2023–24	National League North	30	5	0	0	—		2	0	32	5
Chester	2024–25	National League North	16	0	0	0	—		1	0	17	0
Leamington (loan)	2024–25	National League North	12	4	0	0	—		0	0	12	4
Hednesford Town	2025–26	Northern Premier League; Premier Division	26	2	4	1	0	0	1	0	31	3
Hednesford Town	2026–27	National League North	0	0	0	0	—		0	0	0	0
Hednesford Town	Total		26	2	4	1	0	0	1	0	31	3
Career total			236	57	7	1	6	0	17	2	266	60

== Honours ==
Leamington

- Birmingham Senior Cup: 2022
