= 2017–18 Port Vale F.C. season =

Port Vale F.C.
2017–18 season
- Owner: Norman Smurthwaite
- Chairman: Tony Fradley
- Manager: Michael Brown (until 16 September); David Kelly & Chris Morgan (caretakers from 16 September to 4 October); Neil Aspin (from 4 October)
- Stadium: Vale Park
- EFL League Two: 20th (47 points)
- FA Cup: Second Round (eliminated by Yeovil Town)
- EFL Cup: First Round (eliminated by Leeds United)
- EFL Trophy: Second Round (eliminated by Shrewsbury Town)
- Player of the Year: Tom Pope
- Top goalscorer: League: Tom Pope (17); All: Tom Pope (19)
- Highest home attendance: 7,127 vs. Coventry City, 26 December 2017
- Lowest home attendance: 824 vs. Newcastle United Academy, 3 October 2017
- Average home league attendance: 4,583
- Biggest win: 4–0 vs. Luton Town, 30 December 2017
- Biggest defeat: 5–0 vs. Cambridge United, 5 May 2018
Home colours	Away colours

The 2017–18 season was Port Vale's 106th season of football in the English Football League, and first season back in EFL League Two following relegation from EFL League One.

The season began as Michael Brown's first full season as manager, and he targeted promotion as he built a new squad in the summer. The rebuilding process required a massive clear out of 21 players, and in their place, he signed 13 permanent players and seven loan players, including former two-time Player of the Year Tom Pope. After winning on the opening day, Vale then went a club record six successive games in all competitions without scoring a goal, losing straight league games to go bottom of the league in September. This run ended with a 1–1 draw at home to Forest Green Rovers on 16 September, which was Brown's last match in charge. His replacement was former defender Neil Aspin, who was joined by former manager John Rudge in a director of football role. They oversaw an upturn in results, though the club exited the FA Cup following a replay in the second round; Aspin bemoaned refereeing decisions that saw Vale reduced to nine men, though they managed to take Yeovil Town into extra time despite twice going behind with two fewer players.

Aspin signed three players and four loanees in the January transfer window, the most significant addition being that of Luke Hannant; meanwhile, three players and four loanees left the club, the biggest loss being Gavin Gunning, who went to relegation rivals Forest Green Rovers. Vale went 14 games without a win at the start of 2018. Still, victory over Chesterfield on Good Friday eased genuine concerns of relegation into the National League. Nevertheless, a run of just two wins in their 21 games in 2018 meant they finished in 20th place, the joint-lowest finish in the club's history. They largely relied on Player of the Year Tom Pope's 19 goals to stay in the league.

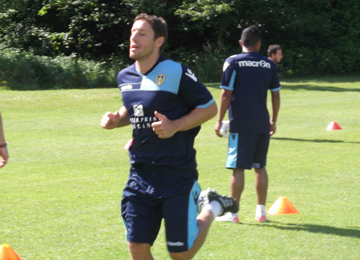
Manager Michael Brown departed in September.

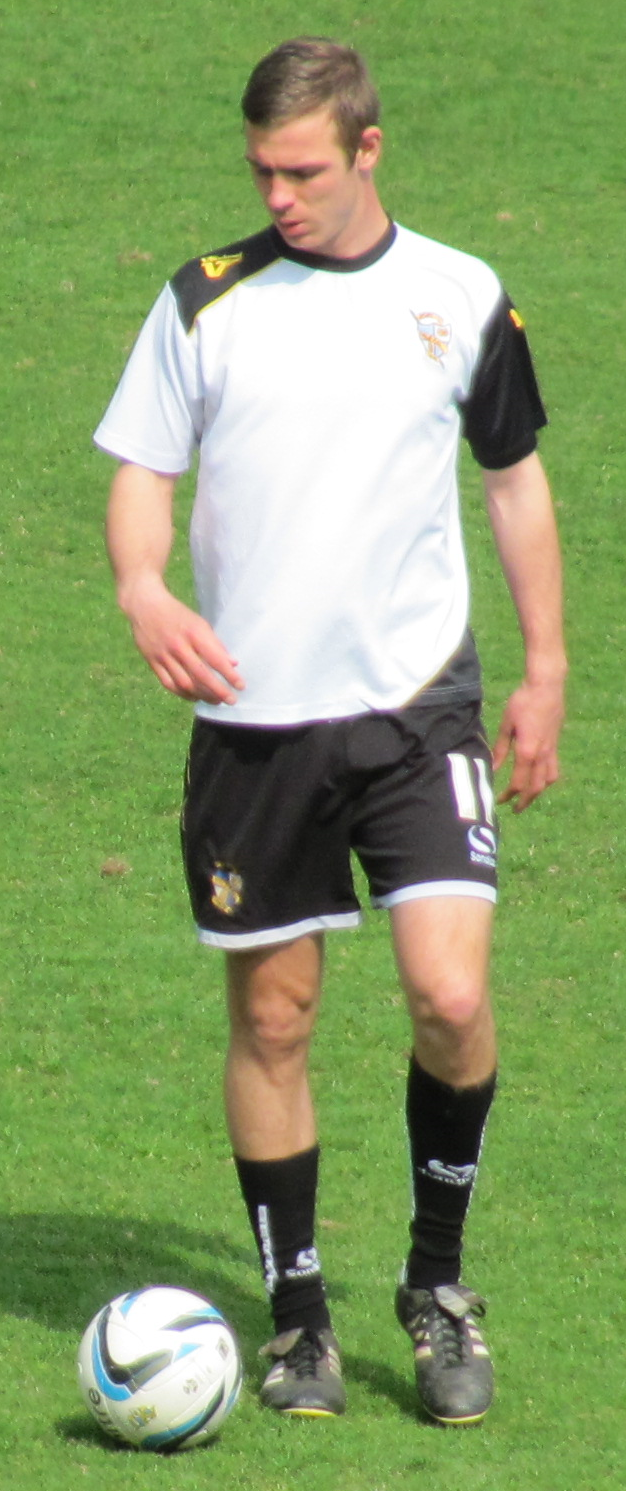
Tom Pope finished as top-scorer with 19 goals.

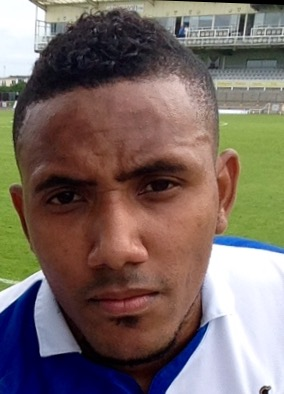
Cristian Montaño contributed six goals.

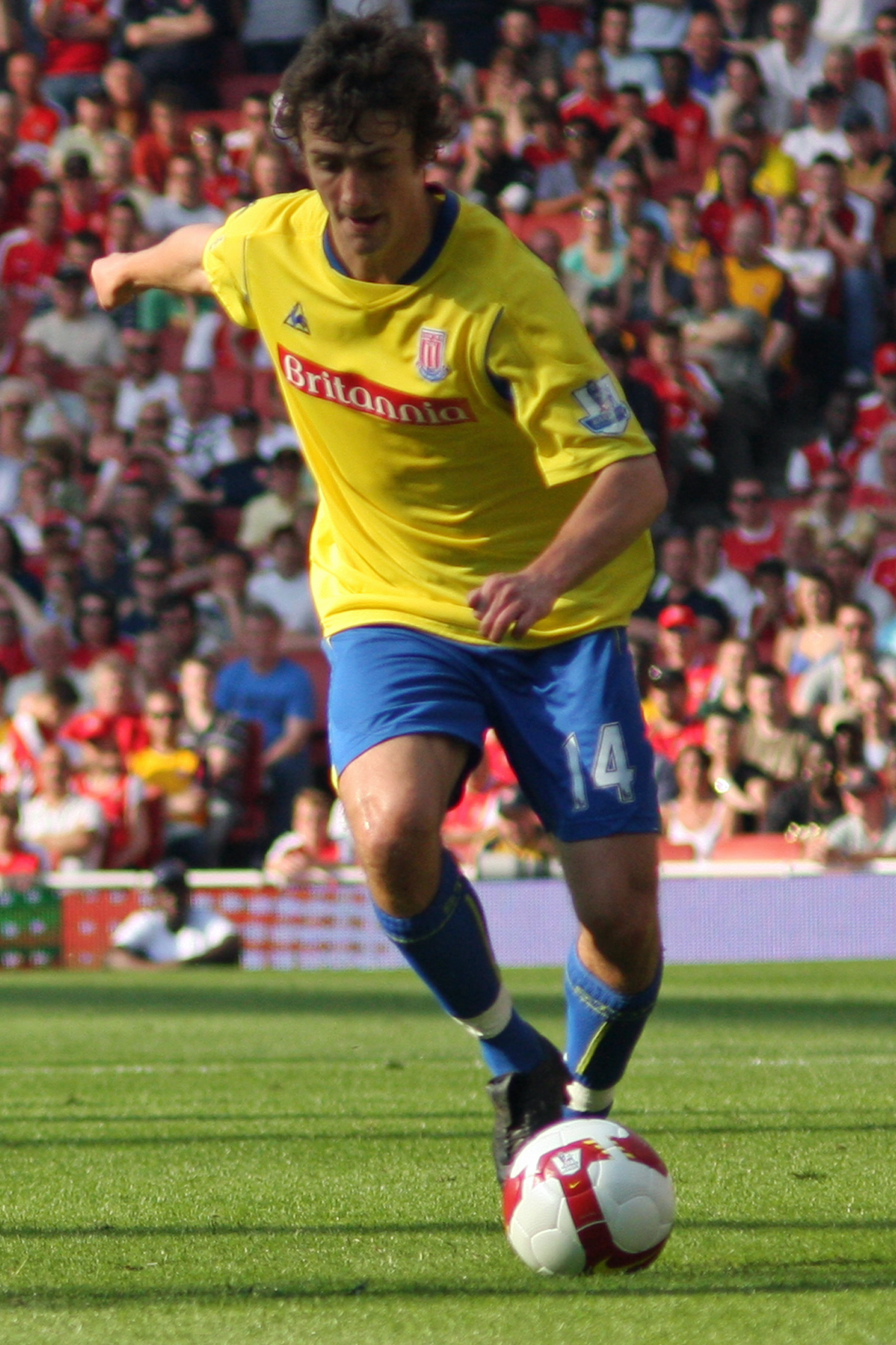
Danny Pugh made 38 appearances.

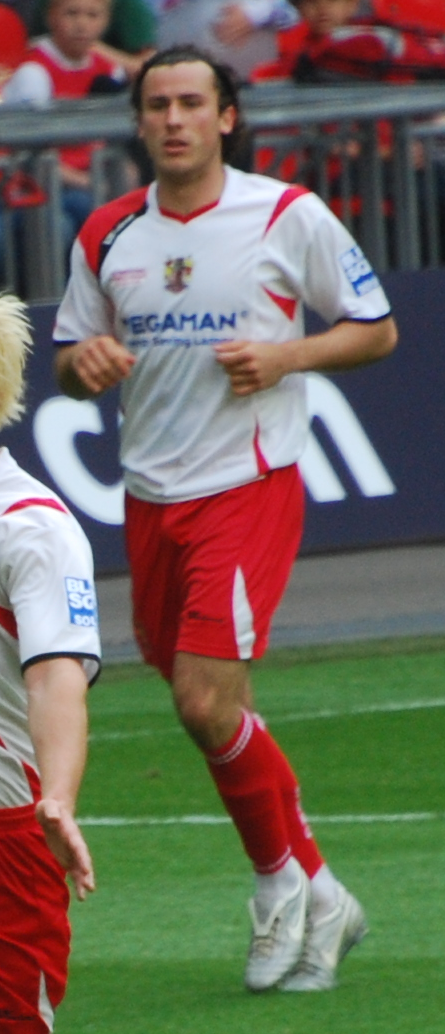
Lawrie Wilson had a poor career at Vale Park.

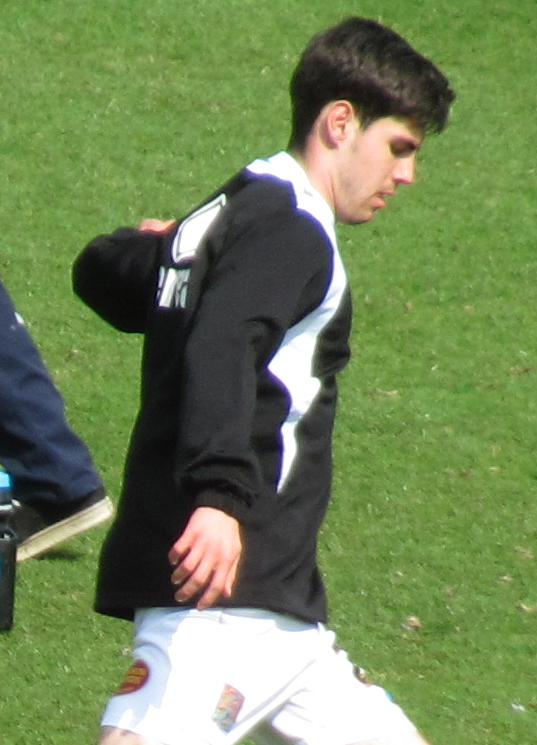
Joe Davis rejoined the club after three years away.

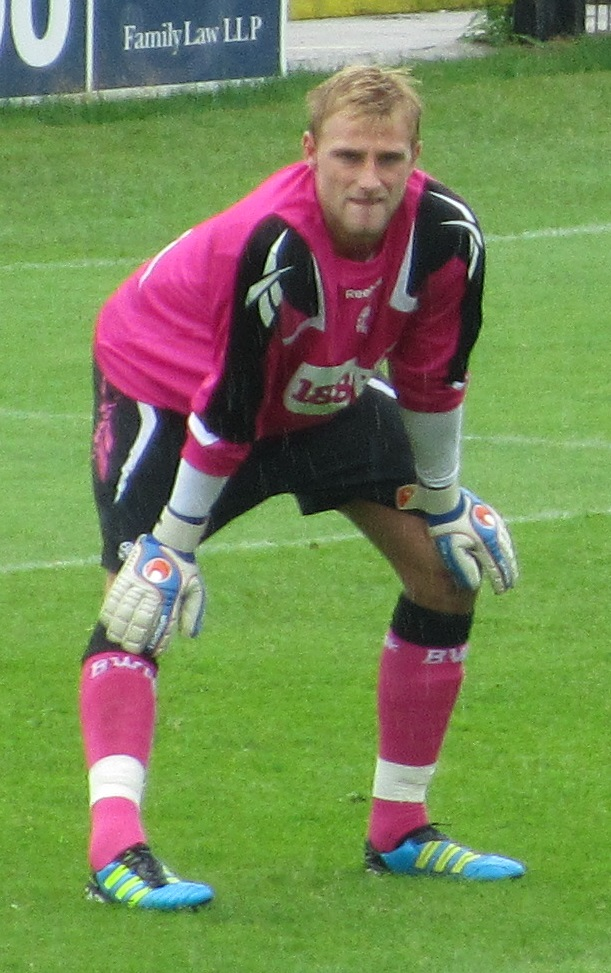
Rob Lainton had the #1 shirt but featured just seven times.

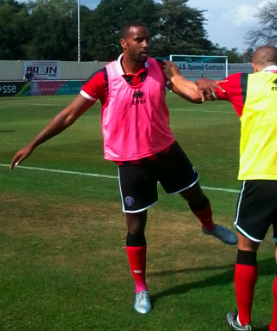
Tyrone Barnett was transfer-listed after scoring just two goals.

== Overview ==
=== EFL League Two ===
Despite being unable to prevent relegation as caretaker manager the previous season, Michael Brown was confirmed as the club's new permanent manager in May 2017; incumbent assistants David "Ned" Kelly and Chris Morgan also retained their positions, as did chief scout Darren Wrack. Brown said that the budget available left him with "a good chance of gaining promotion". His first summer signing was former two-time Player of the Year Tom Pope on a free transfer after he managed to secure his release from Bury. He made his second signing four weeks later, goalkeeper Rob Lainton, who also arrived on a free transfer from Bury. Also arriving were Colombian winger Cristian Montaño, released from Bristol Rovers, and former Vale youth team centre-back Joe Davis, on a free transfer from Fleetwood Town, and 22-year-old Burton Albion goalkeeper Sam Hornby. These signings were quickly followed by the arrival of 19-year-old Sheffield United left-back Graham Kelly. A third Bury player also arrived in the form of 34-year-old centre-back Antony Kay, a veteran of over 600 professional matches. However, Brown also revealed that defender Kjell Knops had picked up an infection in his knee and missed the entire season after undergoing surgery.

Heading into July, Brown brought in target man striker Tyrone Barnett on a free transfer from AFC Wimbledon. He took on a wide variety of players on trial, including: Danny Green, Neal Eardley, Michael Tonge, Gavin Gunning, Billy Whitehouse, Tom Walker, Gaetan Lenoir, and Nicolas Guidicelli. He signed 19-year-old Huddersfield Town striker Rekeil Pyke on a season-long loan. As last season's captain Ben Purkiss rejected a new contract offer, Brown signed right-back Lawrie Wilson on a free transfer from Bolton Wanderers to replace him. Having decided against signing one of the wingers on trial, Brown instead brought in Burton Albion's Marcus Harness on a season-long loan. On the same day that Barnett was revealed to have suffered a serious hamstring tear, the club announced that trialist centre-back Gavin Gunning had signed a contract of undisclosed-length. The day before the opening game of the season, Brown secured veteran trialist midfielder Michael Tonge to a one-year deal, and also brought in 21-year-old winger Ben Whitfield on a half-season loan from AFC Bournemouth.

Brown played eight débutantes at Crawley Town on 5 August, and it was two of these, Kay and Tonge, who scored the opening goals of a 3–1 victory, finished off with a first league goal for Dan Turner. Two days later Brown signed 21-year-old left-back Tyler Denton on a season-long loan from Leeds United. Adebayo Akinfenwa put Wycombe Wanderers ahead within two minutes of the opening home game of the season at Vale Park on 12 August, and by the 25-minute mark he had scored the opposition's final goal of a 3–2 defeat for the "Valiants". In the week following the defeat to Wycombe, both Anton Forrester and Danny Pugh were ruled out of action for three to four months, and Brown signed 20-year-old Sheffield Wednesday winger Jack Stobbs on a season-long loan. The match at Chesterfield was declared "Ernie Moss Day" in tribute to the legend of both clubs, but another poor performance saw Vale slip to a 2–0 defeat to a side that had previously failed to pick up a point. Fans booed the team and turned on the manager, chanting 'You don't know what you're doing'. In the week building up to the local derby with Crewe Alexandra, Brown signed highly rated midfielder David Worrall. Worrall made his debut against Crewe, but it was midfield partner Michael Tonge who made the headlines for the wrong reasons, as he was sent off four minutes after Crewe's Chris Dagnall scored the only goal of the game on the half-hour mark; Brown said that Tonge was unlucky to be sent off and he was proud of his team's performance. On the final day before the summer transfer window closed, Brown signed Burnley centre-back Tom Anderson on a season-long loan and Doncaster Rovers central midfielder Harry Middleton on a free transfer.

Vale fell to 23rd-place at the beginning of September with a 1–0 home defeat to Notts County; Brown said his team were "sucker punched, against the run of play". Seven days later Tyrone Barnett returned from injury to make his Vale debut at Coventry City, however, goalkeeper Lainton picked up an injury as Vale fell to rock bottom of the Football League with a 1–0 defeat despite playing against ten-men for the closing stages of the game; the injury-list now included Lainton, Pugh, Montaño, Forrester, Pyke, Knops, with Tonge suspended. A sixth consecutive league loss followed in a 2–0 defeat at Luton Town, which was also the sixth-successive game in all competitions in which Vale had failed to score a goal – a club record. Chief Executive Colin Garlick said the club had not set any ultimatum to Brown for the home game with second-from-bottom Forest Green Rovers on 16 September. Brown signed Derby County goalkeeper Kelle Roos on an emergency loan and played him against Forest Green. Turner broke Vale's barren spell against Forest Green, scoring his third of the campaign in a rare start, but Rovers made three early substitutions and came back into the game to force a 1–1 draw which kept Vale bottom of the table; despite this Brown was confident he would still be in charge of the club for the following match. His confidence was misplaced however, as he was sacked shortly after the match; his assistants, David "Ned" Kelly and Chris Morgan were placed in charge of the club on an interim basis. They first took charge for the trip to Yeovil Town on 23 September, and were on the way to a 1–0 win when an error from Roos gifted Yeovil an equaliser; Vale ended up holding on to a 1–1 draw after James Gibbons marked his league debut with a sending off for two yellow cards. Three days later they took the lead at home to high-flying Accrington Stanley, but fell to a 2–1 defeat after a Billy Kee brace either side of half-time. The run of poor form continued with a 2–0 defeat at Stevenage. Meanwhile, the search for a new manager dragged on, as Smurthwaite ruled out National League managers John Askey and Neil Aspin, stating that the list of prospective names had been narrowed down to three 'exceptional' candidates.

Despite previously being ruled out by Smurthwaite, Gateshead manager Neil Aspin was installed as Port Vale manager on 4 October, advised by former manager John Rudge in a director of football role. Three days later his new team got off to an excellent start at home to Grimsby Town as they were leading 1–0 at half-time with a Tom Pope goal, but then a second-half turnaround saw them lose the match 2–1 and slip back into the relegation zone. Aspin managed a victory in his second game though, with Pope scoring a brace in a 3–1 home win over Cheltenham Town. Aspin went on to name Danny Pugh as the club's new captain, ahead of the dropped Antony Kay. Vale then recorded a 3–0 win at Morecambe, with Pope again scoring a brace and Montaño marking his return to action with his first goal for the club. Pope again scored at third-placed Exeter City to give Vale a 1–0 victory in blustery conditions. Following an injury to Roos, Aspin acted swiftly to sign the big Bulgarian goalkeeper Dimitar Evtimov on loan from Nottingham Forest, who started immediately in the 3–0 home defeat to Swindon Town. Aspin said he was "very disappointed about the whole goalkeeping situation". Aspin went on to be nominated for the EFL League Two Manager of the Month award and Pope was nominated for the EFL League Two Player of the Month award, after three wins in five games and five goals and one assist for Pope.

Going into November, Aspin signed 20-year box-to-box midfielder Chris Regis, who had previously entered non-League football after spending time on the books at Arsenal, Southampton and Colchester United. Vale then travelled to Newport County, and returned home with a point after coming back from 1–0 down, Anton Forrester scoring with his first league appearance of the campaign. Fellow relegation battlers Barnet arrived in Burslem on 18 November, and Vale claimed a hard-fought victory after Pope converted a late penalty won by Gibbons. This was Port Vale's first penalty since 20 January. However, three days later the Vale fell to a 4–0 defeat at home to Mansfield Town, though Aspin said his team worked hard and the scoreline was not a fair reflection on the game. They then suffered a 3–1 defeat away to Lincoln City, having looked second best to the National League champions for most of the match; Aspin said the performance was not good enough. Also in November, long-serving full-back Adam Yates returned from a loan spell at Macclesfield Town only to suffer extensive facial injuries in a collision with Hornby in a reserve team match; despite his injury and in light of his service to the club, Yates was given a contract extension to keep him on until the end of the season. However, he went on to announce his retirement from playing in March.

Aspin paid tribute to supporters who helped clear snow off the pitch before an important 2–0 home win over Cambridge United on 9 December; Montaño scored both of the goals either side of half-time, helping to put an end to the team's recent run of bad results. They continued their good form under Aspin with a 2–1 victory at Carlisle United, as he changed tactics with the scores at 0–0 after sensing the hosts were there to be beaten. The following week the club and Aspin agreed on a new two-and-a-half-year contract. The team celebrated by securing a useful point at play-off hopefuls Colchester United, coming from a goal down at half-time to draw the game 1–1. Nathan Smith then scored the only goal of the Boxing day game with play-off chasing Coventry City. They ended the year in style with a 4–0 home victory over league leaders Luton, which left them ten points clear of the relegation zone and nine points off the play-offs; "Hatters" boss Nathan Jones said that "they were better than us all over the park. They got second balls, they outworked us, we didn't handle Pope all afternoon and we got what we deserved." Aspin was nominated for that month's EFL League Two Manager of the Month award, though lost out to Danny Cowley at Lincoln City.

Vale opened the New Year with a 1–0 defeat at second-placed Notts County, and though Aspin was pleased with his players he was highly critical of the referee for his award of a late penalty, calling it "a really bad decision". Earlier in the day he made his second signing as manager, bringing in striker Dior Angus from non-League Redditch United. Meanwhile, Gavin Gunning left the club on the expiry of his contract, whilst Jack Stobbs, Rekeil Pyke and Tyler Denton returned to their parent clubs. In contrast, Whitfield's loan was extended until the end of the season. Gunning made his debut for Forest Green on 6 January, and kept a clean sheet as Rovers beat the Vale 1–0 with a goal from fellow débutante Reuben Reid; Aspin apologized to supporters after the match for the team's performance. Aspin went on to allow Lawrie Wilson to join National League side Ebbsfleet United after the full-back failed to make the first-team under his tenure. He also agreed to terminate the contract of French midfielder Anthony de Freitas, whilst bringing in striker Donovan Wilson on loan from Wolverhampton Wanderers. Vale put in a poor performance at home to Yeovil, though did claim a 1–1 draw after Pope converted a late penalty. Aspin went on to sign midfielder Luke Hannant from Gateshead for an undisclosed fee, having previously signed the 24-year-old from Team Northumbria in 2016. He also boosted the defensive numbers by bringing in centre-back Zak Jules on loan from Shrewsbury Town. Hannant made his debut at Accrington Stanley on 20 January, a game in which Vale led 2–0 at half-time only to lose 3–2; Aspin went on to criticise both the referee for failing to spot a handball for Accrington's equaliser and also his team for poor defending. Jules made his debut and Lainton returned to the starting eleven for the visit of Colchester on 27 January, and Vale managed to secure a 2–2 draw despite a poor performance thanks to a brace from Worrall. A surprise departure was then announced, as Anderson was recalled early from his loan spell by Burnley. Aspin responded quickly by signing former youth-team centre-back Charlie Raglan on loan from Oxford United, 21-year-old defender Kyle Howkins on loan from West Bromwich Albion and 23-year-old defender Callum Howe for an undisclosed fee from Lincoln City.

Raglan started at home to struggling Morecambe on 3 February and helped the defence to keep a clean sheet in a dour 0–0 draw. However, they then conceded five at Cheltenham Town, including a hat-trick from Mohamed Eisa, after long spells of defensive errors. Tonge opened the scoring at Swindon on 17 February, but defensive and goalkeeping errors from the returning Ryan Boot ended up costing the team a 3–2 defeat, with former player Marc Richards scoring a brace. Vale then kept a clean sheet at home to Newport County, but played poorly and only picked up a point whilst relegation rivals Chesterfield, Barnet, Forest Green, Crewe Alex and Morecambe all gained three points.

Without a win since 2017, Vale then lost top-scorer Tom Pope for the month of March after he was forced to undergo an operation to repair a hernia. Grimsby Town were in even worse form however, and on 10 March Vale seemed to be on their way to a vital 1–0 away win despite missing a penalty; however, a stoppage-time equaliser from James Berrett extended Vale's winless streak and instigated a pitch invasion and punch-up from amongst the away end. They then faced a hastily rearranged trip to bottom club Barnet three days later, and salvaged a 1–1 draw after Forrester capitalised on a goalkeeping error. Vale went on to come from two goals down at Stevenage to salvage a point, Wilson and Hannant scoring their first goals for the club, to maintain a healthy seven point gap with the relegation zone with only nine games left to play. Despite a decent performance, they failed to extend this gap after losing 1–0 at home to promotion-chasing Exeter. Vale went on to gain a useful point with a hard-working performance during a 0–0 draw at third-place Wycombe; Boot's performance in goal earned him a place on the EFL Team of the Week. They hosted 23rd-placed Chesterfield in a crucial game on Good Friday, and Pugh went from hero to villain on the cusp of half-time as he scored the opening goal and then got sent off for a studs up challenge two minutes later to leave his teammates to defend their 1–0 lead with ten men over the course of the second half; Vale did concede an equaliser, before substitute Whitfield won the game late on with an excellent strike.

Vale took the short trip to Crewe on 2 April and started poorly after an error from Boot gifted Ryan Wintle the opening goal on seven minutes, but they equalised before half-time with a penalty against the run of play; Kay seemed to have scored the winning goal from long-range on 71 minutes, but a stoppage-time equaliser from Charlie Kirk denied Vale the three points. Five days later Vale lost 2–1 at home to Crawley after Smith gave away a penalty and scored an own goal, though the penalty decision of referee Mike Jones was highly contentious; Aspin called the referee's performance 'diabolical'. Newly crowned EFL Trophy champions Lincoln visited Vale Park on 14 April, and Vale all but secured their safety on that day after Kay scored the winner on 63 minutes. Vale set up defensively at Mansfield and managed to rescue a point after a late equalising goal from Pope cancelled out a clumsy own goal; after match Aspin summarised the season by saying that "I think they have done well, from the position they were in, to getting to safety." Angus scored on his home debut on 28 April, but this was not enough to prevent the final match of the season at Vale Park being a 2–1 defeat to Carlisle United, much to Aspin's disappointment.

Vale ended their league campaign with a 5–0 defeat at Cambridge United, leaving them in 20th place – the joint-lowest finish in the club's history (the other being the 1979–80 season). At the end of the season Aspin released ten players – Chris Regis, Ryan Boot, Luke Dennis, Anton Forrester, Graham Kelly, Kjell Knops, Harry Middleton, Billy Reeves, Joe Slinn and Charlie Walford – and transfer-listed Tyrone Barnett, Joe Davis, Callum Howe and Rob Lainton, as he attempted to build his own squad for the 2018–19 season.

=== Finances & ownership issues ===
Norman Smurthwaite resigned as chairman at the end of the 2016–17 season, and 67-year-old former British Rail manager and lifelong Vale supporter Tony Fradley was unveiled as his successor, though Smurthwaite remained as owner. Following relegation, season ticket prices were cut by £50 to £295 with under-12s allowed in for free. The new shirt sponsors were the manorshop.com, owned by Kidsgrove businessman Kevin Jones, who had made a failed attempt to buy the club in May 2017. Speaking in August, Smurthwaite said that the wage budget was 20% higher than the previous season due to the extra money raised from the sales of Jak Alnwick and Anthony Grant in January 2017. The club took out £50,000 in 'promotion insurance', which would cover the cost in bonuses should the club achieve promotion at the end of the season. On 31 January 2018, the sale of Jordan Hugill from Preston North End to West Ham United gained Vale around £1.8 million thanks to a 20% sell on clause negotiated by Micky Adams following his departure from Vale Park in 2014.

Smurthwaite attended the Port Vale Supporters Club meeting in March and stated that the club was losing around £150,000 a month, that the playing budget was £1.6 million (he believed this to be a top ten League Two budget), that he would only sell to the right buyer and would not be publicly naming his asking price, that when he took over the club the Football League appointed Karl Oyston as his mentor, and he challenged the fans to raise £800,000 among themselves (£270 each for the club's 3,000 hardcore supporters) to fund the club throughout the summer in a "positive way of demonstrating to me that you don't want me".

=== Cup competitions ===
Vale had a difficult tie at home to EFL League One side Oxford United in the first round of the FA Cup, but proved to be the superior side on the night as they progressed with a 2−0 win thanks to goals from Gunning and Pope. A home tie with Yeovil Town awaited in the second round, and for the first time since 20 January 1982 Staffordshire Police granted the club permission to play a home tie at the same date and time as Stoke City. Despite a poor first half Vale seemed to have the game won thanks to a Tom Pope header, but the team switched off defensively to allow substitute Jordan Green to score a last-minute equaliser and take the game to a replay. The game at Huish Park proved eventful, as red cards for Montaño and Gibbons did not prevent the Vale from twice equalising the match before eventually losing 3–2 after extra time; Harness had scored his first goal for the club to take the game into extra-time in style with a long-range shot, but his effort was upstaged by Kay, who scored the "goal of his life" with a stunning long-range lob. Aspin was highly critical of referee Gavin Ward, particularly for his decision to both issue a penalty and send off Montaño for a "soft" challenge.

Vale were drawn away to EFL Championship club Leeds United in the first round of the EFL Cup. Before the match Brown spoke of his pride at managing against former club Leeds. He named another former Leeds player, Danny Pugh, as captain for the night. However, the match ended on a sour note as Brown accused hat-trick hero Samuel Sáiz of spitting at Davis just before half-time, and Gunning was sent off as Vale fell to a 4–1 defeat.

Vale were drawn into EFL Trophy Northern Group D, alongside Oldham Athletic, Newcastle United Academy, and local rivals Crewe Alexandra. They began the group with their solitary away game, playing out a 0–0 draw with League One side Oldham at Boundary Park, before they managed to pick up two points after winning the resulting penalty shoot-out. Vale then recorded a 1–0 victory over the Newcastle United Academy in front of a first-team record low crowd at Vale Park of 824. The game against already eliminated Crewe was largely inconsequential but proved to be an entertaining one as Regis marked his debut with a goal in a 4–2 win. League One high-flyers Shrewsbury Town came to Burslem in the second round. Vale sensed an upset after Montaño scored in the first minute, but former Valiant Louis Dodds initiated a second-half comeback to eliminate Vale from the competition.

== Results ==
=== Pre-season ===
8 July 2017 Friendly	Kidsgrove Athletic	0–6	Port Vale	Kidsgrove
15:00 BST		Report	Barnett 5', 13'; Pyke 48', 69'; Pope; Montaño 85'	Stadium: The Novus Stadium; Attendance: 1,473

11 July 2017 Friendly	Newcastle Town	0–8	Port Vale	Newcastle-under-Lyme
19:30 BST		Report	Montaño 34'; Walker 45'; De Freitas 46', 76'; Green 54', 72'; Pyke 55', 88'	Stadium: Lyme Valley Stadium; Attendance: 709

15 July 2017 Friendly	Buxton	1–1	Port Vale	Buxton
13:30 BST	Hardy 37'	Report	Pyke 54'	Stadium: The Silverlands; Attendance: 514

18 July 2017 Friendly	Port Vale	0–1	Derby County	Burslem
19:45 BST		Report	Bent 51' (pen.)	Stadium: Vale Park; Attendance: 1,657

29 July 2017 Friendly	Chester	1–1	Port Vale	Chester
15:00 BST	Bell 68'	Report	Pyke 61'	Stadium: Deva Stadium; Attendance: 1,027

1 August 2017 Friendly	Port Vale	1–1	West Bromwich Albion	Burslem
19:30 BST	Pope 86'	Report	Robson-Kanu 43'	Stadium: Vale Park; Attendance: 1,783; Referee: Sarginson

=== EFL League Two ===
==== League table ====
Pos	Team	Pld	W	D	L	GF	GA	GD	Pts
18	Grimsby Town	46	13	12	21	42	66	−24	51
19	Yeovil Town	46	12	12	22	59	75	−16	48
20	Port Vale	46	11	14	21	49	67	−18	47
21	Forest Green Rovers	46	13	8	25	54	77	−23	47
22	Morecambe	46	9	19	18	41	56	−15	46

Source: BBC Sport
Rules for classification: 1) Points; 2) Goal difference; 3) Number of goals scored

==== Results by matchday ====
Round	1	2	3	4	5	6	7	8	9	10	11	12	13	14	15	16	17	18	19	20	21	22	23	24	25	26	27	28	29	30	31	32	33	34	35	36	37	38	39	40	41	42	43	44	45	46
Ground	A	H	A	H	H	A	A	H	A	H	A	H	H	A	A	H	A	H	H	A	H	A	A	H	H	A	A	H	A	H	H	A	H	H	A	A	H	H	A	H	A	H	H	A	H	A
Result	W	L	L	L	L	L	L	D	D	L	L	L	W	W	W	L	D	W	L	L	W	W	D	W	W	L	L	D	L	D	D	L	L	D	D	D	D	L	D	W	D	L	W	D	L	L
Position	5	10	16	21	23	24	24	24	22	22	22	23	22	22	21	22	20	21	21	22	19	18	18	17	16	18	18	18	18	18	19	19	19	22	22	18	19	20	21	20	19	19	19	18	19	20
Points	3	3	3	3	3	3	3	4	5	5	5	5	8	11	14	14	15	18	18	18	21	24	25	28	31	31	31	32	32	33	34	34	34	35	36	37	38	38	39	42	43	43	46	47	47	47

Source: Statto
A = Away; H = Home; W = Win; D = Draw; L = Loss

==== Matches ====
5 August 2017 1	Crawley Town	1–3	Port Vale	Crawley
15:00 BST	Boldewijn 53'	Report	Tonge 9'; Kay 26'; Turner 82'	Stadium: Broadfield Stadium; Attendance: 2,270; Referee: Charles Breakspear; Assistant referees: Michael Webb, Samuel Ogles; Fourth official: Andrew Laver

12 August 2017 2	Port Vale	2–3	Wycombe Wanderers	Burslem
15:00 BST	Turner 88'; Whitfield 90'	Report	Akinfenwa 2', 25'; Cowan-Hall 12'	Stadium: Vale Park; Attendance: 4,909; Referee: Craig Hicks; Assistant referees: Richard Wild, Joe Simpson; Fourth official: Nigel Smith

19 August 2017 3	Chesterfield	2–0	Port Vale	Chesterfield
15:00 BST	Dennis 38'; Sinnott 43'	Report		Stadium: Proact Stadium; Attendance: 5,058; Referee: Tom Nield; Assistant referees: Richard Bartlett, Danny Gratton; Fourth official: Michael Denton

26 August 2017 4	Port Vale	0–1	Crewe Alexandra	Burslem
15:00 BST		Report	Dagnall 30'	Stadium: Vale Park; Attendance: 6,299; Referee: Darren Handley; Assistant referees: Christopher Ward, Richard Wigglesworth; Fourth official: David Plowright

2 September 2017 5	Port Vale	0–1	Notts County	Burslem
15:00 BST		Report	Alessandra 67'	Stadium: Vale Park; Attendance: 4,656; Referee: Robert Lewis; Assistant referees: Nicholas Barnard, Christopher Kidd; Fourth official: James Wilson

9 September 2017 6	Coventry City	1–0	Port Vale	Coventry
15:00 BST	Jones 24'	Report		Stadium: Ricoh Arena; Attendance: 6,951; Referee: Brett Huxtable; Assistant referees: Matthew Parry, Ken Haycock; Fourth official: Marc Wilson

12 September 2017 7	Luton Town	2–0	Port Vale	Luton
19:45 BST	Whitfield 38' (og.); Stacey 50'	Report		Stadium: Kenilworth Road; Attendance: 7,046; Referee: David Webb; Assistant referees: Andrew Laver, Louis Marks; Fourth official: Geoff Russell

16 September 2017 8	Port Vale	1–1	Forest Green Rovers	Burslem
15:00 BST	Turner 21'	Report	Bugiel 68'	Stadium: Vale Park; Attendance: 3,910; Referee: Martin Coy; Assistant referees: Chris Isherwood, Ian Dudley; Fourth official: Matthew Jones

23 September 2017 9	Yeovil Town	1–1	Port Vale	Yeovil
15:00 BST	Khan 66'	Report	Pope 29'	Stadium: Huish Park; Attendance: 2,614; Referee: Graham Salisbury; Assistant referees: Michael Trevethan, Simon Shaw; Fourth official: Mark Pottage

26 September 2017 10	Port Vale	1–2	Accrington Stanley	Burslem
19:45 BST	Worrall 22'	Report	Kee 36', 62'	Stadium: Vale Park; Attendance: 3,360; Referee: Eddie Ilderton; Assistant referees: Joe Clark, Peter Gooch, Paul Thompson; Fourth official: Craig Taylor

30 September 2017 11	Stevenage	2–0	Port Vale	Stevenage
15:00 BST	Newton 22'; Smith 54'	Report		Stadium: Broadhall Way; Attendance: 2,678; Referee: Charles Breakspear; Assistant referees: Nigel Smith, Daniel Cook; Fourth official: Ben Cooke

7 October 2017 12	Port Vale	1–2	Grimsby Town	Burslem
15:00 BST	Pope 39'	Report	Jones 51'; Dembélé 67'	Stadium: Vale Park; Attendance: 5,849; Referee: Andy Woolmer; Assistant referees: Richard Wigglesworth, Barry Cropp; Fourth official: Oliver Langford

14 October 2017 13	Port Vale	3–1	Cheltenham Town	Burslem
15:00 BST	Pope 26', 80'; Whitfield 61'	Report	Dawson 90+1'	Stadium: Vale Park; Attendance: 4,277; Referee: Scott Oldham; Assistant referees: David Plowright, Joe Simpson; Fourth official: Matthew Parry

17 October 2017 14	Morecambe	0–3	Port Vale	Morecambe
19:45 BST		Report	Pope 18', 67'; Montaño 90+2'	Stadium: Globe Arena; Attendance: 1,241; Referee: Ross Joyce; Assistant referees: Matthew Jones, Kevin Mulraine; Fourth official: David Webb

21 October 2017 15	Exeter City	0–1	Port Vale	Exeter
15:00 BST		Report	Pope 25'	Stadium: St James Park; Attendance: 4,258; Referee: Craig Hicks; Assistant referees: Kevin Morris, Simon Knapp; Fourth official: Adrian Tranter

28 October 2017 16	Port Vale	0–3	Swindon Town	Burslem
15:00 BST		Report	Taylor 51'; Mullin 71'; Gordon 85'	Stadium: Vale Park; Attendance: 5,071; Referee: Graham Horwood; Assistant referees: Stephen Wade, Craig Taylor; Fourth official: Nicholas Barnard

10 November 2017 17	Newport County	1–1	Port Vale	Newport, Wales
19:45 GMT	Dolan 54'	Report	Forrester 80'	Stadium: Rodney Parade; Attendance: 2,876; Referee: John Busby; Assistant referees: Ron Ganfield, Robert Dabbs; Fourth official: Dumitru-Ravel Cheosiaua

18 November 2017 18	Port Vale	1–0	Barnet	Burslem
15:00 GMT	Pope 80' (pen.)	Report		Stadium: Vale Park; Attendance: 4,207; Referee: Anthony Backhouse; Assistant referees: Alan Clayton, Gary Hilton; Fourth official: David Benton

21 November 2017 19	Port Vale	0–4	Mansfield Town	Burslem
19:45 GMT		Report	Diamond 43', 52'; Rose 54'; Hemmings 63'	Stadium: Vale Park; Attendance: 3,878; Referee: Trevor Kettle; Assistant referees: Joe Simpson, Nigel Smith; Fourth official: Richard Bartlett

25 November 2017 20	Lincoln City	3–1	Port Vale	Lincoln
15:00 GMT	Green 10'; Bostwick 53'; Waterfall 69'	Report	Pugh 45+1'	Stadium: Sincil Bank; Attendance: 7,562; Referee: Andy Haines; Assistant referees: Wayne Grunnill, Alf Greenwood; Fourth official: David Plowright

9 December 2017 21	Port Vale	2–0	Cambridge United	Burslem
15:00 GMT	Montaño 45', 47'	Report		Stadium: Vale Park; Attendance: 3,129; Referee: Antony Coggins; Assistant referees: Richard Wild, Mark Cunliffe; Fourth official: Matthew Jones

16 December 2017 22	Carlisle United	1–2	Port Vale	Carlisle
15:00 GMT	Bennett 80'	Report	Barnett 51'; Pope 69'	Stadium: Brunton Park; Attendance: 4,090; Referee: Michael Salisbury; Assistant referees: Paul Newhouse, Chris Isherwood; Fourth official: Simon Clayton

23 December 2017 23	Colchester United	1–1	Port Vale	Colchester
15:00 GMT	Szmodics 32'	Report	Harness 75'	Stadium: Colchester Community Stadium; Attendance: 3,485; Referee: Nick Kinseley; Assistant referees: Paul Yates, Graham Kane; Fourth official: Michael George

26 December 2017 24	Port Vale	1–0	Coventry City	Burslem
15:00 GMT	Smith 79'	Report		Stadium: Vale Park; Attendance: 7,127; Referee: John Brooks; Assistant referees: Joe Clark, Dumitru-Ravel Cheosiaua; Fourth official: Nicholas Barnard

30 December 2017 25	Port Vale	4–0	Luton Town	Burslem
15:00 GMT	Potts 23' (og.); Pope 60', 82'; Whitfield 70'	Report		Stadium: Vale Park; Attendance: 5,523; Referee: Tom Nield; Assistant referees: David Benton, Declan Ford; Fourth official: Christopher Ward

1 January 2018 26	Notts County	1–0	Port Vale	Nottingham
15:00 GMT	Stead 86' (pen.)	Report		Stadium: Meadow Lane; Attendance: 7,241; Referee: Darren Handley; Assistant referees: Richard Wild, Ken Haycock; Fourth official: Ian Rathbone

6 January 2018 27	Forest Green Rovers	1–0	Port Vale	Nailsworth
15:00 GMT	Reid 61'	Report		Stadium: The New Lawn; Attendance: 2,437; Referee: Keith Stroud; Assistant referees: Christopher Husband, Michael D'Aguilar; Fourth official: Andy Davies

13 January 2018 28	Port Vale	1–1	Yeovil Town	Burslem
15:00 GMT	Pope 86' (pen.)	Report	Zoko 11'	Stadium: Vale Park; Attendance: 4,120; Referee: David Webb; Assistant referees: Ian Dudley, Andy Hendley; Fourth official: Alan Clayton

20 January 2018 29	Accrington Stanley	3–2	Port Vale	Accrington
15:00 GMT	McConville 51', 72'; Kee 54'	Report	Pope 3'; Tonge 41'	Stadium: Crown Ground; Attendance: 1,743; Referee: Ross Joyce; Assistant referees: Kevin Mulraine, Gareth Mellor; Fourth official: Thomas Kirk

27 January 2018 30	Port Vale	2–2	Colchester United	Burslem
15:00 GMT	Worrall 33', 87'	Report	Senior 12'; Wright 45+4'	Stadium: Vale Park; Attendance: 4,044; Referee: Trevor Kettle; Assistant referees: Simon Shaw, Mark Griffiths; Fourth official: Alix Pashley

3 February 2018 31	Port Vale	0–0	Morecambe	Burslem
15:00 GMT		Report		Stadium: Vale Park; Attendance: 3,968; Referee: Ben Toner; Assistant referees: Paul Graham, Chris Isherwood; Fourth official: Gary Hilton

10 February 2018 32	Cheltenham Town	5–1	Port Vale	Cheltenham
15:00 GMT	Eisa 13', 44', 79'; Adebayo 66'; Boyle 86'	Report	Pope 35' (pen.)	Stadium: Whaddon Road; Attendance: 2,731; Referee: Brett Huxtable; Assistant referees: Craig Taylor, Kevin Morris; Fourth official: Kevin Howick

17 February 2018 33	Swindon Town	3–2	Port Vale	Swindon
15:00 GMT	Richards 24', 40'; Mullin 88'	Report	Tonge 11'; Montaño 43'	Stadium: County Ground; Attendance: 5,713; Referee: Andy Woolmer; Assistant referees: Philip Dermott, Mark Russell; Fourth official: Darren Blunden

24 February 2018 34	Port Vale	0–0	Newport County	Burslem
15:00 GMT		Report		Stadium: Vale Park; Attendance: 4,013; Referee: Tom Nield; Assistant referees: Richard Wigglesworth, Christopher Ward; Fourth official: Richard Wild

10 March 2018 35	Grimsby Town	1–1	Port Vale	Cleethorpes
15:00 GMT	Berrett 90+1'	Report	Worrall 10'	Stadium: Blundell Park; Attendance: 5,198; Referee: Seb Stockbridge; Assistant referees: Paul Thompson, Simon Clayton; Fourth official: Declan Ford

13 March 2018 36	Barnet	1–1	Port Vale	Edgware, London
20:00 GMT	Nicholls 4'	Report	Forrester 51'	Stadium: The Hive Stadium; Attendance: 1,153; Referee: Brendan Malone; Assistant referees: Andrew Aylott, Matthew Lee, Samuel Ogles; Fourth official: Louis Marks

17 March 2018 37	Port Vale	2–2	Stevenage	Burslem
15:00 GMT	Wilson 65'; Hannant 77'	Report	Amos 10'; Kennedy 48'	Stadium: Vale Park; Attendance: 3,462; Referee: Anthony Backhouse; Assistant referees: Gareth Mellor, Lee Freeman; Fourth official: Craig Taylor

20 March 2018 38	Port Vale	0–1	Exeter City	Burslem
19:45 GMT		Report	Storey 24'	Stadium: Vale Park; Attendance: 3,138; Referee: Dean Whitestone; Assistant referees: Nicholas Barnard, Ron Ganfield; Fourth official: Dumitru-Ravel Cheosiaua

24 March 2018 39	Wycombe Wanderers	0–0	Port Vale	High Wycombe
15:00 GMT		Report		Stadium: Adams Park; Attendance: 4,620; Referee: Lee Swabey; Assistant referees: Andrew Laver, Paul Yates; Fourth official: Gary Parsons

30 March 2018 40	Port Vale	2–1	Chesterfield	Burslem
15:00 BST	Pugh 45'; Whitfield 82'	Report	Reed 56'	Stadium: Vale Park; Attendance: 5,713; Referee: Tony Harrington; Assistant referees: Paul Hodskinson, Adam Matthews; Fourth official: Ross Joyce

2 April 2018 41	Crewe Alexandra	2–2	Port Vale	Crewe
15:00 BST	Wintle 7'; Kirk 90+3'	Report	Pope 36' (pen.); Kay 71'	Stadium: Gresty Road; Attendance: 6,680; Referee: Andy Woolmer; Assistant referees: Adam Crysell, Steven Meredith; Fourth official: Tom Nield

7 April 2018 42	Port Vale	1–2	Crawley Town	Burslem
15:00 BST	Pope 20'	Report	Payne 29' (pen.); Smith 82' (og.)	Stadium: Vale Park; Attendance: 4,005; Referee: Mike Jones; Assistant referees: Lisa Rashid, Ian Siddall; Fourth official: Christopher Ward

14 April 2018 43	Port Vale	1–0	Lincoln City	Burslem
15:00 BST	Kay 63'	Report		Stadium: Vale Park; Attendance: 5,580; Referee: John Busby; Assistant referees: Richard Bartlett, Alan Clayton; Fourth official: Michael Denton

21 April 2018 44	Mansfield Town	1–1	Port Vale	Mansfield
15:00 BST	Howkins 73' (og.)	Report	Pope 89'	Stadium: Field Mill; Attendance: 4,210; Referee: Carl Boyeson; Assistant referees: Ken Haycock, Andy Newbold; Fourth official: Oliver Bickle

28 April 2018 45	Port Vale	1–2	Carlisle United	Burslem
15:00 BST	Angus 34'	Report	Nadesan 51'; Hope 70'	Stadium: Vale Park; Attendance: 5,163; Referee: Ben Toner; Assistant referees: Ian Dudley, David Benton; Fourth official: Richard Wigglesworth

5 May 2018 46	Cambridge United	5–0	Port Vale	Cambridge
15:00 BST	Amoo 33'; Dunk 35'; Halliday 68'; Corr 74'; Waters 78'	Report		Stadium: Abbey Stadium; Attendance: 4,808; Referee: Craig Hicks; Assistant referees: Andrew Aylott, Ian Smedley; Fourth official: Steven Plane

=== FA Cup ===
3 November 2017 R1	Port Vale	2–0	Oxford United	Burslem
19:45 BST	Gunning 16'; Pope 53'	Report		Stadium: Vale Park; Attendance: 3,443; Referee: Mark Heywood; Assistant referees: Darren Strain, Anthony Moore; Fourth official: Joe Hull

2 December 2017 R2	Port Vale	1–1	Yeovil Town	Burslem
15:00 BST	Pope 63'	Report	Green 89'	Stadium: Vale Park; Attendance: 3,316; Referee: Scott Oldham; Assistant referees: Richard Wigglesworth, Andy Hendley; Fourth official: Peter Wright

12 December 2017 Replay	Yeovil Town	3–2 (a.e.t.)	Port Vale	Yeovil
19:45 BST	Khan 45+2' (pen.), 95'; Zoko 109'	Report	Harness 83'; Kay 108'	Stadium: Huish Park; Attendance: 1,588; Referee: Gavin Ward; Assistant referees: Michael Webb, Mark Derrien; Fourth official: Brett Huxtable

=== EFL Cup ===
9 August 2017 R1	Leeds United	4–1	Port Vale	Leeds
19:45 BST	Sáiz 13', 60', 62'; Ekuban 83'	Report	Tonge 36'	Stadium: Elland Road; Attendance: 15,431; Referee: Peter Bankes; Assistant referees: Paul Hodskinson, Matt McGrath; Fourth official: Mark Dwyer

=== EFL Trophy ===
Pos	Lge	Team	Pld	W	PW	PL	L	GF	GA	GD	Pts	Qualification
1	L2	Port Vale (Q)	3	2	1	0	0	5	2	+3	8	Round 2
2	L1	Oldham Athletic (Q)	3	2	0	1	0	5	1	+4	7	Round 2
3	ACA	Newcastle United U21s (E)	3	1	0	0	2	3	6	−3	3	
4	L2	Crewe Alexandra (E)	3	0	0	0	3	3	7	−4	0	

Updated to match(es) played on 7 November 2017. Source: EFL.com
(E) Eliminated; (Q) Qualified to the phase indicated

29 August 2017 Group Stage	Oldham Athletic	0–0 (2–4 p)	Port Vale	Oldham
19:30 BST		Report		Stadium: Boundary Park; Referee: Michael Salisbury; Assistant referees: Kevin Mulraine, Gary Hilton; Fourth official: Scott Oldham
	Penalties
	Gerrard (penalty scored); Banks (penalty missed); Fawns (penalty missed); Gardner (penalty scored)		Tonge (penalty scored); Gunning (penalty scored); Pope (penalty scored); Denton (penalty scored)

3 October 2017 Group Stage	Port Vale	1–0	Newcastle United Academy	Burslem
19:45 BST	Barnett 21'	Report		Stadium: Vale Park; Attendance: 824; Assistant referees: Nicholas Hopton, Adam Matthews; Fourth official: Steve Martin

7 November 2017 Group Stage	Port Vale	4–2	Crewe Alexandra	Burslem
19:45 BST	Regis 4'; Forrester 9'; Reeves 65'; Montaño 90'	Report	Reilly 31', 70'	Stadium: Vale Park; Attendance: 1,322; Referee: John Brooks

5 December 2017 R2	Port Vale	1–2	Shrewsbury Town	Burslem
19:45 GMT	Montaño 1'	Report	Dodds 68'; Whalley 81'	Stadium: Vale Park; Attendance: 965; Referee: Graham Salisbury; Assistant referees: Michael D'Aguilar, Gareth Mellor; Fourth official: James Bell

== Squad statistics ==
=== Appearances and goals ===
Key to positions: GK – Goalkeeper; DF – Defender; MF – Midfielder; FW – Forward

No.	Pos	Nat	Player	Total		EFL League Two		FA Cup		EFL Cup		EFL Trophy	
No.	Pos	Nat	Player	Apps	Goals	Apps	Goals	Apps	Goals	Apps	Goals	Apps	Goals
1	GK	(England) ENG	Rob Lainton	7	0	6	0	0	0	1	0	0	0
2	DF	(England) ENG	Callum Howe	3	0	3	0	0	0	0	0	0	0
3	DF	(England) ENG	Zak Jules	2	0	2	0	0	0	0	0	0	0
4	DF	(England) ENG	Charlie Raglan	10	0	10	0	0	0	0	0	0	0
5	DF	(England) ENG	Joe Davis	21	0	18	0	0	0	1	0	2	0
6	DF	(England) ENG	Antony Kay	37	4	33	3	3	1	1	0	0	0
7	MF	(England) ENG	Marcus Harness	42	2	35	1	3	1	1	0	3	0
8	MF	(England) ENG	Danny Pugh	38	2	33	2	2	0	1	0	2	0
9	FW	(England) ENG	Tom Pope	46	19	41	17	3	2	1	0	1	0
10	MF	(England) ENG	David Worrall	44	4	40	4	3	0	0	0	1	0
11	MF	(Colombia) COL	Cristian Montaño	35	6	30	4	2	0	0	0	3	2
12	GK	(England) ENG	Sam Hornby	12	0	11	0	0	0	1	0	0	0
14	FW	(England) ENG	Tyrone Barnett	28	2	25	1	1	0	0	0	2	1
15	FW	(England) ENG	Anton Forrester	17	3	13	2	2	0	1	0	1	1
18	MF	(Wales) WAL	Billy Reeves	8	1	3	0	1	0	1	0	3	1
19	FW	(England) ENG	Dan Turner	23	3	17	3	1	0	1	0	4	0
20	DF	(Republic of Ireland) IRL	Graham Kelly	0	0	0	0	0	0	0	0	0	0
21	DF	(England) ENG	James Gibbons	36	0	30	0	3	0	0	0	3	0
22	FW	(England) ENG	Dior Angus	3	1	3	1	0	0	0	0	0	0
23	GK	(England) ENG	Ryan Boot	28	0	22	0	3	0	0	0	3	0
24	DF	(England) ENG	Nathan Smith	54	1	46	1	3	0	1	0	4	0
25	DF	(England) ENG	Charlie Walford	0	0	0	0	0	0	0	0	0	0
26	GK	(England) ENG	Joe Slinn	0	0	0	0	0	0	0	0	0	0
27	DF	(England) ENG	Luke Dennis	0	0	0	0	0	0	0	0	0	0
28	FW	(England) ENG	Donovan Wilson	8	1	8	1	0	0	0	0	0	0
29	MF	(England) ENG	Mike Calveley	3	0	2	0	0	0	0	0	1	0
30	DF	(Netherlands) NED	Kjell Knops	0	0	0	0	0	0	0	0	0	0
31	MF	(England) ENG	Ben Whitfield	39	4	37	4	0	0	0	0	2	0
32	MF	(England) ENG	Michael Tonge	38	4	33	3	2	0	1	1	2	0
33	DF	(England) ENG	Kyle Howkins	10	1	10	1	0	0	0	0	0	0
34	MF	(England) ENG	Luke Hannant	18	1	18	1	0	0	0	0	0	0
35	MF	(England) ENG	Harry Middleton	6	0	6	0	0	0	0	0	0	0
36	MF	(England) ENG	Harry Benns	1	0	1	0	0	0	0	0	0	0
Players who featured but departed the club during the season:
2	DF	(England) ENG	Lawrie Wilson	8	0	7	0	0	0	0	0	1	0
3	DF	(England) ENG	Tyler Denton	21	0	15	0	3	0	0	0	3	0
4	DF	(England) ENG	Tom Anderson	24	0	20	0	3	0	0	0	1	0
16	DF	(England) ENG	Adam Yates	2	0	0	0	0	0	0	0	2	0
17	MF	(England) ENG	Michael Brown	0	0	0	0	0	0	0	0	0	0
17	MF	(England) ENG	Chris Regis	2	1	1	0	0	0	0	0	1	1
22	FW	(England) ENG	Rekeil Pyke	9	0	7	0	0	0	1	0	1	0
28	MF	(France) FRA	Anthony de Freitas	13	0	11	0	0	0	0	0	2	0
33	DF	(Republic of Ireland) IRL	Gavin Gunning	27	1	19	0	3	1	1	0	4	0
34	MF	(England) ENG	Jack Stobbs	8	0	5	0	1	0	0	0	2	0
36	GK	(Netherlands) NED	Kelle Roos	9	0	8	0	0	0	0	0	1	0
37	GK	(Bulgaria) BUL	Dimitar Evtimov	1	0	1	0	0	0	0	0	0	0

=== Top scorers ===
Place	Position	Nation	Number	Name	EFL League Two	FA Cup	EFL Cup	EFL Trophy	Total
1	FW	England	9	Tom Pope	17	2	0	0	19
2	MF	Colombia	11	Cristian Montaño	4	0	0	2	6
3	DF	England	6	Antony Kay	3	1	0	0	4
–	MF	England	32	Michael Tonge	3	0	1	0	4
–	MF	England	31	Ben Whitfield	4	0	0	0	4
–	MF	England	10	David Worrall	4	0	0	0	4
7	FW	England	15	Anton Forrester	2	0	0	1	3
–	FW	England	19	Dan Turner	3	0	0	0	3
9	FW	England	14	Tyrone Barnett	1	0	0	1	2
–	MF	England	7	Marcus Harness	1	1	0	0	2
–	MF	England	8	Danny Pugh	2	0	0	0	2
12	FW	England	22	Dior Angus	1	0	0	0	1
–	DF	Ireland	33	Gavin Gunning	0	1	0	0	1
–	MF	England	34	Luke Hannant	1	0	0	0	1
–	MF	Wales	18	Billy Reeves	0	0	0	1	1
–	MF	England	17	Chris Regis	0	0	0	1	1
–	DF	England	24	Nathan Smith	1	0	0	0	1
–	FW	England	28	Donovan Wilson	1	0	0	0	1
–	–	–	–	Own goals	1	0	0	0	1
				TOTALS	49	5	1	6	61

=== Disciplinary record ===
Number	Nation	Position	Name	EFL League Two		FA Cup		EFL Cup		EFL Trophy		Total	
Number	Nation	Position	Name	Yellow card	Red card	Yellow card	Red card	Yellow card	Red card	Yellow card	Red card	Yellow card	Red card
21	England	DF	James Gibbons	7	1	1	0	0	0	0	1	8	2
6	England	DF	Antony Kay	11	1	0	0	0	0	1	0	12	1
33	Ireland	DF	Gavin Gunning	4	0	0	0	2	1	1	0	7	1
32	England	MF	Michael Tonge	5	1	0	0	0	0	0	0	5	1
11	Colombia	MF	Cristian Montaño	2	0	0	0	0	0	0	1	2	1
8	England	MF	Danny Pugh	2	1	0	0	0	0	0	0	2	1
9	England	FW	Tom Pope	6	0	0	0	1	0	1	0	8	0
10	England	MF	David Worrall	7	0	0	0	0	0	0	0	7	0
34	England	MF	Luke Hannant	5	0	0	0	0	0	0	0	5	0
4	England	DF	Tom Anderson	4	0	0	0	0	0	0	0	4	0
5	England	DF	Joe Davis	4	0	0	0	0	0	0	0	4	0
7	England	MF	Marcus Harness	2	0	1	0	0	0	1	0	4	0
33	England	DF	Kyle Howkins	3	0	0	0	0	0	0	0	3	0
31	England	MF	Ben Whitfield	2	0	0	0	0	0	1	0	3	0
3	England	DF	Tyler Denton	0	0	1	0	0	0	1	0	2	0
15	England	FW	Anton Forrester	2	0	0	0	0	0	0	0	2	0
35	England	MF	Harry Middleton	2	0	0	0	0	0	0	0	2	0
4	England	DF	Charlie Raglan	2	0	0	0	0	0	0	0	2	0
24	England	DF	Nathan Smith	2	0	0	0	0	0	0	0	2	0
28	France	MF	Anthony de Freitas	1	0	0	0	0	0	0	0	1	0
18	Wales	MF	Billy Reeves	1	0	0	0	0	0	0	0	1	0
19	England	MF	Dan Turner	1	0	0	0	0	0	0	0	1	0
			TOTALS	75	4	3	0	3	1	6	2	87	7

Sourced from Soccerway.

== Awards ==
National Awards	Winner
EFL League Two Player of the Month	Tom Pope (October 2017)
End of Season Awards	Winner
Player of the Year	Tom Pope
Away Travel Player of the Year	Tom Pope
Supporters' Club's Trophy	Tom Pope
Players' Player of the Year	Tom Pope
Young Player of the Year	James Gibbons
Community Foundation Trust Player of the Year	Adam Yates
Youth Player of the Year	Harry Benns
Goal of the Season	Antony Kay (vs Crewe Alexandra, 2 April 2018)

== Transfers ==
=== Transfers in ===
Date from	Position	Nationality	Name	From	Fee	Ref.
1 July 2017 (Note: The transfer was announced on 21 June and would become official on 1 July once his contract at Fleetwood Town expired)	CB	ENG	Joe Davis	Fleetwood Town	Free transfer	
1 July 2017 (Note: The transfer was announced on 21 June and would become official on 1 July once his contract at Burton Albion expired)	GK	ENG	Sam Hornby	Burton Albion	Free transfer	
1 July 2017 (Note: The transfer was announced on 28 June and would become official on 1 July once his contract at Bury expired)	CB	ENG	Antony Kay	Bury	Free transfer	
1 July 2017 (Note: The transfer was announced on 22 June and would become official on 1 July once his contract at Sheffield United expired)	LB	IRL	Graham Kelly	Sheffield United	Free transfer	
1 July 2017 (Note: The transfer was announced on 20 June and would become official on 1 July once his contract at Bury expired)	GK	ENG	Rob Lainton	Bury	Free transfer	
1 July 2017 (Note: The transfer was announced on 20 June and would become official on 1 July once his contract at Bristol Rovers expired)	LM	COL	Cristian Montaño	Bristol Rovers	Free transfer	
1 July 2017 (Note: The transfer was announced on 18 May and would become official on 1 July once his contract at Bury expired)	CF	ENG	Tom Pope	Bury	Free transfer	
6 July 2017	CF	ENG	Tyrone Barnett	AFC Wimbledon	Free transfer	
15 July 2017	RB	ENG	Lawrie Wilson	Bolton Wanderers	Free transfer	
28 July 2017	CB	IRL	Gavin Gunning	Grimsby Town	Free transfer	
4 August 2017	CM	ENG	Michael Tonge	Stevenage	Free transfer	
24 August 2017	RM	ENG	David Worrall	Millwall	Free transfer	
31 August 2017	CM	ENG	Harry Middleton	Doncaster Rovers	Free transfer	
7 November 2017	CM	ENG	Chris Regis	Sittingbourne	Free transfer	
1 January 2018	CF	ENG	Dior Angus	Redditch United	Free transfer	
18 January 2018	CM	ENG	Luke Hannant	Gateshead	£10,000	
31 January 2018	CB	ENG	Callum Howe	Lincoln City	Undisclosed	

=== Transfers out ===
Date from	Position	Nationality	Name	To	Fee	Ref.
16 September 2017	CM	ENG	Michael Brown	Sacked		
1 January 2018	CB	IRL	Gavin Gunning	Forest Green Rovers	Contract expired	
9 January 2018	RB	ENG	Lawrie Wilson	Ebbsfleet United	Mutual consent	
11 January 2018	CM	FRA	Anthony de Freitas	(Switzerland) La Chaux-de-Fonds	Mutual consent	
27 March 2018	RB	ENG	Adam Yates	Retired		
12 April 2018	CM	ENG	Chris Regis	Torquay United	Released	
8 May 2018	GK	ENG	Ryan Boot	Solihull Moors	Released	
8 May 2018	CB	ENG	Luke Dennis	Newcastle Town	Released	
8 May 2018	CF	ENG	Anton Forrester	Radcliffe	Released	
8 May 2018	LB	IRL	Graham Kelly	(Northern Ireland) Larne	Released	
8 May 2018	CB	NED	Kjell Knops	(Netherlands) Helmond Sport	Released	
8 May 2018	CM	ENG	Harry Middleton	Alfreton Town	Released	
8 May 2018	CM	WAL	Billy Reeves	Stafford Rangers	Released	
8 May 2018	GK	ENG	Joe Slinn	Walsall	Released	
8 May 2018	LB	ENG	Charlie Walford	Leek Town	Released	
7 June 2018	CB	ENG	Callum Howe	Harrogate Town	'small fee'	

=== Loans in ===
Date from	Position	Nationality	Name	From	Date until	Ref.
11 July 2017	CF	ENG	Rekeil Pyke	Huddersfield Town	2 January 2018	
18 July 2017	RW	ENG	Marcus Harness	Burton Albion	End of season	
4 August 2017	RW	ENG	Ben Whitfield	AFC Bournemouth	End of season	
4 August 2017	LB	ENG	Tyler Denton	Leeds United	3 January 2018	
17 August 2017	RW	ENG	Jack Stobbs	Sheffield Wednesday	2 January 2018	
31 August 2017	CB	ENG	Tom Anderson	Burnley	29 January 2018	
16 September 2017	GK	NED	Kelle Roos	Derby County	28 October 2017	
28 October 2017	GK	BUL	Dimitar Evtimov	Nottingham Forest	31 October 2017	
11 January 2018	CF	ENG	Donovan Wilson	Wolverhampton Wanderers	End of season	
19 January 2018	CB	ENG	Zak Jules	Shrewsbury Town	End of season	
30 January 2018	CB	ENG	Charlie Raglan	Oxford United	End of season	
31 January 2018	CB	ENG	Kyle Howkins	West Bromwich Albion	End of season	

=== Loans out ===
Date from	Position	Nationality	Name	To	Date until	Ref.
5 August 2017	RB	ENG	Adam Yates	Macclesfield Town	3 September 2017	
11 August 2017	GK	ENG	Joe Slinn	Stalybridge Celtic	6 December 2017	
25 August 2017	CB	ENG	Luke Dennis	Newcastle Town	End of season	
13 September 2017	CM	ENG	Mike Calveley	Leek Town	6 November 2017	
8 September 2017	LB	IRL	Graham Kelly	Bradford Park Avenue	21 November 2017	
2 October 2017	LB	ENG	Charlie Walford	Romulus	6 November 2017	
11 November 2017	CM	ENG	Harry Middleton	FC Halifax Town	11 December 2017	
7 December 2017	GK	ENG	Sam Hornby	Chester	26 February 2018	
17 January 2018	CF	ENG	Dan Turner	Tamworth	17 February 2018	
26 January 2018	LB	IRL	Graham Kelly	Southport	End of season	
22 March 2018	CF	ENG	Dior Angus	Tamworth	24 April 2018	
