= Graham Kelly (footballer, born 1997) =

Irish footballer

Personal information
- Date of birth: 16 October 1997 (age 29)
- Place of birth: Dublin, Republic of Ireland
- Height: 1.83 m (6 ft 0 in)
- Position: Left-back

Team information
- Current team: Crusaders

Youth career
- 2014–2015: Sheffield United

Senior career*
Years	Team	Apps	(Gls)
2015–2017	Sheffield United	1	(0)
2016	→ Stalybridge Celtic (loan)	9	(0)
2017–2018	Port Vale	0	(0)
2017	→ Bradford Park Avenue (loan)	10	(1)
2018	→ Southport (loan)	11	(0)
2018–2023	Larne (Note: League statistics for Larne in the 2018–19 campaign not known.)	93	(1)
2023–2026	Coleraine	36	(0)
2026–	Crusaders	0	(0)

International career
2014–2015	Republic of Ireland U18	4	(0)
2015	Republic of Ireland U19	4	(1)
- * Club domestic league appearances and goals as of 22:54, 26 April 2026 (UTC)

Graham Kelly (born 16 October 1997) is an Irish professional footballer who plays as a centre-back for NIFL Premiership club Crusaders. He has represented the Republic of Ireland at under-18 and under-19 level.

Kelly began his career at Sheffield United, where he made his senior debut in April 2016. He played on loan at Stalybridge Celtic later in the year, before he was transferred to Port Vale in June 2017. He played on loan at Bradford Park Avenue and Southport during the 2017–18 season. He joined Northern Irish side Larne in August 2018 and helped the club to win the NIFL Premiership, NIFL Championship, and three County Antrim Shields. He joined Coleraine in June 2023 where he spent three seasons before joining Crusaders in June 2026.

== Club career ==
=== Sheffield United ===
Kelly came through the Academy at Sheffield United to make his senior debut for the "Blades" as a late substitute for Matt Done in a 3–1 defeat to Coventry City at the Ricoh Arena on 30 April 2016. He joined Stalybridge Celtic of the National League North on loan in August 2016. He made ten appearances for the "Celts" over a five-week stay at Bower Fold.

=== Port Vale ===
Kelly signed a one-year contract, with the option for a second year, at newly relegated EFL League Two club Port Vale in June 2017. He said he was looking forward to working with manager Michael Brown and being reunited with former Sheffield United coach Chris Morgan. On 8 September 2017, he joined National League North side Bradford Park Avenue on a one-month loan after manager Mark Bower needed cover for the injured Shane Killock, Matt Hill and Luca Havern. He scored his first goal in senior football in his final appearance for Avenue, after combining well with Oli Johnson in a 2–0 win over Brackley Town at the Horsfall Stadium. On 26 January 2018, he joined Kevin Davies's National League North side Southport on loan until the end of the 2017–18 season. He recovered from a car accident on the M6 motorway to make a total of 11 appearances for the "Sandgrounders". Upon his return to Vale Park he was informed by manager Neil Aspin that he would not be retained beyond the summer.

=== Larne ===
On 2 August 2018, Kelly joined NIFL Championship side Larne. He established himself in the side as a left-sided centre-back in the club's favoured three at the back formation, as Larne went on to win the 2018–19 NIFL Championship. He made 27 appearances before the 2019–20 season was ended early due to the COVID-19 pandemic in Northern Ireland. On 2 December 2020, he played in the County Antrim Shield as Larne held Glentoran to a 0–0 draw and then won the resulting penalty shoot-out 4–3 to win the club its first major trophy in 33 years. He scored his first goal for the club on 11 December, "a stunning curler into the top corner" in a 3–1 win over Linfield at Inver Park. He made 20 appearances in the 2020–21 campaign, helping Larne to finish in a UEFA Europa Conference League qualification place. He signed a contract extension to keep him at the club until 2023. Larne retained their County Antrim Shield title with a 1–0 win over Linfield. He played 30 games in the 2021–22 season, including the 4–2 win over Glentoran at The Oval in the final of the UEFA Europa Conference League play-offs. A third-successive County Antrim Shield title was secured with a penalty shoot-out victory over Linfield. Larne won the first Irish League title of their 134-year history in the 2022–23 season. He left the club at the expiry of his contract to find first-team football elsewhere.

=== Coleraine ===
Kelly signed a three-year deal with Coleraine on 14 June 2023. On 7 November, he took penalties in a 44 kick long penalty shoot-out with Ballymena United, which Coleraine won 18–17. He played 33 games in the 2023–24 season. He signed a new contract in June 2024. He missed most of the 2024–25 season with a long-term injury. He did not feature in the 2025–26 season.

=== Crusaders ===
Kelly joined Crusaders on 15 June 2026.

== International career ==
Kelly won four caps for the Republic of Ireland at both under-18 and under-19 level, and scored for the under-19s against Latvia in November 2015.

== Career statistics ==
As of end of the 2025–26 season

Appearances and goals by club, season and competition
Club	Season	League			National cup (Note: Includes FA Cup, Irish Cup)		League cup (Note: Includes Football League Cup, Northern Ireland Football League Cup)		Other		Total	
Club	Season	Division	Apps	Goals	Apps	Goals	Apps	Goals	Apps	Goals	Apps	Goals
Sheffield United	2015–16	League One	1	0	0	0	0	0	0	0	1	0
Sheffield United	2016–17	League One	0	0	0	0	0	0	1 (Note: Appearance in the EFL Trophy)	0	1	0
Sheffield United	Total		1	0	0	0	0	0	1	0	2	0
Stalybridge Celtic (loan)	2016–17	National League North	9	0	1	0	—		0	0	10	0
Port Vale	2017–18	League Two	0	0	0	0	0	0	0	0	0	0
Bradford Park Avenue (loan)	2017–18	National League North	10	1	1	0	—		0	0	11	1
Southport (loan)	2017–18	National League North	11	0	0	0	—		0	0	11	0
Larne	2018–19	NIFL Championship			2	0	0	0	0	0	2	0
Larne	2019–20	NIFL Premiership	25	0	1	0	1	0	0	0	27	0
Larne	2020–21	NIFL Premiership	19	1	1	0	0	0	0	0	20	1
Larne	2021–22	NIFL Premiership	28	0	2	0	0	0	0	0	30	0
Larne	2022–23	NIFL Premiership	21	0	2	0	1	0	0	0	24	0
Larne	Total		93	1	8	0	2	0	0	0	103	1
Coleraine	2023–24	NIFL Premiership	30	0	0	0	2	0	1 (Note: Appearance in the Scottish Challenge Cup)	0	33	0
Coleraine	2024–25	NIFL Premiership	6	0	0	0	0	0	0	0	6	0
Coleraine	2025–26	NIFL Premiership	0	0	0	0	0	0	0	0	0	0
Coleraine	Total		36	0	0	0	2	0	1	0	39	0
Crusaders	2026–27	NIFL Premiership	0	0	0	0	0	0	0	0	0	0
Career total			160	2	10	0	4	0	2	0	176	2

== Honours ==
Larne

- NIFL Championship: 2018–19
- County Antrim Shield (3): 2020–21, 2021–22, 2022–23
- NIFL Premiership: 2022–23
