= Billy Reeves (footballer) =

Welsh footballer (born 1996)

Personal information
- Full name: William David Reeves
- Date of birth: 18 December 1996 (age 29)
- Place of birth: Wrexham, Wales
- Height: 6 ft 0 in (1.83 m)
- Position: Midfielder

Team information
- Current team: Leek Town

Youth career
- Port Vale

Senior career*
Years	Team	Apps	(Gls)
2015–2018	Port Vale	15	(0)
2015–2016	→ Witton Albion (loan)	14	(1)
2016	→ Hyde United (loan)	14	(0)
2016	→ Witton Albion (loan)	4	(0)
2016	→ Witton Albion (loan)	2	(0)
2017	→ Stafford Rangers (loan)	4	(0)
2018	Stafford Rangers		
2018–2023	Leek Town	142	(11)
2023	Bootle	7	(0)
2023–2024	Bury	27	(2)
2024–	Leek Town (Note: Statistics for the 2025–26 season not known.)	34	(0)
- * Club domestic league appearances and goals as of 18:22, 1 May 2026 (UTC)

William David Reeves (born 18 December 1996) is a Welsh semi-professional footballer who plays as a midfielder for Northern Premier League Premier Division club Leek Town.

Reeves began his career at Port Vale in April 2015 and later went out on loan to Witton Albion, Hyde United and Stafford Rangers. He was released by Port Vale in May 2018 and joined Leek Town via Stafford Rangers later in the year. He spent five years with Leek before joining Bury via Bootle in 2023. He returned to Leek Town in the summer of 2024.

== Career ==
=== Port Vale ===
Reeves graduated through the Port Vale Academy to sign professional forms in April 2015. He joined Northern Premier League Division One North side Witton Albion on a one-month loan in November 2015. His loan was extended after he established himself in the first-team and he went on to make 14 appearances, scoring one goal in a 5–0 win over Harrogate Railway Athletic on 2 January. He then joined Hyde United on a one-month loan in February 2016. He also made 14 appearances for Hyde, as the club were relegated out of the Northern Premier League Premier Division.

On 16 September 2016, he returned to Witton Albion – now playing in the Northern Premier League Division One South – on a 28-day loan. He returned to Witton Albion on loan in mid-November, but played just two games before being sidelined with injury. He joined Stafford Rangers of the Northern Premier League Premier Division on a 28-day loan on 3 February 2017. He made his EFL League One debut for Port Vale after coming on as a 47th-minute substitute for Danny Pugh in a 1–1 draw with Southend United at Roots Hall on 4 March. After two further substitute appearances that month he thanked central midfield partner Sam Foley and caretaker manager Michael Brown for helping him to adapt to League One football. He went on to feature in 12 of the club's final 14 games of the 2016–17 relegation campaign, and signed a new one-year contract in May 2017.

On 7 November 2017, he scored his first goal in professional football in a 4–2 victory over Crewe Alexandra in an EFL Trophy group stage match at Vale Park. However, he featured just eight times for the "Valiants" during the 2017–18 campaign. He was not retained by new manager Neil Aspin in May 2018.

=== Non-League ===
On 14 August 2018, Reeves joined Stafford Rangers on a short-term contract. On 25 September 2018, he moved on to Northern Premier League Division One West club Leek Town after manager Neil Baker lost six players to injury. The "Blues" reached the play-offs at the end of the 2018–19 season, but lost 2–1 to Radcliffe in the final. The 2019–20 season was formally abandoned due to the COVID-19 pandemic in England, with no promotions taking place despite Leek sitting top of the Division One South East table. He featured eleven times in the 2020–21 campaign, and was sent off in a 1–0 defeat at Kidsgrove Athletic, before the season was curtailed early due to the ongoing pandemic. He made 43 appearances in the 2021–22 season. Leek were beaten 4–1 by Runcorn Linnets in the play-off semi-finals. He featured 47 times in the 2022–23 campaign as Leek finished second in the league; his goal tally of seven included a hat-trick of penalties in a 4–1 win over Prescot Cables on 20 September. Leek again were beaten at home by Runcorn Linnets in the semi-finals of the play-offs, this time losing 3–1.

Reeves joined Northern Premier League Division One West club Bootle in May 2023. However, he decided to leave the club five months later following the departure of manager Dave McNabb. He subsequently signed with Bury in the North West Counties League Premier Division. He featured 28 times in the remainder of the 2023–24 season.

Reeves rejected a new contract offer at Bury and returned to Leek Town in June 2024. He featured 36 times across the 2024–25 campaign. He made his 250th club appearance for Leek in January 2026.

== Style of play ==
The Port Vale website described Reeves as an "energetic technical midfielder".

== Career statistics ==
As of end of the 2025–26 season

Appearances and goals by club, season and competition
Club	Season	League			FA Cup		League Cup		Other		Total	
Club	Season	Division	Apps	Goals	Apps	Goals	Apps	Goals	Apps	Goals	Apps	Goals
Port Vale	2015–16	League One	0	0	0	0	0	0	0	0	0	0
Port Vale	2016–17	EFL League One	12	0	0	0	0	0	0	0	12	0
Port Vale	2017–18	EFL League Two	3	0	1	0	1	0	3 (Note: Appearance(s) in the EFL Trophy.)	1	8	1
Port Vale	Total		15	0	1	0	1	0	3	1	20	1
Witton Albion (loan)	2015–16	Northern Premier League; Division One North	14	1	0	0	—		0	0	14	1
Hyde United (loan)	2015–16	Northern Premier League; Premier Division	14	0	0	0	—		0	0	14	0
Witton Albion (loan)	2016–17	Northern Premier League; Division One South	6	0	2	0	—		1 (Note: Appearance(s) in the FA Trophy.)	0	9	0
Leek Town	2018–19	Northern Premier League; Division One West	33	1	1	0	—		8 (Note: 4 appearances in the FA Trophy, 1 appearance in the Staffordshire Senior Cup, 1 appearance in the Integro Cup, and 2 appearances in the play-offs.)	0	42	1
Leek Town	2019–20	Northern Premier League; Division One South East	28	2	4	0	—		5 (Note: 3 appearances in the FA Trophy, 1 appearance in the Staffordshire Senior Cup and 1 appearance in the Integro Cup.)	0	37	2
Leek Town	2020–21	Northern Premier League; Division One South East	7	0	2	0	—		2	0	11	0
Leek Town	2021–22	Northern Premier League; Division One West	37	2	2	0	—		6 (Note: 2 appearances in the FA Trophy, 3 appearances in the Staffordshire Senior Cup and 1 appearance in the play-offs.)	0	45	2
Leek Town	2022–23	Northern Premier League; Division One West	37	6	1	0	—		9 (Note: 4 appearances and 1 goal in the FA Trophy, 4 appearances and 1 goal in the Staffordshire Senior Cup and 1 appearance in the play-offs.)	2	47	8
Leek Town	Total		142	11	10	0	0	0	30	2	182	13
Bootle	2023–24	Northern Premier League; Division One West	7	0	1	0	—		3	0	11	0
Bury	2023–24	North West Counties League; Premier Division	27	2	0	0	—		1 (Note: Appearance(s) in the FA Vase.)	0	28	2
Leek Town	2024–25	Northern Premier League; Premier Division	34	0	1	0	—		1 (Note: Appearance(s) in the Staffordshire Senior Cup.)	0	36	0
Leek Town	2025–26	Northern Premier League; Premier Division										
Leek Town	2026–27	Northern Premier League; Premier Division	0	0	0	0	—		0	0	0	0
Leek Town	Total		34	0	1	0	0	0	1	0	36	0
Career total (Note: Full statistics for Stafford Rangers not recorded.)			259	14	15	0	1	0	39	3	314	17
