= Tom Pope =

English footballer (born 1985)

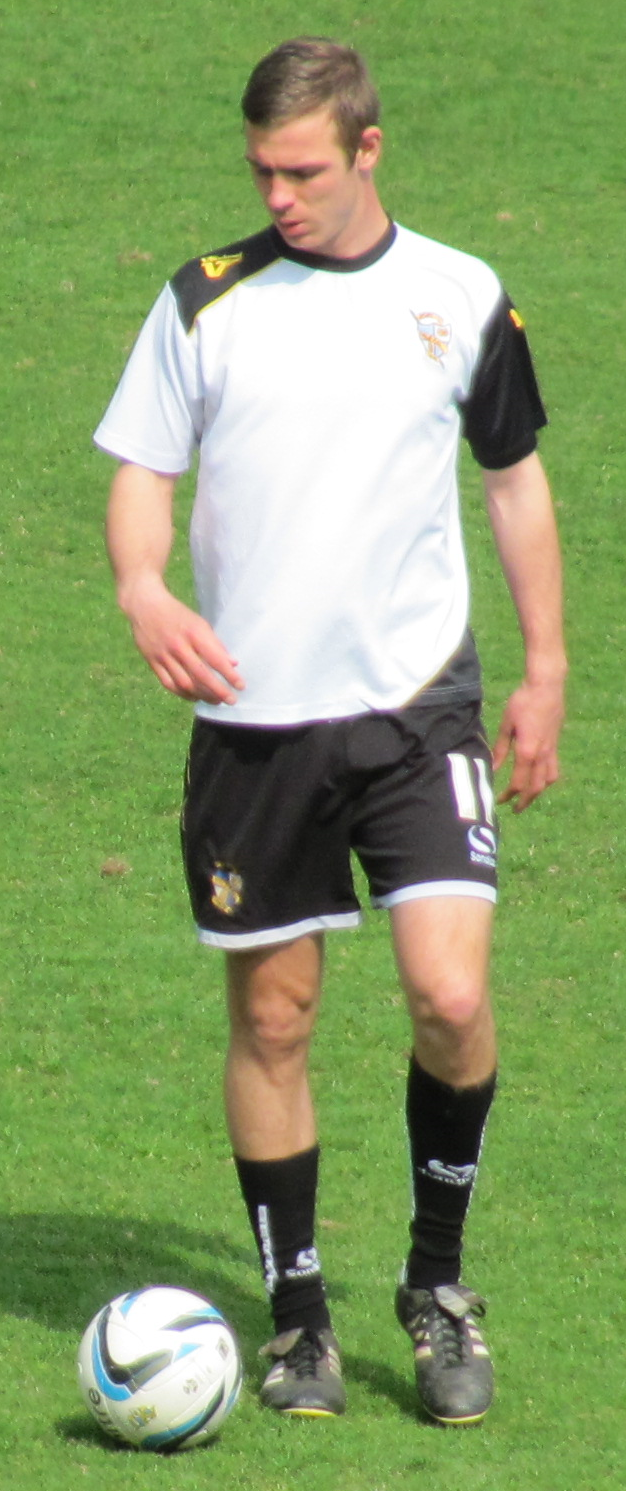
- Pope warming up for Port Vale in 2013

Personal information
- Full name: Thomas John Pope
- Date of birth: 27 August 1985 (age 41)
- Place of birth: Stoke-on-Trent, England
- Height: 6 ft 3 in (1.91 m)
- Position: Centre forward

Youth career
- Crewe Alexandra
- Hanley Town

Senior career*
Years	Team	Apps	(Gls)
2004–2005	Biddulph Victoria		
2005–2009	Crewe Alexandra	56	(17)
2005	→ Lancaster City (loan)		
2006	→ Stafford Rangers (loan)		
2006	→ Barrow (loan)		
2009–2011	Rotherham United	53	(4)
2011	→ Port Vale (loan)	13	(3)
2011–2015	Port Vale	163	(56)
2015–2017	Bury	73	(10)
2017–2021	Port Vale	130	(37)
2021–2023	Congleton Town	75	(35)
2023–2024	Witton Albion	23	(6)
2024	Hanley Town	11	(1)
2024–2026	Kidsgrove Athletic (Note: Statistics for the 2025–26 season not known.)	23+	(5+)
Total		620	(174)

Managerial career
- 2025–2026: Kidsgrove Athletic (joint manager)
- * Club domestic league appearances and goals

Thomas John Pope (born 27 August 1985) is an English former professional footballer and manager. As a player, he was a centre forward, scoring over 216 goals in over 721 games.

A Crewe Alexandra Academy graduate, he turned professional with the club in 2005 after impressing at non-League side Biddulph Victoria in 2004–05. He was loaned out to Conference North sides Lancaster City and Stafford Rangers in 2005–06, before he spent 2006–07 on loan at Barrow, also of the Conference North. He established himself in the Crewe first-team picture in 2007–08 before becoming the club's top scorer in 2008–09 with ten League One goals. He became Rotherham United's joint-record signing when he made a £150,000 move to the Yorkshire club in June 2009. He scored five goals in the 2009–10 campaign before he was loaned out to Port Vale in January 2011.

The loan was made permanent in time for the start of the 2011–12 season. He scored 33 goals and was voted League Two Player of the Year as he helped the club to secure promotion out of League Two in 2012–13. He was voted Port Vale's Player of the Year in 2013 and 2014. He signed with Bury in June 2015 and remained with the club for two seasons before rejoining Port Vale. He claimed the club's Player of the Year award for a record third time in 2018, and the following year, he became the second-highest goalscorer in the club's history. He scored 115 goals in 343 league and cup appearances before leaving the club in May 2021. He was released at the end of the 2020–21 season and went on to play for Congleton Town. He captained Congleton to a Cheshire Senior Cup and NWCL Challenge Cup double in 2023. He moved on to Witton Albion in July 2023 and won the Mid Cheshire District FA Senior with the club in his first season. He rejoined Hanley Town in May 2024 and moved on to Kidsgrove Athletic five months later. He managed Kidsgrove from February 2025 to August 2026.

== Career ==
=== Crewe Alexandra ===
Pope was a part of Crewe Alexandra Youth Academy, but was not offered a professional contract with the club. He instead was forced to make his name in the Midland Football Alliance with Biddulph Victoria after coming through the Hanley Town under-18 side to find first-team football. He also played Sunday league football for Sneyd. He scored four goals for the club as they beat the Butcher's Arms 6–4 in the 2004 final of the Potteries and District Sunday League Cup final. During this time the teenager found work as a window-fitter. He scored 15 goals in his first season with Biddulph, and added a further twelve to his tally before returning to Crewe as a professional in October 2005 — manager Dario Gradi now convinced of Pope's potential. Pope chose to head to Crewe after two unsuccessful trials with boyhood club Port Vale.

Pope spent much of the 2005–06 season in the Conference North, playing on loan for Lancaster City and then Stafford Rangers. He returned to the Conference North in 2006–07 with Barrow, again on loan, after Lancaster manager Phil Wilson moved on to Holker Street. On 10 March 2007, Pope made his debut for Crewe in a 1–0 defeat to Gillingham at the Priestfield Stadium, replacing Gary Roberts on 86 minutes. He made three further appearances from the bench during the rest of the season, all three games ending in defeat.

He scored his first goal for the club against Bristol Rovers on 18 August 2007, in a 1–1 draw at the Memorial Stadium. He established himself in the Alex first-team in 2007–08, and his seven goals put him as the club's second-highest scorer after Nicky Maynard.

He signed a two-year contract extension in November 2008, keeping him at the "Alex" until summer 2011. He believed the players could win round disgruntled Crewe fans, and blamed the players for Steve Holland's sacking. He bettered his goal tally in 2008–09 and became the club's top scorer with ten goals. However, this was not enough to prevent Crewe from suffering relegation out of League One. His ten league goals reflected good value for his 17 league starts and an additional nine appearances from the bench. This achievement came despite criticism from assistant manager Neil Baker that Pope lacked consistency on the pitch and professionalism off the pitch. In all he scored 17 goals in 64 games for the Crewe, and he remained thankful to the club, the fans and former manager Dario Gradi for rescuing his career, despite his falling out with then-manager Guðjón Þórðarson.

"No one at Crewe ever told me if I was doing a decent job. They told me the things I did wrong, but they never gave me any chance to build my confidence or give me any encouragement. It started to get me down towards the end, it was frustrating but that's football. I wanted a new challenge and I've got one at Rotherham."

— Pope was sometimes frustrated during his time at Gresty Road.

=== Rotherham United ===
In June 2009, Pope joined League Two club Rotherham United for a joint-club-record fee of £150,000, signing a three-year contract with the club. Impressing in the pre-season games, his first two goals for Rotherham came in a League Cup second round tie with West Bromwich Albion at The Hawthorns on 26 August. However, manager Mark Robins departed in September, and in his absence Pope went on to score only three league goals in 35 appearances in 2009–10, and did not feature in the "Millers"' defeat in the play-off final due to a metatarsal injury.

=== Port Vale ===
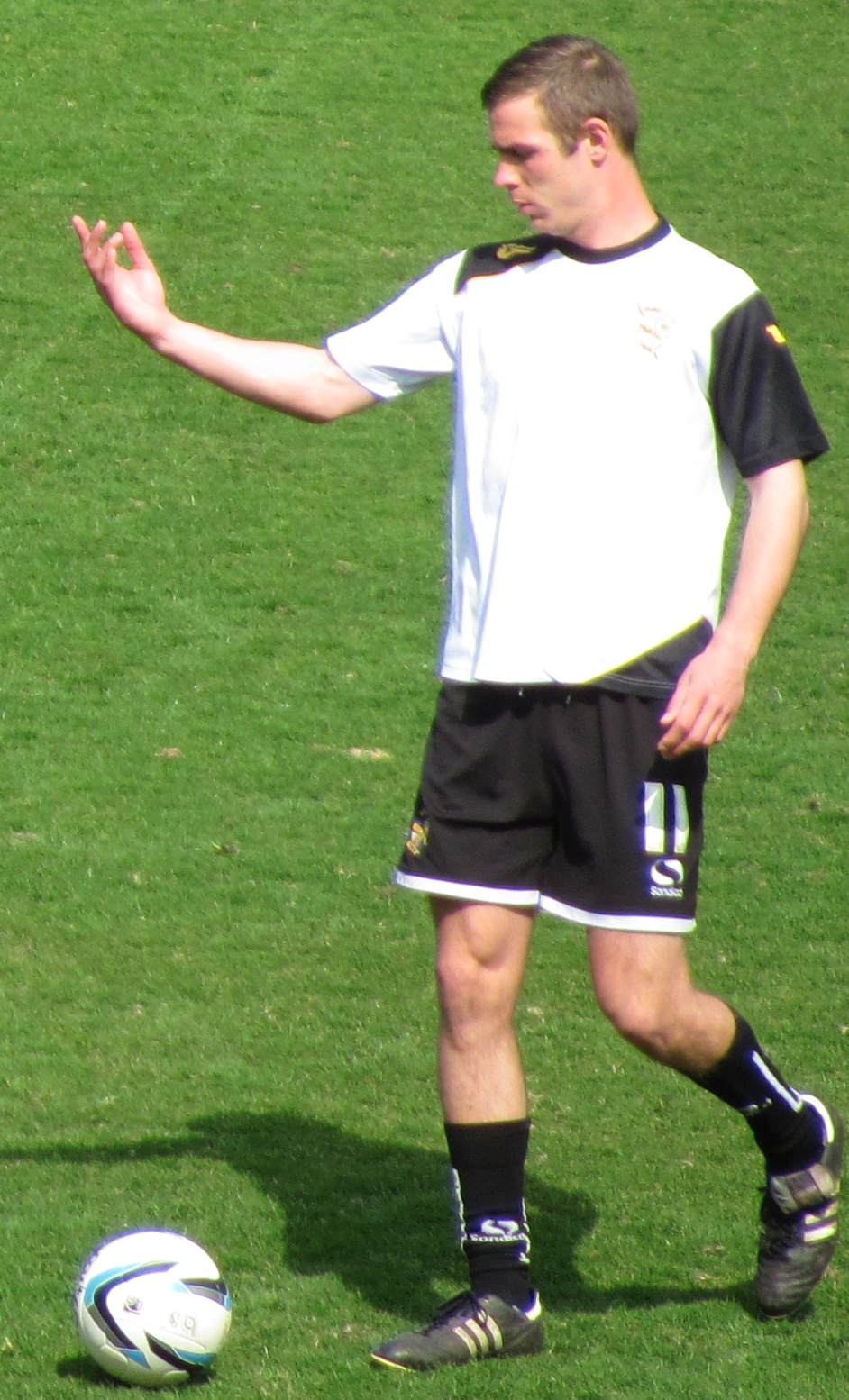
Pope warming up for Port Vale in 2013

Pope did not hit scoring form at the start of the 2010–11 season, and numerous other League Two clubs expressed an interest in acquiring the player permanently, as Ronnie Moore was willing to sell Pope to the highest bidder. Jim Gannon found top-scorer Marc Richards out injured, and so Pope finally achieved his dream of playing for the club he supported all his life, when he joined Port Vale on a month-long loan starting on 28 January 2011.

He missed a penalty in his second appearance for the club, but in the next game he made his first full start and won a penalty – which Justin Richards converted. He scored both of the club's goals in his fourth game, a 2–1 win over Bradford City at Vale Park, which was broadcast live on Sky Sports. This final man-of-the-match winning performance was enough to convince Gannon to 'fight tooth and nail' to keep Pope at the club beyond the initial month long spell. Indeed, his loan spell was extended into a second month. His third goal for the club came on 22 March and was enough to rescue a point at home to Hereford United for caretaker manager Mark Grew. Following this his loan deal was extended into a third month. However, the loan spell was terminated three weeks early following a change of circumstances – parent club Rotherham had dropped out of the play-offs and manager Ronnie Moore had departed. Pope remained hopeful of a permanent switch in the summer, and a move away from the Don Valley Stadium seemed inevitable after new manager Andy Scott omitted him from United's pre-season tour of Portugal. He got his wish in August, as he switched to Port Vale on a free transfer. He signed a one-year deal with the "Valiants" despite more lucrative two-year offers from Morecambe and Mansfield Town, as well as interest from Macclesfield Town.

He went straight into manager Micky Adams' first team for the start of the 2011–12 season. He scored twice in his opening ten games, including a headed winning goal against Bradford City, which took the Vale into the automatic promotion places in mid-September; however, after the match he was still forced to respond to criticism levelled at him from a minority of fans. Adams added that "Tom shouldn't listen to the supporters – with the greatest of respect to them". Pope added to his tally with the equalizing goal in a 1–1 draw with Vale's local rivals, and his former club, Crewe Alexandra on 24 September. Though he only hit four goals in his first 25 games of the season, he picked up a hat-trick of assists in the 4–0 win over Aldershot Town on 17 December. He ended a run of 15 games without a goal by coming off the bench to net a late winner at home to Plymouth Argyle on 28 January; the strike was his first goal of the season not to come from his head. However, the following month he picked up a groin injury and was forced to undergo 'hernia-related' surgery. He agreed to sign a new one-year deal with the club in June 2012, though assistant manager Mark Grew warned him to improve his scoring tally. Pope repeatedly stated to the local press that he was determined to improve his goals tally.

"I've made no secret of my desire to stay and I'm really pleased we have come to an agreement on a new deal. I know people have been talking about my goal tally this season but I think that's down to the style we play and how all of the players work for each other. The gaffer has put a lot of faith in me and I'm really pleased I have been able to repay that faith by committing to the club for a further term."

— Speaking after signing a new two-and-a-half-year contract, Pope remained humble despite his impressive goal tally.

Pope had a quietly consistent start to the 2012–13 season before hitting four goals in a 6–2 home win over former club Rotherham on 8 September. He was quoted as saying that this was the best game of his career, as he proved a point to his detractors at former club Rotherham. A brace in a 2–0 win over Exeter City at St James Park on 6 October took him to 11 goals in 13 games; this meant that, with the season only a quarter of the way in, the 27-year-old had reached his best goal tally. It also made him the fastest Vale player to reach double figures since Tom Nolan hit ten goals within the first XI games of the 1933–34 season. Pope was quick to credit wing duo Jennison Myrie-Williams and Ashley Vincent for supplying him with the chances he needed to find the net so frequently. His seven goals in seven games saw him named as League Two Player of the Month for September 2012. Fans at Vale Park began to chant "Feed the Pope and he will score" throughout matches, and he picked up the nickname of the "Sneyd Green Sniper / Assassin", in reference to his hometown. A hat-trick in a 4–0 win over Bristol Rovers on 20 November meant that he became the quickest player to reach 20 goals (from the start of the season) in the club's Football League history. In February, he signed a new contract to keep him at the club until summer 2015. The next month he was named as League Two's Player of the Year after leading the division's scoring charts by five goals despite hitting an 11-game goal drought. After winning the award he claimed his third hat-trick of the season on 29 March, as Vale beat promotion rivals Cheltenham Town 3–2. Vale secured promotion with a third-place finish at the end of the season, and Pope finished on 33 goals in 51 games. He was voted onto the PFA Team of the Year, alongside teammate Jennison Myrie-Williams. He was further voted as Port Vale's Player of the Year.

Pope was dropped from the starting line-up on 22 October 2013, ending a run of 66 consecutive league starts for the club, but marked his appearance from the bench in the following game to take Vale to within two points of the League One play-offs by the end of the month. He continued to hold down a first-team starting place, and on 6 December he scored his fiftieth goal for Port Vale during a 4–1 FA Cup win over Salisbury City. He ended the 2013–14 campaign as the club's top-scorer with 16 goals in 51 appearances. The club secured a ninth-place finish in League One, and Pope became the first player in the club's history to win the club's Player of the Year award in successive years.

He opened the 2014–15 campaign by scoring in each of the season's first four games. After Rob Page took over as caretaker manager in September, Pope said that he was happy to act as a "battering ram" to help create chances for new signing Jordan Slew. The following month Pope was named as a transfer target by Barnsley manager Danny Wilson, and an unnamed Championship club also had a formal approach to Port Vale turned down. Vale chairman Norman Smurthwaite told him that a new contract offer in the summer would mean a 50% reduction in his wages, despite other clubs indicating they would pay him almost double his current wage. In late October he picked up a knee injury and was ruled out of action for three months after undergoing surgery. He managed to finish as the club's top-scorer for the third-successive season despite admitting that he was not fully fit at any point following his recovery from injury.

=== Bury ===
Pope entered formal talks with Doncaster Rovers in May 2015, before signing a three-year contract with newly promoted League One club Bury. He scored six goals in 33 games in the 2015–16 season before breaking his wrist in February. He continued to play with his wrist in plaster, and also played as a makeshift midfielder after coming on as a substitute against Sheffield United. He ended the 2015–16 campaign with seven goals in 43 appearances, and was made available on a free transfer by manager David Flitcroft in July 2016.

On 8 October 2016, he collided with Peterborough United goalkeeper Luke McGee and was hospitalised with two broken ribs and a punctured lung. He criticised his teammates the following month after Bury went on a 12-game winless run. He returned to action after six weeks out, and defended caretaker manager Chris Brass, saying the team's "downright stupid defending" was down to the players, not the coaches. The team improved after new manager Lee Clark installed a new 5–2–3 formation, and Pope scored seven goals in 40 games as Bury rose clear of the relegation zone at the end of the 2016–17 season.

=== Return to Port Vale ===
Pope signed a two-year contract with Port Vale in May 2017 after agreeing on a settlement with Bury on his contract. Manager Michael Brown was sacked after a poor start to the 2017–18 season, with Pope only scoring one goal in his first 13 appearances. However, he managed to find his form under new manager Neil Aspin, scoring five goals in Aspin's first three games as manager to help Vale to pick up back-to-back wins; this included a brace in a 3–1 win over Cheltenham Town that saw Pope named in the EFL Team of the Week. He went on to be nominated for the League Two Player of the Month award for October, having claimed five goals and one assist in five games. After winning the award, he stated that it "is a reflection on my team mates, how hard they have worked and the chances they have created for me". He was appointed club captain in December. The club turned down a bid of £25,000 from Coventry City during the January transfer window. Speaking at the end of February, Aspin said Pope had been playing through a hernia injury since Christmas and would require an operation to return to anything approaching full fitness. He quickly returned from injury and his total of 19 goals was essential in helping the club to avoid relegation; he finished the campaign as the club's top-scorer and was named Port Vale Player of the Year for a record third time.

On 1 September 2018, Pope scored in a 2–1 home defeat to Newport County to take his tally at the Vale Park ground one clear of Stan Steele to a record 56; after the game Pope said that "I would rather not have scored and have got the three points [and] I would give up any individual award and any record for another promotion. It's a team game, not an individual sport". In December he signed a new two-year contract to keep him tied to the club until summer 2021. On 12 January, he picked up a hamstring injury during a 3–0 home loss to Colchester United. He was ruled out of action for 'a few weeks'. On 30 March, he scored the winning goal in a 2–1 victory over Northampton Town, and in doing so became only the third player (after Wilf Kirkham and Martin Foyle) to score 100 goals for the club. He finished as the club's top-scorer for the fifth time for the 2018–19 season, and was named as that year's PFA Community Champion at the club's end of the year awards.

New manager John Askey confirmed that Pope would continue as club captain in July 2019. He was mainly used as a substitute at the start of the 2019–20 season but started in his 500th game as a professional footballer in a 2–2 home draw with Mansfield Town on 21 September. On having to sit on the bench regularly, he went on to say "it has been the lowest point of my career really". He scored a brace in a 3–1 home win over Morecambe on 5 October to earn himself a place on the EFL Team of the Week. However, later that month he lost the club captaincy to Leon Legge after being increasingly started from the substitute's bench. On 30 November, Pope scored an eight-minute hat-trick to secure a 3–1 victory over Cheltenham Town in the FA Cup second round. In the following round he scored his 109th Port Vale goal, making him the outright second-highest goalscorer in the club's history (behind Wilf Kirkham), in a 4–1 defeat to Premier League champions Manchester City on 4 January. This was later named as Port Vale's goal of the season. He had previously criticised Manchester City and England centre-back John Stones on Twitter, saying he'd "get 40 a season" playing against Stones every week, and after the game tweeted that "I was completely wrong and bang out of order to say I'd score 40 a season..... it's more like 50." The following month he was named in Port Vale's best XI of the 2010s by local newspaper The Sentinel. On 5 January, he tweeted a World War III prediction that "We invade Iran then Cuba then North Korea then the Rothchilds are crowned champions of every bank on the planet"; the FA concluded that these remarks amounted to Antisemitic canard and handed him a £3,500 fine and a six-game ban to start at the beginning of the 2020–21 season. The club announced that they would appeal the ban, adding that "the Commission did not find that Mr. Pope had been intentionally discriminatory and noted that the FA had not alleged any such intent on his part".

On 12 January 2021, Pope broke his arm after landing awkwardly following a clash of heads in an EFL Trophy tie with Sunderland and played on for the remaining 19 minutes until the full-time whistle as caretaker manager Danny Pugh had already used his allocation of substitutions. He was limited to 23 appearances in the 2020–21 campaign and was released by new manager Darrell Clarke in May 2021, leaving his final tally for the club to stand at 115 goals in 343 first-team appearances.

=== Later career ===
On 21 July 2021, Pope joined North West Counties Premier Division side Congleton Town, linking up with former Port Vale teammate and now Congleton manager Richard Duffy. He got off to an excellent start to his "Bears" career, being named as Premier Division Player of the Month for August after scoring six goals, providing two assists and winning five man of the match awards in six games. He scored 20 goals in 49 appearances throughout the 2021–22 season, collecting ten man of the match awards. He scored 28 goals in 56 games in the 2022–23 campaign, including five from six games in the club's run to the semi-finals of the FA Vase; he won six man of the match awards and was sent off on two occasions. Congleton won the Cheshire Senior Cup by beating Altrincham on penalties and lifted the NWCFL Challenge Cup by defeating Bacup Borough.

Pope signed with Witton Albion of the Northern Premier League Division One West on 7 July 2023. He scored nine goals in 27 games in the 2023–24 season, featuring in the Mid Cheshire District FA Senior Cup final victory over Northwich Victoria. He also had a knee operation funded by the Professional Footballers' Association.

On 20 May 2024, Pope returned to Hanley Town, the club where he began his senior playing career, to work as a player and head of Youth Development. On being asked why he continued to play at a late age despite various injury pains and having to also work as a self-employed labourer, he said "the older pros always told me to play for as long as I could because, once it is gone, you will miss it. So, while I am enjoying it and still able to I will."

On 18 October 2024, Pope joined Hanley's Northern Premier League Division One West rivals Kidsgrove Athletic. He also played Sunday league football for Greenhoffs and Abbey Hulton United. In February 2025, he was appointed joint player-manager alongside Matt Rhead until the end of the 2024–25 season. He scored five goals in 24 games. In March 2026, he received a ten-match ban after being part of a brawl that saw a match at Avro the previous October to be abandoned. He retired as a player at the end of the 2025–26 season. He resigned as Kidsgrove manager "due to footballing reasons" on 30 August 2026 after the team started the season with two defeats and disqualification from the FA Cup.

== Style of play ==
A 6 ft 3 in (1.91 m) centre forward, he has a natural advantage in the air. A target man, he is able to hold the ball up and bring other players into the game. As he said in an interview in September 2011, "I do the nitty-gritty and the dirty stuff." In terms of motivation, he also said that "some players need an arm around the shoulder but a kick up the backside seems to work better for me". His goal tally is not supplemented by penalty kicks, as he converted his first penalty in normal time at the age of 32. He does not possess great pace however.

== Personal life ==
Pope, and two accomplices, were charged with affray for an incident in Hanley on 8 February 2009, and Pope received 200 hours community service and a six-month suspended jail sentence. Pope's defence team claimed that he was provoked when the victims verbally abused and assaulted his girlfriend. In November 2019, January 2020 and July 2020 he was suspended for ten matches and fined a total of £7,600 by The Football Association for "bringing the game into disrepute" in regards to unspecified posts he made on social media, with one Tweet being judged to have been antisemitic.

A native of Stoke-on-Trent, Pope grew up as a Port Vale supporter. He is an accomplished amateur golfer, having reached the quarter-finals of Stoke-on-Trent's Sentinel Shield competition. He wears contact lenses.

Pope and teammate Adam Yates began the 2011–12 season as joint-managers of local amateur Sunday League side Sneyd, fitting their management duties around their professional careers at Vale Park. The pair took the club to the Potteries and District Premier Division title and the final of the Sentinel Sunday Cup in 2012–13. He began writing a column in The Sentinel in 2014. He was inducted into the Stoke-on-Trent Sporting Hall of Fame in November 2021. His was one of four faces painted onto a community mural at Vale Park in December 2025, alongside Roy Sproson, Robbie Earle and John Rudge. In December 2025, supporters voted him onto the all-time Port Vale XI.

== Career statistics ==
Appearances and goals by club, season and competition
Club	Season	League			FA Cup		League Cup		Other		Total	
Club	Season	Division	Apps	Goals	Apps	Goals	Apps	Goals	Apps	Goals	Apps	Goals
Crewe Alexandra	2005–06	Championship	0	0	0	0	0	0	—		0	0
Crewe Alexandra	2006–07	League One	4	0	0	0	0	0	0	0	4	0
Crewe Alexandra	2007–08	League One	26	7	0	0	1	0	1 (Note: Appearance(s) in the Football League Trophy / EFL Trophy)	0	28	7
Crewe Alexandra	2008–09	League One	26	10	2	0	3	0	1	0	32	10
Crewe Alexandra	Crewe Alexandra total		56	17	2	0	4	0	2	0	64	17
Rotherham United	2009–10	League Two	35	3	2	0	2	2	0	0	39	5
Rotherham United	2010–11	League Two	18	1	0	0	0	0	2	0	20	1
Rotherham United	Rotherham United total		53	4	2	0	2	2	2	0	59	6
Port Vale	2010–11	League Two	13	3	—		—		—		13	3
Port Vale	2011–12	League Two	41	5	2	0	1	0	1	0	45	5
Port Vale	2012–13	League Two	46	31	2	1	1	0	2	1	51	33
Port Vale	2013–14	League One	43	12	5	2	1	0	2	2	51	16
Port Vale	2014–15	League One	33	8	0	0	2	2	1	2	36	12
Bury	2015–16	League One	36	6	3	1	2	0	2	0	43	7
Bury	2016–17	League One	37	4	0	0	1	1	2	2	40	7
Bury	Bury total		73	10	3	1	3	1	4	2	83	14
Port Vale	2017–18	League Two	41	17	3	2	1	0	1	0	46	19
Port Vale	2018–19	League Two	38	11	1	1	0	0	2	2	41	14
Port Vale	2019–20	League Two	32	6	3	4	1	0	1	0	37	10
Port Vale	2020–21	League Two	19	3	1	0	0	0	3	0	23	3
Port Vale	Port Vale total		306	96	17	10	7	2	13	7	343	115
Congleton Town	2021–22	NWCL Premier Division	39	18	1	0	—		9 (Note: 3 appearances and 1 goal in the FA Vase, 5 appearances and 1 goal in the League Challenge Cup, 1 appearance in the Cheshire Senior Cup)	2	49	20
Congleton Town	2022–23	NWCL Premier Division	36	17	7	2	—		13 (Note: 6 appearances and 5 goals in the FA Vase, 3 appearances and 1 goal in the League Challenge Cup, 4 appearances and 3 goals in the Cheshire Senior Cup)	9	56	28
Congleton Town	Congleton Town total		75	35	7	2	0	0	22	9	105	48
Witton Albion	2023–24	Northern Premier League; Division One West	23	6	0	0	—		4 (Note: 1 appearance and 1 goal in the FA Trophy, 3 appearances and 2 goals in the Mid Cheshire District FA Senior)	3	27	9
Hanley Town	2024–25	Northern Premier League; Division One West	11	1	3	0	—		3 (Note: Appearance(s) in the FA Trophy)	3	17	4
Kidsgrove Athletic	2024–25	Northern Premier League; Division One West	23	5	0	0	—		1 (Note: Appearance(s) in the Staffordshire Senior Cup)	0	24	5
Kidsgrove Athletic	2025–26	Northern Premier League; Division One West										
Kidsgrove Athletic	Kidsgrove Athletic total		23	5	0	0	0	0	1	0	24	5
Career total (Note: Statistics for Biddulph Victoria, Stafford Rangers, Barrow, and statistics for the 2025–26 season not known.)			620	174	34	13	16	5	51	24	721	216

== Honours ==
Port Vale

- Football League Two third-place promotion: 2012–13

Congleton Town

- Cheshire Senior Cup: 2023
- NWCL Challenge Cup: 2023

Witton Albion

- Mid Cheshire District FA Senior Cup: 2024

Individual

- PFA Team of the Year: 2012–13 League Two
- Football/EFL League Two Player of the Month: September 2012, October 2017
- Football League Two Player of the Year: 2012–13
- Port Vale Player of the Year: 2012–13, 2013–14, 2017–18
- North West Counties League Premier Division Player of the Month: August 2021
- Port Vale F.C. Hall of Fame: inducted 2026 (inaugural)
