= Chris Regis =

English footballer

Personal information
- Full name: Christopher Ethan Regis
- Date of birth: 11 November 1996 (age 29)
- Place of birth: Camden, London, England
- Height: 6 ft 3 in (1.91 m)
- Position: Midfielder

Youth career
- –2012: Arsenal
- 2012–2015: Southampton
- 2015–2017: Colchester United

Senior career*
Years	Team	Apps	(Gls)
2016–2017	Colchester United	0	(0)
2016	→ Maldon & Tiptree (loan)	5	(1)
2017	Sittingbourne		
2017	Farnborough	5	(0)
2017–2018	Port Vale	1	(0)
2018	Torquay United	8	(0)
2018–2019	Wealdstone	1	(0)
2019	Truro City	5	(0)
2019	Coggeshall Town	4	(1)
2019–2020	Cambridge City	7	(1)
2020–2022	Barton Rovers	33	(9)
2022	Chalfont St Peter	6	(0)
2022–2023	Braintree Town	33	(0)
2023	Bishop's Stortford	4	(0)
2023	Folkestone Invicta	9	(0)
2023–2024	Aveley	2	(0)
2024	Concord Rangers	1	(0)
2024	Sittingbourne	8	(0)
2024–2025	Hanwell Town	33	(2)
2025–2026	Brantham Athletic	11	(0)
2026	Slough Town	6	(1)
2026	→ Langley (dual-registration)	1	(0)

International career
2012	England U17	4	(1)
- * Club domestic league appearances and goals as of 13:05, 25 September 2026 (UTC)

Christopher Ethan Regis (born 11 November 1996) is an English footballer who last played as a midfielder for National League South club Slough Town.

A former England under-17 international, he spent his youth career with Arsenal and Southampton, before he joined Colchester United in 2015. He left Colchester in January 2017 without making a first-team appearance for the club, though he did have a loan spell at Maldon & Tiptree. He had brief spells at Sittingbourne and Farnborough before he signed a six-month contract with Port Vale in November 2017.

He returned to non-League football with Torquay United in July 2018 before moving on to Truro City via Wealdstone in the 2018–19 season. He later played for Coggeshall Town, Cambridge City, Barton Rovers, Chalfont St Peter, Braintree Town, Bishop's Stortford, Folkestone Invicta, Aveley, Concord Rangers, Sittingbourne (again), Hanwell Town, Brantham Athletic, and Slough Town. He played for Hanwell Town on the losing side of the 2025 Middlesex Senior Cup final.

== Club career ==
=== Early career ===
Born in Camden, London, Regis was on the books at Arsenal until his release in 2012. He completed his two-year scholarship with Southampton in 2015, before being released. He signed a development contract with Colchester United after a successful trial spell in August 2015. He joined Isthmian League Division One North side Maldon & Tiptree on a month-long loan deal on 23 February 2016. He made his debut that same day, and scored within just three minutes of a 2–2 draw with Dereham Town. He went on to make a total of five appearances for Steve Ball's "Jammers". Regis signed a one-year contract extension with Colchester in May 2016, but left the Colchester Community Stadium by mutual consent in January 2017 without making a first-team appearance.

Regis joined Isthmian League Division One South side Sittingbourne in March 2017. He started 2017–18 season with Farnborough, making his debut in the opening day 1–0 victory at St Neots Town on 14 August. He played a total of five Southern League Premier Division matches and one FA Cup game for the "Yellows" before he departed Cherrywood Road in September. He had a trial at Bolton Wanderers the following month.

=== Port Vale ===
On 7 November 2017, Regis signed for League Two side Port Vale until the end of the 2017–18 season, having impressed on a trial basis. He scored on his debut the same day in the club's EFL Trophy game, just four minutes into a 4–2 victory over Crewe Alexandra at Vale Park. He had been scouted by the club's football advisor John Rudge, who had spotted him during his unsuccessful trial spell at Bolton Wanderers. However, manager Neil Aspin soon criticized the player's attitude, saying that Regis failed to warrant even a place on the bench "because his attitude and everything outside of the football has not been good enough". Aspin allowed Regis to leave and find a new club in April 2018.

=== Non-League ===
On 31 July 2018, Regis joined newly-relegated National League South side Torquay United. However, he left the club for National League South rivals Wealdstone on 6 November after "Gulls" manager Gary Johnson told him he was not in his first-team plans at Plainmoor. However, he featured just once for the "Stones". He signed with Truro City on 22 March 2019. The "White Tigers" were relegated at the end of the 2018–19 season.

Regis joined Coggeshall Town in the Isthmian League North Division, scoring two goals in eight games at the start of the 2019–20 season. He signed with divisional rivals Cambridge City on 2 November 2019. He scored one goal in eight games. He joined Southern League Division One Central club Barton Rovers two months later. He later had a spell with Chalfont St Peter and then joined National League South side Braintree Town ahead of the 2022–23 campaign. He featured 39 times that season, including in the play-off quarter-final defeat at Worthing.

Despite signing a new deal ahead of the 2023–24 campaign with Braintree, Regis made the switch to newly promoted National League North side Bishop's Stortford. He went onto feature four times for the side before terminating his deal in late August 2023. He joined Folkestone Invicta on 13 October 2023. He signed with Aveley on 14 January 2024. He played one game for Concord Rangers on 9 March 2024. He then returned to Sittingbourne. He played nine games for the club towards the end of the 2023–24 season, including the play-off semi-final defeat to Three Bridges. In the summer of 2024 he made the switch to Hanwell Town of the Southern League Premier Division South. He featured 41 times across the 2024–25 campaign, including in the Middlesex Senior Cup final defeat to Rayners Lane. He made his Isthmian League North Division debut for Brantham Athletic on 4 October 2025. He played eleven games in the 2025–26 season.

On 10 August 2026, Regis joined National League South club Slough Town following a trial period where he impressed manager Alan Julian with his attitude. On 24 September 2026, Regis departed the club, having made six appearances and scored once for the Rebels.

== International career ==
Regis was selected to play for the England under-17 team in a friendly tournament in Tórshavn, Faroe Islands in August 2012. He played four matches and scored one goal against Finland.

== Style of play ==
Regis was a tough-tackling box-to-box midfielder.

== Career statistics ==
As of match played 15 September 2026

Appearances and goals by club, season and competition
Club	Season	League			FA Cup		EFL Cup		Other		Total	
Club	Season	Division	Apps	Goals	Apps	Goals	Apps	Goals	Apps	Goals	Apps	Goals
Colchester United	2015–16	League One	0	0	0	0	0	0	0	0	0	0
Colchester United	2016–17	League Two	0	0	0	0	0	0	0	0	0	0
Colchester United	Total		0	0	0	0	0	0	0	0	0	0
Maldon & Tiptree (loan)	2015–16	Isthmian League; Division One North	5	1	0	0	–		0	0	5	1
Sittingbourne	2016–17	Isthmian League; Division One South	2	0	0	0	–		0	0	2	0
Farnborough	2017–18	Southern League; Premier Division	5	0	1	0	–		0	0	6	0
Port Vale	2017–18	League Two	1	0	0	0	0	0	1 (Note: Appearance(s) in the EFL Trophy)	1	2	1
Torquay United	2018–19	National League South	8	0	0	0	–		0	0	8	0
Wealdstone	2018–19	National League South	1	0	0	0	–		0	0	1	0
Truro City	2018–19	National League South	5	0	0	0	–		0	0	5	0
Coggeshall Town	2019–20	Isthmian League; North Division	4	1	0	0	–		4 (Note: 3 appearances and 1 goal in the Alan Turvey Trophy and 1 appearance in the FA Trophy)	1	8	2
Cambridge City	2019–20	Isthmian League; North Division	7	1	0	0	–		1 (Note: Appearance(s) in the Cambridgeshire Invitation Cup)	0	8	1
Barton Rovers	2020–21	Southern League; Division One Central	8	3	0	0	–		0	0	8	3
Barton Rovers	2021–22	Southern League; Division One Central	25	6	3	0	–		2 (Note: 1 appearance in the Southern League Cup and 1 appearance in the Bedfordshire Senior Cup)	0	30	6
Barton Rovers	Total		33	9	3	0	0	0	2	0	38	9
Chalfont St Peter	2021–22	Isthmian League; South Central Division	6	0	0	0	–		1 (Note: Appearances/s in the Isthmian League inter-step play-offs)	0	7	0
Braintree Town	2022–23	National League South	33	0	3	0	–		3 (Note: Two appearances in the FA Trophy, one in the National League South play-offs)	0	39	0
Bishop's Stortford	2023–24	National League North	4	0	0	0	–		0	0	4	0
Folkestone Invicta	2023–24	Isthmian League; Premier Division	9	0	0	0	–		2 (Note: Appearance(s) in the Alan Turvey Trophy)	0	11	0
Aveley	2023–24	National League South	2	0	0	0	–		3 (Note: Two appearances in the FA Trophy, one in the Essex Senior Cup)	0	5	0
Concord Rangers	2023–24	Isthmian League; Premier Division	1	0	0	0	–		0	0	1	0
Sittingbourne	2023–24	Isthmian League; South East Division	8	0	0	0	–		1 (Note: Appearance(s) in the play-offs)	0	9	0
Hanwell Town	2024–25	Southern League; Premier Division South	33	2	2	0	–		6 (Note: 3 appearances in the FA Trophy, 2 appearances in the Middlesex Senior Cup and 1 appearance in the London Senior Cup)	0	41	2
Brantham Athletic	2025–26	Isthmian League; North Division	11	0	0	0	–		0	0	11	0
Slough Town	2026–27	National League South	6	1	0	0	–		0	0	6	1
Langley (dual-reg.)	2026–27	Combined Counties League; Division One	1	0	–		–		0	0	1	0
Career total (Note: Statistics for Sittingbourne not known.)			185	15	9	0	0	0	24	2	218	17

== Honours ==
Hanwell Town

- Middlesex Senior Cup runner-up: 2025
