= Jermaine Anderson =

Jermaine Anderson may refer to:

- Jermaine Anderson (basketball) (born 1983), Canadian basketball player
- Jermaine Anderson (English footballer) (born 1996)
- Jermaine Anderson (Jamaican footballer) (born 1979)
