= Ryan Boot =

English footballer (born 1994)

Personal information
- Full name: Ryan Thomas William Boot
- Date of birth: 9 November 1994 (age 32)
- Place of birth: Rocester, Staffordshire, England
- Height: 6 ft 1 in (1.85 m)
- Position: Goalkeeper

Team information
- Current team: Chesterfield
- Number: 23

Youth career
- Stoke City
- 2010–2013: Port Vale

Senior career*
Years	Team	Apps	(Gls)
2013–2018	Port Vale	23	(0)
2013–2014	→ Worcester City (loan)	4	(0)
2014	→ Norton United (loan)		
2014	→ Newcastle Town (loan)		
2015	→ Worcester City (loan)	10	(0)
2016	→ Worcester City (loan)	7	(0)
2016–2017	→ Macclesfield Town (loan)	0	(0)
2018–2023	Solihull Moors	193	(0)
2023–	Chesterfield	40	(0)

International career
2022	England C	1	(0)
- * Club domestic league appearances and goals as of 20:02, 3 May 2026 (UTC)

Ryan Thomas William Boot (born 9 November 1994) is an English professional footballer who plays as a goalkeeper for EFL League Two club Chesterfield.

Boot turned professional at Port Vale in April 2013. He played on loan at Worcester City, Norton United, Newcastle Town, and Macclesfield Town. He signed with Solihull Moors in July 2018 and played 225 league and cup games in his five seasons, winning the club's Supporters' Player of the Season award for the 2020–21 campaign. He signed with Chesterfield in August 2023 and was the club's back-up goalkeeper as they won the National League title at the end of the 2023–24 season.

== Club career ==
=== Port Vale ===
Boot attended the Academy at Stoke City before he was released in 2010, at which point he joined the Port Vale youth system. He signed a two-year professional contract with the club in April 2013. He had a trial at Premier League club Fulham in October 2013. He joined Conference North club Worcester City on loan in November 2013 and played four games. He was recalled from his loan in March 2014 due to an injury to Chris Neal. He played several friendly games in outfield positions for Vale in the 2014–15 pre-season as Sam Johnson and Chris Neal battled for the starting position in goal.

He was loaned out to Norton United of the Northern Premier League Division One South in August 2014. The following month he was loaned out to Newcastle Town, also in the Northern Premier League Division One South. He returned on loan to Worcester City in February 2015 until the end of the 2014–15 season. He signed a new two-year contract with Port Vale in June 2015. On 9 September 2016, he returned to Worcester City for a third loan spell. He played two games in the following four days, keeping clean sheets on both occasions. Having kept six clean sheets in ten games for Worcester, and then went on to join National League club Macclesfield Town on loan on 11 November. He played two FA Trophy games for the "Silkmen". He returned to Port Vale and made his EFL League One debut for the "Valiants" on 20 January, in a 2–2 draw with Bury at Vale Park. He did not feature again in the 2016–17 relegation campaign, but was offered a new one-year contract by manager Michael Brown in May 2017.

On 29 August, he started his first game of the 2017–18 season and kept a clean sheet in a 0–0 draw with Oldham Athletic at Boundary Park, before saving two penalties to help Vale win the resulting penalty shoot-out. Despite this, he did not get to feature in the first-team despite injuries to Rob Lainton, Sam Hornby and emergency loan signing Kelle Roos, with the new manager Neil Aspin choosing to draft in another emergency loan goalkeeper at the last minute, Dimitar Evtimov, rather than allowing Boot to reach five appearances and thereby preventing the club from making any further emergency goalkeeping loan signings. Evtimov proved to be a disappointment in his one appearance however, and Boot went on to play the following game and keep a clean sheet in a 2–0 victory over Oxford United on 3 November. Boot retained his first-team place following Lainton's return from injury, whilst Hornby was allowed to leave on loan. On 16 December, he impressed with what Aspin called a "a first-class display" in a 2–1 win at Carlisle United. On 24 March, he kept a clean sheet in a 0–0 draw at Wycombe Wanderers and his performance earned him a place on the EFL Team of the Week. However, on 2 April he dropped a routine catch to gift Crewe Alexandra the opening goal of a 2–2 draw before he was forced off with a foot injury; he apologised to supporters on Twitter after the game. Following an inconsistent season and the fact that both Lainton and Hornby were still under contract, Boot was released upon the expiry of his contract in May 2018.

=== Solihull Moors ===
On 3 July 2018, Boot was signed by former England international goalkeeper Tim Flowers, now manager of National League side Solihull Moors. He made his Moors debut on the opening day of the 2018–19 season, in a 2–1 win at Eastleigh on 4 August, and his performance earned him a place in the National League Team of the Weekend. He signed a contract extension in February 2019 after Flowers felt that Boot had proven himself a more than worthy successor to Max O'Leary. He helped the Moors to a second-place finish in the league, before they were beaten by AFC Fylde in the play-offs. He made 44 appearances in the 2019–20 season, which was permanently suspended on 26 March due to the COVID-19 pandemic in England, with Solihull in eighth-place. He kept 15 clean sheets in the 2020–21 campaign, playing every minute of the club's games, and was voted as Supporters' Player of the Season. Despite this, he was released by the club upon the expiry of his contract. However, the club reversed their decision and re-signed Boot in July.

After keeping five clean sheets in six matches, Boot was awarded the National League Player of the Month award for October 2021 with manager Neal Ardley getting the league's Manager of the Month award. He made 39 league appearances in the 2021–22 campaign, helping Solihull to qualify for the play-offs with a third-place finish. Solihull lost to Grimsby Town in the play-off final, with Joe McDonnell keeping goal for the Moors as Boot was ruled out with injury. Boot recovered from his injury at the start of the 2022–23 season, but struggled to make his way back into the starting eleven due to the good form of highly rated Wolverhampton Wanderers loanee goalkeeper Louie Moulden. He was one of four players to be offered a new contract at the end of the season. He declined the terms and left the club upon the expiry of his contract.

=== Chesterfield ===
Boot joined Chesterfield on trial in July 2023. He signed a one-year deal on 3 August, with the expectation to compete with Harry Tyrer for a first-team place. He signed a 12-month contract extension the following March. He remained as Tyrer's back-up as Chesterfield secured promotion back into the English Football League (EFL) as National League champions at the end of the 2023–24 season. He competed with young loanee Max Thompson for a first-team place in the 2024–25 season, with Thompson being given the number one shirt number. He played 34 games in the campaign, including playing both legs of Chesterfield's play-off semi-final defeat to Walsall, keeping 10 clean sheets, and signed a contract of undisclosed length in June 2025.

On 14 April 2026, he saved a stoppage-time penalty to ensure a 2–1 win over play-off rivals Grimsby Town, and was described as "unbelievable" by coach Kieron Dyer. He played both legs of the play-off semi-final against Notts County, conceding only one goal, though Chesterfield failed to score in either game and were eliminated.

== International career ==
Boot was called up to the England C team for a friendly against Wales C in March 2022.

== Style of play ==
Boot is a goalkeeper who has been praised for his kicking ability by Port Vale manager Neil Aspin and teammate Tom Pope.

== Career statistics ==
As of match played 15 May 2026

Appearances and goals by club, season and competition
Club	Season	League			FA Cup		EFL Cup		Other		Total	
Club	Season	Division	Apps	Goals	Apps	Goals	Apps	Goals	Apps	Goals	Apps	Goals
Port Vale	2012–13	League Two	0	0	0	0	0	0	0	0	0	0
Port Vale	2013–14	League One	0	0	0	0	0	0	0	0	0	0
Port Vale	2014–15	League One	0	0	0	0	0	0	0	0	0	0
Port Vale	2015–16	League One	0	0	0	0	0	0	0	0	0	0
Port Vale	2016–17	EFL League One	1	0	0	0	0	0	0	0	1	0
Port Vale	2017–18	EFL League Two	22	0	3	0	0	0	3 (Note: Appearance(s) in the EFL Trophy.)	0	28	0
Port Vale	Total		23	0	3	0	0	0	3	0	29	0
Worcester City (loan)	2013–14	Conference North	4	0	0	0	—		0	0	4	0
Worcester City (loan)	2014–15	Conference North	10	0	0	0	—		0	0	10	0
Worcester City (loan)	2016–17	National League North	7	0	3	0	—		0	0	10	0
Worcester City (loan)	Total		21	0	3	0	0	0	0	0	24	0
Macclesfield Town (loan)	2016–17	National League	0	0	0	0	—		2 (Note: Appearance(s) in the FA Trophy.)	0	2	0
Solihull Moors	2018–19	National League	46	0	4	0	—		6 (Note: 5 appearances in the FA Trophy and 1 in the play-offs.)	0	56	0
Solihull Moors	2019–20	National League	38	0	3	0	—		3 (Note: 2 appearances in the Scottish Challenge Cup and 1 in the FA Trophy.)	0	44	0
Solihull Moors	2020–21	National League	43	0	3	0	—		2	0	48	0
Solihull Moors	2021–22	National League	39	0	3	0	—		4	0	46	0
Solihull Moors	2022–23	National League	27	0	2	0	—		2	0	31	0
Solihull Moors	Total		193	0	15	0	0	0	17	0	225	0
Chesterfield	2023–24	National League	4	0	3	0	—		1	0	8	0
Chesterfield	2024–25	EFL League Two	28	0	0	0	1	0	5 (Note: 3 appearances in the EFL Trophy and 2 appearances in the play-offs.)	0	34	0
Chesterfield	2025–26	EFL League Two	8	0	0	0	0	0	6 (Note: 4 appearances in the EFL Trophy and 2 appearances in the play-offs.)	0	14	0
Chesterfield	2026–27	EFL League Two	8	0	0	0	0	0	0	0	0	0
Chesterfield	Total		40	0	3	0	1	0	12	0	56	0
Career total (Note: Statistics for Norton United and Newcastle Town not recorded.)			277	0	24	0	1	0	34	0	336	0

== Honours ==
Chesterfield

- National League: 2023–24

Individual

- Solihull Moors Supporters' Player of the Season: 2020–21
- National League Player of the Month: October 2021
