= 2013–14 Port Vale F.C. season =

Port Vale F.C.
2013–14 season
- Chairman: Norman Smurthwaite
- Manager: Micky Adams
- Stadium: Vale Park
- Football League One: 9th (61 points)
- FA Cup: Fourth Round (eliminated by Brighton & Hove Albion)
- League Cup: First Round (eliminated by Walsall)
- Football League Trophy: Second Round (eliminated by Rochdale)
- Player of the Year: Tom Pope
- Top goalscorer: League: Tom Pope (12); All: Tom Pope (16)
- Highest home attendance: 12,601 vs. Wolverhampton Wanderers, 31 August 2013
- Lowest home attendance: 2,351 vs. Bury, 3 September 2013
- Average home league attendance: 6,249
- Biggest win: 4–0 vs. Shortwood United, 11 November 2013
- Biggest defeat: 0–5 vs. Bristol City, 25 March 2014
Home colours	Away colours	Third colours

The 2013–14 season was Port Vale's 102nd season of football in the English Football League, and first season back in League One, following their promotion from League Two. Avoiding relegation was the aim set in pre-season, as the club had one of the lowest six budgets in the division.

The club enjoyed kind draws and a good run in the FA Cup, reaching the fourth round, where they were knocked out by Brighton & Hove Albion. They exited the League Cup in the first round, with Walsall the victors. They reached the second round of the Football League Trophy, losing out to Rochdale. The club overstretched itself financially, meaning that as they lay outside the play-offs in January manager Micky Adams could only sign largely untried youngsters on loan whilst releasing higher paid players either on free transfers or on loan. Their promotion push fell away, but they ended the season in ninth place – far exceeding their original aim.

Despite steady progress on the pitch, avoidable issues off the pitch continued to plague the club. Micky Adams was not offered a new contract until right at the end of the season, meaning that the season ended with the manager and most of the playing staff out of contract. The club also hit the headlines in April after Daniel Jones was sacked for attacking captain Doug Loft during a training ground session.

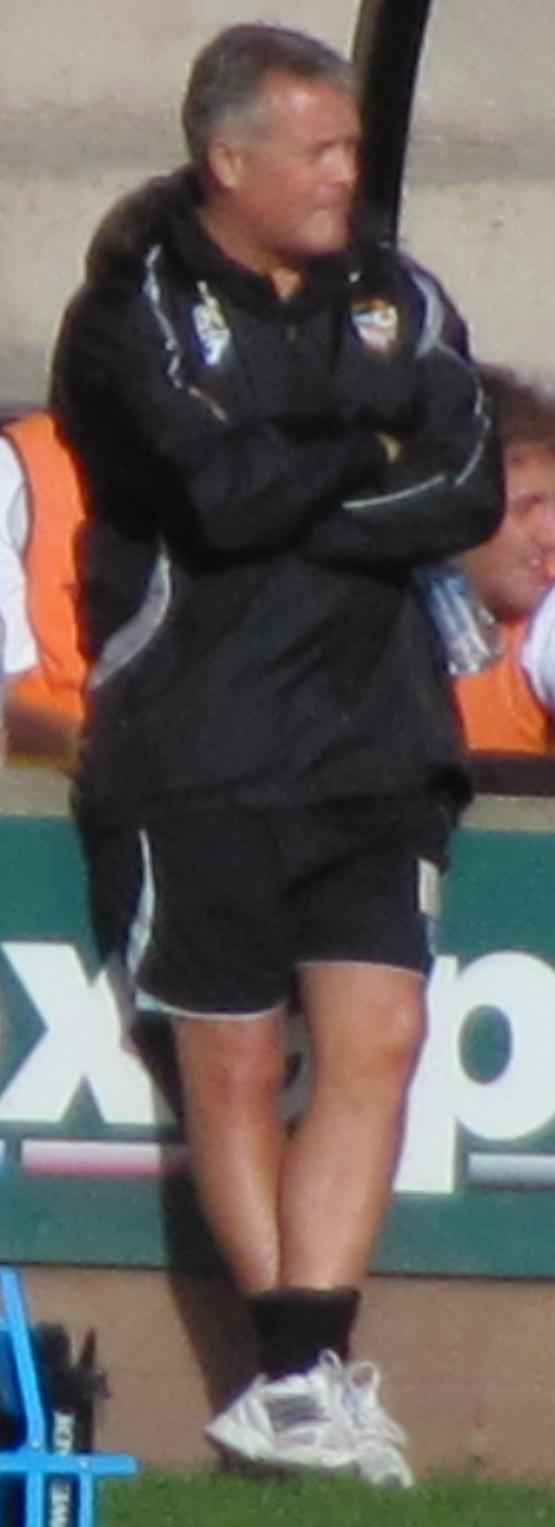
Manager Micky Adams.

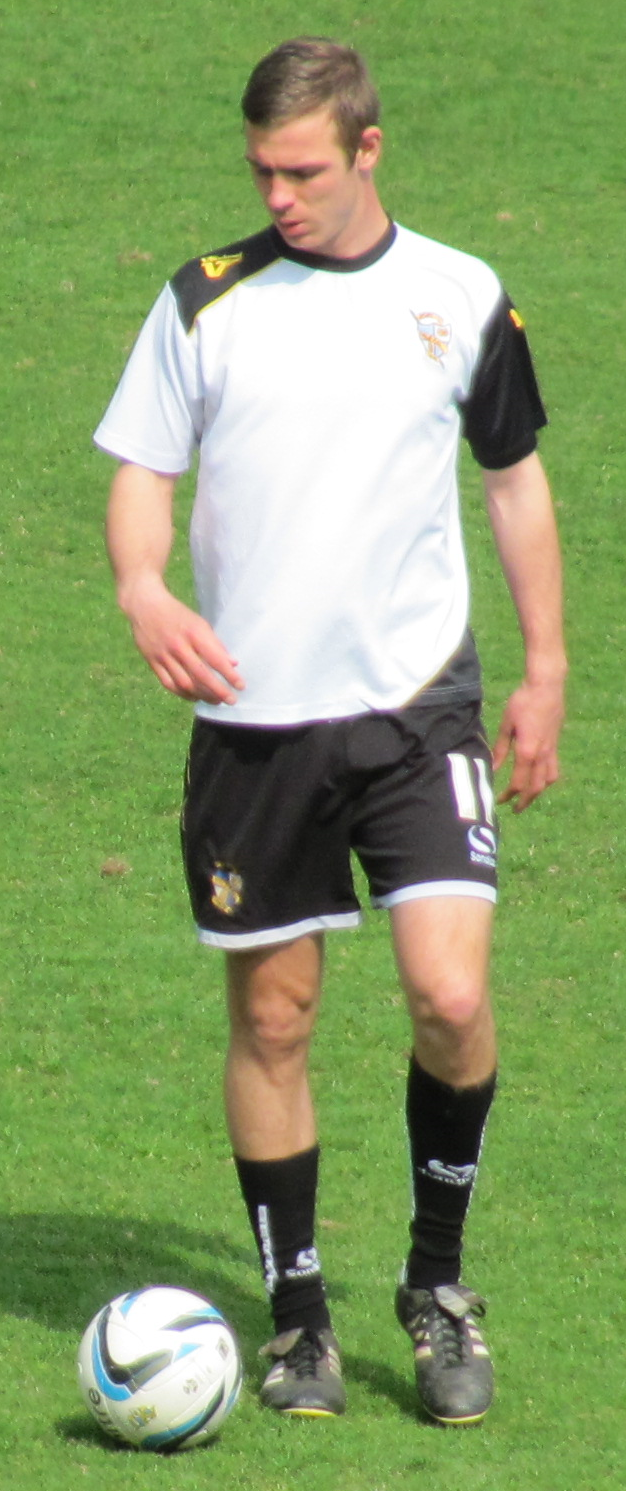
Tom Pope finished as top-scorer with 16 goals.

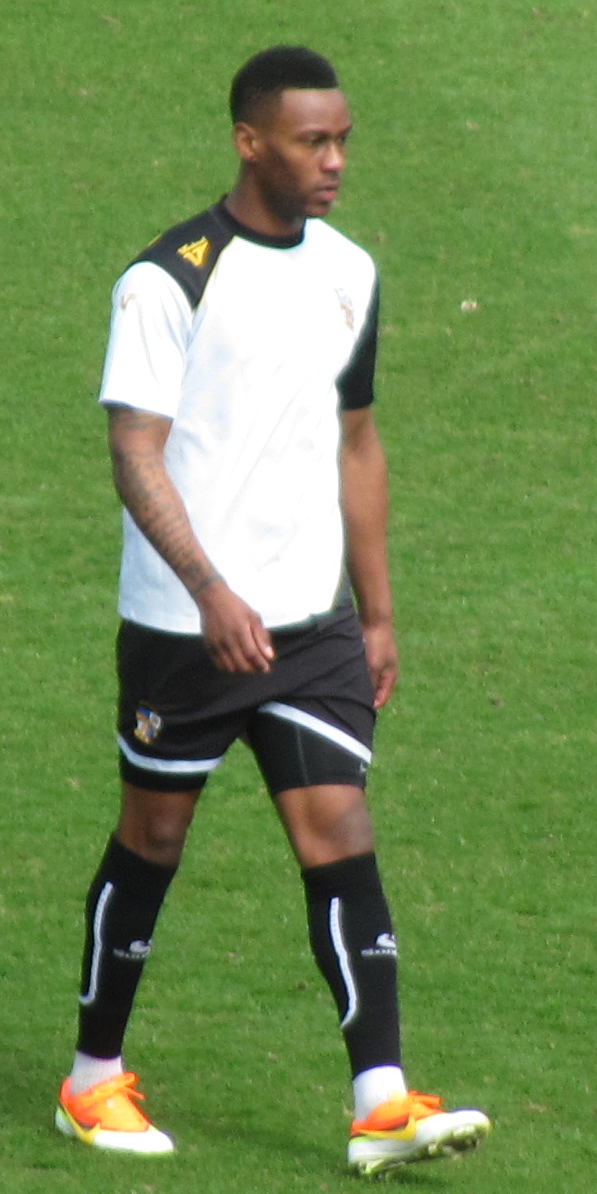
Jennison Myrie-Williams scored 10 goals in 45 appearances.

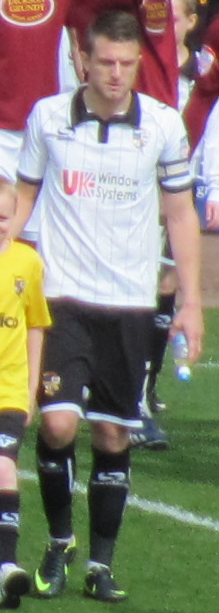
Doug Loft left the club in the summer.

== Overview ==
=== League One ===
Manager Micky Adams' first signing of the season was winger Kaid Mohamed, who stepped up to League One from League Two play-off semi-finalists Cheltenham Town; he was seen as a replacement for departing left-winger Ashley Vincent. Also joining the club were Preston North End defender Chris Robertson, Southend United forward Gavin Tomlin, and Sheffield Wednesday central midfielder Chris Lines. Liam Dickinson joined the Vale on trial for the second summer in a row, and again left without a contract after failing to prove his fitness. Adams, known for his gruelingly tough pre-season workouts, did not disappoint and left his players exhausted following their trip to Ireland. Following the trip, Anthony Griffith re-joined the club after securing his exit from League One rivals Leyton Orient. Mathias Kouo-Doumbé, Paul Reid and Ben Parker joined the club on trial, as Vale desperately needed more defensive cover. However, the sixth signing of the summer was revealed as former Stoke City left-back Carl Dickinson, who secured his release form Watford in order to join the Vale. Chairman Norman Smurthwaite then told fans that there were to be no new signings as the club's wage bill was now up to 60 per cent of turnover – the maximum allowed under the Football League's new Financial Fair Play rule. When asked what he though about Port Vale being one of the bookmakers favourites for relegation, Adams mused that "you never see a bookie on a bike do you? They’ve always got Jags and Mercs".

Vale opened the season with a credible 1–1 draw at home to Brentford; the "Bees" were tipped to gain promotion after losing last season's play-off final, but failed to make the most of the numerous chances they created at Vale Park. Vale then travelled away from home with a defensive mindset and narrowly lost 1–0 at Colchester United. Adams admitted that he picked the wrong side and formation, and that his players also seemed to lack "enthusiasm" in the game. He made changes to his team and tactics – reverting to 4–4–2 – for the visit of newly promoted Bradford City, and Vale secured a deserved 2–1 victory. The win was however, marred by racist chanting by a small section of supporters on the Railway Paddock; the club was later given a warning by the FA for the incident. Vale then travelled to Oldham Athletic and were well beaten 3–1 after Lee Hughes missed a 37th-minute penalty when the scores were level at 1–1. They ended the month with another defeat, as Wolverhampton Wanderers left Burslem with a 3–1 win, the one positive being Tom Pope getting off the mark with a last-minute consolation. Further crowd problems emerged as 23 fans were arrested after violence erupted after the game.

Pope continued his scoring run, as an injury-time goal earned the Vale a 1–0 win at struggling Carlisle United. This proved to be the last match for "Cumbrians" boss Greg Abbott, who was sacked two days later. Vale then were beaten 3–2 by Leyton Orient, who recorded their sixth-successive league victory. Despite the result, fans were pleased with the team's performance against the league leaders. Another tough match followed with Coventry City, and supporters were treated to an entertaining game that saw the Valiants twice come from behind to record a 3–2 victory. Immediately following the game Rob Page was put in temporary charge of first-team affairs at Vale Park after Adams decided to take time off work to have hip replacement surgery. His first game in charge was a 1–0 victory at Tranmere Rovers, with Chris Lines' well taken free kick being enough to win the three points. Page also took charge of the 1–1 home draw with Bristol City and admitted the players performed well below their best. Adams returned on crutches for the home encounter with high-flying Peterborough United and tried a new diamond formation in midfield; the tactic brought a good performance out of the side, but a late strike for "Posh" left Vale with a 1–0 defeat. The next game was against Sheffield United at Bramall Lane, and Adams was again disappointed at his boyhood club as Vale were beaten 2–1, with Daniel Jones sent off for two yellow cards after just 20 minutes. After the match Adams showed concern over the lack of club discipline on display as Myrie-Williams publicly argued with Adams after being substituted and Pope and Robertson had a heated discussion on the pitch. He had no complaints though when Vale came back from Crawley Town with a 3–0 victory; Jordan Hugill, fresh from a loan spell with Gateshead, made an impressive debut up front with Ben Williamson. The same eleven players started the following game at home to Gillingham, and came from 1–0 down at half-time to win 2–1 after the introduction of Tom Pope.

A tricky fixture away at Swindon Town opened the month of November, and Vale came from 3–0 down to make it 3–2 before they collapsed again and left the field on the wrong end of a 5–2 beating; this was the third game in a row at County Ground where Vale conceded at least five goals. Having failed to hold down a first-team place, especially with the tactical move away from wingers, Kaid Mohamed joined former club AFC Wimbledon on loan. They returned to form though in Burslem, recording a 3–1 victory over nearby Shrewsbury Town, and Adams said that the club had "unearthed a gem" after Hugill added Vale's third goal. The first big derby game against Crewe Alexandra came the following week, and the "Railwaymen" took the lead after 35 minutes only for Rob Taylor to mark his first appearance of the season by scoring the equalizing goal; Myrie-Williams scored the winning goal on 83 minutes which put Vale within one point of the play-offs whilst keeping Crewe second from bottom. However, Vale fans were disappointed to see Preston North End win 2–0 at Vale Park despite playing with only ten men from the 12th minute of the game; it later transpired that the referee had sent off the wrong man, and that Neil Kilkenny was dismissed for striking Anthony Griffith when in fact the culprit was eventual double goalscorer Joe Garner. On 29 November, goalkeeper Chris Neal injured his wrist and 21-year-old back-up 'keeper Sam Johnson was handed his league debut the following day away at Walsall. Johnson impressed and managed to keep a clean sheet as the "Valiants" recorded their first win at Walsall in 66 years.

Vale were heading for an eighth win in ten games when they took the lead at home to Stevenage on 14 December, but they conceded two goals in two minutes just before half-time and had to rely on a last-minute Tom Pope head to salvage a point. After the match Tom Pope bemoaned Stevenage's negative tactics. Vale then went down 3–0 at Milton Keynes Dons, with Adams describing the team as looking "like that last turkey on the shelf on Christmas Eve". They returned to winning ways with a 2–1 home victory over struggling Notts County, both Myre-Williams' and Tomlin's goals coming from the penalty spot. Vale ended the year just one place and two points outside the play-offs by beating sixth place Rotherham United 2–0 in a physical battle at Vale Park.

Vale opened 2014 with a difficult fixture away at fourth-placed Preston North End and were beaten 3–2 despite staging a late comeback when they went 3–0 down. Lee Hughes was allowed to join Forest Green Rovers on a free transfer after the 37-year-old stated that he wanted to play as much first-team football as possible before his retirement. On 7 January, Adams signed 19-year-old defender Jack Grimmer on loan from Premier League side Fulham; he stated, "We have a lot of experienced defenders making mistakes and we have been looking to strengthen in that area for a while." He made his debut against Brentford four days later alongside Joe Davis, who was also making his first appearance of the season following a loan spell with Luton Town, and the young pair impressed despite Vale losing 2–0 to the league leaders. Adams further strengthened the team by signing Belgian midfielder Florent Cuvelier on loan from Sheffield United. However, Cuvelier was ruled out for the rest of the season after tearing his anterior cruciate ligament (ACL) just 36 minutes into his debut – a 1–0 home win over Oldham, the only goal of the game being scored by Grimmer. Another midfielder, Billy Knott, was then signed on loan from Premier League side Sunderland.

Vale opened February by losing 3–2 to Gillingham, with 16 stone (220 lb; 100 kg) forward Adebayo Akinfenwa proving to be a thorn in the club's side again as he grabbed two of the goals. Micky Adams apologized to the fans for the performance. Vale then blew a 2–0 half-time lead over Swindon to lose the game 3–2 – the third game in a row where they conceded three goals. Following this Adams decided to change his tactics to a more defensive approach. Vale then had the chance to close the gap on the play-offs with a mid-week tie at home to Colchester, and a brace from Doug Loft took them 2–0 up shortly after half-time, a lead which young centre-backs Davis and Grimmer managed to defend without too many worrying moments. Another clean sheet followed with the same defensive partnership, though Vale failed to break down a determined Shrewsbury defence in blustery conditions. A trip to Valley Parade followed, and Bradford stole all three points with a stoppage time goal. The "A500 derby" followed, and a negative Vale line-up allowed Crewe the opening goal on 15 minutes; despite Adams making a double substitution on 32 minutes Vale were second best for the rest of the game and went on to lose 3–1.

March opened with a 3–0 defeat to Wolves at Molineux, who claimed their seventh successive victory to climb to the top of the table. Vale seemed to be heading for a fourth-successive defeat after going 1–0 down at home to Carlisle, but they turned the game around in the second half to turn out 2–1 winners. Second-placed Leyton Orient came away from Vale Park with a 2–0 win, Vale's good performance went unrewarded as they had two goals disallowed by the referee. Vale then travelled to Northampton to face Coventry, and looked to be heading home with the three points after leading 2–0 with ten minutes to go only to forced to settle for a point after a stoppage time equaliser . They built a three-goal lead in the next game, at home to Tranmere Rovers, and again conceded two goals but retained the lead to win the game 3–2. Vale were well beaten at Bristol City, the 5–0 thumping being their worst result of the campaign. After the match Adams took his players to acknowledge the club's travelling support only to end up in an ugly confrontation with a small number of fans. He told them "we are not fucking Real Madrid". He made six changes for the next match away at Stevenage, which ended in a 1–1 draw after a highly physical encounter.

April began with a 2–1 win over Crawley, the only negative in the game being a red card for Chris Robertson, who seemed baffled as to why he was dismissed. His ban was later overturned and handed to Chris Lines, who had committed the tackle from behind which started the brawl in which Robertson had attempted to intervene as peacemaker. Vale went on to beat Walsall 1–0 with a controversial penalty and in doing so recorded their first double over Walsall in 114 years. Captain Loft and Dan Jones were ruled out of the Vale's next fixture after a training ground confrontation between the pair left Loft with a facial injury. Following a short investigation Jones was sacked by the club. This upheaval seemed not to affect the team as they went 2–0 up over Notts County at Meadow Lane, but then four goals without reply from County all but ended Vale's faint hopes of a play-off push. Vale then recorded their fourth straight home win after Jordan Hugill scored the only goal of the game against Milton Keynes Dons. A trip to third-place Rotherham ended with a 1–0 defeat, despite the hosts going down to ten men. In their final home game of the season, Vale let slip a one-goal lead to lose 2–1 to Sheffield United. The season ended with a 0–0 draw with Peterborough United at London Road. Three players were released in the summer: Anthony Griffith, Liam Chilvers and Rob Taylor, whilst Chris Shuker announced his retirement due to a chronic knee injury. Micky Adams elected to sign a new contract with the club, as did most of the club's out-of-contract players. However, a big blow to the club was the departure of Doug Loft, who joined hometown club Gillingham. Another big name to leave the club was Jennison Myrie-Williams, who signed with Scunthorpe United. Promising forward Jordan Hugill also rejected a contract, and instead signed with Preston North End. Meanwhile, Gavin Tomlin was sold to Crawley Town for a small fee, after deciding to relocate back to London after failing to settle in the Midlands. The final departure was young defender Joe Davis, who left to join the Leicester City Academy.

=== Finances & ownership issues ===
The trade union GMB sponsored the club's kits, as well as Vale Park's Bycars Stand. The budget set in pre-season required an average home attendance of 7,900 to break even.

Just as the club seemed to have found stable leadership and steady progress on the pitch, in October chairman Norman Smurthwaite controversially banned local newspaper The Sentinel from all press events after taking objection with the newspaper's reporting a lengthy delay in producing specially presented third-kit shirts to fans who had pre-paid for the items in May. Smurthwaite responded by stating that the newspaper had been banned for contacting him personally for comment on the story rather than the club's media team, and that he was also frustrated with a Sentinel reporter for attempting to report facts which Smurthwaite had disclosed to the journalist "in confidence".

More worry came in December, when The Sunday People revealed that Smurthwaite had e-mailed agents pleading poverty over the club's finances. He later issued a statement saying that the wage bill budget set by the club in the summer was over-ambitious and that he had been forced to meet the £1 million budget deficit out of his own pocket.

The concern in January was over the future of manager Micky Adams and the apparent reluctance of Smurthwaite to offer a contract despite the positive results on the field as the manager's contract came close to its expiry at the end of the season; once a contract was promised Adams stated that "He has talked about it, now he has to deliver. I have never expressed a desire to leave. If everything is right I don't see there being a problem, but once again Norman is talking about things instead of doing things."

=== Cup competitions ===
Vale faced a kind draw in the first round of the FA Cup, as their opponents were Southern League Division One South & West club Shortwood United, an amateur side five leagues below League One who had never before qualified for the first round of the competition. The game was broadcast live on BT Sport, earning the club £67,500 in television money. Vale avoided an upset and recorded a 4–0 win. They then disposed of Conference Premier club Salisbury City with a 4–1 win, though the game had been level at 1–1 with less than 15 minutes to go. In the third round were League Two side Plymouth Argyle, and Vale seemed to be on their way through to the fourth round after first half goals from Gavin Tomlin and Tom Pope, but failed to make the most of their advantage and instead were forced to go to a replay after conceding two goals in the second half. Manager Micky Adams was angry with his team's performance, particularly the defending. Vale twice came from behind in the replay and went on to win 3–2 and survived having Chris Lines sent off for a foul in the box as Chris Neal saved the resulting penalty. The fourth round would be where Vale's adventure ended, as Championship club Brighton & Hove Albion put in a professional performance at Vale Park and left with a 3–1 victory.

Vale faced League One rivals Walsall at home in the first round of the League Cup. The club's abysmal record in the competition continued with a bitter 2–1 defeat – James Baxendale's winning goal coming seconds after Vale had a strong penalty appeal waved away.

The team made progress in the Football League Trophy, advancing past League Two side Bury after Tom Pope rescued the game with two goals in the last ten minutes. However, a disappointing performance against Rochdale saw them exit at the second round with a 1–0 loss.

== Results ==
=== Pre-season ===
5 July 2013 Friendly	Norton United	0–9	Port Vale F.C.	Smallthorne
19:30 BST		Report	Mohamed 7'; Loft 16'; Tomlin 26'; Dickinson 28', 30'; Williamson 48'; Dodds 87'; Pope 89'; Tambini 90'	Stadium: Norton Cricket Club & Miners Welfare Institute; Attendance: 800

7 July 2013 Friendly	Newcastle Town	0–4	Port Vale F.C.	Newcastle-under-Lyme
14:30 BST		Report	Pope 6'; Dodds 14'; Tomlin 52', 61'	Stadium: Lyme Valley Stadium; Attendance: 1,446; Referee: Steve Rushton

9 July 2013 Friendly	(Republic of Ireland) Athlone Town	0–6	Port Vale F.C.	Athlone
19:45 BST		Report	Hughes 3'; Tomlin 40'; Williamson 66'; Pope 74', 80', 87'	Stadium: Athlone Town Stadium; Referee: John McLoughlin

13 July 2013 Friendly	(Republic of Ireland) Bray Wanderers	1–5	Port Vale F.C.	Bray, County Wicklow
15:00 BST	O'Leary 74'	Report	Robertson 34'; Williamson 50', 71', 83'; Lines 61'	Stadium: Carlisle Grounds; Referee: Rob Harvey

16 July 2013 Friendly	Port Vale F.C.	3–5	Derby County	Burslem
19:30 BST	Pope 15', 30'; Robertson 28'	Report	Jacobs 3' (pen.); Hoganson 50'; Hendrick 54'; Russell 74'; Forsyth 83'	Stadium: Vale Park; Attendance: 2,408; Referee: Rob Lewis

19 July 2013 Friendly	Kidderminster Harriers	1–1	Port Vale F.C.	Kidderminster
19:30 BST	Johnson 55'	Report	Gowling 21' (og.)	Stadium: Aggborough Stadium; Attendance: 504; Referee: Steve Martin

23 July 2013 Friendly	Port Vale F.C.	0–1	Leicester City	Burslem
19:30 BST		Report	Waghorn 14'	Stadium: Vale Park; Attendance: 1,894; Referee: Steve Rushton

27 July 2013 Friendly	Alfreton Town	0–2	Port Vale F.C.	Alfreton
15:00 BST		Report	Robertson 11'; Hughes 86'	Stadium: North Street; Attendance: 350; Referee: Martin Watts

27 July 2013 Friendly	Leek Town	2–5	Port Vale F.C.	Leek, Staffordshire
15:00 BST	Shelley 16'; Grice 46'	Report	Tomlin 9', 14', 41' (pen.); Pope 68', 81'	Stadium: Harrison Park

=== Football League One ===
==== League table ====
Pos	Team	Pld	W	D	L	GF	GA	GD	Pts
7	Sheffield United	46	18	13	15	48	46	+2	67
8	Swindon Town	46	19	9	18	63	59	+4	66
9	Port Vale	46	18	7	21	59	73	−14	61
10	Milton Keynes Dons	46	17	9	20	63	65	−2	60
11	Bradford City	46	14	17	15	57	54	+3	59

Updated to match(es) played on 3 May 2014. Source: BBC Sport
Rules for classification: 1) Points; 2) Goal difference; 3) Number of goals scored

==== Results by matchday ====
Round	1	2	3	4	5	6	7	8	9	10	11	12	13	14	15	16	17	18	19	20	21	22	23	24	25	26	27	28	29	30	31	32	33	34	35	36	37	38	39	40	41	42	43	44	45	46
Ground	H	A	H	A	H	A	A	H	A	H	H	A	A	H	A	H	A	H	A	H	A	H	H	A	A	H	A	H	H	A	A	H	A	H	H	A	H	A	A	H	H	A	H	A	H	A
Result	D	L	W	L	L	W	L	W	W	D	L	L	W	W	L	W	W	L	W	D	L	W	W	L	L	W	L	L	W	D	L	L	L	W	L	D	W	L	D	W	W	L	W	L	L	D
Position	12	17	12	14	16	13	14	13	10	12	12	12	12	9	12	9	9	10	8	10	10	9	7	8	9	8	9	10	9	9	10	10	10	10	10	11	10	11	11	10	9	9	8	9	10	9
Points	1	1	4	4	4	7	7	10	13	14	14	14	17	20	20	23	26	26	29	30	30	33	36	36	36	39	39	39	42	43	43	43	43	46	46	47	50	50	51	54	57	57	60	60	60	61

Source: Statto
A = Away; H = Home; W = Win; D = Draw; L = Loss

==== Matches ====
3 August 2013 1	Port Vale F.C.	1–1	Brentford	Burslem
15:00 BST	Loft 31'	Report	Logan 27'	Stadium: Vale Park; Attendance: 7,579; Referee: Stephen Bratt

10 August 2013 2	Colchester United	1–0	Port Vale F.C.	Colchester
15:00 BST	Massey 74'	Report		Stadium: Colchester Community Stadium; Attendance: 3,201; Referee: Darren Deadman

17 August 2013 3	Port Vale F.C.	2–1	Bradford City	Bradford
15:00 BST	Hughes 43'; Loft 66'	Report	Wells 60'	Stadium: Vale Park; Attendance: 6,552; Referee: Carl Boyeson

24 August 2013 4	Oldham Athletic	3–1	Port Vale F.C.	Oldham
15:00 BST	Rooney 15', 57'; Dayton 77'	Report	Myrie-Williams 31'	Stadium: Boundary Park; Attendance: 4,788; Referee: Christopher Sarginson

31 August 2013 5	Port Vale F.C.	1–3	Wolverhampton Wanderers	Burslem
15:00 BST	Pope 90+2'	Report	Griffiths 56'; Sigurðarson 75'; McDonald 83'	Stadium: Vale Park; Attendance: 12,601; Referee: Graham Scott

7 September 2013 6	Carlisle United	0–1	Port Vale F.C.	Carlisle
15:00 BST		Report	Pope 90+2'	Stadium: Brunton Park; Attendance: 3,866; Referee: Mark Brown

14 September 2013 7	Leyton Orient	3–2	Port Vale F.C.	Leyton, East London
15:00 BST	Mooney 24', 45+2'; Lisbie 88'	Report	Dodds 21'; Myrie-Williams 54'	Stadium: Brisbane Road; Attendance: 4,888; Referee: Mick Russell

21 September 2013 8	Port Vale F.C.	3–2	Coventry City	Burslem
15:00 BST	Pope 40'; Loft 60'; Birchall 83'	Report	Wilson 35'; Moussa 43'	Stadium: Vale Park; Attendance: 9,218; Referee: Michael Naylor

28 September 2013 9	Tranmere Rovers	0–1	Port Vale F.C.	Prenton
15:00 BST		Report	Lines 56'	Stadium: Prenton Park; Attendance: 5,334; Referee: Paul Tierney

5 October 2013 10	Port Vale F.C.	1–1	Bristol City	Burslem
15:00 BST	Hughes 90'	Report	Wagstaff 55'	Stadium: Vale Park; Attendance: 6,275; Referee: Seb Stockbridge

12 October 2013 11	Port Vale F.C.	0–1	Peterborough United	Burslem
15:00 BST		Report	Barnett 86'	Stadium: Vale Park; Attendance: 6,311; Referee: Michael Bull; Assistant referees: P Gooch, J. Hunt; Fourth official: C Kavanagh

19 October 2013 12	Sheffield United	2–1	Port Vale F.C.	Sheffield
15:00 BST	Collins 12'; Doyle 75'	Report	Yates 45+3'	Stadium: Bramall Lane; Attendance: 18,545; Referee: Tim Robinson

22 October 2013 13	Crawley Town	0–3	Port Vale F.C.	Crawley
19:45 BST		Report	Dodds 10'; Loft 27'; Williamson 57'	Stadium: Broadfield Stadium; Attendance: 2,748; Referee: Fred Graham

26 October 2013 14	Port Vale F.C.	2–1	Gillingham	Burslem
15:00 BST	Robertson 47'; Pope 63'	Report	Kedwell 13'	Stadium: Vale Park; Attendance: 5,690; Referee: Darren Bond

2 November 2013 15	Swindon Town	5–2	Port Vale F.C.	Swindon
15:00 GMT	N'Guessan 24'; Ranger 50'; Luongo 57', 90'; Byrne 82'	Report	Pope 73'; Hughes 80'	Stadium: County Ground; Attendance: 7,637; Referee: Andy Woolmer

16 November 2013 16	Port Vale F.C.	3–1	Shrewsbury Town	Burslem
15:00 GMT	Robertson 23'; Myrie-Williams 30'; Hugill 90'	Report	McAlinden 59'	Stadium: Vale Park; Attendance: 6,547; Referee: Carl Boyeson; Assistant referees: Nigel Smith, Chris Kavanagh; Fourth official: Fred Graham

23 November 2013 17	Crewe Alexandra	1–2	Port Vale F.C.	Crewe
15:00 GMT	Evans 35'	Report	Taylor 43'; Myrie-Williams 83'	Stadium: Gresty Road; Attendance: 6,820; Referee: Graham Salisbury; Assistant referees: Simon Mather, Mark Duncan; Fourth official: Mark Astley

26 November 2013 18	Port Vale F.C.	0–2	Preston North End	Burslem
19:45 GMT		Report	Garner 30', 71'	Stadium: Vale Park; Attendance: 5,889; Referee: Andy Madley; Assistant referees: Paul Hobday, Nick Hobbis; Fourth official: Ryan Johnson

30 November 2013 19	Walsall	0–2	Port Vale F.C.	Walsall
15:00 GMT		Report	Pope 20'; Tomlin 66'	Stadium: Bescot Stadium; Attendance: 4,909; Referee: Michael Naylor; Assistant referees: David Plowright, Ricky Wootton; Fourth official: David Avent

14 December 2013 20	Port Vale F.C.	2–2	Stevenage	Burslem
15:00 GMT	Myrie-Williams 32' (pen.); Pope 89'	Report	Burrow 37', 40'	Stadium: Vale Park; Attendance: 4,967; Referee: Geoff Eltringham; Assistant referees: Matthew Parry, Neil Radford; Fourth official: Bob Roberts

21 December 2013 21	Milton Keynes Dons	3–0	Port Vale F.C.	Milton Keynes
15:00 GMT	Gleeson 4'; Reeves 13'; Bamford 32'	Report		Stadium: Stadium MK; Attendance: 7,882; Referee: Eddie Ilderton; Assistant referees: Matt Foley, Guy Stretton; Fourth official: Mark Mellor

26 December 2013 22	Port Vale F.C.	2–1	Notts County	Burslem
15:00 GMT	Myrie-Williams 24' (pen.); Tomlin 79' (pen.)	Report	Murray 43'	Stadium: Vale Park; Attendance: 7,028; Referee: Oliver Langford; Assistant referees: Tom Nield, James Mainwaring; Fourth official: Matt Wilkes

29 December 2013 23	Port Vale F.C.	2–0	Rotherham United	Burslem
15:00 GMT	Dodds 8'; Tomlin 68'	Report		Stadium: Vale Park; Attendance: 6,738; Referee: Rob Lewis; Assistant referees: Mark Duncan, Paul Hobday; Fourth official: Nick Gibbons

1 January 2014 24	Preston North End	3–2	Port Vale F.C.	Preston, Lancashire
15:00 GMT	Garner 43', 62'; Gallagher 50'	Report	Tomlin 69'; Hugill 84'	Stadium: Deepdale; Attendance: 10,653; Referee: Kevin Wright; Assistant referees: David Benton, Simon Clayton; Fourth official: Peter Wright

11 January 2014 25	Brentford	2–0	Port Vale F.C.	Brentford, West London
15:00 GMT	Trotta 30'; Grigg 88'	Report		Stadium: Griffin Park; Attendance: 8,327; Referee: Phil Gibbs; Assistant referees: Adrian Gillett, Colin Lymer; Fourth official: Dave Bushell

18 January 2014 26	Port Vale F.C.	1–0	Oldham Athletic	Burslem
15:00 GMT	Grimmer 53'	Report		Stadium: Vale Park; Attendance: 6,002; Referee: Gary Sutton; Assistant referees: Robert Jones, Mark Griffiths; Fourth official: Nick Hobbis

1 February 2014 27	Gillingham	3–2	Port Vale F.C.	Gillingham, Kent
15:00 GMT	Akinfenwa 42', 61'; McDonald 64'	Report	Robertson 81'; Hugill 87'	Stadium: Priestfield Stadium; Attendance: 6,356; Referee: Darren Deadman; Assistant referees: William Bull, Andrew Aylott; Fourth official: Robert Whitton

8 February 2014 28	Port Vale F.C.	2–3	Swindon Town	Burslem
15:00 GMT	Loft 20'; Pope 42'	Report	Ranger 51'; Pritchard 65'; Byrne 69'	Stadium: Vale Park; Attendance: 5,306; Referee: Seb Stockbridge; Assistant referees: Nigel Murphy, Joe Clark; Fourth official: Nigel Smith

11 February 2014 29	Port Vale F.C.	2–0	Colchester United	Burslem
19:45 GMT	Loft 15', 53'	Report		Stadium: Vale Park; Attendance: 3,734; Referee: Andy Haines; Assistant referees: Alan Clayton, Mark Astley; Fourth official: William Smallwood

15 February 2014 30	Shrewsbury Town	0–0	Port Vale F.C.	Shrewsbury
15:00 GMT		Report		Stadium: New Meadow; Attendance: 5,992; Referee: James Adcock; Assistant referees: Steven Plane, Mark Duncan; Fourth official: Rob Ellis

18 February 2014 31	Bradford City	1–0	Port Vale F.C.	Bradford
19:45 GMT	McHugh 90+1'	Report		Stadium: Valley Parade; Attendance: 12,106; Referee: Mark Brown; Assistant referees: Barry Gordon, Chris Kavanagh; Fourth official: James Mainwaring

22 February 2014 32	Port Vale F.C.	1–3	Crewe Alexandra	Burslem
15:00 GMT	Pope 76'	Report	Pogba 15'; Aneke 48' (pen.); Inman 73'	Stadium: Vale Park; Attendance: 7,812; Referee: Roger East; Assistant referees: Ian Hussin, Harry Lennard; Fourth official: Mark Haywood

1 March 2014 33	Wolverhampton Wanderers	3–0	Port Vale F.C.	Wolverhampton
15:00 GMT	Sako 52'; Dicko 72', 75'	Report		Stadium: Molineux Stadium; Attendance: 21,929; Referee: Craig Pawson; Assistant referees: Paul Rees, Ian Hussin; Fourth official: Keith Hill

8 March 2014 34	Port Vale F.C.	2–1	Carlisle United	Burslem
15:00 GMT	Williamson 56'; Pope 61'	Report	Meppen-Walter 39'	Stadium: Vale Park; Attendance: 5,009; Referee: Scott Duncan; Assistant referees: Ricky Wootton, Robert Jones; Fourth official: Simon Mather

11 March 2014 35	Port Vale F.C.	0–2	Leyton Orient	Burslem
19:45 GMT		Report	Cox 41'; Clarke 58'	Stadium: Vale Park; Attendance: 4,235; Referee: Jeremy Simpson; Assistant referees: Paul Hobday, Michael Denton; Fourth official: Marc Perry

16 March 2014 36	Coventry City	2–2	Port Vale F.C.	Northampton
15:00 GMT	Clarke 81'; Wilson 90+2'	Report	Loft 1'; Williamson 74'	Stadium: Sixfields Stadium; Attendance: 1,627; Referee: Rob Lewis; Assistant referees: John Busby, Anthony Tankard; Fourth official: Ian Rathbone

22 March 2014 37	Port Vale F.C.	3–2	Tranmere Rovers	Burslem
15:00 GMT	Pope 3'; Knott 47'; Williamson 56'	Report	Taylor 58'; Koumas 60'	Stadium: Vale Park; Attendance: 5,449; Referee: Richard Clark; Assistant referees: Mark Griffiths, William Smallwood; Fourth official: Paul Thompson

25 March 2014 38	Bristol City	5–0	Port Vale F.C.	Ashton Gate, Bristol
19:45 GMT	Emmanuel-Thomas 16', 45+2'; Nosworthy 41'; Baldock 45', 74'	Report		Stadium: Ashton Gate; Attendance: 10,940; Referee: Keith Hill; Assistant referees: Grant Taylor, Mark Howes; Fourth official: Adam Matthews

29 March 2014 39	Stevenage	1–1	Port Vale F.C.	Stevenage
15:00 GMT	Hartley 61'	Report	Pope 48'	Stadium: Broadhall Way; Attendance: 2,912; Referee: Charles Breakspear; Assistant referees: Nigel Lugg, Carl Brook; Fourth official: Carl Fitch

1 April 2014 40	Port Vale F.C.	2–1	Crawley Town	Burslem
19:45 BST	Knott 50'; Loft 84'	Report	Clarke 35' (pen.)	Stadium: Vale Park; Attendance: 3,755; Referee: Nigel Miller; Assistant referees: Peter Gooch, David Plowright; Fourth official: Robert Lewis

5 April 2014 41	Port Vale F.C.	1–0	Walsall	Burslem
15:00 BST	Myrie-Williams 52' (pen.)	Report		Stadium: Vale Park; Attendance: 5,569; Referee: Carl Berry; Assistant referees: Ian Crouch, Mark Duncan; Fourth official: Edward Smart

12 April 2014 42	Notts County	4–2	Port Vale F.C.	Nottingham
15:00 BST	Spencer 27', 34'; Campbell-Ryce 48', 85'	Report	Thompson 13' (og.); Tomlin 25'	Stadium: Meadow Lane; Attendance: 5,613; Referee: Darren Drysdale; Assistant referees: Robert Atkin, Stephen Ross; Fourth official: Declan Ford

18 April 2014 43	Port Vale F.C.	1–0	Milton Keynes Dons	Burslem
15:00 BST	Hugill 48'	Report		Stadium: Vale Park; Attendance: 5,074; Referee: Andy Madley; Assistant referees: Nick Gibbons, Philip Dermott; Fourth official: Scott Mathieson

21 April 2014 44	Rotherham United	1–0	Port Vale F.C.	Burslem
15:00 BST	Agard 79'	Report		Stadium: New York Stadium; Attendance: 7,743; Referee: David Coote; Assistant referees: Paul Kettlewell, Neil Sharp; Fourth official: Mark Heywood

26 April 2014 45	Port Vale F.C.	1–2	Sheffield United	Burslem
15:00 BST	Dodds 51'	Report	Murphy 83'; Porter 90'	Stadium: Vale Park; Attendance: 6,394; Referee: Steve Bratt; Assistant referees: Karl Evans, Mark Howes; Fourth official: Mark Astley

3 May 2014 46	Peterborough United	0–0	Port Vale F.C.	Peterborough
15:00 BST		Report		Stadium: London Road Stadium; Attendance: 6,621; Referee: Jeremy Simpson; Assistant referees: Robert Hyde, David Avent; Fourth official: Matt McGrath

=== FA Cup ===
11 November 2013 R1	Shortwood United	0–4	Port Vale F.C.	Nailsworth
19:45 GMT		Report	Myrie-Williams 15', 89' (pen.); Birchall 30'; Lines 90'	Stadium: The Meadowbank Ground; Attendance: 1,247; Referee: Dean Whitestone

6 December 2013 R2	Port Vale F.C.	4–1	Salisbury City	Burslem
19:45 GMT	Robertson 24'; Pope 78'; Taylor 81'; Williamson 90'	Report	Fitchett 64'	Stadium: Vale Park; Attendance: 4,658; Referee: Darren Sheldrake

5 January 2014 R3	Port Vale F.C.	2–2	Plymouth Argyle	Burslem
15:00 GMT	Tomlin 15'; Pope 36'	Report	Reid 31'; Purrington 74'	Stadium: Vale Park; Attendance: 5,511; Referee: David Webb

14 January 2014 Replay	Plymouth Argyle	2–3	Port Vale F.C.	Plymouth
19:45 GMT	Gurrieri 2'; Hourihane 36'	Report	Hugill 30'; Williamson 63'; Myrie-Williams 75'	Stadium: Home Park; Attendance: 6,474; Referee: Graham Scott

25 January 2014 R4	Port Vale F.C.	1–3	Brighton & Hove Albion	Burslem
15:00 GMT	Robertson 36'	Report	Ince 27'; March 43'; Obika 78'	Stadium: Vale Park; Attendance: 7,293; Referee: Paul Tierney

=== League Cup ===
6 August 2013 R1	Port Vale F.C.	1–2	Walsall	Burslem
19:45 BST	Robertson 59'	Report	Westcarr 43'; Baxendale 84'	Stadium: Vale Park; Attendance: 4,013; Referee: Andy Haines

=== Football League Trophy ===
3 September 2013 R1	Port Vale F.C.	2–1	Bury	Burslem
19:15 BST	Pope 80', 90+1'	Report	Sedgwick 71'	Stadium: Vale Park; Attendance: 2,351; Referee: David Coote

8 October 2013 R2	Port Vale F.C.	0–1	Rochdale	Burslem
19:30 BST		Report	Rafferty 40'	Stadium: Vale Park; Attendance: 2,612; Referee: Scot Mathieson

== Squad statistics ==
=== Appearances and goals ===
Key to positions: GK – Goalkeeper; DF – Defender; MF – Midfielder; FW – Forward

No.	Pos	Nat	Player	Total		League One		FA Cup		League Cup		League Two	
No.	Pos	Nat	Player	Apps	Goals	Apps	Goals	Apps	Goals	Apps	Goals	Apps	Goals
1	GK	(England) ENG	Chris Neal	38	0	31	0	4	0	1	0	2	0
2	DF	(England) ENG	Adam Yates	41	1	34	1	5	0	1	0	1	0
4	DF	(Scotland) SCO	Chris Robertson	45	6	37	3	5	2	1	1	2	0
5	DF	(England) ENG	Carl Dickinson	47	0	40	0	4	0	1	0	2	0
6	DF	(England) ENG	Liam Chilvers	17	0	14	0	2	0	0	0	1	0
7	MF	(England) ENG	Doug Loft	43	9	37	9	3	0	1	0	2	0
8	FW	(England) ENG	Louis Dodds	35	4	29	4	4	0	0	0	2	0
9	MF	(England) ENG	Jennison Myrie-Williams	46	10	38	7	5	3	1	0	2	0
10	FW	(England) ENG	Gavin Tomlin	28	6	24	5	3	1	1	0	0	0
11	FW	(England) ENG	Tom Pope	51	16	43	12	5	2	1	0	2	2
12	GK	(England) ENG	Sam Johnson	17	0	16	0	1	0	0	0	0	0
14	MF	(England) ENG	Rob Taylor	8	2	6	1	2	1	0	0	0	0
15	MF	(England) ENG	Chris Shuker	12	0	10	0	1	0	0	0	1	0
17	DF	(England) ENG	Joe Davis	12	0	11	0	1	0	0	0	0	0
18	MF	(England) ENG	Chris Lines	40	2	34	1	4	1	1	0	1	0
19	FW	(England) ENG	Ben Williamson	46	6	38	4	5	2	1	0	2	0
21	MF	(Montserrat) MSR	Anthony Griffith	45	0	38	0	5	0	1	0	1	0
22	MF	(England) ENG	Ryan Lloyd	3	0	3	0	0	0	0	0	0	0
23	MF	(Wales) WAL	Kaid Mohamed	8	0	6	0	0	0	1	0	1	0
24	DF	(Wales) WAL	Richard Duffy	31	0	28	0	2	0	0	0	1	0
25	MF	(Belgium) BEL	Florent Cuvelier	1	0	1	0	0	0	0	0	0	0
26	MF	(Trinidad and Tobago) TTO	Chris Birchall	32	2	27	1	3	1	0	0	2	0
27	DF	(England) ENG	Nathan Smith	0	0	0	0	0	0	0	0	0	0
28	MF	(England) ENG	Billy Knott	18	2	18	2	0	0	0	0	0	0
34	GK	(England) ENG	Ryan Boot	0	0	0	0	0	0	0	0	0	0
39	FW	(England) ENG	Jordan Hugill	24	5	20	4	4	1	0	0	0	0
Players who featured but departed the club during the season:
3	DF	(England) ENG	Daniel Jones	22	0	20	0	0	0	1	0	1	0
20	DF	(Scotland) SCO	Jack Grimmer	14	1	13	1	1	0	0	0	0	0
29	FW	(England) ENG	Lee Hughes	16	3	13	3	1	0	1	0	1	0
32	DF	(England) ENG	Tom Morris	0	0	0	0	0	0	0	0	0	0
33	DF	(England) ENG	Dougie Price	0	0	0	0	0	0	0	0	0	0
35	FW	(England) ENG	Dominic Bell	0	0	0	0	0	0	0	0	0	0
36	DF	(England) ENG	Ben Jefford	0	0	0	0	0	0	0	0	0	0
37	MF	(Portugal) POR	Wilson Carvalho	0	0	0	0	0	0	0	0	0	0
38	DF	(Saint Lucia) LCA	Cheye Alexander	0	0	0	0	0	0	0	0	0	0
40	FW	(England) ENG	Louis Tambini	0	0	0	0	0	0	0	0	0	0
41	MF	(Republic of Ireland) IRL	Gary O'Neill	0	0	0	0	0	0	0	0	0	0

=== Top scorers ===
Place	Position	Nation	Number	Name	League One	FA Cup	League Cup	Football League Trophy	Total
1	FW	England	11	Tom Pope	12	2	0	2	16
2	MF	England	9	Jennison Myrie-Williams	7	3	0	0	10
3	MF	England	7	Doug Loft	9	0	0	0	9
4	DF	Scotland	4	Chris Robertson	3	2	1	0	6
–	FW	England	10	Gavin Tomlin	5	1	0	0	6
–	FW	England	19	Ben Williamson	4	2	0	0	6
7	FW	England	39	Jordan Hugill	4	1	0	0	5
8	FW	England	8	Louis Dodds	4	0	0	0	4
9	FW	England	29	Lee Hughes	3	0	0	0	3
10	MF	Trinidad	26	Chris Birchall	1	1	0	0	2
–	MF	England	28	Billy Knott	2	0	0	0	2
–	MF	England	18	Chris Lines	1	1	0	0	2
–	MF	England	14	Rob Taylor	1	1	0	0	2
14	DF	Scotland	20	Jack Grimmer	1	0	0	0	1
–	DF	England	2	Adam Yates	1	0	0	0	1
–	DF	n/a	n/a	Own goals	1	0	0	0	1
				TOTALS	59	14	1	2	76

=== Disciplinary record ===
Number	Nation	Position	Name	League One		FA Cup		League Cup		League Trophy		Total	
Number	Nation	Position	Name	Yellow card	Red card	Yellow card	Red card	Yellow card	Red card	Yellow card	Red card	Yellow card	Red card
5	England	DF	Carl Dickinson	13	1	1	0	0	0	0	0	14	1
18	England	MF	Chris Lines	8	0	1	1	0	0	1	0	10	1
4	Scotland	DF	Chris Robertson	6	1	1	0	0	0	0	0	7	1 (Note: Chris Robertson's red card was overturned on appeal after the referee admitted a case of mistaken identity, and the ban was transferred to Chris Lines.)
3	England	DF	Daniel Jones	1	1	0	0	0	0	1	0	2	1
21	Montserrat	FW	Anthony Griffith	8	0	1	0	0	0	0	0	9	0
24	Wales	DF	Richard Duffy	7	0	0	0	0	0	1	0	8	0
7	England	MF	Doug Loft	7	0	1	0	0	0	0	0	8	0
9	England	MF	Jennison Myrie-Williams	4	0	1	0	0	0	1	0	6	0
20	Scotland	DF	Jack Grimmer	3	0	1	0	0	0	0	0	4	0
11	England	FW	Tom Pope	3	0	1	0	0	0	0	0	4	0
26	Trinidad	MF	Chris Birchall	3	0	0	0	0	0	0	0	3	0
6	England	DF	Liam Chilvers	2	0	1	0	0	0	0	0	3	0
8	England	FW	Louis Dodds	3	0	0	0	0	0	0	0	3	0
29	England	FW	Lee Hughes	3	0	0	0	0	0	0	0	3	0
1	England	GK	Chris Neal	2	0	1	0	0	0	0	0	3	0
17	England	DF	Joe Davis	2	0	0	0	0	0	0	0	2	0
28	England	MF	Billy Knott	2	0	0	0	0	0	0	0	2	0
39	England	FW	Jordan Hugill	1	0	0	0	0	0	0	0	1	0
15	England	MF	Chris Shuker	1	0	0	0	0	0	0	0	1	0
10	England	FW	Gavin Tomlin	0	0	1	0	0	0	0	0	1	0
19	England	FW	Ben Williamson	1	0	0	0	0	0	0	0	1	0
			TOTALS	80	3	10	1	0	0	4	0	95	4

Sourced from Soccerway.

== Awards ==
End of Season Awards	Winner
Player of the Year	Tom Pope
Away Travel Player of the Year	Chris Neal
Players' Player of the Year	Chris Neal
Young Player of the Year	Jordan Hugill
Youth Player of the Year	Nathan Smith
Goal of the Season	Billy Knott (vs Crawley Town, 1 April 2014)

== Transfers ==
=== Transfers in ===
Date from	Position	Nationality	Name	From	Fee	Ref.
1 June 2013	MF	WAL	Kaid Mohamed	Cheltenham Town	Free transfer	
27 June 2013	DF	SCO	Chris Robertson	Preston North End	Free transfer	
27 June 2013	FW	ENG	Gavin Tomlin	Southend United	Free transfer	
6 July 2013	MF	ENG	Chris Lines	Sheffield Wednesday	Free transfer	
16 July 2013	MF	Montserrat	Anthony Griffith	Leyton Orient	Free transfer	
25 July 2013	DF	ENG	Carl Dickinson	Watford	Free transfer	

=== Transfers out ===
Date from	Position	Nationality	Name	To	Fee	Ref.
3 January 2014	FW	ENG	Lee Hughes	Forest Green Rovers	Free transfer	
14 April 2014	DF	ENG	Daniel Jones	Chesterfield	Sacked	
18 April 2014	DF	ENG	Dougie Price		Released	
18 April 2014	DF	ENG	Tom Morris	(Republic of Ireland) Longford Town	Released	
18 April 2014	FW	ENG	Dominic Dell	Hednesford Town	Released	
18 April 2014	DF	ENG	Ben Jefford	Welling United	Released	
18 April 2014	MF	POR	Wilson Carvalho	Corby Town	Released	
18 April 2014	DF	LCA	Cheye Alexander	Concord Rangers	Released	
18 April 2014	FW	ENG	Louis Tambini	(United States) New Haven Chargers	Released	
18 April 2014	MF	IRL	Gary O'Neill	Hereford United	Released	
1 May 2014	MF	ENG	Chris Shuker	Retired		
3 May 2014	MF	Montserrat	Anthony Griffith	Harrogate Town	Released	
3 May 2014	MF	ENG	Rob Taylor	Mansfield Town	Released	
3 May 2014	DF	ENG	Liam Chilvers	Hyde	Released	
10 June 2014	MF	ENG	Doug Loft	Gillingham	Rejected contract	
11 June 2014	MF	ENG	Jennison Myrie-Williams	Scunthorpe United	Rejected contract	
18 June 2014	FW	ENG	Gavin Tomlin	Crawley Town	Undisclosed fee	
19 June 2014	FW	ENG	Jordan Hugill	Preston North End	Undisclosed fee	
30 June 2014	DF	ENG	Joe Davis	Leicester City Academy	Rejected contract	

=== Loans in ===
Start date	Position	Nationality	Name	From	End date	Ref.
7 January 2014	DF	SCO	Jack Grimmer	Fulham	27 March 2014	
16 January 2014	MF	BEL	Florent Cuvelier	Sheffield United	End of season	
22 January 2014	MF	ENG	Billy Knott	Sunderland	End of season	

=== Loans out ===
Start date	Position	Nationality	Name	To	End date	Ref.
31 August 2013	MF	ENG	Ryan Lloyd	Tamworth	31 September 2013	
20 September 2013	FW	ENG	Jordan Hugill	Gateshead	19 October 2013	
1 November 2013	MF	POR	Wilson Carvalho	Hemel Hempstead Town	1 December 2013	
November 2013	DF	ENG	Tom Morris	Stafford Rangers	?	
11 November 2013	MF	WAL	Kaid Mohamed	AFC Wimbledon	4 January 2014	
16 November 2013	GK	ENG	Ryan Boot	Worcester City	24 March 2014	
28 November 2013	DF	ENG	Joe Davis	Luton Town	4 January 2014	
28 November 2013	FW	ENG	Dominic Dell	Worcester City	29 December 2013	
6 December 2013	MF	POR	Wilson Carvalho	Corby Town	6 January 2014	
6 December 2013	FW	ENG	Louis Tambini	Corby Town	6 January 2014	
13 December 2013	DF	LCA	Cheye Alexander	Ilkeston	11 January 2014	
9 January 2014	DF	ENG	Ben Jefford	Southport	9 February 2014	
10 January 2014	MF	POR	Wilson Carvalho	Ilkeston	10 February 2014	
23 January 2014	MF	WAL	Kaid Mohamed	Bristol Rovers	End of season	
24 January 2014	MF	IRL	Gary O'Neil	Southport	24 February 2014	
