= 2014–15 Port Vale F.C. season =

Port Vale F.C.
2014–15 season
- Chairman: Norman Smurthwaite
- Manager: Micky Adams (until 18 September); Rob Page (from 18 September)
- Stadium: Vale Park
- Football League One: 18th (54 points)
- FA Cup: First Round (eliminated by Milton Keynes Dons)
- League Cup: Second Round (eliminated by Cardiff City)
- Football League Trophy: Second Round (eliminated by Preston North End)
- Player of the Year: Michael O'Connor
- Top goalscorer: League: Tom Pope (8); All: Tom Pope (12)
- Highest home attendance: 8,524 vs. Sheffield United, 26 December 2014
- Lowest home attendance: 2,824 vs. Hartlepool United, 12 August 2014
- Average home league attendance: 5,290
- Biggest win: 6–2 vs. Hartlepool United, 12 August 2014
- Biggest defeat: 0–3 (twice)
Home colours	Away colours	Third colours

The 2014–15 season was Port Vale's 103rd season of football in the English Football League and second-successive season in League One. Before the season began, the bookies listed the club as the third favourite to be relegated.

A run of six defeats resulted in a surprise resignation from manager Micky Adams on 18 September, and his assistant Rob Page took his place in the hot seat. Chairman Norman Smurthwaite then initiated his plan for the club to sign young players to develop and sell for profit later. Vale exited the cups in the early stages after coming up against tough opposition, exiting the FA Cup at the hands of Milton Keynes Dons, losing to Cardiff City in the League Cup and Preston North End in the Football League Trophy. They climbed up the league table under Page, reaching the outskirts of the play-offs by the end of February before a late-season collapse saw them finish in 18th place.

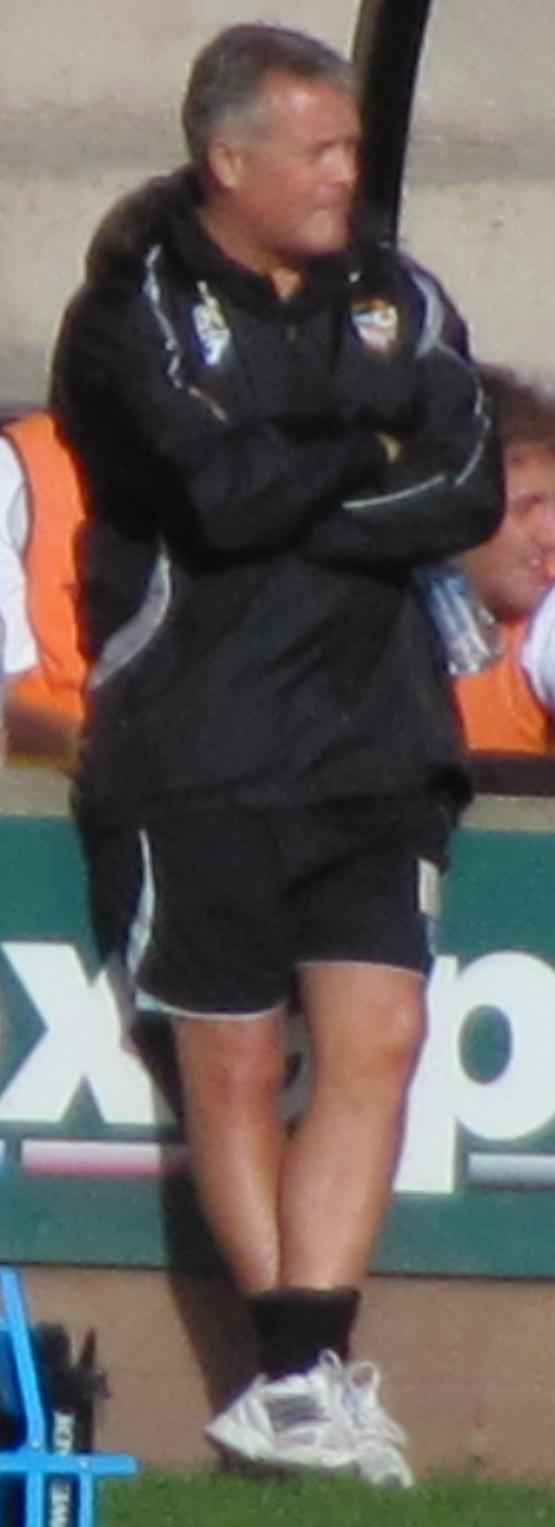
Manager Micky Adams resigned in September.

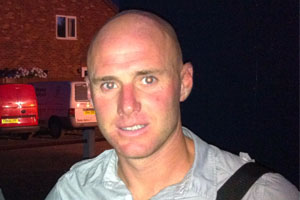
Rob Page replaced Adams as manager.

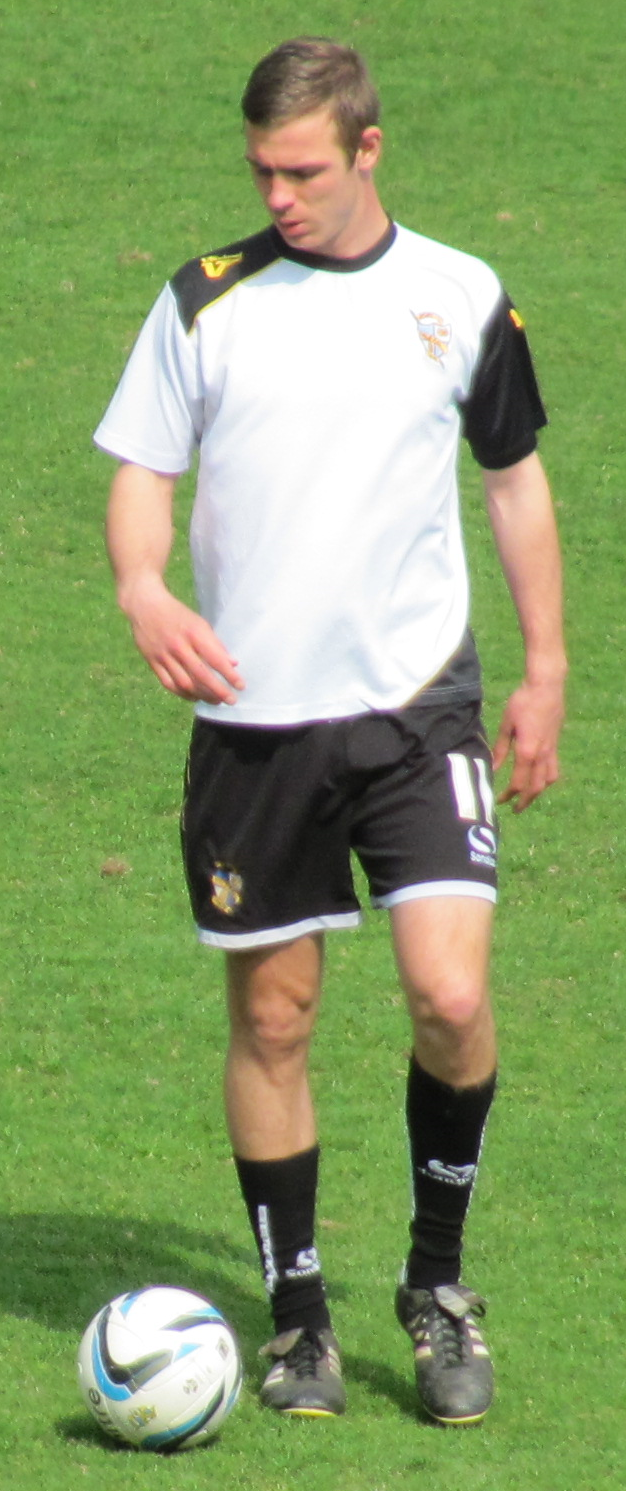
Tom Pope finished as top-scorer with 12 goals.

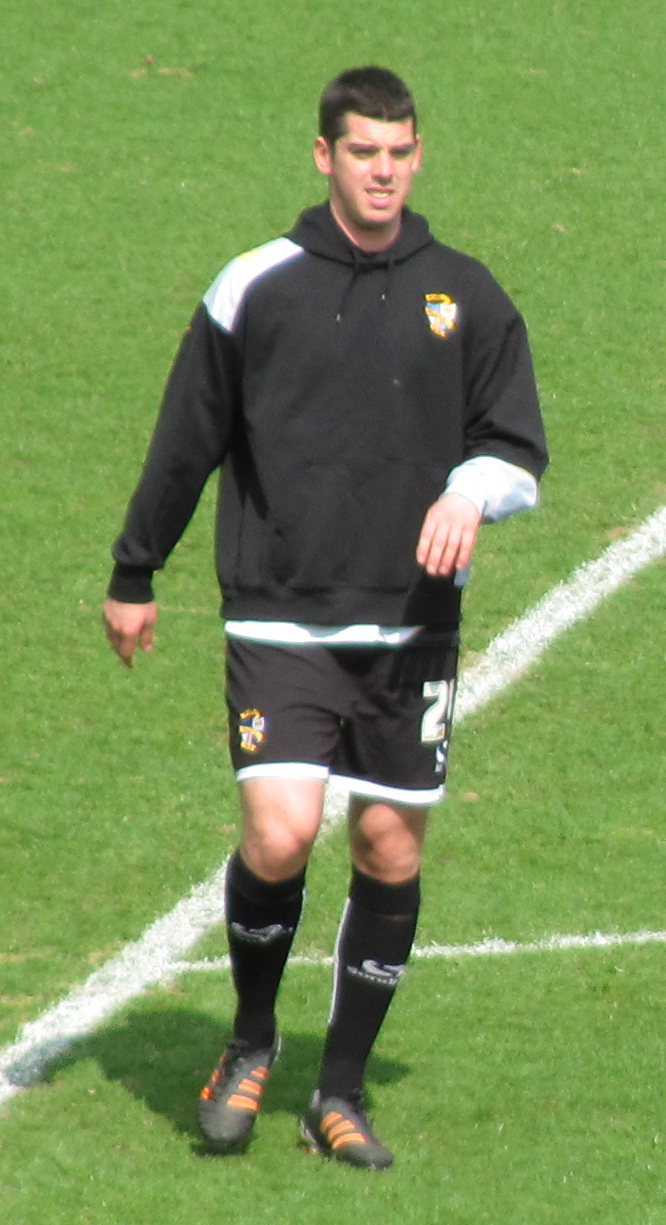
Richard Duffy made 29 appearances

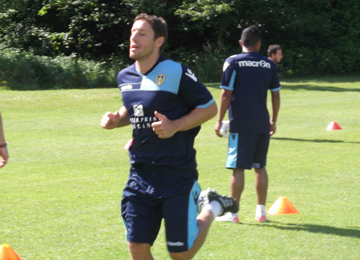
Michael Brown was a highly experienced new signing.

== Overview ==
=== League One ===
Manager Micky Adams ended months of speculation surrounded his future when he signed a 12-month rolling contract the following in June 2014. His first signing of the season was versatile left-sided player Colin Daniel. Kaid Mohamed left the club on loan, after he agreed to spend the season playing for Northampton Town. Adams admitted he was finding it difficult to sign new players to take the club forward after losing out on numerous transfer targets to rival clubs. Chairman Norman Smurthwaite was criticised by fans for showing a lack of ambition, but Smurthwaite defended his record by pointing to falling season ticket sales and the high amount of time and money he had invested in the club without financial reward. The second signing of the season was 24-year-old full-back Ryan McGivern, who negotiated a release from relegated Scottish Premier League club Hibernian in order to sign a two-year contract with the Vale. The third arrival was winger Mark Marshall, who had spent the latter half of the previous campaign with Coventry City after serving a two-year ban for taking performance-enhancing drugs. His next signing was winger Byron Moore, who turned down a contract offer at nearby Crewe Alexandra to join the Vale. This capture raised the tensions between Vale and Crewe, particularly after Adams and Crewe boss Steve Davis had a spat over the departure of his son Joe Davis; his father claiming Vale's contract offer to Joe was "derisory". Adams looked at a number of players on trial over the summer, including: Michael O’Connor, Steve Jennings, Javan Vidal, and Sylvestre Guyonet. Adams completed his squad on 18 July with a triple signing, taking on a trio of experienced midfielders: Michael Brown, Steve Jennings, and Michael O'Connor. He took the squad on a pre-season tour of Cornwall, including a stay at HMS Raleigh. Adams added to the squad by taking in versatile right-back Frédéric Veseli on a long-term loan from Ipswich Town. Carl Dickinson was appointed as club captain in August 2014, taking the armband from the departed Doug Loft.

Vale opened the season with a 1–1 draw at home to Walsall, with young goalkeeper Sam Johnson being favoured ahead of Chris Neal. An excellent away win followed as Vale picked up a 3–1 win at newly relegated Doncaster Rovers. Adams said this performance was as good as he had seen in an away game during his time as Vale manager. They remained unbeaten after picking up a 1–1 draw with Oldham Athletic at Boundary Park. Their unbeaten start to the season came to an end with a 2–0 home defeat to Notts County, with the Vale unable to turn round a 1–0 half-time deficit despite a strong attacking performance in the second half. To boost his attacking options, Adams then took in Blackburn Rovers striker Jordan Slew on loan until January. However, Adams went on to bemoan defensive errors as Chesterfield left Burslem with a 2–1 win following a bad-tempered encounter upon Daniel Jones's return to Vale Park. After the match opposition player Armand Gnanduillet was racially abused by a Vale supporter. Adams ended the month by signing French striker Achille Campion on loan from Swedish side Norrby IF.

A trip to London Road opened September for Vale, and Adams changed the team following the run of defeats, but league leaders Peterborough United proved too strong as they ran out 3–1 winners. The run of defeats was extended to five games on 13 September when local rivals Crewe Alexandra picked up their first points of the season. Following the defeat Adams told the media that his position would be under threat if results did not turn around quickly. Three days later league leaders Bristol City made it six defeats in a row by inflicting a 3–0 defeat on the Vale. This proved too much for Adams, who announced his resignation on 18 September. Rob Page stepped in as caretaker manager initially "until the end of October". His first game in charge saw the Vale beat Barnsley 2–1, Mark Marshall providing a deserved late winner with a mazy penalty box run. At Bradford City former Valiant Billy Knott gave away a penalty which was converted by Chris Lines, but a Mark Yeates free kick just before half-time levelled the scores. The defence was then bolstered with the signings of two loanee players: Guadeloupe international Stéphane Zubar from AFC Bournemouth, and 6 ft 5 in (1.96 m) Reiss Greenidge from West Bromwich Albion.

A trip to Fleetwood Town on 4 October proved fruitless after a late penalty gave Fleetwood a 1–0 win; Vale had played well and seemed to have done enough to earn a point despite playing much of the match with ten men after Slew was sent off for striking an opposition player. In search of a first clean sheet of the season, Page signed 19-year-old centre-back Remie Streete on loan from Newcastle United. Vale came out of the relegation zone on 11 October with a convincing 4–1 win over struggling Yeovil Town. A 2–0 defeat followed at Deepdale, with Zubar receiving a straight red card for lashing out at Preston North End's Joe Garner. After the game Page condemned Garner for play-acting throughout the match to try and get Vale player's sent off. The loan signings continued, as Leicester City's Saint Kitts and Nevis international striker Harry Panayiotou arrived on a one-month loan. The club were also in talks with former Premier League midfielder Isaiah Osbourne, who instead joined fellow relegation battlers Scunthorpe United. Ironically a few days later Scunthorpe then came to Burslem, as did the remnants of Hurricane Gonzalo, and the game ended 2–2 despite the Vale leading 2–1 and facing ten men after former player Jennison Myrie-Williams was sent off. The fifth signing of Page's reign then arrived in the form of French striker Dany N'Guessan, who signed a two-month deal. The signing came in good time as Tom Pope was later ruled out of action for a few weeks with a knee injury. Vale then beat Leyton Orient 3–0, keeping their first clean sheet of the season; Orient were reduced to ten men early in the first half after Darius Henderson was sent off for elbowing Richard Duffy. Having taken the club up seven league places within six weeks, Page was appointed as manager on a permanent basis on 29 October.

Vale opened November with three points at Colchester United; Neal saved a first-half penalty before Marshall and Daniel secured the goals in a 2–1 win. The search for talented young players continued, with Aziz Deen-Conteh and Enoch Andoh both joining the club on a trial basis. The clash with Rochdale on 15 November came amidst a defensive crisis as Streete was recalled from his loan and both Duffy and McGivern were suspended. The positive results kept coming however, as Vale moved into the top half of the table with a 1–0 win. Former Chelsea left-back Aziz Deen-Conteh then signed a deal with the club until 2017. Leaving the club, though only on a 28-day loan, was goalkeeper Sam Johnson, who went to Conference Premier side Alfreton Town. Not long after their FA Cup triumph at Vale Park, Milton Keynes Dons hosted the Vale and ran out 1–0 following a sending off to Chris Lines. Another two long-term prospects were then added in the form of Ghana youth international Enoch Andoh, who signed an 18-month contract, and former Manchester City striker Alex Nimely. The "Valiants" then ended the month with a 2–2 draw at Gillingham, Brown's 94th-minute equaliser securing a deserved point.

After a two-week break Vale hosted Coventry City on 13 December, and went on to lose the game 2–0 after failing to pose much of an attacking threat. They got back to winning ways the following week by beating struggling Crawley Town 2–1. The visitors on Boxing Day were Sheffield United, who were defeated 2–1 after referee Stuart Attwell sent off "Blades" defender Chris Basham and later gave Vale a penalty. Another tricky tie followed at Swindon Town, who went into the automatic promotion places after beating Vale 1–0.

Vale began 2015 with a home tie against Gillingham, and a victory took them to within a point of the play-offs thanks to a stoppage time winner from Colin Daniel. Shortly after Frédéric Veseli's loan signing from Ipswich was made into a permanent deal. Going forward Page managed to adequately cover for the continuing absence of Pope by playing Ben Williamson as a lone striker supported by Louis Dodds in a central attacking midfield role. The next week's opponents, Chesterfield, were one place above Vale, but a 3–0 Chesterfield win put Vale four points and four places outside the play-offs; both chairman and manager described the performance as "embarrassing". This proved to be a temporary setback however, as Vale went on to beat Peterborough 2–1. A win over "A500 derby" rivals Crewe would then take Vale into the play-offs, but a 1–0 win completed a double over Vale for the "Railwaymen"; Neal saved a penalty he himself gave away but could not keep out Nicky Ajose's 39th-minute strike. Next opponents Barnsley tried to buy Tom Pope before Vale's visit to Oakwell. Pope played against Barnsley but it was goalkeeper Neal who opened the scoring after fumbling into his own net just before half-time; Barnsley went on to win the game 2–1. Pope stayed put throughout the remainder of the transfer window, instead it was N'Guessan who departed, whilst Tommy O'Sullivan and Greg Luer arrived on loan.

Vale twice came from behind at home to Bradford on 7 February, Campion scoring the first equalizer before City goalkeeper Jordan Pickford was sent off in stoppage time for bringing down Birchall; O'Connor converted the resulting penalty. A trip to league leaders Bristol City followed, who demonstrated their superiority over the Vale with a 3–1 win. To bolster the defence Page signed 1.96 m (6 ft 5 in) teenage centre-back Ryan Inniss on a youth loan from Crystal Palace. The youngster made his debut at Walsall, helping Vale to a rare clean sheet as Tom Pope returned to the score-sheet. A second clean sheet followed in a 3–0 home win over Doncaster Rovers, as both Veseli and Moore opened their accounts with the club to complete the double over "Donny". A 1–0 win over Notts County extended the run of victories and clean sheets and took Vale to within three points of the play-offs.

March began poorly as managerless Oldham broke Vale's run of results with a 1–0 victory in a dour game. Vale then came from behind to win 3–2 at Coventry, moving themselves to within two points of the play-offs in the process. This proved to be Inniss's last game for the club, and Lines also left the club after the game, joining former club Bristol Rovers on loan. Swindon then dented Vale's promotion hopes with a 1–0 in Burslem, defending an eighth-minute lead from Brazilian defender Raphael Rossi Branco. Dodds twice put Vale ahead of Crawley, but the relegation-threatened visitors came from behind to win the game 3–2 to effectively end Vale's play-off hopes in front of just 3,852 supporters. Page said the performance was "embarrassing". Pope was dropped for the trip to Bramall Lane, though came on at half-time during a 1–0 defeat to Sheffield United. On deadline loan deal day, Page made a triple signing: Portuguese winger Francisco Júnior (Everton), Scottish defender Neill Collins (Sheffield United), and Senegalese attacker Mohamed Coulibaly (AFC Bournemouth). Francisco Júnior and Collins started at Leyton Orient, but a 1–0 lead turned into a 2–1 deficit following Chris Neal's sending off.

Second-from-bottom Colchester opened the Easter weekend with a 2–1 win at Vale Park, leaving Vale just four points above the relegation zone. Five changes were made for the trip to Rochdale, but a stoppage time goal from former Valiant Calvin Andrew condemned Vale to a sixth-successive defeat. The run of defeats was ended with a 0–0 draw at home to third-place Milton Keynes Dons. Richard Duffy then scored the first goal of his Vale career against Scunthorpe and secured a draw that took the club over the 50 point mark; however, a Kyle Wootton goal five minutes into stoppage time denied Vale the victory. Second-place Preston twice took the lead against Vale, but despite Duffy being sent off Vale came back with two Michael O'Connor penalties to claim an important point. Vale secured their League One status with 2–1 win at bottom-club Yeovil, ending a run of nine games without a win. This left the final game against Fleetwood as a formality, as Vale fell to a 2–1 defeat.

The first departure announced at the end of the campaign was from the coaching staff, with Mark Grew standing down after 25 years at Vale Park. Of the playing staff only three players were not offered new contracts: Chris Robertson, Kaid Mohamed and Alex Nimely. Star striker Tom Pope chose to leave the club, rejecting an offer of a 50% pay cut in favour of a move to newly promoted Bury. The next player to depart was strike partner Ben Williamson, who left for Gillingham. Chris Lines had his contract cancelled in order to join Bristol Rovers on a permanent basis and free up the wage budget for Page. Full-back Frédéric Veseli and star winger Mark Marshall also left the club after rejecting new contract offers.

=== Finances & ownership issues ===
PVFC Limited, the club's holding company, was hit with a winding-up order by HM Revenue and Customs in July 2014; chairman Norman Smurthwaite insisted this would not affect the club and that a funding error caused the problem and expected the order to be withdrawn. Smurthwaite continued to affect changes at the club, controversially axing the system of door-to-door lottery collectors and banishing the Port Vale Community Trust out of Vale Park; the charity subsequently was offered a rent-free tenancy at the Touch building in Trinity Street, Hanley by Vale supporter Jason Nixon who also stated that he had business contacts interested in buying the club.

Smurthwaite invested £500,000 into the playing budget in order to help Micky Adams strengthen the squad. Despite not wanting him to resign, once Adams left the club Smurthwaite initiated a policy of experimenting with young players in the hope of turning a profit from player sales in the future. Smurthwaite did cause controversy however, by telling a reporter that supporters who only attended away matches (due partly to Vale Park's high ticket costs) "disgusted" him and that they should "go and support another club".

In February, the home game with Doncaster Rovers was put into doubt after Smurthwaite refused to pay extra policing costs that Staffordshire Police had demanded following intelligence that there would be troublemakers instigating violence at the game. Smurthwaite denied Staffordshire Police and Crime Commissioner Matthew Ellis's claim that Smurthwaite threatened to close the club down during the dispute, but retracted his threat to bar police officers from entering the ground during the match. Smurthwaite cancelled an expensive arranged loan deal for an unnamed Premier League player in March after being disappointment with low home attendances; he stated "I feel like I am banging my head against a brick wall with it all." An e-mail sent from Smurthwaite's account claimed that he was looking to sell the club and would invest no further money in the club, but he claimed his account had been hacked and that the e-mail was a hoax.

=== Cup competitions ===
A tricky draw in the first round left Vale facing Milton Keynes Dons; the game proved to be an entertaining one, but despite Dany N'Guessan scoring two goals, he ended up on the losing side as the Dons ran out 4–3 winners.

Vale made progress in the League Cup by beating League Two side Hartlepool United 6–2 in the first round, Ben Williamson scoring a hat-trick within the space of ten minutes. Their second round opponents were newly relegated Championship side Cardiff City, who ran out 3–2 victors with former Manchester United striker Federico Macheda marking his debut with a brace; the highlight for Vale was a 40 yards (37 m) goal from Michael O'Connor.

After a bye in the first round of the Football League Trophy, Vale faced a tricky tie with Preston North End at Deepdale. Tom Pope cancelled out Chris Humphrey early strike, but the game was won in the 63rd minute by a deft chipped goal from Joe Garner, with Paul Gallagher and Tom Pope completing the scoring to make it 3–2 to the "Lambs".

== Results ==
=== Pre-season ===
12 July 2014 Friendly	Newcastle Town	0–6	Port Vale	Newcastle-under-Lyme
		Report	Lines 13'; Daniel 33'; Lloyd 55', 57'; Williamson 77'; Vidal 80'	Stadium: Lyme Valley Stadium; Attendance: 2,360

14 July 2014 Friendly	Alsager Town	0–8	Port Vale	Alsager
19:30 BST		Report	McGivern 11'; Marshall 20'; Lines 43' (pen.); Haughton 50'; Pope 57', 68'; Boot 81'; Morris 84'	Stadium: Wood Park Stadium

15 July 2014 Friendly	Norton United	0–1	Port Vale	Smallthorne
		Report	Pope 10'	Stadium: Norton Cricket Club & Miners Welfare Institute

19 July 2014 Friendly	Alfreton Town	1–2	Port Vale	Alfreton
15:00	Jackson 5'	Report	Lloyd 18'; Dickinson 45+1'	Stadium: North Street; Attendance: 301

21 July 2014 Friendly	Plymouth Parkway	0–4	Port Vale	Plymouth
19:30 BST		Report	Marshall 8'; Dickinson 25'; Williamson 85'; McGivern 87'	Stadium: Bolitho Park; Attendance: 565

23 July 2014 Friendly	Bodmin Town	1–4	Port Vale	Bodmin
19:30 BST	Shepherd 74'	Report	Birchall 2'; Williamson 11'; Daniel 40'; Marshall 81'	Stadium: Priory Park; Referee: Andrew Quinn

26 July 2014 Friendly	Tiverton Town	1–1	Port Vale	Tiverton, Devon
15:00 BST	Mudge 11'	Report	Williamson 83'	Stadium: Ladysmead

30 July 2014 Friendly	Port Vale	1–2	Bolton Wanderers	Burslem
19:45 BST	Pope 84'	Report	Mills 7'; Beckford 77'	Stadium: Vale Park; Attendance: 1,780

2 August 2014 Friendly	Southport	4–2	Port Vale	Southport
15:00 BST	Brodie 13'; Brogan 51' (pen.); Foster 60'; Joyce 90'	Report	Foster 64' (og.); Williamson 68'	Stadium: Haig Avenue; Attendance: 514

5 August 2014 Friendly	Port Vale	3–2	West Bromwich Albion	Burslem
19:45 BST	Williamson 19'; Pope 27'; Dawson 85' (og.)	Report	Roofe 4'; Garmston 49'	Stadium: Vale Park; Attendance: 2,145; Referee: Rob Lewis

=== Football League One ===
==== League table ====
Pos	Team	Pld	W	D	L	GF	GA	GD	Pts
16	Scunthorpe United	46	14	14	18	62	75	−13	56
17	Coventry City	46	13	16	17	49	60	−11	55
18	Port Vale	46	15	9	22	55	65	−10	54
19	Colchester United	46	14	10	22	58	77	−19	52
20	Crewe Alexandra	46	14	10	22	43	75	−32	52

Updated to match(es) played on 3 May 2015. Source: BBC Sport
Rules for classification: 1) Points; 2) Goal difference; 3) Number of goals scored

==== Results by matchday ====
Round	1	2	3	4	5	6	7	8	9	10	11	12	13	14	15	16	17	18	19	20	21	22	23	24	25	26	27	28	29	30	31	32	33	34	35	36	37	38	39	40	41	42	43	44	45	46
Ground	H	A	A	H	H	A	A	H	H	A	A	H	A	H	H	A	H	A	A	H	A	H	A	H	A	H	H	A	H	A	A	H	A	H	A	H	H	A	A	H	A	H	A	H	A	H
Result	D	W	D	L	L	L	L	L	W	D	L	W	L	D	W	W	W	L	D	L	W	W	L	W	L	W	L	L	D	L	W	W	W	L	W	L	L	L	L	L	L	D	D	D	W	L
Position	13	7	9	16	18	20	22	23	21	22	22	19	22	18	16	13	12	15	14	16	15	12	15	8	10	9	12	14	14	17	12	10	9	13	11	12	13	14	15	15	16	18	18	16	17	18
Points	1	4	5	5	5	5	5	5	8	9	9	12	12	13	16	19	22	22	23	23	26	29	29	32	32	35	35	35	36	36	39	42	45	45	48	48	48	48	48	48	48	49	50	51	54	54

Source: Statto
A = Away; H = Home; W = Win; D = Draw; L = Loss

==== Matches ====
9 August 2014 1	Port Vale	1–1	Walsall	Burslem
15:00 BST	Pope 25'	Report	Bradshaw 59'	Stadium: Vale Park; Attendance: 7,050; Referee: Darren Bond; Assistant referees: David Benton, Peter Gooch; Fourth official: Kevin Morris

16 August 2014 2	Doncaster Rovers	1–3	Port Vale	Doncaster
15:00 BST	Bennett 74'	Report	Williamson 27'; Pope 39'; Dickinson 41'	Stadium: Keepmoat Stadium; Attendance: 6,437; Referee: Geoff Eltringham; Assistant referees: William Smallwood, Darren Strain; Fourth official: Ricky Wootton

19 August 2014 3	Oldham Athletic	1–1	Port Vale	Oldham
19:45 BST	Wilson 64'	Report	Pope 8'	Stadium: Boundary Park; Attendance: 3,592; Referee: Kevin Wright; Assistant referees: Matthew Parry, Stephen Wade; Fourth official: Philip Dermott

23 August 2014 4	Port Vale	0–2	Notts County	Burslem
15:00 BST		Report	Jones 11'; Noble 87'	Stadium: Vale Park; Attendance: 5,090; Referee: Mark Brown; Assistant referees: Michael Denton, Wayne Grunnill; Fourth official: Michael Bull

30 August 2014 5	Port Vale	1–2	Chesterfield	Burslem
15:00 BST	Marshall 41'	Report	Doyle 9'; Roberts 46'	Stadium: Vale Park; Attendance: Jeremy Simpson; Referee: 5,593; Assistant referees: Nick Hobbis, Timothy Wood; Fourth official: Dumitru-Ravel Cheosiaua

6 September 2014 6	Peterborough United	3–1	Port Vale	Peterborough
15:00 BST	Maddison 30'; Vassell 72'; Payne 79'	Report	Slew 83'	Stadium: London Road Stadium; Attendance: 6,024; Referee: James Linington; Assistant referees: Stuart Eagland, Keith Lawson; Fourth official: John Farries

13 September 2014 7	Crewe Alexandra	2–1	Port Vale	Crewe
15:00 BST	Ray 6'; Oliver 19'	Report	Slew 32'	Stadium: Gresty Road; Attendance: 6,357; Referee: Simon Hooper; Assistant referees: Joe Clark, Anthony Tankard; Fourth official: David Plowright

16 September 2014 8	Port Vale	0–3	Bristol City	Burslem
19:45 BST		Report	Wilbraham 13', 61'; Flint 48'	Stadium: Vale Park; Attendance: 4,050; Referee: Andy Woolmer; Assistant referees: Ian Dudley, Paul Graham; Fourth official: Danny Gratton

20 September 2014 9	Port Vale	2–1	Barnsley	Burslem
15:00 BST	O'Connor 24'; Marshall 89'	Report	Hourihane 59' (pen.)	Stadium: Vale Park; Attendance: 5,415; Referee: Dean Whitestone; Assistant referees: Philip Dermott, Robert Jones; Fourth official: Steven Copeland

27 September 2014 10	Bradford City	1–1	Port Vale	Bradford
15:00 BST	Yeates 45+3'	Report	Lines 12' (pen.)	Stadium: Valley Parade; Attendance: 12,703; Referee: Seb Stockbridge; Assistant referees: Barry Gordon, Stephen Wade; Fourth official: Paul Cook

4 October 2014 11	Fleetwood Town	1–0	Port Vale	Fleetwood
15:00 BST	Dobbie 80' (pen.)	Report		Stadium: Highbury Stadium; Attendance: 4,196; Referee: Kevin Johnson; Assistant referees: Christopher Akers, Ben Toner; Fourth official: Andy Scregg

11 October 2014 12	Port Vale	4–1	Yeovil Town	Burslem
15:00 BST	Pope 18', 29'; Lines 46'; Daniel 90'	Report	Martin 86'	Stadium: Vale Park; Attendance: 4,798; Referee: Darren Handley; Assistant referees: Bob Roberts, James Wilson; Fourth official: Gary Hilton

18 October 2014 13	Preston North End	2–0	Port Vale	Preston, Lancashire
15:00 BST	Gallagher 42'; Browne 81'	Report		Stadium: Deepdale; Attendance: 9,381; Referee: Mick Russell; Assistant referees: Nicholas Barnard, Alf Greenwood; Fourth official: Paul Kettlewell

21 October 2014 14	Port Vale	2–2	Scunthorpe United	Burslem
19:45 BST	Williamson 7'; Birchall 70'	Report	Bishop 4'; Taylor 79'	Stadium: Vale Park; Attendance: 3,590; Referee: James Adcock; Assistant referees: Stuart Eagland, Nigel Smith; Fourth official: Michael D'Aguilar

25 October 2014 15	Port Vale	3–0	Leyton Orient	Burslem
15:00 BST	Yates 63'; Williamson 66'; Clarke 81' (og.)	Report		Stadium: Vale Park; Attendance: 4,773; Referee: Lee Collins; Assistant referees: Robert Atkin, Mark Griffiths; Fourth official: Michael Hanley

1 November 2014 16	Colchester United	1–2	Port Vale	Colchester
15:00 GMT	Sears 79'	Report	Marshall 56'; Daniel 60'	Stadium: Colchester Community Stadium; Attendance: 3,571; Referee: Trevor Kettle; Assistant referees: Darren Blunden, Ian Fissenden; Fourth official: Elliott Kaye

15 November 2014 17	Port Vale	1–0	Rochdale	Burslem
15:00 GMT	Brown 64'	Report		Stadium: Vale Park; Attendance: 5,043; Referee: Graham Horwood; Assistant referees: Richard Bartlett, Mark Russell; Fourth official: James Adcock

22 November 2014 18	Milton Keynes Dons	1–0	Port Vale	Milton Keynes
15:00 GMT	Baker 3'	Report		Stadium: Stadium MK; Attendance: 12,007; Referee: Gary Sutton; Assistant referees: Steven Meredith, Anthony Tankard; Fourth official: Darren Deadman

29 November 2014 19	Gillingham	2–2	Port Vale	Gillingham, Kent
15:00 GMT	Egan 29', 55'	Report	N'Guessan 18'; Brown 90+4'	Stadium: Priestfield Stadium; Attendance: 4,799; Referee: Brendan Malone; Assistant referees: David Avent, Adrian Sannerude; Fourth official: Alan Dale

13 December 2014 20	Port Vale	0–2	Coventry City	Burslem
15:00 GMT		Report	Johnson 57'; Madine 90+5'	Stadium: Vale Park; Attendance: 5,321; Referee: Mark Heywood; Assistant referees: Peter Gooch, Guy Stretton; Fourth official: Nick Hobbis

20 December 2014 21	Crawley Town	1–2	Port Vale	Crawley
15:00 GMT	Henderson 88'	Report	Brown 30'; Dodds 42'	Stadium: Broadfield Stadium; Attendance: 2,320; Referee: Tim Robinson; Assistant referees: Nick Kinseley, Rob Smith; Fourth official: Gavin Muge

26 December 2014 22	Port Vale	2–1	Sheffield United	Burslem
15:00 GMT	Williamson 16'; N'Guessan	Report	Campbell-Ryce 55'	Stadium: Vale Park; Attendance: 8,524; Referee: Stuart Attwell; Assistant referees: Matthew Corlett, Anthony Tankard; Fourth official: Robert Atkin

28 December 2014 23	Swindon Town	1–0	Port Vale	Swindon
15:00 GMT	Williams 56'	Report		Stadium: County Ground; Attendance: 9,248; Referee: Darren Sheldrake; Assistant referees: Stephen Daly, Brian Durie; Fourth official: Marvyn Amphlett

3 January 2015 24	Port Vale	2–1	Gillingham	Burslem
15:00 GMT	Williamson 11'; Daniel 90+3'	Report	McDonald 31'	Stadium: Vale Park; Attendance: 4,783; Referee: Fred Graham; Assistant referees: Mark Griffiths, David Plowright; Fourth official: Nigel Smith

10 January 2015 25	Chesterfield	3–0	Port Vale	Chesterfield, Derbyshire
15:00 GMT	Gnanduillet 13'; Doyle 60' (pen.); Raglan 70'	Report		Stadium: Proact Stadium; Attendance: 7,034; Referee: Darren Bond; Assistant referees: Christopher Akers, Mark Howes; Fourth official: Joe Clark

17 January 2015 26	Port Vale	2–1	Peterborough United	Burslem
15:00 GMT	Birchall 32'; Williamson 47'	Report	Washington 21'	Stadium: Vale Park; Attendance: 4,446; Referee: Carl Berry; Assistant referees: David Benton, Michael Hanley; Fourth official: David Plowright

24 January 2015 27	Port Vale	0–1	Crewe Alexandra	Burslem
15:00 GMT		Report	Ajose 39'	Stadium: Vale Park; Attendance: 8,002; Referee: Gavin Ward; Assistant referees: Ian Dudley, Stephen Ross; Fourth official: Steven Copeland

31 January 2015 28	Barnsley	2–1	Port Vale	Barnsley
15:00 GMT	Neal 45+2' (og.); Pearson 47'	Report	Daniel 66'	Stadium: Oakwell; Attendance: 8,660; Referee: Graham Salisbury; Assistant referees: Richard Bartlett, Stephen Wade; Fourth official: Paul Marsden

7 February 2015 29	Port Vale	2–2	Bradford City	Burslem
15:00 GMT	Campion 58'; O'Connor 90+4'	Report	Hanson 41'; Morais 65'	Stadium: Vale Park; Attendance: 5,205; Referee: Michael Bull; Assistant referees: Dumitru-Ravel Cheosiaua, Bob Roberts; Fourth official: Jonathan Hunt

10 February 2015 30	Bristol City	3–1	Port Vale	Ashton Gate, Bristol
19:45 GMT	Emmanuel-Thomas 34'; Bryan 59'; Smith 67'	Report	Marshall 77'	Stadium: Ashton Gate; Attendance: 10,891; Referee: Brendan Malone; Assistant referees: Brett Huxtable, Adam Matthews; Fourth official: Justin Amey

14 February 2015 31	Walsall	0–1	Port Vale	Walsall
15:00 GMT		Report	Pope 28'	Stadium: Bescot Stadium; Attendance: 4,504; Referee: Andy D'Urso; Assistant referees: Declan Ford, Geoff Law; Fourth official: Paul Thompson

21 February 2015 32	Port Vale	3–0	Doncaster Rovers	Burslem
15:00 GMT	Marshall 7'; Veseli 38'; Moore 87'	Report		Stadium: Vale Park; Attendance: 5,713; Referee: Keith Stroud; Assistant referees: Ryan Johnson, Paul Rees; Fourth official: Andy Scregg

28 February 2015 33	Notts County	0–1	Port Vale	Nottingham
15:00 GMT		Report	Marshall 7'	Stadium: Meadow Lane; Attendance: 5,179; Referee: Darren Drysdale; Assistant referees: Mathew Buonassisi, Nick Hobbis; Fourth official: Ian Rathbone

3 March 2015 34	Port Vale	0–1	Oldham Athletic	Burslem
19:45 GMT		Report	Jones 42'	Stadium: Vale Park; Attendance: 4,423; Referee: David Webb; Assistant referees: Christopher Akers, James Mainwaring; Fourth official: Wayne Barratt

7 March 2015 35	Coventry City	2–3	Port Vale	Coventry
15:00 GMT	O'Brien 4'; Odelusi 70'	Report	Pope 40'; Marshall 45'; O'Connor 76'	Stadium: Ricoh Arena; Attendance: 9,446; Referee: Mick Russell; Assistant referees: Christopher Powell, Richard Wigglesworth; Fourth official: Mark Haywood

14 March 2015 36	Port Vale	0–1	Swindon Town	Burslem
15:00 GMT		Report	Rossi Branco 8'	Stadium: Vale Park; Attendance: 5,120; Referee: Andy Madley; Assistant referees: Barry Cropp, Steven Meredith; Fourth official: Matthew Parry

17 March 2015 37	Port Vale	2–3	Crawley Town	Burslem
19:45 GMT	Dodds 4', 45'	Report	Wordsworth 43'; McLeod 56'; Wood 69'	Stadium: Vale Park; Attendance: 3,852; Referee: Kevin Wright; Assistant referees: Kevin Mattocks, David Storrie; Fourth official: Mark Dwyer

21 March 2015 38	Sheffield United	1–0	Port Vale	Sheffield
15:00 GMT	Baxter 29' (pen.)	Report		Stadium: Bramall Lane; Attendance: 18,729; Referee: Jeremy Simpson; Assistant referees: Robert Merchant, Stephen Wade; Fourth official: Robert Atkin

28 March 2015 39	Leyton Orient	3–1	Port Vale	Leyton, East London
15:00 GMT	Mooney 55' (pen.); Collins 61' (og.); Cox 84'	Report	Birchall 28'	Stadium: Brisbane Road; Attendance: 5,623; Referee: Darren Handley; Assistant referees: Nicholas Cooper, Christopher O'Donnell; Fourth official: Ian Fissenden

3 April 2015 40	Port Vale	1–2	Colchester United	Burslem
15:00 BST	Dodds 84'	Report	Moncur 57'; Murphy 77'	Stadium: Vale Park; Attendance: 4,471; Referee: Charles Breakspear; Assistant referees: Mark Griffiths, William Smallwood; Fourth official: Matthew Jones

6 April 2015 41	Rochdale	1–0	Port Vale	Rochdale
15:00 BST	Andrew 90+4'	Report		Stadium: Spotland Stadium; Attendance: 2,948; Referee: Andy Haines; Assistant referees: Alix Pashley, Neil Sharp; Fourth official: Bob Roberts

11 April 2015 42	Port Vale	0–0	Milton Keynes Dons	Burslem
15:00 BST		Report		Stadium: Vale Park; Attendance: 4,379; Referee: Nigel Miller; Assistant referees: Matthew Bristow, Declan Ford; Fourth official: Paul Thompson

14 April 2015 43	Scunthorpe United	1–1	Port Vale	Scunthorpe
19:45 BST	Wootton 90+5'	Report	Duffy 43'	Stadium: Glanford Park; Attendance: 3,002; Referee: Trevor Kettle; Assistant referees: Graeme Fyvie, Nick Greenhalgh; Fourth official: Paul Graham

17 April 2015 44	Port Vale	2–2	Preston North End	Burslem
19:45 BST	O'Connor 52' (pen.), 85' (pen.)	Report	Johnson 12'; Garner 59' (pen.)	Stadium: Vale Park; Attendance: 7,210; Referee: Richard Clark; Assistant referees: Marvyn Amphlett, Nick Gibbons; Fourth official: Jason Tyas

25 April 2015 45	Yeovil Town	1–2	Port Vale	Yeovil
15:00 BST	Ugwu 80'	Report	Pope 13'; Brown 82'	Stadium: Huish Park; Attendance: 4,127; Referee: Graham Scott; Assistant referees: Andrew Laver, Steven Plane; Fourth official: Mark Pottage

3 May 2015 46	Port Vale	1–2	Fleetwood Town	Burslem
12:15 BST	O'Connor 90+4'	Report	Morris 17'; Roberts 26'	Stadium: Vale Park; Attendance: 5,355; Referee: Keith Hill; Fourth official: Karl Evans

=== FA Cup ===
8 November 2014 R1	Port Vale F.C.	3–4	Milton Keynes Dons	Burslem
15:00 GMT	Spence 11' (og.); N'Guessan 44', 85'	Report	Afobe 31', 59' (pen.); Baker 40'; Green 81'	Stadium: Vale Park; Attendance: 4,120; Referee: Charles Breakspear

=== League Cup ===
12 August 2014 R1	Port Vale	6–2	Hartlepool United	Burslem
19:45 BST	Williamson 8', 14', 18'; Brown 62'; Pope 74', 84'	Report	Franks 10'; Austin 59' (pen.)	Stadium: Vale Park; Attendance: 2,824; Referee: Graham Scott

26 August 2014 R2	Port Vale	2–3	Cardiff City	Burslem
19:45 BST	O'Connor 34'; Brown 90+3'	Report	Ralls 26'; Macheda 60', 79'	Stadium: Vale Park; Attendance: 4,390; Referee: David Webb

=== Football League Trophy ===
7 October 2014 R2	Preston North End	3–2	Port Vale	Preston
19:45 BST	Humphrey 13'; Garner 63'; Gallagher 69'	Report	Pope 51', 89'	Stadium: Deepdale; Attendance: 3,836; Referee: Peter Bankes

== Squad statistics ==
=== Appearances and goals ===
Key to positions: GK – Goalkeeper; DF – Defender; MF – Midfielder; FW – Forward

No.	Pos	Nat	Player	Total		League One		FA Cup		League Cup		Football League Trophy	
No.	Pos	Nat	Player	Apps	Goals	Apps	Goals	Apps	Goals	Apps	Goals	Apps	Goals
1	GK	(England) ENG	Chris Neal	43	0	40	0	1	0	1	0	1	0
2	DF	(England) ENG	Adam Yates	28	1	25	1	1	0	1	0	1	0
3	DF	(England) ENG	Carl Dickinson	46	1	43	1	0	0	2	0	1	0
4	DF	(Scotland) SCO	Chris Robertson	26	0	24	0	0	0	2	0	0	0
5	DF	(Northern Ireland) NIR	Ryan McGivern	23	0	20	0	1	0	2	0	0	0
6	DF	(Wales) WAL	Richard Duffy	29	1	27	1	1	0	0	0	1	0
7	MF	(Trinidad and Tobago) TTO	Chris Birchall	30	3	27	3	1	0	1	0	1	0
8	FW	(England) ENG	Louis Dodds	41	4	37	4	1	0	2	0	1	0
9	FW	(England) ENG	Ben Williamson	47	9	43	6	1	0	2	3	1	0
10	MF	(England) ENG	Chris Lines	31	2	27	2	1	0	2	0	1	0
11	FW	(England) ENG	Tom Pope	36	12	33	8	0	0	2	2	1	2
12	GK	(England) ENG	Sam Johnson	8	0	7	0	0	0	1	0	0	0
14	MF	(England) ENG	Colin Daniel	30	4	28	4	1	0	1	0	0	0
15	MF	(Northern Ireland) NIR	Michael O'Connor	47	7	44	6	1	0	2	1	0	0
16	DF	(Scotland) SCO	Neill Collins	7	0	7	0	0	0	0	0	0	0
17	MF	(England) ENG	Michael Brown	39	6	36	4	0	0	2	2	1	0
18	MF	(Wales) WAL	Tommy O'Sullivan	5	0	5	0	0	0	0	0	0	0
19	MF	(England) ENG	Byron Moore	18	1	15	1	1	0	1	0	1	0
20	MF	(Jamaica) JAM	Mark Marshall	49	7	46	7	1	0	1	0	1	0
21	DF	(Albania) ALB	Frédéric Veseli	38	1	37	1	0	0	1	0	0	0
22	MF	(England) ENG	Ryan Lloyd	0	0	0	0	0	0	0	0	0	0
23	GK	(England) ENG	Ryan Boot	0	0	0	0	0	0	0	0	0	0
24	DF	(England) ENG	Nathan Smith	0	0	0	0	0	0	0	0	0	0
25	MF	(Senegal) SEN	Mohamed Coulibaly	4	0	4	0	0	0	0	0	0	0
26	FW	(Liberia) LBR	Alex Nimely	1	0	1	0	0	0	0	0	0	0
27	MF	(Ghana) GHA	Enoch Andoh	0	0	0	0	0	0	0	0	0	0
28	FW	(France) FRA	Achille Campion	12	1	12	1	0	0	0	0	0	0
29	MF	(Wales) WAL	Kaid Mohamed	0	0	0	0	0	0	0	0	0	0
33	MF	(Portugal) POR	Francisco Júnior	1	0	1	0	0	0	0	0	0	0
38	DF	(Sierra Leone) SLE	Aziz Deen-Conteh	0	0	0	0	0	0	0	0	0	0
Players who featured but departed the club during the season:
16	DF	(Guyana) GUY	Reiss Greenidge	0	0	0	0	0	0	0	0	0	0
16	FW	(England) ENG	Greg Luer	2	0	2	0	0	0	0	0	0	0
18	MF	(England) ENG	Steve Jennings	6	0	4	0	0	0	2	0	0	0
25	FW	(England) ENG	Jordan Slew	9	2	9	2	0	0	0	0	0	0
26	DF	(England) ENG	Remie Streete	3	0	2	0	1	0	0	0	0	0
27	FW	(Saint Kitts and Nevis) SKN	Harry Panayiotou	0	0	0	0	0	0	0	0	0	0
32	DF	(Guadeloupe) GLP	Stéphane Zubar	3	0	2	0	0	0	0	0	1	0
33	FW	(France) FRA	Dany N'Guessan	12	4	11	2	1	2	0	0	0	0
33	DF	(England) ENG	Ryan Inniss	5	0	5	0	0	0	0	0	0	0

=== Top scorers ===
Place	Position	Nation	Number	Name	League One	FA Cup	League Cup	Football League Trophy	Total
1	FW	England	11	Tom Pope	8	0	2	2	12
2	FW	England	9	Ben Williamson	6	0	3	0	9
3	MF	Jamaica	20	Mark Marshall	7	0	0	0	7
–	MF	Northern Ireland	15	Michael O'Connor	6	0	1	0	7
5	MF	England	17	Michael Brown	4	0	2	0	6
6	MF	England	14	Colin Daniel	4	0	0	0	4
–	FW	England	8	Louis Dodds	4	0	0	0	4
–	FW	France	33	Dany N'Guessan	2	2	0	0	4
9	MF	Trinidad	7	Chris Birchall	3	0	0	0	3
10	MF	England	10	Chris Lines	2	0	0	0	2
–	FW	England	25	Jordan Slew	2	0	0	0	2
12	FW	France	28	Achille Campion	1	0	0	0	1
–	DF	England	3	Carl Dickinson	1	0	0	0	1
–	DF	Wales	6	Richard Duffy	1	0	0	0	1
–	MF	England	19	Byron Moore	1	0	0	0	1
–	DF	Albania	21	Frédéric Veseli	1	0	0	0	1
–	DF	England	2	Adam Yates	1	0	0	0	1
–				Own goals	1	1	0	0	2
				TOTALS	55	3	8	2	68

=== Disciplinary record ===
Number	Nation	Position	Name	League One		FA Cup		League Cup		League Trophy		Total	
Number	Nation	Position	Name	Yellow card	Red card	Yellow card	Red card	Yellow card	Red card	Yellow card	Red card	Yellow card	Red card
6	Wales	DF	Richard Duffy	8	1	1	0	0	0	0	0	9	1
17	England	MF	Michael Brown	6	1	0	0	0	0	1	0	7	1
1	England	GK	Chris Neal	5	1	0	0	0	0	0	0	5	1
10	England	MF	Chris Lines	2	1	0	0	0	0	0	0	2	1
32	Guadeloupe	DF	Stéphane Zubar	0	1	0	0	0	0	1	0	1	1
25	England	FW	Jordan Slew	0	1	0	0	0	0	0	0	0	1
3	England	DF	Carl Dickinson	8	0	0	0	0	0	1	0	9	0
15	Northern Ireland	MF	Michael O'Connor	8	0	0	0	0	0	0	0	8	0
8	England	FW	Louis Dodds	5	0	0	0	1	0	0	0	6	0
5	Northern Ireland	DF	Ryan McGivern	5	0	1	0	0	0	0	0	6	0
11	England	FW	Tom Pope	6	0	0	0	0	0	0	0	6	0
21	Albania	DF	Frédéric Veseli	6	0	0	0	0	0	0	0	6	0
33	England	DF	Ryan Inniss	5	0	0	0	0	0	0	0	5	0
20	Jamaica	MF	Mark Marshall	5	0	0	0	0	0	0	0	5	0
4	Scotland	DF	Chris Robertson	3	0	0	0	0	0	0	0	3	0
7	Trinidad	MF	Chris Birchall	2	0	0	0	0	0	0	0	2	0
16	Scotland	DF	Neill Collins	1	0	0	0	0	0	0	0	1	0
14	England	MF	Colin Daniel	1	0	0	0	0	0	0	0	1	0
33	England	MF	Francisco Júnior	1	0	0	0	0	0	0	0	1	0
18	England	MF	Steve Jennings	1	0	0	0	0	0	0	0	1	0
9	England	FW	Ben Williamson	1	0	0	0	0	0	0	0	1	0
			TOTALS	79	6	2	0	1	0	3	0	85	6

Sourced from Soccerway.

== Awards ==
End of Season Awards	Winner
Player of the Year	Michael O'Connor
Away Travel Player of the Year	Mark Marshall
Supporters' Club's Trophy	Michael O'Connor
Players' Player of the Year	Michael O'Connor
Youth Player of the Year	Jonny Kapend
Goal of the Season	Michael O'Connor (vs Cardiff City, 26 August 2014)

== Transfers ==
=== Transfers in ===
Date from	Position	Nationality	Name	From	Fee	Ref.
2 June 2014	MF	ENG	Colin Daniel	Mansfield Town	Free transfer	
30 June 2014	DF	NIR	Ryan McGivern	(Scotland) Hibernian	Undisclosed	
2 July 2014	MF	JAM	Mark Marshall	Coventry City	Free transfer	
3 July 2014	MF	ENG	Byron Moore	Crewe Alexandra	Free transfer	
18 July 2014	MF	ENG	Michael Brown	Leeds United	Free transfer	
18 July 2014	MF	ENG	Steve Jennings	Tranmere Rovers	Free transfer	
18 July 2014	MF	NIR	Michael O'Connor	Rotherham United	Free transfer	
23 October 2014	MF	FRA	Dany N'Guessan	Swindon Town	Free transfer	
17 November 2014	DF	SLE	Aziz Deen-Conteh	(Greece) Ergotelis	Free transfer	
25 November 2014	MF	GHA	Enoch Andoh	(Cyprus) AEL Limassol	Free transfer	
27 November 2014	FW	LBR	Alex Nimely	Manchester City	Free transfer	
2 January 2015	FW	FRA	Achille Campion	(Sweden) Norrby IF	Undisclosed	
7 January 2015	DF	ALB	Frédéric Veseli	Ipswich Town	Free transfer	

=== Transfers out ===
Date from	Position	Nationality	Name	To	Fee	Ref.
6 January 2015	FW	ENG	Steve Jennings	Tranmere Rovers	Free transfer	
2 February 2015	MF	FRA	Dany N'Guessan	(Greece) AEL	Free transfer	
9 May 2015	DF	SCO	Chris Robertson	(Scotland) Ross County	Released	
9 May 2015	MF	WAL	Kaid Mohamed	(Wales) Port Talbot Town	Released	
9 May 2015	FW	LBR	Alex Nimely	(Romania) Poli Timișoara	Released	
9 June 2015	FW	ENG	Tom Pope	Bury	Rejected contract	
15 June 2015	FW	ENG	Ben Williamson	Gillingham	Rejected contract	
30 June 2015	MF	ENG	Chris Lines	Bristol Rovers	Released	
30 June 2015	DF	ALB	Frédéric Veseli	(Switzerland) FC Lugano	Rejected contract	
30 June 2015	MF	JAM	Mark Marshall	Bradford City	Rejected contract	

=== Loans in ===
Start date	Position	Nationality	Name	From	End date	Ref.
29 July 2014	DF	ALB	Frédéric Veseli	Ipswich Town	4 January 2015	
29 August 2014	FW	ENG	Jordan Slew	Blackburn Rovers	3 January 2015	
1 September 2014	FW	FRA	Achille Campion	Sweden Norrby IF	1 January 2015	
29 September 2014	DF	GPE	Stéphane Zubar	AFC Bournemouth	27 October 2014	
29 September 2014	DF	GUY	Reiss Greenidge	West Bromwich Albion	31 December 2014	
9 October 2014	DF	ENG	Remie Streete	Newcastle United	12 November 2014	
20 October 2014	FW	SKN	Harry Panayiotou	Leicester City	16 November 2014	
2 February 2015	MF	WAL	Tommy O'Sullivan	Cardiff City	2 March 2015	
2 February 2015	FW	ENG	Greg Luer	Hull City	2 March 2015	
12 February 2015	DF	ENG	Ryan Inniss	Crystal Palace	14 March 2015	
12 March 2015	MF	WAL	Tommy O'Sullivan	Cardiff City	End of season	
26 March 2015	MF	Guinea-Bissau	Francisco Júnior	Everton	End of season	
26 March 2015	DF	SCO	Neill Collins	Sheffield United	End of season	
26 March 2015	MF	SEN	Mohamed Coulibaly	AFC Bournemouth	End of season	

=== Loans out ===
Start date	Position	Nationality	Name	To	End date	Ref.
12 June 2014	MF	WAL	Kaid Mohamed	Northampton Town	End of season	
13 August 2014	GK	ENG	Ryan Boot	Norton United	13 September 2014	
26 September 2014	GK	ENG	Ryan Boot	Newcastle Town	20 November 2014	
24 October 2014	DF	ENG	Nathan Smith	Stafford Rangers	End of season	
27 October 2014	MF	ENG	Steve Jennings	Tranmere Rovers	5 January 2015	
20 November 2014	GK	ENG	Sam Johnson	Alfreton Town	8 December 2014	
13 February 2015	GK	ENG	Ryan Boot	Worcester City	31 March 2015	
9 March 2015	MF	ENG	Chris Lines	Bristol Rovers	End of season	
