= Sam Johnson (footballer, born 1992) =

English footballer

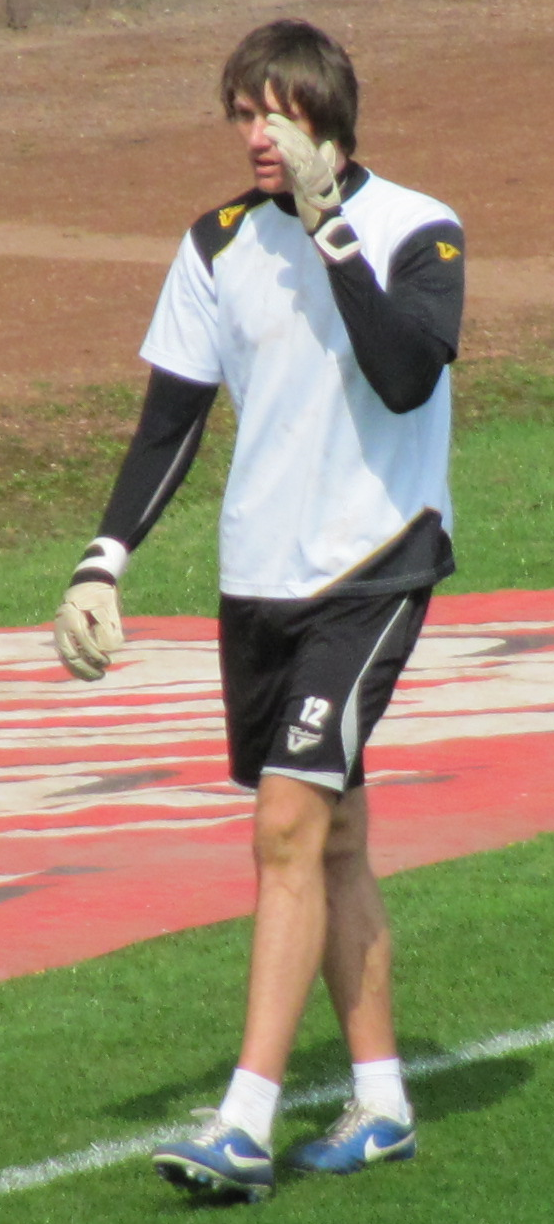
- Johnson warming up for Port Vale in 2013

Personal information
- Full name: Samuel William Johnson
- Date of birth: 1 December 1992 (age 33)
- Place of birth: Newcastle-under-Lyme, England
- Height: 6 ft 7 in (2.01 m)
- Position: Goalkeeper

Team information
- Current team: Solihull Moors (on loan from FC Halifax Town)

Youth career
- Stoke City
- 2007–2010: Port Vale

Senior career*
Years	Team	Apps	(Gls)
2010–2017	Port Vale	23	(0)
2011	→ Stafford Rangers (loan)	11	(0)
2014	→ Alfreton Town (loan)	4	(0)
2015–2016	→ FC Halifax Town (loan)	25	(0)
2016–2017	→ Gateshead (loan)	11	(0)
2017	→ FC Halifax Town (loan)	19	(0)
2017–	FC Halifax Town	388	(0)
2026–	→ Solihull Moors (loan)	0	(0)
- * Club domestic league appearances and goals as of 20:56, 26 April 2026 (UTC)

Samuel William Johnson (born 1 December 1992) is an English professional footballer who plays as a goalkeeper for National League club Solihull Moors, on loan from National League club Halifax Town.

Johnson turned professional at Port Vale in April 2011 and played on loan at non-League Stafford Rangers later in the year. He made his debut for the Vale in October 2012 and helped the club to secure promotion out of League Two in 2012–13. He was loaned out to Alfreton Town in November 2014, and FC Halifax Town in December 2015, and won the FA Trophy with Halifax in May 2016. He was loaned to Gateshead in June 2016. He returned to Halifax on loan in January 2017 and joined the club permanently four months later after he helped Halifax to win promotion out of the National League North via the play-offs. He was named as Halifax's Player of the Year for the 2018–19 season. He again won the FA Trophy in 2023 and became the club's record appearance holder. He was loaned to Solihull Moors in October 2026.

== Career ==
=== Port Vale ===
Born in Newcastle-under-Lyme, Staffordshire, Johnson started his career in the youth system at local club Stoke City before being released at age 14. He quickly joined the city's other local professional club – Port Vale, after youth-team coach Mark Grew spotted his potential. In the 2010–11 season, he was handed a squad number after the club's number 1, Chris Martin, picked up a stomach bug. Aged only 17, he still towered over the rest of the dressing room at six-foot six. Johnson was not fazed by the prospect of a first-team debut, Grew comparing him to Paul Musselwhite in his unflappable, rather laid-back personality. In April 2011, he was offered a one-year professional contract at the club.

He spent September 2011 on loan at nearby Northern Premier League Premier Division club Stafford Rangers. He made his debut in a 5–4 defeat by Hednesford Town at Keys Park on 29 August, though manager Greg Clowes refused to blame Johnson for the five goals conceded. The loan was then extended into October. He then went on to concede just nine goals in his next ten matches, and returned to Vale Park having played a total of 13 matches. He agreed a new one-year contract with the Vale in May 2012.

Chris Neal and Johnson were the club's only two professional goalkeepers in 2012–13. After Neal picked up a groin strain, manager Micky Adams had little recourse but to hand Johnson his debut on 9 October, in a Football League Trophy match with Walsall at the Bescot Stadium. Before the match, Adams said "We think an awful lot of him in terms of his development, but he's a first-year professional and he'll either sink or swim." Despite making "a string of important saves", he was unable to prevent the two Walsall goals in a 2–2 draw; however, in a remarkable turn of events he saved three penalties and then went on to score the winning penalty as the 22nd penalty taker of the penalty shoot-out.

"We were having a laugh before the game saying I was going to score the winning penalty, but I never dreamed it would happen. I've never actually taken one before, so to score one on my debut, and for it to be the winner, is just incredible. I've never, ever felt so nervous before I stepped up to take it. I just picked my corner and hoped their keeper would go the other way. Luckily he did."

— Johnson speaking after making "a debut that dreams are made of".

Vale secured promotion to League One at the end of 2012–13. Though Johnson did not feature in any league matches, he was named as the club's Young Player of the Season. He signed a new two-year contract with the club in May 2013.

Johnson made his debut in the Football League on 30 November 2013, again away to Walsall, and impressed after keeping a clean sheet in a 2–0 victory. After the match, Adams confirmed Johnson would keep goal in the absence of Chris Neal, who had injured his wrist in training. He played seven league matches before Neal recovered and was returned to the first-team. He returned to the first-team after Neal picked up another injury on 22 March.

Johnson started 2014–15 as the club's first-choice goalkeeper. Neal regained his first-team place after six matches. Johnson was loaned out to Alfreton Town of the Conference Premier in November 2014 to gain more first-team experience. He played four matches for Nicky Law's Alfreton before a shoulder injury cut his loan spell short. He signed a new one-year contract with the Vale in June 2015.

As Neal picked up an injury in pre-season, Johnson was due to start 2015–16 as first-choice goalkeeper. However, manager Rob Page signed Jak Alnwick days before the opening match of the season after Johnson had a shaky pre-season, leaving Johnson as the club's third-choice goalkeeper. He joined National League club FC Halifax Town on 27 November 2015 on a one-month loan. His loan was extended to the end of the season after he gained a first-team place. He played a total of 25 league matches for the club but could not prevent Halifax from being relegated at the end of 2015–16. He did, though play at Wembley Stadium in the 2016 FA Trophy final and kept a clean sheet as Halifax beat Grimsby Town 1–0.

In June 2016, it was announced that Johnson would spend 2016–17 on loan at National League club Gateshead. He played the first ten league matches of the season, before losing his first-team place to Dan Hanford. Having failed to win back a starting place, the loan was cancelled in January 2017.

=== FC Halifax Town ===
On 1 January 2017, Johnson returned to FC Halifax Town – now in the National League North – on loan until the end of 2016–17. He kept three clean sheets in a row in February. Halifax qualified for the play-offs after finishing in third place, and beat Chorley 2–1 in the play-off final to secure promotion at the first attempt. He was released by new Port Vale manager Michael Brown in May 2017 and signed a two-year contract with Halifax. He made 47 appearances across the 2017–18 campaign as the "Shaymen" posted a 16th-place finish under the stewardship of Jamie Fullarton. He played an "inspired" performance in keeping a clean sheet at Dover Athletic and made a "string of outstanding saves" at Maidstone United on the final day. He won the club website Player of the Year and runner-up for the Halifax Town Supporters Club award.

He remained an ever-present over the course of the 54 game 2018–19 season, keeping 19 clean sheets, and subsequently was named as Halifax's Player of the Year, as well as Players' Player of the Year. Showing modesty at this achievement, he stated that he thought Nathan Clarke would have won the award and thanked Clarke and Matty Brown for providing experience to the Halifax defence. He made 41 appearances in the 2019–20 season, which was permanently suspended on 26 March due to the COVID-19 pandemic in England, with Halifax in the play-offs in sixth-place. The play-offs took place four months later and Halifax were eliminated by Boreham Wood.

Johnson played 45 games in the 2020–21 season, as Halifax missed out on the play-offs after losing to Chesterfield on the final day. Speaking shortly after playing his 200th game for Halifax, Johnson said that he thought he had his weakest season for the club but had benefited from being tutored by goalkeeping coach Paul Oakes. He signed a new two-year contract in June 2021. He featured 51 times in the 2021–22 campaign, keeping 19 clean sheets to help Pete Wild's side to qualify for the play-offs with a fourth-place finish. However, they were beaten 2–1 by Chesterfield in the play-off quarter-finals. He was named in the National League Team of the Season.

He was an ever-present again in the 2022–23 campaign, keeping three clean sheets and being the victorious goalkeeper in three penalty shoot-out wins en route to the club's entirely away-from-home journey to the 2023 FA Trophy final. He kept a clean sheet in the final as Halifax defeated Gateshead 1–0 to win the FA Trophy for the second time. He was appointed as club captain in August 2023, which he described as a great honour. He made 49 appearances in the 2023–24 campaign and said "I'm probably having one of my best seasons". He added that "I'd love nothing more than to be the one to take us into the Football League" as his side entered the play-offs, only for them to lose to Solihull Moors at the eliminator stage.

He picked up a serious injury in March, which led the club to sign Toby Savin on loan as cover. Johnson recovered before the end of the 2024–25 season to lead Halifax into the play-offs.a Halifax were beaten by Oldham Athletic in the play-off eliminator. He signed a new two-year contract in June 2025. He said, "I do think there's another chapter to tell in my story here" after the "heartbreak and after everything we've been through" in recent seasons. He was an ever-present again in the 2025–26 season, keeping 11 clean sheets in what he maintained was a positive campaign.

He lost his first-team place for the 2026–27 campaign. On 23 October 2026, Johnson joined fellow National League side Solihull Moors on loan until 3 January 2027.

== Career statistics ==
As of match played 25 April 2026

Appearances and goals by club, season and competition
Club	Season	League			FA Cup		League Cup		Other		Total	
Club	Season	Division	Apps	Goals	Apps	Goals	Apps	Goals	Apps	Goals	Apps	Goals
Port Vale	2010–11	League Two	0	0	0	0	0	0	0	0	0	0
Port Vale	2011–12	League Two	0	0	0	0	0	0	0	0	0	0
Port Vale	2012–13	League Two	0	0	0	0	0	0	1 (Note: Appearance in Football League Trophy)	0	1	0
Port Vale	2013–14	League One	16	0	1	0	0	0	0	0	17	0
Port Vale	2014–15	League One	7	0	0	0	1	0	0	0	8	0
Port Vale	2015–16	League One	0	0	0	0	0	0	0	0	0	0
Port Vale	2016–17	League One	0	0	0	0	0	0	0	0	0	0
Port Vale	Total		23	0	1	0	1	0	1	0	26	0
Stafford Rangers (loan)	2011–12	Northern Premier League; Premier Division	11	0	—		—		2 (Note: Appearances in FA Trophy)	0	13	0
Alfreton Town (loan)	2014–15	Conference Premier	4	0	—		—		—		4	0
FC Halifax Town (loan)	2015–16	National League	25	0	—		—		8	0	33	0
Gateshead (loan)	2016–17	National League	11	0	0	0	—		0	0	11	0
FC Halifax Town (loan)	2016–17	National League North	19	0	—		—		3 (Note: Appearances in National League North play-offs)	0	22	0
FC Halifax Town	2017–18	National League	44	0	1	0	—		2	0	47	0
FC Halifax Town	2018–19	National League	46	0	5	0	—		3	0	54	0
FC Halifax Town	2019–20	National League	37	0	1	0	—		4 (Note: 3 appearances in the FA Trophy and 1 appearance in the play-offs.)	0	42	0
FC Halifax Town	2020–21	National League	42	0	1	0	—		2	0	45	0
FC Halifax Town	2021–22	National League	43	0	4	0	—		4	0	51	0
FC Halifax Town	2022–23	National League	46	0	2	0	—		6	0	54	0
FC Halifax Town	2023–24	National League	46	0	1	0	—		2 (Note: 1 appearance in the FA Trophy and 1 appearance in the play-offs.)	0	49	0
FC Halifax Town	2024–25	National League	38	0	1	0	—		2	0	41	0
FC Halifax Town	2025–26	National League	46	0	1	0	—		1 (Note: Appearance in National League Cup)	0	48	0
FC Halifax Town	2026–27	National League	0	0	0	0	—		0	0	0	0
FC Halifax Town	Total		407	0	17	0	—		29	0	453	0
Solihull Moors (loan)	2026–27	National League	0	0	—		—		0	0	0	0
Career total			481	0	18	0	1	0	40	0	540	0

== Honours ==
Port Vale

- Football League Two third-place promotion: 2012–13

FC Halifax Town

- National League North play-offs: 2017
- FA Trophy: 2015–16, 2022–23

Individual

- FC Halifax Town Player of the Year: 2018–19
- National League Team of the Season: 2021–22
