= Chris Neal =

English footballer (born 1985)

- Neal with Port Vale in 2013

Personal information
- Full name: Christopher Michael Neal
- Date of birth: 23 October 1985 (age 41)
- Place of birth: St Albans, England
- Height: 6 ft 2 in (1.88 m)
- Position: Goalkeeper

Senior career*
Years	Team	Apps	(Gls)
2004–2009	Preston North End	1	(0)
2005	→ Tamworth (loan)	5	(0)
2006	→ Shrewsbury Town (loan)	0	(0)
2007	→ Morecambe (loan)	0	(0)
2009–2012	Shrewsbury Town	64	(0)
2012–2016	Port Vale	123	(0)
2016	→ Doncaster Rovers (loan)	2	(0)
2016	→ Bury (loan)	10	(0)
2016–2018	Fleetwood Town	25	(0)
2018–2020	Salford City	61	(0)
2020–2025	AFC Fylde	91	(0)
Total		382	(0)

Managerial career
- 2024: AFC Fylde (joint-caretaker)
- 2025: AFC Fylde (joint-interim)
- * Club domestic league appearances and goals

Christopher Michael Neal (born 23 October 1985) is an English former professional footballer who played as a goalkeeper and is now goalkeeping coach at National League club AFC Fylde.

Neal began his career at Preston North End, making his English Football League debut in February 2005, having previously impressed in a brief loan spell at Conference club Tamworth. He had short loan spells at Shrewsbury Town and Morecambe in the 2006–07 season as a covering player before he was signed by Shrewsbury Town permanently in July 2009. He was the club's regular custodian as promotion to League One was achieved in 2011–12. He joined Port Vale in July 2012 and helped the club to secure promotion out of League Two in 2012–13. He joined Doncaster Rovers on loan in February 2016 and then Bury the following month. He joined Fleetwood Town on a free transfer in May 2016 before joining Salford City in May 2018. He dropped down to the National League North to sign with AFC Fylde in August 2020 and helped the club to the league title at the end of the 2022–23 season.

He began coaching at AFC Fylde in July 2024 and became joint-caretaker manager two months later, and again in February 2025.

== Career ==
=== Preston North End ===
Neal began his career at Preston North End, signing professional forms under Billy Davies at the start of the 2004–05 season. He went on loan to Conference National club Tamworth in January 2005. He made his debut for the "Lambs" on 8 January, in a 4–3 defeat to Aldershot Town at the Recreation Ground. He kept a clean sheet on his debut at The Lamb Ground 16 days later, as Tamworth recorded a 1–0 win over Accrington Stanley; during the game he was credited with making a "brilliant" save. He played a total of six games for Mark Cooper's team, before returning to Preston in February. He made his first and only appearance for the "Lilywhites" on 18 February, as Gavin Ward was forced to leave the field 83 minutes into a 1–1 draw with Ipswich Town in a Championship fixture at Deepdale. At the end of the season Chester City and Tamworth attempted to sign him on loan, but both clubs were unsuccessful. He was linked to a move to Oldham Athletic in July 2006, but again no move materialized.

Neal had to wait until September 2006 for another loan move, as he spent one month at Gary Peters' League Two club Shrewsbury Town, providing cover for Chris Mackenzie after an injury to Ryan Esson. Neal appeared on the Shrewsbury bench for six league matches but did not make it onto the pitch at Gay Meadow. However, he did play the full 90 minutes of the Football League Trophy match at Hereford United. At the end of the season he was signed by Morecambe as an emergency loan after the club's regular custodian Steven Drench dislocated an elbow, leaving manager Sammy McIlroy to choose between Davies and Neal for the 2007 Conference National play-off final at Wembley. Despite being awarded a winners medal he did not spend any time on the pitch for the Lancashire club as the club's rookie goalkeeper, Scott Davies, proved up to the task of keeping goal in the club's successful promotion bid. Neal did not make a senior appearance in 2007–08 or 2008–09 under either Paul Simpson or Alan Irvine. During this time he shook off a bout of conjunctivitis.

=== Shrewsbury Town ===
In July 2009, Neal moved permanently from Preston, rejoining Paul Simpson's Shrewsbury Town for a nominal fee. He started the first four games of the 2009–10 season, but lost his place to loanee David Button due to a groin injury, and played just six further games that season. He began the 2010–11 campaign as the "Shrews" preferred keeper following an injury to rival Ben Smith, but lost his first-team place in November after 20 appearances, and only played a handful of games thereafter as a fit again Smith was preferred by manager Graham Turner. He made his first League Two appearance of the 2011–12 season on 8 October, but remained between the sticks for the rest of the season, as Shrewsbury won promotion as the division's runners-up.

=== Port Vale ===
He failed to agree fresh terms with Shrewsbury, having only been offered a one-year deal, and instead signed a two-year contract with Port Vale in July 2012, having impressed manager Micky Adams in a match between the two clubs some months earlier. He admitted that he had expected to stay at the New Meadow, but that he was happy to switch clubs in an attempt to win promotion out of League Two for a second-successive season with the "Valiants". He began the 2012–13 season in excellent form, and was named as man of the match after saving eleven shots in a 1–0 win over Bradford City at Valley Parade on 29 September. However, three days later he dropped a "clanger" at Vale Park as a weak 25 yards (23 m) shot from Dagenham & Redbridge midfielder Luke Howell "somehow squirmed beneath the embarrassed keeper and trickled into the Vale net" in a disappointing 1–1 draw. He began wearing protective face gear after bruising his cheekbone against Dagenham, and then continued to wear the gear as he superstitiously believed they were essential to the team's run of good results (however he stopped this practice after a run of defeats in December). He made "a string of flying stops during a man-of-the-match display" in an FA Cup defeat to Sheffield United at Bramall Lane on 1 December. He remained a near ever-present, playing 51 games as Vale were promoted at the end of the season in third place, and was voted as both the Port Vale's players' Player of the Season and away fan's Player of the Season.

Neal made a strong start to the 2013–14 season before injuring his wrist at the end of November. After returning to fitness he displaced deputy goalkeeper Sam Johnson and retained his first-team spot until he damaged his ankle ligaments in a challenge with Tranmere Rovers defender Ian Goodison on 22 March; the resulting injury kept him out of action for the rest of the season. Despite his injuries he was again voted as both the Port Vale's players' Player of the Season and away fan's Player of the Season, and signed a new two-year contract in the summer.

Neal started the 2014–15 season on the bench, as Johnson was selected for the season opener. After returning to the starting line-up in September he won praise for his performances. He again earned praise in December for a series of consistent performances and impressive saves in close games. He remain the first choice goalkeeper until he was suspending after being sent off in a 3–1 defeat at Leyton Orient. He returned to the first-team following his suspension. He was one of the most consistent performers of the season.

He missed the start of the 2015–16 season after picking up an ankle injury in pre-season and only returned to match fitness at the end of October. He joined league rivals Doncaster Rovers on a 28-day loan on 1 February as manager Darren Ferguson looked to provide competition for Thorsten Stuckmann and Marko Maroši. Neal stated that he joined "Donny" to play first-team football. He played two games at Keepmoat Stadium before Port Vale ended his loan spell on 20 February as injury to Jak Alnwick restored Neal to the Vale first-team. He retained his first-team place at Vale until 18 March, when he joined Bury on loan until the end of the season. Port Vale released him upon the expiry of his contract at the end of the season. In December 2019, local newspaper The Sentinel ran a poll of fans to debate Port Vale's best goalkeeper of the 2010s; Neal finished in second place with 30% of the vote, behind Scott Brown (44%) and ahead of Jak Alnwick (26%).

=== Fleetwood Town ===
Neal signed a two-year contract with League One club Fleetwood Town in May 2016, and joined the club shortly after the departure of Chris Maxwell. He was named in the EFL Team of the Week after keeping a second-successive clean sheet in a 2–0 win over Coventry City on 3 September. However, he lost his first-team place to Alex Cairns in November; manager Uwe Rösler admitted that the situation was a "little bit harsh on Chris Neal because Chris Neal did nothing wrong" and it was Cairns's strong form that made him undroppable. On 6 January 2018, he kept a clean sheet in a 0–0 draw with Leicester City in the third round of the FA Cup, and was rewarded with a year's supply of pizza from sponsors Papa John's Pizza. He was released by manager John Sheridan upon the expiry of his contract at Highbury Stadium at the end of the 2017–18 season.

=== Salford City ===
On 17 May 2018, Neal signed a two-year contract with newly promoted National League club Salford City. He was a former teammate of "Ammies" manager Graham Alexander as Preston. He made his debut in the opening match of the 2018–19 season as Salford recorded a 1–1 draw with Leyton Orient at Moor Lane on 4 August. He made a total of 51 appearances throughout the campaign as Salford qualified for the play-off semi-finals with a third-place finish, and he saved two penalties in the shoot-out following a 1–1 draw with Eastleigh to secure a place in the final. A 3–0 victory over AFC Fylde in the final won Salford a place in the English Football League for the first time. He shared the first-team goalkeeping spot with new signing Kyle Letheren during the 2019–20 season, though both players were released at the end of the campaign.

=== AFC Fylde ===
On 15 August 2020, Neal signed with National League North club AFC Fylde; he said that after speaking with manager Jim Bentley that "what happened last year with relegation we are hoping was just a blip, for some reason it was a bit of an off-season but hopefully we can rectify that this season". He made 17 appearances before the 2020–21 season was curtailed due to the COVID-19 pandemic in England. Fylde exercised an option to extend his contract beyond the summer. He played 29 games in the 2021–22 season, missing November through February due to family reasons. Manager James Rowe described him as an "outstanding individual". Fylde were beaten 2–0 by Boston United in the play-off semi-finals at Mill Farm. Neal signed a new one-year contract in May 2022. He was an ever-present throughout the 2022–23 campaign as manager Adam Murray led Fylde to promotion as champions of the National League North. He then became the back-up goalkeeper to new signing Theo Richardson and departed the club at the end of the 2023–24 season.

== Coaching career ==
Neal returned to his former club AFC Fylde as a goalkeeping coach in July 2024. Following the sacking of Chris Beech in September 2024, Neal was appointed joint-caretaker manager, alongside Nathan Delfouneso. Kevin Phillips was appointed as the club's new manager on 8 October. On 25 February 2025, following Phillips' departure, Neal was appointed joint-interim manager, alongside David Longwell, until the end of the 2024–25 season. Fylde were relegated on 18 April, and a permanent manager in Craig Mahon was named on 22 June. He advised Mahon to keep young goalkeeper Pat Boyes at the club.

== Personal life ==
Neal's partner, Emma, gave birth to a baby boy, Zachary Christopher Neal, on 5 December 2021 at Arrowe Park Hospital; Zach was born prematurely and placed in intensive care and died on 15 April 2022. Neal raised money for the hospital later in the year.

== Career statistics ==
=== Playing statistics ===
As of match played 28 January 2025

Appearances and goals by club, season and competition
Club	Season	League			FA Cup		League Cup		Other		Total	
Club	Season	Division	Apps	Goals	Apps	Goals	Apps	Goals	Apps	Goals	Apps	Goals
Preston North End	2004–05	Championship	1	0	0	0	0	0	—		1	0
Preston North End	2005–06	Championship	0	0	0	0	0	0	—		0	0
Preston North End	2006–07	Championship	0	0	0	0	0	0	—		0	0
Preston North End	2007–08	Championship	0	0	0	0	0	0	—		0	0
Preston North End	2008–09	Championship	0	0	0	0	0	0	0	0	0	0
Preston North End	Total		1	0	0	0	0	0	0	0	1	0
Tamworth (loan)	2004–05	Conference National	5	0	0	0	—		1 (Note: Appearances in the FA Trophy)	0	6	0
Shrewsbury Town (loan)	2006–07	League Two	0	0	0	0	0	0	1 (Note: Appearances in the Football League Trophy)	0	1	0
Morecambe (loan)	2006–07	Conference National	—		—		—		0	0	0	0
Shrewsbury Town	2009–10	League Two	7	0	1	0	1	0	1	0	10	0
Shrewsbury Town	2010–11	League Two	22	0	1	0	1	0	1	0	25	0
Shrewsbury Town	2011–12	League Two	35	0	3	0	0	0	1	0	39	0
Shrewsbury Town	Total		64	0	5	0	2	0	3	0	74	0
Port Vale	2012–13	League Two	46	0	2	0	1	0	2	0	51	0
Port Vale	2013–14	League One	31	0	4	0	1	0	2	0	38	0
Port Vale	2014–15	League One	40	0	1	0	1	0	1	0	43	0
Port Vale	2015–16	League One	6	0	0	0	0	0	0	0	6	0
Port Vale	Total		123	0	7	0	3	0	5	0	138	0
Doncaster Rovers (loan)	2015–16	League One	2	0	—		—		—		2	0
Bury (loan)	2015–16	League One	10	0	—		—		—		10	0
Fleetwood Town	2016–17	League One	17	0	1	0	1	0	2 (Note: Appearances in the EFL Trophy)	0	21	0
Fleetwood Town	2017–18	League One	8	0	3	0	0	0	4	0	15	0
Fleetwood Town	Total		25	0	4	0	1	0	6	0	36	0
Salford City	2018–19	National League	46	0	3	0	—		2 (Note: Appearances in the National League play-offs)	0	51	0
Salford City	2019–20	League Two	15	0	2	0	1	0	3	0	21	0
Salford City	Total		61	0	5	0	1	0	5	0	72	0
AFC Fylde	2020–21	National League North	15	0	2	0	—		0	0	17	0
AFC Fylde	2021–22	National League North	29	0	0	0	—		0	0	29	0
AFC Fylde	2022–23	National League North	46	0	4	0	—		2	0	52	0
AFC Fylde	2023–24	National League	1	0	0	0	—		2	0	3	0
AFC Fylde	2024–25	National League	0	0	0	0	—		0	0	0	0
AFC Fylde	Total		91	0	4	0	0	0	4	0	101	0
Career total			382	0	25	0	7	0	25	0	439	0

=== Managerial statistics ===
As of match played 22 June 2025

Managerial record by team and tenure
Team	From	To	Record					Ref.
Team	From	To	P	W	D	L	Win %	Ref.
AFC Fylde (caretaker)	15 September 2024	8 October 2024	5	2	1	2	40.0	
AFC Fylde (interim)	25 February 2025	22 June 2025	14	2	2	10	14.3	
Total			19	4	3	12	21.1	

== Honours ==
Morecambe

- Conference National play-offs: 2007

Shrewsbury Town

- Football League Two second-place promotion: 2011–12

Port Vale

- Football League Two third-place promotion: 2012–13

Salford City

- National League play-offs: 2019

AFC Fylde

- National League North: 2022–23
