= Ben Williamson (English footballer) =

English footballer (born 1988)

Personal information
- Full name: Benjamin Marc Williamson
- Date of birth: 25 December 1988 (age 37)
- Place of birth: Lambeth, London, England
- Height: 1.80 m (5 ft 11 in)
- Position: Forward

Youth career
- Millwall
- Croydon Athletic

Senior career*
Years	Team	Apps	(Gls)
2009–2010	Worthing	?	(14)
2010–2011	Jerez Industrial	12	(8)
2011	Bournemouth	4	(0)
2011–2012	Hyde	0	(0)
2011–2012	→ Port Vale (loan)	35	(3)
2012–2015	Port Vale	114	(18)
2015–2016	Gillingham	9	(0)
2015–2016	→ Cambridge United (loan)	8	(3)
2016–2017	Cambridge United	53	(9)
2017–2019	Eastleigh	92	(18)
2019–2021	Bromley	52	(5)
2021–2022	Dover Athletic	23	(2)
2022–2023	Concord Rangers	49	(3)
2023–2024	Bowers & Pitsea	36	(14)
Total		488	(83)
- * Club domestic league appearances and goals

Benjamin Marc Williamson (born 25 December 1988) is an English former professional footballer who played as a striker

Williamson played for Worthing in 2009 before joining the Glenn Hoddle Academy in Spain the following year, where he had a spell with the academy's partner club, Jerez Industrial. In 2011, he returned to England to join Bournemouth, where he featured in the south-coast club's play-off semi-final against Huddersfield Town. He joined Port Vale on a season-long loan from Hyde in June 2011, which was made permanent the following year. He helped the club to secure promotion out of League Two in 2012–13. He moved to Gillingham in June 2015 and signed with Cambridge United in January 2016 following a brief loan spell. He joined Eastleigh in August 2017. After over two years with Eastleigh, he switched to Bromley in November 2019. He spent the first half of the 2021–22 season with Dover Athletic before signing with Concord Rangers in January 2022. He was promoted out of the Isthmian League North Division via the play-offs with Bowers & Pitsea in 2024.

== Career ==
=== Early career ===
Born in London, Williamson played youth football for Millwall and Croydon Athletic, before signing for Worthing of the Isthmian League Division One South in August 2009. In November 2009, Williamson attended a four-week trial at the Glenn Hoddle Academy. He was invited to the academy partly by chance, as Academy scouts had been watching Worthing teammate Ross Treleaven when Williamson scored a hat-trick and unwittingly alerted them to his potential.

=== The Glenn Hoddle Academy ===
He signed a two-year contract with the academy in the summer of 2010, and was selected to play for nearby Spanish side Jerez Industrial following the academy's takeover of the club. During the first half of the 2010–11 season, he played twelve games for the club, scoring eight goals. After he left the club, Jerez struggled, and suffered relegation at the end of the season. At the academy, Glenn Hoddle focused on improving Williamson's technique, especially in his left foot.

=== Bournemouth ===
On 31 January 2011, he joined League One club Bournemouth on a deal lasting until the end of the season. He made his debut on 5 February, appearing as an injury time substitute in a 1–1 draw with Leyton Orient. An ankle injury restricted him to just four further substitute appearances, including a brief appearance in the club's play-off semi-final draw with Huddersfield Town, coming on in the last minute replacing Danny Ings.

=== Hyde to Port Vale ===
In June 2011, he turned down a new deal at Bournemouth as manager Lee Bradbury could not guarantee regular first-team football. He joined Conference North club Hyde, but was loaned out to Micky Adams' Port Vale in League Two on a season-long loan.

"Burslem is a bit different to Bournemouth, never mind south-west Spain ... I still haven't found the beach. I had only been north of Birmingham once before, going to Manchester when I was about seven. But I'm 22, hungry for regular football, pleased to be here and ready to prove myself... The physical side doesn't faze me. I'm pretty quick, try to get in behind the defence and like to run at people with the ball... If I could take my ratio with Jerez into this year I'd end up with 30-odd goals – now that would do."

— Williamson on signing for Port Vale.

He got off the mark with his first Football League goals on 17 September, as he 'displayed athleticism, composure, bravery and a poacher's instinct' to score with a lob and then a header in a 3–2 home defeat to Shrewsbury Town. He made six starts and eight substitute appearances in the club's first 15 games of the season. However, he damaged his knee in a reserve team game at Derby County on 31 October, and was sidelined for several weeks. Vale failed to score a single goal in the five matches that he missed. However, he had to wait until boxing day before he made his return to first-team action. A stoppage-time strike against Oxford United seconds before the end of the 2011–12 season gave Williamson a tally of three goals in 35 league games (12 starts and 23 substitute appearances). He signed a new one-year contract with the club in May 2012.

He began the 2012–13 season, making regular appearances from the bench. His tendency to score important goals led to him being labelled as a "super-sub". He was favoured ahead of Louis Dodds for the first time against Northampton Town on 27 October, but was taken off for tactical reasons early into the match after defender John McCombe was sent off. He then returned to bench duty, and sealed his super-sub status with the winning goal against Forest Green Rovers in the first round of the FA Cup. He then scored two goals in two starts at the end of November. However, the arrival of Lee Hughes in the January transfer window meant that competition to partner the league's top-goalscorer in Tom Pope was fierce, and Williamson was mainly used as an impact player. He ended the campaign on nine goals in his 39 appearances, as Vale secured promotion with a third-place finish, and agreed to sign a new two-year contract in the summer.

Williamson scored six goals in 46 appearances in the 2013–14 campaign, helping the club to a ninth-place finish in League One. On 12 August 2014, Williamson scored his first career hat-trick during Port Vale's 6–2 League Cup victory over Hartlepool United. New manager Rob Page went on to say that Williamson was an important player in Page's tactics, his pace being useful to "create gaps for clever players like Dany N'Guessan, Mark Marshall and Louis Dodds". Page played him as the lone striker in a 4–5–1 formation. He ended the 2014–15 season with nine goals in 47 games.

=== Gillingham ===
Williamson rejected the offer of a new contract at Port Vale and instead signed a two-year contract with League One rivals Gillingham in June 2015. Manager Justin Edinburgh said the powerful striker would add a different dimension to the team's attack force. However, he made only four league starts for the club as manager Justin Edinburgh preferred to play Luke Norris, Rory Donnelly and Dominic Samuel.

=== Cambridge United ===
On 19 November 2015, Williamson joined Cambridge United on a six-week loan deal. He scored three goals in his first four appearances for Shaun Derry's "U's". Though he failed to find the net in the remaining four games of his loan spell, he still did enough to win a permanent transfer to Cambridge in January for an undisclosed fee. He was named on the Football League team of the week after scoring two goals and claiming an assist in a 3–1 victory at Leyton Orient, ably filling the gap left by a long-term injury to top-scorer Barry Corr. He again won a place on the team of the week after ending Yeovil Town run of five clean sheets with a brace during a 3–0 win at the Abbey Stadium on 19 March.

Speaking in February 2017, manager Shaun Derry said that Williamson had to "grasp that opportunity" after starting just four of the club's last 20 fixtures. Derry went on to say that Williamson had "enthusiasm for training... [and] his work rate... [won him] the respect of the whole football club" but that ultimately "you only get judged on the goals you score and the facts of the matter are Ben hasn't scored enough goals this year". He scored just one goal in 43 appearances throughout the 2016–17 campaign and was released in May 2017.

=== Eastleigh ===
On 2 August 2017, Williamson signed with National League club Eastleigh. Manager Richard Hill said that "I'm delighted to secure the services of Ben, especially with a list of National League teams after him". He scored ten goals in 37 appearances for the "Spitfires" across the 2017–18 campaign and was retained by new manager Andy Hessenthaler. He scored seven goals in 40 appearances throughout the 2018–19 season, helping Eastleigh to reach the play-off semi-finals, where they were beaten by Salford City on penalties. He was offered a new contract in the summer by manager Ben Strevens.

=== Bromley ===
On 22 November 2019, Williamson was signed by Eastleigh's National League rivals Bromley. He scored 14 minutes into his "Ravens" debut the following day, in a 2–0 win over Sutton United. He scored two goals in 18 appearances in the 2019–20 season, which was permanently suspended on 26 March due to the COVID-19 pandemic in England, with Bromley in 13th-place. He scored three goals in 35 league games during the 2020–21 campaign, including the goal that secured a 1–0 win over Notts County and play-off place on the last day of the season. Bromley lost 3–2 at Hartlepool United in the play-off quarter-finals and Williamson was substituted at half-time.

=== Dover Athletic ===
On 24 June 2021, Williamson joined National League side Dover Athletic in a move that reunited him with former Eastleigh boss Andy Hessenthaler. A first goal for the club came from the penalty spot with the first of two equalisers in a 5–2 defeat to Stockport County. He scored two goals in 25 games in the first half of the 2021–22 season before he left the club by mutual consent on 26 January.

=== Concord Rangers ===
On 29 January 2022, Williamson signed for National League South side Concord Rangers. On 12 February, he was named in the Non-League Paper's team of the week after he scored in a 3–1 home win over Havant & Waterlooville. However, this was his only goal in 17 appearances for the "Beach Boys" in the second half of the 2021–22 season. He scored two goals in 28 starts and four substitute appearances during the 2022–23 season as Concord were relegated to 22nd place.

=== Bowers & Pitsea ===
Williamson scored 14 goals in 42 games for Bowers & Pitsea in the 2023–24 season, helping the club to secure promotion via the play-offs.

== Style of play ==
Neil Duncanson, commercial director at the Glenn Hoddle Academy said "Ben is a good striker, with a good eye for goal He has fantastic movement off the ball and the pace to take on any defender". After his arrival at Port Vale, manager Micky Adams stated "Ben is a quick striker". Strike partner Tom Pope further said that "he's strong, quick, has a lot of attributes... [and is] going to have a good career". Veteran striker Lee Hughes stated that "he has terrific pace, he's really powerful, his movement is great and he has awareness too".

== Personal life ==
Williamson studied Mathematics & Business studies at the University of Brighton. He is a lifelong Arsenal supporter.

== Career statistics ==
Appearances and goals by club, season and competition
Club	Season	League			FA Cup		League Cup		Other		Total	
Club	Season	Division	Apps	Goals	Apps	Goals	Apps	Goals	Apps	Goals	Apps	Goals
Jerez Industrial	2010–11	Tercera División Group X	12	8	0	0	—		0	0	12	8
Bournemouth	2010–11	League One	4	0	0	0	0	0	1 (Note: Appearance in the League One play-offs)	0	5	0
Hyde	2011–12	Conference North	0	0	0	0	—		0	0	0	0
Port Vale (loan)	2011–12	League Two	35	3	0	0	1	0	1 (Note: Appearances in the Football League Trophy)	0	37	3
Port Vale	2012–13	League Two	33	8	2	1	1	0	3	0	39	9
Port Vale	2013–14	League One	38	4	5	2	1	0	2	0	46	6
Port Vale	2014–15	League One	43	6	1	0	2	3	1	0	47	9
Port Vale	Total		149	21	8	3	5	3	7	0	169	27
Gillingham	2015–16	League One	9	0	1	0	2	0	2	0	14	0
Cambridge United	2015–16	League Two	28	12	—		—		0	0	28	12
Cambridge United	2016–17	League Two	33	0	4	1	2	0	4 (Note: Appearances in the EFL Trophy)	0	43	1
Cambridge United	Total		61	12	4	1	2	0	4	0	71	13
Eastleigh	2017–18	National League	36	10	1	0	—		0	0	37	10
Eastleigh	2018–19	National League	36	7	1	0	—		3 (Note: 1 appearance in the FA Trophy and 2 appearances in the play-offs)	0	40	7
Eastleigh	2019–20	National League	20	1	4	1	—		0	0	24	2
Eastleigh	Total		92	18	6	1	0	0	3	0	101	19
Bromley	2019–20	National League	17	2	0	0	—		1 (Note: Appearances in the FA Trophy)	0	18	2
Bromley	2020–21	National League	35	3	2	0	—		3 (Note: 2 appearances in the FA Trophy and 1 appearance in the play-offs)	0	40	3
Bromley	Total		52	5	2	0	0	0	4	0	58	5
Dover Athletic	2021–22	National League	23	2	2	0	—		0	0	25	2
Concord Rangers	2021–22	National League South	17	1	0	0	—		0	0	17	1
Concord Rangers	2022–23	National League South	32	2	0	0	—		0	0	32	2
Concord Rangers	Total		49	3	0	0	0	0	0	0	49	3
Bowers & Pitsea	2023–24	Isthmian League; North Division	36	14	2	0	—		4 (Note: 1 appearance in the FA Trophy, 1 appearance in the Alan Turvey Trophy and 2 appearances in the play-offs)	0	42	14
Career total (Note: Worthing appearances unavailable.)			487	83	25	5	9	3	25	0	546	91

== Honours ==
Port Vale

- Football League Two third-place promotion: 2012–13

Bowers & Pitsea

- Isthmian League North Division play-offs: 2023–24
