= Glenn Hoddle Academy =

The Glenn Hoddle Academy
- Bisham Abbey, Buckinghamshire; United Kingdom

Information
- Type: Football Academy
- Established: 2008
- Founder: Glenn Hoddle
- Specialist: Football
- Gender: Male
- Age: 18+
- Colour: Yellow

The Glenn Hoddle Academy (GHA) was established in 2008, by former England international footballer Glenn Hoddle. Hoddle set the academy up in the memory of his brother, Carl, a former Tottenham Hotspur player who died aged 40.

The academy coaching staff was made up of Glenn Hoddle and fellow former footballers Graham Rix, Nigel Spackman, Dave Beasant and John Gorman.

According to Companies House, the Glenn Hoddle Academy was dissolved on 20 May 2014.

== Objectives ==
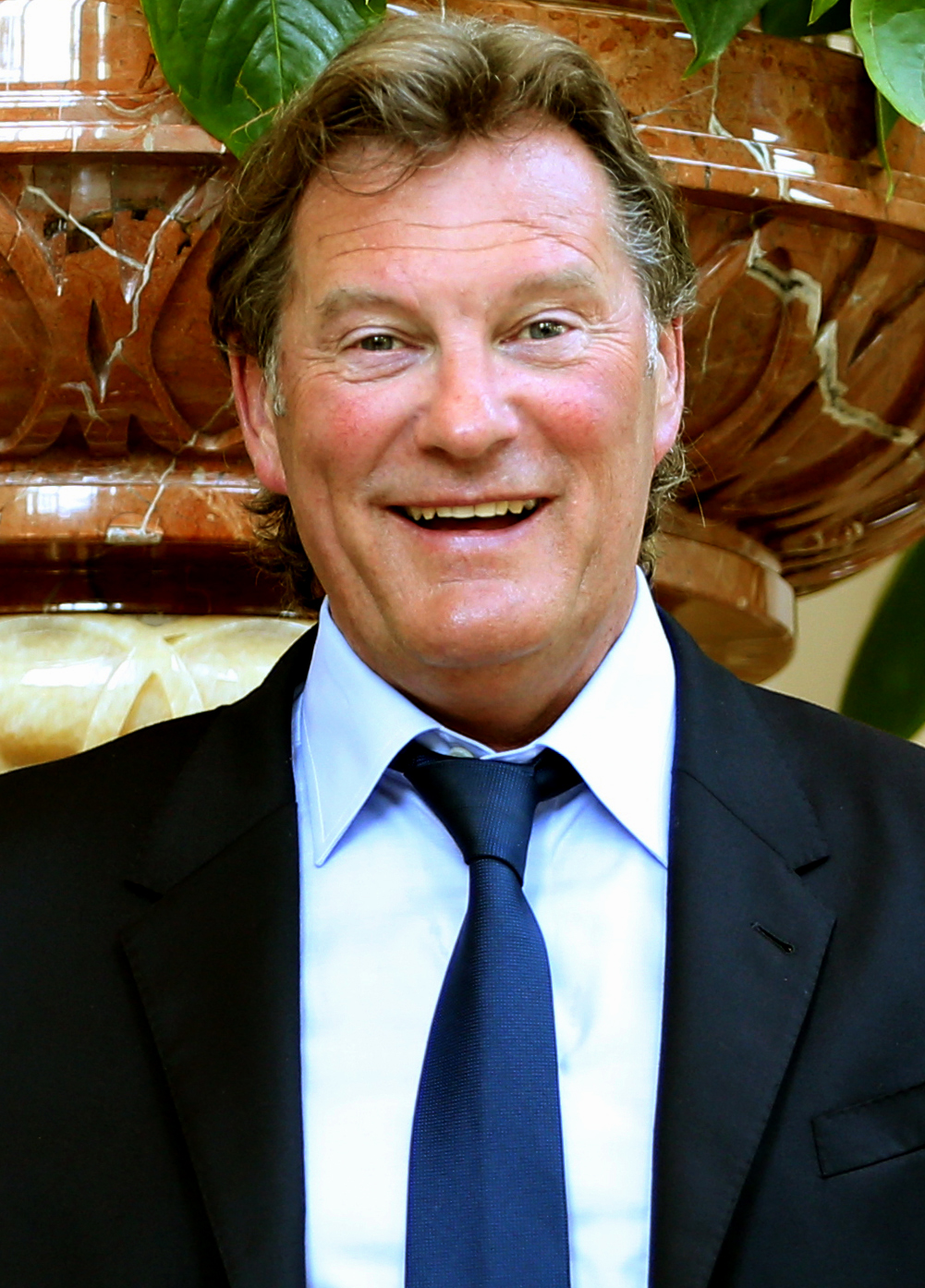
Glenn Hoddle pictured in 2014

The main objective of the academy was to get former Premier League and Football League Championship footballers back into professional football after being released by their various clubs.

Glenn Hoddle came up with the idea of a football academy a long time before it actually opened. He had the idea for his academy while managing in the early 1990s.

The academy was initially financed by Hero Global Football Fund but its eventual aim was to make a profit by selling players through third-party ownership, sell-on clauses, signing sponsorship deals and offering coaching for other organisations, to become self-sustainable.

In January 2009, the first signs that Hoddle's commitment was paying off came when former Fulham youngster Lino Goncalves was invited on a two-week trial with Championship club Ipswich Town. Chris Fagan was signed by Lincoln City, but only to be released again. James Dayton signed a 3-year contract with Kilmarnock. Another of the Academy's players, Ikechi Anya, signed a deal in February 2009 till the end of the season with Northampton Town, scoring 3 goals in 14 appearances. He went on to play internationally for Scotland.

== Impact ==
The Glenn Hoddle Academy played friendly matches against many teams, including a Real Madrid XI team and Chelsea reserves. In 2008, up to 40 selected players were invited to join the academy after being released by professional clubs or having been identified by scouts.

The academy's ultimate goal was stated as being getting players playing regularly at a La Liga team or a Premier League team. The first player from the academy to achieve this was Sam Clucas, a regular in the Championship with Hull City in 2015/16 during their promotion year and who started in the first team in the Premier League during the 2016/17 season.

== Jerez Industrial ==
Many of the academy players were on the books of Spanish fourth division side Jerez Industrial CF during the 2009–10 and 2010–11 season.

In summer 2010, the academy saved Jerez from bankruptcy by signing a five-year deal to manage the football side of the operation. Eight players joined on loan for the second half of the 2009/10 season, six English players and two Irish players. In their final pre-season friendly against Xerez B, eight of the starting 11 were English or Irish. Jerez won the match 2–0.

With the players owed wages and the club fighting for its survival before Hoddle assumed control of the football side of operations, a loan of around £160,000 was made so that the club could pay off debts and continue trading.

Hoddle did not hold a position at the club nor did he sit on the bench during games, acting as a director of football while his coaches, Graham Rix, Nigel Spackman and Dave Beasant, rotated match day duties two games at a time, working alongside Enrique Caballero.

In March 2011, the academy terminated the agreement with Jerez Industrial due to the club's failure to repay the loans it owed to the academy.

== Players ==
- Ikechi Anya – signed by Celta Vigo B, now retired and former Scotland international.
- Reis Ashraf – signed by Leamington; plays for Pakistan national football team.
- Harrison Bayley – signed by Onisolos.
- Ryan Burge – signed by Port Vale, now retired.
- David Cowley – signed by Recreativo de Huelva, before joining Harlow Town in August 2010.
- Sam Clucas - signed for Hereford United and (via Mansfield Town and Chesterfield) is now a free agent.
- James Dayton – signed by Kilmarnock in August 2010, now at Enfield Town.
- Chris Fagan – signed by Lincoln City before signing for Bohemian F.C. in February 2011.
- Alex Fisher - signed by Mansfield Town and now playing for Yeovil Town.
- James Folkes – signed by Eastleigh in 2010 but has since been released. Currently with Ebbsleet United as at Aug 2012.
- Lino Goncalves – signed by Recreativo de Huelva.
- Jordan Hugill – signed by Port Vale, now at Rotherham United.
- Billy Lumley – signed by Eastleigh in 2010.
- Loren Maxwell – signed by Forest Green Rovers.
- Adriano Moke – signed by York City in June 2011 .
- Luke Morgan - U19’s Academy coach Accrington Stanley
- Andy Owens – signed by Altrincham, now at AFC Telford United.
- Chris Riley – signed by Cheshunt via Ebbsfleet United and Stansted.
- Callum Morris – signed by Hayes, now at Ross County F.C.
- Michael Scott - signed by Livingston in 2011-12 season
- Daniel Spence – signed by Mansfield Town until the end of the 2010–11 season.
- Emmanuel Udoji – signed by Ebbsfleet United via Stafford Rangers and Aveley.
- Curtley Williams – signed by Lowestoft Town, now at Felixstowe & Walton United.
- Ben Williamson – signed by Port Vale, now at Concord Rangers F.C.
- Mickey Demetriou – signed by Eastbourne, now at Crewe Alexandra
