= Ryan Burge (footballer) =

English footballer (born 1988)

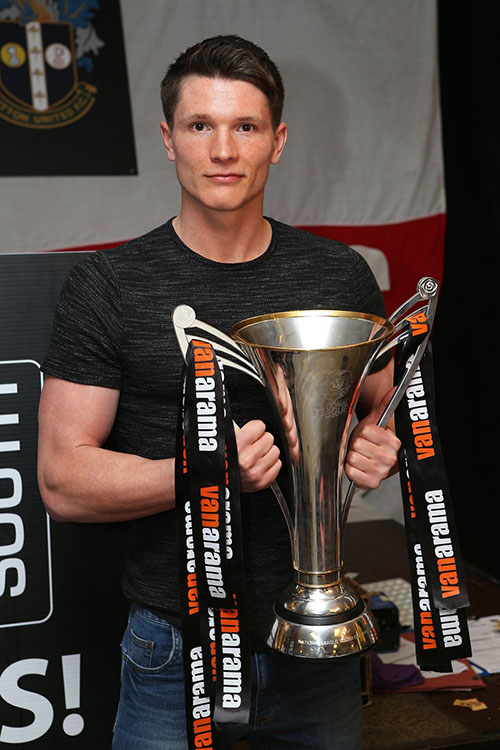
- Burge with the National League South title trophy

Personal information
- Full name: Ryan James Burge
- Date of birth: 12 October 1988 (age 38)
- Place of birth: Cheltenham, England
- Height: 5 ft 10 in (1.78 m)
- Position: Midfielder

Youth career
- Cadbury Athletic
- Birmingham City

Senior career*
Years	Team	Apps	(Gls)
2005–2008	Birmingham City	0	(0)
2008–2009	Barnet	1	(0)
2009	Machida Zelvia		
2010	Worcester City	1	(0)
2010–2011	Jerez Industrial	13	(2)
2011	Doncaster Rovers	1	(0)
2011	→ Oxford United (loan)	5	(0)
2011	Hyde	0	(0)
2011–2013	Port Vale	30	(2)
2013–2014	Newport County	17	(2)
2016	Sutton United	17	(3)
2017	Eastleigh	5	(0)
Total		90	(9)
- * Club domestic league appearances and goals

Ryan James Burge (born 12 October 1988) is an English former footballer who played as a midfielder in the English Football League and National League.

He started his professional career under contract at Birmingham City, Barnet and Japanese side Machida Zelvia. He joined the Glenn Hoddle Academy in Spain in the summer of 2009. From there, he was sent out to Worcester City, Jerez Industrial, Doncaster Rovers, and Oxford United to gain first-team experience. In June 2011, he signed with Port Vale via Hyde (partners of the Hoddle Academy). He was sacked by Port Vale in April 2013 and signed with Newport County for the 2013–14 season. After over 18 months out of the game, he signed with Sutton United in February 2016, helping the club to win promotion as champions of National League South at the end of the 2015–16 season, he left the club in December 2016 and joined Eastleigh for a brief spell four months later.

== Career ==
=== Early career ===
Born in Cheltenham, Gloucestershire, Burge spent a year at West Bromwich Albion, before playing alongside Daniel Sturridge at Cadbury Athletic. He also had a spell with Coventry City.

=== Birmingham City ===
After being tracked by both Manchester United and Manchester City, he began his professional career at Birmingham City, where he signed a three-year contract at the age of 17. Following the departure of manager Steve Bruce, Burge was released by Birmingham in March 2008. He went on trial at League Two club Hereford United and League One side Cheltenham Town. He was verbally offered a short-term contract by Cheltenham manager Keith Downing, but the deal collapsed after Downing was replaced as the Cheltenham manager by Martin Allen. He instead joined up with League Two side Barnet. He debuted for Barnet in the 4–0 home defeat by Notts County on 15 November 2008. This was the only appearance he made before his time there was disrupted by appendicitis, which ruled him out for four weeks. The club released him in January 2009.

=== Searching for a new club ===
In February 2009, Burge travelled to Japan, the birth place of his step-mother, in the hope of securing a contract with a J-League club. He spent a week trialling with Division Two side Avispa Fukuoka, followed by a trial period at Division One club Oita Trinita. Top-flight sides F.C. Tokyo and Sagan Tosu also expressed an interest in Burge, as he was tested at Kokushikan University against players such as Hidetoshi Nakata. He later joined third-tier side Machida Zelvia, where he made a handful of appearances. Burge said that the clubs in Japan appreciate inexperienced but technical players and "they don't just go for big lumps that head it and kick people".

=== Glenn Hoddle Academy ===
In July 2009, Burge had to return to England to renew his visa to stay in Japan. He participated in a pre-season friendly against Malmesbury Victoria for Conference Premier side Forest Green Rovers. He was offered a contract but rejected it and joined the Glenn Hoddle Academy in Spain on a two-year deal, stating he felt it would help to improve his technical skill. Burge scored the quickest goal in the academy's history, netting against Spanish side San Fernando after just 12 seconds. In March 2010, Burge played once for Conference South club Worcester City, by arrangement with the academy. In the 2010–11 season, Burge played for Jerez Industrial, the Spanish Tercera División club connected with the Glenn Hoddle Academy. He became established in central midfield after he recovered from numerous injury problems. He was sent off twice in 13 games and won the club's Player of the Month award for October 2010. They were in contention for promotion to the Segunda División B when a November 2010 article on the BBC Sport website described Burge as "the current star of the side".

=== Doncaster Rovers ===
Burge moved to Championship club Doncaster Rovers on a short-term deal on transfer deadline day, 31 January 2011. He made his Doncaster debut as a 69th minute substitute in a 6–0 home defeat to Ipswich Town on 15 February 2011. That was to be his only appearance for the club. On 17 March 2011, Burge joined League Two team Oxford United on loan for the rest of the season, after impressing in a reserve game against Colchester United which Oxford won 2–0. He went straight into the starting line-up for the match against Crewe Alexandra two days later, and provided the assist for James Constable's winning goal. His first performance at Oxford received praise in the local media. A week later, Steve MacLean opened the scoring against Burton Albion. Burge reportedly claimed the goal after the ball took a deflection off his heel on its way into the net for what would have been his first Football League goal. In mid-April 2011 Doncaster recalled him, and a few weeks later they offered him a new deal.

=== Hyde to Port Vale ===
In June 2011 he signed a two-year deal with Micky Adams' Port Vale. The League Two club had to pay Hyde a small undisclosed fee, as the Conference North side secured his contract from their partnership with the Glenn Hoddle Academy. He missed the start of the 2011–12 season with a knee injury, and in November 2011 it was revealed that he would have to undergo surgery to correct the problem. He did not feature in matchday squads for the rest of the season, and was transfer listed in May 2012. The door to the first-team remained open though, after Burge had an encouraging and injury-free pre-season.

He came off the bench on 14 August 2012 – his first competitive game for twelve months – and "pulled the strings to help Vale control the second half" in a League Cup defeat to Championship side Burnley. He made his long-awaited league debut at Vale Park four days later, replacing Chris Shuker 79 minutes into a 3–0 win over Barnet. Despite some impressive cameo appearances from the bench, a streak of wins kept Burge out of the first XI until 29 September 2012, when he made his first league start for the club at Valley Parade, in a 1–0 win over Bradford City. He scored his first goal for the club in the Football League Trophy at the Bescot Stadium; his 20 yards (18 m) left-footed strike helped Vale to battle to a 2–2 draw with Walsall, though he missed his penalty in the shoot-out victory. He opened the scoring in a 2–2 home draw with York City on 17 November 2012, and was selected on the League Two Team of the Week for his performance.

He established himself in central midfield over the New Year with "a string of impressive performances". However, on 12 March 2013 he missed a pre-match team meal, but claimed he made his own way for the match against Bristol Rovers, only to be informed that he was not in the matchday squad when he was just five minutes away from Bristol. He took to Twitter to put his side of the story across, and an angry Micky Adams responded by saying Burge's tweets were "absolute nonsense and he's going to be disciplined". Burge was suspended for two weeks for breaking the club's "social media guidelines" after club management claimed he refused to apologise for the incident. On 12 April 2013, with three games left of the season, Burge left the club by mutual consent having missed every fixture since the Bristol Rovers incident . Club chairman Paul Wildes stated that "this has been a difficult decision for both parties". Vale secured promotion into League One at the end of the 2012–13 season.

=== Newport County ===
Burge was linked with a move to Peterborough United in May 2013, though also stated that "I am confident I could do a job at Championship level". He also had a trial spell with Burnley. He eventually signed a contract with League Two side Newport County on 30 August 2013. Illness and injuries limited his contribution at the beginning of the 2013–14 season. He impressed in central midfield during the second half of the campaign and manager Justin Edinburgh was reported to have opened talks to extend Burge's stay at Rodney Parade beyond the summer. Despite these reports, Burge left the club in May 2014.

In June 2014, he was reported to have agreed terms with South African side Bidvest Wits of the Premier Soccer League, but the move was never completed. He had a trial with Cheltenham Town in March 2015 and impressed in a reserve game against Plymouth Argyle after being out injured for the season, but the club was unable to offer him a contract, even though his grandad was on the board.

=== Sutton United ===
In February 2016, Burge signed with National League South club Sutton United on a contract running until summer 2017. He contributed three goals in five games as the U's won promotion into the National League as champions of the Southern Division in 2015–16. He was forced to miss the rest of the season after his ankle ligaments were damaged from a heavy challenge he received during a 2–0 win at Wealdstone on 22 March. Burge made his National League debut in a 1–1 draw with Forest Green Rovers at The New Lawn on 9 August. On 9 December 2016, Burge was released by Sutton United as he looked to continue his career nearer to his Cheltenham home.

=== Eastleigh ===
Burge signed with National League side Eastleigh on 13 March 2017; caretaker manager Richard Hill said that "he likes to pass the ball and move well". He played five games for the "Spitfires" before being sidelined with an ankle injury.

At the age of 28, Burge applied for the vacant managerial post at Port Vale following the dismissal of Michael Brown in September 2017.

== Style of play ==
Keith Downing described Burge as "aggressive" and that he is "technically good and has a good frame". After arriving at Port Vale in June 2011, Vale manager Micky Adams stated, "Ryan is a creative central midfielder and will bring plenty of quality on the ball, but he is also a very hard-working individual". Neil Duncanson, the Glenn Hoddle Academy's commercial director said: "Ryan is very strong, powerful and suited to the front of a diamond in central midfield. He's a creative player who can take an excellent dead ball". Burge has said of himself that "I'm a midfield player who likes to put my foot in, as well as to get on the ball and create things. I try to be an all-round midfield player and do a bit of everything".

== Business career ==
Burge set up his own fashion label, Ten Club London, and sold the naming rights to American rock band Pearl Jam in 2018.

== Personal life ==
His grandfather, Rod Burge, was a member of Cheltenham Town's board of directors for over 25 years before his death in April 2014.

== Career statistics ==
Appearances and goals by club, season and competition
Club	Season	League			National cup (Note: Includes FA Cup, Copa del Rey)		League cup (Note: Includes Football League Cup)		Other		Total	
Club	Season	Division	Apps	Goals	Apps	Goals	Apps	Goals	Apps	Goals	Apps	Goals
Barnet	2008–09	League Two	1	0	0	0	—		—		1	0
Worcester City	2009–10	Conference South	1	0	0	0	—		0	0	1	0
Jerez Industrial	2010–11	Tercera División Group X	13	2	0	0	0	0	0	0	13	2
Doncaster Rovers	2010–11	Championship	1	0	—		—		—		1	0
Oxford United (loan)	2010–11	League Two	5	0	—		—		—		5	0
Hyde	2011–12	Conference North	0	0	0	0	—		0	0	0	0
Port Vale	2011–12	League Two	0	0	0	0	1	0	1 (Note: Appearance(s) in the EFL Trophy.)	0	2	0
Port Vale	2012–13	League Two	30	2	2	0	1	0	2	1	35	3
Port Vale	Total		30	2	2	0	2	0	3	1	37	3
Newport County	2013–14	League Two	17	2	0	0	0	0	0	0	17	2
Sutton United	2015–16	National League South	5	3	—		—		—		5	3
Sutton United	2016–17	National League	12	0	1	0	—		0	0	13	0
Sutton United	Total		17	3	1	0	0	0	0	0	18	3
Eastleigh	2016–17	National League	5	0	—		—		—		5	0
Career total (Note: Statistics for Machida Zelvia not recorded.)			90	9	3	0	2	0	3	1	98	10

== Honours ==
Port Vale

- EFL League Two third-place promotion: 2012–13

Sutton United

- National League South: 2015–16
