= 2012–13 Port Vale F.C. season =

Port Vale F.C.
2012–13 season
- Chairman: Paul Wildes (from 20 November)
- Manager: Micky Adams
- Stadium: Vale Park
- Football League Two: 3rd (78 points)
- FA Cup: Second Round (eliminated by Sheffield United)
- League Cup: First Round (eliminated by Burnley)
- Football League Trophy: Third Round (eliminated by Bradford City)
- Player of the Year: Tom Pope
- Top goalscorer: League: Tom Pope (31); All: Tom Pope (33)
- Highest home attendance: 12,496 vs. Northampton Town, 20 April 2013
- Lowest home attendance: 2,702 vs. Tranmere Rovers, 4 September 2012
- Average home league attendance: 5,727
- Biggest win: 7–1 vs. Burton Albion, 5 April 2013
- Biggest defeat: 0–2 (eight games) and 1–3 (once)
Home colours	Away colours	Third colours

The 2012–13 season was Port Vale's 101st season of football in the English Football League, and fifth-successive season in League Two. The club secured promotion into League One with a third-place finish. Administration scuppered the club's promotion chances in the previous campaign, and high-profile departures in the summer meant that manager Micky Adams had to rebuild his team from the ground up. His rebuilding efforts were severely hampered when Keith Ryder's expected takeover collapsed. Paul Wildes instead took over the club on 20 November.

There were no lengthy cup runs, as Vale exited the League Cup with an opening day defeat to Championship club Burnley, and were knocked out of the FA Cup in the second round with a loss away at League One side Sheffield United, before their progress in the Football League Trophy was halted by League Two rivals Bradford City. This allowed the "Valiants" to focus on gaining promotion, and their goal-scoring feats took them up to second place by 15 September, behind only defensive masters Gillingham. With the new owners in place, Adams could afford to sign experienced players in the January transfer window, and the team pushed on to establish themselves as the division's leaders. However, the wheels fell off as Vale struggled to score as they showed relegation form heading on from mid-February. After just one win in eight games, Vale rediscovered their previous form by mid-March and beat fourth-placed Burton Albion 7–1 in front of 10,978 supporters on 5 April. Promotion was secured 15 days later with a 2–2 draw with Northampton Town before a home crowd of 12,496. After promotion was secured, Paul Wildes resigned as chairman, and Norman Smurthwaite took full control of the club.

== Overview ==
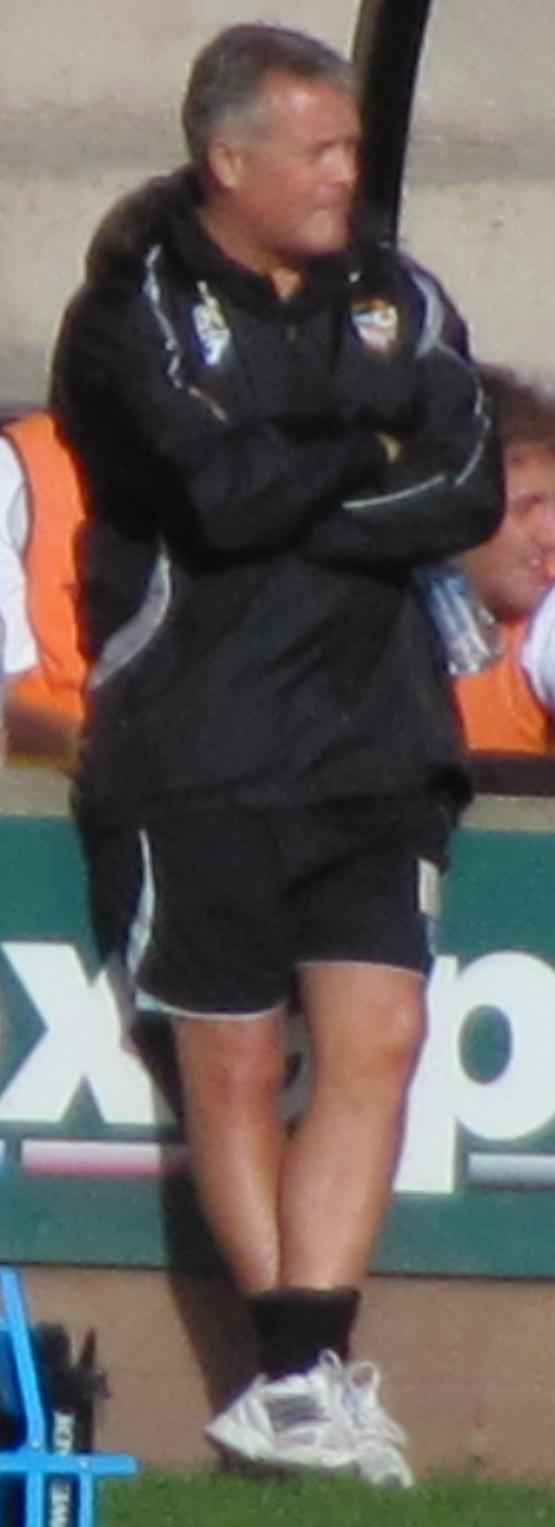
Manager Micky Adams

Captain Doug Loft

Goalkeeper Chris Neal

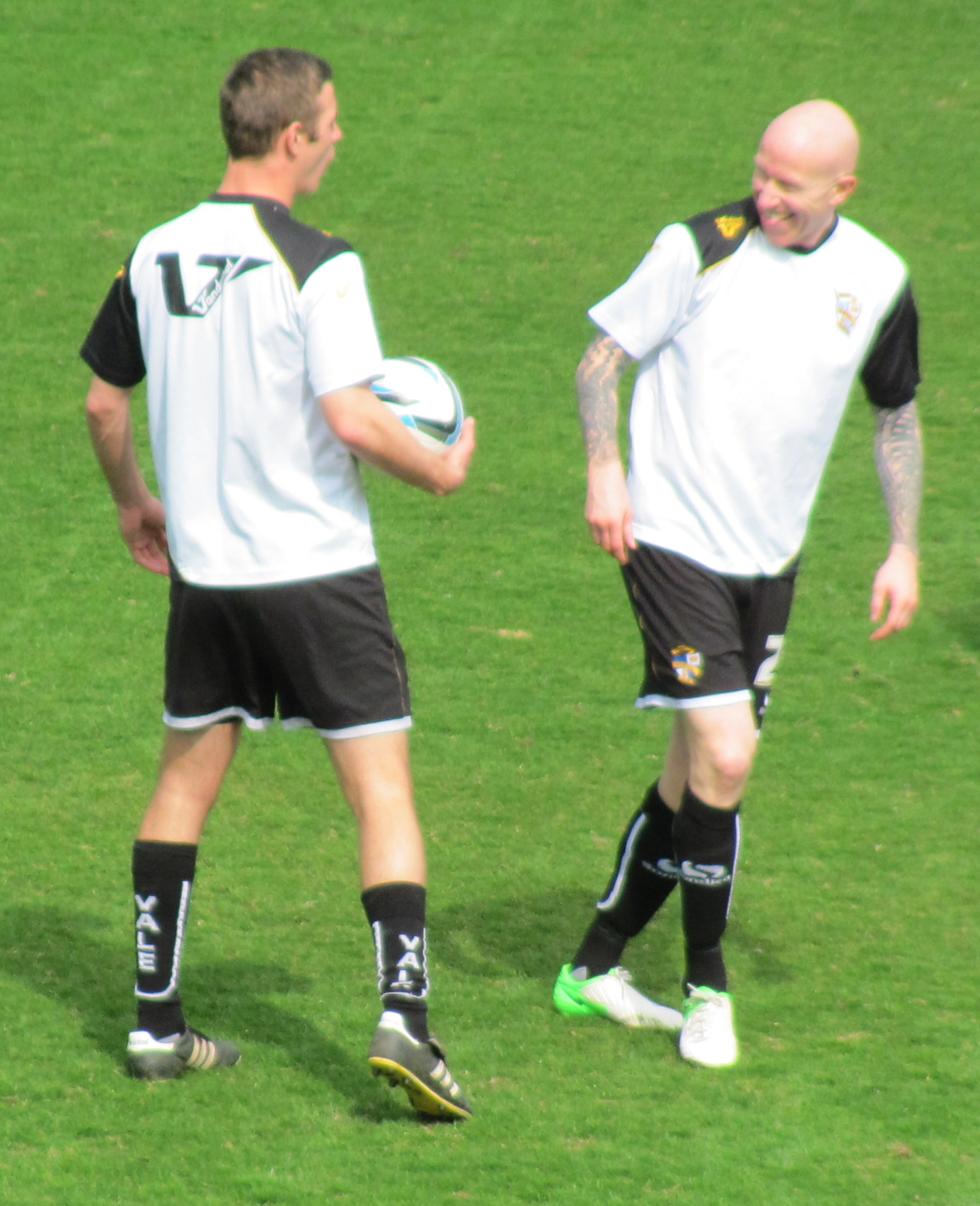
Tom Pope and Lee Hughes formed an effective strike partnership

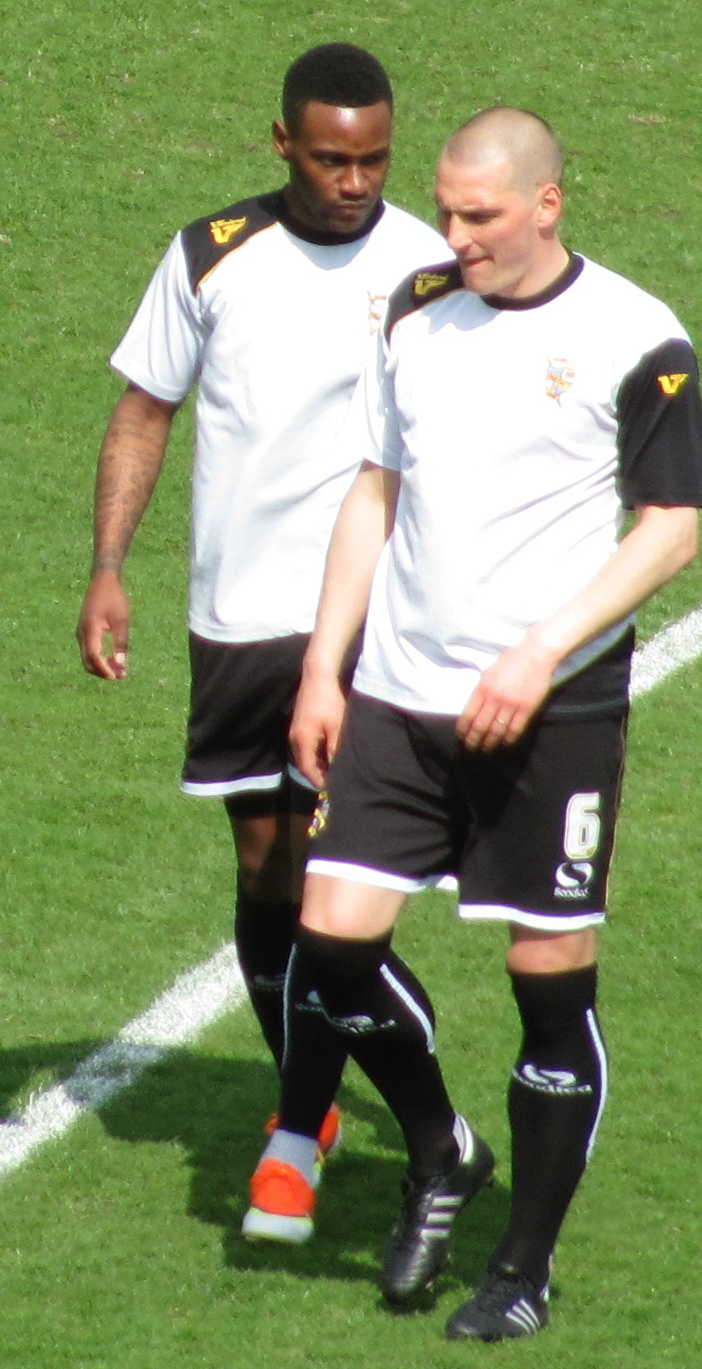
Talented winger Jennison Myrie-Williams and experienced centre-back Darren Purse

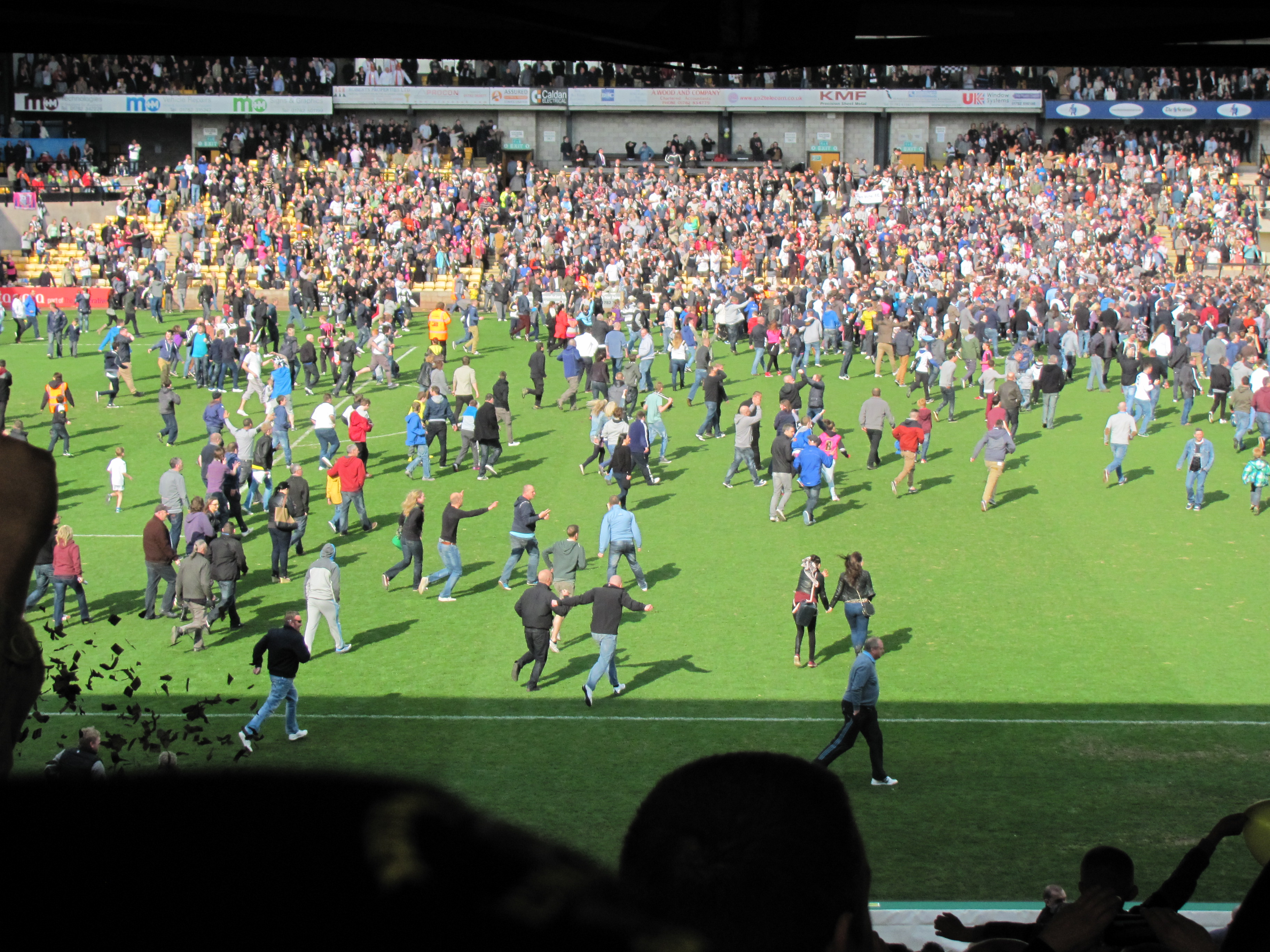
A pitch invasion ensued after promotion was secured in the final home game of the season against Northampton Town on 20 April 2013

=== League Two ===
On 19 June 2012, Port Vale was given odds of 40 to 1 of gaining promotion. The club had lost some of its best players as versatile defender Lee Collins, midfield general Anthony Griffith, and top-scorers Sean Rigg and Marc Richards all signed big-money deals elsewhere – the latter two moving to clubs expecting to win promotion out of League Two.

With the club's new owner in place, Adams signed six players early in July. He first signed midfielder Darren Murphy and winger Jennison Myrie-Williams (who had impressed in a loan spell at the club the previous season) from Stevenage, as well as Colchester United attacker Ashley Vincent. He then made another triple swoop by bringing in Shrewsbury Town goalkeeper Chris Neal, Crewe Alexandra centre-back David Artell, and former Wales international Richard Duffy. Highly rated striker Liam Dickinson, veteran forward Darren Byfield, and Irish attacker Tadhg Purcell also joined the club on trial. Adams appointed Doug Loft as club captain at the end of July. The pre-season tour of Ireland was hailed as a success, whilst Vale recorded wins in each of their encounters with non-League opposition. However, David Artell left the club as a free agent days before the start of the season, as he refused to sign a contract that reflected the club's status as 'in administration' (the initial contract he signed listed Keith Ryder as the club's owner, and was therefore invalid).

"The players have been absolutely amazing. I've told them that I can't thank them enough for their loyalty, character and commitment. They have thrown away a lot of money in signing these [revised] contracts... I'm embarrassed because I believed in Keith Ryder and believed in what he was doing. To find out that the players could have walked away for nothing after all the work we had done in pre-season was unbelievable. I hope the football club has hit rock-bottom and we can start to climb again, but I can't guarantee that."

— Manager Micky Adams had hoped to build a strong squad to challenge for promotion, but as Ryder's takeover seemed less probable, so did Vale's chances of promotion.

The team got off to a solid start in August, recording wins over a poor Barnet side and a much more resilient Morecambe. They lost away at Accrington Stanley despite having 56% possession and 12 attempts on goal. They continued their form into September, as 14 points from a possible 18 left them sitting second in the table. Only a bizarre own goal from Brian Saah won them a point at home to Torquay United before Tom Pope hit four against former club Rotherham United in a 6–2 victory; the win over Steve Evans's big spending "Millers" sent a message to the rest of the division that Vale were genuine promotion candidates. They then came from behind to win away at Plymouth Argyle, before putting a highly impressive Fleetwood Town to the sword with a 5–2 away victory. A top-of-table clash with Gillingham at Vale Park ended the "Valiants" impressive run, as the visitors claimed a 2–0 victory with a professional performance. Having named the same first XI for nine successive games, Adams introduced Rob Taylor and Ryan Burge at the expense of central midfielders Sam Morsy and Chris Shuker, and was rewarded with a 1–0 win over high-flying Bradford City in front of over 11,000 spectators at Valley Parade. Micky Adams was named as Manager of the Month and Pope was named as Player of the Month.

October opened with a dismal home draw with Dagenham & Redbridge, with goalkeeper Chris Neal making an uncharacteristic error to allow a blunted "Daggers" attack to claim an unlikely goal. The team then rallied to produce a convincing 2–0 win away at fourth-placed Exeter City, Pope's two goals taking him into double figures with 35 league games yet to play. However, injuries took hold of the small squad, with captain Loft sidelined with a calf injury, and winger Lewis Haldane forced to announce his retirement after failing to recover from a broken leg he sustained in August 2011. They played Oxford United on a Monday night in front of the Sky Sports cameras, and did themselves justice with a convincing 3–0 win, with both Ashley Vincent and Sam Morsy scoring impressive goals. An injury/suspension crisis in midfield then did little to prevent a patched up Vale side from coming from behind to beat Gareth Ainsworth's Wycombe Wanderers 4–1. They then travelled to Staffordshire rivals Burton Albion, and battled to a 1–1 draw after falling behind to a fluke goal. The month ended on a sour note at Sixfields, as John McCombe was sent off after breaking the leg of Northampton Town goalscorer Alex Nicholls; injuries and suspensions left teenagers Joe Davis and Kingsley James to form a makeshift centre-back partnership, though the score was kept to a respectable 2–0. For a second-successive time, a Vale player was named the division's Player of the Month; Ashley Vincent took the award, but credited his teammates, saying "this award is as much for them as it is for me".

Vale went three league games without a win on 6 November, as they lost a two-goal lead to draw 2–2 at home with Rochdale; the game turned on Sam Morsy's sending off on the 67-minute mark. Three days later, Adams boosted his midfield by signing former Shrewsbury player Sean McAllister to an eight-week deal. A day later and Vale travelled to Roots Hall and came away with a point following a goalless draw. Vale then went five league games without a win, after throwing away a two-goal lead for the second successive home game, to draw 2–2 with York City. Adams said "It's not a time for people to criticise and get on the players' backs, so I'll have to put my arm around a few of them, even if I feel like strangling them at times." His team duly went on to record a simple 4–0 win over Bristol Rovers, with Pope's hat-trick taking him to 20 goals in the season. On 22 November, Liam Chilvers re-signed on loan from AFC Telford United in order to provide more options in defence. Notts County striker Lee Hughes was also reported to have joined the club on loan, with a view to a permanent move; however, the next day it was revealed that the loan move would not go through as the relevant paperwork had not been sent into the Football League on time. Vale carried on scoring goals regardless, ending the month with a 3–1 win in miserable conditions at Aldershot Town. They also welcomed Calvin Andrew, who was signed to provide cover for Tom Pope.

Vale went into the festive schedule with a 2–0 home defeat to Chesterfield, who boasted four former "Valiants" in their team, including goal scorer Jay O'Shea. Adams tried to boost the team's confidence and said he then did "a bit of psychology with the players... sat them down, one-on-one, and reminded them about what and where they are." The talks seemed to work, as a Louis Dodds goal ensured that they came from behind at third-place Cheltenham Town to record a 1–1 draw. Assistant manager Mark Grew also employed psychology, telling the media that "We have the ability to bring people in, but hopefully we won't have to... if we lose three or four games, then the gaffer might have to freshen things up... but if we can pick up maybe nine points over Christmas and new year, then we wouldn't have a problem." On Boxing day, Vale headed to the New York Stadium for the first time and completed the double over Rotherham with a 2–1 win. They ended the year at the top of the table after beating the "Daggers" 3–2 in rain-soaked conditions.

The new year was welcomed with a poor showing at home to Fleetwood that ended in a 2–0 loss. There was good and bad news on 3 January, as Trinidad and Tobago international midfielder Chris Birchall was re-signed to the club as John McCombe was ruled out injured for "at least six weeks". Adams responded to the defeat to Fleetwood by making six changes at home to Plymouth, and was rewarded with a comprehensive 4–0 win over a struggling team reduced to ten men in the first half. He also signed experienced Argyle centre-back and captain Darren Purse. Gareth Owen and Darren Murphy both left the club, whilst veteran striker Lee Hughes was signed from Notts County. Liam Chilvers was also signed up until the end of the season. Both Purse and Hughes were handed debuts for the top of the table clash with Gillingham on 12 January, and played vital roles in the team's 2–1 victory. Adams then added another new face, with left-sided Sheffield Wednesday player Daniel Jones signed on until the end of the season. With the influx of defenders limiting first-team opportunities, Clayton McDonald joined Bristol Rovers on loan until the end of the season. Jones scored on his debut, helping Vale to earn a point away at AFC Wimbledon in front of the television cameras.

New signings Hughes and Purse gave Vale a 3–0 home win over Accrington on 2 February. Three days later, the bottom club, Wimbledon, arrived at Vale Park, and Vale won the game 3–0 thanks to goals from Hughes and Vincent (2). The next challenge was another club battling against relegation, Barnet, and Adams named the same team for the fourth-successive game; however, for only the second time in the season, Vale fans witnessed a goalless draw. Mid-table Morecambe then arrived at Vale Park as the club honoured former chairman Bill Bell, who died on 12 February; the game ended with a 1–0 defeat to ten-man Morecambe. Calvin Andrew was given a surprise start at Torquay, and rewarded Micky Adams with the only goal of the game. Adams sniped at online critics after the game, saying they "think they’re clever on their computers" but "I’m sure they’ll be disappointed we've won". However, Vale then tasted a 2–0 defeat at home to play-off hopefuls Exeter City, who put in a superb performance; Adams nevertheless found his team's lack of urgency going forward as a "little bit baffling".

Oxford beat Vale 2–1 on 2 March, ending Vale's five-month unbeaten run on the road. Adams then tried to add some steel to his midfield by re-signing tough-tackling Anthony Griffith from Leyton Orient. League Cup finalists Bradford then came to Burslem. He left with a point after the season's first goalless draw at Vale Park. With the gap between Vale and play-offs getting more slender, Southend successfully defended a two-goal lead at half-time to beat Vale 2–1. Adams admitted, "Promotion seems a million miles away with the way we're playing." Things then went from bad to worse at Bristol Rovers, with former Stoke player Ryan Brunt giving the "Gas" a 2–0 win whilst Ashley Vincent suffered a season-ending injury. Adams claimed that "idiots" in a "certain section of the crowd" were giving him "personal" abuse following the run of bad results and his decision to drop fan favourite Ryan Burge for disciplinary reasons. Full-back Adam Yates later said this low-point motivated the players to pull together to prove wrong fans that had barracked Adams. Burge was suspended for two weeks after refusing to apologize for making veiled criticism of the club on Twitter. Vale then put a poor York side to the sword with goals from Myrie-Williams and Hughes. Cheltenham Town proved a much sterner challenge, but Vale recovered from 2–1 down to win a crucial match 3–2, with Tom Pope hitting his third hat-trick of the season.

Vale held second place going into April, and though they failed to capitalise on their rivals dropping points on 1 April, they managed to come from behind to two Marc Richards goals at Chesterfield to secure a point. Four days later, Vale hosted fourth-placed Burton Albion in what was labelled as the biggest game of the season for the "Valiants". Reduced tickets of £9 ensured a crowd of 10,978. They were treated to a comprehensive 7–1 victory as Lee Hughes scored a hat-trick. Bottom-placed Aldershot were the visitors four days later, and were seemingly fired up after manager Andy Scott took offence to Adams saying that "[Aldershot] are down the bottom because [they] deserve to be"; Scott stated that "Sometimes managers say things to deflect from what is going on at their own club. We will find out if they have got the stomach for the fight and see if they want to get promoted as they have got a few clubs chasing them." The match proved to be low on action, and Vale surrendered a half-time lead to draw the game 1–1. On 12 April, it was confirmed that Burge had left the club by mutual consent. Vale could have won promotion the following day, and seemed to have done so after Liam Chilvers made amends for a horrific first half own goal by heading Vale into the lead on 89 minutes; however, an injury-time equaliser left the Vale still just short of their final target. Automatic promotion was effectively secured with a 2–2 draw against Northampton Town on 20 April; the two unlikely goal scorers were Chilvers and former "Valiant" turned "Cobbler" Lee Collins. Promotion was confirmed with a 1–1 draw with Wycombe at Adams Park on the last day of the season, in what was former favourite Gareth Ainsworth's last game as a player.

At the end of the season all out-of-contract players were rewarded with a contract offer, except for Darren Purse, Calvin Andrew, Clayton McDonald, and Kingsley James. Ashley Vincent rejected his contract, choosing instead to leave the club. Despite still being under contract, John McCombe chose to leave the club by mutual consent. Sam Morsy was the third to leave the club, after he rejected the two-year contract on offer in order to sign with Chesterfield.

=== Finances & ownership issues ===
The trauma of administration still afflicted Port Vale during the 2012–13 season, as Micky Adams was unable to sign any players until the club's new owner, Keith Ryder, was granted clearance from the Football League. The takeover deal was delayed for several weeks after Ryder faced difficulties in passing the league's 'fit and proper persons' test. The administrators lost patience in Ryder, and publicly stated that if Ryder did not pay the £1.3 million takeover sum before 1 August 2012 then his bid would be rejected, and 'plan B' would be implemented. The deadline passed without comment from either party. Confusion reigned as the administrators confirmed that they were open to negotiations with other parties and that it was up to Ryder to complete his takeover, as he had the opportunity, the funds and – according to Ryder himself – the inclination to complete his takeover. Administrator Bob Young stated that "We initially gave him a deadline of the end of June, which was then extended to 6 July. If someone comes back to us with the funding first, then we will obviously take that forward." Ryder responded that "I wake up every morning believing this is the day we will complete the takeover. If the deal does not go through, and someone else buys the club, there will be no-one more disappointed than me."

The time-sensitive nature of the situation was emphasized when the club revealed that the two pre-season friendlies at Vale Park would be played behind closed doors "as the club has been unable to carry out usual maintenance work during the closed season owing to the prolonged period in administration." The 18 players who signed new contracts in the summer did so on the understanding that Ryder would be the club's owner, and so when told that they had to sign revised contracts that offered less security they sought the advice of the Professional Footballers' Association – they technically remained free agents, free to join another club, until either they agreed to the revised contracts or until Ryder completed his takeover. All but one of the players agreed to sign revised contracts, allowing the club to at least start the season with a full complement of senior players. Ryder disappeared from the scene completely, losing some £170,000 he had spent on a non-refundable deposit and some pre-seasons costs. The off-field problems even extended to the first-team kit, as they spent the pre-season in only the grey away strip and played the League Cup first round game in a pink strip. This was because of a problem supplying the black and white home kit. The new away black and gold kit was released in mid-September, and the new home kit was released the following month. Fans could purchase seasons tickets for between £272 and £356, and could purchase matchday tickets for between £20 and £21.

At the end of September, Bob Young said that he was hopeful of selling the club by the end of October at the earliest, and that he would "be disappointed if we haven't sold the club by the end of the year". The new preferred bidder was revealed to be Wirral-based businessman Paul Wildes. On 17 November, the Roy Sproson status was revealed, as was new home shirt sponsor UK Windows Systems Ltd. Wildes completed his £1.25 million takeover of the club on 20 November.

"I have a lot of experience of fixing broken businesses. It's what I'm good at for 30 years. And while this is very different to what I've done before, the model is no different. If you don't have any debt, which we won't have, and you don't have any excessive payrolls for people driven by ego, which we won't have, this business can only go one way and that's up. The only ego issue is ensuring I deliver what I believe this business needs. But everything we do here will be for the benefit of the club, and ultimately for the benefit of the team and the supporters. We'll try to get more people into the ground, increase our turnover, encourage people to spend more within the business and that will enable me to put money directly into the playing budget. There's nothing clever about it. We'll only be custodians of this club, just like everybody else before us, but I'm hoping when people look back they'll see that the club is in a better place than when I arrived... It's a business which needs a lot, but not a lot. That sounds like a contradiction, but there are stupid things which are broken and simply by fixing them we'll make Vale Park a better place. The only way we can influence things on the pitch is by creating the commercial resources to increase our income. We'll filter that down to the squad. It's difficult to list priorities because there are so many things that are broken, damaged or tarnished – from the toilets to the stadium seating to people's perception of the business and the overall match-day experience. But this should not be a one-day-a-week venue. The resources here are massively under-used at the moment and we want to change that... We'll have a board for operational purposes, but there will be just two shareholders – Paul, who will be chairman, and myself, and we'll take no salaries or dividends. We're planning to take nothing out of this club whatsoever. We're bringing in people from within our current group of businesses, but it will be a very flat structure, and even their costs will come from within the group of businesses that we run, so the finance and operational side of things will not be a cost to Port Vale... If you're coming to the game, come earlier, drink our beer and eat our pies because everything we can do to increase turnover will directly go straight into the playing squad, It's that simple."

— Norman Smurthwaite, Wildes' advisor and the new club CEO, speaking upon the completion of the takeover in November.

After securing the promotion, Smurthwaite said, "I've never had any hobbies to speak of, but buying Port Vale has given me a passion. The club has reinvigorated me – it has saved me really, given me a new purpose." On 18 May, Paul Wildes made a shock decision to resign as chairman and sell his 50% stake to Smurthwaite, who became the club's chairman and sole owner; Wildes stated that "From many conversations with Norman, it's clear we have conflicting ideas on how to take Vale forward". It was revealed that Smurthwaite had funded the initial takeover, and that the pair had a disagreement following defeat to Bristol Rovers in March, with Smurthwaite insisting on a more public approach to take pressure off the manager and players.

=== Cup competitions ===
The FA Cup draw was not kind on the "Valiants", as they were forced to travel to Conference play-off hopefuls Forest Green Rovers at The New Lawn. Ashley Vincent and Clayton McDonald (scoring his first goal for the club) opened the scoring before Rovers levelled shortly after half-time; substitute Ben Williamson then scored a late winner to avoid a replay. The second round was also tough, particularly for Micky Adams, who was tasked with overcoming Sheffield United at Bramall Lane; the League One title chasers had sacked Adams and appointed Danny Wilson in May 2011. Ever ready with a quote, Adams said: "I just thought 'All those balls in that bag and they picked this one out'". Vale seemed certain to progress to the third round after Tom Pope put them into the lead before two late goals from Shaun Miller dumped them out of the competition.

As per tradition, Vale exited the League Cup at the first-round stage. They were beaten 3–1 by Championship side Burnley.

The Football League Trophy first round draw left Vale facing League One leader Tranmere Rovers for the second successive season. Wishing to advance in the competition, Adams picked a strong side, and Vale won the game 2–0 thanks to a brace from Jennison Myrie-Williams, who scored with a 30 yards (27 m) free kick and a penalty. For the second round clash with Walsall at the Bescot Stadium, Adams took the unusual move of naming his team a day in advance "to allow Vale fans a fairer chance to decide whether they think it is worth making the short trip down the M6". 19-year-old goalkeeper Sam Johnson made his debut in the game, and was unable to prevent the two "Saddlers" goals in a 2–2 draw. However, in a remarkable turn of events he went on to score the winning penalty as the 22nd penalty taker of the penalty shoot-out. However, suspensions weakened the team – Tom Pope's presence was especially missed – for the encounter with Bradford City, and Vale exited the competition with a 2–0 home defeat.

== Results ==
=== Pre-season ===
17 July 2012 Friendly	Alsager Town	0–8	Port Vale	Alsager
19:30 BST		Report	Pope 29'; Vincent 43' og. 45'; Purcell 49', 53', 88'; Williamson 72', 82'	Stadium: The Town Ground; Attendance: 450

18 July 2012 Friendly	Biddulph Town	0–5	Port Vale	Biddulph
19:30 BST		Report	Purcell 3'; Williamson 18'; Myrie-Williams 30', 41'; Dodds 89'	Stadium: Tunstall Road; Referee: Chris Jackson

21 July 2012 Friendly	Newcastle Town	0–2	Port Vale	Newcastle-under-Lyme
14:30 BST		Report	Pope 41'; Williamson 66'	Stadium: Lyme Valley Stadium; Attendance: 1,464

25 July 2012 Friendly	(Republic of Ireland) Athlone Town	0–5	Port Vale	Athlone
19:30 BST		Report	Pope 50', 77', 79', 81'; Dodds 52'	Stadium: Athlone Town Stadium

29 July 2012 Friendly	(Republic of Ireland) Galway United	0–3	Port Vale	Galway
19:30 BST		Report	Burge 28'; Dodds; Williamson 50'	Stadium: Eamonn Deacy Park; Attendance: 405

31 July 2012 Friendly	Ilkeston	0–2	Port Vale	Ilkeston
19:30 BST		Report	Pearson 35' (og.); Williamson 69'	Stadium: New Manor Ground; Attendance: 265

1 August 2012 Friendly	Stafford Rangers	1–3	Port Vale	Stafford
19:30 BST	Johnson 58'	Report	Dodds 17'; Myrie-Williams; Pope 63'	Stadium: Marston Road; Attendance: 398; Referee: Craig Taylor

3 August 2012 Friendly	Nantwich Town	0–1	Port Vale	Nantwich
19:30 BST		Report	Purcell 90' (pen.)	Stadium: Weaver Stadium; Attendance: 352; Referee: Rob Jones

7 August 2012 Friendly	Port Vale	0–1	Coventry City	Burslem
19:30 BST		Report	McSheffrey 42'	Stadium: Vale Park; Attendance: 0 (Behind closed doors)

8 August 2012 Friendly	Congleton Town	1–2	Port Vale	Congleton
19:30 BST	Southern	Report	James; Marland	Stadium: Booth Street

11 August 2012 Friendly	Port Vale	1–1	Tranmere Rovers	Burslem
15:00 BST	Goodison 17' (og.)	Report	Stockton 75'	Stadium: Vale Park

=== Football League Two ===
==== League table ====
Pos	Team	Pld	W	D	L	GF	GA	GD	Pts	Promotion, qualification or relegation
1	Gillingham (C, P)	46	23	14	9	66	39	+27	83	Promotion to Football League One
2	Rotherham United (P)	46	24	7	15	74	59	+15	79	Promotion to Football League One
3	Port Vale (P)	46	21	15	10	87	52	+35	78	Promotion to Football League One
4	Burton Albion	46	22	10	14	71	65	+6	76	Qualification for League Two play-offs (Note: Four teams play for one spot and promotion to Football League One.)
5	Cheltenham Town	46	20	15	11	58	51	+7	75	Qualification for League Two play-offs

Updated to match(es) played on 27 April 2013. Source: BBC Sport
Rules for classification: 1) Points; 2) Goal difference; 3) Number of goals scored
(C) Champions; (P) Promoted

==== Results by matchday ====
Round	1	2	3	4	5	6	7	8	9	10	11	12	13	14	15	16	17	18	19	20	21	22	23	24	25	26	27	28	29	30	31	32	33	34	35	36	37	38	39	40	41	42	43	44	45	46
Ground	H	A	A	H	H	A	A	H	A	H	A	H	H	A	A	H	A	H	H	A	H	A	A	A	H	H	A	A	H	H	A	H	A	H	A	H	H	A	A	H	A	H	H	A	H	A
Result	W	L	W	D	W	W	W	L	W	D	W	W	W	D	L	D	D	D	W	W	L	D	W	W	L	W	W	D	W	W	D	L	W	L	L	D	L	L	W	W	D	W	D	D	D	D
Position	2	10	5	7	3	2	2	2	2	2	2	2	2	2	2	2	2	2	2	2	2	2	2	1	2	2	1	1	1	1	1	2	2	2	2	2	2	3	2	2	2	2	2	2	2	3
Points	3	3	6	7	10	13	16	16	19	20	23	26	29	30	30	31	32	33	36	39	39	40	43	46	46	49	52	53	56	59	60	60	63	63	63	64	64	64	67	70	71	74	75	76	77	78

Source: Statto
A = Away; H = Home; W = Win; D = Draw; L = Loss

==== Matches ====
18 August 2012 1	Port Vale	3–0	Barnet	Burslem
15:00 BST	Dodds 8'; Myrie-Williams 20' (pen.); Pope 75'	Report		Stadium: Vale Park; Attendance: 4,608; Referee: Scott Duncan

21 August 2012 2	Accrington Stanley	2–0	Port Vale	Accrington
19:45 BST	Amond 43' (pen.); Gray 90+3'	Report		Stadium: Crown Ground; Attendance: 1,946; Referee: David Webb

25 August 2012 3	Morecambe	1–3	Port Vale	Morecambe
15:00 BST	Ellison 32'	Report	Morsy 1'; McCombe 89'; Pope 90+4'	Stadium: Globe Arena; Attendance: 2,164; Referee: Mark Brown

1 September 2012 4	Port Vale	1–1	Torquay United	Burslem
15:00 BST	Saah 69' (og.)	Report	Morris 39'	Stadium: Vale Park; Attendance: 4,721; Referee: Steve Bratt

8 September 2012 5	Port Vale	6–2	Rotherham United	Burslem
15:00 BST	Dodds 5'; Pope 16', 21', 68', 78'; Vincent 28'	Report	O'Connor 31'; Nardiello 54' (pen.)	Stadium: Vale Park; Attendance: 5,544; Referee: Mick Russell

15 September 2012 6	Plymouth Argyle	1–3	Port Vale	Plymouth
15:00 BST	Williams 18'	Report	Myrie-Williams 66' (pen.); Vincent 74'; Williamson 78'	Stadium: Home Park; Attendance: 6,080; Referee: Darren Sheldrake

18 September 2012 7	Fleetwood Town	2–5	Port Vale	Fleetwood
19:45 BST	Brown 39'; Gillespie 84' (pen.)	Report	Pope 29', 60'; Vincent 34'; Dodds 67', 78'	Stadium: Highbury Stadium; Attendance: 3,392; Referee: Nigel Miller

22 September 2012 8	Port Vale	0–2	Gillingham	Burslem
15:00 BST		Report	Burton 11'; Whelpdale 25'	Stadium: Vale Park; Attendance: 6,924; Referee: Darren Bond

29 September 2012 9	Bradford City	0–1	Port Vale	Bradford
15:00 BST		Report	Pope 37'	Stadium: Valley Parade; Attendance: 11,030; Referee: Paul Tierney

2 October 2012 10	Port Vale	1–1	Dagenham & Redbridge	Burslem
19:45 BST	Myrie-Williams 75'	Report	Howell 72'	Stadium: Vale Park; Attendance: 4,355; Referee: Tony Harrington

6 October 2012 11	Exeter City	0–2	Port Vale	Exeter
15:00 BST		Report	Pope 40', 62'	Stadium: St James Park; Attendance: 3,938; Referee: Robert Lewis

15 October 2012 12	Port Vale	3–0	Oxford United	Burslem
19:45 BST	Pope 30'; Vincent 51'; Morsy 61'	Report		Stadium: Vale Park; Attendance: 4,596; Referee: Keith Stroud

20 October 2012 13	Port Vale	4–1	Wycombe Wanderers	Burslem
15:00 BST	Williamson 59'; Pope 66', 87'; Vincent 90'	Report	Grant 20' (pen.)	Stadium: Vale Park; Attendance: 5,303; Referee: Carl Boyeson

23 October 2012 14	Burton Albion	1–1	Port Vale	Burton upon Trent
19:45 BST	Chappell 73'	Report	Williamson 75'	Stadium: Pirelli Stadium; Attendance: 3,975; Referee: Graham Salisbury

27 October 2012 15	Northampton Town	2–0	Port Vale	Northampton
15:00 BST	Nicholls 20'; Moult 43'	Report		Stadium: Sixfields Stadium; Attendance: 5,061; Referee: Richard Clark

6 November 2012 16	Port Vale	2–2	Rochdale	Burslem
19:45 GMT	Pope 27', 62'	Report	Grant 73'; Tutte 87'	Stadium: Vale Park; Attendance: 4,139; Referee: Andy Woolmer

10 November 2012 17	Southend United	0–0	Port Vale	Southend-on-Sea
15:00 GMT		Report		Stadium: Roots Hall; Attendance: 4,876; Referee: Gavin Ward

17 November 2012 18	Port Vale	2–2	York City	Burslem
15:00 GMT	Burge 30'; Myrie-Williams 44' (pen.)	Report	Rodman 67'; Reed 89'	Stadium: Vale Park; Attendance: 5,380; Referee: Jeremy Simpson

20 November 2012 19	Port Vale	4–0	Bristol Rovers	Burslem
19:45 GMT	Pope 20', 22', 67'; Williamson 35'	Report		Stadium: Vale Park; Attendance: 4,177; Referee: Andrew Madley

24 November 2012 20	Aldershot Town	1–3	Port Vale	Aldershot
15:00 GMT	López 29'	Report	Williamson 17'; Burge 47'; Myrie-Williams 76' (pen.)	Stadium: Recreation Ground; Attendance: 1,992; Referee: Mick Russell

8 December 2012 21	Port Vale	0–2	Chesterfield	Burslem
15:00 GMT		Report	O'Shea 37'; Darikwa 64'	Stadium: Vale Park; Attendance: 5,298; Referee: Brendan Malone

15 December 2012 22	Cheltenham Town	1–1	Port Vale	Cheltenham
15:00 GMT	Carter 61'	Report	Dodds 67'	Stadium: Whaddon Road; Attendance: 3,670; Referee: Mark Heywood

26 December 2012 23	Rotherham United	1–2	Port Vale	Rotherham
15:00 GMT	Agard 83'	Report	Dodds 55'; Pope 63'	Stadium: New York Stadium; Attendance: 10,502; Referee: Trevor Kettle

29 December 2012 24	Dagenham & Redbridge	2–3	Port Vale	Dagenham
15:00 GMT	Williams 18' (pen.); Doe 84'	Report	Pope 4'; Myrie-Williams 9'; Dodds 39'	Stadium: Victoria Road; Attendance: 1,697; Referee: David Phillips

1 January 2013 25	Port Vale	0–2	Fleetwood Town	Burslem
19:45 GMT		Report	Ball 26'; Goodall 39'	Stadium: Vale Park; Attendance: 6,092; Referee: Paul Tierney

5 January 2013 26	Port Vale	4–0	Plymouth Argyle	Burslem
15:00 GMT	Myrie-Williams 32'; Pope 55', 83'; Williamson 77'	Report		Stadium: Vale Park; Attendance: 5,168; Referee: Scott Mathieson

12 January 2013 27	Gillingham	1–2	Port Vale	Gillingham, Kent
15:00 GMT	Kedwell 21'	Report	Pope 4'; Hughes 20'	Stadium: Priestfield Stadium; Attendance: 8,392; Referee: Darren Sheldrake

24 January 2013 28	AFC Wimbledon	2–2	Port Vale	Kingston upon Thames
19:45 GMT	Midson 8', 42' (pen.)	Report	Jones 44'; Pope 58'	Stadium: Kingsmeadow; Attendance: 3,395; Referee: Graham Scott

2 February 2013 29	Port Vale	3–0	Accrington Stanley	Burslem
15:00 GMT	Hughes 50', 66'; Purse 54'	Report		Stadium: Vale Park; Attendance: 5,172; Referee: Andy Davies

5 February 2013 30	Port Vale	3–0	AFC Wimbledon	Burslem
19:45 GMT	Hughes 13'; Vincent 35', 75'	Report		Stadium: Vale Park; Attendance: 5,567; Referee: Mark Brown

9 February 2013 31	Barnet	0–0	Port Vale	Chipping Barnet, London
15:00 GMT		Report		Stadium: Underhill Stadium; Attendance: 2,398; Referee: Graham Salisbury

16 February 2013 32	Port Vale	0–1	Morecambe	Burslem
15:00 GMT		Report	Alessandra 63'	Stadium: Vale Park; Attendance: 5,513; Referee: David Phillips

23 February 2013 33	Torquay United	0–1	Port Vale	Torquay
15:00 GMT		Report	Andrew 28'	Stadium: Plainmoor; Attendance: 2,679; Referee: Keith Hill

26 February 2013 34	Port Vale	0–2	Exeter City	Burslem
19:45 GMT		Report	Cureton 11'; Coles 33'	Stadium: Vale Park; Attendance: 4,480; Referee: Gary Sutton

2 March 2013 35	Oxford United	2–1	Port Vale	Oxford
15:00 GMT	Potter 10'; Smalley 76'	Report	Loft 16'	Stadium: Kassam Stadium; Attendance: 6,322; Referee: Eddie Ilderton

5 March 2013 36	Port Vale	0–0	Bradford City	Burslem
15:00 GMT		Report		Stadium: Vale Park; Attendance: 4,281; Referee: James Adcock

9 March 2013 37	Port Vale	1–2	Southend United	Burslem
15:00 GMT	Hughes 64'	Report	Clohessy 19' (pen.); Assombalonga 31'	Stadium: Vale Park; Attendance: 4,858; Referee: Darren Sheldrake

12 March 2013 38	Bristol Rovers	2–0	Port Vale	Bristol
19:45 GMT	Brunt 7', 38'	Report		Stadium: Memorial Stadium; Attendance: 5,111; Referee: Fred Graham

16 March 2013 39	York City	0–2	Port Vale	York
15:00 GMT		Report	Myrie-Williams 7'; Hughes 48'	Stadium: Bootham Crescent; Attendance: 3,945; Referee: Andy Haines

29 March 2013 40	Port Vale	3–2	Cheltenham Town	Burslem
15:00 GMT	Pope 19', 58', 74'	Report	Mohamed 47'; Benson 54'	Stadium: Vale Park; Attendance: 5,867; Referee: Scott Mathieson

1 April 2013 41	Chesterfield	2–2	Port Vale	Chesterfield, Derbyshire
19:45 BST	Richards 14', 19'	Report	Purse 5'; Pope 85'	Stadium: Proact Stadium; Attendance: 6,669; Referee: Simon Hooper

5 April 2013 42	Port Vale	7–1	Burton Albion	Burslem
19:45 BST	Hughes 12', 22' (pen.), 51' (pen.); Birchall 25'; Pope 56'; Williamson 73', 90'	Report	Paterson 70'	Stadium: Vale Park; Attendance: 10,978; Referee: Gavin Ward

9 April 2013 43	Port Vale	1–1	Aldershot Town	Burslem
19:45 BST	Myrie-Williams 45'	Report	McCallum 74'	Stadium: Vale Park; Attendance: 6,197; Referee: Lee Collins

13 April 2013 44	Rochdale	2–2	Port Vale	Rochdale
15:00 BST	Chilvers 31' (og.); Kennedy 90+3'	Report	Pope 34'; Chilvers 89'	Stadium: Spotland Stadium; Attendance: 5,042; Referee: Richard Clark

20 April 2013 45	Port Vale	2–2	Northampton Town	Burslem
15:00 BST	Chilvers 38'; Collins 86' (og.)	Report	Carlisle 2'; O'Donovan 69'	Stadium: Vale Park; Attendance: 12,496; Referee: Keith Hill

27 April 2013 46	Wycombe Wanderers	1–1	Port Vale	High Wycombe
15:00 BST	Morgan 31' (pen.)	Report	Hughes 79'	Stadium: Adams Park; Attendance: 7,120; Referee: Mark Haywood

=== FA Cup ===
3 November 2012 R1	Forest Green Rovers	2–3	Port Vale	Nailsworth
15:00 GMT	Norwood 34'; Oshodi 49'	Report	Vincent 7'; McDonald 12'; Williamson 80'	Stadium: The New Lawn; Attendance: 1,753; Referee: Philip Gibbs

1 December 2012 R2	Sheffield United	2–1	Port Vale	Sheffield
15:00 GMT	Miller 90', 90+5'	Report	Pope 33'	Stadium: Bramall Lane; Attendance: 10,215; Referee: Kevin Wright

=== League Cup ===
14 August 2012 R1	Port Vale	1–3	Burnley	Burslem
19:45 BST	Shuker 9'	Report	McCann 11'; Austin 29'; Marney 42'	Stadium: Vale Park; Attendance: 4,055; Referee: Andy Haines

=== Football League Trophy ===
4 September 2012 R1	Port Vale	2–0	Tranmere Rovers	Burslem
19:15 BST	Myrie-Williams 57', 75' (pen.)	Report		Stadium: Vale Park; Attendance: 2,702; Referee: Steve Martin

9 October 2012 R2	Walsall	2–2 (5–6 p)	Port Vale	Walsall
19:45 BST	Cuvelier 26' (pen.); Grigg 47'	Report	Burge 49'; Pope 61'	Stadium: Bescot Stadium; Attendance: 2,845; Referee: Darren Deadman
	Penalties
	Bowerman (penalty scored); Paterson (penalty missed); Taylor (penalty scored); Cuvelier (penalty missed); Featherstone (penalty missed); Taundry (penalty missed); Brandy (penalty missed); Butler (penalty scored); Downing (penalty scored); Jones (penalty scored); Darlow (penalty missed)		Myrie-Williams (penalty scored); Shuker (penalty missed); Burge (penalty missed); Pope (penalty scored); Davis (penalty missed); Taylor (penalty missed); Dodds (penalty missed); Lloyd (penalty scored); Yates (penalty scored); McCombe (penalty scored); Johnson (penalty scored)

4 December 2012 R3	Port Vale	0–2	Bradford City	Burslem
19:15 GMT		Report	Jones 46'; Forsyth 55'	Stadium: Vale Park; Attendance: 2,786; Referee: Darren Drysdale

== Squad statistics ==
=== Appearances and goals ===
Key to positions: GK – Goalkeeper; DF – Defender; MF – Midfielder; FW – Forward

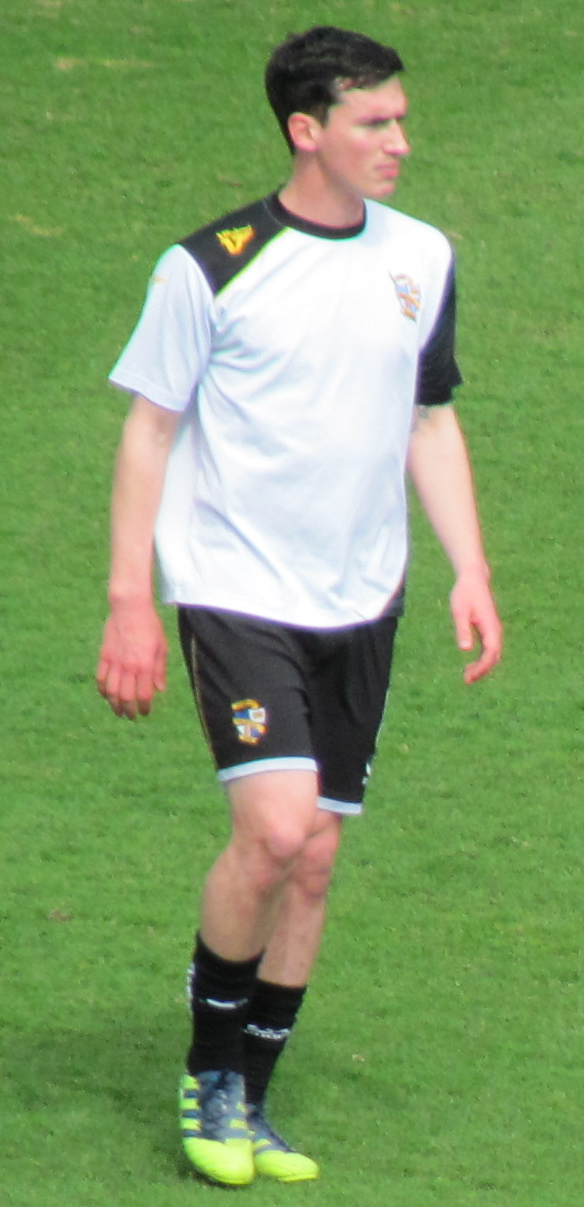
Louis Dodds contributed seven goals.

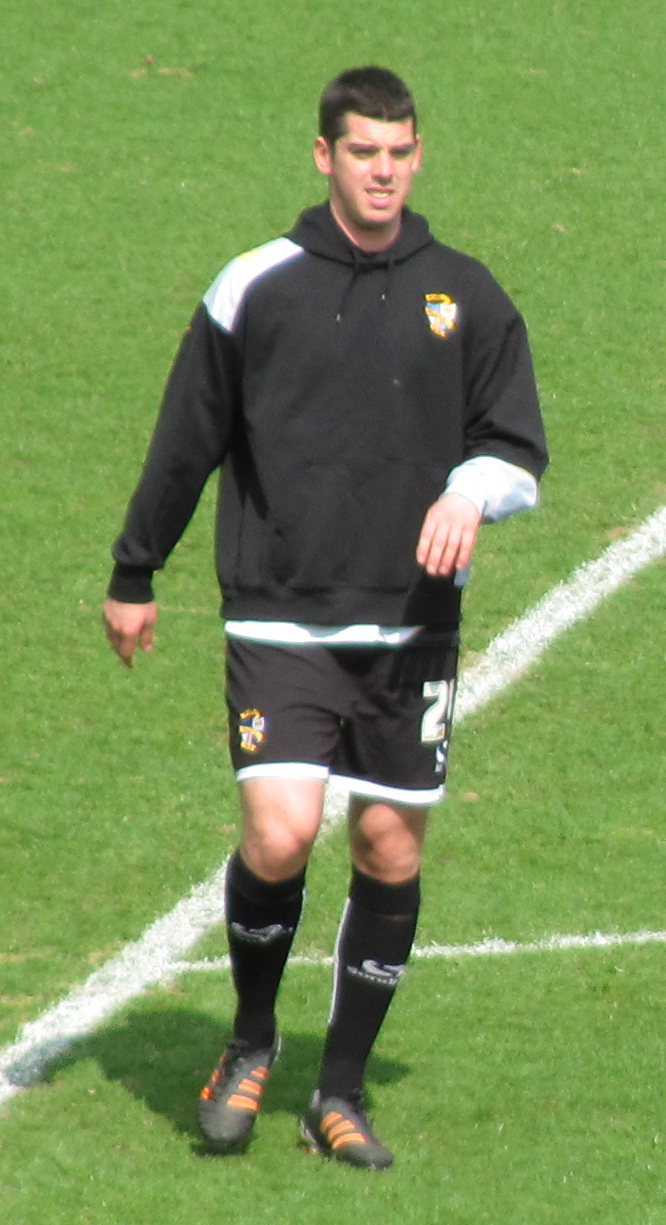
Richard Duffy played almost 40 games.

No.	Pos	Nat	Player	Total		League Two		FA Cup		League Cup		Football League Trophy	
No.	Pos	Nat	Player	Apps	Goals	Apps	Goals	Apps	Goals	Apps	Goals	Apps	Goals
1	GK	(England) ENG	Chris Neal	51	0	46	0	2	0	1	0	2	0
2	DF	(England) ENG	Adam Yates	32	0	26	0	2	0	1	0	3	0
3	MF	(England) ENG	Rob Taylor	32	0	28	0	2	0	0	0	2	0
4	MF	(Montserrat) MSR	Anthony Griffith	10	0	10	0	0	0	0	0	0	0
5	DF	(England) ENG	John McCombe	37	1	32	1	1	0	1	0	3	0
6	DF	(England) ENG	Darren Purse	17	2	17	2	0	0	0	0	0	0
7	MF	(England) ENG	Doug Loft	36	1	32	1	1	0	1	0	2	0
8	FW	(England) ENG	Louis Dodds	36	7	30	7	2	0	1	0	3	0
9	MF	(England) ENG	Jennison Myrie-Williams	50	11	44	9	2	0	1	0	3	2
10	MF	(England) ENG	Ashley Vincent	40	8	34	7	2	1	1	0	3	0
11	FW	(England) ENG	Tom Pope	51	33	46	31	2	1	1	0	2	1
12	GK	(England) ENG	Sam Johnson	1	0	0	0	0	0	0	0	1	0
14	DF	(England) ENG	Clayton McDonald	26	1	22	0	2	1	1	0	1	0
15	MF	(England) ENG	Chris Shuker	34	1	29	0	1	0	1	1	3	0
16	FW	(England) ENG	Calvin Andrew	24	1	22	1	1	0	0	0	1	0
17	DF	(England) ENG	Joe Davis	10	0	7	0	1	0	1	0	1	0
18	MF	(Egypt) EGY	Sam Morsy	32	2	28	2	1	0	1	0	2	0
19	FW	(England) ENG	Ben Williamson	39	9	33	8	2	1	1	0	3	0
21	DF	(England) ENG	Kingsley James	7	0	6	0	1	0	0	0	0	0
22	MF	(England) ENG	Ryan Lloyd	7	0	6	0	0	0	0	0	1	0
24	DF	(Wales) WAL	Richard Duffy	39	0	36	0	1	0	0	0	2	0
25	DF	(England) ENG	Liam Chilvers	21	2	20	2	0	0	0	0	1	0
26	MF	(Trinidad and Tobago) TTO	Chris Birchall	11	1	11	1	0	0	0	0	0	0
29	FW	(England) ENG	Lee Hughes	18	10	18	10	0	0	0	0	0	0
32	GK	(England) ENG	Ryan Boot	0	0	0	0	0	0	0	0	0	0
33	MF	(England) ENG	Dominic Thorley	0	0	0	0	0	0	0	0	0	0
36	DF	(England) ENG	Daniel Jones	16	1	16	1	0	0	0	0	0	0
Players who featured but departed the club during the season:
4	MF	(Republic of Ireland) IRL	Darren Murphy	3	0	3	0	0	0	0	0	0	0
6	DF	(Wales) WAL	Gareth Owen	2	0	2	0	0	0	0	0	0	0
16	MF	(Wales) WAL	Lewis Haldane	0	0	0	0	0	0	0	0	0	0
20	DF	(Gibraltar) GIB	David Artell	0	0	0	0	0	0	0	0	0	0
20	MF	(England) ENG	Sean McAllister	3	0	2	0	0	0	0	0	1	0
23	MF	(England) ENG	Ryan Burge	35	3	30	2	2	0	1	0	2	1

=== Top scorers ===
Place	Position	Nation	Number	Name	League Two	FA Cup	League Cup	Football League Trophy	Total
1	FW	England	11	Tom Pope	31	1	0	1	33
2	MF	England	9	Jennison Myrie-Williams	9	0	0	2	11
3	FW	England	29	Lee Hughes	10	0	0	0	10
4	FW	England	19	Ben Williamson	8	1	0	0	9
5	MF	England	10	Ashley Vincent	7	1	0	0	8
6	FW	England	8	Louis Dodds	7	0	0	0	7
7	MF	England	23	Ryan Burge	2	0	0	1	3
8	DF	England	25	Liam Chilvers	2	0	0	0	2
=	MF	Egypt	18	Sam Morsy	2	0	0	0	2
=	DF	England	6	Darren Purse	2	0	0	0	2
=	–	–	–	Own goals	2	0	0	0	2
12	DF	England	16	Calvin Andrew	1	0	0	0	1
=	MF	Trinidad	7	Chris Birchall	1	0	0	0	1
=	DF	England	36	Daniel Jones	1	0	0	0	1
=	DF	England	7	Doug Loft	1	0	0	0	1
=	DF	England	5	John McCombe	1	0	0	0	1
=	DF	England	14	Clayton McDonald	0	1	0	0	1
=	MF	England	15	Chris Shuker	0	0	1	0	1
				TOTALS	87	4	1	4	96

=== Disciplinary record ===
Number	Nation	Position	Name	League Two		FA Cup		League Cup		League Trophy		Total	
Number	Nation	Position	Name	Yellow card	Red card	Yellow card	Red card	Yellow card	Red card	Yellow card	Red card	Yellow card	Red card
18	Egypt	MF	Sam Morsy	7	1	0	0	1	0	1	0	9	1
7	England	DF	Doug Loft	7	1	0	0	0	0	0	0	7	1
5	England	DF	John McCombe	4	1	0	0	0	0	0	0	4	1
24	Wales	DF	Richard Duffy	8	0	1	0	0	0	1	0	10	0
23	England	MF	Ryan Burge	6	0	1	0	0	0	1	0	8	0
14	England	DF	Clayton McDonald	7	0	0	0	0	0	0	0	7	0
9	England	MF	Jennison Myrie-Williams	5	0	0	0	0	0	2	0	7	0
11	England	FW	Tom Pope	6	0	1	0	0	0	0	0	7	0
29	England	FW	Lee Hughes	6	0	0	0	0	0	0	0	6	0
10	England	MF	Ashley Vincent	4	0	0	0	0	0	1	0	5	0
36	England	DF	Daniel Jones	4	0	0	0	0	0	0	0	4	0
25	England	DF	Liam Chilvers	3	0	0	0	0	0	0	0	3	0
8	England	FW	Louis Dodds	3	0	0	0	0	0	0	0	3	0
1	England	GK	Chris Neal	3	0	0	0	0	0	0	0	3	0
6	England	DF	Darren Purse	3	0	0	0	0	0	0	0	3	0
4	Montserrat	MF	Anthony Griffith	2	0	0	0	0	0	0	0	2	0
3	England	MF	Rob Taylor	1	0	1	0	0	0	0	0	2	0
26	Trinidad	MF	Chris Birchall	1	0	0	0	0	0	0	0	1	0
17	England	DF	Joe Davis	0	0	1	0	0	0	0	0	1	0
6	Wales	DF	Gareth Owen	1	0	0	0	0	0	0	0	1	0
15	England	MF	Chris Shuker	1	0	0	0	0	0	0	0	1	0
			TOTALS	82	3	5	0	1	0	6	0	94	3

Sourced from Soccerway.

== Awards ==
National Awards	Winner
Football League Two Player of the Month	Tom Pope (September 2012); Ashley Vincent (October 2012)
Football League Two Player of the Year	Tom Pope
PFA Team of the Year	Jennison Myrie-Williams; Tom Pope
End of Season Awards	Winner
Player of the Year	Tom Pope
Away Travel Player of the Year	Chris Neal
Players' Player of the Year	Chris Neal
Young Player of the Year	Sam Johnson
Youth Player of the Year	Dougie Price
Goal of the Season	Louis Dodds (vs Fleetwood Town, 18 September 2012)

== Transfers ==
=== Transfers in ===
Date from	Position	Nationality	Name	From	Fee	Ref.
2 July 2012	MF	ENG	Jennison Myrie-Williams	Stevenage	Free transfer	
2 July 2012	MF	IRL	Darren Murphy	Stevenage	Free transfer	
2 July 2012	MF	ENG	Ashley Vincent	Colchester United	Free transfer	
6 July 2012	DF	GIB	David Artell	Crewe Alexandra	Free transfer	
6 July 2012	DF	WAL	Richard Duffy	Exeter City	Free transfer	
6 July 2012	GK	ENG	Chris Neal	Shrewsbury Town	Free transfer	
9 November 2012	MF	ENG	Sean McAllister	Shrewsbury Town	Free transfer	
26 November 2012	FW	ENG	Calvin Andrew	Crystal Palace	Free transfer	
3 January 2013	MF	TRI	Chris Birchall	(United States) Columbus Crew	Free transfer	
5 January 2013	DF	ENG	Darren Purse	Plymouth Argyle	Free transfer	
8 January 2013	FW	ENG	Lee Hughes	Notts County	Free transfer	
10 January 2013	DF	ENG	Liam Chilvers	AFC Telford United	Free transfer	
17 January 2013	DF	ENG	Daniel Jones	Sheffield Wednesday	Free transfer	

=== Transfers out ===
Date from	Position	Nationality	Name	To	Fee	Ref.
11 August 2012	DF	GIB	David Artell	Northampton Town	Rejected contract	
7 October 2012	MF	WAL	Lewis Haldane	Retired		
8 January 2013	MF	ENG	Sean McAllister	(Scotland) Cowdenbeath	Contract expired	
8 January 2013	MF	IRL	Darren Murphy	Macclesfield Town	Released	
8 January 2013	DF	WAL	Gareth Owen	Retired		
12 April 2013	MF	ENG	Ryan Burge	Newport County	Released	
2 May 2013	DF	ENG	Darren Purse	(Finland) IFK Mariehamn	Released	
2 May 2013	FW	ENG	Calvin Andrew	Mansfield Town	Released	
2 May 2013	DF	ENG	Clayton McDonald	Grimsby Town	Released	
2 May 2013	MF	ENG	Kingsley James	Hereford United	Released	
21 May 2013	MF	ENG	Ashley Vincent	Cheltenham Town	Rejected contract	
31 May 2013	DF	ENG	John McCombe	Mansfield Town	Mutual consent	
5 June 2013	MF	EGY	Sam Morsy	Chesterfield	Rejected contract	

=== Loans in ===
Start date	Position	Nationality	Name	From	End date	Ref.
22 November 2012	DF	ENG	Liam Chilvers	AFC Telford United	5 January 2013	
4 March 2013	MF	Montserrat	Anthony Griffith	Leyton Orient	End of season	

=== Loans out ===
Start date	Position	Nationality	Name	To	End date	Ref.
21 January 2013	DF	ENG	Clayton McDonald	Bristol Rovers	22 April 2013	
28 January 2013	DF	ENG	Kingsley James	Hereford United	22 April 2013	
