= Louis Dodds =

English footballer

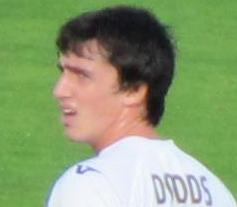
- Dodds playing for Port Vale in September 2010.

Personal information
- Full name: Louis Bartholomew Dodds
- Date of birth: 8 October 1986 (age 40)
- Place of birth: Sheffield, England
- Height: 5 ft 10 in (1.78 m)
- Positions: Midfielder; striker

Youth career
- 1997–2006: Leicester City

Senior career*
| Years | Team | Apps | (Gls) |
| 2006–2008 | Leicester City | 0 | (0) |
| 2006 | → Northwich Victoria (loan) | 6 | (3) |
| 2007 | → Rochdale (loan) | 12 | (2) |
| 2007–2008 | → Lincoln City (loan) | 41 | (9) |
| 2008–2016 | Port Vale | 289 | (51) |
| 2016–2018 | Shrewsbury Town | 47 | (8) |
| 2018–2019 | Chesterfield | 12 | (0) |
| 2018–2019 | → Port Vale (loan) | 12 | (0) |
| 2019–2020 | Chorley | 17 | (0) |
| 2020–2021 | Hednesford Town | 11 | (3) |
| 2021–2024 | Hanley Town | 31+ | (10+) |
| Total | | 478+ | (86+) |
- * Club domestic league appearances and goals

Louis Bartholomew Dodds (born 8 October 1986) is an English former footballer who played either as a midfielder or as a striker who is now a coach at Northern Premier League Division One West club Congleton Town.

After many years at the Leicester City Academy, Dodds turned professional at the club in 2006. He spent the 2006–07 season on loan at Conference side Northwich Victoria and League Two club Rochdale. He then spent the 2007–08 campaign on loan at Lincoln City. He turned down a new deal with Leicester to sign for Port Vale in July 2008. He helped the club to secure promotion out of League Two in 2012–13 with seven goals in 36 matches. He ended his eight-year spell at Port Vale when he joined league rivals Shrewsbury Town in May 2016. He left Shrewsbury for Chesterfield in January 2018, who were relegated out of the English Football League at the end of the season. He returned to Port Vale on loan for the first half of the 2018–19 season and then moved on to Chorley in August 2019. He signed with Hednesford Town in July 2020 and then returned to Stoke-on-Trent to join Hanley Town in May 2021, who would win the Midland League Premier Division title in the 2021–22 season.

== Career ==
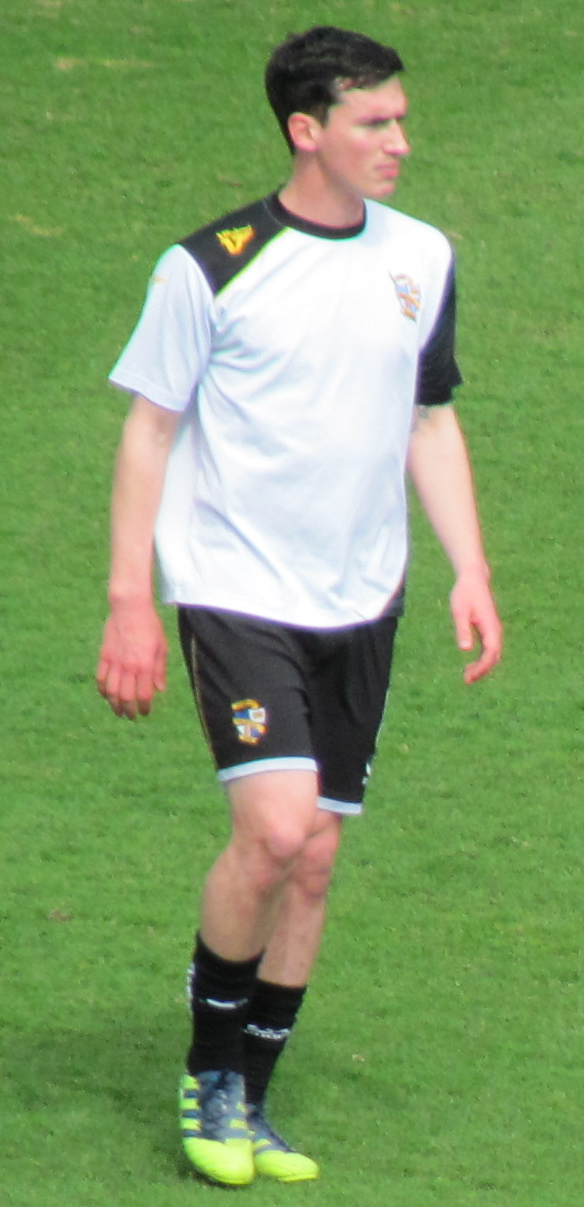
Dodds warming up for Port Vale before the match against Northampton Town on 20 April 2013.

=== Leicester City ===
Dodds was born Sheffield, though he moved with his family to Leicester when he was 3 months old and joined the Leicester City youth academy at the age of ten. He joined Leicester after being spotted by a talent scout while playing for Ratby & Groby, and whilst there earned himself a call-up to the England under-18 squad. He finished the 2005–06 season with a hat-trick in the final of the Westerby Challenge Cup and also picked up the Academy Player of the Year trophy, having scored 65 goals in three seasons for the academy and reserves. The Leicester management described Dodds as "the most natural finisher at the club".

Dodds signed a new contract with the "Foxes" to keep him at the club until the summer of 2007. On 9 October 2006, he was allowed to join Conference side Northwich Victoria on loan to gain some first-team experience. This loan deal was extended in November, before he was recalled by the "Foxes" at the end of the month due to an injury crisis. In February 2007 he joined Rochdale on loan, and scored an early winner on his first start. He scored two goals in twelve games for the "Dale".

In July 2007 he agreed to a season-long loan deal at Lincoln City. He scored nine goals during his spell with Lincoln City and was voted as scorer of the club's goal of the season for his long-range strike against Wycombe Wanderers. He showed an interest in joining the club permanently. He was offered a new contract at parent club Leicester, but instead joined League Two's Port Vale on 21 July 2008, penning a two-year deal.

=== Port Vale ===
On 9 August 2008, Dodds made his first start for the Vale in the opening game of the season against Luton Town and he was quick to win over his new supporters, scoring Vale's opening goal of the season with a 20 yards (18 m) right-footed shot. He further enhanced his popularity with the Vale faithful with a long range strike against Shrewsbury Town. He especially enjoyed great popularity with the club's female support, as he took away the club's 2009 "Mr Shirt of the Back" Award; he went on to pick up the award for three seasons running. He scored a total of ten goals in 48 games in 2008–09.

Manager Micky Adams arrived for the 2009–10 season, and transfer listed Dodds in late September, along with the entire Port Vale squad, after Vale slipped to a third consecutive defeat. Dodds maintained his first-team place however, scoring seven goals in 48 appearances. The club offered him a new two-year contract at the end of the season, which he duly signed.

Vale enjoyed a positive start to the 2010–11 season. However, in January 2011, Dodds found he was not a first-team regular under new manager Jim Gannon, despite calls from supporters for Gannon to include Dodds in the first XI. Yet he managed to force himself back into contention with an impressive strike to seal a 2–1 win over Macclesfield Town on 5 March, after coming into the match as a late substitute. After Gannon left the club just two weeks later, Dodds admitted that he probably would have left the club had Gannon remained in charge much longer. He scored his first hat-trick in the English Football League on 30 April, along with Justin Richards, in a 7–2 win over Morecambe. This made him the first non-striker to score a hat-trick for the club since Trevor Rhodes in 1934.

He was not in the first team at the start of the 2011–12 campaign, but instead, he came off the bench in five of the "Valiants"' first six games. Having started just three league games by the half-way stage, Dodds admitted that his versatility was preventing him from nailing down a specialized role in the first eleven. His third goal of the season came on 14 February, when he scored a "sensational" 15 yards (14 m) volley past Bradford City at Valley Parade. This was later voted as the club's Goal of the Season. He struck twice in a 2–1 win at Aldershot on 6 April, and was named on the League Two Team of the Week. He agreed to commit his future to the club in May 2012.

Desperate to play as a striker in the 2012–13 season, he got his wish as he was played as a deep-lying striker in partnership with Tom Pope. Combined with wingers Jennison Myrie-Williams and Ashley Vincent, the four-man strike force fired Vale into second place in the league over the first quarter of the campaign. On 18 September, he converted a "stunning strike with the outside of his foot" in a 5–2 victory over Fleetwood Town at Highbury Stadium – later this was voted the club's goal of the season. However, he lost his first-team place, before "a heart-to-heart with boss Micky Adams... got him back on track", and on 15 December he marked his first start for a month with his first goal in three months – it proved to be a crucial goal against promotion rivals Cheltenham Town in a 1–1 draw at Whaddon Road. Vale secured promotion with a third-place finish at the end of the season, with Dodds finishing on seven goals in 36 games. He agreed to sign a new two-year contract in the summer.

Towards the end of the 2013–14 campaign, Dodds was utilized in central midfield. He ended the campaign with four goals in 34 games, helping the club to a ninth-place finish in League One.

After impressing in caretaker manager Rob Page's first game in charge on 20 September, Page said Dodds was "magnificent" but needed to improve his consistency. Dodds fitted in well to Page's system, with a greater emphasis on possession than under Micky Adams. It took him 21 games to get on the scoresheet in the 2014–15 season, when he put in a man of the match performance in a 2–1 victory over Crawley Town on 20 December. He was named in the Football League Team of the Week for his performance in a 2–1 home win over Gillingham on 3 January. He passed the 300 career league game mark during the campaign, but admitted he was worried about his future at the club as his contract was due to expire in the summer and chairman Norman Smurthwaite was in no hurry to negotiate new deals with any of the playing squad. He signed a one-year contract with the option for a further year in June 2015.

He scored twice in a 3–0 win over Crewe Alexandra on 9 April, which relegated Crewe and earned himself a place on that week's Football League Team of the Week. He ended the 2015–16 campaign with eight goals in 44 appearances, and was voted Away Travel Player of the Year. After choosing to leave the club in the summer, he described how it was "an honour and a privilege to represent the club for eight years of my career" and that "I will always have a huge amount of love and respect for both the club and the fans".

=== Shrewsbury Town ===
Dodds signed a two-year contract with Micky Mellon's League One side Shrewsbury Town in May 2016. His first goal for the club was a 77th-minute winner in a first-round EFL Cup tie against Championship side Huddersfield Town on 9 August. He went on to finish the 2016–17 campaign as Shrewsbury's top-scorer with ten goals in all competitions. Paul Hurst, who was appointed as manager mid-way through Dodds first season at the club, admitted that the player presented him with "a nice problem" regarding team selection, having been deployed successfully either wide left, wide right or in a central attacking midfield role in his preferred 4−4−2 system. However, he was only a squad player in the first half of the 2017–18 season, featuring in just nine league games for the "Shrews".

=== Chesterfield ===
Dodds signed an 18-month contract with League Two side Chesterfield on 31 January 2018 after leaving Shrewsbury on a free transfer. He initially failed to secure a first-team spot for Jack Lester's "Spireites" after a series of niggling injuries caused his form to dip. Chesterfield were relegated out of the English Football League at the end of the 2017–18 campaign. New manager Martin Allen made him available for a free transfer in May 2018.

On 21 June 2018, Dodds secured a return to the Football League after joining former club Port Vale on loan for the 2018–19 season. Manager Neil Aspin said that Dodds had been keen on a return to Vale Park and "he has cost us next to nothing really". Despite a good pre-season, he was on the bench for the opening game of the campaign after Aspin decided to stick with his preferred formation and starting eleven. He failed to find the net in 17 appearances before his loan was cancelled early by Aspin on 25 January. He was released by Chesterfield in May 2019.

=== Non-League ===
On 1 August 2019, Dodds signed with National League club Chorley after impressing manager Jamie Vermiglio on trial. He made 20 appearances for the "Magpies" in the 2019–20 season, which was permanently suspended on 26 March due to the COVID-19 pandemic in England, with Chorley bottom of the table. He confirmed his departure from Victory Park in May 2020. On 1 July 2020, Dodds signed for Southern League Premier Division Central side Hednesford Town. The 2020–21 Southern League season was curtailed early due to the ongoing pandemic on 24 February.

On 6 May 2021, Dodds returned to Stoke-on-Trent to join ambitious North West Counties League Premier Division Central club Hanley Town, who were managed by his former Port Vale teammate Carl Dickinson. Hanley were transferred to the Midland League Premier Division for the 2021–22 season and would win the league title to secure a place in Northern Premier League Division One West. Hanley finished 16th at the end of the 2022–23 campaign and Dodds announced his retirement at the end of the 2023–24 season.

== Style of play ==
A skilful and pacey player due to his goalscoring ability, he was able to play as both a midfielder and as a striker. He stated that he preferred to play in the centre of the pitch. Despite his finishing skills from open play, he was a very poor penalty-taker.

"[Dodds] has a great brain and he sees passes that nobody else sees. He has unbelievable quality and he's always trying different things. He has that ability similar to how Dennis Bergkamp used to be at Arsenal. I'm not comparing him to Bergkamp, but he had that vision to spot a pass and time it well. If you can read it and make the runs, he will create a lot for you."

— Port Vale teammate Tom Pope was full of praise following a comfortable win over Barnet on 20 August 2012.

== Coaching career ==
Dodds was appointed to the coaching staff at Hanley Town upon retiring as a player. In October 2024, following the resignation of manager Ryan Shotton, Dodds departed the club. He then began coaching at Congleton Town, who were managed by his former Vale teammate Richard Duffy.

== Personal life ==
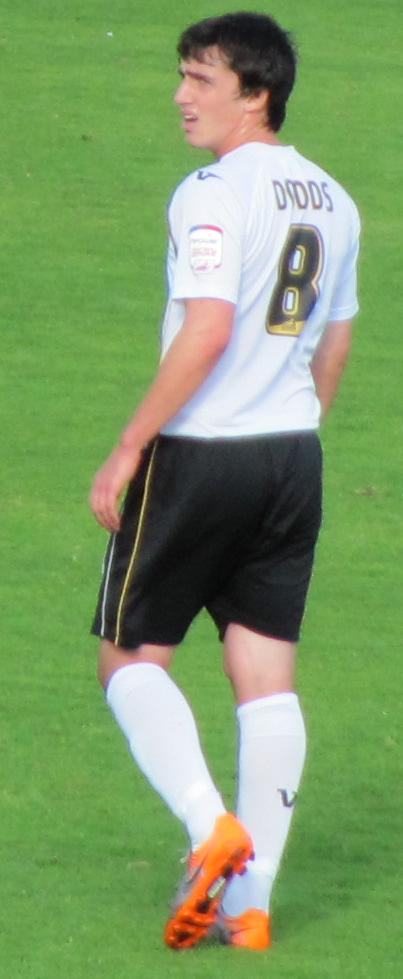
Dodds as a Port Vale player at Vale Park.

Dodds was born in Sheffield and grew up supporting Sheffield Wednesday, but now lives in Stoke-on-Trent with his wife and children. During his time at Vale Park he was considered the "ringleader of the dressing-room banter". He began writing a column in Staffordshire newspaper The Sentinel in November 2015. He became a schoolteacher after retiring from professional football.

== Career statistics ==
Appearances and goals by club, season and competition
| Club | Season | League | | | FA Cup | | EFL Cup | | Other | | Total | |
| Club | Season | Division | Apps | Goals | Apps | Goals | Apps | Goals | Apps | Goals | Apps | Goals |
|---|---|---|---|---|---|---|---|---|---|---|---|---|
| Leicester City | 2006–07 | Championship | 0 | 0 | 0 | 0 | 0 | 0 | 0 | 0 | 0 | 0 |
| Leicester City | 2007–08 | Championship | 0 | 0 | 0 | 0 | 0 | 0 | 0 | 0 | 0 | 0 |
| Leicester City | Total | | 0 | 0 | 0 | 0 | 0 | 0 | 0 | 0 | 0 | 0 |
| Northwich Victoria (loan) | 2006–07 | Conference National | 6 | 3 | 0 | 0 | — | | 0 | 0 | 6 | 3 |
| Rochdale (loan) | 2006–07 | League Two | 12 | 2 | — | | — | | — | | 12 | 2 |
| Lincoln City (loan) | 2007–08 | League Two | 41 | 9 | 2 | 0 | 1 | 0 | 0 | 0 | 44 | 9 |
| Port Vale | 2008–09 | League Two | 44 | 7 | 2 | 3 | 1 | 0 | 1 (Note: Appearance(s) in the Football League Trophy / EFL Trophy.) | 0 | 48 | 10 |
| Port Vale | 2009–10 | League Two | 44 | 6 | 2 | 1 | 1 | 0 | 2 | 0 | 49 | 8 |
| Port Vale | 2010–11 | League Two | 33 | 7 | 4 | 0 | 2 | 0 | 2 | 0 | 41 | 7 |
| Port Vale | 2011–12 | League Two | 35 | 8 | 2 | 0 | 0 | 0 | 1 | 0 | 38 | 8 |
| Port Vale | 2012–13 | League Two | 30 | 7 | 2 | 0 | 1 | 0 | 3 | 0 | 36 | 7 |
| Port Vale | 2013–14 | League One | 29 | 4 | 4 | 0 | 0 | 0 | 2 | 0 | 35 | 4 |
| Port Vale | 2014–15 | League One | 37 | 4 | 1 | 0 | 2 | 0 | 1 | 0 | 41 | 4 |
| Port Vale | 2015–16 | League One | 37 | 8 | 3 | 0 | 2 | 0 | 2 | 0 | 44 | 8 |
| Port Vale | Total | | 289 | 51 | 20 | 4 | 9 | 0 | 14 | 0 | 332 | 55 |
| Shrewsbury Town | 2016–17 | League One | 38 | 8 | 3 | 1 | 2 | 1 | 2 | 0 | 45 | 10 |
| Shrewsbury Town | 2017–18 | League One | 9 | 0 | 3 | 0 | 1 | 0 | 4 | 2 | 17 | 2 |
| Shrewsbury Town | Total | | 47 | 8 | 6 | 1 | 3 | 1 | 6 | 2 | 62 | 12 |
| Chesterfield | 2017–18 | League Two | 12 | 0 | — | | — | | — | | 12 | 0 |
| Chesterfield | 2018–19 | National League | 0 | 0 | 0 | 0 | 0 | 0 | 1 (Note: Appearance(s) in the FA Trophy.) | 0 | 1 | 0 |
| Chesterfield | Total | | 12 | 0 | 0 | 0 | 0 | 0 | 1 | 0 | 13 | 0 |
| Port Vale (loan) | 2018–19 | League Two | 12 | 0 | 0 | 0 | 1 | 0 | 4 | 0 | 17 | 0 |
| Chorley | 2019–20 | National League | 17 | 0 | 1 | 0 | — | | 2 | 0 | 20 | 0 |
| Hednesford Town | 2020–21 | Southern League; Premier Division Central | 11 | 3 | 0 | 0 | — | | 0 | 0 | 11 | 3 |
| Hanley Town (Note: Appearances for the 2022–23 season not known) | 2021–22 | Midland League; Premier Division | 31 | 10 | 5 | 1 | — | | 1 (Note: One appearance in FA Vase) | 0 | 37 | 11 |
| Career total | | | 478 | 86 | 34 | 6 | 14 | 1 | 28 | 2 | 554 | 95 |

== Honours ==
Port Vale

- Football League Two third-place promotion: 2012–13

Hanley Town

- Midland League Premier Division: 2021–22
