= Ashley Vincent =

English footballer (born 1985)

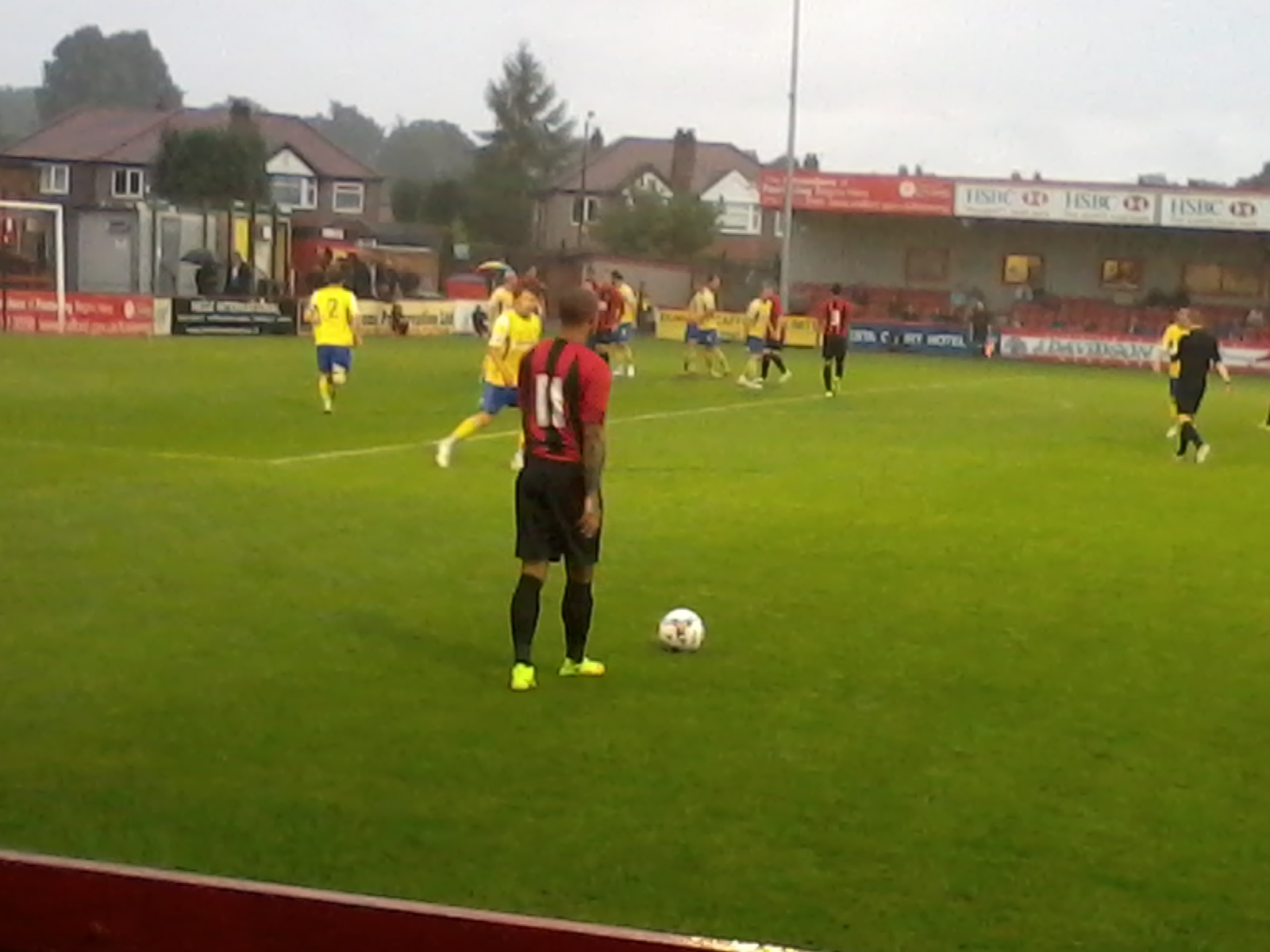
- Vincent playing for Shrewsbury Town in 2014

Personal information
- Full name: Ashley Derek Vincent
- Date of birth: 26 May 1985 (age 41)
- Place of birth: Oldbury, England
- Height: 5 ft 10 in (1.78 m)
- Positions: Striker; winger

Youth career
- 2001–2003: Wolverhampton Wanderers

Senior career*
Years	Team	Apps	(Gls)
2003–2004	Wolverhampton Wanderers	0	(0)
2004–2009	Cheltenham Town	113	(8)
2005	→ Aldershot Town (loan)	3	(0)
2009	→ Colchester United (loan)	6	(1)
2009–2012	Colchester United	65	(9)
2012–2013	Port Vale	34	(7)
2013–2014	Cheltenham Town	18	(2)
2014–2015	Shrewsbury Town	8	(0)
2015–2016	Worcester City	12	(0)
2016	Stourbridge		
2016–2017	Sutton Coldfield Town		
Total		259	(27)

Managerial career
- 2019–2020: Worcester City
- 2025: Cheltenham Town (joint-caretaker)
- * Club domestic league appearances and goals

Ashley Derek Vincent (born 26 May 1985) is an English former football player and manager who is a first-team coach at EFL League Two club Cheltenham Town.

Vincent played on the wing or as a striker and was renowned for his pace. He graduated through the Wolverhampton Wanderers youth system to win a contract with Cheltenham Town in May 2004. He spent the next five years at the club, playing in the 2006 League Two play-off final victory. He was loaned out to Aldershot Town in November 2005 and to Colchester United in March 2009, before he joined Colchester permanently in May 2009. He spent three years with the club before moving to Port Vale in July 2012. He helped the "Valiants" to secure promotion out of League Two in 2012–13 before he re-joined Cheltenham Town in July 2013. He signed with Shrewsbury Town in May 2014 and played a minor role as the club won promotion out of League Two in 2014–15. He later played non-League football for Worcester City, Stourbridge and Sutton Coldfield Town.

He was appointed Worcester City manager in May 2019 and stayed in the post until resigning in December 2020. He went on to coach at Cheltenham Town.

== Playing career ==
Oldbury, West Midlands-born Vincent started his career at Wolverhampton Wanderers, spending three years at Molineux and playing in the youth and reserve teams.

=== Cheltenham Town ===
In May 2004, Vincent joined League Two side Cheltenham Town on a two-year deal; manager John Ward had previously worked on the coaching staff at Wolves. He made his first-team debut on 7 August 2004, replacing John Melligan 68 minutes into a 2–0 win over Southend United at Roots Hall. He won his first start three days later, in a 2–0 home defeat to Scunthorpe United. He scored his first goals on 28 September, bagging a brace in a 5–1 victory over Dagenham & Redbridge in the Football League Trophy. He finished the 2004–05 season with three goals in 30 games.

On 18 November 2005, he joined Conference side Aldershot Town on a one-month loan. He played three games for Terry Brown's "Shots" in an uneventful stay at the Recreation Ground. With Cheltenham, he scored two goals late into the 2005–06 season to put himself back into first-team contention. He played 77 minutes of the play-off final at the Millennium Stadium, before he was taken off for Damian Spencer; Cheltenham held on to their 1–0 lead over Grimsby Town to win promotion into League One. Days before the game he signed a new two-year contract with the club.

Vincent picked up a serious knee injury during a reserve team match in August 2006. After missing the rest of the 2006–07 season due to the injury, he marked his return to full fitness on 15 August 2007 with a "stunning" equalizing goal against Swindon Town. He played a total of 40 games in 2007–08, finding the net twice. In July 2008, he signed a new contract with the club; manager Keith Downing stated, "The boy's had a cruciate injury and he's a young one as well. He's still growing, getting bigger, better and stronger." Vincent had explained to Downing that he wanted to play as a striker, rather than his previous position on the right side of midfield. On 26 August 2008, Vincent scored against Premier League side Stoke City in a League Cup encounter. Two months later he was sidelined for six weeks after fracturing his wrist in two places. In February 2009, he rejected manager Martin Allen's offer of a new contract and was linked with a loan move to Bradford City. However, he suffered a medial knee ligament injury the following month, which prevented the deal from going ahead. Despite this setback, he remained insistent on a move away from Whaddon Road.

=== Colchester United ===
In March 2009, Vincent joined Colchester United on loan until the end of the 2008–09 season. Manager Paul Lambert said that "He's got the enthusiasm and hunger and he'll be a big player for us next season. He's got pace, and when you've got that you've always got a chance." In May 2009, Lambert signed Vincent to a three-year contract for an undisclosed fee. However, Lambert left the club after the first game of the season – a 7–1 win over Norwich City – and was replaced by new boss Aidy Boothroyd. Vincent featured just 21 times in 2009–10, scoring three goals. He featured 42 times in 2010–11, scoring five goals.

Vincent missed six weeks with a knee ligament injury at the start of the 2011–12 season. In an interview given after his recovery, he admitted that he had feared the injury could have ended his career. Also, he hinted at a move to a Midlands club in the summer to be closer to his family. In December, he was struck down by a hamstring injury, which kept him out of action for several weeks. His injuries limited him to just 12 appearances in the campaign, as well as an appearance in the final of the Essex Senior Cup (which ended in a shock defeat to Canvey Island). At the end of the season, manager John Ward confirmed that he had played his last game for the club.

=== Port Vale ===
In July 2012, Vincent signed a one-year deal with League Two side Port Vale. He started the 2012–13 season on the wing, opposite Jennison Myrie-Williams, and scored twice in the opening six league games to fire the "Valiants" into second place. After claiming goals against Oxford United and Wycombe Wanderers, he was named as League Two Player of the Month in October 2012, but credited his teammates, saying "this award is as much for them as it is for me".

"There's been a lot of deserved praise for Tom Pope's goal scoring record, but Port Vale are no 'one man team' and Ashley's contribution this month was clearly worthy of recognition. So often the architect of goal scoring chances, we're sure Ashley will have enjoyed his goals this month and will want more as the season progresses."

— Emma Collins (npower Sponsorship Manager) explained why the Player of the Month panel picked Vincent as the star of League Two in October 2012.

He went 12 weeks without a goal before he netted twice in a 3–0 victory over AFC Wimbledon at Vale Park on 5 February 2013. On 12 March, he picked up an ankle injury that kept him out of action until the last day of the season. Vale secured promotion with a third-place finish at the end of the season, with Vincent scoring eight goals in 40 appearances. He was offered a new two-year contract but chose to reject the offer and to search for a new club.

=== Return to Cheltenham Town ===
Vincent was linked with a move to Notts County, and also had a trial with Scottish Premier League side Motherwell. He re-signed with Cheltenham Town – now in League Two and managed by Mark Yates – on a one-year deal in July 2013. He said the move was a 'homecoming' for him. He was not in the first-team for the first half of the 2013–14 season, and had to wait until February before winning his first start in the league. He was soon frozen out of the first-team picture once again and was released in May 2014.

=== Shrewsbury Town ===
Vincent joined Shrewsbury Town in May 2014, becoming the new manager Micky Mellon's first signing. In mid-September he stated that the New Meadow was "the best dressing room I have been in" in terms of team spirit, however, he played only a fringe role at the club and failed to make a first-team appearance after a 1−0 defeat at Plymouth Argyle in October 2014. Shrewsbury won promotion at the end of the 2014–15 season as runners-up in League Two, with Vincent leaving the club by mutual consent on 2 June 2015.

=== Non-league ===
Vincent signed for National League North side Worcester City in August 2015 following a successful trial spell. However, he left the club after five months when Tristian Dunkley took his place in the first-team whilst Vincent was sidelined with illness. Vincent signed for Northern Premier League club Stourbridge in January 2016. Gary Hackett's "Glassboys" went on to finish the 2015–16 season in sixth place, two points outside of the play-offs. He signed for Northern Premier League Premier Division rivals Sutton Coldfield Town on 6 July 2016. He helped the "Royals" to a 20th-place finish at the end of the 2016–17 season, one point above the relegation zone. He extended his contract with the club in June 2017. However, they were relegated in last place at the end of the 2017–18 campaign.

== Coaching career ==
Vincent returned to former club Cheltenham Town as an academy coach in November 2017, combining the role with his job as a football coach at Halesowen College.

=== Worcester City ===
Vincent was appointed as assistant manager to John Snape at former club, Midland League side Worcester City, in May 2018. He had previously agreed to take up the management post at Cradley Town, but backed away from the offer after feeling he would be "fighting against a tide" at the club. On 16 May 2019, he was appointed manager of Worcester City. He was given a vote of confidence by chairman Steve Goode in November. As a result of the COVID-19 pandemic in England, the 2019–20 season was formally abandoned on 26 March, with all results from the season being expunged. He resigned on 6 December 2020, the day after the club's FA Vase defeat at Shepshed Dynamo.

=== Cheltenham Town ===
Vincent returned to Cheltenham Town as the club's new lead professional development phase coach in November 2022 after Pete Haynes left to join the Southampton Academy. He was appointed as a first-team coach at Cheltenham by head coach Wade Elliott in July 2023. After manager Michael Flynn was sacked on 20 September 2025, Vincent was placed in joint interim charge alongside Aaron Downes. Steve Cotterill was appointed as the new manager ten days later, and he retained Vincent as part of his coaching staff.

== Style of play ==
Vincent could play as a winger but preferred a more central attacking role. In either position, he liked to exploit his pace to run at defenders. As a striker, he was often used alongside a target man.

== Career statistics ==
Appearances and goals by club, season and competition
Club	Season	League			FA Cup		League Cup		Other		Total	
Club	Season	Division	Apps	Goals	Apps	Goals	Apps	Goals	Apps	Goals	Apps	Goals
Wolverhampton Wanderers	2003–04	Premier League	0	0	0	0	0	0	0	0	0	0
Cheltenham Town	2004–05	League Two	26	1	1	0	1	0	2 (Note: Appearance(s) in the EFL Trophy)	2	30	3
Cheltenham Town	2005–06	League Two	16	2	2	0	2	0	0	0	20	2
Cheltenham Town	2006–07	League One	5	0	0	0	1	0	0	0	6	0
Cheltenham Town	2007–08	League One	37	2	1	0	1	0	1	0	40	2
Cheltenham Town	2008–09	League One	29	3	3	2	2	1	1	0	35	6
Cheltenham Town	Total		113	8	7	2	7	1	4	2	131	13
Aldershot Town (loan)	2005–06	Conference National	3	0	0	0	—		1 (Note: Appearance(s) in the FA Trophy)	0	4	0
Colchester United (loan)	2008–09	League One	6	1	—		—		—		6	1
Colchester United	2009–10	League One	19	3	0	0	1	0	1	0	21	3
Colchester United	2010–11	League One	37	5	2	0	2	0	1	0	42	5
Colchester United	2011–12	League One	9	1	2	0	1	0	0	0	12	1
Colchester United	Total		71	10	4	0	4	0	2	0	81	10
Port Vale	2012–13	League Two	34	7	2	1	1	0	3	0	40	8
Cheltenham Town	2013–14	League Two	18	2	0	0	2	0	1	0	21	2
Shrewsbury Town	2014–15	League Two	8	0	0	0	2	0	0	0	10	0
Worcester City	2015–16	National League North	12	0	2	0	—		1	0	15	0
Career total (Note: Statistics for Stourbridge not known)			259	27	15	3	16	1	12	2	302	33

== Honours ==
Cheltenham Town

- Football League Two play-offs: 2006

Colchester United

- Essex Senior Cup runner-up: 2012

Port Vale

- Football League Two third-place promotion: 2012–13

Individual

- Football League Two Player of the Month: October 2012
