= Achille Campion =

French footballer (born 1990)

Personal information
- Full name: Achille Pierre Camille Campion
- Date of birth: 10 March 1990 (age 36)
- Place of birth: Levallois-Perret, France
- Height: 6 ft 2 in (1.88 m)
- Position: Forward

Youth career
- 2004–2010: USL Dunkerque

College career
Years	Team	Apps	(Gls)
2010–2011	Belhaven Blazers	36	(21)
2012–2013	UC Santa Barbara Gauchos	25	(13)

Senior career*
Years	Team	Apps	(Gls)
2011	Baton Rouge Capitals	15	(10)
2012–2013	Ventura County Fusion	1	(0)
2014	Norrby IF	6	(1)
2014	→ Port Vale (loan)	2	(0)
2015–2016	Port Vale	10	(1)
2015	→ Torquay United (loan)	3	(0)
2016	Sligo Rovers	11	(4)
2017–2018	Cork City	17	(1)
2018	→ Linfield (loan)	15	(2)
2018	St Patrick's Athletic	5	(2)
Total		85	(21)
- * Club domestic league appearances and goals

Achille Pierre Camille Campion (born 10 March 1990) is a French former footballer who played as a forward.

He played youth football for USL Dunkerque, before playing college football in the United States for Belhaven Blazers, UC Santa Barbara Gauchos, Baton Rouge Capitals, and Ventura County Fusion. He signed with English club Port Vale via Swedish club Norrby IF in 2014. He was loaned out to Torquay United in November 2015, and after being released by Port Vale signed with Irish club Sligo Rovers in August 2016. He switched to Cork City three months later. He helped the club to win the League of Ireland Premier Division, the FAI Cup, and the President of Ireland's Cup in the 2017 season. He joined Linfield on loan in January 2018, before transferring to St Patrick's Athletic in August 2018.

== Early life and education ==
Campion was born on 10 March 1990 in Levallois-Perret, France. He played in the youth sides of USL Dunkerque from 2004 through 2010 and captained the under-18s in the Coupe Gambardella.

He left his native France to attend college in the United States at Belhaven University in Jackson, Mississippi. While on campus, he was a student-athlete, playing for the Belhaven Blazers men's soccer team. In his two years there, he appeared in 36 games for the Blazers, scoring 21 goals and assisting on 5 others. Campion then enrolled at the University of California, Santa Barbara, where he played for the UC Santa Barbara Gauchos men's soccer team for his final two years of eligibility. With the Gauchos, he appeared in 25 games, collecting 13 goals and 3 assists.

After ending his playing career in 2018, he went on to further his education by studying for a master's degree in Business Administration.

== Career ==
=== Amateur US clubs ===
Campion played with amateur USL Premier Development League sides Baton Rouge Capitals and Ventura County Fusion while in college. While with Baton Rouge, he appeared in 15 games and scored 10 goals with 3 assists. Campion was named to the PDL's Southern Conference Team of the Year in the 2011 season. He stayed two seasons with Ventura County, but only appeared in one game without recording any points.

=== Norrby IF ===
Campion signed with Swedish Division 1 side Norrby IF in 2013 after leaving UC Santa Barbara and made his debut on 21 April 2014, scoring in extra time.

Despite being under contract at Norrby IF, Campion went on a number of trials in Summer 2014 with Sheffield Wednesday, Yeovil Town, Ipswich Town, and Bradford City.

=== Port Vale ===
He was signed on loan by Port Vale on a deal until 1 January 2015. A thigh injury caused a delay in his debut for the club, but made his first appearance with the Port Vale Reserves on 15 October 2014 in a 5–1 win over Wigan Reserves with Campion scoring twice. He made his debut in the Football League on 29 November, coming on for Ben Williamson 81 minutes into a 2–2 draw at Gillingham. His transfer to Port Vale from Norrby was made permanent on 2 January 2015. Manager Rob Page handed him an 18-month contract and stated that he hoped to turn the player into an asset for the club. He scored his first goal in professional football at Vale Park on 7 February, in a 2–2 draw with Bradford City. After the game Page defended his decision to restrict Campion's playing time despite his success at reserve level, saying he did not want to "throw him in the deep end straight away".

Page announced he would look to loan him out at the start of the 2015–16 season as Uche Ikpeazu, Louis Dodds, Ebo Andoh and A-Jay Leitch-Smith were all preferred ahead of Campion on the opening day of the season, and JJ Hooper also joined the club two days later. He began training with National League side Torquay United on 22 October, and agreed a one-month loan deal with the club seven days later after "Gulls" manager Kevin Nicholson was impressed by his character. After making one substitute appearance he had a chance to establish himself in the first-team following a three-game suspension to Tyrone Marsh. However, he broke his nose on his second start for the club and had to be taken off early in the second half, and the injury then left him unable to feature for the rest of his loan spell. He was released by Port Vale in May 2016. Chairman Norman Smurthwaite used Twitter to express his view that Campion had been treated unfairly by former manager Page and said he hoped to bring the striker back for pre-season.

=== Ireland ===
Campion signed with League of Ireland Premier Division club Sligo Rovers in August 2016. Manager Dave Robertson said that "he really fits what we're looking for" as Campion scored on his debut, in a 5–0 win over Wexford Youths on 5 August.

He signed with Cork City in November 2016, with manager John Caulfield saying that "he’ll create lot of goals and score a lot of goals, and that’s what we need". He scored two goals in 23 appearances across the 2017 season, helping the "Rebel Army" to win both the Premier Division title and the President of Ireland's Cup, though he was an unused substitute in the final at Turners Cross. On 4 November, he entered the final of the FAI Cup at the Aviva Stadium as a substitute in extra time, and went on to score the equalising goal of a 1–1 draw; Cork went on to win the trophy on penalties. He was regarded to have failed to establish himself as a starter while playing for the club.

On 2 January 2018, Campion joined NIFL Premiership club Linfield on loan for the rest of the 2017–18 season; manager David Healy said "he's a player we know well and have seen play live several times". He scored two goals in 16 appearances for the "Blues" as they posted a fourth-place finish at the end of the 2017–18 campaign. He left Cork City on 26 July 2018.

On 16 August 2018, Campion joined Dublin club St Patrick's Athletic on a contract to run until the end of the 2018 season.

== Style of play ==
In September 2014, the Port Vale website described him as "a strong target man, who is good at holding up the ball, can finish well when given the opportunity, and due to his size is also an aerial threat".

== Career statistics ==
Appearances and goals by club, season and competition
Club	Season	League			National Cup (Note: nIncludes the Svenska Cupen, FA Cup, FAI Cup.)		League Cup (Note: Includes EFL Cup, League of Ireland Cup.)		Other		Total	
Club	Season	Division	Apps	Goals	Apps	Goals	Apps	Goals	Apps	Goals	Apps	Goals
Baton Rouge Capitals	2011	Premier Development League	15	10	0	0	—		0	0	15	10
Ventura County Fusion	2012	Premier Development League	0	0	0	0	—		0	0	0	0
Ventura County Fusion	2013	Premier Development League	1	0	0	0	—		0	0	1	0
Ventura County Fusion	Total		1	0	0	0	0	0	0	0	1	0
Norrby IF	2014	Division 1	6	1	1	0	—		0	0	7	1
Port Vale	2014–15	League One	12	1	0	0	0	0	0	0	12	1
Port Vale	2015–16	League One	0	0	0	0	0	0	0	0	0	0
Port Vale	Total		12	1	0	0	0	0	0	0	12	1
Torquay United (loan)	2015–16	National League	3	0	0	0	—		0	0	3	0
Sligo Rovers	2016	League of Ireland Premier Division	11	4	1	0	0	0	0	0	12	4
Cork City	2017	League of Ireland Premier Division	17	1	3	1	3	0	0	0	23	2
Cork City	2018	League of Ireland Premier Division	0	0	0	0	0	0	0	0	0	0
Cork City	Total		17	1	3	1	3	0	0	0	23	2
Linfield (loan)	2017–18	NIFL Premiership	15	2	1	0	0	0	0	0	16	2
St Patrick's Athletic	2018	League of Ireland Premier Division	5	2	1	0	0	0	2	1	8	3
Career total			85	21	7	1	3	0	2	1	97	23

== Awards and honours ==
Individual

- USL Premier Development League Southern Conference Team of the Year: 2011

Cork City

- League of Ireland Premier Division: 2017
- President of Ireland's Cup: 2017
- FAI Cup: 2017
