= 2015–16 Port Vale F.C. season =

Port Vale F.C.
2015–16 season
- Chairman: Norman Smurthwaite
- Manager: Rob Page
- Stadium: Vale Park
- Football League One: 12th (65 points)
- FA Cup: Second Round (eliminated by Exeter City)
- League Cup: Second Round (eliminated by West Bromwich Albion)
- Football League Trophy: Second Round (eliminated by Blackpool)
- Player of the Year: Anthony Grant
- Top goalscorer: League: A-Jay Leitch-Smith (10); All: A-Jay Leitch-Smith (12)
- Highest home attendance: 6,822 vs. Sheffield United, 3 October 2015
- Lowest home attendance: 2,571 vs. Carlisle United, 1 September 2015
- Average home league attendance: 4,993
- Biggest win: 3–0 (twice) and 4–1 (once)
- Biggest defeat: 0–5 vs. Walsall, 8 May 2016
Home colours	Away colours	Third colours

The 2015–16 season was Port Vale's 104th season of football in the English Football League, and third-successive season in League One. It was manager Rob Page's first full season in management.

Chairman Norman Smurthwaite announced a cut in the wage bill. He reduced contract offers for many out-of-contract players, which led to Mark Marshall, Ben Williamson and top-scorer Tom Pope leaving the club on free transfers after rejecting contract offers. A new youth policy was unveiled, and eight free agents, five youth team players and two loan players were signed at the start of the campaign. They made an encouraging start to the campaign, with new names Enoch Andoh and Jak Alnwick impressing, beating Championship side Burnley in the League Cup before going out on penalties to Premier League club West Bromwich Albion. However, a poor defeat in the second round of the FA Cup to League Two side Exeter City cost the club a lucrative third round tie with Liverpool and prompted Smurthwaite to put the club up for sale officially.

Vale remained positioned between 13th and 8th from November onwards, and realistic hopes of a play-off position were ended after a run of just one point from four games from 19 March. They ended this run of poor form by relegating local rivals Crewe Alexandra on 2 April. They were reliant on loan striker Uche Ikpeazu for goals early in the campaign before Louis Dodds and A-Jay Leitch-Smith, in particular, found scoring form in the latter half of the season.

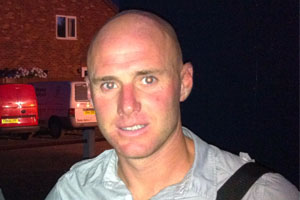
Rob Page had a successful first season in management.

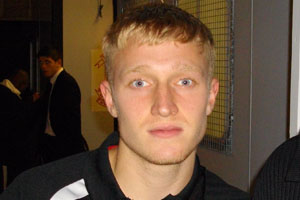
A-Jay Leitch-Smith finished as top-scorer with 12 goals.

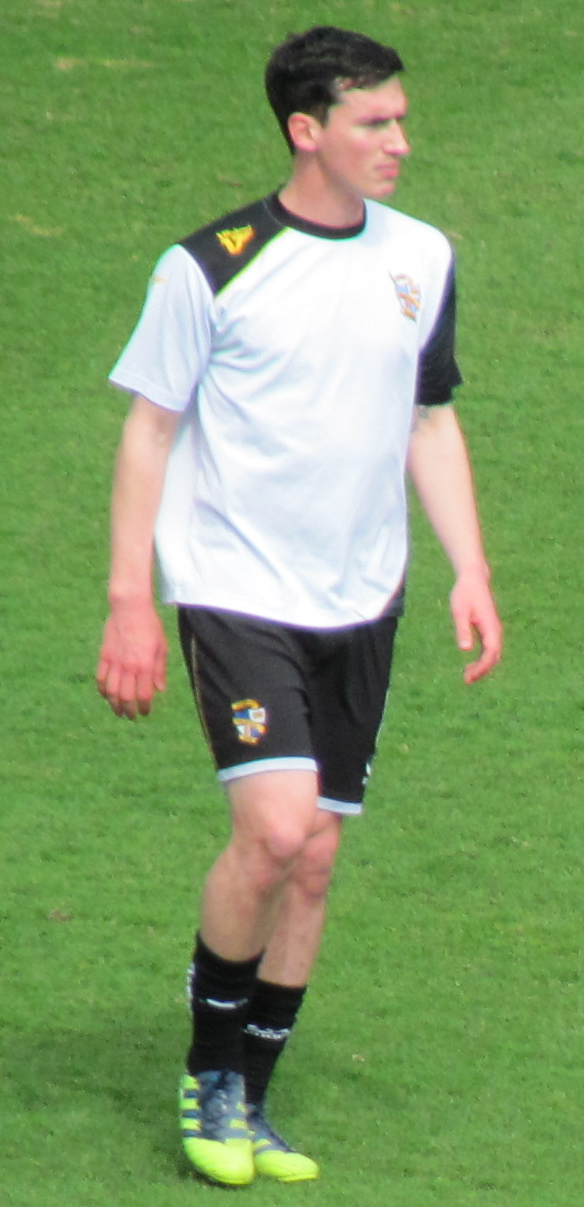
Louis Dodds scored right goals in 44 appearances.

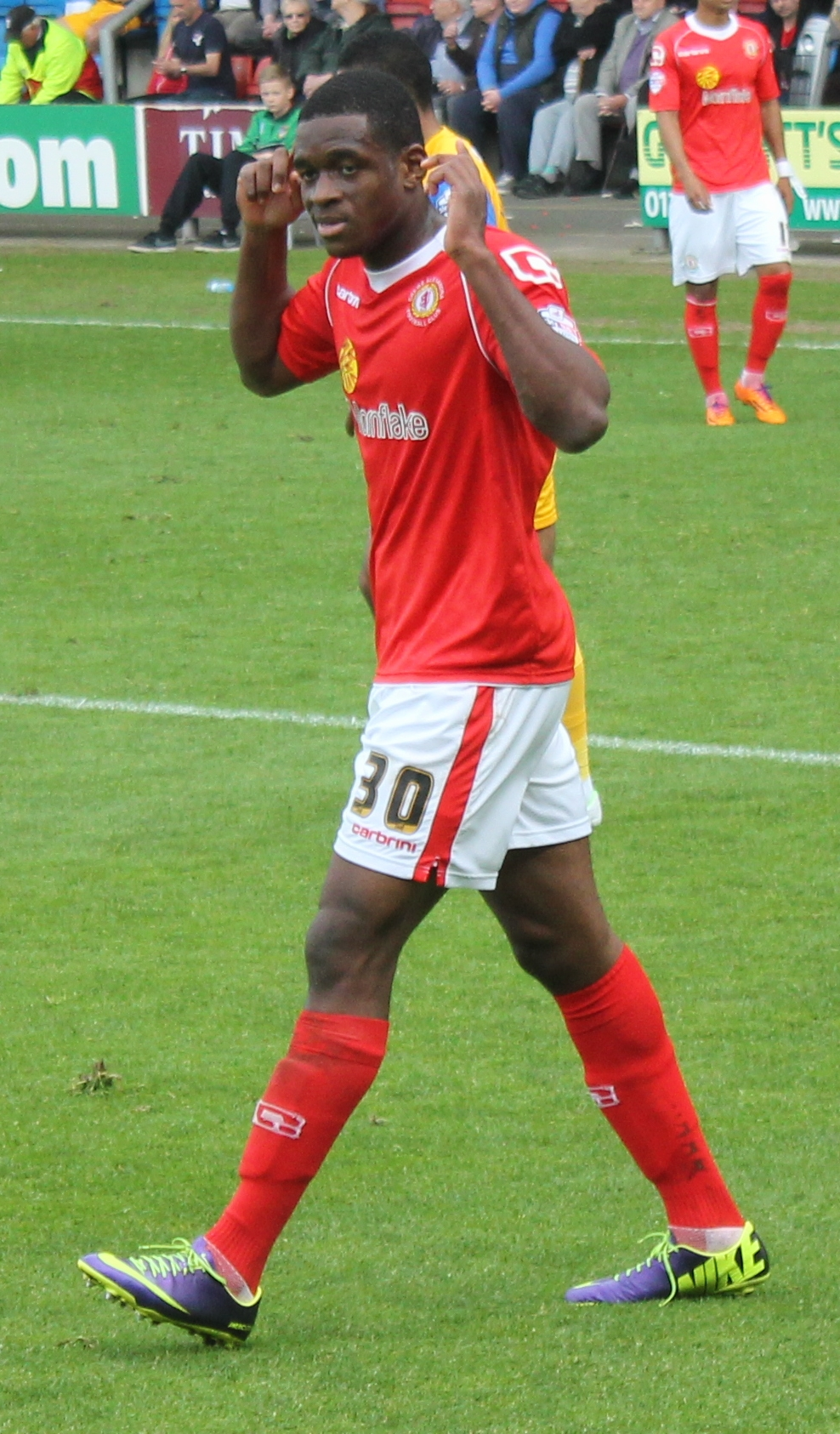
Uche Ikpeazu scored six goals during his loan spell.

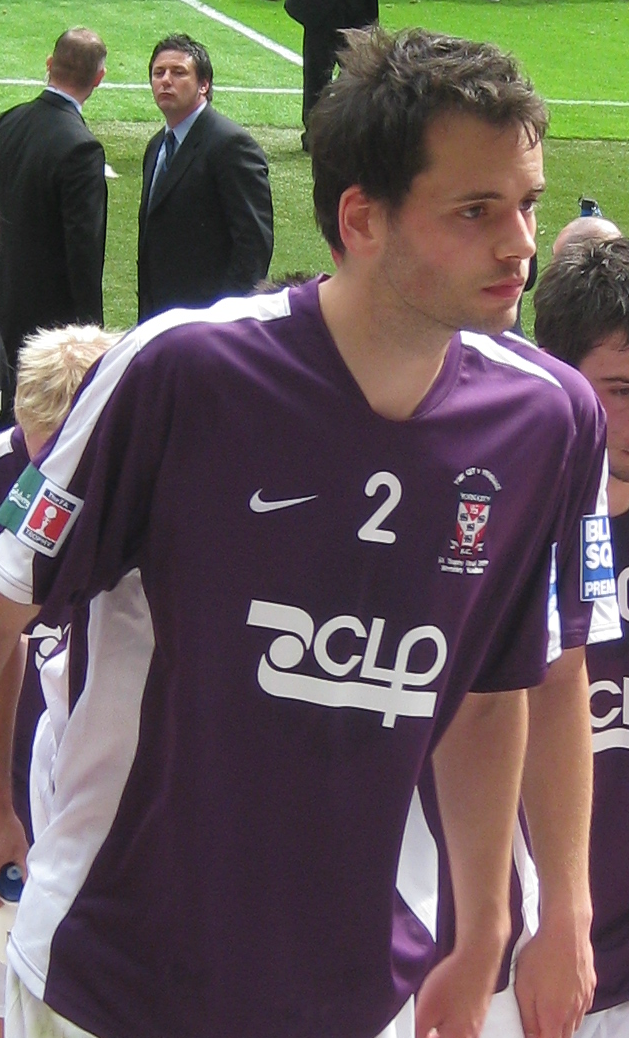
New signing Ben Purkiss proved to be a key player.

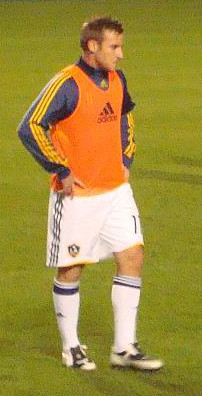
Chris Birchall had his final season in professional football.

== Overview ==
=== League One ===
Five youth team players were given professional contracts for the 2015–16 season: defender Lewis Bergin, midfielders Chekaine Steele, Billy Reeves and Omar Haughton, and striker Jonathon Kapend. Manager Rob Page signed a new two-year contract in May 2015. However, he needed to avoid a poor start to the season as chairman Norman Smurthwaite warned he was prepared to make "ruthless decisions" if the club were struggling by September. The first signings of the season were powerful former loanee defender Remie Streete from Newcastle United, and former Norwich City youth player Sam Kelly. Midfielder Sam Foley also joined the "Valiants" on a two-year contract, choosing to leave relegated Yeovil Town just after picking up Yeovil's Player of the Year award. Page further strengthened the defence and midfield by signing Walsall right-back Ben Purkiss and Crewe Alexandra defensive midfielder Anthony Grant. Page needed to find a cost-effective forward with the club both short on strikers following the departure of Tom Pope and Ben Williamson and with little funds available due to a large cut to the wage bill, and so brought in young Watford striker Uche Ikpeazu on loan, having been impressed by Ikpeazu's performances for Crewe last season. Another former Crewe favourite, A-Jay Leitch-Smith, was also signed after impressing Page during pre-season. The eighth and final summer signing was Ryan Inniss, who was confirmed as joining on a season-long loan from Crystal Palace after being linked with a return to Vale Park for many weeks. On 6 August, Vale signed goalkeeper Jak Alnwick on a short-term deal; he was signed to compete with Sam Johnson for a first-team place as Chris Neal was out injured at the start of the season.

The season opened with the derby against Crewe Alexandra at Gresty Road, and the game ended 0–0 with eight players making their debuts for Vale; Crewe boss Steve Davis admitted Vale were the better team and had man of the match goalkeeper Ben Garratt to thank for the clean sheet. Two days later a third former Newcastle United Academy graduate arrived in striker JJ Hooper, who had scored 20 goals in 29 games the previous season for Havant & Waterlooville. The unbeaten start continued with a 1–1 draw with Gillingham, Louis Dodds scoring the equalising goal to secure the point. An injury-time penalty from Sam Foley then rescued a point away at Swindon Town as Vale twice came from behind against an attractive Swindon side; the penalty was awarded in bizarre circumstances as Jordan Williams handled the ball from a corner to try and stop the game after seeing a teammate lying injured on the pitch. Vale then cruised to a comfortable 3–0 home victory over Doncaster Rovers despite Foley missing a penalty early in the game. Yet another player arrived in the form of central midfielder Jak McCourt, signed on a one-month loan from Leicester City. The unbeaten start to the season came to an end at Bradford City when Devante Cole scored the only goal of the game four minutes into stoppage time.

Vale let slip a two-goal lead over Wigan Athletic on 12 September, but Ikpeazu managed to claim all three points for Vale after Wigan's equalising goalscorer Leon Barnett was sent off for bringing down Andoh. Millwall were the next visitors to Vale Park, and like Wigan had been relegated from the Championship the previous season, but unlike Wigan managed to beat the Vale 2–0 with a professional performance. Vale then travelled to Bury and slipped to a 1–0 defeat in a poor game that was decided by a set-piece. Vale came from behind at Fleetwood Town to win 2–1 after Page substituted top-scorer Ikpeazu for Colin Daniel, who went on to score the equalising goal. The situation was reversed at home to Oldham Athletic, Ikpeazu coming off the bench to secure a point against the division's away draw specialists, though Page again bemoaned his team's habit of conceding form set pieces.

Vale put in a highly impressive performance to defeat Sheffield United 2–1 and climb to within one point of the play-off places. They failed to build on the result however, falling to a 1–0 loss at Southend United; Phil Brown said the Southend performance was the best he had seen as Southend manager. The story before the Peterborough United game was that Jak Alnwick was to line up against his elder brother Ben Alnwick, though the headlines after the game focused on Vale's penalty takers, as Michael O'Connor marked his return from injury by missing a penalty and central midfield partner Foley later missed a second penalty in the game to squander two points in what ended as a 1–1 draw. Vale then had a tough mid-week game at Colchester United, and lost 2–1 after suffering two injuries in the first half. More significantly Andoh suffered damage to his anterior cruciate ligament (ACL) and was ruled out for the rest of the season. Ikpeazu was sent off 25 minutes into Vale's trip to high-flying Burton Albion, but ironically it was only after the hosts also went down to ten men late into the game that Vale conceded two goals to lose 2–0. Vale ended a poor October with a 2–0 home victory over Shrewsbury Town.

On 14 November, Vale picked up all three points at Oakwell after a 2–1 victory over Barnsley. Less than 40 hours after their FA Cup first round victory, Vale then had a home fixture against Chesterfield on a snow covered pitch, but managed to put in a high quality performance and claim a 3–2 win. Their home game against Blackpool was the players' third game in five days, but they showed no signs of fatigue as two late goals secured a 2–0 victory. They failed to end the month unbeaten however, as they fell to a 2–1 defeat at Rochdale; after the game Page said he was "gobsmacked" by the referee's key decisions to award Rochdale a penalty when Carl Dickinson had "definitely taken the ball", to deny Vale a penalty after Ikpeazu was "absolutely poleaxed" in the penalty box, and to send Dickinson off when he "hasn't touched the lad at all and the lad goes down like he has been shot." Page was nominated for the League One Manager of the Month award.

Despite revelations off-the-pitch and a disappointing FA Cup exit, Vale kept their league form steady on 12 December with a 1–1 home draw with Scunthorpe United. However, they then came away from a trip to high-flying Walsall with a 2–0 defeat in a game that typified the team's unsuccessful negative tactics away from home. Captain Carl Dickinson defended the team's record however, stating that negative fans who booed should "shut up and get behind the team". A trip to the Ricoh Arena on boxing day to face Coventry City seemed to be heading for a goalless draw until Coventry took the lead ten minutes from full-time, leaving Page to rue his team's missed opportunities in the first half. Vale ended the year with a 1–0 home win over Bury, maintaining their excellent form at Vale Park.

A waterlogged pitch meant Vale had to wait until a trip to Blackpool on 9 January to open the year, and Vale managed to continue their good form with a hard-earned 1–0 victory, Leitch-Smith the goalscorer. Their away form remained poor however, as they were well beaten at Millwall on 17 January. The team were then booed off after surrendering a 1–0 lead over ten man Bradford to draw 1–1. Page then entered the transfer market, bringing in Jamaica international striker Theo Robinson and taking Cardiff City winger Matty Kennedy on a one-month loan (which was later extended by two months). Kennedy started the next game, as Leitch-Smith scored both of Vale's goals in a 2–1 win over Doncaster Rovers. However, Vale ended the month with a 3–0 defeat at Wigan following a first-half red card for Ryan McGivern.

Vale began February just a point outside the play-offs after recording what Page described as an "ugly" 1–0 win over Swindon. Vale then outplayed Coventry, but needed a sensational goal from Sam Kelly to win a point and a 1–1 draw. Vale then rounded off a series of three successive home games with a 0–0 draw with Fleetwood. Injury to Alnwick meant that Neal was recalled from his loan spell at Doncaster Rovers for the trip to Sheffield United, which ended in a 1–0 defeat from a Billy Sharp goal. They ended the month with an impressive 3–1 home win over Southend to remain in touch with the play-off places.

Struggling Oldham held Vale to a 1–1 draw on 1 March, having lost their slender lead to a disputed penalty. A 2–0 home win over bottom-club Colchester kept the Vale in touch with the play-offs. The season appeared to be petering out as Vale trailed by 2–0 at half-time at Peterborough, but they turned the game around completely in the second half to claim a 3–2 victory. Page praised the character of his players after revealing eight players had paid to stay in a local hotel the night before to save travelling on the day. However, the next game saw Page apologising to the fans after league leaders Burton ended Vale's 14-game unbeaten league run at home with a 4–0 win. Vale were heading for a 1–0 victory over Shrewsbury when a late error from Alnwick allowed Sullay Kaikai's long-distance strike to become an equalising goal.> A 1–0 home defeat to play-off chasing Barnsley then ended any realistic hopes of a play-off place for the Vale.

On 2 April, Port Vale collapsed away at Chesterfield, losing a convincing 1–0 half-time lead to lose 4–2; Page described the performance as "embarrassing" and "not acceptable". Seven days later, Vale went on to relegate nearby Crewe Alexandra with a comfortable 3–0 home victory, Dodds scoring a brace and Hooper claiming one goal. Vale went on to record a 2–0 win at sixth-place Gillingham using a 3–5–2 formation with McGivern, Streete, and Richard Duffy operating as central defenders. The winning run continued with a comfortable 4–1 victory over Rochdale, before coming to an end with a 1–0 defeat at Scunthorpe. Walsall inflicted a heavy 5–0 on Vale on the final game of the season.

Page offered new contracts to 13 out-of-contract players, and opted to release nine players: Lewis Bergin, Achille Campion, Colin Daniel, Omar Haughton (who was later re-signed after Page departed), Jonathon Kapend, Ryan McGivern, Chris Neal, Chekaine Steele, and Theo Robinson. However, Page himself would not stay to see any of these contracts signed, as he left the club to take charge at newly-promoted Northampton Town. The first player to leave the club after rejecting a contract was Louis Dodds, who joined league rivals Shrewsbury Town. He was quickly followed by Richard Duffy, who dropped down two divisions to join National League club Eastleigh. Star midfielder Michael O'Connor, top-scorer A-Jay Leitch-Smith, and club captain Carl Dickinson also confirmed that they would be leaving the club after rejecting the club's new contract offer. The last to leave was Enoch Andoh, who could not agree terms with the club despite protracted negotiations.

=== Finances & ownership issues ===
Chairman Norman Smurthwaite stated that due to falling gate figures the club's wage bill would be cut for the 2015–16 season, meaning a severely reduced contract offer for star striker Tom Pope, who chose to leave the club. In a statement released in March 2017, Smurthwaite stated that on 10 November 2015 he was approached by an American hedge fund consortium who were looking to buy the club. He further stated that a local business also approached the club secretary to purchase the club behind Smurthwaite's back. Following the club's FA Cup exit Smurthwaite officially put the club up for sale, saying that he felt "humiliated, ashamed and embarrassed" after witnessing the team's performance. He set an asking price of £4.25 million, stating "I have never lost money on a transaction in my adult life and I am not starting now". He also stated that plans to sign a striker in the January transfer window would be scrapped. He continued to reveal that he had been physically assaulted by three Vale supporters in April 2014, though Staffordshire Police could find no record of Smurthwaite's complaint. He also admitted that he had been planning on buying Torquay United before being told by the Football League that he would not be allowed to own two clubs. He further claimed that he had considered appointing Jimmy Floyd Hasselbaink as manager in September 2014, but decided against it partly because he believed that a racist minority of the club's supporters would make appointing a black manager a bad idea.

"I just feel I have let the club down because I have tried to do everything myself which meant cut costs to put every available penny on to the pitch. Clearly that must be wrong because yesterday if the players had put the same amount of effort into playing as I do into paying them every month we would have knocked that club for six."

— Smurthwaite became disillusioned with the club following the FA Cup defeat.

Smurthwaite signed an exclusivity deal with a local company in February 2016. He said that if the club were not sold than next season's budget would be slashed by £800,000 and the playing squad would be reduced; Page said that Smurthwaite's comments were "unwelcome". Ben Purkiss admitted that Smurthwaite's threat to cut player's wages by 40% had a destabilising effect on the squad. The exclusivity agreement ended in early March, with the club back on general sale. Smurthwaite said this was because the company had significantly reduced their offer and admitted that they needed to find further finances to conclude the deal. A consortium from Boston, USA then signed an exclusivity deal on 14 March. Smurthwaite ended the negotiations after finding that the investors had no working capital. Port Vale owed Norman Smurthwaite £3 million as a director's loan at the end of June 2016.

=== Cup competitions ===
Vale's first opponents in the FA Cup were Maidenhead United of the National League South, who came back from Byron Moore's first half opener to bring about a replay after a stoppage time equaliser. An upset seemed on the cards in the replay when Maidenhead took the lead, but Vale gradually took control of the game and A-Jay Leitch-Smith scored a brace in an eventual 3–1 victory. Smurthwaite was rumoured to have planned to sack Page live on BT Sport if the club lost the game, though he dismissed the rumour as untrue. A trip to mid-table League Two side Exeter City awaited in the second Round, and an all-round "hugely disappointing performance" resulted in a 2–0 defeat. After the game Smurthwaite and Page had a heated confrontation on the pitch, leading to speculation on the manager's future. Had Vale beaten Exeter then they would have had a lucrative home tie with Liverpool in the third round.

In the League Cup first round, Vale hosted Burnley, who had been relegated from the Premier League the previous season; Byron Moore scored the only goal of the game on 82 minutes. The second round draw took them to Premier League side West Bromwich Albion, and Vale held Tony Pulis's side to a 0–0 draw until the end of extra time before losing the penalty shoot-out.

Vale hosted League Two side Carlisle United in the first round of the Football League Trophy, and Page named the strongest side at his disposal whilst "Blues" boss Keith Curle left top-scorer Jabo Ibehre on the bench; Uche Ikpeazu scored the only goal of the game as a Vale booked their place in the second round. Despite naming a strong team at home to struggling Blackpool, who made eight changes, Page was angered with the team for their performance as they crashed out at the Second round with a 2–1 defeat.

== Results ==
=== Pre-season ===
11 July 2015 Friendly	Newcastle Town	0–3	Port Vale	Newcastle-under-Lyme
14:30 BST		Report	Daniel 17'; Brown 28'; Campion 79'	Stadium: Lyme Valley Stadium; Attendance: 1,612

14 July 2015 Friendly	Alsager Town	2–5	Port Vale	Alsager
19:30 BST	Hill; Johnson 43'	Report	Moore; O'Connor 60' (pen.); Andoh 68'; Daniel 70'; Campion 82'	Stadium: Wood Park Stadium

15 July 2015 Friendly	Kidsgrove Athletic	0–5	Port Vale	Kidsgrove
19:30 BST		Report	Daniel 10'; McGivern 18'; Birchall 46'; Leitch-Smith 73', 83'	Stadium: The Novus Stadium; Attendance: 818

21 July 2015 Friendly	Port Vale	2–1	Notts County	Burslem
19:30 BST	Dickinson 68'; Dodds 72'	Report	Stead 58'	Stadium: Vale Park; Attendance: 768

25 July 2015 Friendly	Port Vale	2–2	Getafe (Spain)	Burslem
15:00 BST	Leitch-Smith 6', 45'	Report	Wanderson Campos 8'; Villameuela 69'	Stadium: Vale Park; Attendance: 1,652

28 July 2015 Friendly	Port Vale	1–2	Bolton Wanderers	Burslem
19:30 BST	Foley 69'	Report	Madine 39', 59'	Stadium: Vale Park; Attendance: 1,288

1 August 2015 Friendly	Altrincham	1–2	Port Vale	Altrincham
15:00 BST	Reeves	Report	Daniel 28'; Ikpeazu 39'	Stadium: Moss Lane; Attendance: 494

=== Football League One ===
==== League table ====
Pos	Team	Pld	W	D	L	GF	GA	GD	Pts
10	Rochdale	46	19	12	15	68	61	+7	69
11	Sheffield United	46	18	12	16	64	59	+5	66
12	Port Vale	46	18	11	17	56	58	−2	65
13	Peterborough United	46	19	6	21	82	73	+9	63
14	Southend United	46	16	11	19	58	64	−6	59

Updated to match(es) played on 1 July 2016. Source: BBC Sport
Rules for classification: 1) Points; 2) Goal difference; 3) Number of goals scored

==== Results by matchday ====
Round	1	2	3	4	5	6	7	8	9	10	11	12	13	14	15	16	17	18	19	20	21	22	23	24	25	26	27	28	29	30	31	32	33	34	35	36	37	38	39	40	41	42	43	44	45	46
Ground	A	H	A	H	A	H	H	A	A	H	H	A	H	A	A	H	A	H	H	A	H	A	A	H	A	A	H	A	A	H	H	H	A	H	A	H	A	H	A	H	A	H	A	H	A	H
Result	D	D	D	W	L	W	L	L	W	D	W	L	D	L	L	W	W	W	W	L	D	L	L	W	W	L	D	W	L	W	D	D	L	W	D	W	W	L	D	L	L	W	W	W	L	L
Position	17	15	13	11	13	12	14	15	12	13	8	11	11	16	17	15	13	12	10	11	11	13	13	11	10	11	11	10	10	8	9	9	11	10	10	9	9	10	10	11	13	12	11	11	12	12
Points	1	2	3	6	6	9	9	9	12	13	16	16	17	17	17	20	23	26	29	29	30	30	30	33	36	36	37	40	40	43	44	45	45	48	49	52	55	55	56	56	56	59	62	65	65	65

Source: Statto
A = Away; H = Home; W = Win; D = Draw; L = Loss

==== Matches ====
8 August 2015 1	Crewe Alexandra	0–0	Port Vale	Crewe
15:00 BST		Report		Stadium: Gresty Road; Attendance: 6,751; Referee: Dean Whitestone; Assistant referees: Thomas Bramall, Ken Haycock; Fourth official: Simon Mather

15 August 2015 2	Port Vale	1–1	Gillingham	Burslem
15:00 BST	Dodds 35'	Report	Dack 17'	Stadium: Vale Park; Attendance: 5,067; Referee: Fred Graham; Assistant referees: Dumitru-Ravel Cheosiaua, Nicholas Hopton; Fourth official: Kevin Mattocks

18 August 2015 3	Swindon Town	2–2	Port Vale	Swindon
19:45 BST	Robert 12'; Rodgers 66'	Report	Ikpeazu 21'; Foley 90+6' (pen.)	Stadium: County Ground; Attendance: 7,026; Referee: Brendan Malone; Assistant referees: Mark Pottage, Craig Hicks; Fourth official: John O'Brien

22 August 2015 4	Port Vale	3–0	Doncaster Rovers	Burslem
15:00 BST	Foley 35'; Ikpeazu 46'; Moore 88'	Report		Stadium: Vale Park; Attendance: 4,775; Referee: Robert Lewis; Assistant referees: Peter Gooch, Michael Hanley; Fourth official: Mark Griffiths

29 August 2015 5	Bradford City	1–0	Port Vale	Bradford
15:00 BST	Cole 90+4'	Report		Stadium: Valley Parade; Attendance: 17,806; Referee: Jeremy Simpson; Assistant referees: Ian Smedley, Marvyn Amphlett; Fourth official: Barry Cropp

12 September 2015 6	Port Vale	3–2	Wigan Athletic	Burslem
15:00 BST	Grant 34'; Dodds 64'; Ikpeazu 90'	Report	McCann 66'; Barnett 83'	Stadium: Vale Park; Attendance: 5,953; Referee: Mark Haywood; Assistant referees: Thomas Kirk, James Bell; Fourth official: Gareth Mellor

15 September 2015 7	Port Vale	0–2	Millwall	Burslem
19:45 BST		Report	Beevers 66'; Gregory 90+2' (pen.)	Stadium: Vale Park; Attendance: 4,477; Referee: Oliver Langford; Assistant referees: Wayne Barratt, Christopher Ward; Fourth official: Paul Graham

19 September 2015 8	Bury	1–0	Port Vale	Bury
15:00 BST	Cameron 78'	Report		Stadium: Gigg Lane; Attendance: 4,323; Referee: Darren Drysdale; Assistant referees: Tom Nield, Craig Taylor; Fourth official: David Benton

26 September 2015 9	Fleetwood Town	1–2	Port Vale	Fleetwood
15:00 BST	Grant 14'	Report	Daniel 56'; Foley 65' (pen.)	Stadium: Highbury Stadium; Attendance: 3,560; Referee: Seb Stockbridge; Assistant referees: Billy Khatib, Joe Simpson; Fourth official: Paul Marsden

29 September 2015 10	Port Vale	1–1	Oldham Athletic	Burslem
19:45 BST	Ikpeazu 70'	Report	Higdon 35'	Stadium: Vale Park; Attendance: 4,065; Referee: Kevin Johnson; Assistant referees: Joe Clark, Declan Bourne; Fourth official: John Law

3 October 2015 11	Port Vale	2–1	Sheffield United	Burslem
15:00 BST	Moore 17'; Ikpeazu 45'	Report	Done 90+5'	Stadium: Vale Park; Attendance: 6,822; Referee: Graham Salisbury; Assistant referees: Stephen Ross, Andy Hendley; Fourth official: Nigel Smith

10 October 2015 12	Southend United	1–0	Port Vale	Southend-on-Sea
15:00 BST	Pigott 63'	Report		Stadium: Roots Hall; Attendance: 6,543; Referee: Iain Williamson; Assistant referees: Adam Crysell, Paul Howard; Fourth official: Nicholas Cooper

17 October 2015 13	Port Vale	1–1	Peterborough United	Burslem
15:00 BST	Andoh 40'	Report	Bostwick 56' (pen.)	Stadium: Vale Park; Attendance: 4,864; Referee: Richard Clark; Assistant referees: Chris Isherwood, Timothy Wood; Fourth official: Steven Meredith

20 October 2015 14	Colchester United	2–1	Port Vale	Colchester
19:45 BST	Elokobi 25'; Sordell 73'	Report	Daniel 45'	Stadium: Colchester Community Stadium; Attendance: 2,785; Referee: Darren Deadman; Assistant referees: Dave Bushell, Ashvin Degnarain; Fourth official: Darren Cann

24 October 2015 15	Burton Albion	2–0	Port Vale	Burton upon Trent
15:00 BST	Naylor 84'; El Khayati 90'	Report		Stadium: Pirelli Stadium; Attendance: 4,076; Referee: David Coote; Assistant referees: Robert Atkin, Barry Cropp; Fourth official: Craig Taylor

31 October 2015 16	Port Vale	2–0	Shrewsbury Town	Burslem
15:00 GMT	Dodds 52'; O'Connor 80' (pen.)	Report		Stadium: Vale Park; Attendance: 4,880; Referee: Darren Handley; Assistant referees: Richard Wigglesworth, Mark Griffiths; Fourth official: Akil Howson

14 November 2015 17	Barnsley	1–2	Port Vale	Barnsley
15:00 GMT	Winnall 77'	Report	Leitch-Smith 40'; Foley 47'	Stadium: Oakwell; Attendance: 8,696; Referee: Tony Harrington; Assistant referees: Wayne Grunnill, Stuart Eagland; Fourth official: Peter Gooch

21 November 2015 18	Port Vale	3–2	Chesterfield	Burslem
15:00 GMT	Kelly 6'; Leitch-Smith 10'; Dodds 48'	Report	Simons 8'; Novak 90'	Stadium: Vale Park; Attendance: 4,420; Referee: Michael Bull; Assistant referees: Ian Dudley, Joseph Johnson; Fourth official: Matthew Parry

24 November 2015 19	Port Vale	2–0	Blackpool	Burslem
19:45 GMT	Leitch-Smith 82'; Birchall 86'	Report		Stadium: Vale Park; Attendance: 3,640; Referee: David Webb; Assistant referees: Mark Duncan, Matt Donohue; Fourth official: John Law

28 November 2015 20	Rochdale	2–1	Port Vale	Rochdale
15:00 GMT	Henderson 40' (pen.); Mendez-Laing 78'	Report	Birchall 13'	Stadium: Spotland Stadium; Attendance: 2,510; Referee: Darren England; Assistant referees: Barry Gordon, Andrew Miller; Fourth official: Danny Gratton

12 December 2015 21	Port Vale	1–1	Scunthorpe United	Burslem
15:00 GMT	Leitch-Smith 45+2'	Report	King 36'	Stadium: Vale Park; Attendance: 3,983; Referee: Lee Collins; Assistant referees: Kevin Mattocks, James Wilson; Fourth official: Philip Dermott

20 December 2015 22	Walsall	2–0	Port Vale	Walsall
12:00 GMT	Cook 64', 83'	Report		Stadium: Bescot Stadium; Referee: Kevin Wright; Assistant referees: Mark Howes, Nicholas Hopton; Fourth official: David Coote

26 December 2015 23	Coventry City	1–0	Port Vale	Coventry
15:00 GMT	Maddison 80'	Report		Stadium: Ricoh Arena; Attendance: 17,779; Referee: Robert Lewis; Assistant referees: Barry Cropp, Stuart Eagland; Fourth official: Ian Smedley

28 December 2015 24	Port Vale	1–0	Bury	Burslem
15:00 GMT	Kelly 57'	Report		Stadium: Vale Park; Attendance: 5,467; Referee: James Adcock; Assistant referees: Neil Davies, Paul Hodskinson; Fourth official: David Plowright

9 January 2016 25	Blackpool	0–1	Port Vale	Blackpool
15:00 GMT		Report	Leitch-Smith 49'	Stadium: Bloomfield Road; Attendance: 6,527; Referee: Seb Stockbridge; Assistant referees: Paul Graham, Kevin Mulraine; Fourth official: Darren Strain

17 January 2016 26	Millwall	3–1	Port Vale	New Cross
15:00 GMT	Gregory 14', 34'; Morison 44'	Report	Hooper 61'	Stadium: The Den; Attendance: 7,773; Referee: Andy Davies; Assistant referees: Alan Young, Lee Venamore; Fourth official: Stuart Butler

23 January 2016 27	Port Vale	1–1	Bradford City	Burslem
15:00 GMT	Leitch-Smith 2'	Report	Proctor 65'	Stadium: Vale Park; Attendance: 4,849; Referee: Lee Swabey; Assistant referees: Thomas Bramall, Thomas Kirk; Fourth official: Mark Griffiths

26 January 2016 28	Doncaster Rovers	1–2	Port Vale	Doncaster
19:45 GMT	Evina 88'	Report	Leitch-Smith 6', 65'	Stadium: Keepmoat Stadium; Attendance: 4,799; Referee: Geoff Eltringham; Assistant referees: Matthew Dicicco, Danny Gratton

30 January 2016 29	Wigan Athletic	3–0	Port Vale	Wigan
15:00 GMT	Duffy 7' (og.); Grigg 41' (pen.), 69'	Report		Stadium: DW Stadium; Attendance: 9,627; Referee: Darren Drysdale; Assistant referees: Scott Oldham, Joe Simpson; Fourth official: Ricky Wootton

2 February 2016 30	Port Vale	1–0	Swindon Town	Burslem
19:45 GMT	Dickinson 6'	Report		Stadium: Vale Park; Attendance: 3,256; Referee: Peter Bankes; Assistant referees: Nicholas Barnard, Anthony Moore; Fourth official: Paul Thompson

7 February 2016 31	Port Vale	1–1	Coventry City	Burslem
14:00 GMT	Kelly 84'	Report	Murphy 42'	Stadium: Vale Park; Attendance: 6,320; Referee: Phil Gibbs; Assistant referees: James Mainwaring, Brian Durie; Fourth official: Matt Eva

13 February 2016 32	Port Vale	0–0	Fleetwood Town	Burslem
15:00 GMT		Report		Stadium: Vale Park; Attendance: 4,194; Referee: Charles Breakspear; Assistant referees: Andy Newbold, Neil Radford; Fourth official: James Bell

20 February 2016 33	Sheffield United	1–0	Port Vale	Sheffield
15:00 GMT	Sharp 50'	Report		Stadium: Bramall Lane; Attendance: 18,276; Referee: Ben Toner; Assistant referees: Dumitru-Ravel Cheosiaua, Bob Roberts; Fourth official: Michael Denton

26 February 2016 34	Port Vale	3–1	Southend United	Burslem
19:45 GMT	Dickinson 18'; O'Connor 38'; Coker 40' (og.)	Report	McQueen 90+3'	Stadium: Vale Park; Attendance: 3,957; Referee: Andy Haines; Assistant referees: Mark Jones, Chris Isherwood; Fourth official: David Benton

1 March 2016 35	Oldham Athletic	1–1	Port Vale	Oldham
19:45 GMT	Kelly 68'	Report	Foley 60'	Stadium: Boundary Park; Attendance: 3,507; Referee: Darren Handley; Assistant referees: Peter Gibbons, Michael D'Aguilar; Fourth official: Nicholas Hopton

5 March 2016 36	Port Vale	2–0	Colchester United	Burslem
15:00 GMT	Robinson 9'; Foley 73'	Report		Stadium: Vale Park; Attendance: 4,116; Referee: Jeremy Simpson; Assistant referees: Ryan Johnson, Mark Dwyer; Fourth official: Gary Hilton

12 March 2016 37	Peterborough United	2–3	Port Vale	Peterborough
15:00 GMT	Taylor 2'; Williams 41'	Report	Moore 49'; Hooper 86'; Dodds 89'	Stadium: London Road Stadium; Attendance: 4,942; Referee: Darren Bond; Assistant referees: Ian Dudley, Nick Hobbis; Fourth official: Ian Smedley

19 March 2016 38	Port Vale	0–4	Burton Albion	Burslem
15:00 GMT		Report	Akins 34'; Grant 45+1' (og.); Duffy 50'; Butcher 60'	Stadium: Vale Park; Attendance: 6,157; Referee: Eddie Ilderton; Assistant referees: Alan Clayton, David Plowright; Fourth official: Kevin Mattocks

25 March 2016 39	Shrewsbury Town	1–1	Port Vale	Shrewsbury
15:00 GMT	Kaikai 73'	Report	Dodds 60'	Stadium: New Meadow; Attendance: 7,019; Referee: Mark Heywood; Assistant referees: Anthony Tankard, Nigel Smith; Fourth official: James Adcock

28 March 2016 40	Port Vale	0–1	Barnsley	Burslem
15:00 BST		Report	Hourihane 9'	Stadium: Vale Park; Attendance: 4,839; Referee: Scott Duncan; Assistant referees: Joe Clark, Peter Gooch; Fourth official: Paul Tierney

2 April 2016 41	Chesterfield	4–2	Port Vale	Chesterfield
15:00 BST	Campbell-Ryce 47'; Hird 60'; Ariyibi 73'; O'Shea 83'	Report	Leitch-Smith 36'; Hooper 70'	Stadium: Proact Stadium; Attendance: 5,917; Referee: Kevin Wright; Assistant referees: Marvyn Amphlett, Karl Evans; Fourth official: Declan Bourne

9 April 2016 42	Port Vale	3–0	Crewe Alexandra	Burslem
15:00 BST	Dodds 3', 83'; Hooper 90+2'	Report		Stadium: Vale Park; Attendance: 5,771; Referee: Paul Tierney; Assistant referees: Michael Denton, Bob Roberts; Fourth official: Paul Graham

16 April 2016 43	Gillingham	0–2	Port Vale	Gillingham, Kent
15:00 BST		Report	Leitch-Smith 19'; Dickinson 21'	Stadium: Priestfield Stadium; Attendance: 5,887; Referee: Ross Joyce; Assistant referees: Dan Robathan, Christopher O'Donnell; Fourth official: Graham Kane

23 April 2016 44	Port Vale	4–1	Rochdale	Burslem
15:00 BST	Robinson 37'; O'Connor 45' (pen.), 76' (pen.); Hooper 46'	Report	Andrew 50'	Stadium: Vale Park; Attendance: 4,380; Referee: Nick Kinseley; Assistant referees: Akil Howson, Paul Hobday; Fourth official: Rob Ellis

30 April 2016 45	Scunthorpe United	1–0	Port Vale	Scunthorpe
15:00 BST	Madden 61'	Report		Stadium: Glanford Park; Attendance: 7,275; Referee: Ben Toner; Assistant referees: Ian Dudley, Nigel Smith; Fourth official: Wayne Grunnill

8 May 2016 46	Port Vale	0–5	Walsall	Burslem
15:00 BST		Report	Downing 23'; Bradshaw 26'; Forde 38', 67'; Mantom 71'	Stadium: Vale Park; Attendance: 8,595; Referee: Nigel Miller; Assistant referees: Timothy Wood, Paul Marsden; Fourth official: James Bell

=== FA Cup ===
8 November 2015 R1	Port Vale	1–1	Maidenhead United	Burslem
15:00	Moore 31'	Report	Mulley 90+4'	Stadium: Vale Park; Attendance: 3,977; Referee: Adrian Holmes; Assistant referees: Ken Haycock, Matthew Bristow; Fourth official: Paul Graham

19 November 2015 Replay	Maidenhead United	1–3	Port Vale	Maidenhead
19:45	Massey 15'	Report	O'Connor 35'; Leitch-Smith 49', 57'	Stadium: York Road; Attendance: 2,212; Referee: Dean Whitestone; Assistant referees: David Avent, Justin Amey; Fourth official: Nick Kinseley

6 December 2015 R2	Exeter City	2–0	Port Vale	Exeter
14:00	Tillson 19'; Watkins 89'	Report		Stadium: St James Park; Attendance: 3,565; Referee: Trevor Kettle; Assistant referees: Adam Matthews, Ron Ganfield; Fourth official: Adam Bromley

=== League Cup ===
10 August 2015 R1	Port Vale	1–0	Burnley	Burslem
19:45 BST	Moore 82'	Report		Stadium: Vale Park; Attendance: 4,634; Referee: Trevor Kettle; Assistant referees: Darren Strain, Michael Denton; Fourth official: Kevin Morris

25 August 2015 R2	West Bromwich Albion	0–0 (a.e.t.) (5–3 p)	Port Vale	West Bromwich
20:00 BST		Report		Stadium: The Hawthorns; Attendance: 13,915; Referee: Keith Stroud; Assistant referees: Guy Stretton, Mathew Buonassisi; Fourth official: Trevor Kettle
	Penalties
	Lambert (penalty scored); Yacob (penalty scored); McManaman (penalty scored); McClean (penalty scored); Chester (penalty scored)		Leitch-Smith (penalty scored); Duffy (penalty missed); Purkiss (penalty scored); Foley (penalty scored)

=== Football League Trophy ===
1 September 2015 R1	Port Vale	1–0	Carlisle United	Burslem
19:45 BST	Ikpeazu 60'	Report		Stadium: Vale Park; Attendance: 2,571; Referee: Darren England; Assistant referees: David Plowright, James Mainwaring; Fourth official: Amy Fearn

6 October 2015 R2	Port Vale	1–2	Blackpool	Burslem
19:45 BST	Grant 52' (pen.)	Report	Rivers 44'; Robertson 56'	Stadium: Vale Park; Attendance: 2,720; Referee: Mark Heywood; Assistant referees: Simon Barrow, Ryan Johnson; Fourth official: Alan Clayton

== Squad statistics ==
=== Appearances and goals ===
Key to positions: GK – Goalkeeper; DF – Defender; MF – Midfielder; FW – Forward

No.	Pos	Nat	Player	Total		League One		FA Cup		League Cup		Football League Trophy	
No.	Pos	Nat	Player	Apps	Goals	Apps	Goals	Apps	Goals	Apps	Goals	Apps	Goals
1	GK	(England) ENG	Chris Neal	6	0	6	0	0	0	0	0	0	0
2	DF	(England) ENG	Ben Purkiss	45	0	39	0	2	0	2	0	2	0
3	DF	(England) ENG	Carl Dickinson	50	3	44	3	2	0	2	0	2	0
4	DF	(England) ENG	Remie Streete	18	0	13	0	2	0	1	0	2	0
5	DF	(Northern Ireland) NIR	Ryan McGivern	32	0	28	0	3	0	0	0	1	0
6	DF	(Wales) WAL	Richard Duffy	52	0	45	0	3	0	2	0	2	0
7	MF	(Trinidad and Tobago) TTO	Chris Birchall	12	2	10	2	1	0	0	0	1	0
8	MF	(Northern Ireland) NIR	Michael O'Connor	29	5	26	4	3	1	0	0	0	0
10	FW	(England) ENG	Louis Dodds	44	8	37	8	3	0	2	0	2	0
11	MF	(Republic of Ireland) IRL	Sam Foley	50	6	45	6	3	0	2	0	0	0
12	GK	(England) ENG	Sam Johnson	0	0	0	0	0	0	0	0	0	0
14	MF	(England) ENG	Colin Daniel	25	2	20	2	2	0	1	0	2	0
15	FW	(England) ENG	JJ Hooper	30	5	28	5	1	0	0	0	1	0
16	DF	(England) ENG	Adam Yates	12	0	11	0	1	0	0	0	0	0
17	MF	(England) ENG	Michael Brown	14	0	13	0	0	0	0	0	1	0
18	MF	(Republic of Ireland) IRL	Sam Kelly	31	3	28	3	1	0	2	0	0	0
19	MF	(England) ENG	Byron Moore	41	5	36	3	2	1	2	1	1	0
20	FW	(England) ENG	A-Jay Leitch-Smith	43	12	37	10	3	2	2	0	1	0
21	GK	(England) ENG	Jak Alnwick	48	0	41	0	3	0	2	0	2	0
22	MF	(England) ENG	Ryan Lloyd	5	0	5	0	0	0	0	0	0	0
23	GK	(England) ENG	Ryan Boot	0	0	0	0	0	0	0	0	0	0
24	DF	(England) ENG	Nathan Smith	0	0	0	0	0	0	0	0	0	0
25	FW	(Jamaica) JAM	Theo Robinson	14	2	14	2	0	0	0	0	0	0
26	DF	(England) ENG	Ryan Inniss	17	0	15	0	0	0	2	0	0	0
27	MF	(Ghana) GHA	Enoch Andoh	16	1	12	1	0	0	2	0	2	0
28	FW	(France) FRA	Achille Campion	0	0	0	0	0	0	0	0	0	0
30	FW	(England) ENG	Dan Turner	1	0	1	0	0	0	0	0	0	0
31	MF	(Wales) WAL	Billy Reeves	0	0	0	0	0	0	0	0	0	0
32	DF	(England) ENG	Lewis Bergin	0	0	0	0	0	0	0	0	0	0
33	MF	(England) ENG	Chekaine Steele	0	0	0	0	0	0	0	0	0	0
34	FW	(England) ENG	Jonny Kapend	0	0	0	0	0	0	0	0	0	0
35	MF	(England) ENG	Omar Haughton	0	0	0	0	0	0	0	0	0	0
42	MF	(Jamaica) JAM	Anthony Grant	45	2	38	1	3	0	2	0	2	1
Players who featured but departed the club during the season:
9	FW	(Uganda) UGA	Uche Ikpeazu	28	6	21	5	3	0	2	0	2	1
9	MF	(Northern Ireland) NIR	Matty Kennedy	12	0	12	0	0	0	0	0	0	0
25	MF	(England) ENG	Jak McCourt	3	0	2	0	0	0	0	0	1	0
38	DF	(Sierra Leone) SLE	Aziz Deen-Conteh	0	0	0	0	0	0	0	0	0	0

=== Top scorers ===
Place	Position	Nation	Number	Name	League One	FA Cup	League Cup	Football League Trophy	Total
1	FW	England	20	A-Jay Leitch-Smith	10	2	0	0	12
2	FW	England	10	Louis Dodds	8	0	0	0	8
3	MF	Ireland	11	Sam Foley	6	0	0	0	6
–	FW	Uganda	9	Uche Ikpeazu	5	0	0	1	6
5	MF	England	15	JJ Hooper	5	0	0	0	5
–	MF	England	19	Byron Moore	3	1	1	0	5
–	MF	Northern Ireland	8	Michael O'Connor	4	1	0	0	5
8	MF	England	3	Carl Dickinson	3	0	0	0	3
–	MF	Ireland	18	Sam Kelly	3	0	0	0	3
10	MF	Trinidad	7	Chris Birchall	2	0	0	0	2
–	MF	England	14	Colin Daniel	2	0	0	0	2
–	MF	Jamaica	42	Anthony Grant	1	0	0	1	2
–	FW	Jamaica	25	Theo Robinson	2	0	0	0	2
14	MF	Ghana	27	Enoch Andoh	1	0	0	0	1
–		–	–	Own goals	1	0	0	0	1
				TOTALS	56	4	1	2	63

=== Disciplinary record ===
Number	Nation	Position	Name	League One		FA Cup		League Cup		League Trophy		Total	
Number	Nation	Position	Name	Yellow card	Red card	Yellow card	Red card	Yellow card	Red card	Yellow card	Red card	Yellow card	Red card
3	England	DF	Carl Dickinson	4	1	1	0	0	0	0	0	5	1
9	Uganda	FW	Uche Ikpeazu	3	1	0	0	2	0	0	0	5	1
5	Northern Ireland	DF	Ryan McGivern	4	1	0	0	0	0	0	0	4	1
42	Jamaica	MF	Anthony Grant	13	0	1	0	1	0	0	0	15	0
6	Wales	DF	Richard Duffy	11	0	1	0	1	0	1	0	14	0
11	Ireland	MF	Sam Foley	6	0	0	0	1	0	0	0	7	0
8	Northern Ireland	MF	Michael O'Connor	5	0	1	0	0	0	0	0	6	0
21	England	GK	Jak Alnwick	3	0	0	0	1	0	0	0	4	0
18	Ireland	MF	Sam Kelly	4	0	0	0	0	0	0	0	4	0
2	England	DF	Ben Purkiss	4	0	0	0	0	0	0	0	4	0
4	England	DF	Remie Streete	2	0	0	0	1	0	1	0	4	0
14	England	MF	Colin Daniel	3	0	0	0	0	0	0	0	3	0
26	England	DF	Ryan Inniss	3	0	0	0	0	0	0	0	3	0
9	Northern Ireland	MF	Matty Kennedy	2	0	0	0	0	0	0	0	2	0
7	Trinidad	MF	Chris Birchall	0	0	1	0	0	0	0	0	1	0
17	England	MF	Michael Brown	1	0	0	0	0	0	0	0	1	0
15	England	FW	JJ Hooper	0	0	0	0	0	0	1	0	1	0
20	England	FW	A-Jay Leitch-Smith	1	0	0	0	0	0	0	0	1	0
25	England	MF	Jak McCourt	1	0	0	0	0	0	0	0	1	0
19	England	MF	Byron Moore	1	0	0	0	0	0	0	0	1	0
			TOTALS	71	3	5	0	7	0	3	0	86	3

Sourced from Soccerway.

== Awards ==
End of Season Awards	Winner
Player of the Year	Anthony Grant
Away Travel Player of the Year	Louis Dodds
Supporters' Club's Trophy	Anthony Grant
Players' Player of the Year	Anthony Grant
Young Player of the Year	Jak Alnwick
Youth Player of the Year	Dan Turner
Goal of the Season	Sam Kelly (vs Coventry City, 7 February 2016)

== Transfers ==
=== Transfers in ===
Date from	Position	Nationality	Name	From	Fee	Ref.
1 July 2015 (Note: The transfer was announced on 18 June and would become official on 1 July once his contract at Yeovil Town expired)	MF	IRL	Sam Foley	Yeovil Town	Free transfer	
1 July 2015 (Note: The transfer was announced on 24 June and would become official on 1 July once his contract at Crewe Alexandra expired)	MF	JAM	Anthony Grant	Crewe Alexandra	Free transfer	
1 July 2015 (Note: The transfer was announced on 15 June and would become official on 1 July once his contract at Norwich City expired)	MF	EIR	Sam Kelly	Norwich City	Free transfer	
1 July 2015 (Note: The transfer was announced on 24 June and would become official on 1 July once his contract at Walsall expired)	DF	ENG	Ben Purkiss	Walsall	Free transfer	
1 July 2015 (Note: The transfer was announced on 15 June and would become official on 1 July once his contract at Newcastle United expired)	DF	ENG	Remie Streete	Newcastle United	Free transfer	
20 July 2015	FW	ENG	A-Jay Leitch-Smith	Yeovil Town	Free transfer	
6 August 2015	GK	ENG	Jak Alnwick	Newcastle United	Free transfer	
10 August 2015	FW	ENG	JJ Hooper	Havant & Waterlooville	£8,400 (compensation)	
25 January 2016	FW	JAM	Theo Robinson	(Scotland) Motherwell	Free transfer	

=== Transfers out ===
Date from	Position	Nationality	Name	To	Fee	Ref.
29 January 2016	DF	SLE	Aziz Deen-Conteh	(Moldova) Zaria Bălți	Released	
8 May 2016	FW	FRA	Achille Campion	(Republic of Ireland) Sligo Rovers	Released	
13 May 2016	DF	ENG	Lewis Bergin	Newcastle Town	Released	
13 May 2016	FW	ENG	Colin Daniel	Blackpool	Released	
13 May 2016	FW	ENG	Jonathon Kapend	Nantwich Town	Released	
13 May 2016	DF	NIR	Ryan McGivern	Shrewsbury Town	Released	
13 May 2016	GK	ENG	Chris Neal	Fleetwood Town	Released	
13 May 2016	MF	ENG	Chekaine Steele	Worcester City	Released	
13 May 2016	FW	JAM	Theo Robinson	Lincoln City	Released	
26 May 2016	FW	ENG	Louis Dodds	Shrewsbury Town	Rejected contract	
27 May 2016	DF	WAL	Richard Duffy	Eastleigh	Rejected contract	
27 May 2016	MF	NIR	Michael O'Connor	Notts County	Rejected contract	
31 May 2016	FW	ENG	A-Jay Leitch-Smith	Shrewsbury Town	Rejected contract	
17 June 2016	FW	ENG	Byron Moore	Bristol Rovers	Rejected contract	
23 June 2016	DF	ENG	Carl Dickinson	Notts County	Rejected contract	
1 July 2016	MF	TRI	Chris Birchall	Kidsgrove Athletic	Rejected contract	
5 July 2016	MF	GHA	Enoch Andoh	Whitehawk	Rejected contract	

=== Loans in ===
Date from	Position	Nationality	Name	From	Date until	Ref.
13 July 2015	FW	UGA	Uche Ikpeazu	Watford	2 January 2016	
27 July 2015	DF	ENG	Ryan Inniss	Crystal Palace	End of season	
28 August 2015	MF	ENG	Jak McCourt	Leicester City	26 September 2015	
25 January 2016	MF	NIR	Matty Kennedy	Cardiff City	7 April 2016	

=== Loans out ===
Date from	Position	Nationality	Name	To	Date until	Ref.
27 July 2015	DF	ENG	Nathan Smith	Torquay United	End of season	
11 August 2015	DF	SLE	Aziz Deen-Conteh	Boston United	12 September 2015	
24 August 2015	DF	ENG	Adam Yates	Northampton Town	8 September 2015	
25 August 2015	DF	ENG	Lewis Bergin	Kidsgrove Athletic	End of season	
28 August 2015	FW	ENG	Jonathon Kapend	Stafford Rangers	26 September 2015	
28 August 2015	MF	ENG	Chekaine Steele	Buxton	26 September 2015	
11 September 2015	MF	ENG	Omar Haughton	Newcastle Town	9 October 2015	
29 October 2015	FW	FRA	Achille Campion	Torquay United	29 November 2015	
6 November 2015	MF	WAL	Billy Reeves	Witton Albion	6 February 2016	
24 November 2015	MF	ENG	Ryan Lloyd	Chester	End of season	
27 November 2015	GK	ENG	Sam Johnson	FC Halifax Town	End of season	
29 January 2016	MF	ENG	Omar Haughton	Leek Town	End of season	
29 January 2016	MF	ENG	Chekaine Steele	Witton Albion	27 February 2016	
1 February 2016	GK	ENG	Chris Neal	Doncaster Rovers	20 February 2016	
12 February 2016	FW	ENG	Jonathon Kapend	Kidsgrove Athletic	12 March 2016	
12 February 2016	MF	WAL	Billy Reeves	Hyde United	12 March 2016	
23 February 2016	FW	ENG	Colin Daniel	Mansfield Town	End of season	
18 March 2016	GK	ENG	Chris Neal	Bury	End of season	
