= Sam Kelly (footballer) =

English footballer

Personal information
- Full name: Sam Alexander Kelly
- Date of birth: 21 October 1993 (age 33)
- Place of birth: Huntingdon, England
- Height: 6 ft 0 in (1.83 m)
- Positions: Winger; attacking midfielder

Youth career
- Cambridge United
- 2010–2012: Norwich City
- 2012–2013: Everton

Senior career*
Years	Team	Apps	(Gls)
2014	Cambridge City	3	(0)
2014–2015	Norwich City	0	(0)
2015–2017	Port Vale	49	(3)
2017–2018	Grimsby Town	8	(0)
2018–2019	Hamilton Academical	6	(0)
2019	Braintree Town	5	(1)
2019	Billericay Town	3	(0)
2019–2021	King's Lynn Town	32	(0)
Total		106	(4)
- * Club domestic league appearances and goals

Sam Alexander Kelly (born 21 October 1993) is an English former professional footballer who played as a winger.

He played for Cambridge United, Norwich City, Everton, and Cambridge City, before he found regular first-team football in the English Football League with Port Vale in the 2015–16 and 2016–17 campaigns. He joined Grimsby Town in May 2017. He stayed with the club for one season before he signed with Scottish Premiership side Hamilton Academical in June 2018. He returned to English non-League football with Braintree Town, Billericay Town and King's Lynn Town in 2019. He helped King's Lynn to win the National League North title in the 2019–20 season.

== Career ==
=== Early career ===
Kelly was born in Huntingdon, Cambridgeshire, and was attached to Cambridge United as a youth. He joined the Norwich City Academy in July 2010. He was released in March 2012 and joined the Everton Academy, before he left Everton in June 2013. He had a trial at Rangers in September 2013, but manager Ally McCoist was unable to offer him a contract due to financial restrictions. He joined Cambridge City of the Southern League Premier Division in February 2014. He returned to play for the Norwich under-21 side in the 2014–15 season.

=== Port Vale ===
Kelly signed a two-year contract with League One side Port Vale in June 2015. He made his debut in the Football League on 8 August in a 0–0 draw with rivals Crewe Alexandra at Gresty Road. After five further appearances he went three months without playing a game as Enoch Andoh, Sam Foley and Colin Daniel were preferred on the left-wing, before marking his return to the first-team with a goal and an assist in a 3–2 win over Chesterfield at Vale Park on 21 November. For his performance, he was named on the Football League Paper's team of the week. He got the chance to establish himself in the first team following a long-term injury to Andoh, and though initially inconsistent, he managed to impress manager Rob Page, who saw "glimpses" of his "terrific talent" by beating three defenders to score the only goal of the game against Bury on 28 December. He came off the bench against Coventry City on 7 February and scored another "sensational" goal to secure a 1–1 draw; this goal won him the club's Goal of the Season award.

Kelly fell out of the first-team picture under new manager Bruno Ribeiro and had to wait until the end of October for his first league start of the 2016–17 season. He then went on a run of seven consecutive starts. He was released by new manager Michael Brown following the club's relegation in May 2017.

=== Grimsby Town ===
On 31 May 2017, Kelly signed a two-year contract with League Two side Grimsby Town on a free transfer. He made 12 appearances throughout the 2017–18 campaign, of which only one came after Michael Jolley replaced Russell Slade as manager, as the "Mariners" posted an 18th-place finish. On 21 June 2018, Kelly left Blundell Park after his contract was cancelled by mutual consent.

=== Hamilton Academical ===
On 25 June 2018, Kelly signed for Scottish Premiership club Hamilton Academical. He said that he was convinced to join the club after listening to manager Martin Canning's passion and ambition. However, he made only nine appearances for the "Accies" in the first half of the 2018–19 season before leaving New Douglas Park in January 2019.

=== Non-League ===
On 7 February 2019, Kelly joined National League side Braintree Town. He scored one goal in five matches for the "Iron" before he moved on to National League South side Billericay Town the following month. He ended the 2018–19 campaign with three appearances for "Ricay".

On 1 June 2019, he signed with newly-promoted National League North side King's Lynn Town; "Linnets" manager Ian Culverhouse said Kelly was "a hell of a signing for this football club". He struggled for form at the start of the 2019–20 season, before improving enough to provide the assists for both of Town's goals in a 2–1 victory at Southport on 16 November. King's Lynn went on to win promotion as champions of the National League North after the league table was decided on points per game due to the COVID-19 pandemic in England. He was limited to just nine appearances in the 2020–21 season and was released at the end of June.

== Style of play ==
Kelly is a pacey left-winger who can also play behind the striker.

== Personal life ==
He is the younger brother of Ross and Danny Kelly.

== Career statistics ==
Appearances and goals by club, season and competition
Club	Season	League			National cup (Note: Includes FA Cup, Scottish Cup)		League cup (Note: Includes EFL Cup, Scottish League Cup)		Other		Total	
Club	Season	Division	Apps	Goals	Apps	Goals	Apps	Goals	Apps	Goals	Apps	Goals
Cambridge City	2013–14	Southern League Premier	3	0	0	0	0	0	2 (Note: Appearances in the Cambridgeshire Invitation Cup)	0	5	0
Norwich City	2014–15	Championship	0	0	0	0	0	0	0	0	0	0
Port Vale	2015–16	League One	28	3	1	0	2	0	0	0	31	3
Port Vale	2016–17	League One	21	0	3	0	1	0	1 (Note: Appearance(s) in the EFL Trophy)	0	26	0
Port Vale	Total		49	3	4	0	3	0	1	0	57	3
Grimsby Town	2017–18	League Two	8	0	0	0	1	0	3	0	12	0
Hamilton Academical	2018–19	Scottish Premiership	6	0	0	0	3	0	—		9	0
Braintree Town	2018–19	National League	5	1	0	0	—		0	0	5	1
Billericay Town	2018–19	National League South	3	0	0	0	—		0	0	3	0
King's Lynn Town	2019–20	National League North	24	0	1	0	—		1 (Note: Appearance(s) in the FA Trophy)	1	26	1
King's Lynn Town	2020–21	National League	8	0	0	0	—		1	0	9	0
King's Lynn Town	Total		32	0	1	0	0	0	2	1	35	1
Career total			106	4	5	0	7	0	8	1	126	5

== Honours ==
King's Lynn Town

- National League North: 2019–20
