= Colin Daniel =

English footballer (born 1988)

Personal information
- Full name: Colin Alan Daniel
- Date of birth: 15 February 1988 (age 38)
- Place of birth: Eastwood, England
- Height: 1.80 m (5 ft 11 in)
- Position: Left-back

Team information
- Current team: Ilkeston Town

Senior career*
Years	Team	Apps	(Gls)
2004–2007	Eastwood Town		
2007–2009	Crewe Alexandra	14	(1)
2008	→ Grays Athletic (loan)	1	(0)
2008	→ Leek Town (loan)	8	(3)
2008	→ Halifax Town (loan)	8	(5)
2009	→ Macclesfield Town (loan)	8	(0)
2009–2012	Macclesfield Town	117	(13)
2012–2014	Mansfield Town	69	(7)
2014–2016	Port Vale	48	(6)
2016	→ Mansfield Town (loan)	9	(2)
2016–2018	Blackpool	77	(8)
2018–2019	Peterborough United	20	(0)
2019–2021	Burton Albion	60	(1)
2021–2022	Exeter City	4	(0)
2022	→ Aldershot Town (loan)	10	(0)
2022–2023	Scunthorpe United	19	(1)
2023–2024	Worksop Town	21	(1)
2024–	Ilkeston Town (Note: Statistics for the 2025–26 season not known.)	37	(7)
- * Club domestic league appearances and goals as of 15:52, 12 May 2025 (UTC)

Colin Alan Daniel (born 15 February 1988) is an English footballer who plays for Northern Premier League Premier Division club Ilkeston Town. Primarily a left-sided defender, he can also play as a winger, wing-back, or forward.

Daniel began his career with non-League Eastwood Town before winning a move to Crewe Alexandra in July 2007. From Crewe he was loaned out to Grays Athletic, Leek Town, Halifax Town, and Macclesfield Town, before he joined Macclesfield Town permanently in May 2009. He spent three years with Macclesfield before moving on to Mansfield Town for an undisclosed fee in August 2012. He helped Mansfield to win the Conference Premier title in 2012–13. He signed with Port Vale in June 2014 before returning to Mansfield on loan in February 2016. He joined Blackpool in June 2016 and helped the club to achieve promotion out of EFL League Two via the play-offs in 2017. He joined Peterborough United in May 2018 before switching to Burton Albion in January 2019. He stayed with Burton for 18 months and signed with Exeter City in August 2021. He was loaned out to Aldershot Town in February 2022. Daniel returned to non-League football with Scunthorpe United for the 2022–23 season and signed with Worksop Town in June 2023. He joined Ilkeston Town the following season.

== Career ==
=== Crewe Alexandra ===
Crewe Alexandra signed Daniel from Northern Premier League side Eastwood Town for a "five-figure sum" in July 2007. He made his debut for the "Railwaymen" on 15 December, coming on as an 89th-minute substitute for Nicky Maynard in a 3–0 defeat to Hartlepool United at Victoria Park. He credited manager Steve Holland with playing him despite a great deal of pressure for results. In January 2008 Daniel signed for Conference Premier club Grays Athletic on a one-month loan. He later recalled that manager Justin Edinburgh picked him up from the train station and made him feel really welcome. He made his debut for the "Blues" coming on from the bench in the 1–1 FA Trophy third round match against York City at Bootham Crescent on 12 January. He made three appearances for Grays before returning to Crewe on 1 February. He joined Northern Premier League side Leek Town on loan in March 2008. He scored three goals in eight games for the club.

He joined the newly formed club Halifax Town on loan in the Northern Premier League Division One North in October 2008. He scored a hat-trick for Halifax against Clitheroe. He returned to Crewe and scored his first goal in the English Football League on 24 January in a 5–1 defeat to Northampton Town at Sixfields Stadium.

=== Macclesfield Town ===
Daniel joined Keith Alexander's Macclesfield Town on loan on 24 March for the remainder of the 2008–09 season. He played eight League Two games, and after being released by Crewe in May 2009, he signed a one-year contract with Macclesfield.

He made 41 appearances in the 2009–10 campaign and signed a new two-year deal with the club in April 2010. He scored ten goals in 49 games in the 2010–11 season.

Daniel underwent hernia surgery in August 2011, after manager Gary Simpson admitted that "we feel best to sort out now rather than risk it getting much worse". Despite injury problems restricting him to just five appearances at the start of the 2011–12 season, he signed a new one-year contract extension in October to keep him at the club until summer 2013. On 7 January, he scored in a 2–2 draw with Premier League side Bolton Wanderers in the FA Cup at Moss Rose.

=== Mansfield Town ===
Daniel was signed by Conference Premier side Mansfield Town for an undisclosed fee in August 2012. He ended the 2012–13 campaign with five goals in 43 appearances as Paul Cox's "Stags" won promotion into the Football League as champions of the Conference.

He scored three goals in 32 matches in the 2013–14 season, the first of which was a "powerful free-kick" against Morecambe that won him a place on the EFL team of the week. The third of these goals was the only goal of the game against Bristol Rovers to relegate Rovers out of the Football League on 3 May. This goal ensured him of a warm welcome at Bristol City, despite him never playing for the club. Nottingham Post reporter Sarah Clapson described Daniel, who played at left-wing-back in a 3–5–2 formation, as "a bit inconsistent" during the campaign despite showing good potential. He left the club after being offered a new contract on less money.

=== Port Vale ===
Daniel signed a two-year contract with League One club Port Vale in June 2014. Daniel said that "as soon as Micky Adams called me I couldn't say no because Port Vale are a big club." In October, new boss Rob Page told Daniel he was not a part of his first-team plans and suggested he go out on loan, but Daniel remained at Vale Park and on 1 November he came off the bench to score the winning goal away at Colchester United. He remained in and around the first-team, featuring 30 times throughout the 2014–15 season despite missing February with an ankle injury.

He started the 2015–16 campaign on the bench. He put himself in the frame for a place in the starting lineup after coming off the bench to score at Fleetwood Town on 26 September. However, by February he was behind Byron Moore, Matty Kennedy and Sam Kelly in the pecking order, and manager Rob Page allowed him to leave the club on loan after Daniel answered back during a half-time team talk. On 23 February, he returned to former club Mansfield on loan until the end of the season after being signed by manager Adam Murray, who was a teammate during Daniel's previous spell at the club. Port Vale released him upon the expiry of his contract at the end of the season.

=== Blackpool ===
In June 2016, Daniel joined League Two side Blackpool on a one-year contract with the option of a further year. Manager Gary Bowyer stated: "He offers pace, energy and creativity out wide and will be a great asset to have in the team." He opened his account with the club on his ninth appearance, scoring two goals to help secure a 3–0 win over Yeovil Town at Huish Park on 13 September – this performance earned him a place on the EFL team of the week. He ended the 2016–17 season with four goals in 41 games, including an appearance in the play-off final at Wembley Stadium where the "Tangerines" defeated Exeter City 2–1 to win promotion into League One.

Daniel reverted to playing as a left-back following a series of injuries to full-backs. He scored four goals in 44 appearances during the 2017–18 campaign as Blackpool consolidated their third-tier status with a 12th-place finish. After Daniel provided a hat-trick of assists in a 5–0 victory over Bradford City on 7 April, Bowyer stated that he believed Daniel could go on to play in the EFL Championship. Blackpool offered him a new contract but he instead opted to move on to a new club.

=== Peterborough United ===
On 24 May 2018, Daniel signed a two-year contract with League One side Peterborough United; manager Steve Evans said that "we have had to be patient as the kid has taken, quite rightly in my opinion, time to speak to a number of clubs that I would see competing at the top end of League One next season." He started the 2018–19 season in good form at left-back but was guilty of giving away too many penalties and slipped behind Tyler Denton and Daniel Lafferty in the pecking order. He featured 25 times for the "Posh" before he was dropped from the first-team and given permission to leave London Road on a free transfer following a 2–0 defeat at Barnsley on Boxing Day.

=== Burton Albion ===
On 21 January 2019, Daniel signed an 18-month contract with Burton Albion; manager Nigel Clough said the "Brewers" needed a left-sided player and "he's always done well when he's played against us". He featured 18 times in the second half of the 2018–19 season. He made 31 appearances in the 2019–20 campaign. He signed a new one-year contract in the summer with a "substantial wage cut" due to the financially devastating effects of the COVID-19 pandemic in England. He scored the opening goal of the EFL Cup tie with Premier League Aston Villa at the Pirelli Stadium on 15 September 2020. However, Villa came back to win the game. However, he struggled with back problem and found his first-team opportunities limited after Jimmy Floyd Hasselbaink replaced Jake Buxton as manager in January. He ended the 2020–21 season with 23 appearances to his name after Hasselbaink made some defensive acquisitions during the January transfer window. On 12 May 2021, it was announced that he would be one of 12 players leaving Burton at the end of the season. He went on to train with Basford United.

=== Exeter City ===
On 24 August 2021, Daniel joined League Two side Exeter City on a one-year deal. Manager Matt Taylor said that Daniel had impressed on trial "with character first and foremost". He was signed to provide cover for the injured Jack Sparkes, as only Callum Rowe and Jake Caprice could play on the left-hand side of the pitch at St James Park. He featured eight times for the "Grecians", scoring one goal in the EFL Trophy. On 26 February 2022, Daniel joined National League side Aldershot Town on loan for the remainder of the 2021–22 season. He played ten games for Mark Molesley's "Shots". Daniel was released by Exeter City after the club secured promotion at the end of the 2021–22 season.

=== Non-League ===
On 13 July 2022, Daniel joined newly-relegated National League club Scunthorpe United on a one-year contract having impressed manager Keith Hill during a one-week trial. He played 21 games in the 2022–23 season as Scunthorpe were relegated in 23rd-place, before being released at the end of the season. On 30 June 2023, he signed with Northern Premier League Premier Division club Worksop Town. Speaking in November, Daniel said he felt settled after initially struggling with form and injuries, and was enjoying being the understudy to Liam Hughes. He ended the 2023–24 campaign with two goals and 28 appearances.

On 9 August 2024, Daniel signed with Northern Premier League Premier Division rivals Ilkeston Town. Manager Ian Deakin was a former teammate at Eastwood Town. He scored seven goals in 41 games in the 2024–25 campaign Having been voted Chairman's Player of the Season, he signed a new one-year contract.

== Style of play ==
A left-sided player, he can play as a midfielder, winger, full-back, wing-back, or forward. In June 2014, Daniel stated that "I'm a quick player. I like to defend and retain the ball."

== Personal life ==
Colin Daniel married Izzy after meeting as teenagers and the couple had two sons together. He began working as a teaching assistant after leaving full-time professional football.

== Career statistics ==
As of match played 26 April 2025

Appearances and goals by club, season and competition
Club	Season	League			FA Cup		EFL Cup		Other		Total	
Club	Season	Division	Apps	Goals	Apps	Goals	Apps	Goals	Apps	Goals	Apps	Goals
Crewe Alexandra	2007–08	League One	1	0	0	0	0	0	0	0	1	0
Crewe Alexandra	2008–09	League One	13	1	3	0	0	0	0	0	16	1
Crewe Alexandra	Total		14	1	3	0	0	0	0	0	17	1
Grays Athletic (loan)	2007–08	Conference Premier	1	0	0	0	—		0	0	1	0
Leek Town (loan)	2007–08	Northern Premier League; Premier Division	8	3	0	0	—		0	0	8	3
Halifax Town (loan)	2007–08	Northern Premier League; Division One North	8	5	0	0	—		0	0	8	5
Macclesfield Town	2008–09	League Two	8	0	—		—		—		8	0
Macclesfield Town	2009–10	League Two	38	3	1	0	1	0	1 (Note: Appearance(s) in the Football League Trophy / EFL Trophy.)	0	41	3
Macclesfield Town	2010–11	League Two	43	8	3	1	1	1	2	0	49	10
Macclesfield Town	2011–12	League Two	36	2	5	1	0	0	0	0	41	3
Macclesfield Town	Total		125	13	9	2	2	1	3	0	139	16
Mansfield Town	2012–13	Conference Premier	41	5	2	0	—		0	0	43	5
Mansfield Town	2013–14	League Two	28	2	3	1	0	0	1	0	32	3
Mansfield Town	Total		69	7	5	1	0	0	1	0	75	8
Port Vale	2014–15	League One	28	4	1	0	1	0	0	0	30	4
Port Vale	2015–16	League One	20	2	2	0	1	0	2	0	25	2
Port Vale	Total		48	6	3	0	2	0	2	0	55	6
Mansfield Town (loan)	2015–16	League Two	9	2	0	0	0	0	0	0	9	2
Blackpool	2016–17	EFL League Two	33	4	1	0	2	0	4 (Note: 3 appearances in the EFL Trophy and 1 appearance in the play-offs.)	0	41	4
Blackpool	2017–18	EFL League One	44	4	0	0	0	0	0	0	44	4
Blackpool	Total		77	8	1	0	2	0	4	0	85	8
Peterborough United	2018–19	EFL League One	20	0	2	0	0	0	3	1	25	1
Burton Albion	2018–19	EFL League One	17	0	0	0	1	0	0	0	18	0
Burton Albion	2019–20	EFL League One	24	0	3	0	2	0	2	0	31	0
Burton Albion	2020–21	EFL League One	19	1	1	0	1	1	2	0	23	2
Burton Albion	Total		60	1	4	0	4	1	4	0	72	2
Exeter City	2021–22	EFL League Two	4	0	2	0	—		2	1	8	1
Aldershot Town (loan)	2021–22	National League	10	0	0	0	—		0	0	10	0
Scunthorpe United	2022–23	National League	19	1	1	0	—		1 (Note: Appearance(s) in the FA Trophy.)	0	21	1
Worksop Town	2023–24	Northern Premier League; Premier Division	21	1	1	0	—		6 (Note: 2 appearances in FA Trophy and four appearances and one goal in Sheffield & Hallamshire Senior Cup)	1	28	2
Ilkeston Town	2024–25	Northern Premier League; Premier Division	37	7	3	0	—		1 (Note: Appearance(s) in the Derbyshire Senior Cup.)	0	41	7
Ilkeston Town	2025–26	Northern Premier League; Premier Division										
Ilkeston Town	2026–27	Northern Premier League; Premier Division	0	0	0	0	—		0	0	0	0
Ilkeston Town	Total		37	7	3	0	0	0	1	0	41	7
Career total (Note: Statistics for Eastwood Town not known.)			511	54	33	3	9	1	25	3	578	61

== Honours ==
Mansfield Town

- Conference Premier: 2012–13

Blackpool

- EFL League Two play-offs: 2017
