= Enoch Andoh =

Ghanaian footballer

Ebo Andoh
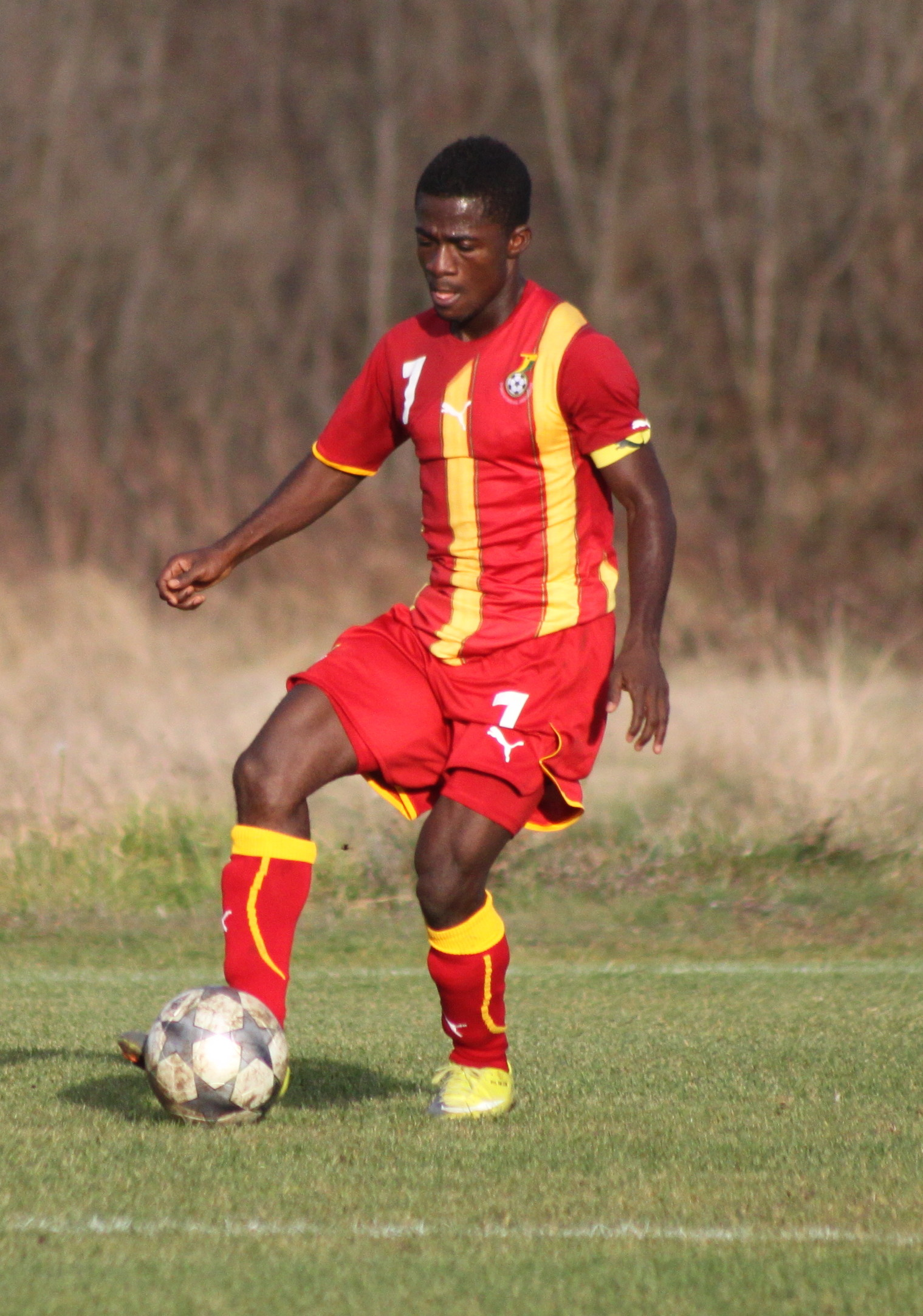
- Andoh pictured in 2010

Personal information
- Full name: Enoch Ebo Andoh
- Date of birth: 1 January 1993 (age 33)
- Place of birth: Kumasi, Ashanti, Ghana
- Height: 1.67 m (5 ft 6 in)
- Position: Winger

Team information
- Current team: Irchester United

Youth career
- Hearts of Oak
- King Faisal Babes
- 2011–2012: FC Porto

Senior career*
Years	Team	Apps	(Gls)
2012–2014	AEL Limassol	37	(1)
2014–2016	Port Vale	12	(1)
2017	Whitehawk	7	(1)
2018	Nuneaton Borough	9	(3)
2019	Macclesfield Town	0	(0)
2019–2020	Hednesford Town	2	(0)
2019	→ Wealdstone (loan)	0	(0)
2020	Nuneaton Borough	3	(0)
2020–2022	Stratford Town	19	(3)
2022	Biggleswade Town	17	(0)
2022–2024	St Ives Town	41	(5)
2024–2025	Daventry Town	4	(1)
2025–2026	Long Buckby	27	(13)
2026–	Irchester United	0	(0)

International career
2011	Ghana U20	1	(0)
- * Club domestic league appearances and goals as of 20:23, 25 April 2026 (UTC)

Enoch Ebo Andoh (born 1 January 1993) is a Ghanaian footballer who plays as a winger for Spartan South Midlands League Division One club Irchester United.

Andoh began his career in his native Ghana with Hearts of Oak and King Faisal Babes, before being signed up by Portuguese club FC Porto. He joined Cypriot side AEL Limassol in 2012, playing for the club in Cypriot Super Cup and Cypriot Cup final defeats before moving to England to play for Port Vale in November 2014. He broke into the first team in the 2015–16 season but picked up a serious injury in October 2015 and chose to leave the club in July 2016. He signed with Whitehawk in September 2017 and went on to join Nuneaton Borough in August 2018. He returned to the English Football League when he signed with Macclesfield Town in January 2019. He went on to play for Hednesford Town and Wealdstone before returning to Nuneaton Borough in January 2020. He moved on to Stratford Town in September 2020, then signed with Biggleswade Town in January 2022 and St Ives Town in August 2022. He spent two years at St Ives and then moved on to Daventry Town. He joined Long Buckby for the 2025–26 season, then moved on to Irchester United.

== Club career ==
=== Early career ===
Born in Kumasi, Andoh started his professional career with Hearts of Oak before transferring to league rivals King Faisal Babes in 2008 where he made his first-team debut. Having impressed in the Ghana Premier League, he was soon linked with a move abroad, including Free State Stars in South Africa.

In January 2011, he was sold to Portuguese club FC Porto. He was a key member of the club's under-19 side during the 2011–12 season, scoring seven times as the team won the Northern Section of the Under-19 Portuguese Championship. In the finals stage, he scored as Porto defeated arch-rivals Benfica 3–0, while the side finished the competition fourth overall.

He signed with Cypriot First Division side AEL Limassol in 2012 and played in the Cypriot Super Cup final defeat to AC Omonia on 18 August. Head coach Jorge Costa led the club to a fifth-place finish in the 2012–13 season. Andoh was an unused substitute in the Cypriot Cup final defeat to Apollon Limassol at the Tsirion Stadium. New boss Ivaylo Petev took them to second place in the 2013–14 campaign.

=== Port Vale ===
He signed an 18-month contract with English League One side Port Vale on 25 November 2014, following several weeks of training with the club. Having been overlooked for several months he enjoyed an impressive pre-season to force his way into the first-team picture for the 2015–16 season.

He made his debut in the English Football League on 8 August in a 0–0 draw with rivals Crewe Alexandra at Gresty Road. He soon secured his place as the club's first-choice left-winger, and quickly became a popular player with supporters due to his positive attacking play. Club chairman Norman Smurthwaite stated that he expected to sell Andoh for around £2.5 million in the January transfer window, and the Sunday People reported that Tottenham Hotspur were tracking the player. He scored his first goal for the club in a 1–1 draw with Peterborough United on 17 October. Three days later he suffered anterior cruciate damage in a collision with Colchester United goalkeeper Jamie Jones and was ruled out for the rest of the season. He left the club in July 2016 after failing to agree terms on a new contract. He returned to Vale Park to train with the youth team in December 2016. He played a reserve team game for the Vale, the first since his injury, on 8 March 2017.

=== Non-League ===
Andoh had a trial at Oldham Athletic in July 2017. On 15 September 2017, he signed for National League South club Whitehawk. He scored on his debut the following day in a 3–1 defeat to Oxford City in the second qualifying round of the FA Cup. However, he left the club in December 2017.

On 2 August 2018, Andoh signed with National League North side Nuneaton Borough after scoring for "Boro" in a pre-season friendly with former club Port Vale whilst on trial at Liberty Way. He scored four goals in 12 games in a three-month stay, and also picked up one assist and one player of the match award.

=== Macclesfield Town ===
On 11 January 2019, Andoh returned to the English Football League when he signed a short-term contract with League Two side Macclesfield Town. However, he did not play a first-team game for the "Silkmen" and was released by manager Sol Campbell at the end of the 2018–19 season.

=== Later career ===
On 22 September 2019, Andoh joined Hednesford Town of the Southern League Premier Division Central and won a penalty later that day in his debut for the "Pitmen" in an FA Cup game with Barwell. He also played one cup game for Wealdstone on 29 October 2019. He left the club on 21 January 2020 to rejoin Nuneaton Borough, now in the Southern League Premier Division Central. As a result of the COVID-19 pandemic in England, the 2019–20 season's competition was formally abandoned on 26 March 2020, with all results from the season being expunged, and no promotion or relegation taking place to, from, or within the competition. He switched to divisional rivals Stratford Town in September 2020. The 2020–21 season was also abandoned due to the ongoing pandemic in February 2021. He scored a hat-trick during a 5–3 defeat at Cirencester Town on 7 September 2021. He scored a total of seven goals from 24 games for the "Bards" in the first half of the 2021–22 campaign.

On 12 January 2022, Andoh signed with Biggleswade Town, also of the Southern League Premier Division Central. He made 18 appearances in the second half of the 2021–22 season, scoring one goal in the Bedfordshire Senior Cup, as the "Waders" were relegated into Division One Central. In August 2022, Andoh returned to the division when he joined St Ives Town. He scored eight goals in 41 appearances throughout the 2022–23 season. He played eight games in the 2023–24 campaign and failed to feature in a matchday squad after September.

Andoh joined United Counties League Premier Division South side Daventry Town at the start of the 2024–25 season. He played four games, scoring one goal. On 6 July 2025, he joined Spartan South Midlands League Division One club Long Buckby. He scored 13 goals in 29 games during the 2025–26 season. He joined league rivals Irchester United on 19 July 2026.

== International career ==
Andoh was named in the Ghana under-20 squad at the 2011 African Nations Championship in Sudan by head coach Orlando Wellington. He was called up to the under-23 side in April 2015.

== Style of play ==
Andoh is a winger who can take on defenders.

== Career statistics ==
As of end of the 2025–26 season

Appearances and goals by club, season and competition
Club	Season	League			National cup (Note: Includes Cypriot Cup, FA Cup)		League cup (Note: Includes EFL Cup, Southern Football League Cup)		Other		Total	
Club	Season	Division	Apps	Goals	Apps	Goals	Apps	Goals	Apps	Goals	Apps	Goals
AEL Limassol	2012–13	Cypriot First Division	20	0	4	0	—		1 (Note: Appearance(s) in the Cypriot Super Cup.)	0	25	0
AEL Limassol	2013–14	Cypriot First Division	17	1	2	0	—		0	0	19	1
AEL Limassol	Total		37	1	6	0	0	0	1	0	44	1
Port Vale	2014–15	League One	0	0	—		—		—		0	0
Port Vale	2015–16	League One	12	1	0	0	2	0	2 (Note: Appearance(s) in the Football League Trophy.)	0	16	1
Port Vale	Total		12	1	0	0	2	0	2	0	16	1
Whitehawk	2017–18	National League South	7	1	0	0	—		0	0	7	1
Nuneaton Borough	2018–19	National League North	9	3	2	0	—		1 (Note: Appearance(s) in the Birmingham Senior Cup.)	1	12	4
Macclesfield Town	2018–19	League Two	0	0	—		—		—		0	0
Hednesford Town	2019–20	Southern League Premier Division Central	2	0	2	0	1	1	0	0	5	1
Wealdstone	2019–20	National League South	0	0	0	0	—		1 (Note: Appearance(s) in the Middlesex Senior Cup.)	0	1	0
Nuneaton Borough	2019–20	Southern League Premier Division Central	3	0	0	0	0	0	1	0	4	0
Stratford Town	2020–21	Southern League Premier Division Central	4	1	1	0	0	0	1 (Note: Appearance(s) in the FA Trophy.)	0	6	1
Stratford Town	2021–22	Southern League Premier Division Central	15	2	6	1	1	3	2	1	24	7
Stratford Town	Total		19	3	7	1	1	3	3	1	30	8
Biggleswade Town	2021–22	Southern League Premier Division Central	17	0	0	0	0	0	1	1	18	1
St Ives Town	2022–23	Southern League Premier Division Central	33	5	4	1	0	0	4 (Note: 1 appearance in the FA Trophy, three appearances and three goals in the Huntingdonshire Senior Cup.)	2	41	8
St Ives Town	2023–24	Southern League Premier Division Central	8	0	0	0	0	0	0	0	8	0
St Ives Town	Total		41	5	4	1	0	0	4	2	49	8
Daventry Town	2024–25	United Counties League Premier Division South	4	1	0	0	—		0	0	4	1
Long Buckby	2025–26	Spartan South Midlands League Division One	27	13	0	0	—		2 (Note: 1 appearance in the Challenge Trophy and 1 appearance in the Les Underwood Junior Cup.)	0	29	13
Irchester United	2026–27	Spartan South Midlands League Division One	0	0	0	0	—		0	0	0	0
Career total			178	28	21	2	4	4	16	5	219	39

== Honours ==
AEL Limassol

- Cypriot Super Cup runner-up: 2013
- Cypriot Cup runner-up: 2013
- Cypriot First Division runner-up: 2013–14
