= Norman Smurthwaite =

English football club chairman

- Born: Norman Smurthwaite; 8 August 1960 (age 65); Coventry, England
- Occupations: Businessman; property developer
- Spouse: Lorraine

Chairman of Port Vale
- In office 2013–2017
- Preceded by: Paul Wildes
- Succeeded by: Tony Fradley
- In office 2018–2019
- Preceded by: Tony Fradley
- Succeeded by: Carol & Kevin Shanahan

Norman Smurthwaite (born 8 August 1960) is an English businessman and former football club chairman.

He qualified as an engineer and built a business career and property portfolio before retiring at the age of 50. He took over as chairman of Port Vale in 2013, having been a key figure in the boardroom as the club secured promotion out of League Two in 2012–13. He resigned as chairman following relegation back to League Two in 2016–17. He bought the Liberty Way stadium off Nuneaton Town in July 2018 and sold both Liberty Way and Port Vale in 2019.

== Early life ==
Smurthwaite was raised in Radford, Coventry and bought his own home in the area at the age of 17 after receiving compensation from an industrial accident at Dunlop in 1977. He qualified as an engineer and inherited an engineering firm in Holbrooks at the age of 21 from a friend who was a "father figure" to him. He sold the business two years later and moved to Nottingham, where he bought a chain of estate agents that he later sold on to the Halifax. He went on to invest in dozens of properties and retired at the age of 50. His father and family are from the Sunderland area; he owned a business in the North East between 1999 and 2007 and was a season ticket holder at Sunderland for seven seasons.

== Ownership of Port Vale ==
Smurthwaite was part of the investment group led by Paul Wildes that took Port Vale out of administration in November 2012. After promotion from League Two to League One was secured, Smurthwaite said that "I've never had any hobbies to speak of, but buying Port Vale has given me a passion. The club has reinvigorated me – it has saved me really, given me a new purpose." On 18 May, Paul Wildes made a shock decision to resign as chairman and sell his 50% stake to Smurthwaite, who became the club's chairman and sole owner; Wildes stated that "From many conversations with Norman, it's clear we have conflicting ideas on how to take Vale forward". It was revealed that Smurthwaite had funded the initial takeover, and that the pair had a disagreement following defeat to Bristol Rovers in March, with Smurthwaite insisting on a more public approach to take pressure off the manager and players. The Football League assigned Blackpool chairman Karl Oyston as his mentor.

In October 2013 Smurthwaite controversially banned local newspaper The Sentinel from all press events after taking objection with the newspaper's reporting a lengthy delay in producing specially presented third-kit shirts to fans who had pre-paid for the items in May. Smurthwaite responded by stating that the newspaper had been banned for contacting him personally for comment on the story rather than the club's media team, and that he was also frustrated with a Sentinel reporter for attempting to report facts which Smurthwaite had disclosed to the journalist "in confidence". More worry came in December, when The Sunday People revealed that Smurthwaite had e-mailed agents pleading poverty over the club's finances. He later issued a statement saying that the wage bill budget set by the club in the summer was over-ambitious and that he had been forced to meet the £1 million budget deficit out of his pocket. The concern in January was over the future of manager Micky Adams, and the apparent reluctance of Smurthwaite to offer a contract despite the positive results on the field as the manager's contract came close to its expiry at the end of the season; once a contract was promised Adams stated that "He has talked about it, now he has to deliver. I have never expressed a desire to leave. If everything is right I don't see there being a problem, but once again Norman is talking about things instead of doing things."

PVFC Limited, the club's holding company, was hit with a winding-up order by HM Revenue and Customs in July 2014; Smurthwaite insisted this would not affect the club and that a funding error caused the problem and expected the order to be withdrawn. Smurthwaite continued to effect changes at the club, controversially axing the system of door-to-door lottery collectors and banishing the Port Vale Community Trust out of Vale Park. Smurthwaite invested £500,000 into the playing budget in order to help Micky Adams strengthen the squad. Despite not wanting him to resign, once Adams left the club Smurthwaite initiated a policy of experimenting with young players in the hope of turning a profit from player sales in the future. He appointed Adams's former assistant Rob Page as first-team manager in October. He later claimed that he had considered appointing Jimmy Floyd Hasselbaink as manager, but decided against it partly because he believed that a racist minority of the club's supporters would make appointing a black manager a bad idea. Smurthwaite caused controversy by telling a reporter that supporters who only attended away matches (due partly to Vale Park's high ticket costs) "disgusted" him and that they should "go and support another club". In February, the home game with Doncaster Rovers was put into doubt after Smurthwaite refused to pay extra policing costs that Staffordshire Police had demanded following intelligence that there would be troublemakers instigating violence at the game. Smurthwaite denied Staffordshire Police and Crime Commissioner Matthew Ellis's claim that Smurthwaite threatened to close the club down during the dispute, but retracted his threat to bar police officers from entering the ground during the match. He further had to deny claims that he was picking the team, stating that first-team matters were purely down to Rob Page. In April 2015 an email from his account was sent to a group of supporters stating that he wished to sell the club, though he denied sending the email, claiming that he had been hacked.

"I will never allow the experience of another Exeter in my ownership of the football club. I will never allow a manager to tell me that's football and I should accept it. That ain't going to happen at Port Vale, because if it does, Plan B will be around the corner." – Speaking in July 2016, Smurthwaite was still angry about the defeat to Exeter City seven months previously.

Smurthwaite was rumoured to have planned to sack Page live on BT Sport if the club lost an FA Cup first round replay to Maidenhead United, though he dismissed the rumour as untrue. There was controversy However, following the club's defeat to mid-table League Two side Exeter City in the second round on 6 December 2015, after which Smurthwaite stated he felt "humiliated, ashamed and embarrassed" and said that plans to sign a striker in the January transfer window would be scrapped. The following day he officially put the club up for sale. He set an asking price of £4.25 million, stating "I have never lost money on a transaction in my adult life and I am not starting now". He continued to reveal that he had been physically assaulted by three Vale supporters in April 2014, though Staffordshire Police could find no record of Smurthwaite's complaint. He also admitted that he had been planning on buying Torquay United before being told by the Football League that he would not be allowed to own two clubs. He was also criticised by Kick It Out, football's equality and inclusion organisation, after admitting that he had denied Hasselbaink the opportunity of being Port Vale manager due to his concern that a black manager would be abused by some supporters. Some of the club's biggest name players rejected new contract offers and left Port Vale after Northampton Town paid compensation to Port Vale to sign Page as manager in May 2016; Smurthwaite claimed that he purposely set a low wage budget to drive Page and the players out of the club, thereby leaving room in the 2016–17 budget for a new manager to sign his own players.

Smurthwaite renewed his dispute with The Sentinel by banning the newspaper from attending the club's press conference where the successor to Page was named. Upon appointing Portuguese manager Bruno Ribeiro, the club's first manager from outside Britain, Smurthwaite stated that: "It has been a long, extensive process but I'm absolutely certain we have the right man for the job." Smurthwaite then improved the club's budget to allow over ten new, mostly foreign, signings, and stated that he expected Vale to be challenging for the top six and warned his staff that he would enact "plan B" if the club were not in the top six by Christmas. With Vale occupying 17th-place at Christmas, Smurthwaite declared that 'Plan B' had been triggered, meaning the signing of "seasoned, higher grade" players, whilst he admitted he felt "a little bit hoodwinked" as Ribeiro's friends in the game (José Mourinho, Aitor Karanka, and Carlos Carvalhal) had provided him with glowing references but had thus far failed to lend any of their players to the Vale. Ribeiro resigned as manager of Port Vale on 26 December, hours after witnessing his side lose 1–0 at home to Walsall; Smurthwaite put Michael Brown in temporary charge. He also installed Colin Garlick as the club's CEO, and in January stated that "I'm only really involved now when it comes to prising open the sweetie jar for the money". Two months later, Smurthwaite used the OneValeFan fansite to ask supporters to vote whether he should sell the club to one of two hedge funds that he said had met his asking price for the club. He later issued a statement to apologize for his decision to appoint Ribeiro and expressed regret with his own attempts to communicate with fans and "keyboard warriors" over social media. Brown remained as caretaker manager for the rest of the season, but was unable to save the club from relegation back into League Two. Smurthwaite issued a statement on 2 May apologising for relegation, and stated that he would be stepping down as chairman and would no longer attend games as he looked to sell the club. Three days later, he received a bid of £1.25 million for the club, matching his original purchase price in 2012. A rival consortium also offered the same figure, but Smurthwaite rejected both offers.

With Port Vale lying bottom of the English Football League, Smurthwaite sacked Brown on 16 September and claimed that he had been against giving Brown the job permanently in the summer but left the decision to Chief Executive Colin Garlick. Smurthwaite appointed Neil Aspin as the club's new manager on 4 October, and also brought in John Rudge in an advisory role. Aspin steered the club away from relegation by the end of the 2017–18 season. In June 2018, Smurthwaite revealed that he had rejected another offer to buy the club from an unnamed bidder.

He bought the Liberty Way stadium off Nuneaton Town in July 2018 after the club entered financial difficulties. He returned formally to the role of Port Vale chairman the following month. He was hospitalised after being struck by a car whilst walking outside Vale Park on 25 January 2019. Aspin resigned five days later following a run of poor results. On 31 January 2019, Smurthwaite blamed "logistical challenges" for the deal to bring back former top-scorer Marc Richards breaking down; the club instead signed four youngsters despite having no manager. As the transfer window was closing, the Port Vale Supporters' Club unanimously gave a vote of no confidence in Smurthwaite and elected to begin formal protests against his ownership. During this time the club was serving players unsold pies from matchdays in order to save money. Smurthwaite went on to issue a statement to condemn "disgraceful abuse" he had received and to urge supporters not to use "inappropriate language" during protests and to consider the effect of protests on the club and the players; he stated that he was only involved in "major" decisions at the club and left day-to-day decisions to CEO Colin Garlick. He went on to name John Askey as the club's new manager on 4 February. On 1 March, Synectics Solutions owners Carol and Kevin Shanahan revealed that Smurthwaite had rejected their improved offer of £3.5 million for the club. When the couple told Smurthwaite they were planning to go public about their offer, he texted them to say "sorry not interested. now please get back to your day job and continue the sterling work in the community." He went on to claim that fans protests against him had cost the club a £500,000 stadium sponsorship deal, that he had never received a "formal offer" for the club and that he would put the club into administration if no new owner were in place by 5 May. The sale of both the club and the ground to the Shanahans was confirmed on 7 May, ending Smurthwaite's seven-year reign.

== Later life ==
Smurthwaite was reported to have made a bid for National League club Notts County in June 2019, but denied having done so. Two months later he was reported to have launched an unsuccessful bid to purchase crisis-hit club Bury. He sold Liberty Way stadium in 2019. He enquired for a move for Wigan Athletic, a club in administration, in September 2020, but pulled out after judging it to be too big of a risk and seeing a negative reaction from fans.
