= 2017–18 Bristol Rovers F.C. season =

Bristol Rovers
2017–18 season
- Chairman: Steve Hamer
- Manager: Darrell Clarke
- Stadium: Memorial Stadium
- League One: 13th
- FA Cup: First round (Vs. Notts County)
- EFL Cup: Third round (Vs. Wolverhampton Wanderers)
- EFL Trophy: Group stage
Home colours	Away colours

The 2017–18 season is the 135th season in Bristol Rovers' history and their 90th in the English Football League. Rovers will compete in the third tier of English football, League One as well as three cup competitions, FA Cup, EFL Cup and EFL Trophy.

== Competitions ==
=== Friendlies ===
As of 2 June 2017, Bristol Rovers have announced thirteen pre-season friendlies against Hull City in Portugal Corinthian Casuals, Yate Town, Melksham Town, Weston-super-Mare, Mangotsfield United, Salisbury, Gloucester City, Taunton Town, Forest Green Rovers, Yeovil Town, Bath City and West Bromwich Albion.

8 July 2017	Yate Town	0–0	Bristol Rovers	Yate
15:00 BST		Report		Stadium: Lodge Road; Attendance: 910

8 July 2017	Melksham Town	1–6	Bristol Rovers	Melksham
15:00 BST	Davidson 62' (pen.)	Report	Harrison 6'; Bodin 40'; Gaffney 74', 86', 90'; Sercombe 85'	Stadium: The Oakfield Stadium; Attendance: 1,476

11 July 2017	Weston-super-Mare	0–3	Bristol Rovers	Weston-super-Mare
19:45 BST		Report	Gaffney 28'; Harrison 65'; Broom 75'	Stadium: Woodspring Stadium; Attendance: 710

12 July 2017	Mangotsfield United	1–2	Bristol Rovers	Mangotsfield
19:45 BST	Lloyd 32'	Report	Leigh-Gilchrist 23'; Ellington 26'	Stadium: Cossham Street; Attendance: 1,050

15 July 2017	Salisbury	0–2	Bristol Rovers	Old Sarum
13:00 BST		Report	Ebbutt 4'; Gaffney 62'	Stadium: The Raymond McEnhill Stadium; Referee: Ian Parsons

15 July 2017	Gloucester City	1–1	Bristol Rovers	Evesham
15:00 BST	Richards	Report	Harrison	Stadium: Spiers and Hartwell Jubilee Stadium

18 July 2017	Bristol Rovers	1–2	Hull City	Albufeira, Portugal
18:30 WEST	Gaffney 50'	Report	Hernández 57'; Bowen 87'	Stadium: Estadio da Nora

18 July 2017	Taunton Town	2–2	Bristol Rovers	Taunton
19:45 BST	Morgan 41'; McGlade 89'		Pugh 71'; Staley 90'	Stadium: The Viridor Stadium; Attendance: 417

22 July 2017	Forest Green Rovers	2–0	Bristol Rovers	Nailsworth
15:00 BST	Noble 14'; Mullings 65'	Report		Stadium: The New Lawn

25 July 2017	Yeovil Town	1–3	Bristol Rovers	Yeovil
19:45 BST	Smith 52'	Report	Bodin 45', 47'; Moore 57'	Stadium: Huish Park

26 July 2017	Bath City	1–0	Bristol Rovers	Twerton
19:45 BST	Case 73'	Report		Stadium: Twerton Park

29 July 2017	Bristol Rovers	2–1	West Bromwich Albion	Horfield
15:00 BST	Harrison 5'; Nichols 86'	Report	Dawson 90'	Stadium: Memorial Stadium

31 July 2017	Corinthian-Casuals	3–1	Bristol Rovers	Tolworth
19:45 BST	Uzun 11', 39' (pen.), 64' (pen.)	Report	Dünnwald 86'	Stadium: King George's Field

=== League One ===
==== League table ====
Pos	Team	Pld	W	D	L	GF	GA	GD	Pts
11	Bradford City	46	18	9	19	57	67	−10	63
12	Blackpool	46	15	15	16	60	55	+5	60
13	Bristol Rovers	46	16	11	19	60	66	−6	59
14	Fleetwood Town	46	16	9	21	59	68	−9	57
15	Doncaster Rovers	46	13	17	16	52	52	0	56

Source: BBC Sport
Rules for classification: 1) Points; 2) Goal difference; 3) Number of goals scored

==== Result summary ====
Overall								Home						Away					
Pld	W	D	L	GF	GA	GD	Pts	W	D	L	GF	GA	GD	W	D	L	GF	GA	GD
46	16	11	19	60	66	−6	59	11	6	6	38	30	+8	5	5	13	22	36	−14

Last updated: 13 January 2018.
Source: Statto.com

==== Results by matchday ====
Matchday	1	2	3	4	5	6	7	8	9	10	11	12	13	14	15	16	17	18	19	20	21	22	23	24	25	26	27	28	29	30	31	32	33	34	35	36	37	38	39	40	41	42	43	44	45	46
Ground	A	H	A	H	A	H	H	A	H	A	H	A	H	A	A	H	A	H	A	H	H	A	H	A	A	H	A	H	A	H	A	H	A	H	A	H	A	A	H	A	H	H	A	H	H	A
Result	L	L	W	W	L	W	L	L	W	L	W	W	L	L	L	W	L	L	L	W	W	L	L	D	D	W	D	W	W	L	W	W	L	D	W	D	L	D	W	L	D	D	L	D	D	D
Position	18	24	18	11	14	12	12	15	14	16	14	12	13	13	16	13	15	16	18	15	15	17	17	17	17	17	17	14	11	13	11	11	12	12	10	9	10	11	10	10	10	11	12	13	13	13

Updated to match(es) played on 13 January 2018. Source: Statto
A = Away; H = Home; W = Win; D = Draw; L = Loss

==== Matches ====
On 21 June 2017, the league fixtures were announced.

5 August 2017 1	Charlton Athletic	1–0	Bristol Rovers	Charlton
15:00 BST	Novak (red card) 6'; Bauer 38'	Report	Sercombe (yellow card) 27'	Stadium: The Valley; Attendance: 12,968; Referee: Chris Sarginson

12 August 2017 2	Bristol Rovers	1–4	Peterborough United	Horfield
15:00 BST	Sercombe (yellow card) 14'; Gaffney 85'	Report	Marriott 6', 55', 90+5'; Grant (yellow card) 19'; Taylor (yellow card) 45', (goal) 78'	Stadium: Memorial Stadium; Attendance: 9,758; Referee: Nick Kinseley

19 August 2017 3	Bury	2–3	Bristol Rovers	Bury
15:00 BST	Beckford 90'; Ajose 90+3'	Report	Lockyer 55'; Bodin 73', 85'	Stadium: Gigg Lane; Attendance: 3,402; Referee: Carl Boyeson

26 August 2017 4	Bristol Rovers	3–1	Fleetwood Town	Horfield
15:00 BST	Sinclair 26'; Bodin 43'; Clarke (yellow card) 54'; Harrison 79'	Report	Cole 60'	Stadium: Memorial Stadium; Attendance: 8,363; Referee: John Busby

2 September 2017 5	Bradford City	3–1	Bristol Rovers	Bradford
12:30 BST	Wyke 13', 62', 73'; Vincelot (yellow card) 54'	Report	Bodin 80'	Stadium: Valley Parade; Attendance: 19,284; Referee: David Webb

9 September 2017 6	Bristol Rovers	2–1	Walsall	Horfield
15:00 BST	Gaffney 5'; Clarke (yellow card) 28' (goal) 86'; Slocombe (red card) 60'; Leadbitter (yellow card) 74'; Bodin (yellow card) 79'; Brown (yellow card) 84'; Lockyer (yellow card) 90+2'	Report	Wilson (yellow card) 47' (goal) 58'; Edwards (yellow card) 78'; Ismail (yellow card) 85'; Roberts (yellow card) 90+2'	Stadium: Memorial Stadium; Attendance: 8,544; Referee: John Brooks

12 September 2017 7	Bristol Rovers	2–3	Oldham Athletic	Horfield
19:45 BST	Gaffney 83'; Sweeney 85'; Telford (yellow card) 90+7'	Report	Byrne 49'; Gardner (yellow card) 60'; Davies 71'; Doyle 88'; Fané (yellow card) 90+7'	Stadium: Memorial Stadium; Attendance: 7,908; Referee: Brett Huxtable

16 September 2017 8	Wigan Athletic	3–0	Bristol Rovers	Wigan
15:00 BST	Powell 30'; Grigg 49'; Morsy (yellow card) 67'; Jacobs (yellow card) 72'; Evans (yellow card) 81'; Massey 90+5'	Report	Sweeney (red card) 30'	Stadium: DW Stadium; Attendance: 8,732; Referee: Carl Boyeson

23 September 2017 9	Bristol Rovers	3–1	Blackpool	Horfield
15:00 BST	Partington (yellow card) 17'; Bodin 40'; Moore (yellow card) 45+1'; Broadbent (yellow card) 50'; Telford (yellow card) 75'; Lines (yellow card) 79'; Sweeney 84'; Harrison 90+3'	Report	Vassell 12'	Stadium: Memorial Stadium; Attendance: 8,431; Referee: Gavin Ward

26 September 2017 10	Portsmouth	3–0	Bristol Rovers	Portsmouth
19:45 BST	O'Keefe (yellow card) 29'; Hawkins 42'; Pitman 77', 85'	Report	Harrison (yellow card) 39'; Lockyer (yellow card) 57'	Stadium: Fratton Park; Attendance: 17,716; Referee: John Busby

30 September 2017 11	Bristol Rovers	2–1	Plymouth Argyle	Horfield
15:00 BST	Gaffney 22'; Clarke (yellow card) 40'; Bodin 62'; Harrison (yellow card) 65'; Lines (yellow card) 90+2'; Brown (yellow card) 90+4'	Report	Blissett 52'; Carey (yellow card) 57'; Miller (red card) 64'; Edwards (yellow card) 90+4'	Stadium: Memorial Stadium; Attendance: 9,879; Referee: Graham Salisbury

7 October 2017 12	Northampton Town	0–6	Bristol Rovers	Northampton
15:00 BST	Grimes (yellow card) 42'; Revell (red card) 69'	Report	Bodin 37'; Harrison 56', 61'; Gaffney 72'; Sercombe 76'; Telford 86'	Stadium: Sixfields Stadium; Attendance: 6,087; Referee: Mark Heywood

14 October 2017 13	Bristol Rovers	0–1	Oxford United	Horfield
15:00 BST	Clarke (yellow card) 45'; Gaffney (yellow card) 47'; Sercombe (yellow card) 70'	Report	Henry (yellow card) 45+3' (goal) 82'; Mousinho (yellow card) 50'; Ribeiro (yellow card) 61'; Rothwell (yellow card) 77'	Stadium: Memorial Stadium; Attendance: 9,656; Referee: Ross Joyce

17 October 2017 14	Shrewsbury Town	4–0	Bristol Rovers	Shrewsbury
19:45 BST	Rodman 12'; Morris 24'; Nolan 29'; Brown 41'	Report	Lines (yellow card) 44'	Stadium: New Meadow; Attendance: 5,652; Referee: Darren Handley

21 October 2017 15	Rochdale	1–0	Bristol Rovers	Spotland
15:00 BST	Done 7'	Report	Harrison (yellow card) 63'; Sinclair (yellow card) 87'	Stadium: Spotland Stadium; Attendance: 2,944; Referee: Scott Oldham

28 October 2017 16	Bristol Rovers	2–0	Milton Keynes Dons	Horfield
15:00 BST	Nichols 65'; Gaffney 72'	Report	Upson (yellow card) 59'	Stadium: Memorial Stadium; Attendance: 8,701; Referee: Michael Salisbury

11 November 2017 17	Scunthorpe United	1–0	Bristol Rovers	Scunthorpe
15:00 GMT	Ojo (yellow card) 42'; Bishop (yellow card) 57' (goal) 90+4'	Report	Nichols (yellow card) 57'; Leadbitter (yellow card) 87'	Stadium: Glanford Park; Attendance: 4,210; Referee: Seb Stockbridge

18 November 2017 18	Bristol Rovers	1–3	AFC Wimbledon	Horfield
15:00 GMT	Sinclair (yellow card) 14'; Brown 88'	Report	Barcham 2'; Forrester 45+2' (yellow card) 78'; McDonald 61'	Stadium: Memorial Stadium; Attendance: 8,734; Referee: John Brooks

25 November 2017 19	Blackburn Rovers	2–1	Bristol Rovers	Blackburn
15:00 GMT	Mulgrew 61' (pen.); Samuel 67'; Nyambe (yellow card) 78'	Report	Harrison (yellow card) 58' (goal) 58'; Leadbitter (yellow card) 86'	Stadium: Ewood Park; Attendance: 11,660; Referee: Ross Joyce

2 December 2017 20	Bristol Rovers	2–1	Rotherham United	Horfield
15:00 GMT	Clarke (yellow card) 30'; Harrison 64'; Sercombe 75'; Smith (yellow card) 79'; Sweeney (yellow card) 81'	Report	Williams 56'; Moore (red card) 79'	Stadium: Memorial Stadium; Attendance: 7,531; Referee: Brett Huxtable

9 December 2017 21	Bristol Rovers	3–0	Southend United	Horfield
15:00 GMT	Bodin 15'; Harrison 74'; Sercombe 86'	Report	Ferdinand (yellow card) 44'	Stadium: Memorial Stadium; Attendance: 8,062; Referee: Tom Nield

16 December 2017 22	Gillingham	4–1	Bristol Rovers	Gillingham
15:00 GMT	Byrne 28' 53'; Lacey 37'; Parker 47'; Martin (yellow card) 67'; Ehmer (yellow card) 90+4'	Report	Smith (yellow card) 65'; Sercombe 90+1'	Stadium: Priestfield Stadium; Attendance: 4,227; Referee: (England) Anthony Coggins

23 December 2017 23	Bristol Rovers	0–1	Doncaster Rovers	Horfield
15:00 GMT	Partington (yellow card) 76'; Sercombe (yellow card) 90+1'	Report	Mason 33' (pen.); Wright (yellow card) 62'; Houghton (yellow card) 77'	Stadium: Memorial Stadium; Attendance: 8,300; Referee: (England) Dean Whitestone

26 December 2017 24	Walsall	0–0	Bristol Rovers	Walsall
15:00 GMT	Leahy (yellow card) 23'	Report	Clarke (yellow card) 59'; Lines (yellow card) 85'	Stadium: Bescot Stadium; Attendance: 5,759; Referee: (England) Rob Lewis

30 December 2017 25	Oldham Athletic	1–1	Bristol Rovers	Oldham
15:00 GMT	Davies 72'; Bryan (yellow card) 90'	Report	Sinclair (yellow card) 38'; Bodin 49'	Stadium: Boundary Park; Attendance: 3,928; Referee: (England) Michael Salisbury

1 January 2018 26	Bristol Rovers	2–1	Portsmouth	Horfield
15:00 GMT	Partington (yellow card) 81'; Sinclair 84'; Sercombe 90'	Report	Hawkins 64'	Stadium: Memorial Stadium; Attendance: 10,014; Referee: (England) David Webb

13 January 2018 27	Blackpool	0–0	Bristol Rovers	Blackpool
15:00 GMT		Report	Clarke (yellow card) 40'	Stadium: Bloomfield Road; Attendance: 4,001; Referee: (England) Martin Coy

20 January 2018 28	Bristol Rovers	3–1	Bradford City	Horfield
15:00 GMT	Broadbent (yellow card) 38'; Partington 53'; Lines 83' (pen.); Sercombe 87'	Report	Wyke 38' (pen.)	Stadium: Memorial Stadium; Attendance: 9,064; Referee: Lee Swaby

27 January 2018 29	Doncaster Rovers	1–3	Bristol Rovers	Doncaster
15:00 GMT	Marquis 4'; Whiteman (yellow card) 39'	Report	Sweeney 24'; Gaffney 50'; Harrison (yellow card) 83'; Harrison 85'	Stadium: Keepmoat Stadium; Attendance: 8,021; Referee: Darren Bond

3 February 2018 30	Bristol Rovers	1–2	Shrewsbury Town	Horfield
15:00 GMT	Lines (yellow card) 62'; Partington 65'	Report	Beckles 62'; Rodman 88'; Payne (yellow card) 89'	Stadium: Memorial Stadium; Attendance: 9,380; Referee: Trevor Kettle

10 February 2018 31	Oxford United	1–2	Bristol Rovers	Oxford
15:00 GMT	Rothwell 2'; Martin (yellow card) 22'	Report	Bennett 68', (yellow card) 87'; Harrison 80'	Stadium: Kassam Stadium; Attendance: 8,471; Referee: Gavin Ward

13 February 2018 32	Bristol Rovers	3–2	Rochdale	Horfield
19:45 GMT	Sercombe 49'; Partington 65', (yellow card) 71'; Lines 79', Lines (yellow card) 90+4'	Report	Henderson 29', 66'; Cannon (yellow card) 45+1'; Camps (yellow card) 78'	Stadium: Memorial Stadium; Attendance: 9,219; Referee: Chris Sarginson

17 February 2018 33	AFC Wimbledon	1–0	Bristol Rovers	Kingsmeadow
15:00 GMT	Pigott 90+3'	Report		Attendance: 4,837; Referee: Charles Breakspear

24 February 2018 34	Bristol Rovers	1–1	Scunthorpe United	Horfield
15:00 GMT	Harrison 90+1'	Report	Hopper (yellow card) 40'; McGeehan (yellow card) 51'; Gilks (yellow card) 59'; Holmes 61'	Stadium: Memorial Stadium; Attendance: 8,346; Referee: Darren Handley

27 February 2018 P	Bristol Rovers	P–P	Wigan Athletic	Horfield
19:45 GMT		Report		Stadium: Memorial Stadium; Referee: Stephen Martin
Note: Match postponed due to frozen pitch

3 March 2018 35	Milton Keynes Dons	0–1	Bristol Rovers	Milton Keynes
15:00 GMT	Cissé (yellow card) 41'; Brittain (yellow card) 78'; Aneke (yellow card) 89'	Report	Harrison 50'; Craig (yellow card) 70'	Stadium: Stadium MK; Attendance: 8,240; Referee: Antony Coggins

11 March 2018 36	Bristol Rovers	1–1	Northampton Town	Bristol
15:00 GMT	Bennett 34'	Report	Luckassen 62'; Crooks (red card)	Stadium: Memorial Stadium; Attendance: 9,054; Referee: Eddie Ilderton

17 March 2018 37	Plymouth Argyle	3–2	Bristol Rovers	Plymouth
15:00 GMT	Carey (yellow card) 14', (goal) 85'; Ness 34', 48'; Matthews (yellow card) 58'	Report	Lines 12'; Harrison 36'; Partington (yellow card) 64'; Lockyer (yellow card) 85'; Bennett (yellow card) 90+4'	Stadium: Home Park; Attendance: 13,466 (1,593 away); Referee: John Brooks

24 March 2018 38	Peterborough United	1–1	Bristol Rovers	Peterborough
15:00 GMT	Lloyd 59'	Report	Craig 55'	Stadium: London Road Stadium; Attendance: 5,953; Referee: Carl Boyeson

30 March 2018 39	Bristol Rovers	2–1	Bury	Bristol
	Clarke (yellow card) 10'; Telford 65'; Lines 85' (pen.)	Report	Laurent (yellow card) 19'; Danns 54'; Cooney (yellow card) 85'	Stadium: Memorial Stadium; Attendance: 9,030; Referee: Lee Collins

2 April 2018 40	Fleetwood Town	2–0	Bristol Rovers	Fleetwood
15:00 BST	Toumani Diagouraga (yellow card) 41'; Ashley Hunter 78'; Jordy Hiwula 89'	Report	Chris Lines (yellow card) 55' (yellow-red card) 57'	Stadium: Highbury Stadium; Attendance: 2,890; Referee: Ross Joyce

7 April 2018 41	Bristol Rovers	1–1	Charlton Athletic	Bristol
15:00 BST	Bennett 21'	Report	Reeves 45'	Stadium: Memorial Stadium; Attendance: 9,336; Referee: Andy Davies

14 April 2018 42	Bristol Rovers	1–1	Blackburn Rovers	Bristol
15:00 BST	Broadbent (yellow card) 61'; Clarke (yellow card) 63'; Lines 90+4'	Report	Mulgrew 65'; Lenihan (yellow card) 83'	Stadium: Memorial Stadium; Attendance: 10,029; Referee: Kevin Johnson

21 April 2018 43	Rotherham United	2–0	Bristol Rovers	Rotherham
15:00 BST	Michael Smith 9'; Caolan Lavery 90'	Report	Ellis Harrison (yellow card) 77'	Stadium: New York Stadium; Attendance: 8,579; Referee: Andy Haines

24 April 2018 44	Bristol Rovers	1–1	Wigan Athletic	Bristol
19:45 BST	Liam Sercombe 28'	Report	Ryan Colclough 80'	Stadium: Memorial Stadium; Attendance: 8,414; Referee: Stephen Martin

28 April 2018 45	Bristol Rovers	1–1	Gillingham	Bristol
19:45 BST	Ellis Harrison (yellow card) 45+1'; Kyle Bennett (yellow card) 52'; Dom Telford 86'	Report	Mark Byrne (yellow card) 35'; Elliott List 90+4'	Stadium: Memorial Stadium; Attendance: 9,715; Referee: Ollie Yates

5 May 2018 46	Southend United	0–0	Bristol Rovers	Southend-on-Sea
19:45 BST	Mark Oxley (yellow card) 9'; Harry Kyprianou (yellow card) 26'	Report	Ollie Clarke (yellow card) 10' (yellow-red card) 42'; Tom Broadbent (yellow card) 75'	Stadium: Roots Hall; Attendance: 8,179; Referee: Anthony Coggins

=== FA Cup ===
On 16 October 2017, Bristol Rovers were away to Notts County in the first round.

3 November 2017 First round	Notts County	4–2	Bristol Rovers	Nottingham
19:45 GMT	Yates 30', 31'; Stead 58'; Jones (yellow card) 90+4'; Grant 90+6'	Report	Sercombe 8'; Sinclair 12'; Clarke (yellow card) 64'	Stadium: Meadow Lane; Attendance: 4,228; Referee: Graham Salisbury

=== EFL Cup ===
On 16 June 2017, Bristol Rovers were drawn at home to Cambridge United in the first round. Rovers were drawn away in the second round against Fulham. Another away tie against Wolverhampton Wanderers was confirmed for the third round.

8 August 2017 First round	Bristol Rovers	4–1	Cambridge United	Horfield
19:45 BST	Bodin 13' 42'; Harrison 61'; Sercombe 70'	Report	Dunk (yellow card) 3'; Ikpeazu 66'	Stadium: Memorial Stadium; Attendance: 4,114; Referee: Kevin Johnson

22 August 2017 Second round	Fulham	0–1	Bristol Rovers	Fulham
19:45 BST		Report	Harrison 13'; Slocombe (yellow card) 85'; Gaffney (yellow card) 85'; Sweeney (yellow card) 90+3'	Stadium: Craven Cottage; Attendance: 6,243; Referee: Dean Whitestone

19 September 2017 Third round	Wolverhampton Wanderers	1–0 (a.e.t.)	Bristol Rovers	Wolverhampton
19:45 BST	Douglas (yellow card) 72'; Batth (yellow card) 74'; Enobakhare 98'; Price (yellow card) 102'; N'Diaye (yellow card) 102'	Report	Harrison (yellow card) 58'; Telford (yellow card) 90+4'; Lockyer (red card) 120'	Stadium: Molineux Stadium; Attendance: 12,740; Referee: Tony Harrington

=== EFL Trophy ===
On 12 July 2017, the group stage draw was completed with Rovers facing Swindon Town, West Ham United U23s and Wycombe Wanderers in Southern Group C.

Pos	Lge	Team	Pld	W	D	L	GF	GA	GD	Pts	Qualification
1	ACA	West Ham United U23s (Q)	2	2	0	0	6	3	+3	6	Round 2
2	L2	Swindon Town (Q)	3	2	0	1	7	5	+2	6	Round 2
3	L1	Bristol Rovers (E)	3	1	0	2	8	8	0	3	
4	L2	Wycombe Wanderers (E)	2	0	0	2	1	6	−5	0	

Updated to match(es) played on 31 October 2017. Source: EFL.com
(E) Eliminated; (Q) Qualified for the phase indicated

29 August 2017 Group Game 1	Wycombe Wanderers	1–5	Bristol Rovers	High Wycombe
19:45 BST	Southwell 5'	Report	Telford 9' 42'; Broom 54' 85'; Sercombe 63'	Stadium: Adams Park; Attendance: 1,132; Referee: James Linington

31 October 2017 Group Game 2	Bristol Rovers	1–3	West Ham United U23s	Horfield
19:45 GMT	Nichols 1'; Burn (yellow card) 24'	Report	Martínez 43' (pen.), 76'; Samuelsen 50'	Stadium: Memorial Stadium; Attendance: 1,508

8 November 2017 Group Game 3	Bristol Rovers	2–4	Swindon Town	Horfield
19:45 GMT	Sweeney 26'; Sercombe 73'	Report	Goddard 17' (pen.); Mullin 37'; Gordon 58'; McDermott (yellow card) 70'; Woolery 87'	Stadium: Memorial Stadium; Attendance: 1,657; Referee: Andre Marriner

== Transfers ==
=== Transfers in ===
Date from	Position	Nationality	Name	From	Fee	Ref.
1 July 2017	DF	(Jordan)	Ghassan Abu Hassan	Free agent	Free	
1 July 2017	DF	(Wales)	Rollin Menayese	Weston-super-Mare	Free	
1 July 2017	CM	(England)	Liam Sercombe	Oxford United	Undisclosed	
6 July 2017	GK	(England)	Sam Slocombe	Blackpool	Free	
6 July 2017	GK	(England)	Adam Smith	Northampton Town	Free	
17 July 2017	CF	(England)	Tom Nichols	Peterborough United	Undisclosed	
19 July 2017	CB	(England)	Tom Broadbent	Hayes & Yeading United	Free	
18 August 2017	MF	(Germany)	Kenan Dünnwald	TSG Sprockhövel	Free	
18 August 2017	FW	(England)	Kunle Otudeko	Marlow	Free	
24 August 2017	FW	(Wales)	Rhys Kavanagh	Newport County	Compensation	
11 January 2018	FW	(England)	Bernard Mensah	Aldershot Town	Undisclosed	
1 February 2018	DF	(England)	Tony Craig	Millwall	Free transfer	
1 February 2018	MF	(England)	Kyle Bennett	Portsmouth	Free transfer	

=== Transfers out ===
Date from	Position	Nationality	Name	To	Fee	Ref.
1 July 2017	CB	(England)	Peter Hartley	Blackpool	Undisclosed	
1 July 2017	LM	(Colombia)	Cristian Montaño	Port Vale	Free	
3 January 2018	FW	(Wales)	Billy Bodin	Preston North End	Undisclosed	

=== Loans in ===
Start date	Position	Nationality	Name	From	End date	Ref.
14 July 2017	LB	(England)	Marc Bola	Arsenal	30 June 2018	
4 August 2017	CB	(Republic of Ireland)	Ryan Sweeney	Stoke City	30 June 2018	
4 August 2017	CF	(England)	Dom Telford	Stoke City	30 June 2018	

=== Loans out ===
Start date	Position	Nationality	Name	To	End date	Ref.
9 September 2017	GK	(Netherlands)	Thom Jonkerman	Mangotsfield United	7 October 2017	
25 October 2017	LB	(Germany)	Mohammad Baghdadi	Dorchester Town	28 December 2017	(Note: On 28 November, Mohammad Baghdadi's loan at Dorchester Town was extended by a further month.)
1 November 2017	CB	(Wales)	Ben Morgan	Frome Town	29 November 2017	
6 November 2017	DF	(England)	Sam Blake	Yate Town	4 December 2017	
6 November 2017	GK	(Netherlands)	Thom Jonkerman	Cirencester Town	4 December 2017	
23 November 2017	GK	(France)	Alexis André Jr.	Paulton Rovers	24 December 2017	
23 November 2017	CM	(England)	Charlie Ten-Grotenhuis	Paulton Rovers	24 December 2017	
28 November 2017	CB	(England)	Jonny Burn	York City	6 January 2018	
1 December 2017	MF	(England)	Josh Brace	Farnborough	Work experience	
1 December 2017	FW	(England)	Lewis Ellington	Farnborough	1 January 2018	
1 December 2017	FW	(Wales)	James Spruce	Cinderford Town	Work experience	
5 December 2017	GK	(England)	Liam Armstrong	Paulton Rovers	Work experience	
8 December 2017	LB	(Scotland)	Michael Kelly	Bath City	13 January 2018	
14 December 2017	CF	(England)	Rhys Kavanagh	Bath City	20 January 2018	
31 January 2018	DF	(Wales)	Rollin Menayese	Swindon Town	End of season	

== Squad statistics ==
Numbers in parentheses denote appearances as substitute.
Players with squad numbers struck through and marked † left the club during the playing season.
Players with names in italics and marked * were on loan from another club for the whole of their season with Bristol Rovers.
Players listed with no appearances have been in the matchday squad but only as unused substitutes.
Key to positions: GK – Goalkeeper; DF – Defender; MF – Midfielder; FW – Forward

No.	Pos.	Nat.	Name	Apps	Goals	Apps	Goals	Apps	Goals	Apps	Goals	Apps	Goals	Yellow card	Red card
No.	Pos.	Nat.	Name	League		FA Cup		EFL Cup		EFL Trophy		Total		Discipline	
1	GK	ENG	Sam Slocombe	11	0	0	0	2	0	2	0	15	0	1	1
2	DF	ENG	Daniel Leadbitter	14 (2)	0	0 (1)	0	2	0	1 (1)	0	17 (4)	0	3	0
3	DF	ENG	Lee Brown	21 (1)	1	1	0	2	0	0	0	24 (1)	1	2	0
4	DF	WAL	Tom Lockyer	24	1	1	0	3	0	0	0	28	1	2	1
5	DF	ENG	Jonny Burn	1	0	0	0	0	0	3	0	4	0	1	0
6	DF	IRL	Ryan Sweeney *	16 (4)	2	0	0	2	0	2	1	20 (4)	3	2	1
7	MF	ENG	Liam Sercombe	26 (2)	6	1	1	3	1	2	2	32 (2)	10	4	0
8	MF	ENG	Ollie Clarke	23 (3)	1	1	0	1	0	2	0	27 (3)	1	8	0
9	FW	WAL	Ellis Harrison	24 (3)	7	0 (1)	0	3	2	1	0	28 (4)	9	6	0
~~10~~ †	MF	WAL	Billy Bodin	20 (1)	9	0	0	3	2	0	0	23 (1)	11	1	0
11	FW	ENG	Tom Nichols	14 (14)	1	1	0	2 (1)	0	1 (1)	1	18 (16)	2	1	0
14	MF	ENG	Chris Lines	19 (6)	1	1	0	3	0	1	0	24 (6)	1	5	0
15	DF	ENG	James Clarke	1	0	0	0	0	0	0	0	1	0	0	0
16	DF	ENG	Tom Broadbent	12 (2)	0	1	0	1	0	1	0	15 (2)	0	3	0
17	MF	WAL	Ryan Broom	0 (2)	0	0	0	0 (1)	0	2	2	2 (3)	2	0	0
18	FW	ENG	Dom Telford *	0 (12)	1	0 (1)	0	0 (1)	0	3	2	3 (14)	3	4	0
19	MF	ENG	Byron Moore	3 (4)	0	0	0	1 (2)	0	3	0	7 (6)	0	1	0
20	DF	ENG	Marc Bola *	9 (1)	0	0	0	2	0	3	0	14 (1)	0	0	0
21	GK	ENG	Adam Smith	17	0	1	0	1	0	1	0	20	0	2	0
22	DF	WAL	Joe Partington	19 (1)	1	1	0	0 (2)	0	2	0	22 (3)	1	3	0
23	FW	ENG	Bernard Mensah	0 (1)	0	0	0	0	0	0	0	0 (1)	0	0	0
24	MF	ENG	Stuart Sinclair	16 (5)	2	1	1	2	0	1	0	20 (5)	3	3	0
30	FW	IRL	Rory Gaffney	16 (10)	6	1	0	0 (3)	0	1 (1)	0	18 (14)	6	2	0
31	DF	ENG	Alfie Kilgour	0	0	0	0	0	0	0	0	0	0	0	0
32	MF	ENG	Luke Russe	0	0	0	0	0	0	1 (1)	0	1 (1)	0	0	0
37	DF	WAL	Rollin Menayese	2	0	0	0	0	0	0 (1)	0	2 (1)	0	0	0
39	MF	ENG	Cameron Hargreaves	0	0	0	0	0	0	0 (2)	0	0 (2)	0	0	0
41	DF	SCO	Michael Kelly	0	0	0	0	0	0	0	0	0	0	0	0
44	GK	FRA	Alexis André Jr.	0 (1)	0	0	0	0	0	0	0	0 (1)	0	0	0
48	FW	ENG	Kunle Otudeko	0	0	0	0	0	0	0	0	0	0	0	0
49	MF	GER	Kenan Dünnwald	0 (1)	0	0	0	0	0	0 (1)	0	0 (2)	0	0	0
50	MF	ENG	James Spruce	0	0	0	0	0	0	0	0	0	0	0	0
51	FW	ENG	Rhys Kavanagh	0	0	0	0	0	0	0	0	0	0	0	0
