= Billy Bodin =

Footballer (born 1992)

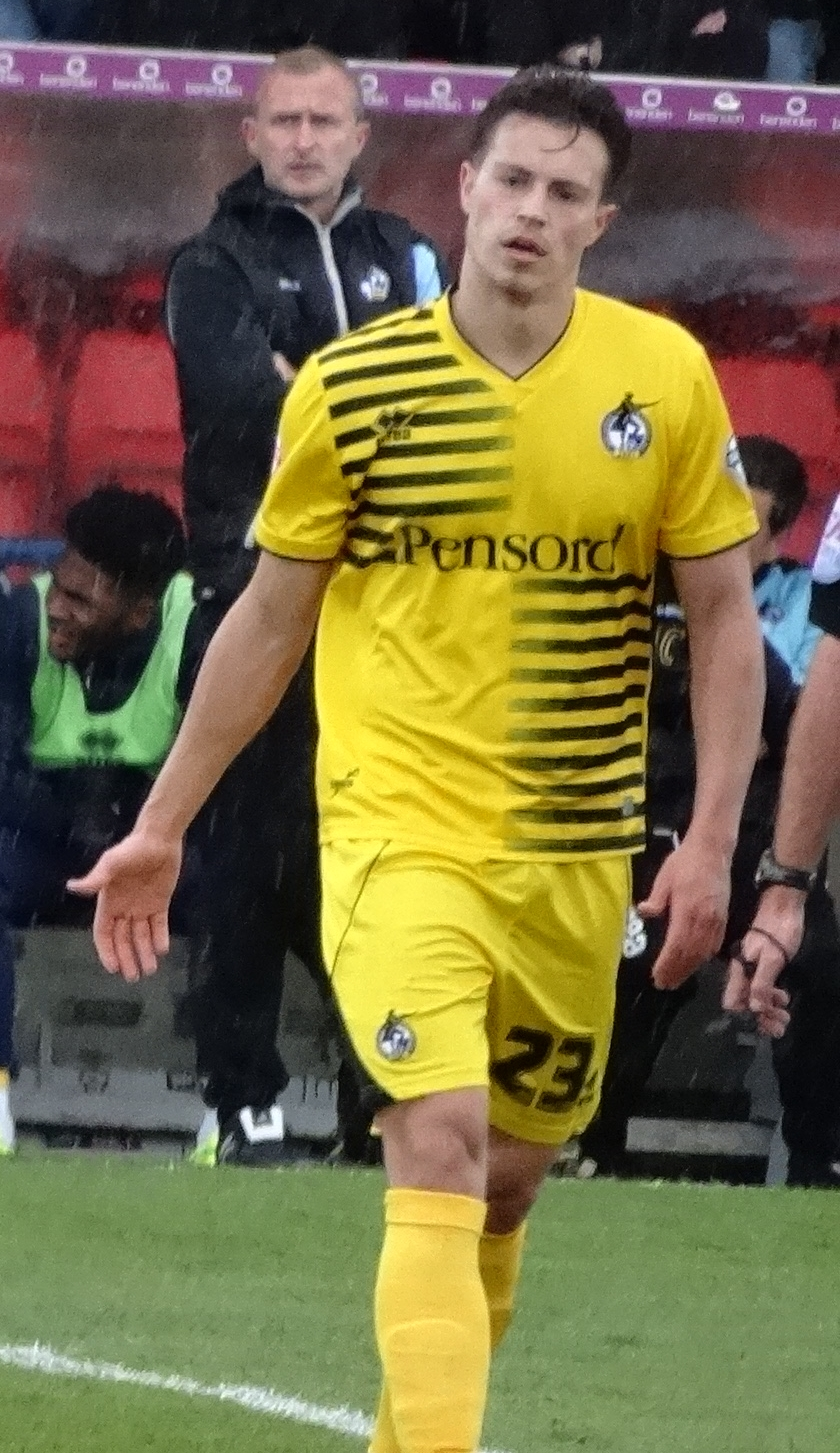
- Bodin playing for Bristol Rovers in 2016

Personal information
- Full name: Billy Paul Bodin
- Date of birth: 24 March 1992 (age 34)
- Place of birth: Swindon, England
- Height: 5 ft 11 in (1.80 m)
- Positions: Forward; right winger

Team information
- Current team: Gosport Borough

Youth career
- 2008–2010: Swindon Town

Senior career*
Years	Team	Apps	(Gls)
2010–2012	Swindon Town	16	(3)
2011–2012	→ Torquay United (loan)	17	(5)
2012	→ Crewe Alexandra (loan)	8	(0)
2012–2014	Torquay United	70	(6)
2015	Northampton Town	4	(0)
2015–2018	Bristol Rovers	95	(35)
2018–2021	Preston North End	39	(3)
2021–2024	Oxford United	89	(17)
2024–2025	Burton Albion	12	(4)
2025	→ Reading (loan)	16	(2)
2025–2026	Swindon Town	27	(4)
2026–	Gosport Borough	1	(1)

International career
2008–2009	Wales U17	14	(5)
2009–2010	Wales U19	9	(1)
2009–2014	Wales U21	21	(3)
2018	Wales	1	(0)
- * Club domestic league appearances and goals as of 16:19, 30 September 2026 (UTC)

Billy Paul Bodin (born 24 March 1992) is a professional footballer who plays as a forward or as an attacking midfielder for Southern League Premier Division South club Gosport Borough. Born in England, he played for the Wales national team. Bodin is the son of former Wales international Paul Bodin.

Bodin began his career with Swindon Town, spending periods on loan to Torquay United and Crewe Alexandra. After signing permanently and playing for two seasons at Torquay he spent a season at Northampton Town. He played for Bristol Rovers for two and a half years before joining Preston North End in January 2018, where he remained for a further three seasons.

Having represented Wales at several youth levels, he was called up to the Wales senior squad for the first time on 15 March 2018.

== Club career ==
=== Swindon Town ===
Bodin began his career with Swindon Town, moving from the youth set-up, where he finished top scorer in both the youth side and the reserves during the 2009–10 season, to become a professional in April 2010. Bodin was an unused substitute on the Swindon bench on 20 March 2010 in their 1–1 league draw against Norwich City.

On 2 October 2010, Bodin followed in his father's footsteps by making his first-team debut for Swindon Town as a late substitute in a 2–1 League One defeat to Dagenham & Redbridge, replacing Thomas Dossevi. Swindon were relegated to League Two after finishing 24th, and Bodin expressed hopes for first-team opportunities the following season.

Having returning to Swindon in early January 2012 from a loan spell, Bodin scored his first goals for the club, the final goal in a 4–1 victory over Southend United on 31 January 2012 and another in the next game, a 3–0 win over Crawley Town on 14 February 2012. His third goal came against Dagenham & Redbridge in a 4–0 win on 6 March 2012.

=== Torquay United (loan) ===
On 25 August 2011, Bodin joined Torquay United on loan until January 2012. He made his Torquay debut in a 1–1 draw with Dagenham & Redbridge on 27 August 2011, coming on as a substitute and winning a penalty, which was converted by Rene Howe. On 13 September 2011, he scored his first goal for the club in a 2–2 draw against Cheltenham Town, and he scored again the following week in a 3–3 draw against Rotherham United. His next goal came on 29 October 2015 in a 1–0 win over Hereford United, and he scored again on 5 November 2011 in a 3–0 win over Crewe. After his goal against Hereford United, manager Martin Ling predicted big things for Bodin since becoming established in the first team. On 2 January 2012, Bodin scored his 6th goal in a 2–1 win over Plymouth Argyle. Bodin's good performances led Torquay unsuccessfully to seek a loan extension until the end of the season. After leaving Torquay, Bodin paid tribute to Ling, crediting his tactical changes with stopping the club's nosedive at the start of the season.

=== Crewe Alexandra (loan) ===
In March 2012, he was loaned to Crewe Alexandra for the remainder of the season. Bodin made his debut for the club in a 1–0 win over Hereford United on 24 March 2012.

=== Torquay United ===
On 2 July 2012, Torquay United signed Bodin for an undisclosed fee believed to be around £70,000, beating Crewe who had also attempted to sign him. Bodin suffered knee ligament damage whilst playing for Torquay against Dagenham & Redbridge in April 2014. His contract expired during the summer of 2014.

=== Northampton Town ===
In January 2015, Bodin joined Northampton Town on a deal until the end of the season having spent time at the club during his knee ligament injury rehabilitation. Bodin made four substitute appearances for the Cobblers before leaving in the summer.

=== Bristol Rovers ===
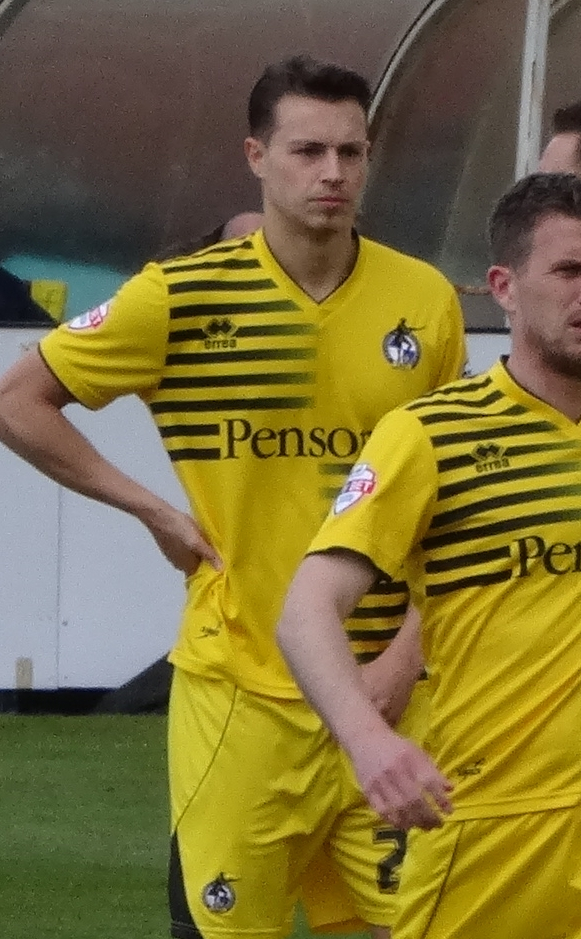
Bodin playing for Bristol Rovers in 2016

==== 2015–16 season ====
Bodin went on to sign for Bristol Rovers in July 2015 on a short-term deal, following a successful trial at the club. He scored his first goal for Rovers in a 3–0 away win against Hartlepool, his second against Morecambe in a 4–3 win away from home, and his third, a spectacular effort, in a 1–4 loss to Newport County. He also scored against Dagenham & Redbridge and high-flying Plymouth Argyle, to finish the season with 5 goals, helping his side to achieve promotion to Football League One. On 9 June 2016 he signed a new two-year deal to stay at Rovers.

==== 2016–17 season ====
Bodin did not score in the 2016–17 season until a volley in a 3–2 defeat to Chesterfield in November. By the turn of the year he was on four goals, thanks to a Boxing Day hat trick in a 4–1 victory over Coventry City, all scored with his left foot: a shot from the edge of the box into the far top corner, a long shot from 25 yards and a penalty. He scored a fine goal against Northampton Town during a 5–0 thrashing, but it was overshadowed by teammate Ellis Harrison's four.

==== 2017–18 season ====
Bodin scored his first two goals of the season with a brace on 8 August 2017, in a 4–1 EFL Cup victory over Cambridge United, his second match of the campaign. His first two league goals of the season came in a 3–2 victory away to Bury: a header from a cross from Joe Partington to make it 2–0 and a close-range effort to make it 3–0. On 7 October 2017, Bodin opened the scoring as Rovers defeated his former club Northampton 6–0 away from home; however, in doing so he suffered an injury that kept him out of the team for over a month.

Bodin departed Bristol Rovers on 3 January 2018, having scored 13 goals in the first half of the season for the club.

=== Preston North End ===
On 3 January 2018, Bodin joined EFL Championship club Preston North End for an undisclosed fee, signing a two-and-a-half-year contract with the club. He was assigned shirt number 39 on his arrival at Deepdale. He made his debut on 6 January 2018 in a 5–1 victory away at Wycombe Wanderers in the FA Cup 3rd round. The injury problems that had plagued Bodin in the earlier part of his career returned during his time at Preston and he missed the entirety of the 2018–19 season with an anterior cruciate ligament injury.

In October 2019 he signed a new contract with PNE until summer 2021. On 13 May 2021, it was confirmed that Bodin would be leaving the club at the end of his contract.

=== Oxford United ===
On 30 June 2021, Bodin signed for EFL League One side Oxford United as a free agent on a one-year contract. In his first season, in which Oxford narrowly missed out on a play-off place, he scored six times in the league and once in the FA Cup. He expressed his wish to sign a new contract at the end of the season, and in June 2022 signed a new two-year deal.

After winning promotion to the Championship with Oxford, Bodin announced he would leave the club at the end of the 2023–24 season when his contract expired.

=== Burton Albion ===
On 8 July 2024, Bodin returned to League One following his release from Oxford United, joining Burton Albion on a two-year deal.

==== Reading (loan) ====
On 3 February 2025, Bodin joined Reading on loan until the end of the season.

=== Return to Swindon Town ===
On 21 July 2025, following the termination of his contract with Burton Albion, Bodin returned to his first professional club Swindon Town, signing a one-year deal.

He was released upon the expiry of his one-year deal at the end of the 2025–26 season.

=== Gosport Borough ===
On 30 September 2026, Bodin joined Southern League Premier Division South club Gosport Borough.

== International career ==
Bodin is eligible to play for Wales as his father, Paul Bodin, was born in Cardiff and earned 23 caps for the senior team between 1990 and 1994. Billy Bodin has represented Wales at Under-17, Under-19 and Under-21 level. In January 2013 he was selected in the Wales U21 squad for the friendly match against Iceland on 6 February 2013

He was called into the Welsh senior squad for the first time on 15 March 2018. He made his debut on 26 March 2018, coming on as a 67th-minute substitute in the China Cup 1–0 final defeat to Uruguay.

== Personal life ==
His father, Paul Bodin, is a former professional footballer.

== Career statistics ==
=== Club ===
As of end of 2025–26 season

Appearances and goals by club, season and competition
Club	Season	League			FA Cup		League Cup		Other		Total	
Club	Season	Division	Apps	Goals	Apps	Goals	Apps	Goals	Apps	Goals	Apps	Goals
Swindon Town	2010–11	League One	5	0	0	0	0	0	0	0	5	0
Swindon Town	2011–12	League Two	11	3	0	0	0	0	0	0	11	3
Swindon Town	Total		16	3	0	0	0	0	0	0	16	3
Torquay United (loan)	2011–12	League Two	17	5	1	0	0	0	1 (Note: Appearances in the Football League Trophy)	0	19	5
Crewe Alexandra (loan)	2011–12	League Two	8	0	0	0	0	0	1 (Note: Appearance in the League Two play-offs)	0	9	0
Torquay United	2012–13	League Two	43	5	1	0	0	0	1	0	45	5
Torquay United	2013–14	League Two	27	1	0	0	1	0	0	0	28	1
Torquay United	Total		70	6	1	0	1	0	1	0	73	6
Northampton Town	2014–15	League Two	4	0	0	0	0	0	0	0	4	0
Bristol Rovers	2015–16	League Two	38	13	1	0	0	0	2	0	41	13
Bristol Rovers	2016–17	League One	36	13	2	0	2	0	2	0	42	13
Bristol Rovers	2017–18	League One	21	9	0	0	3	2	0	0	24	11
Bristol Rovers	Total		95	35	3	0	5	2	4	0	107	37
Preston North End	2017–18	Championship	17	1	1	0	0	0	0	0	18	1
Preston North End	2018–19	Championship	0	0	0	0	0	0	0	0	0	0
Preston North End	2019–20	Championship	18	2	2	1	1	0	0	0	21	3
Preston North End	2020–21	Championship	4	0	0	0	1	0	0	0	5	0
Preston North End	Total		39	3	2	1	2	0	0	0	44	4
Oxford United	2021–22	League One	21	6	2	1	1	0	1	0	25	7
Oxford United	2022–23	League One	32	6	3	3	2	0	3	0	40	9
Oxford United	2023–24	League One	36	5	3	3	1	1	1	0	41	9
Oxford United	Total		89	17	8	7	4	1	4	0	102	25
Burton Albion	2024–25	League One	10	4	1	0	1	0	1	0	13	4
Reading (loan)	2024–25	League One	16	2	0	0	0	0	0	0	16	2
Swindon Town	2025–26	League Two	27	4	2	0	1	0	4	0	34	4
Career total			376	77	19	8	14	3	16	0	425	88

=== International ===
Appearances and goals by national team and year
National team	Year	Apps	Goals
Wales	2018	1	0

== Honours ==
Swindon Town

- Football League Two: 2011–12

Crewe Alexandra

- Football League Two play-offs: 2012

Bristol Rovers

- Football League Two third-place promotion: 2015–16

Oxford United

- EFL League One play-offs: 2024
