= Bernard Mensah (footballer, born December 1994) =

English footballer

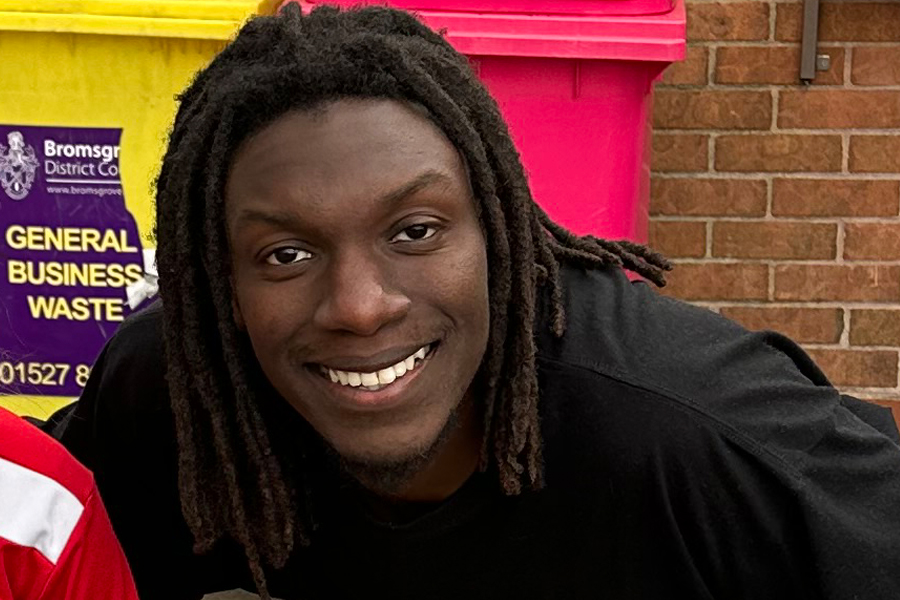
- Mensah with Redditch United in April 2023

Personal information
- Full name: Bernard Ayitey Mensah Jnr
- Date of birth: 29 December 1994 (age 31)
- Place of birth: Hounslow, London, England
- Position: Striker

Youth career
- 2011–2013: Watford

Senior career*
Years	Team	Apps	(Gls)
2013–2016	Watford	2	(0)
2014	→ Braintree Town (loan)	9	(2)
2014–2015	→ Barnet (loan)	8	(1)
2015	→ Braintree Town (loan)	13	(1)
2016–2018	Aldershot Town	56	(14)
2018–2020	Bristol Rovers	9	(0)
2018–2019	→ Lincoln City (loan)	4	(0)
2019	→ Aldershot Town (loan)	16	(4)
2019–2020	→ Maidenhead United (loan)	25	(1)
2020–2022	Gloucester City	39	(6)
2022	→ Redditch United (loan)	4	(1)
2022–2023	Redditch United	39	(10)
2023	Uxbridge	11	(5)
Total		234	(45)
- * Club domestic league appearances and goals as of 17:58, 25 August 2026 (UTC)

Bernard Ayitey Mensah Jnr (born 29 December 1994) is an English former footballer who played as a striker.

== Club career ==
=== Watford ===
Mensah was named in April 2011 as one of a group of seven young players who would take up a two-year scholarship with Watford at the start of the 2011–12 season. In July 2011, Mensah signed a professional contract that would activate on his 17th birthday and keep him at the club until the end of the 2013–14 season. Later on that year, Mensah had surgery on his knee, ruling him out of playing contention for the remainder of the season.

In January 2013, Mensah signed an extension to his contract, committing to Watford until 2016. He scored 14 goals in 19 appearances for the under-18 side during the 2012–13 season before becoming a full professional at the end of the campaign.

On 23 November 2013, Mensah made his Watford debut as a 78th-minute substitute for Javier Acuña against Bolton Wanderers.

On 10 January 2014, Mensah joined Conference side Braintree Town on a one-month loan. Due to bad weather which limited his playing time, Mensah's loan was extended for a further month until 16 March. Mensah again extended his loan at Braintree Town, this time until the end of the season on 11 March 2014.

On 6 November 2014, Mensah joined Barnet on loan until 5 January 2015.

Mensah re-joined Braintree on loan on 11 February 2015 until the end of the 2014–15 season.

On 3 June 2016, it was announced that Mensah would leave Watford upon his contract expiry.

=== Aldershot Town ===
On 10 June 2016, Mensah joined National League side Aldershot Town on a one-year deal, which was renewed at the end of the season until June 2018

=== Bristol Rovers ===
On 11 January 2018, Mensah joined League one side Bristol Rovers for an undisclosed fee. He made his first appearance for the club as an 80th-minute substitute in their 3–1 win against Bradford City on 20 January 2018. After loan spells at Lincoln City and a return to Aldershot in the 2018–19 season, Mensah joined Maidenhead United on a season-long loan in July 2019.

=== Gloucester City ===
In January 2020, Mensah's loan spell with Maidenhead was terminated early and he joined Gloucester City permanently on an 18-month contract for an undisclosed fee. On 2 February 2021, Mensah signed a new contract with the National League North leaders that would keep him at the club until 2023.

On 12 February 2022, Mensah joined Redditch United on a one-month loan. At the end of the 2021–22 season, Mensah was placed on the transfer list having been told he would not be part of manager Lee Mansell's plans for the following season.

=== Redditch United ===
On 1 July 2022, Mensah returned to Redditch United.

=== Uxbridge ===
On 3 August 2023, Mensah joined Isthmian League South Central Division club Uxbridge.

In November 2023, Mensah suffered a serious knee injury in a defeat to Guernsey.

== International career ==
Mensah is eligible to play for Ghana or England but has yet to represent either country at any level.

In 2011, Mensah trained with the Ghana squad ahead of their friendly against Nigeria at Vicarage Road. However, he was not called up by Ghana and was asked to join the squad for training due to their depleted squad.

== Career statistics ==
As of match played 25 November 2023

Appearances and goals by club, season and competition
Club	Season	League			FA Cup		League Cup		Other		Total	
Club	Season	Division	Apps	Goals	Apps	Goals	Apps	Goals	Apps	Goals	Apps	Goals
Watford	2013–14	Championship	1	0	0	0	0	0	—		1	0
Watford	2014–15	Championship	1	0	0	0	0	0	—		1	0
Watford	2015–16	Premier League	0	0	0	0	0	0	—		0	0
Watford	Total		2	0	0	0	0	0	0	0	2	0
Braintree Town (loan)	2013–14	Conference Premier	9	2	0	0	—		0	0	9	2
Barnet (loan)	2014–15	Conference Premier	8	1	1	0	—		2 (Note: Appearances in the FA Trophy)	1	11	2
Braintree Town (loan)	2014–15	Conference Premier	13	1	0	0	—		0	0	13	1
Aldershot Town	2016–17	National League	42	10	1	0	—		4 (Note: Two appearances and two goals in the FA Trophy; two appearances and a goal in the National League play-offs)	3	47	13
Aldershot Town	2017–18	National League	14	4	2	0	—		1	0	17	4
Aldershot Town	Total		55	14	3	0	—		5	3	63	17
Bristol Rovers	2017–18	League One	8	0	—		0	0	—		8	0
Bristol Rovers	2018-19	League One	1	0	0	0	0	0	0	0	1	0
Bristol Rovers	Total		9	0	0	0	0	0	0	0	9	0
Lincoln City (loan)	2018-19	League Two	4	0	0	0	0	0	4 (Note: Four appearances in the EFL Trophy)	0	8	0
Aldershot Town (loan)	2018-19	National League	16	4	—		—		0	0	16	4
Maidenhead United (loan)	2019-20	National League	25	1	2	0	—		2	0	29	1
Gloucester City	2019–20	National League North	6	3	0	0	—		0	0	6	3
Gloucester City	2020–21	National League North	14	3	1	0	—		2	1	17	4
Gloucester City	2021–22	National League North	19	0	0	0	—		0	0	19	0
Gloucester City	Total		39	6	1	0	0	0	2	1	42	7
Redditch United (loan)	2021–22	SL Premier Division Central	4	1	0	0	—		0	0	4	1
Redditch United	2022–23	SL Premier Division Central	39	10	3	3	—		7 (Note: Three appearances and two goals in FA Trophy, two appearances in Worcestershire Senior Cup, two appearances in Birmingham Senior Cup)	2	49	15
Uxbridge	2023–24	Isthmian League South Central Division	11	5	4	2	—		1	0	16	7
Career total			234	45	14	5	0	0	23	7	272	57
