= 2018–19 Bristol Rovers F.C. season =

Bristol Rovers
2018–19 season
- President: Wael al-Qadi
- Chairman: Steve Hamer
- Manager: Darrell Clarke (until 13 December); Graham Coughlan (from 6 January)
- Stadium: Memorial Stadium
- League One: 15th
- FA Cup: First round (Vs. Barnet)
- EFL Cup: Second round (Vs. Queens Park Rangers)
- EFL Trophy: Semi-final (Vs. Sunderland)
- Highest home attendance: 10,009 vs. Sunderland (23 February 2019)
- Lowest home attendance: 1,021 vs. West Ham United U21 (18 September 2018, EFL Trophy group stage)
- Average home league attendance: 8,320
- Biggest win: 4–0 vs. Blackpool (2 March 2019)
- Biggest defeat: 0–4 vs. Doncaster Rovers (8 December 2018)
Home colours	Away colours	Third colours

The 2018–19 Bristol Rovers F.C. season was the 136th season in Bristol Rovers F.C. history and their 91st in the English Football League. Rovers contested in the third tier of English football, League One as well as three cup competitions, FA Cup, EFL Cup and EFL Trophy.

== Transfers ==
=== Transfers in ===
Date from	Position	Nationality	Name	From	Fee	Ref.
1 July 2018	CM	(England)	Sam Matthews	AFC Bournemouth	Free transfer	
1 July 2018	CM	(England)	Ed Upson	Milton Keynes Dons	Free transfer	
2 July 2018	LW	(England)	Alex Rodman	Shrewsbury Town	Free transfer	
2 July 2018	CM	(England)	Theo Widdrington	Portsmouth	Free transfer	
3 July 2018	CF	(Scotland)	Gavin Reilly	(Scotland) St Mirren	Free transfer	
23 July 2018	LB	(England)	Tareiq Holmes-Dennis	Huddersfield Town	Undisclosed	
9 August 2018	CF	(England)	Stefan Payne	Shrewsbury Town	Undisclosed	
24 August 2018	CF	(England)	Deon Moore	Merstham	Undisclosed	
31 January 2019	DM	(England)	Abu Ogogo	Coventry City	Free transfer	
1 February 2019	CF	(England)	Jonson Clarke-Harris	Coventry City	Undisclosed	

=== Transfers out ===
Date from	Position	Nationality	Name	To	Fee	Ref.
1 July 2018	RM	(Wales)	Ryan Broom	Cheltenham Town	Released	
1 July 2018	LB	(England)	Lee Brown	Portsmouth	Mutual consent	
1 July 2018	CB	(England)	Jonny Burn	Free agent	Released	
1 July 2018	CF	(Germany)	Kenan Dünnwald	(Germany) 1. FC Kaan-Marienborn	Released	
1 July 2018	CF	(Republic of Ireland)	Rory Gaffney	Salford City	Undisclosed	
1 July 2018	RW	(England)	Byron Moore	Bury	Released	
23 July 2018	CF	(Wales)	Ellis Harrison	Ipswich Town	Undisclosed	
7 September 2018	GK	(Netherlands)	Thom Jonkerman	(Netherlands) FC Lienden	Free transfer	
18 January 2019	CB	(England)	Tom Broadbent	Swindon Town	Undisclosed	
25 January 2019	LB	(Germany)	Mohammad Baghdadi	(Germany) Eintracht Norderstedt 03	Mutual consent	

=== Loans in ===
Start date	Position	Nationality	Name	From	End date	Ref.
9 August 2018	CF	(Scotland)	Alex Jakubiak	Watford	31 May 2019	
27 August 2018	GK	(Republic of Ireland)	Jack Bonham	Brentford	31 May 2019	
29 August 2018	LB	(England)	Joe Martin	Stevenage	1 January 2019	
29 January 2019	CB	(England)	Gabriel Osho	Reading	31 May 2019	

=== Loans out ===
Start date	Position	Nationality	Name	To	End date	Ref.
8 August 2018	FW	(England)	Cameron Allen	Dorchester Town	September 2018	
21 August 2018	GK	(England)	Sam Slocombe	Lincoln City	9 January 2019	
31 August 2018	CF	(England)	Bernard Mensah	Lincoln City	20 January 2019	
7 September 2018	DF	(England)	Josh Bailey	Dorchester Town	October 2018	
26 October 2018	CF	(England)	Harry Warwick	Gloucester City	Work experience	
2 November 2018	MF	(England)	Lewis Leigh-Gilchrist	Truro City	December 2018	
7 November 2018	CB	(England)	Alfie Kilgour	Maidenhead United	6 January 2019	
16 November 2018	CF	(England)	Cameron Allen	Tiverton Town	December 2018	
16 November 2018	LB	(Germany)	Mohammad Baghdadi	Bath City	December 2018	
16 November 2018	CF	(England)	Deon Moore	Bath City	December 2018	
21 December 2018	CM	(England)	Theo Widdrington	Bognor Regis Town	January 2019	
21 January 2019	RW	(England)	Bernard Mensah	Aldershot Town	31 May 2019	
25 January 2019	MF	(England)	Luke Russe	Gloucester City	31 May 2019	
31 January 2019	LW	(England)	Kyle Bennett	Swindon Town	31 May 2019	
31 January 2019	DF	(Wales)	Ben Morgan	Salisbury	31 May 2019	
31 January 2019	CF	(England)	Stefan Payne	Shrewsbury Town	31 May 2019	
1 February 2019	CB	(Wales)	Rollin Menayese	Aldershot Town	31 May 2019	
8 February 2019	CM	(England)	Theo Widdrington	Bognor Regis Town	31 May 2019	
20 February 2019	GK	(France)	Alexis André Jr.	Yate Town	March 2019	
21 March 2019	CM	(England)	Sam Matthews	Eastleigh	31 May 2019	
28 March 2019	GK	(Morocco)	Alexis André Jr.	Truro City	31 May 2019	
28 March 2019	CF	(England)	Harry Warwick	Truro City	31 May 2019	

== Competitions ==
=== Pre-Season friendlies ===
As of 12 June 2018, Bristol Rovers have announced four pre-season friendlies against Eerste Divisie side FC Eindhoven, Yeovil Town and Forest Green Rovers of EFL League Two, and newly promoted Southern League side Melksham Town.

14 July 2018 Friendly	Melksham Town	0–6	Bristol Rovers	Melksham
15:00 BST		Report	Kauppinen 3'; Bennett 22', 42'; Nichols 24'; Harrison 55', 57'	Stadium: Oakfields Stadium

17 July 2018 Friendly	Yeovil Town	1–1	Bristol Rovers	Yeovil
19:45 BST	Mugabi 57'	Report	Lockyer 27'	Stadium: Huish Park

21 July 2018 Friendly	Forest Green Rovers	1–0	Bristol Rovers	Nailsworth
15:00 BST	Doidge 7' (pen.)	Report		Stadium: The New Lawn; Attendance: 1,235

25 July 2018 Friendly	FC Eindhoven	0–2	Bristol Rovers	Leende
19:00 CEST		Report	Clarke 35'; Bennett 88'	Stadium: DOSL Sports Park

28 July 2018 Friendly	Bristol Rovers	0–4	Exeter City	Horfield
15:00 BST		Report	Forte; Moxey; Boateng; Brown	Stadium: Memorial Stadium; Attendance: 1,796

=== League One ===
==== League table ====
Pos	Team	Pld	W	D	L	GF	GA	GD	Pts
13	Gillingham	46	15	10	21	61	72	−11	55
14	Accrington Stanley	46	14	13	19	51	67	−16	55
15	Bristol Rovers	46	13	15	18	47	50	−3	54
16	Rochdale	46	15	9	22	54	87	−33	54
17	Wycombe Wanderers	46	14	11	21	55	67	−12	53

Source: EFL Official Website
Rules for classification: 1) Points; 2) Goal difference; 3) Number of goals scored; 4) Head-to-head results

==== Results summary ====
Overall								Home						Away					
Pld	W	D	L	GF	GA	GD	Pts	W	D	L	GF	GA	GD	W	D	L	GF	GA	GD
46	13	15	18	47	50	−3	54	6	6	11	24	28	−4	7	9	7	23	22	+1

Last updated: 4 May 2019.
Source: BBC

==== Results by matchday ====
Matchday	1	2	3	4	5	6	7	8	9	10	11	12	13	14	15	16	17	18	19	20	21	22	23	24	25	26	27	28	29	30	31	32	33	34	35	36	37	38	39	40	41	42	43	44	45	46
Ground	A	H	A	H	H	A	H	A	H	A	A	H	A	H	H	A	A	H	A	H	H	A	H	A	A	H	A	H	H	A	H	A	H	H	A	A	H	A	A	H	A	H	A	H	A	H
Result	L	L	W	L	L	D	D	L	W	D	D	L	L	D	W	L	W	L	L	L	L	L	W	W	W	D	D	L	D	W	D	D	L	W	W	W	D	D	L	L	D	W	D	L	D	W
Position	15	21	16	19	20	21	20	22	17	18	18	21	21	20	19	20	20	21	21	21	21	23	22	20	19	19	20	22	23	20	19	19	21	21	19	16	14	15	15	16	16	14	14	16	16	15

Updated to match(es) played on 4 May 2019. Source: Statto.com
A = Away; H = Home; W = Win; D = Draw; L = Loss

==== Matches ====
On 21 June 2018, the League One fixtures for the forthcoming season were announced.

4 August 2018 1	Peterborough United	2–1	Bristol Rovers	Peterborough
15:00 BST	Matt Godden 1'; Mark O'Hara 26'	Report	Tom Lockyer 90+3'	Stadium: ABAX Stadium; Attendance: 6,439; Referee: John Busby

11 August 2018 2	Bristol Rovers	1–2	Accrington Stanley	Horfield
15:00 BST	Payne 83'	Report	McConville 6', 89'	Stadium: The Memorial Stadium; Attendance: 8,683; Referee: Nick Kinseley

18 August 2018 3	Wycombe Wanderers	1–2	Bristol Rovers	High Wycombe
15:00 BST	Kashket 82'	Report	J Clarke 4'; Craig 20'	Stadium: Adams Park; Attendance: 4,858; Referee: Kevin Johnson

21 August 2018 4	Bristol Rovers	1–2	Portsmouth	Horfield
19:45 BST	Lines 76' (pen.) (red card) 78'	Report	Evans 32'; Curtis 87'	Stadium: The Memorial Stadium; Attendance: 9,073; Referee: Graham Salisbury

25 August 2018 5	Bristol Rovers	0–1	Southend United	Horfield
15:00 BST		Report	Hopper 40'	Stadium: The Memorial Stadium; Attendance: 8,172; Referee: Ross Joyce

1 September 2018 6	Shrewsbury Town	1–1	Bristol Rovers	Shrewsbury
15:00 BST	Leadbitter 73' (o.g.)	Report	Payne 53' (pen.); Martin (yellow card) 20' (yellow-red card) 59'	Stadium: New Meadow; Attendance: 5,759; Referee: Antony Coggins

8 September 2018 7	Bristol Rovers	0–0	Plymouth Argyle	Horfield
13:30 BST		Report		Stadium: Memorial Stadium; Attendance: 9,006; Referee: Michael Salisbury

15 September 2018 8	Luton Town	1–0	Bristol Rovers	Luton
15:00 BST	Andrew Shinnie 62'	Report		Stadium: Kenilworth Road; Attendance: 8,912; Referee: Robert Lewis

22 September 2018 9	Bristol Rovers	3–1	Coventry City	Horfield
15:00 BST	Reilly 7'; Lockyer 19'; O Clarke 23'	Report	Hyam 44'	Stadium: Memorial Stadium; Attendance: 8,385; Referee: Thomas Bramall

29 September 2018 10	Bradford City	0–0	Bristol Rovers	Bradford
15:00 BST		Report		Stadium: Valley Parade; Attendance: 15,916; Referee: Ollie Yates

2 October 2018 11	Rochdale	0–0	Bristol Rovers	Rochdale
19:45 BST	Norman (red card) 45+2'	Report		Stadium: Spotland Stadium; Attendance: 2,301; Referee: Matt Donohue

6 October 2018 12	Bristol Rovers	0–1	Walsall	Horfield
15:00 BST		Report	Leahy (yellow card) 8'; Ginnelly (yellow card) 43'; Morris 90+4'	Stadium: Memorial Stadium; Attendance: 7,768; Referee: Lee Swabey

13 October 2018 13	Burton Albion	1–0	Bristol Rovers	Burton upon Trent
19:45 BST	Fraser (yellow card) 40'; Fox 90+1'	Report	Partington (yellow card) 31'; O. Clarke (yellow card) 74'	Stadium: Pirelli Stadium; Attendance: 3,171; Referee: Martin Coy

20 October 2018 14	Bristol Rovers	0–0	Oxford United	Horfield
15:00 BST	Craig (yellow card) 16'; Lockyer (yellow card) 21'; Jakubiak (yellow card) 45'	Report	Browne (yellow card) 26'; Mackie (yellow card) 41'	Stadium: Memorial Stadium; Attendance: 8,506; Referee: Tom Nield

23 October 2018 15	Bristol Rovers	2–0	AFC Wimbledon	Horfield
19:45 BST	Upson 35'; Nightingale 53' (o.g.)	Report		Stadium: Memorial Stadium; Attendance: 7,184; Referee: Andy Woolmer

27 October 2018 16	Barnsley	1–0	Bristol Rovers	Barnsley
15:00 BST	Mowatt 11', (yellow card) 45'; Moncur (yellow card) 39'; Davies (yellow card) 90'	Report	Kelly (yellow card) 79'	Stadium: Oakwell; Attendance: 10,966; Referee: Anthony Backhouse

3 November 2018 17	Blackpool	0–3	Bristol Rovers	Blackpool
15:00 GMT		Report	O. Clarke 48', 85'; Upson (yellow card) 70'; Craig 77'	Stadium: Bloomfield Road; Attendance: Trevor Kettle; Referee: 3,227

17 November 2018 18	Bristol Rovers	1–2	Scunthorpe United	Horfield
15:00 GMT	Sercombe 45+2'	Report	Novak 15'; Lund 78'	Stadium: Memorial Stadium; Attendance: 8,003; Referee: Lee Collins

24 November 2018 19	Charlton Athletic	3–1	Bristol Rovers	Charlton
15:00 GMT	Ward 10'; Aribo 45'; Grant 90+4'	Report	Martin 30'	Stadium: The Valley; Attendance: 10,328; Referee: Matthew Donohue

27 November 2018 20	Bristol Rovers	1–2	Gillingham	Horfield
19:45 GMT	Sercombe 87'	Report	List 8'; Reilly 59' (red card) 70'	Stadium: Memorial Stadium; Attendance: 6,983; Referee: Ollie Yates

8 December 2018 21	Bristol Rovers	0–4	Doncaster Rovers	Horfield
15:00 GMT		Report	John Marquis 10'; Malik Wilks 43' 59'; James Coppinger (yellow card) 45'; Tom Anderson 54'	Stadium: Memorial Stadium; Attendance: 7,356; Referee: John Busby

15 December 2018 22	Sunderland	2–1	Bristol Rovers	Sunderland
15:00 GMT	Matthews 45+1' (yellow card) 90+5'; Maja 49'; Honeyman (yellow card) 57'; Gooch (yellow card) 83'	Report	Rodman 11'; Upson (yellow card) 36'; Kelly (yellow card) 84'; Clarke (yellow card) 90+6'	Stadium: Stadium of Light; Attendance: 28,971; Referee: Thomas Bramall

22 December 2018 23	Bristol Rovers	2–1	Fleetwood Town	Horfield
15:00 GMT	O. Clarke (yellow card) 23'; Reilly 36'; Lines (yellow card) 90+3'; J. Clarke 90+4', (yellow card) 90+6'	Report	Hunter 28', (yellow card) 41'; Evans (yellow card) 43' (yellow-red card) 55'; Holt (yellow card) 46'; Madden (yellow card) 60'; Marney (yellow card) 64'; Wallace (yellow card) 80'; Coyle (yellow card) 90+8'	Stadium: Memorial Stadium; Attendance: 7,159; Referee: Brett Huxtable

26 December 2018 24	Walsall	1–3	Bristol Rovers	Walsall
15:00 GMT	Gordon 45'; Leahy (yellow card) 72'	Report	Lockyer 7'; Rodman 10'; Holmes-Dennis (yellow card) 40'; Reilly (yellow card) 43'; Holmes-Dennis 52'	Stadium: Bescot Stadium; Attendance: 5069; Referee: Robert Lewis

29 December 2018 25	Oxford United	0–2	Bristol Rovers	Oxford
13:00 GMT		Report	Jakubiak 15', 63'; Clarke (yellow card) 45+2'; Kelly (yellow card) 83'	Stadium: Kassam Stadium; Attendance: 8,135; Referee: Graham Salisbury

1 January 2019 26	Bristol Rovers	0–0	Burton Albion	Horfield
15:00 GMT	Sinclair (yellow card) 47'	Report		Stadium: Memorial Stadium; Attendance: 9,060; Referee: Scott Oldham

12 January 2019 27	Accrington Stanley	0–0	Bristol Rovers	Accrington
15:00 GMT	Sykes (yellow card) 90+2'	Report	Clarke (yellow card) 89'	Stadium: Crown Ground; Attendance: 2,246; Referee: Alan Young

19 January 2019 28	Bristol Rovers	0–1	Wycombe Wanderers	Horfield
15:00 GMT	Payne (yellow card) 22'; Clarke (yellow card) 76'; Rodman (yellow card) 90+1'	Report	Thompson (yellow card) 50'; Jombati 57'; Freeman (yellow card) 63'	Stadium: Memorial Stadium; Attendance: 8,163; Referee: Ben Toner

29 January 2019 29	Bristol Rovers	2–2	Peterborough United	Horfield
19:45 GMT	Nichols 8' (pen.); Clarke 43'	Report	Toney 37'; Tomlin (yellow card) 56'; Ward 90'	Stadium: Memorial Stadium; Attendance: 6,851; Referee: Lee Collins

2 February 2019 30	Southend United	1–2	Bristol Rovers	Southend-on-Sea
15:00 GMT	Turner (yellow card) 34'; Cox 39'; Hart (yellow card) 58'; Yearwood (yellow card) 62'	Report	Sercombe 20'; Reilly 32'; Nichols (yellow card) 45+2'; Clarke (yellow card) 74'; Partington (yellow card) 85'; Clarke-Harris (yellow card) 90+1'	Stadium: Roots Hall; Attendance: 5,982; Referee: Oliver Yates

9 February 2019 31	Bristol Rovers	1–1	Shrewsbury Town	Horfield
15:00 GMT	Partington (yellow card) 19'; Ogogo (yellow card) 24'; Rodman 53' (yellow card) 68'	Report	Norburn (yellow card) 24'; Whalley 36'; Golbourne (yellow card) 68'; Edwards (red card) 85'	Stadium: Memorial Stadium; Attendance: 8,322; Referee: Peter Wright

19 February 2019 32	Portsmouth	1-1	Bristol Rovers	Portsmouth
19:45 GMT	J.Clarke 58' (o.g.); Lowe (yellow card) 64'; Brown (yellow card) 64'	Report	Clarke-Harris 37'	Stadium: Fratton Park; Attendance: 17,880; Referee: Neil Hair

23 February 2019 33	Bristol Rovers	0–2	Sunderland	Horfield
15:00 GMT		Report	O'Nien (yellow card) 23' (goal) 25'; James (yellow card) 49'; McGeady 55'; Dunne (yellow card) 70'	Stadium: Memorial Stadium; Attendance: 10,009; Referee: James Linington

2 March 2019 34	Bristol Rovers	4–0	Blackpool	Horfield
15:00 GMT	Clarke-Harris 6', 37', 68'; Nichols (yellow card) 18'; Sercombe 90+1'	Report	Turton (yellow card) 15'	Stadium: Memorial Stadium; Attendance: 8,496; Referee: Darren Drysdale

9 March 2019 35	Scunthorpe United	0–1	Bristol Rovers	Scunthorpe
15:00 GMT	Sutton (yellow card) 42'; McMahon (yellow card) 90'	Report	Clarke-Harris 35'; Upson (yellow card) 70'; Ogogo (yellow card) 87'; Kelly (yellow card) 90'; Craig (yellow card) 90+4'	Stadium: Glanford Park; Attendance: 3,877; Referee: Trevor Kettle

12 March 2019 36	Gillingham	0–1	Bristol Rovers	Gillingham
19:45 GMT	Fuller (yellow card) 90+4'	Report	Clarke-Harris 57'	Stadium: Priestfield Stadium; Attendance: 3,938; Referee: Christopher Sarginson

16 March 2019 37	Bristol Rovers	0–0	Charlton Athletic	Horfield
15:00 GMT	Upson (yellow card) 83'	Report	Taylor (yellow card) 76'	Stadium: Memorial Stadium; Attendance: 8,343; Referee: Dean Whitestone

23 March 2019 38	Plymouth Argyle	2–2	Bristol Rovers	Plymouth
15:00 GMT	Lameiras 51'; Craig 75' (o.g.); Ness (yellow card) 88'	Report	Clarke-Harris 72'; Reilly 90+1'; Clarke (yellow card) 90+4'	Stadium: Home Park; Attendance: 12,003; Referee: Roger East

26 March 2019 39	Doncaster Rovers	4–1	Bristol Rovers	Doncaster
19:45 GMT	Coppinger 3', 12'; Wilks 31' (yellow card) 49'; Sadlier 46'	Report	Clarke-Harris 66' (pen.); Holmes-Dennis (yellow card) 70'; Upson (yellow card) 74'; Clarke (yellow card) 90+4'	Stadium: Keepmoat Stadium; Attendance: 6,907; Referee: Martin Coy

30 March 2019 40	Bristol Rovers	1–2	Luton Town	Horfield
15:00 GMT	Clarke-Harris 45+2'; Sercombe (yellow card) 71'	Report	Collins 17'; Berry 39'	Stadium: Memorial Stadium; Attendance: 9,037; Referee: Charles Breakspear

7 April 2019 41	Coventry City	0–0	Bristol Rovers	Coventry
15:00 BST	Bakayoko (yellow card) 44'	Report	Clarke-Harris (yellow card) 38'	Stadium: Ricoh Arena; Attendance: 12,664; Referee: Anthony Backhouse

13 April 2019 42	Bristol Rovers	3–2	Bradford City	Horfield
15:00 BST	Sercombe (yellow card) 31'; Clarke-Harris 38', 90+3' (yellow card) 57'; Upson (yellow card) 56'; Ogogo (yellow card) 66'; Clarke 72'	Report	O'Brien 16'; Knight-Percival 90'	Stadium: Memorial Stadium; Attendance: 8,418; Referee: Michael Salisbury

19 April 2019 43	AFC Wimbledon	1–1	Bristol Rovers	Kingston upon Thames
15:00 BST	Pigott 22'; Nightingale (yellow card) 49'	Report	Lockyer (yellow card) 43'; Clarke (yellow card) 47' (goal) 78'	Stadium: Kingsmeadow; Attendance: 4,850; Referee: Graham Salisbury

22 April 2019 44	Bristol Rovers	0–1	Rochdale	Horfield
15:00 BST	Upson (yellow card) 22'; Clarke (yellow card) 57'	Report	McNulty (yellow card) 14'; Bunney (yellow card) 38'; Williams (yellow card) 78'; Hamilton 82'; Done (yellow card) 85'	Stadium: Memorial Stadium; Attendance: 8,516; Referee: Craig Hicks

27 April 2019 45	Fleetwood Town	0–0	Bristol Rovers	Fleetwood
15:00 BST	Evans (yellow card) 81'; Madden (yellow card) 81'	Report	Partington (yellow card) 45+1'; Ogogo (yellow card) 69'; Clarke (yellow card) 77'; Lockyer (yellow card) 81'; Bonham (yellow card) 81'; Upson (yellow card) 87'	Stadium: Highbury Stadium; Attendance: 3,488; Referee: Jarred Gillett

4 May 2019 46	Bristol Rovers	2–1	Barnsley	Horwich
17:30 BST	Rodman 71', 90+2'; Upson (yellow card) 77'	Report	Moore 12'; Lindsay (yellow card) 37' (yellow-red card) 44'; Mowatt (yellow card) 56'	Stadium: Memorial Stadium; Attendance: 9,859; Referee: Darren Drysdale

=== FA Cup ===
The first round draw was made live on BBC by Dennis Wise and Dion Dublin on 22 October.

11 November 2018 First round	Barnet	1–1	Bristol Rovers	Canons Park
12:45 GMT	Robson 16'	Report	Sinclair (red card) 7'; Lines 66' (pen.)	Stadium: The Hive Stadium; Referee: Robert Lewis

21 November 2018 First round replay	Bristol Rovers	1–2	Barnet	Horfield
19:45 GMT	Nichols 62'	Report	Robson 75'; Harrison 77'	Stadium: Memorial Stadium; Attendance: 2,740; Referee: Lee Swabey

=== EFL Cup ===
On 15 June 2018, the draw for the first round was made in Vietnam. The second round draw was made from the Stadium of Light on 16 August.

14 August 2018 First round	Bristol Rovers	2–1	Crawley Town	The Memorial Stadium
19:45 BST	Bennett 32'; Clarke 84'	Report	Connolly 88'; Poleon (yellow card) 85' (yellow-red card) 90+4'	Stadium: Memorial Stadium; Attendance: 2,336; Referee: Lee Swabey

28 August 2018 Second round	Queens Park Rangers	3–1	Bristol Rovers	Shepherd's Bush, London
19:45 BST	Osayi-Samuel 4'; Wszołek 18'; Smith 64'	Report	Upson 87'	Stadium: Loftus Road; Attendance: 5,007; Referee: Charles Breakspear

=== EFL Trophy ===
On 13 July 2018, the initial group stage draw bar the U21 invited clubs was announced. The draw for the second round was made live on Talksport by Leon Britton and Steve Claridge on 16 November. On 8 December, the third round draw was drawn by Alan McInally and Matt Le Tissier on Soccer Saturday. The Quarter-final draw was made conducted on Sky Sports by Don Goodman and Thomas Frank on 10 January 2019. The draw for the semi-finals took place on 25 January live on Talksport.

Pos	Lge	Team	Pld	W	PW	PL	L	GF	GA	GD	Pts	Qualification
1	L2	Exeter City	3	2	1	0	0	4	0	+4	8	Round 2
2	L1	Bristol Rovers	3	2	0	0	1	4	2	+2	6	Round 2
3	L2	Yeovil Town	3	1	0	1	1	4	2	+2	4	
4	ACA	West Ham United U21	3	0	0	0	3	0	8	−8	0	

Source: EFL.com

18 September 2018 Group stage	Bristol Rovers	2–0	West Ham United U21	Horfield
19:45 BST	Jakubiak 57'; Lockyer 82'	Report		Stadium: Memorial Stadium; Attendance: 1,021

9 October 2018 Group stages	Bristol Rovers	2–0	Yeovil Town	Horfield
19:45 BST	Jakubiak 50'; Rodman 85'	Report		Stadium: Memorial Stadium; Attendance: 1,179

13 November 2018 Group stages	Exeter City	2–0	Bristol Rovers	Exeter
19:45 GMT	Forte 50'; Randall 81'	Report		Stadium: St James Park; Attendance: 873

5 December 2018 Second round	Swansea City U21	1–2	Bristol Rovers	Swansea
19:45 GMT	Garrick 54'	Report	Craig 58'; Jakubiak 89'	Stadium: Liberty Stadium

8 January 2019 Third round	Northampton Town	1–2	Bristol Rovers	Northampton
19:45 GMT	Crooks (yellow card) 45+1' (goal) 76'	Report	Broadbent 45'; Payne 58'	Stadium: Sixfields Stadium; Attendance: 1,312; Referee: Charles Breakspear

22 January 2019 Quarter-final	Bristol Rovers	3–0	Port Vale	Horfield
19:45 GMT	Clarke 15' (yellow card) 22'; Rodman (yellow card) 45+2' (goal) 68'; Nichols 62' (pen.)	Report	Hannant (yellow card) 45+2'; Conlon (yellow card) 54' (yellow-red card) 58'	Stadium: Memorial Stadium; Attendance: 2,016

5 March 2019 Semi-final	Bristol Rovers	0–2	Sunderland	Horfield
19:45 GMT	Nichols (yellow card) 38'; Craig (yellow card) 86'	Report	Grigg 44'; Morgan 47'	Stadium: Memorial Stadium; Attendance: 6,699; Referee: Michael Salisbury
