= Tom Broadbent (English footballer) =

English footballer (born 1992)

Personal information
- Full name: Thomas William Broadbent
- Date of birth: 15 February 1992 (age 34)
- Place of birth: Basingstoke, England
- Height: 6 ft 3 in (1.91 m)
- Position: Central defender

Youth career
- Southampton
- Portsmouth
- Bournemouth

Senior career*
Years	Team	Apps	(Gls)
- Bognor Regis Town
- Chichester City
- Pagham
- Selsey
- Army
2015–2016	Farnborough		
2016	Petersfield Town		
2016–2017	Hayes & Yeading United	26	(2)
2017–2019	Bristol Rovers	29	(0)
2019–2021	Swindon Town	39	(1)
2021–2022	Eastleigh	30	(1)
2022–2025	South Shields	103	(7)
2026	Tow Law Town	1	(0)
2026	Spennymoor Town	8	(0)
- * Club domestic league appearances and goals as of 07:22, 1 May 2026 (UTC)

Thomas William Broadbent (born 15 February 1992) is an English professional footballer who plays as a central defender.

== Career ==
Born in Basingstoke, Broadbent spent time with the youth academies of Southampton, Portsmouth and Bournemouth. He then began playing first-team football for Bognor Regis Town at the age of 16, before moving to Chichester City. He also spent time with Pagham and Selsey.

After working in a supermarket and as a carpenter and labourer, Broadbent joined the Army at the age of 19. Broadbent spent 6 years in the Army, serving as a Lance Bombardier with the Royal Artillery in Afghanistan. He represented the Army at football, and in 2015 he began playing semi-professional non-league football, appearing for Farnborough, Petersfield Town and Hayes & Yeading United. He captained Hayes & Yeading for the 2016–17 season.

=== Bristol Rovers ===
After leaving the Army to start a career in professional football, Broadbent signed for Bristol Rovers in July 2017. He made his professional debut on the opening day of the 2017–18 season, playing the entirety of a 1–0 away defeat at Charlton Athletic.

Broadbent scored his first professional goal on 8 January 2019 in a 2–1 EFL Trophy victory over Northampton Town, opening the scoring on the stroke of half-time, in the match which proved to be his final game for the club.

=== Swindon Town ===
He moved to Swindon Town in January 2019. He made his debut on 26 January in a 1–0 home defeat to Crawley Town.

He scored his first goal for Swindon on 10 November 2020 in an EFL Trophy group game against Forest Green Rovers. Broadbent featured nine times in the league across the 2019–20 season when despite the league's early curtailment due to the COVID-19 pandemic, Swindon were awarded the League Two title on a points-per-game basis.

Broadbent's first league goal for the club came on 28 November 2020, when he scored an 85th-minute equaliser as Swindon produced an impressive comeback to defeat rivals Oxford United, Tyler Smith going on to score a late winner. The 2020–21 season ultimately ended in disappointment for Swindon as immediate relegation back to League Two was confirmed with two matches remaining with a 5–0 defeat at Milton Keynes Dons, Broadbent being brought on as a substitute in the first half. On 14 May 2021 it was announced that he would leave Swindon at the end of the season, following the expiry of his contract.

=== Eastleigh ===
In July 2021, Broadbent joined National League side Eastleigh following his release from Swindon. Broadbent had to wait until 9 October to make his debut, playing the full ninety minutes as Eastleigh got a late winner at Wealdstone. Broadbent joked after the match that he was so tired after his return from injury that he was unable to celebrate the last minute winner. Broadbent was released at the end of the 2021–22 season.

=== South Shields ===
On 29 June 2022, Broadbent joined Northern Premier League Premier Division club South Shields, a deal described by Broadbent's new manager Kevin Phillips as a "massive coup". On 10 April 2023, Broadbent headed home the game's only goal as South Shields defeated Whitby Town to secure the Northern Premier League title.

On 25 April 2025, Broadbent announced his retirement from professional football following the conclusion of the 2024–25 season.

=== Spennymoor Town ===
In February 2026, following a short spell with Northern League Division Two club Tow Law Town, Broadbent signed for semi-professional National League North side Spennymoor Town. He made eight appearances for the club before leaving at the end of the 2025–26 season following the expiration of his short-term contract.

== Career statistics ==
As of end of 2025–26 season

Appearances and goals by club, season and competition
Club	Season	League			FA Cup		EFL Cup		Other		Total	
Club	Season	Division	Apps	Goals	Apps	Goals	Apps	Goals	Apps	Goals	Apps	Goals
Hayes & Yeading United	2016–17	Southern League Premier Division	26	2	0	0	—		6	0	32	2
Bristol Rovers	2017–18	League One	22	0	1	0	1	0	1 (Note: Appearance(s) in EFL Trophy)	0	25	0
Bristol Rovers	2018–19	League One	7	0	0	0	1	0	3	1	11	1
Bristol Rovers	Total		29	0	1	0	2	0	4	1	36	1
Swindon Town	2018–19	League Two	12	0	0	0	0	0	0	0	12	0
Swindon Town	2019–20	League Two	9	0	0	0	1	0	3	0	13	0
Swindon Town	2020–21	League One	18	1	0	0	0	0	1	1	19	2
Swindon Town	Total		39	1	0	0	1	0	4	1	44	2
Eastleigh	2021–22	National League	30	1	2	0	—		0	0	32	1
South Shields	2022–23	NPL Premier Division	31	5	4	0	—		2 (Note: Appearance(s) in FA Trophy)	0	37	5
South Shields	2023–24	National League North	44	1	1	0	—		1	0	46	1
South Shields	2024–25	National League North	28	1	1	0	—		0	0	29	1
South Shields	Total		103	7	6	0	0	0	3	0	112	7
Tow Law Town	2025–26	Northern League Division Two	1	0	0	0	—		0	0	1	0
Spennymoor Town	2025–26	National League North	8	0	—		—		0	0	8	0
Career total			236	11	9	0	3	0	17	2	265	13

== Honours ==
Swindon Town

- EFL League Two: 2019–20

South Shields

- Northern Premier League: 2022–23
