= 2016–17 Bristol Rovers F.C. season =

Bristol Rovers F.C.
2016–17 season
- Chairman: Steve Hamer
- Manager: Darrell Clarke
- Stadium: Memorial Stadium
- League One: 10th
- FA Cup: Second round proper (Eliminated by Barrow)
- EFL Cup: Second round (Eliminated by Chelsea)
- EFL Trophy: Group stage (Eliminated at the group stages)
- Top goalscorer: League: Matty Taylor (16); All: Matty Taylor (18)
- Highest home attendance: 11,750 (vs. Millwall, 30 April 2017)
- Lowest home attendance: 7,805 (vs. Walsall, 13 September 2016)
- Average home league attendance: 9,219
Home colours	Away colours

The 2016–17 season was the 134th season in Bristol Rovers' history and their 89th in the English Football League. Following back-to-back promotions in 2014–15 and 2015–16, Rovers competed in the third tier of English football, League One. What was a steady season, Rovers played the likes of Coventry and Chelsea (in the EFL Cup) for the first time in decades. After a brief playoff push towards the end of the season, Rovers finished in a respectable 10th place with 66 points, their highest finish in the football league since the 1999–2000 season.

== Season events ==
=== Pre-season ===
Rovers manager Darrell Clarke was quick to make good on his promise to offer all out-of-contract senior players new contracts if the club was promoted, confirming that, with the exception of Rory Fallon, new deals were "in the post" just five days after the previous season had concluded. In addition to Lee Brown and Tom Lockyer, whose deals were signed before the season had ended, goalkeeper Steve Mildenhall and midfielder Jay Malpas were the first to sign a new deals on 17 May. Toward the end of May, Clarke himself had agreed a new three-year contract, making him the highest paid manager in the club's history. This came after the club received a formal approach from Championship side Leeds United which Rovers rejected.

June saw defender Daniel Leadbitter and winger Billy Bodin sign new two-year contracts at Rovers. Goalkeeper Will Puddy, defenders James Clarke and Mark McChrystal, midfielders Lee Mansell Cristian Montaño, Jake Gosling, Ollie Clarke and Chris Lines and forward Ellis Harrison also agreed a new deals of undisclosed duration. Tom Parkes meanwhile rejected the offer of a new deal and instead joined League Two side Leyton Orient. On 16 June, defender Peter Hartley became the club's first signing of the season on a free transfer from Plymouth Argyle followed a day later by the signing of winger Byron Moore from Port Vale.

Peterborough United forward Luke James became July's first signing, on a season long loan. Rovers' top goalscorer of the previous two seasons, Matty Taylor, signed a new contract in July, ending speculation linking him with a move away.

== First team ==
As of game played on 31 August 2016

No.	Name	Position	Nationality	Place of birth	Date of birth	Club caps	Club goals	Int. caps	Int. goals	Previous club	Notes
Goalkeepers
1	Steve Mildenhall	GK	(England)	Swindon	13 May 1979	125	0	0	0	Millwall	
25	Will Puddy	GK	(England)	Warminster	4 October 1987	16	0	0	0	Salisbury City	
33	Kelle Roos	GK	(Netherlands)	Rijkevoort	31 May 1992	0	0	0	0	On loan from Derby County	
Defenders
2	Daniel Leadbitter	RB	(England)	Newcastle upon Tyne	7 October 1990	58	1	0	0	Hereford United	
3	Lee Brown	LB	(England)	London	10 August 1990	213	20	0	0	Queens Park Rangers	
4	Tom Lockyer	CB/RB	(Wales)	Cardiff	3 December 1994	134	2	0	0	Youth team graduate	Vice Captain
5	Mark McChrystal	CB	(Northern Ireland)	Derry	26 June 1984	111	0	0	0	Tranmere Rovers	Club captain
6	Peter Hartley	CB	(England)	Hartlepool	3 April 1988	1	0	0	0	Plymouth Argyle	
15	James Clarke	RB/CB	(England)	Aylesbury	17 November 1989	39	0	0	0	Woking	
19	Danny Greenslade	LB	(England)	Belper	23 September 1996	0	0	0	0	Youth team graduate	
26	Tyler Lyttle	RB	(England)	Nottingham	12 November 1996	1	0	0	0	Youth team graduate	
31	Connor Roberts	RB	(Wales)	Neath	23 September 1995	0	0	0	0	on loan from Swansea City	
32	Alfie Kilgour	CB	(England)	Bath		0	0	0	0	Youth team graduate	
36	Jake Clarke-Salter	CB	(England)	Carshalton	22 September 1997	0	0	0	0	On loan from Chelsea	
Midfielders
7	Lee Mansell	CM	(England)	Gloucester	23 September 1982	72	7	0	0	Torquay United	
8	Ollie Clarke	CM	(England)	Portishead	29 June 1992	101	8	0	0	Youth team graduate	
11	Jake Gosling	RM/LM	(Gibraltar)	(England) Oxford	11 August 1993	41	3	11	2	Exeter City	
14	Chris Lines	CM	(England)	Bristol	30 November 1985	211	21	0	0	Port Vale	
16	Liam Lawrence	RM/LM	(Republic of Ireland)	(England) Retford	14 December 1981	12	1	15	2	Shrewsbury Town	
18	Dominic Thomas	CM	(England)	London	23 November 1995	0	0	0	0	Youth team graduate	
21	Cristian Montaño	RM/LM	(Colombia)	Cali	11 December 1991	30	2	0	0	América de Cali	
22	Byron Moore	LM/CF	(England)	Stoke-on-Trent	24 August 1988	0	0	0	0	Port Vale	
23	Billy Bodin	LM/CF	(Wales)	(England) Swindon	24 March 1992	40	13	0	0	Northampton Town	
24	Stuart Sinclair	CM	(England)	Houghton Conquest	9 November 1987	58	4	0	0	Salisbury City	
27	Ryan Broom	RM	(Wales)	Newport	4 September 1996	1	0	0	0	Youth team graduate	
28	Jay Malpas	CM	(England)	Bristol	25 May 1997	0	0	0	0	Youth team graduate	
34	Hiram Boateng	CM	(England)	London	8 January 1996	0	0	0	0	On loan from Crystal Palace	
35	Charlie Colkett	CM	(England)	Newham	22 September 1997	0	0	0	0	On loan from Chelsea	
Forwards
9	Ellis Harrison	CF/LM	(Wales)	Newport	29 January 1994	106	24	0	0	Youth team graduate	
10	Matty Taylor	CF	(England)	Oxford	30 March 1990	93	47	0	0	Forest Green Rovers	
17	Jermaine Easter	CF	(Wales)	Cardiff	15 January 1982	48	9	12	0	Millwall	
20	Jamie Lucas	CF	(Wales)	Pontypridd	6 December 1995	2	0	0	0	Youth team graduate	
29	Luke James	CF	(England)	Amble	4 November 1994	1	0	0	0	On loan from Peterborough United	
30	Rory Gaffney	CF	(Republic of Ireland)	Tuam	23 October 1989	26	8	0	0	Cambridge United	

=== Transfers ===
==== In ====
Date	Position	Player	Transferred from	Fee	Ref.
1 July 2016	CB	Peter Hartley	Plymouth Argyle	Free transfer	
1 July 2016	LM	Byron Moore	Port Vale	Free transfer	
13 January 2017	CB	Joe Partington	Eastleigh	Undisclosed	
26 January 2017	CB	Jonny Burn	Middlesbrough	Undisclosed	
2 February 2017	LB	Bob Harris	Sheffield United	Free transfer	

==== Loans in ====
Date	Position	Player	Loaned from	End date	Ref.
6 July 2016	CF	Luke James	Peterborough United	End of Season	
24 August 2016	GK	Kelle Roos	Derby County	10 January 2017 (Note: On 10 January 2017, Kelle Roos' was recalled to Derby County.)	
25 August 2016	DF	Connor Roberts	Swansea City	2 January 2017	
31 August 2016	CM	Hiram Boateng	Crystal Palace	2 January 2017	
31 August 2016	CB	Jake Clarke-Salter	Chelsea	End of Season	
31 August 2016	CM	Charlie Colkett	Chelsea	2 January 2017 (Recalled)	
18 January 2017	GK	Joe Lumley	Queens Park Rangers	End of Season	
20 January 2017	CB	Ryan Sweeney	Stoke City	End of Season	

==== Out ====
Date	Position	Player	Transferred to	Fee	Ref.
30 June 2016	CF	Rory Fallon	Truro City (Note: Following Fallon's release on 12 May 2016, he later agreed to join Truro City on 9 June 2016.)	Free transfer	
30 June 2016	DF	Tom Parkes	Leyton Orient	Free transfer	
30 June 2016	GK	Kieran Preston	Grantham Town F.C. (Note: Following Preston's release on 12 May 2016, he later agreed to join Grantham Town F.C. on 14 July 2017.)	Released	
31 January 2017	FW	Matty Taylor	Bristol City	Undisclosed	

==== Loans out ====
Date	Position	Player	Loaned to	End date	Ref.
18 August 2016	RW	Jake Gosling	Cambridge United	2 January 2017	
31 August 2016	Striker	Jamie Lucas	Boreham Wood	28 January 2017	

== Squad statistics ==
Numbers in parentheses denote appearances as substitute.
Players with squad numbers struck through and marked † left the club during the playing season.
Players with names in italics and marked * were on loan from another club for the whole of their season with Bristol Rovers.
Players listed with no appearances have been in the matchday squad but only as unused substitutes.
Key to positions: GK – Goalkeeper; DF – Defender; MF – Midfielder; FW – Forward

No.	Pos.	Nat.	Name	Apps	Goals	Apps	Goals	Apps	Goals	Apps	Goals	Apps	Goals	Yellow card	Red card
No.	Pos.	Nat.	Name	League		FA Cup		EFL Cup		EFL Trophy		Total		Discipline	
1	GK	ENG	Steve Mildenhall	4	0	0	0	2	0	0	0	6	0	0	0
2	DF	ENG	Daniel Leadbitter	28 (2)	0	1	0	2	0	3	0	34 (2)	0	3	1
3	DF	ENG	Lee Brown	41	0	3	1	2	0	2	0	48	1	5	0
4	DF	WAL	Tom Lockyer	46	0	3	0	2	0	0	0	51	0	8	0
~~5~~ †	DF	NIR	Mark McChrystal	3 (1)	0	0	0	0	0	2	0	5 (1)	0	3	0
6	DF	ENG	Peter Hartley	17 (1)	5	3	0	2	1	2	0	24 (1)	6	5	0
7	MF	ENG	Lee Mansell	4 (5)	0	0	0	0	0	1	0	5 (5)	0	4	0
8	MF	ENG	Ollie Clarke	30	4	2	0	2	0	0 (2)	0	34 (2)	4	9	0
9	FW	WAL	Ellis Harrison	25 (12)	8	1 (1)	0	2	1	0 (1)	0	28 (14)	9	8	0
~~10~~ †	FW	ENG	Matty Taylor	23 (4)	16	2	2	1 (1)	0	0 (2)	1	26 (7)	19	5	0
11	MF	GIB	Jake Gosling	0	0	0	0	0	0	0	0	0	0	0	0
14	MF	ENG	Chris Lines	40 (4)	3	2	0	2	1	0 (1)	0	44 (5)	4	6	0
15	DF	ENG	James Clarke	19 (3)	0	1	0	1	0	2	0	23 (3)	0	2	0
~~16~~ †	MF	IRL	Liam Lawrence	1 (3)	0	0	0	0	0	1	0	2 (3)	0	0	0
16	DF	SCO	Bob Harris	4 (1)	0	0	0	0	0	0	0	4 (1)	0	1	0
17	FW	WAL	Jermaine Easter	9 (12)	4	1	0	0 (1)	0	2	1	12 (13)	5	2	1
20	FW	WAL	Jamie Lucas	0 (1)	0	0	0	0	0	0	0	0 (1)	0	0	0
21	MF	COL	Cristian Montaño	12 (13)	1	1 (2)	0	0 (1)	0	2	0	15 (16)	1	1	0
22	MF	ENG	Byron Moore	12 (15)	2	1 (1)	0	0	0	1	0	14 (16)	2	2	0
23	MF	WAL	Billy Bodin	27 (9)	13	0 (2)	0	1 (1)	0	1 (1)	0	29 (13)	13	2	0
24	MF	ENG	Stuart Sinclair	37 (1)	1	3	0	2	0	2	0	44 (1)	1	7	1
25	GK	ENG	Will Puddy	7	0	0	0	0	0	0 (1)	0	7 (1)	0	0	0
27	MF	WAL	Ryan Broom	0 (5)	0	0	0	0	0	0	0	0 (5)	0	0	0
29	FW	ENG	Luke James *	10 (14)	0	1 (2)	0	1	0	2	0	14 (16)	0	1	0
30	FW	IRL	Rory Gaffney	22 (12)	6	2	3	0 (2)	0	3	0	27 (14)	9	5	0
~~31~~ †	DF	WAL	Connor Roberts *	2	0	2	0	0	0	1	0	5	0	1	0
31	GK	ENG	Joe Lumley *	19	0	0	0	0	0	0	0	19	0	1	0
~~33~~ †	GK	NED	Kelle Roos *	16 (1)	0	3	0	0	0	3	0	22 (1)	0	1	0
33	DF	IRL	Ryan Sweeney *	16	0	0	0	0	0	0	0	16	0	6	0
~~34~~ †	MF	ENG	Hiram Boateng *	9	0	1	0	0	0	2	0	12	0	1	0
34	DF	WAL	Joe Partington	4 (3)	0	0	0	0	0	0	0	4 (3)	0	0	0
~~35~~ †	MF	ENG	Charlie Colkett *	8 (7)	3	0	0	0	0	1 (1)	0	9 (8)	3	2	0
36	DF	ENG	Jake Clarke-Salter *	9 (3)	1	0 (1)	0	0	0	0	0	9 (4)	1	0	0
41	GK	ENG	Kieran Hodges	0	0	0	0	0	0	0	0	0	0	0	0

Players not included in matchday squads
No.	Pos.	Nat.	Name
18	MF	ENG	Dominic Thomas
19	DF	ENG	Danny Greenslade
~~26~~ †	DF	ENG	Tyler Lyttle
28	MF	ENG	Jay Malpas
32	DF	ENG	Alfie Kilgour

== Competitions ==
Won Drawn Lost Postponed

=== Pre-season friendlies ===
On 23 November 2015, Rovers first pre-season fixture was announced. As part of a week-long training camp in Spain, Rovers will play CE Sabadell with whom the club have a connection due to both playing in blue and white quartered shirts. Further fixtures were announced once the previous season had concluded, with Rovers due to play Salisbury, Bath City, Mangotsfield United, Weston-super-Mare and Exeter City, all away, and Cheltenham Town, Swansea City and Aston Villa at home.

8 July 2016	Mangotsfield United	3–5	Bristol Rovers	Cossham Street
19:30 BST	Batten 3'; Morgan 49'; Bament 85'	Report	Gaffney 21'; Montaño 41'; Broom 58', 60'; J. Clarke 89'	Referee: Savvas Yianni

9 July 2016	Salisbury	0–3	Bristol Rovers	Raymond McEnhill Stadium
12:00 BST		Report	Harrison 18' (pen.); O. Clarke 37'; Bodin 66'	Attendance: 865

12 July 2016	Bath City	0–1	Bristol Rovers	Twerton Park
19:45 BST		Report	J. Clarke 69'	Attendance: 1,126; Referee: Savvas Yianni

13 July 2016	Weston-super-Mare	1–3	Bristol Rovers	Woodspring Stadium
19:45 BST	Richards 39'	Report	Gaffney 10'; Easter 20' (pen.); Lucas 49'	Attendance: 820; Referee: Savvas Yianni

16 July 2016	Exeter City	2–0	Bristol Rovers	St James Park
15:00 BST	Harley 8'; Watkins 37'	Report		Attendance: 1,247 (197); Referee: Lee Swabey

20 July 2016	Bristol Rovers	1–1	Aston Villa	Memorial Stadium
19:45 BST	Taylor 78'	Report	Ayew 42'	Attendance: 5,219 (1,013); Referee: Simon Hooper

23 July 2016	Bristol Rovers	1–5	Swansea City	Memorial Stadium
15:00 BST	James 50'	Report	Ayew 6'; Fer 13'; Kingsley 18'; Naughton 45'; Routledge 68'	Attendance: 4,365 (1,073); Referee: Lee Probert

26 July 2016	CE Sabadell	3–0	Bristol Rovers	Estadi de la Nova Creu Alta
19:00 CEST	López 35'; Chiekh 48'; Yeray 89'	Report

31 July 2016	Bristol Rovers	3–0	Cheltenham Town	Memorial Stadium
15:00 BST	Harrison 8'; Lines 39'; Taylor 53'	Report		Attendance: 1,607 (104); Referee: Simon Hooper

=== League One ===
On 22 June 2016, the EFL announced the fixtures for the forthcoming season. Rovers started the season away to Scunthorpe United on 6 August, followed by their first home fixture on 14 August against fellow promoted side Oxford United. The traditional Boxing Day fixture sees Rovers host Coventry City while the season will end with Millwall travelling to the Memorial Stadium.

==== League table ====
Pos	Team	Pld	W	D	L	GF	GA	GD	Pts
8	Oxford United	46	20	9	17	65	52	+13	69
9	Rochdale	46	19	12	15	71	62	+9	69
10	Bristol Rovers	46	18	12	16	68	70	−2	66
11	Peterborough United	46	17	11	18	62	62	0	62
12	Milton Keynes Dons	46	16	13	17	60	58	+2	61

Source: BBC Sport
Rules for classification: 1) Points; 2) Goal difference; 3) Number of goals scored

==== Results summary ====
Overall								Home						Away					
Pld	W	D	L	GF	GA	GD	Pts	W	D	L	GF	GA	GD	W	D	L	GF	GA	GD
44	18	11	15	63	62	+1	65	13	5	3	38	17	+21	5	6	12	25	45	−20

Last updated: 19 April 2017.

==== Results by round ====
Round	1	2	3	4	5	6	7	8	9	10	11	12	13	14	15	16	17	18	19	20	21	22	23	24	25	26	27	28	29	30	31	32	33	34	35	36	37	38	39	40	41	42	43	44	45	46
Ground	A	H	H	A	H	H	A	A	H	A	A	H	A	A	H	H	A	H	H	A	H	A	H	H	A	H	A	A	H	A	H	H	A	H	A	A	H	A	H	A	H	H	A	H	A	H
Result	L	W	L	D	D	D	D	W	W	L	W	W	D	W	L	W	L	D	L	L	W	L	W	W	L	W	L	L	W	D	D	D	D	D	D	W	W	L	W	L	W	W	L	W	L	L
Position	21	12	17	18	19	19	21	15	9	10	7	8	10	5	8	5	5	8	10	13	11	12	10	10	10	8	10	10	8	9	10	10	10	11	11	8	8	8	8	9	8	8	9	8	10	10

Updated to match(es) played on 24 April 2017. Source:
A = Away; H = Home; W = Win; D = Draw; L = Loss

==== Matches ====
6 August 2016 1	Scunthorpe United	3–1	Bristol Rovers	Scunthorpe
15:00 BST	van Veen 66'; Morris 81'; Clarke (yellow card) 87'; Wootton 90+6'	Report	O. Clarke (yellow card) 11'; Taylor 31'; Lockyer (yellow card) 40'	Stadium: Glanford Park; Attendance: 4,636; Referee: Ben Toner

14 August 2016 2	Bristol Rovers	2–1	Oxford United	Horfield
15:00 BST	Lines (yellow card) 11'; Easter 25'; Gaffney (yellow card) 29'; Taylor 70'; J.Clarke (yellow card) 76'; O.Clarke (yellow card) 78'	Report	Hemmings 42'; Long (yellow card) 45+3' (yellow-red card) 67'; Martin (yellow card) 56'	Stadium: Memorial Stadium; Attendance: 10,053; Referee: Charles Breakspear

17 August 2016 3	Bristol Rovers	1–2	Bolton Wanderers	Horfield
19:45 BST	Harrison 57'	Report	Vela 6'; Spearing 26' (yellow card) 72'; Trotter (yellow card) 56'; Madine (yellow card) 75'; Wilkinson (yellow card) 90+4'	Stadium: Memorial Stadium; Attendance: 9,169 (700)

20 August 2016 4	Southend United	1–1	Bristol Rovers	Southend-on-Sea
15:00 BST	McLaughlin (yellow card) 56'; King (yellow card) 75'; Cox 81' (pen.) (yellow card) 82'	Report	Clarke (yellow card) 48'; Hartley 61' (yellow card) 85'	Stadium: Roots Hall; Attendance: 6,084 (518)

10 September 2016 5	Bristol Rovers	2–2	Rochdale	Bristol
15:00 BST	Taylor 21', 49'; Lines (yellow card) 56'; Harrison (yellow card) 70'	Report	Camps 17'; Henderson 22'; Vincenti (yellow card) 42'; Allen (yellow card) 47'; Canavan (yellow card) 49' (yellow-red card) 72'; McNulty (yellow card) 90+4'	Stadium: Memorial Stadium; Attendance: 8,057 (137)

13 September 2016 6	Bristol Rovers	1–1	Walsall	Bristol
19:45 BST	Taylor 27' (pen.); Sinclair (yellow card) 70'	Report	Oztumer 16' (yellow card) 33'; Moussa (yellow card) 47'	Stadium: Memorial Stadium; Attendance: 7,805 (170)

17 September 2016 7	Bradford City	1–1	Bristol Rovers	Bradford
15:00 BST	Meredith 73'	Report	Colkett 86'	Stadium: Coral Windows Stadium; Attendance: 17,499 (576)

20 September 2016 8	Swindon Town	1–2	Bristol Rovers	Swindon
19:45 BST	Jones 6'; Yaser Kasim (yellow card) 43'; Furlong (yellow card) 67'; Thomas (yellow card) 70'	Report	Sinclair (yellow card) 31'; Gaffney (yellow card) 43'; Bodin (yellow card) 44'; Brown (yellow card) 50'; Taylor 83' (pen.); Raphael Branco 84' (o.g.); Lockyer (yellow card) 87'; Harrison (yellow card) 90+2'	Stadium: County Ground; Attendance: 6,760 (414)

24 September 2016 9	Bristol Rovers	2–1	Port Vale	Bristol
15:00 BST	Harrison 44'; Easter 63' (pen.); Sinclair (yellow card) 87'	Report	Paterson 23' (yellow card) 61'; Thomas (yellow card) 41'; Streete (yellow card) 60'; Jones (yellow card) 65'; Brown (yellow card) 90+5'	Stadium: Memorial Stadium; Attendance: 9,088 (436)

27 September 2016 10	Sheffield United	1–0	Bristol Rovers	Sheffield
19:45 BST	Coutts (yellow card) 37'; Chapman 65'; Lavery (yellow card) 90+3'	Report	Boateng (yellow card) 30'; Easter (red card) 66'; Leadbitter (yellow card) 90+2'	Stadium: Bramall Lane; Attendance: 19,196; Referee: Chris Sarginson

1 October 2016 11	Northampton Town	2–3	Bristol Rovers	Northampton
15:00 BST	Revell 9', 76' (yellow card) 68'; Zakuani (yellow card) 73' (yellow-red card) 90+1'; O'Toole (yellow card) 81'	Report	Gaffney 60'; Hartley (yellow card) 65' (goal) 71'; Colkett 90+2' (yellow card) 90+3'	Stadium: Sixfields Stadium; Attendance: 6,642; Referee: Graham Horwood

15 October 2016 12	Bristol Rovers	2–1	Gillingham	Bristol
15:00 BST	Taylor (yellow card) 35'; Lines (yellow card) 42' (goal) 82'; Harrison 90'	Report	Hessenthaler (yellow card) 29'; Herd (yellow card) 31'; Dack (yellow card) 55'; Wright 62' (yellow card) 64'; Nouble (yellow card) 88'; Bond (yellow card) 89'; Konchesky (yellow card) 90+2'	Stadium: Memorial Stadium; Attendance: 9,489; Referee: John Brooks

18 October 2016 13	Milton Keynes Dons	3–3	Bristol Rovers	Milton Keynes
19:45 BST	Bowditch 16' (yellow card) 31'; Williams 24'; Reeves 66'; Upson (yellow card) 71'; Lewington (yellow card) 73'	Report	Taylor 46', 87', 88'; Harrison (yellow card) 57'; Clarke (yellow card) 58'	Stadium: Stadium mk Attendance: 8,366; Referee: Darren Handley

22 October 2016 14	Oldham Athletic	0–2	Bristol Rovers	Oldham
15:00 BST	Flynn (yellow card) 57'	Report	Colkett 25'; Gaffney (yellow card) 80'; Clarke-Salter 87'	Stadium: Boundary Park; Attendance: 4,394; Referee: Seb Stockbridge

29 October 2016 15	Bristol Rovers	1–2	Peterborough United	Bristol
15:00 BST	Taylor 57' (pen.)	Report	Coulthirst 62' (yellow card) 67'; Bostwick (yellow card) 67'; Nichols 90+2'	Stadium: Memorial Stadium; Attendance: 9,839; Referee: Mark Haywood

1 November 2016 16	Bristol Rovers	2–1	Fleetwood Town	Bristol
19:45 GMT	Lines (yellow card) 50'; Taylor 61'; Montaño 73'	Report	Hunter 4' (yellow card) 9'; Bell (yellow card) 58'	Stadium: Memorial Stadium; Attendance: 10,088; Referee: Charles Breakspear

12 November 2016 17	Millwall	4–0	Bristol Rovers	Bermondsey, London
15:00 GMT	O'Brien 22'; Williams 64'; Gregory 68'; Onyedinma (yellow card) 86'; Smith 88'	Report	Leadbitter (red card) 14'; Hartley (yellow card) 75'	Stadium: The Den; Attendance: 9,645; Referee: Andrew Madley

19 November 2016 18	Bristol Rovers	0–0	Milton Keynes Dons	Bristol
15:00 GMT	Taylor (yellow card) 76'	Report	Baldock (yellow card) 49'; Agard (yellow card) 90+2'	Stadium: Memorial Stadium; Attendance: 9,031; Referee: Nigel Miller

22 November 2016 19	Bristol Rovers	1–5	Charlton Athletic	Bristol
19:45 GMT	Taylor 90+3' (pen.)	Report	Lookman 26'; Magennis 44'; Bauer 50' (yellow card) 79'; Chicksen (yellow card) 72' (goal) 77'; Ajose 85'; Phillips (yellow card) 90+3'	Stadium: Memorial Stadium; Attendance: 8,089; Referee: Simon Hooper

26 November 2016 20	Chesterfield	3–2	Bristol Rovers	Chesterfield
15:00 GMT	Dimaio (yellow card) 25'; Evatt 28'; Mitchell (yellow card) 31'; O'Shea 37', 50'	Report	Hartley 3'; Leadbitter (yellow card) 26'; Lockyer (yellow card) 45+1'; Lines (yellow card) 63'; Bodin 76'; Clarke (yellow card) 89'	Stadium: Proact Stadium; Attendance: 6,330; Referee: Andy Haines

10 December 2016 21	Bristol Rovers	4–2	Bury	Bristol
15:00 GMT	Gaffney 32'; Sinclair (yellow card) 41'; Taylor 45+2'; Clarke 67'; Hartley 82'	Report	Burgess 25'; Miller 75'; Danns (red card) 88'	Stadium: Memorial Stadium; Attendance: 7,843; Referee: Rob Jones

17 December 2016 22	Shrewsbury Town	2–0	Bristol Rovers	Shrewsbury
15:00 GMT	Dodds 16'; Brown (yellow card) 68'; Black 73' (pen.); Waring (yellow card) 84'	Report	Hartley (yellow card) 51'; Harrison (yellow card) 60'	Stadium: Greenhous Meadow; Attendance: 6,139; Referee: Seb Stockbridge

26 December 2016 23	Bristol Rovers	4–1	Coventry City	Bristol
15:00 GMT	Hartley 18'; Bodin (yellow card) 35' (goal) 54', 74', 83' (pen.); Clarke (yellow card) 58'	Report	Turnbull (yellow card) 18'; Willis 57'; Reid (yellow card) 72'; Page (yellow card) 78'	Stadium: Memorial Stadium; Attendance: 11,200; Referee: Brendan Malone

31 December 2016 24	Bristol Rovers	2–0	AFC Wimbledon	Bristol
15:00 GMT	Montaño (yellow card) 42'; Taylor 61', 70'; Clarke (yellow card) 86'	Report	Reeves (yellow card) 23'; Bulman (yellow card) 51'	Stadium: Memorial Stadium; Attendance: 10,093; Referee: Brett Huxtable

2 January 2017 25	Charlton Athletic	4–1	Bristol Rovers	Charlton, London
15:00 GMT	Fox (yellow card) 28'; Magennis 41', 50', 73'; Teixeira 61'; Chicksen (yellow card) 75'; Solly (yellow card) 81'	Report	Easter 12'; Brown (yellow card) 32'; Mansell (yellow card) 58'; Moore (yellow card) 67'	Stadium: The Valley; Attendance: 12,252; Referee: Darren Deadman

7 January 2017 26	Bristol Rovers	5–0	Northampton Town	Bristol
15:00 GMT	Bodin 7'; Harrison 17', 21', 24', 54'; McChrystal (yellow card) 45+1'	Report	Hoskins (yellow card) 67'	Stadium: Memorial Stadium; Attendance: 8,424; Referee: Gavin Ward

14 January 2017 27	Fleetwood Town	3–1	Bristol Rovers	Fleetwood
15:00 GMT	Hunter 13' (yellow card) 78'; Bolger 23'; Ball 82'	Report	Lockyer (yellow card) 45+1'; Bodin 54'; Lines (yellow card) 84'; James (yellow card) 90+3'	Stadium: Highbury Stadium; Attendance: 3,728; Referee: Darren England

21 January 2017 28	Walsall	3–1	Bristol Rovers	Walsall
15:00 GMT	O'Connell 45'; Jackson 68'; Edwards 73'	Report	Brown (yellow card) 22'; Taylor 82'	Stadium: The Banks's Stadium; Attendance: 6,029; Referee: Nigel Miller

28 January 2017 29	Bristol Rovers	1–0	Swindon Town	Bristol
12:30 GMT	Bodin 29'; Sweeney (yellow card) 35'	Report	Thompson (yellow card) 57'	Stadium: Memorial Stadium; Attendance: 10,557; Referee: James Linington

4 February 2017 30	Rochdale	0–0	Bristol Rovers	Rochdale
15:00 GMT	McNulty (yellow card) 62'; Camps (yellow card) 64'	Report	Lockyer (yellow card) 32'	Stadium: Spotland Stadium; Attendance: 3,168; Referee: Mark Brown

11 February 2017 31	Bristol Rovers	1–1	Bradford City	Bristol
15:00 GMT	Lines 15'; Sweeney (yellow card) 62'	Report	Law 26' (yellow card) 31'	Stadium: Memorial Stadium; Attendance: 9,043; Referee: Graham Salisbury

14 February 2017 32	Bristol Rovers	0–0	Sheffield United	Bristol
19:45 GMT		Report	Wright (yellow card) 69'	Stadium: Memorial Stadium; Attendance: 9,175; Referee: Kevin Johnson

18 February 2017 33	Port Vale	1–1	Bristol Rovers	Stoke-on-Trent
15:00 GMT	Harris 54' (o.g.); Knops (yellow card) 80'; Pugh (yellow card) 90+1'	Report	Sweeney (yellow card) 41'; Harris (yellow card) 42'; Harrison (yellow card) 45+1'; Bodin 78'	Stadium: Vale Park; Attendance: 4,460; Referee: Dean Whitestone

25 February 2017 34	Bristol Rovers	1–1	Scunthorpe United	Bristol
15:00 GMT	Clarke 39'	Report	Sutton (yellow card) 10'; Lockyer 73' (o.g.)	Stadium: Memorial Stadium; Attendance: 8,784; Referee: Darren Deadman

28 February 2017 35	Bolton Wanderers	1–1	Bristol Rovers	Bolton
20:00 GMT	Vela 7' (yellow card) 45+2'; Long (yellow card) 65' (yellow-red card) 90'; Osede (yellow card) 79'	Report	Bodin 75'; Clarke (yellow card) 90+4'	Stadium: Macron Stadium; Attendance: 13,383; Referee: Jeremy Simpson

4 March 2017 36	Oxford United	0–2	Bristol Rovers	Oxford
15:00 GMT	Dunkley (yellow card) 7'; Ledson (yellow card) 59'; Martínez (yellow card) 84'	Report	Clarke 16' (yellow card) 45+2'; Sinclair 36'; Brown (yellow card) 74'; Lumley (yellow card) 85'	Stadium: Kassam Stadium; Attendance: 9,862; Referee: Carl Boyeson

11 March 2017 37	Bristol Rovers	2–0	Southend United	Bristol
15:00 GMT	Bodin 1'; Gaffney 31'; Mansell (yellow card) 58'	Report	Atkinson (yellow card) 22'; Cox (yellow card) 73'; Demetriou (yellow card) 90+1'	Stadium: Memorial Stadium; Attendance: 9,274; Referee: Trevor Kettle

14 March 2017 38	Bury	3–0	Bristol Rovers	Bury
19:45 GMT	Tutte (yellow card) 14'; Vaughan 50' (pen.) (yellow card) 66'; Kay (yellow card) 53'; Leigh 65'; Miller 75'; Barnett (yellow card) 75'; Bryan (yellow card) 90'; Murphy (yellow card) 90+5'	Report	Sinclair (yellow card) 24' (yellow-red card) 39'; Gaffney (yellow card) 90+5'	Stadium: Gigg Lane; Attendance: 2,535; Referee: Ben Toner

18 March 2017 39	Bristol Rovers	2–1	Chesterfield	Bristol
15:00 GMT	Clarke 1'; Gaffney 18'; Sweeney (yellow card) 82'	Report	Dennis (yellow card) 20'; Nolan (yellow card) 67'; Dimaio (yellow card) 69'; Ebanks-Blake 85'	Stadium: Memorial Stadium; Attendance: 8,524; Referee: Darren Handley

25 March 2017 40	Coventry City	1–0	Bristol Rovers	Coventry
15:00	Thomas 80'; Bigirimana (yellow card) 90+5'	Report	Lockyer (yellow card) 37'; Leadbitter (yellow card) 65'	Stadium: Ricoh Arena; Attendance: 11,946; Referee: Graham Horwood

1 April 2017 41	Bristol Rovers	2–0	Shrewsbury Town	Bristol
15:00 BST	Bodin 54' (pen.), 83'	Report	Yates (yellow card) 22' (yellow-red card) 41'	Stadium: Memorial Stadium; Attendance: 9,498; Referee: Brett Huxtable

8 April 2017 42	AFC Wimbledon	0–1	Bristol Rovers	Kingston upon Thames, London
15:00 BST	Taylor (yellow card) 44'	Report	Bodin 1'; Sweeney (yellow card) 90+2'	Stadium: Kingsmeadow; Attendance: 4,742; Referee: Robert Jones

14 April 2017 43	Gillingham	3–1	Bristol Rovers	Gillingham
15:00 BST	Quigley (yellow card) 22'; Wright 64'; Oshilaja (yellow card) 73'; McDonald 90', 90+6'	Report	Harrison (yellow card) 38'; Mansell (yellow card) 48'; Bodin 73' (pen.)	Stadium: Priestfield Stadium; Attendance: 5,916; Referee: Mark Heywood

17 April 2017 44	Bristol Rovers	1–0	Oldham Athletic	Bristol
15:00 BST	Sinclair (yellow card) 63'; Harrison 75'	Report		Stadium: Memorial Stadium; Attendance: 9,083; Referee: Chris Sarginson

22 April 2017 45	Peterborough United	4–2	Bristol Rovers	Peterborough
15:00 BST	Lopes 13', 56'; Maddison 30'; Mackail-Smith 64'; Chettle (yellow card) 68'	Report	Harrison (penalty missed) 25'; Sweeney (yellow card) 45+1'; Lockyer (yellow card) 64'; Gaffney 85', 90+2'	Stadium: London Road Stadium; Attendance: 5,498; Referee: Richard Clark

30 April 2017 46	Bristol Rovers	3–4	Millwall	Bristol
12:00 BST	Easter 33'; Lines 42'; Bodin 74'	Report	Gregory 5', 35'; Craig (yellow card) 20' (goal) 25'; Hutchinson 85'; Morison (yellow card) 90+4'	Stadium: Memorial Stadium; Attendance: 11,750; Referee: Darren Handley

=== FA Cup ===
5 November 2016 First round	Crawley Town	1–1	Bristol Rovers	Crawley
12:00 GMT	Blackman (yellow card) 19' (yellow-red card) 69'; Smith (yellow card) 32'; Clifford 35'	Report	Brown 15'; Harrison (yellow card) 72'	Stadium: Checkatrade.com Stadium; Attendance: 2,281; Referee: Darren Deadman

15 November 2016 First round replay	Bristol Rovers	4–2 (a.e.t.)	Crawley Town	Bristol
19:45 GMT	Taylor 34', 102' (pen.); Gaffney 52', 96'	Report	Roberts 45+1'; Harrold 65'; Garnett (yellow card) 80'; Collins (yellow card) 114'	Stadium: Memorial Stadium; Attendance: 3,676; Referee: Ben Toner

4 December 2016 Second round	Bristol Rovers	1–2	Barrow	Bristol
14:00 GMT	Gaffney 10'	Report	Harrison 16', 61'; Bennett (yellow card) 38'; Yates (yellow card) 55'	Stadium: Memorial Stadium; Attendance: 4,570; Referee: Dean Whitestone

=== EFL Cup ===
On 22 June 2016, the first round draw for the EFL Cup was made. Rovers were drawn at home to Championship side Cardiff City, managed by former Rovers boss Paul Trollope. The game was later picked for live broadcast by Sky Sports. Rovers progressed to the second round thanks to a 115th-minute winner from Chris Lines to set up a trip to Premier League side Chelsea.

11 August 2016 First round	Bristol Rovers	1–0 (a.e.t.)	Cardiff City	Memorial Stadium
19:45 BST	Lockyer (yellow card) 90+1'; Lines 115'	Report	Manga (yellow card) 100'	Attendance: 4,851; Referee: Chris Kavanagh

23 August 2016 Second round	Chelsea	3–2	Bristol Rovers	Stamford Bridge
19:45 BST	Batshuayi 29', 41'; Moses 31'; Pedro (yellow card) 48'	Report	Hartley 35'; Harrison 48' (pen.); Easter (yellow card) 71'; Taylor (yellow card) 86'	Attendance: 39,266

=== EFL Trophy ===
On 27 July 2016, the group stage draw for the EFL Trophy was made. Rovers were drawn in Southern Group A along with Reading Academy, Portsmouth and Yeovil Town.

Pos	Div	Team	Pld	W	PW	PL	L	GF	GA	GD	Pts	Qualification
1	L2	Yeovil Town	3	2	0	1	0	6	3	+3	7	Advance to Round 2
2	ACA	Reading U21	3	1	1	0	1	5	6	−1	5	Advance to Round 2
3	L2	Portsmouth	3	1	0	1	1	6	6	0	4	
4	L1	Bristol Rovers	3	0	1	0	2	2	4	−2	2	

Source: Sky Sports

30 August 2016 Southern Group A	Bristol Rovers	2–3	Reading Academy	Memorial Stadium
19:45 BST	Taylor 60'; Gaffney (yellow card) 73'; Easter (yellow card) 74' (goal) 81'; Roos (yellow card) 77'; Lines (yellow card) 83'; Mildenhall (yellow card) 90+4'		Stacey 33'; Samuel (yellow card) 59'; Watson (yellow card) 72'; Sheppard 76'; Mendes 84' (pen.)

4 October 2016 Southern Group A	Bristol Rovers	0–0 (5–3 p)	Yeovil Town	Memorial Stadium
19:45 BST	Clarke (yellow card) 88'; Colkett (yellow card) 90+4'	Report	Lawless (yellow card) 63'; Dawson (yellow card) 74' (yellow-red card) 74'; Mugabi (yellow card) 90+4'	Attendance: 2,117; Referee: James Adcock
	Penalties
	James (penalty scored); Bodin (penalty scored); Taylor (penalty scored); Colkett (penalty scored); Montaño (penalty scored)		Dickson (penalty scored); Hedges (penalty missed); McLeod (penalty scored); Lawless (penalty scored)

8 November 2016 Southern Group A	Portsmouth	1–0	Bristol Rovers	Portsmouth
19:45 GMT	Smith (penalty missed) 6'; Bennett (yellow card) 37'; Davies (yellow card) 59'; Naismith 88'	Report	Mansell (yellow card) 56'; McChrystal (yellow card) 72'	Stadium: Fratton Park; Attendance: 1,200; Referee: Nick Kinseley

== See also ==
- 2016–17 in English football
- 2016–17 Football League One
- List of Bristol Rovers F.C. seasons
