= Thom Jonkerman =

Dutch footballer

Personal information
- Full name: Thom Anthony Walter Jonkerman
- Date of birth: March 1, 1998 (age 28)
- Place of birth: Netherlands
- Position: Goalkeeper

Senior career*
Years	Team	Apps	(Gls)
-2016	FC Dordrecht	0	(0)
2017-2018	Bristol Rovers F.C.	0	(0)
2017	→ Mangotsfield United F.C. (loan)		
2017-2018	→ Cirencester Town F.C. (loan)	11	(0)
2018-2019	FC Lienden	18	(0)
2019-	FC Eindhoven	3	(0)
- * Club domestic league appearances and goals

Thom Anthony Walter Jonkerman (born 1 March 1998 in the Netherlands) is a Dutch footballer.

== Career ==
In 2016, Jonkerman joined the Nike Academy in England after failing to make an appearance for Dutch second division side Dordrecht.

In 2017, he signed for Bristol Rovers in the English third division side after an unsuccessful trial with Arsenal, England's most successful club.

In 2017, he was sent on loan to Mangotsfield United in the English eighth division.

In 2018, Jonkerman was sent on loan to English seventh division outfit Cirencester Town.

In 2018, he signed for Lienden in the Dutch third division.

In 2019, he signed for Dutch second division team Eindhoven.
