= Jonny Burn =

English footballer

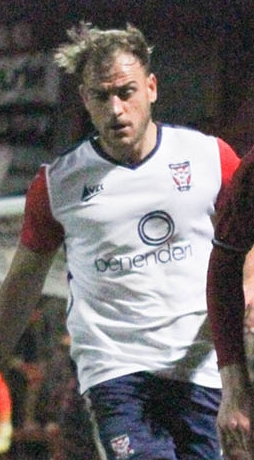
- Burn playing for York City in 2018

Personal information
- Full name: Jonathan David Burn
- Date of birth: 1 August 1995 (age 31)
- Place of birth: Darlington, England
- Height: 6 ft 0 in (1.84 m)
- Position: Centre back

Team information
- Current team: Darlington Town

Youth career
- –2013: Sunderland
- 2013–2014: Middlesbrough

Senior career*
Years	Team	Apps	(Gls)
2014–2017	Middlesbrough	0	(0)
2015–2016	→ Oldham Athletic (loan)	12	(1)
2016	→ Kilmarnock (loan)	8	(0)
2017–2018	Bristol Rovers	3	(0)
2017–2018	→ York City (loan)	20	(3)
2018–2019	Darlington	17	(0)
2019–2020	Whickham		
2020–2023	Whitby Town	36	(1)
2022	→ Northallerton Town (loan)	1	(0)
2024–	Darlington Town	0	(0)
- * Club domestic league appearances and goals as of 12:20, 8 July 2024 (UTC)

Jonathan David Burn (born 1 August 1995) is an English professional footballer who plays as a centre back for Northern League Division Two club Darlington Town. He has played in the Football League for Oldham Athletic and Bristol Rovers and in the Scottish Premiership for Kilmarnock. Burn also has National League North experience with York City and Darlington, and played for Whickham in the Northern League Division One.

== Early life ==
Burn was born in Darlington, County Durham and attended Longfield School in the town.

== Career ==
=== Early career ===
Burn began his career with the Sunderland academy at the age of 13 before joining Middlesbrough in March 2013. He signed a professional contract with the club in May 2014. During the 2014/2015 season Burn captained the Middlesbrough Under 21 team to win the treble, they won the Under 21 Premier League, Final Third Development Cup and The North Riding Senior Cup

On 3 August 2015, Burn joined League One club Oldham Athletic on loan until 1 January 2016. He made his first-team debut on 8 August 2015, starting in a 1–1 draw away to Walsall. He scored his first goal on 19 September 2015, with a header in the 34th minute of a 1–1 draw away to Doncaster Rovers.

On 24 June 2016, Burn moved on loan to Scottish Premiership club Kilmarnock. He made his debut on 23 July 2016, as Kilmarnock lost 2–0 at home to Greenock Morton in the Scottish League Cup.

=== Bristol Rovers ===
Burn signed for League One club Bristol Rovers on 26 January 2017. He made his debut on 18 February 2017 in a 1–1 draw away to Port Vale, coming on as a half-time substitute for Tom Lockyer. He made his first start in a 1–0 defeat to Coventry City on 25 March 2017, and his performance drew praise from the Bristol Post, describing him as a "more than able deputy for the absent [Ryan] Sweeney".

On 28 November 2017, Burn joined National League North club York City on loan until 6 January 2018. He made his debut on 2 December 2017, starting in a 2–1 away defeat to Boston United. Burn scored his first goal for York on 26 December 2017 with a 12-yard shot in a 4–1 away victory over North Ferriby United. Having made five appearances and scored one goal, his loan was extended to the end of the 2017–18 season. He finished the loan with 21 appearances and three goals as York finished 11th in the table.

He was released by Bristol Rovers at the end of the 2017–18 season.

=== Non-League ===
Burn signed for his hometown club, Darlington of the National League North, on 22 June 2018. In his first season he played 17 times, all in league competition, but left the club by mutual consent in October 2019 having failed to add to his appearance tally.

Burn signed for Northern League club Whickham on 15 October 2019. He made 12 appearances in all competitions before the season was cut short because of COVID-19.

In June 2020, Burn signed for Northern Premier League Premier Division club Whitby Town.

Burn joined Northallerton Town on 2 November 2022 on a month's loan.

Burn departed Whitby Town at the end of the 2022–23 season.

Following a break from football, Burn joined newly promoted Northern League Division Two side Darlington Town in June 2024.

== Career statistics ==
As of match played 2 November 2022

Appearances and goals by club, season and competition
Club	Season	League			National Cup		League Cup (Note: Includes Football League Cup / EFL Cup, Scottish League Cup)		Other		Total	
Club	Season	Division	Apps	Goals	Apps	Goals	Apps	Goals	Apps	Goals	Apps	Goals
Middlesbrough	2015–16	Championship	0	0	0	0	—		—		0	0
Middlesbrough	2016–17	Premier League	0	0	0	0	—		—		0	0
Middlesbrough	Total		0	0	0	0	—		—		0	0
Oldham Athletic (loan)	2015–16	League One	12	1	0	0	0	0	0	0	12	1
Kilmarnock (loan)	2016–17	Scottish Premiership	8	0	—		2	0	—		10	0
Bristol Rovers	2016–17	League One	2	0	—		—		—		2	0
Bristol Rovers	2017–18	League One	1	0	0	0	0	0	3 (Note: Appearances in EFL Trophy)	0	4	0
Bristol Rovers	Total		3	0	0	0	0	0	3	0	6	0
York City (loan)	2017–18	National League North	20	3	—		—		1 (Note: Appearance in FA Trophy)	0	21	3
Darlington	2018–19	National League North	17	0	0	0	—		0	0	17	0
Darlington	2019–20	National League North	0	0	0	0	—		—		0	0
Darlington	Total		17	0	0	0	—		0	0	17	0
Whickham	2019–20	Northern League Division One					—				12	
Whitby Town	2020–21	Northern Premier League (NPL); Premier Division	6	0	0	0	—		1	0	7	0
Whitby Town	2021–22	NPL Premier Division	22	1	3	0	—		3 (Note: One appearance in FA Trophy, two in North Riding Senior Cup)	0	28	1
Whitby Town	2022–23	NPL Premier Division	8	0	1	0	—		1	0	10	0
Whitby Town	Total		36	1	4	0	—		5	0	45	1
Northallerton Town (loan)	2022–23	Northern League Division One	1	0	—		—		0	0	1	0
Career total			97	5	4	0	2	0	9	0	124	5
