= Joe Partington =

English footballer (born 1990)

Personal information
- Full name: Joseph Michael Partington
- Date of birth: 1 April 1990 (age 36)
- Place of birth: Portsmouth, England
- Height: 6 ft 2 in (1.88 m)
- Position: Defender

Youth career
- 2001–2006: Portsmouth
- 2006–2007: AFC Bournemouth

Senior career*
| Years | Team | Apps | (Gls) |
| 2007–2015 | AFC Bournemouth | 52 | (2) |
| 2010 | → Eastbourne Borough (loan) | 4 | (0) |
| 2014 | → Aldershot Town (loan) | 8 | (1) |
| 2015 | → Eastleigh (loan) | 17 | (2) |
| 2015–2017 | Eastleigh | 64 | (4) |
| 2017–2019 | Bristol Rovers | 53 | (3) |
| 2019–2021 | Eastleigh | 65 | (0) |
| 2021–2022 | Bromley | 28 | (0) |
| 2022–2023 | Aldershot Town | 33 | (3) |
| 2023 | Farnborough | 10 | (0) |
| 2023–2024 | St Albans City | 42 | (0) |
| 2024–2025 | Worthing | 20 | (1) |
| Total | | 396 | (16) |

International career^{‡}
| 2006–2007 | Wales U17 | 2 | (0) |
| 2007–2008 | Wales U19 | 11 | (2) |
| 2009–2012 | Wales U21 | 8 | (0) |
- * Club domestic league appearances and goals as of 12:41, 12 May 2025 (UTC) ‡ National team caps and goals as of 5 March 2012

Joseph Michael Partington (born 1 April 1990) is a former professional footballer who played as a defender. At under-21 level, Partington represented Wales on eight occasions between 2009 and 2012.

== Club career ==
Born in Portsmouth, Partington joined AFC Bournemouth in June 2006 after being released by Portsmouth. He made his first team debut for Bournemouth on 9 February 2008, against Luton Town. Bournemouth won the game 4–1. Partington came on as a late substitute for Marvin Bartley.

On 5 April, Partington scored his first professional goal. This was a crucial goal at the Liberty Stadium in the 90th minute against top of the league side Swansea City. Moments after, Bournemouth scored another goal from Jo Kuffour to win the game 2–1. The goal scored against Swansea when he was 18 years 4 days old means he is currently the youngest player to score for Bournemouth in their history.

On 7 May, Bournemouth manager Kevin Bond announced he had offered Partington, along with youth team goalkeeper Ryan Pryce and winger Josh McQuoid a professional contract with the club. Partington made his full first team début against Bury on 20 December, scoring Bournemouth's second goal of the game in the 44th minute.

On 29 October 2010, Partington joined Eastbourne Borough of the Conference National on an initial one-month's loan in order to gain some first team experience.

The then Bournemouth manager Lee Bradbury offered Partington a new and improved two-and-a-half-year contract on 4 February 2011 which he accepted. This will keep him at the club until the end of the 2012–13 season.

Partington's contract was extended by a further two years in June 2013 by current manager Eddie Howe who has stated that he is keen for Partington to convert to a centre half. To assist him in this on 1 January 2014 he signed for Conference Premier team Aldershot Town on a month's loan after turning down two League clubs who wanted to sign him as a central midfielder. He suffered an injury in a match against Dartford which required an operation to reconstruct his knee and kept him out for ten months.

Partington signed for Eastleigh in January 2015, after recovering from a knee injury, on an initial one-month loan, which was extended until the end of the 2014–15 season.

On 4 June 2015, Partington joined Eastleigh on a free transfer on a two-year deal after Bournemouth released him. On 25 July 2016 Eastleigh manager Chris Todd persuaded Partington to sign an extension to his contract that will keep him at the club until July 2018. Partington was also made captain of the first team for the 2016/17 season. This came after the fans of the club and his teammates presented him with all four of the 2015/16 end of season awards.

On 13 January 2017, Partington joined League One side Bristol Rovers for an undisclosed fee, although Eastleigh stated that the fee that they received for Partington was a new club record. He made his debut for the club replacing Mark McChrystal in the second half of a 3–1 defeat to Fleetwood Town.

He was offered a new contract by Bristol Rovers at the end of the 2018–19 season.

On 13 June 2019, Partington returned to Eastleigh after rejecting a new contract at Bristol Rovers to allow him to focus on a new business, providing fitness camps for footballers in Hampshire. After the 2020/21 season, Partington departed Eastleigh after declining to sign a new contract with the club.

On 1 July 2021, Partington joined Bromley. On 22 May 2022, Partington came on as a substitute in a 1–0 victory over Wrexham in the FA Trophy Final.

On 17 June 2022, Partington returned to former club Aldershot Town on a two-year deal having spent time on loan with them eight years prior.

On 22 June 2023, following a mutual agreement to terminate his contract with Aldershot due to him taking fulltime employment with a global company, Partington agreed to join National League South side, Farnborough. He departed the club in October 2023 after his contract was terminated by mutual consent. He joined St Albans City two days after his Farnborough departure.

On 9 December 2024, Partington joined fellow National League South side Worthing.

He announced his retirement from football at the end of the 2024–25 season.

== International career ==
Partington chose to play for Wales, qualifying through his Welsh mother. He made his debut for the Wales under-19 team in July 2007 against Chile. Aged only 17 years and 4 months he was made captain of the Welsh under-19 team for the game against Turkey in the Milk Cup and has captained his country at this level nine times since. His first Welsh goal came in a 3–1 defeat against Hungary.

On 2 February 2009, Partington was called up to the Wales under-21 squad for the first time by manager Brian Flynn for a friendly against Northern Ireland on 10 February. Because the match was cancelled, he made his under-21 debut on 31 March 2009 against Luxembourg at Llanelli's Parc y Scarlets. Partington captained the Welsh under-21s for the first time on 17 November 2010 in a 1–0 win against Austria.

== Punditry career ==
Following his retirement, Partington joined BBC Radio Solent as summariser for the channel's coverage on AFC Bournemouth.

== Personal life ==
Partington hosts the Leave No Doubt podcast which provides guidance on how to become a professional footballer, calling upon the advice of elite coaches and players. Launched in February 2022, the first episode saw Partington speak with former Arsenal and England international midfielder Jack Wilshere on how to maximise your potential.

== Career statistics ==
As of end of 2024–25 season

Appearances and goals by club, season and competition
| Club | Season | League | | | FA Cup | | League Cup | | Other | | Total | |
| Club | Season | Division | Apps | Goals | Apps | Goals | Apps | Goals | Apps | Goals | Apps | Goals |
|---|---|---|---|---|---|---|---|---|---|---|---|---|
| AFC Bournemouth | 2007–08 | League One | 6 | 1 | 0 | 0 | 0 | 0 | 0 | 0 | 6 | 1 |
| AFC Bournemouth | 2008–09 | League Two | 11 | 1 | 1 | 0 | 0 | 0 | 1 (Note: Appearances in the Football League Trophy) | 0 | 13 | 1 |
| AFC Bournemouth | 2009–10 | League Two | 11 | 0 | 0 | 0 | 0 | 0 | 0 | 0 | 11 | 0 |
| AFC Bournemouth | 2010–11 | League One | 5 | 0 | 0 | 0 | 0 | 0 | 0 | 0 | 5 | 0 |
| AFC Bournemouth | 2011–12 | League One | 5 | 0 | 0 | 0 | 0 | 0 | 1 | 0 | 6 | 0 |
| AFC Bournemouth | 2012–13 | League One | 14 | 0 | 2 | 0 | 1 | 0 | 1 | 0 | 18 | 0 |
| AFC Bournemouth | Total | | 52 | 2 | 3 | 0 | 1 | 0 | 3 | 0 | 59 | 2 |
| Eastbourne Borough (loan) | 2010–11 | Conference Premier | 4 | 0 | 0 | 0 | ~ | ~ | 0 | 0 | 4 | 0 |
| Aldershot Town (loan) | 2013–14 | Conference Premier | 8 | 1 | 0 | 0 | ~ | ~ | 2 (Note: Appearances in the FA Trophy) | 0 | 10 | 1 |
| Eastleigh (loan) | 2014–15 | Conference Premier | 17 | 2 | 0 | 0 | ~ | ~ | 2 (Note: Appearances in the Conference Premier play-offs) | 0 | 19 | 2 |
| Eastleigh | 2015–16 | National League | 43 | 2 | 5 | 1 | ~ | ~ | 2 | 0 | 50 | 3 |
| Eastleigh | 2016–17 | National League | 21 | 2 | 4 | 0 | ~ | ~ | 0 | 0 | 25 | 2 |
| Eastleigh | Total | | 81 | 6 | 9 | 1 | ~ | ~ | 4 | 0 | 94 | 7 |
| Bristol Rovers | 2016–17 | League One | 7 | 0 | 0 | 0 | 0 | 0 | 0 | 0 | 7 | 0 |
| Bristol Rovers | 2017–18 | League One | 32 | 3 | 1 | 0 | 2 | 0 | 2 (Note: Appearance in the EFL Trophy) | 0 | 37 | 3 |
| Bristol Rovers | 2018–19 | League One | 14 | 0 | 1 | 0 | 0 | 0 | 4 | 0 | 19 | 0 |
| Bristol Rovers | Total | | 53 | 3 | 2 | 0 | 2 | 0 | 6 | 0 | 63 | 3 |
| Eastleigh | 2019–20 | National League | 35 | 0 | 2 | 0 | – | | 1 | 0 | 38 | 0 |
| Eastleigh | 2020–21 | National League | 30 | 0 | 1 | 0 | — | | 1 | 0 | 32 | 0 |
| Eastleigh | Total | | 65 | 0 | 3 | 0 | 0 | 0 | 2 | 0 | 70 | 0 |
| Bromley | 2021–22 | National League | 28 | 0 | 1 | 0 | — | | 6 | 1 | 35 | 1 |
| Aldershot Town | 2022–23 | National League | 33 | 3 | 0 | 0 | — | | 4 | 0 | 37 | 3 |
| Farnborough | 2023–24 | National League South | 10 | 0 | 3 | 1 | — | | 0 | 0 | 13 | 1 |
| St Albans City | 2023–24 | National League South | 28 | 0 | 0 | 0 | — | | 1 | 0 | 29 | 0 |
| St Albans City | 2024–25 | National League South | 14 | 0 | 1 | 0 | — | | 0 | 0 | 15 | 0 |
| St Albans City | Total | | 42 | 0 | 1 | 0 | 0 | 0 | 1 | 0 | 44 | 0 |
| Worthing | 2024–25 | National League South | 20 | 1 | 0 | 0 | — | | 3 (Note: Two appearances and one goal in FA Trophy, one appearance in National League South play-offs) | 1 | 23 | 2 |
| Career total | | | 396 | 16 | 22 | 2 | 3 | 0 | 31 | 2 | 451 | 20 |

== Honours ==
AFC Bournemouth

- EFL League Two runners-up: 2009–10

Bromley

- FA Trophy Winners: 2021–22
