= Mohammad Baghdadi =

German footballer (born 1996)

Personal information
- Date of birth: 30 October 1996 (age 30)
- Place of birth: Hanover, Germany
- Height: 1.79 m (5 ft 10 in)
- Positions: Left midfielder; left-back

Team information
- Current team: VfV 06 Hildesheim
- Number: 7

Youth career
- DJK TuS Marathon Hannover
- SV Kleeblatt Stöcken
- –2012: SC Langenhagen
- 2012–2014: Eintracht Braunschweig

Senior career*
| Years | Team | Apps | (Gls) |
| 2014–2017 | Eintracht Braunschweig II | 38 | (0) |
| 2014–2016 | Eintracht Braunschweig | 1 | (0) |
| 2017–2019 | Bristol Rovers | 2 | (0) |
| 2017 | → Dorchester Town (loan) | 14 | (7) |
| 2018 | → Poole Town (loan) | 7 | (1) |
| 2018 | → Weston-super-Mare (loan) | 7 | (1) |
| 2018 | → Bath City (loan) | 1 | (0) |
| 2019 | Eintracht Norderstedt | 3 | (0) |
| 2019– | VfV 06 Hildesheim | 161 | (17) |
- * Club domestic league appearances and goals as of 30 June 2026

Mohammad Baghdadi (born 30 October 1996) is a German professional footballer who plays as a left midfielder or left-back for German club VfV 06 Hildesheim.

== Career ==
=== Eintracht Braunschweig ===
Baghdadi joined the youth academy of Eintracht Braunschweig in 2012 from SC Langenhagen. In 2014, he was promoted to the club's senior team. On the final matchday of the 2014–15 2. Bundesliga season, he made his professional debut for Eintracht, coming on in the 73rd minute in a match against 1. FC Union Berlin.

=== Bristol Rovers ===
On 1 July 2017, Baghdadi joined EFL League One side Bristol Rovers. On 5 January 2018, Baghdadi joined National League South side Poole Town on an initial one-month loan after spending time on loan at Southern Football League side Dorchester Town. His loan was then extended for a further month. After making seven league appearances, he then joined fellow National League South side Weston-super-Mare on loan for a month.

Baghdadi was recalled by Bristol Rovers on 10 April and made his senior debut for the club on 14 April in a 1–1 draw against Blackburn Rovers, coming on as a substitute for Byron Moore in the 77th minute.

On 16 November 2018, he joined National League South side Bath City on a one-month loan deal.

On 25 January 2019, Baghdadi's contract with Bristol was terminated by mutual consent.

=== Eintracht Norderstedt ===
On 28 January 2019, Baghdadi joined FC Eintracht Norderstedt 03 on a contract until June 2020.

=== VfV 06 Hildesheim ===
Ahead of the 2019–20 season, Baghdadi left Eintracht Norderstedt to join VfV 06 Hildesheim.

== Personal life ==
Born in Germany, Baghdadi holds both German and Lebanese citizenship.
