= Tom Parkes =

English footballer (born 1992)

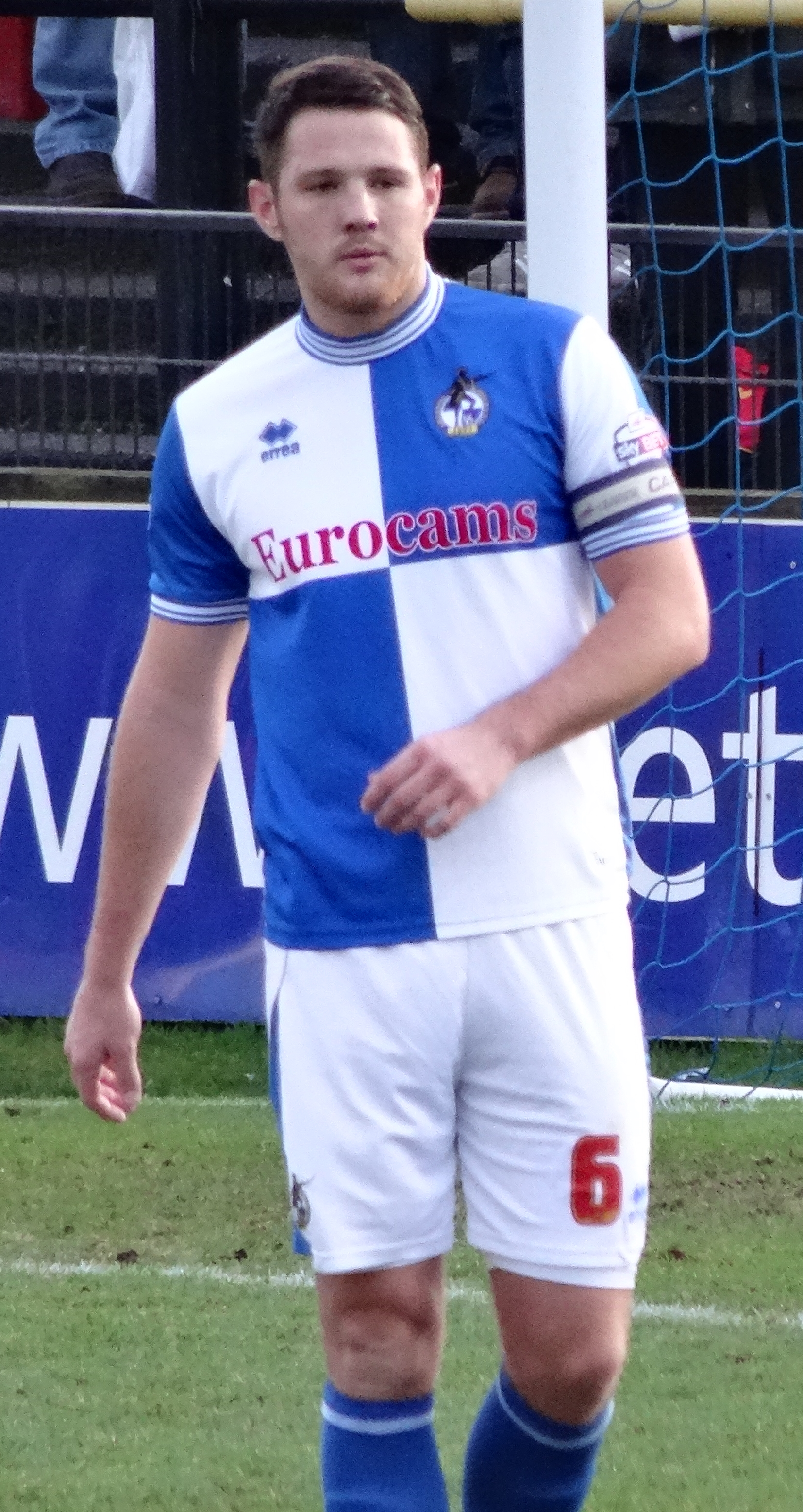
- Parkes playing for Bristol Rovers in 2014

Personal information
- Full name: Thomas Peter Wilson Parkes
- Date of birth: 15 January 1992 (age 34)
- Place of birth: Sutton-in-Ashfield, England
- Height: 6 ft 3 in (1.91 m)
- Position: Defender

Team information
- Current team: Tamworth
- Number: 5

Youth career
- 2006–2010: Leicester City

Senior career*
Years	Team	Apps	(Gls)
2010–2012	Leicester City	0	(0)
2010	→ Burton Albion (loan)	22	(1)
2010–2011	→ Yeovil Town (loan)	1	(0)
2011	→ Burton Albion (loan)	5	(0)
2011–2012	→ Burton Albion (loan)	4	(0)
2012	→ Bristol Rovers (loan)	14	(0)
2012–2016	Bristol Rovers	161	(6)
2016–2017	Leyton Orient	41	(1)
2017–2019	Carlisle United	76	(2)
2019–2021	Exeter City	62	(3)
2021–2024	Livingston	21	(1)
2024–2026	Hartlepool United	90	(3)
2026–	Tamworth	1	(0)

International career
2008–2009	England U17	18	(1)
2014–2015	England C	2	(0)
- * Club domestic league appearances and goals as of 22:00, 9 September 2026 (UTC)

Thomas Peter Wilson Parkes (born 15 January 1992) is an English professional footballer who plays as a defender for National League club Tamworth. He plays mainly a centre-back, he can also be deployed as a left-back.

Born in Sutton-in-Ashfield, he started his career with Leicester City. He had four loan spells with Burton Albion and one each with Yeovil Town and Bristol Rovers. He moved to Bristol Rovers permanently in 2012 where he won two promotions and was named as the club's Player of the Year and was included in the Conference Team of the Year for the 2014–15 season. He left in 2016 for Leyton Orient and then spent two seasons with Carlisle United. He moved to Exeter City in 2019. He spent two years with Exeter and moved to Scottish side Livingston in 2021. After three seasons with Livingston, he returned to England, signing with Hartlepool United in 2024.

== Club career ==
=== Leicester City ===
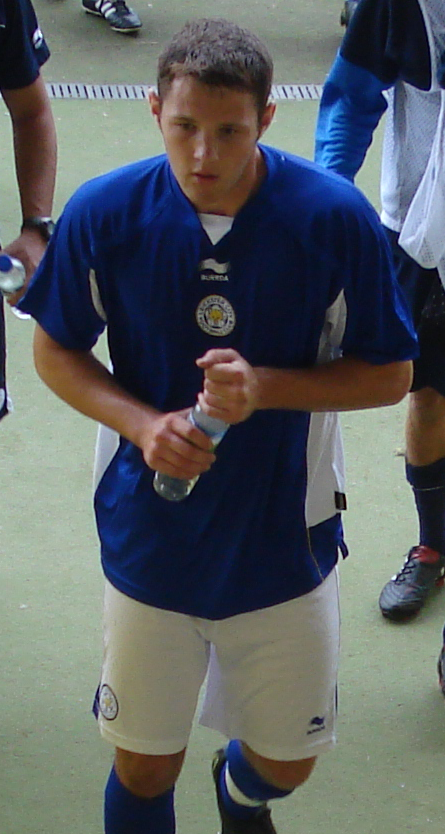
Parkes with Leicester City in 2010

Born in Sutton-in-Ashfield, Nottinghamshire, Parkes started his career at Leicester City where he is a product of their youth academy. Parkes' first involvement with Leicester's first team came when he was named as an unused substitute as Leicester beat Swansea City 2–1 at the Walkers Stadium in the third round of the FA Cup.

==== Loan spells ====
On 22 January 2010 Parkes joined Burton Albion on a one-month loan deal to help ease their injury crisis, making his debut the following day, playing the full 90 minutes of Burton's 2–3 come back win away at Torquay United. On 30 January, Parkes agreed to extend his loan at Burton until the end of the 2009–10 season.

On 1 December 2010, Parkes secured a loan move to League One side Yeovil Town until January 2011 Parkes made two appearances for the club the first being a 0–0 draw against Colchester United in a Football League One match. The second was a 4–2 defeat to Hartlepool United in the FA Cup.

On 24 March 2011, Parkes joined Burton Albion on loan for a second time until the end of the 2010–11 season.

Parkes joined Burton Albion on a sixth month loan deal at the start of the 2011–12 season. However this came to a premature end after only three league games after Parkes suffered a broken ankle. He made his return by being named on the bench on 14 January 2012 in a match against Plymouth Argyle.

Following the end of his loan at Burton Albion, Parkes was an unused substitute for Leicester's 2–0 victory over Swindon Town in the fourth round of the FA Cup. A few days later, Parkes joined up with fellow Leicester loanee Cian Bolger, at Bristol Rovers on an initial month-long loan deal. Parkes made his debut against Morecambe on 11 February, re-uniting his academy defensive partnership with Bolger. On 21 April, he was sent off for a dangerous two footed challenge on Port Vale's Chris Shuker; opposition manager Micky Adams defended Parkes, saying that in his experience "the boy is not that type of player".

=== Bristol Rovers ===
Tom Parkes joined Bristol Rovers for an undisclosed fee on 20 August 2012. He made his debut on 21 August 2012 in a 1–1 draw against Barnet, playing the full 90 minutes. On 18 September 2012, he scored his first goal for in a Rovers shirt in away match against west country rivals Plymouth Argyle.

On 20 November 2012, he suffered a fractured ankle in a 4–0 loss away at Port Vale at Vale Park and returned to action on 1 December 2012 in the 2–0 loss to Wycombe.

When John Ward was appointed manager in December 2012, Parkes was awarded the captain's armband and picked up the League Two Player of the Month award for February 2013.

In September 2013, Parkes agreed a contract extension at Rovers to keep him at the club until 2016. That season would end in disappointment for Parks and Rovers as the club were relegated out of the Football League for the first time since their election in 1920.

Parkes remained with Rovers for their first campaign in the Conference Premier as Darrell Clarke guided the side to a second place finish in the league, missing out on automatic promotion by just one point. They would however go on to seal promotion at Wembley Stadium, beating Grimsby Town in the 2015 Conference Premier play-off final. Parkes made 51 appearances in all competitions during the season, the most of any player at the club, and was named Bristol Rovers' Player of the Year at the end of the campaign.

The 2015–16 season saw Parkes struggle to hold down a regular place in the side as Mark McChrystal and Tom Lockyer were generally favoured in the centre back positions. Rovers went on to secure back-to-back promotions to League One following a 92nd minute winning goal from Lee Brown. Parkes, along with the rest of Rovers' senior players, was offered a new deal at the club.

=== Leyton Orient ===
On 15 June 2016, Parkes agreed a two-year contract with League Two club Leyton Orient, turning down the offer of a new contract at Bristol Rovers. He scored once in 44 appearances in all competitions across the 2016–17 season, as the club finished bottom of League Two and were relegated to the National League.

=== Carlisle United ===
On 4 July 2017, Parkes joined Carlisle United on a two-year deal. He was offered a new contract by Carlisle at the end of the 2018–19 season.

=== Exeter City ===
On 27 May 2019, Parkes joined Exeter City. In August 2019 he received a three-match ban for violent conduct. He scored his first goal for the club in the 4–0 win against local rivals Plymouth Argyle.

On 12 May 2021 it was announced that he would leave Exeter at the end of the season, following the expiry of his contract.

=== Livingston ===
On 3 June 2021, Parkes agreed to join Livingston following the expiration of his Exeter contract, signing a one-year contract with the potential to rise to three years. Parkes scored one minute into his competitive debut for the club, when he opened the scoring in an eventual 3–0 victory over Brechin City.

=== Hartlepool United ===
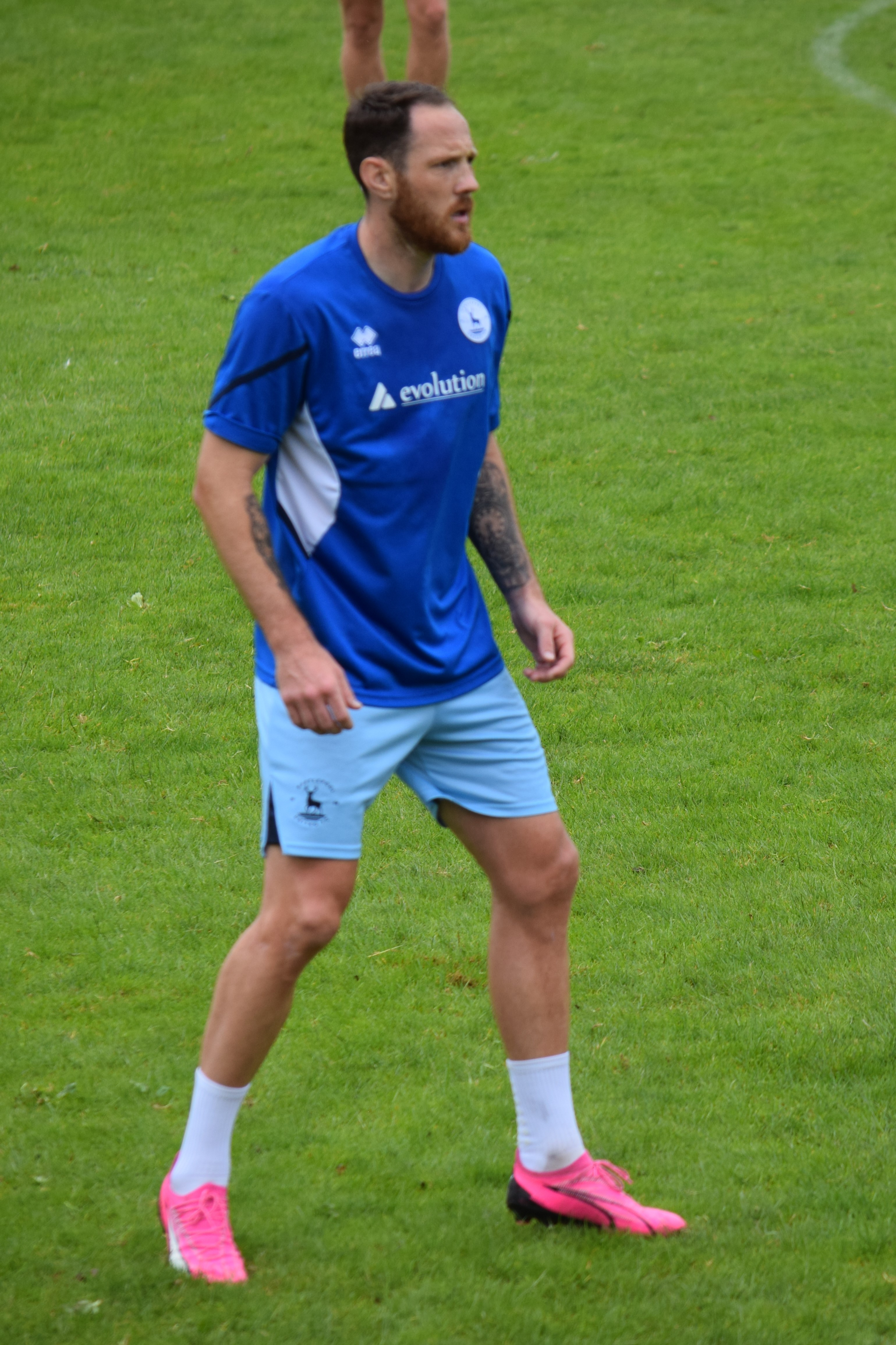
Parkes warming up with Hartlepool United in 2024

On 8 January 2024, Parkes signed for National League club Hartlepool United. He made his Hartlepool debut the following day as a half-time substitute in a 2–1 defeat to AFC Fylde. Early in his Hartlepool career he formed a strong partnership with Luke Waterfall in central defence. On 6 April, Parkes scored his first Hartlepool goal in a 2–0 home win against Aldershot Town.

At the end of the season, Hartlepool took the option to extend his contract. On 30 November, Parkes made his 500th career appearance in a 0–0 home draw with Barnet. On 14 January 2025, he signed a new contract extension to keep him with the club until the end of the 2025–26 season. He was named as Hartlepool's club captain ahead of the 2025–26 season.

He departed the club upon the expiry of his contract at the end of the 2025–26 season.

=== Tamworth ===
On 26 June 2026, Tamworth announced the signing of Parkes, signing on the same day as Tyler Lyttle. Parkes made his debut for Tamworth on 18 August 2026, in a National League Cup fixture at home to Newcastle United. He assisted Jake Hutchinson to a 19th minute goal, as Tamworth won the fixture 5–3. Parkes made his National League debut for Tamworth on 22 August 2026 in an away fixture against FC Halifax Town. He again provided an assist, this time for TJ Bramble who scored a 76th minute consolation goal in a 4–1 defeat.

== International career ==
At international level, Parkes has represented England at under-17 level 18 times, scoring once. Parkes was a member of the unsuccessful England Under-17 squad for the 2009 UEFA European Under-17 Football Championship.

== Personal life ==
Parkes was prosecuted in July 2016 for drink driving after crashing his stepfather's car in the Leamington area of Sutton-in-Ashfield.

== Career statistics ==
As of 9 September 2026

Appearances and goals by club, season and competition
Club	Season	League			National Cup (Note: Includes FA Cup)		League Cup (Note: Includes EFL Cup, Scottish League Cup)		Other		Total	
Club	Season	Division	Apps	Goals	Apps	Goals	Apps	Goals	Apps	Goals	Apps	Goals
Leicester City	2009–10	Championship	0	0	0	0	0	0	0	0	0	0
Leicester City	2010–11	Championship	0	0	0	0	0	0	—		0	0
Leicester City	2011–12	Championship	0	0	0	0	0	0	—		0	0
Leicester City	Total		0	0	0	0	0	0	0	0	0	0
Burton Albion (loan)	2009–10	League Two	22	1	0	0	0	0	0	0	22	1
Yeovil Town (loan)	2010–11	League One	1	0	1	0	0	0	0	0	2	0
Burton Albion (loan)	2010–11	League Two	5	0	0	0	0	0	0	0	5	0
Burton Albion (loan)	2011–12	League Two	4	0	0	0	0	0	0	0	4	0
Burton Albion (loan)	Total		31	1	0	0	0	0	0	0	31	1
Bristol Rovers (loan)	2011–12	League Two	14	0	0	0	0	0	0	0	14	0
Bristol Rovers	2012–13	League Two	40	1	0	0	0	0	1 (Note: Appearance(s) in Football League Trophy)	0	41	1
Bristol Rovers	2013–14	League Two	44	1	5	0	1	0	1	0	51	1
Bristol Rovers	2014–15	Conference Premier	46	4	1	0	—		4 (Note: One appearance in FA Trophy, three appearances in Conference Premier play-offs)	0	51	4
Bristol Rovers	2015–16	League Two	31	0	0	0	1	0	2	0	34	0
Bristol Rovers	Total		175	6	6	0	2	0	8	0	191	6
Leyton Orient	2016–17	League Two	41	1	1	0	0	0	2 (Note: Appearances in EFL Trophy)	0	44	1
Carlisle United	2017–18	League Two	37	1	5	0	2	0	3	0	47	1
Carlisle United	2018–19	League Two	39	1	0	0	1	0	2	0	42	1
Carlisle United	Total		76	2	5	0	3	0	5	0	89	2
Exeter City	2019–20	League Two	31	2	2	0	0	0	8 (Note: Five appearances in EFL Trophy and three in League Two play-offs)	0	41	2
Exeter City	2020–21	League Two	31	1	1	0	0	0	1	0	33	1
Exeter City	Total		62	3	3	0	0	0	9	0	74	3
Livingston	2021–22	Scottish Premiership	8	1	0	0	3	1	—		11	2
Livingston	2022–23	Scottish Premiership	4	0	0	0	0	0	—		4	0
Livingston	2023–24	Scottish Premiership	9	0	0	0	3	1	—		12	1
Livingston	Total		21	1	0	0	6	2	—		27	3
Hartlepool United	2023–24	National League	19	1	0	0	0	0	1 (Note: Appearance in FA Trophy)	0	20	1
Hartlepool United	2024–25	National League	41	2	2	0	0	0	1	0	44	2
Hartlepool United	2025–26	National League	30	0	1	0	0	0	1	0	32	0
Hartlepool United	Total		90	3	3	0	0	0	3	0	96	3
Tamworth	2026–27	National League	1	0	0	0	0	0	2 (Note: Two appearances in National League Cup)	0	3	0
Career total			498	17	19	0	11	2	29	0	557	19

== Honours ==
Bristol Rovers

- Football League Two third-place promotion: 2015–16
- Conference Premier play-offs: 2015

Individual

- Football League Two Player of the Month: February 2013
- Conference Premier Team of the Year: 2014–15
- Bristol Rovers Player of the Year: 2014–15
