= Keary =

Keary is both a surname and given name. Notable people with the name include:

- Albert Keary (1886–1962), English footballer
- Andrew Keary (born 1987), Irish hurler
- Annie Keary (1825−1879), English novelist
- Charles Francis Keary (1848−1917), British scholar and historian
- Henry Keary (1857−1937), British Indian Army officer
- Luke Keary (born 1992), Australian rugby league player
- Pat Keary (1901−1974), Australian rules footballer
- Pat Keary (born 1993), English footballer
- Keary Colbert (born 1982), American football player
