= 2013–14 Bristol Rovers F.C. season =

Bristol Rovers
2013–14 season
- Chairman: Nick Higgs
- Manager: John Ward (until 28 March 2014); Darrell Clarke (from 28 March 2014)
- Stadium: Memorial Stadium
- Football League Two: 23rd (relegated)
- FA Cup: Third round proper
- Football League Cup: First round
- Football League Trophy: First round South West section
- Top goalscorer: League: John-Joe O'Toole (13); All: John-Joe O'Toole (15)
- Highest home attendance: 10,594 (vs. Mansfield Town, 3 May 2014)
- Lowest home attendance: 5,303 (vs. Fleetwood Town, 5 October 2013)
- Average home league attendance: 6,420
Home colours	Away colours

The 2013–14 season was the 131st season in Bristol Rovers' history and their 87th in the Football League. For the third season in a row, Rovers competed in the basement division of the Football League, League Two, having finished 14th in the 2012–13 season.

During the season, Rovers played their first competitive fixture against Newport County since their reformation and their first against Portsmouth in 20 years. They also competed in the first competitive Bristol derby since 2007, losing to Bristol City in the first round of the Football League Trophy at Ashton Gate Stadium.

The season ultimately finished in disappointment as Rovers were relegated out of the Football League for the first time since their admission in 1920. Despite Rovers only ever occupying one of the two relegation places following the final game of the season, the threat of relegation surrounded the club for the entire season.

== Season events ==
=== Pre-season ===
==== April ====
- 16 April 2013 – Defender Michael Smith signed a new two-year deal with Rovers.
- 17 April 2013 – Striker Matt Harrold agreed a new one-year deal at Rovers with the option of a further year extension.
- 19 April 2013 – John Ward agreed to a new one year rolling contract. Eurocams were announced as new home shirt sponsors and Highspec Travel Services as new away shirt sponsors. Second-year scholars Josh Southway and Pat Keary signed one-year contracts while first-year scholar Jamie Lucas signed a two-year contract.
- 23 April 2013 – Alefe Santos signed his first professional deal with Rovers.
- 25 April 2013 – Jim Paterson signed a one-year contract extension having triggered a clause in his previous contract.
- 29 April 2013 – It was confirmed that winger Joe Anyinsah would be released upon completion of his contract.
- 30 April 2013 – Defender Mark McChrystal agreed a two-year contract with Rovers.

==== May ====
- 9 May 2013 – Rovers retained list confirmed that Scott Bevan, Adam Virgo, Ross Staley and Oumare Tounkara would leave the club on completion of their contracts. A number of players were offered contract extensions.
- 13 May 2013 – Tom Lockyer agreed a two-year contract with Rovers, his first professional contract.
- 20 May 2013 – Midfielder Ollie Clarke signed a one-year contract extension.
- 30 May 2013 – Goalkeeper Steve Mildenhall agreed a two-year deal with Rovers with an option of a third year. Mildenhall had spent time on loan with Rovers during the previous season.

==== June ====
- 5 June 2013 – Midfielders Fabian Broghammer and Jordan Goddard agreed new one-year contracts.
- 12 June 2013 – Winger Ellis Harrison agreed a three-year contract with Rovers.
- 14 June 2013 – Salisbury City manager Darrell Clarke was appointed as Rovers' new Assistant Manager, taking on the role vacated since Shaun North left the club in April. Seanan Clucas agreed a one-year contract extension.
- 24 June 2013 – Oliver Norburn signed a one-year contract extension.

==== July ====
- 24 July 2013 – John-Joe O'Toole re-joined Rovers on a permanent three-year contract for an undisclosed fee from Colchester United. O'Toole played a major part in Rovers' upturn in form the previous season.

=== August ===
- 6 August 2013 – For the second season in succession, Rovers are knocked out of the League Cup first round by Championship opposition, losing 3–1 at home to Watford.
- 10 August 2013 – Danny Woodards signed a new one-year deal with Rovers.

=== September ===
- 4 September 2013 – The first Bristol derby in over six years ends in defeat for Rovers, losing 2–1 to local rivals Bristol City in the Football League Trophy first round. The match, which was broadcast live on Sky Sports, was overshadowed by a post match pitch invasion by a number of supporters, leading to more than 60 arrests being made and three police officers injured.
- 11 September 2013 – Rovers captain Tom Parkes agreed a one-year contract extension to keep him at the club until 2016.
- 12 September 2013 – Midfielder Andy Bond joined on a one-month loan deal from Colchester United.

=== October ===
- 17 October 2013 – Rovers sign defender Will Packwood and winger Alex Henshall on one-month loans from Birmingham City and Manchester City respectively.
- 18 October 2013 – Midfielder and former captain Matthew Gill joined former club Exeter City on loan until the end of 2013.
- 23 October 2013 – Former youth team Goalkeeper Matt Macey joined Arsenal. Though Macey was out of contract at Rovers, the club will receive a compensation fee believed to be around £100,000.
- 31 October 2013 – Striker Chris Beardsley joined on a one-month loan deal from Preston North End.

=== November ===
- 1 November 2013 – Jordan Goddard joined Gloucester City on loan for one month.
- 13 November 2013 – Will Packwood's loan from Birmingham City was extended by two further months.
- 22 November 2013 – Striker Chris Beardsley agreed a loan extension with Rovers, keeping him at the club until 5 January.

=== December ===
- 11 December 2013 – Defender Will Packwood was recalled by parent club Birmingham City.
- 17 December 2013 – Garry Kenneth's contract with Rovers was terminated by mutual consent.
- 18 December 2013 – Rovers' FA Cup second round replay with Crawley Town is abandoned after 75 minutes.
- 24 December 2013 – It was announced that midfielder and former club captain Matthew Gill's contract would be terminated to allow him to join Exeter City permanently.

=== January ===
- 6 January 2014 – Forward Chris Beardsley's loan from Preston North End was extended to the end of the season.
- 9 January 2014 – Defender Jim Paterson joined Celtic Nation on loan until the end of the season.
- 14 January 2014 – Rovers are eliminated from the FA Cup by Championship side Birmingham City in the third round.
- 23 January 2014 – Shaquille Hunter's agent confirmed that the winger's contract with Rovers was terminated just before Christmas following a series of disciplinary issues. Port Vale winger Kaid Mohamed joined Rovers on loan until the end of the season.

=== February ===
- 6 February 2014 – Steven Gillespie signed for Rovers until the end of the season, having been released from his Fleetwood Town contract in January.
- 7 February 2014 – Exeter City midfielder Alan Gow joined Rovers on loan for the remainder of the season with Rovers forward Eliot Richards moving in the opposite direction.

=== March ===
- 17 March 2014 – Tom Lockyer signed a contract extension, keeping him at Rovers until the summer of 2016.
- 18 March 2014 – Ollie Clarke agreed a contract extension at Rovers, committing to the club until 2016.
- 28 March 2014 – John Ward was replaced as manager by assistant Darrell Clarke. Ward became the club's new Director of Football.

=== April ===
- 4 April 2014 – Midfielder Oliver Norburn left Rovers by mutual consent.
- 27 April 2014 – Michael Smith and John-Joe O'Toole were selected in the 2013–14 PFA Team of the Year for League Two.

=== May ===
- 3 May 2014 – Rovers' final game of the season ended in a 1–0 defeat to Mansfield Town. Coupled with wins for Northampton Town and Wycombe Wanderers, the result meant that Rovers were relegated to the Conference Premier.
- 6 May 2014 – Rovers' retained list confirmed that 12 players, Fabian Broghammer, David Clarkson, Seanan Clucas, Steven Gillespie, Jordan Goddard, Conor Gough, Mitch Harding, Pat Keary, Jim Paterson, Eliot Richards, Josh Southway and Danny Woodards, were to be released on completion of their contracts. Ellis Harrison was placed on the transfer list. Lee Brown and Alefe Santos were offered new contracts and Michael Smith was offered a contract extension.
- 8 May 2014 – John Ward was sacked as the club's Director of Football, just 41 days after taking up the role.

== First team ==
As of 3 May 2014.

No.	Name	Position	Nationality	Place of birth	Date of birth	Club caps	Club goals	Int. caps	Int. goals	Previous club	Notes
Goalkeepers
1	Steve Mildenhall	GK	(England)	Swindon	13 May 1979	68	0	0	0	Millwall	
20	Conor Gough	GK	(England)	Ilford	9 August 1993	2	0	0	0	Charlton Athletic	
Defenders
2	Michael Smith	RB	(Northern Ireland)	Ballyclare	4 September 1988	101	1	0	0	Ballymena United	
3	Jim Paterson	LB	(Scotland)	Bellshill	25 September 1979	43	1	0	0	Shamrock Rovers	On loan at Celtic Nation
4	Danny Woodards	RB	(England)	Forest Gate	8 October 1983	70	4	0	0	Milton Keynes Dons	
6	Tom Parkes	CB	(England)	Sutton-in-Ashfield	15 January 1992	98	2	0	0	Leicester City	Club captain
14	Lee Brown	LB	(England)	Farnborough	10 August 1990	122	12	0	0	Queens Park Rangers	
29	Mark McChrystal	CB	(Northern Ireland)	Derry	26 June 1984	56	0	0	0	Tranmere Rovers	Vice Captain
30	Tom Lockyer	CB	(Wales)	Cardiff	3 December 1994	45	1	0	0	Youth team graduate	
34	Pat Keary	CB	(England)	Patchway	22 November 1992	1	0	0	0	Youth team graduate	
35	Josh Southway	RB	(England)			0	0	0	0	Youth team graduate	
Midfielders
11	Fabian Broghammer	LM	(Germany)	Heppenheim	14 January 1990	40	3	0	0	FC Bayern Alzenau	
16	Alan Gow	AM	(Scotland)	Clydebank	9 October 1982	4	0	0	0	On loan from Exeter City	
17	Ellis Harrison	LM/FW	(Wales)	Newport	29 January 1994	39	4	0	0	Youth team graduate	
21	Jake Green	CM	(England)	Keynsham	12 March 1994	0	0	0	0	Mansfield Town	On loan at Weymouth
23	Jordan Goddard	CM	(England)	Wolverhampton	22 March 1993	0	0	0	0	Youth team graduate	On loan at Gloucester City
24	Ollie Clarke	CM	(England)	Bristol	29 June 1992	38	2	0	0	Youth team graduate	
25	Seanan Clucas	CM	(Northern Ireland)	Dungannon	8 November 1992	36	0	0	0	Preston North End	
32	John-Joe O'Toole	CM	(Republic of Ireland)	(England) Harrow	30 September 1988	59	16	0	0	Colchester United	
33	Alefe Santos	RM	(Brazil)	São Paulo	1 March 1995	24	1	0	0	Youth team graduate	
39	Kaid Mohamed	MF	(Wales)	Cardiff	23 July 1984	21	4	0	0	On loan from Port Vale	
Forwards
7	David Clarkson	CF/CM	(Scotland)	Bellshill	10 September 1985	60	12	2	1	Bristol City	
8	Steven Gillespie	CF	(England)	Liverpool	4 June 1985	13	1	0	0	Fleetwood Town	
9	Matt Harrold	CF	(England)	Leyton	25 July 1984	76	24	0	0	Shrewsbury Town	
10	Eliot Richards	CF	(Wales)	New Tredegar	10 September 1991	115	25	0	0	Youth team graduate	On loan at Exeter City
18	Mitch Harding	CF	(England)	Weston-super-Mare	27 January 1994	17	0	0	0	Youth team graduate	
19	Chris Beardsley	CF	(England)	Derby	28 February 1984	24	1	0	0	On loan from Preston North End	
26	Ryan Brunt	CF	(England)	Birmingham	26 May 1993	29	5	0	0	Stoke City	
36	Jamie Lucas	CF	(Wales)	Pontypridd	7 December 1995	1	0	0	0	Youth team graduate	

=== Transfers ===
==== In ====
Date	Player	Position	Transferred from	Fee	Ref.
1 July 2013	Steve Mildenhall	GK	Millwall	Free	
1 July 2013	Pat Keary	DF	Youth team graduate		
1 July 2013	Jamie Lucas	FW	Youth team graduate		
1 July 2013	Josh Southway	DF	Youth team graduate		
24 July 2013	John-Joe O'Toole	MF	Colchester United	Undisclosed	
6 February 2014	Steven Gillespie	FW	Fleetwood Town	Free	

==== Loans in ====
Date from	Player	Position	Transferred from	Date until	Ref.
12 September 2013	Andy Bond	MF	Colchester United	12 October 2013	
17 October 2013	Alex Henshall	MF	Manchester City	17 November 2013	
17 October 2013	Will Packwood	DF	Birmingham City	11 December 2013	
31 October 2013	Chris Beardsley	FW	Preston North End	End of season	
23 January 2014	Kaid Mohamed	MF	Port Vale	End of season	
8 February 2014	Alan Gow	MF	Exeter City	End of season	

==== Out ====
Date	Player	Position	Transferred to	Fee	Ref.
30 June 2013	Joe Anyinsah	FW	Wrexham	Free	
30 June 2013	Scott Bevan	GK	Havant & Waterlooville	Free	
30 June 2013	Ross Staley	MF	Yate Town	Free	
30 June 2013	Oumare Tounkara	FW	Stevenage	Free	
30 June 2013	Adam Virgo	DF	Retired		
17 December 2013	Garry Kenneth	DF	Brechin City	Free	
Late December 2013	Shaquille Hunter	MF	Mangotsfield United	Free	
2 January 2014	Matthew Gill	MF	Exeter City	Free	
4 April 2014	Oliver Norburn	MF	Plymouth Argyle	Free	

==== Loans out ====
Date from	Player	Position	Transferred to	Date until	Ref.
18 October 2013	Matthew Gill	MF	Exeter City	1 January 2014	
1 November 2013	Jordan Goddard	MF	Gloucester City	1 December 2013	
21 December 2013	Jake Green	MF	Weymouth		
9 January 2014	Jim Paterson	DF	Celtic Nation	End of season	
16 January 2014	Jordan Goddard	MF	Gloucester City		
7 February 2014	Eliot Richards	FW	Exeter City	End of season	

== Squad statistics ==
=== Appearances, goals and cards ===
No.	Pos.	Name	League		FA Cup		League Cup		League Trophy		Total		Discipline	
No.	Pos.	Name	Apps	Goals	Apps	Goals	Apps	Goals	Apps	Goals	Apps	Goals	Yellow card	Red card
1	GK	(England) Steve Mildenhall	46	0	5	0	1	0	1	0	53	0	2	0
2	DF	(Northern Ireland) Michael Smith	43	0	5	0	1	0	1	0	50	0	1	0
4	DF	(England) Danny Woodards	6(3)	1	0(1)	0	0	0	0	0	6(4)	1	2	0
6	DF	(England) Tom Parkes	44	1	5	0	1	0	1	0	51	1	8	0
7	FW	(Scotland) David Clarkson	28(6)	6	3(1)	0	1	0	1	0	33(7)	6	1	1
8	FW	(England) Steven Gillespie	3(10)	1	0	0	0	0	0	0	3(10)	1	0	0
9	FW	(England) Matt Harrold	22(8)	6	3(2)	1	0	0	1	0	26(10)	7	3	0
11	MF	(Germany) Fabian Broghammer	1(3)	0	0	0	0	0	0	0	1(3)	0	0	0
14	DF	(England) Lee Brown	41	2	5	0	1	0	1	0	48	1	3	0
16	MF	(Scotland) Alan Gow	4	0	0	0	0	0	0	0	4	0	0	0
17	MF	(Wales) Ellis Harrison	9(16)	1	1(1)	0	1	0	1	0	12(17)	1	6	0
18	FW	(England) Mitch Harding	5(6)	0	1	0	0(1)	0	0	0	6(7)	0	1	0
19	FW	(England) Chris Beardsley	17(7)	1	2(2)	2	0	0	0	0	19(9)	3	2	1
24	MF	(England) Ollie Clarke	28(3)	2	5	0	0	0	0	0	33(3)	2	2	0
25	MF	(Northern Ireland) Seanan Clucas	11(6)	0	1	0	0	0	0	0	12(6)	0	2	0
26	FW	(England) Ryan Brunt	8(2)	0	0(1)	0	0	0	0(1)	0	8(4)	0	2	0
29	DF	(Northern Ireland) Mark McChrystal	35	0	2	0	1	0	1	1	39	1	4	0
30	DF	(Wales) Tom Lockyer	38(3)	1	4	0	1	0	1	0	43(3)	1	7	0
32	MF	(Republic of Ireland) John-Joe O'Toole	41	13	3	2	1	0	1	0	46	15	12	1
33	MF	(Brazil) Alefe Santos	7(15)	1	1(1)	0	0(1)	0	0(1)	0	8(18)	1	1	0
34	DF	(England) Pat Keary	0(1)	0	0	0	0	0	0	0	0(1)	0	0	0
36	FW	(Wales) Jamie Lucas	0(1)	0	0	0	0	0	0	0	0(1)	0	0	0
39	MF	(Wales) Kaid Mohamed	19(1)	4	0	0	0	0	0	0	19(1)	4	2	0
Players to have appeared for Bristol Rovers who are currently on loan:
10	FW	(Wales) Eliot Richards	19(3)	2	5	2	1	1	0	0	25(3)	5	0	0
Players to have appeared for Bristol Rovers who have left:
—	MF	(England) Andy Bond	5	0	0	0	0	0	0	0	5	0	0	0
—	MF	(England) Matthew Gill	0(1)	0	0	0	0	0	0	0	0(1)	0	0	0
—	MF	(England) Alex Henshall	1(1)	1	0	0	0	0	0	0	1(1)	1	1	0
—	DF	(United States) Will Packwood	8	0	0	0	0	0	0	0	8	0	1	0
—	MF	(England) Shaquille Hunter	0(3)	0	0	0	0(1)	0	0	0	0(4)	0	0	0
—	MF	(England) Oliver Norburn	15(1)	0	4	1	1	0	1	0	21(1)	1	1	0

=== Goal scorers ===
Rank	Name	League Two	FA Cup	League Cup	FL Trophy	Total
1	John-Joe O'Toole	13	2	0	0	15
2	Matt Harrold	6	1	0	0	7
3	David Clarkson	6	0	0	0	6
4	Eliot Richards	2	2	1	0	5
5	Kaid Mohamed	4	0	0	0	4
6	Chris Beardsley	1	2	0	0	3
7	Lee Brown	2	0	0	0	2
7	Ollie Clarke	2	0	0	0	2
9	Tom Lockyer	1	0	0	0	1
9	Alefe Santos	1	0	0	0	1
9	Alex Henshall	1	0	0	0	1
9	Tom Parkes	1	0	0	0	1
9	Steven Gillespie	1	0	0	0	1
9	Ellis Harrison	1	0	0	0	1
9	Danny Woodards	1	0	0	0	1
9	Oliver Norburn	0	1	0	0	1
9	Mark McChrystal	0	0	0	1	1

==== Penalties ====
Date	Penalty Taker	Scored	Opponent	Competition
14 September	Matt Harrold	No	Dagenham & Redbridge	League Two
2 November	John-Joe O'Toole	Yes	Oxford United	League Two
16 November	John-Joe O'Toole	Yes	Bury	League Two
30 November	Matt Harrold	Yes	AFC Wimbledon	League Two
11 January	John-Joe O'Toole	Yes	Exeter City	League Two

=== Disciplinary record ===
Name	League Two		FA Cup		League Cup		FL Trophy		Total	
Name	Yellow card	Red card	Yellow card	Red card	Yellow card	Red card	Yellow card	Red card	Yellow card	Red card
John-Joe O'Toole	12	1	0	0	0	0	0	0	12	1
Chris Beardsley	2	1	0	0	0	0	0	0	2	1
David Clarkson	0	1	0	0	0	0	1	0	1	1
Tom Parkes	8	0	0	0	0	0	0	0	8	0
Tom Lockyer	7	0	1*	0	0	0	0	0	8	0
Ellis Harrison	5	0	1	0	0	0	0	0	6	0
Mark McChrystal	4	0	0	0	0	0	0	0	4	0
Matt Harrold	3	0	0	0	0	0	0	0	3	0
Lee Brown	3	0	0	0	0	0	0	0	3	0
Ryan Brunt	2	0	0	0	0	0	0	0	2	0
Steve Mildenhall	2	0	0	0	0	0	0	0	2	0
Kaid Mohamed	2	0	0	0	0	0	0	0	2	0
Ollie Clarke	2	0	0	0	0	0	0	0	2	0
Danny Woodards	2	0	0	0	0	0	0	0	2	0
Seanan Clucas	2	0	0	0	0	0	0	0	2	0
Oliver Norburn	0	0	2*	0	0	0	0	0	2	0
Alefe Santos	1	0	0	0	0	0	0	0	1	0
Mitch Harding	1	0	0	0	0	0	0	0	1	0
Alex Henshall	1	0	0	0	0	0	0	0	1	0
Will Packwood	1	0	0	0	0	0	0	0	1	0
Michael Smith	1	0	0	0	0	0	0	0	1	0

- Note: Both Tom Lockyer and Oliver Norburn were booked in the abandoned FA Cup match vs Crawley Town. Despite the match not being completed, their yellow cards still stand.

==== Suspensions served ====
Player	Reason	Opponents Missed
David Clarkson	(red card) vs. Wycombe Wanderers (H)	Accrington Stanley (A); Chesterfield (H); Oxford United (A)
John-Joe O'Toole	5 x (yellow card) (before 31 December)	York City (FA Cup, H)
Chris Beardsley	(red card) vs. Burton Albion (A)	Cheltenham Town (A); AFC Wimbledon (H); Crawley Town (FA Cup, H)
John-Joe O'Toole	(red card) vs. Burton Albion (A)	Cheltenham Town (A); AFC Wimbledon (H); Crawley Town (FA Cup, H)
Tom Lockyer	5 x (yellow card) (before 31 December)*	Portsmouth (H)
John-Joe O'Toole	10 x (yellow card)	Fleetwood Town (A); Morecambe (H)

- Note: Tom Lockyer's fifth yellow card came in the abandoned FA Cup match with Crawley Town. Despite the match not being completed, his yellow card and therefore suspension, still stand.

== Competitions ==
=== Overall ===
Competition	Started round	Current position / round	Final position / round	First match	Last match
League Two	—	—	23rd	3 August 2013	3 May 2014
League Cup	1st round	—	1st round	6 August 2013	
Football League Trophy	1st round	—	1st round	4 September 2013	
FA Cup	1st round	—	3rd round	9 November 2013	14 January 2014

Updated to match played 3 May 2014
Source: Competitions

=== League Two ===
Locations of Bristol Rovers 2013–14 League Two opponents

==== League table ====
Pos	Team	Pld	W	D	L	GF	GA	GD	Pts	Promotion, qualification or relegation
20	AFC Wimbledon	46	14	14	18	49	57	−8	53 (Note: On 28 April AFC Wimbledon were deducted 3 points for fielding an ineligible player.)	
21	Northampton Town	46	13	14	19	42	57	−15	53	
22	Wycombe Wanderers	46	12	14	20	46	54	−8	50	
23	Bristol Rovers (R)	46	12	14	20	43	54	−11	50	Relegation to the Conference Premier
24	Torquay United (R)	46	12	9	25	42	66	−24	45	Relegation to the Conference Premier

Updated to match(es) played on 3 May 2014. Source: BBC Sport
Rules for classification: 1) Points; 2) Goal difference; 3) Number of goals scored
(R) Relegated

==== Results summary ====
Overall								Home						Away					
Pld	W	D	L	GF	GA	GD	Pts	W	D	L	GF	GA	GD	W	D	L	GF	GA	GD
46	12	14	20	43	54	−11	50	10	6	7	28	21	+7	2	8	13	15	33	−18

Last updated: 3 May 2014.

==== Results by round ====
Round	1	2	3	4	5	6	7	8	9	10	11	12	13	14	15	16	17	18	19	20	21	22	23	24	25	26	27	28	29	30	31	32	33	34	35	36	37	38	39	40	41	42	43	44	45	46
Ground	A	H	A	H	H	A	A	H	A	H	A	H	A	H	A	H	A	A	H	A	H	A	A	H	A	H	H	A	H	H	H	A	A	H	H	A	H	A	H	A	A	H	A	H	A	H
Result	L	D	L	W	W	L	L	D	D	L	D	L	L	D	W	D	L	D	W	L	W	D	L	W	D	W	L	L	D	W	W	D	D	W	L	L	D	L	W	L	D	L	L	L	W	L
Position	15	16	20	17	11	16	18	19	17	20	20	20	21	21	20	20	22	22	22	22	18	19	21	21	22	18	20	21	21	18	16	19	17	14	16	18	17	20	20	20	21	21	22	22	21	23

Updated to match(es) played on 3 May 2014. Source:
A = Away; H = Home; W = Win; D = Draw; L = Loss

==== Scores Overview ====
Bristol Rovers score given first.

Opposition	Home Score	Away Score
Accrington Stanley	0–1	1–2
AFC Wimbledon	3–0	0–0
Burton Albion	2–0	0–1
Bury	1–1	1–2
Cheltenham Town	1–0	0–0
Chesterfield	0–0	1–3
Dagenham & Redbridge	1–2	0–2
Exeter City	2–1	1–2
Fleetwood Town	1–3	1–3
Hartlepool United	2–2	0–4
Mansfield Town	0–1	1–1
Morecambe	1–0	1–2
Newport County	3–1	0–1
Northampton Town	1–0	0–0
Oxford United	1–1	1–0
Plymouth Argyle	2–1	0–1
Portsmouth	2–0	2–3
Rochdale	1–2	0–2
Scunthorpe United	0–0	1–1
Southend United	0–0	1–1
Torquay United	1–2	1–1
Wycombe Wanderers	0–1	2–1
York City	3–2	0–0

== Matches ==
Won Drawn Lost Postponed

=== Pre-season friendlies ===
12 July 2013	Bath City	2–2	Bristol Rovers	Mayday Trust Park
19:30	Stearn 15' (pen.); Watkins 51'	Report	Brunt 27'; Harrold 48'	Attendance: 1,131

16 July 2013	Hereford United	0–1	Bristol Rovers	Edgar Street
19:30		Report	Clarkson 74'

19 July 2013	Bristol Rovers	0–2	Derby County	Memorial Stadium
19:45		Report	Ward 23'; Russell 52'	Attendance: 1,945

23 July 2013	Clevedon Town	1–5	Bristol Rovers	The Hand Stadium
19:30	Robbins 21'	Report	Harding 33' (pen.), 54'; Rigg 66', 90'; Goddard 83'

26 July 2013	Salisbury City	P – P	Bristol Rovers	Raymond McEnhill Stadium
19:30

28 July 2013	Bristol Rovers	2–1	Reading XI	Memorial Stadium
15:00	Richards 23'; Clarkson 45+1'	Report	McCleary 67'	Attendance: 1,738

=== League Two ===
==== August ====
3 August 2013	Exeter City	2–1	Bristol Rovers	St James Park
15:00	Coles 59'; Parkin 79'	Report	Richards 68'	Attendance: 5,196; Referee: Mark Heywood

10 August 2013	Bristol Rovers	0–0	Scunthorpe United	Memorial Stadium
15:00		Report		Attendance: 6,259; Referee: Brendan Malone

17 August 2013	Newport County	1–0	Bristol Rovers	Rodney Parade
15:00	Sandell 42' (pen.)	Report		Attendance: 5,387; Referee: Lee Collins

24 August 2013	Bristol Rovers	3–2	York City	Memorial Stadium
15:00	Clarkson 3', 33'; O'Toole 67'	Report	Jarvis 41', 64' (pen.); Bowman (red card) 43'	Attendance: 5,569; Referee: Gary Sutton

31 August 2013	Bristol Rovers	1–0	Northampton Town	Memorial Stadium
15:00	Lockyer 2'	Report	O'Donovan (yellow card) 81' (yellow-red card) 90+5'	Attendance: 5,695; Referee: Mark Haywood

==== September ====
7 September 2013	Plymouth Argyle	1–0	Bristol Rovers	Home Park
15:00	Reid 82'	Report		Attendance: 8,631; Referee: Andy Davies

14 September 2013	Dagenham & Redbridge	2–0	Bristol Rovers	London Borough of Barking & Dagenham Stadium
15:00	Ogogo 10'; Howell 72'	Report		Attendance: 1,423; Referee: Graham Horwood

21 September 2013	Bristol Rovers	2–2	Hartlepool United	Memorial Stadium
15:00	Harrold 35'; O'Toole 90'	Report	James 36', 45+1'	Attendance: 5,579; Referee: Charles Breakspear

27 September 2013	Southend United	1–1	Bristol Rovers	Roots Hall
19:45	Hurst 67'	Report	Harrold 51'	Attendance: 5,489; Referee: Tim Robinson

==== October ====
5 October 2013	Bristol Rovers	1–3	Fleetwood Town	Memorial Stadium
15:00	O'Toole 66'	Report	Matt 64', 87'; Parkin 90+4'	Attendance: 5,303; Referee: Michael Bull

12 October 2013	Mansfield Town	1–1	Bristol Rovers	One Call Stadium
15:00	Stevenson 22'	Report	Santos 84'	Attendance: 3,275; Referee: Scott Duncan

19 October 2013	Bristol Rovers	0–1	Wycombe Wanderers	Memorial Stadium
15:00	Clarkson (red card) 26'	Report	Kretzschmar 82'	Attendance: 5,783; Referee: Darren Sheldrake

22 October 2013	Accrington Stanley	2–1	Bristol Rovers	The Store First Stadium
19:45	Gray 19'; Naismith 29'	Report	Henshall 5'	Attendance: 1,101; Referee: Geoff Eltringham

26 October 2013	Bristol Rovers	0–0	Chesterfield	Memorial Stadium
15:00		Report	Doyle (yellow card) 67' (yellow-red card) 87'	Attendance: 5,667; Referee: Iain Williamson

==== November ====
2 November 2013	Oxford United	0–1	Bristol Rovers	Kassam Stadium
15:00		Report	O'Toole 71' (pen.)	Attendance: 6,374; Referee: Mark Brown

16 November 2013	Bristol Rovers	1–1	Bury	Memorial Stadium
15:00	O'Toole 4' (pen.)	Report	Hylton 36'	Attendance: 5,534; Referee: Andy Davies

23 November 2013	Burton Albion	1–0	Bristol Rovers	Pirelli Stadium
15:00	Weir 59'; Phillips (yellow card) 31' (yellow-red card) 90+1'	Report	Beardsley (red card) 37'; O'Toole (red card) 90+4'	Attendance: 2,302; Referee: Paul Tierney

26 November 2013	Cheltenham Town	0–0	Bristol Rovers	Abbey Business Stadium
19:45		Report		Attendance: 3,556; Referee: David Coote

30 November 2013	Bristol Rovers	3–0	AFC Wimbledon	Memorial Stadium
15:00	Clarkson 19'; Parkes 31'; Harrold 89' (pen.)	Report	Moore (yellow card) 41' (yellow-red card) 82'	Attendance: 5,860; Referee: Gavin Ward

==== December ====
14 December 2013	Morecambe	2–1	Bristol Rovers	Globe Arena
15:00	Amond 57'; Redshaw 87'	Report	O'Toole 30'	Attendance: 1,514; Referee: Seb Stockbridge

21 December 2013	Bristol Rovers	2–0	Portsmouth	Memorial Stadium
15:00	Clarke 40'; Clarkson 77'	Report		Attendance: 7,537; Referee: Steven Rushton

26 December 2013	Torquay United	1–1	Bristol Rovers	Plainmoor
13:00	Marquis 6' (pen.)	Report	Harrold 27'	Attendance: 3,461; Referee: Phil Gibbs

29 December 2013	Rochdale	2–0	Bristol Rovers	Spotland Stadium
15:00	Hogan 58'; Cummins 62'	Report		Attendance: 2,576; Referee: Darren Drysdale

==== January ====
1 January 2014	Bristol Rovers	P–P	Cheltenham Town	Memorial Stadium
13:00		Report; Postponed due to a waterlogged pitch.		Referee: Iain Williamson

4 January 2014	Scunthorpe United	P–P	Bristol Rovers	Glanford Park
15:00		Postponed due to a Rovers' FA Cup commitments.

11 January 2014	Bristol Rovers	2–1	Exeter City	Memorial Stadium
15:00	O'Toole 21' (pen.), 90+3'	Report	Brown 20' (o.g.)	Attendance: 6,674; Referee: Andy Madley

18 January 2014	York City	0–0	Bristol Rovers	Bootham Crescent
15:00		Report		Attendance: 3,514; Referee: David Webb

25 January 2014	Bristol Rovers	3–1	Newport County	Memorial Stadium
15:00	Mohamed 45+4'; Richards 48'; O'Toole 90'	Report	Howe 57'	Attendance: 7,288; Referee: Jeremy Simpson

28 January 2014	Bristol Rovers	0–1	Accrington Stanley	Memorial Stadium
19:45		Report	Murphy 90+3'	Attendance: 6,067; Referee: David Phillips

==== February ====
1 February 2014	Chesterfield	3–1	Bristol Rovers	Proact Stadium
15:00	Morsy 5'; Banks 44'; Doyle 47'	Report	Brown 36'	Attendance: 6,048; Referee: Geoff Eltringham

8 February 2014	Bristol Rovers	1–1	Oxford United	Memorial Stadium
15:00	O'Toole 84'	Report	Constable 10'	Attendance: 6,493; Referee: Lee Collins

11 February 2014	Bristol Rovers	1–0	Cheltenham Town	Memorial Stadium
19:45	O'Toole 34'	Report		Attendance: 5,808; Referee: Iain Williamson

15 February 2014	Bury	P–P	Bristol Rovers	The JD Stadium
15:00		Report; Postponed due to a waterlogged pitch		Referee: Michael Naylor

21 February 2014	Bristol Rovers	2–0	Burton Albion	Memorial Stadium
19:45	Clarkson 70'; O'Toole 79'	Report		Attendance: 5,957; Referee: Keith Stroud

25 February 2014	Scunthorpe United	1–1	Bristol Rovers	Glanford Park
19:45	Winnall 22'	Report	Gillespie 89'	Attendance: 3,318; Referee: Mark Haywood

==== March ====
1 March 2014	Northampton Town	0–0	Bristol Rovers	Sixfields Stadium
15:00		Report		Attendance: 5,058; Referee: Mike Russell

8 March 2014	Bristol Rovers	2–1	Plymouth Argyle	Memorial Stadium
15:00	Beardsley 7'; Mohamed 78'	Report	Trotman 44'	Attendance: 7,799; Referee: James Linington

11 March 2014	Bristol Rovers	1–2	Dagenham & Redbridge	Memorial Stadium
19:45	O'Toole 7'	Report	Azeez 23', 58'	Attendance: 5,761; Referee: Stuart Attwell

15 March 2014	Hartlepool United	4–0	Bristol Rovers	Victoria Park
15:00	Harewood 2'; Walker 16'; Walton 56' (pen.); Franks 90'	Report		Attendance: 3,480; Referee: Seb Stockbridge

21 March 2014	Bristol Rovers	0–0	Southend United	Memorial Stadium
19:45		Report		Attendance: 6,028; Referee: Graham Salisbury

25 March 2014	Fleetwood Town	3–1	Bristol Rovers	Highbury Stadium
19:45	Sarcevic 21'; Roberts 40'; Ball 51'	Report	Harrison 79'	Attendance: 2,023; Referee: Kevin Wright

29 March 2014	Bristol Rovers	1–0	Morecambe	Memorial Stadium
15:00	Mohamed 90+4'	Report		Attendance: 5,647; Referee: Simon Hooper

==== April ====
1 April 2014	Bury	2–1	Bristol Rovers	JD Stadium
19:45	Hope 3'; Soares 80'	Report	Clarke 45+4'	Attendance: 2,314; Referee: Michael Naylor

5 April 2014	AFC Wimbledon	0–0	Bristol Rovers	The Cherry Red Records Stadium
15:00		Report		Attendance: 4,322; Referee: Tim Robinson

12 April 2014	Bristol Rovers	1–2	Torquay United	Memorial Stadium
15:07	Woodards 90+6'	Report	Coulthirst 62'; Mansell 75'	Attendance: 6,612; Referee: Andy D'Urso

19 April 2014	Portsmouth	3–2	Bristol Rovers	Fratton Park
15:00	Webster 12'; Hollands 41'; Fogden 70'	Report	Harrold 22', 41'	Attendance: 17,998; Referee: James Adcock

21 April 2014	Bristol Rovers	1–2	Rochdale	Memorial Stadium
13:00	Mohamed 17'	Report	Bunney 46'; Lund 63'	Attendance: 8,158; Referee: Dean Whitestone

26 April 2014	Wycombe Wanderers	1–2	Bristol Rovers	Adams Park
15:00	McClure 20'	Report	Brown 11'; Clarkson 76'	Attendance: 6,752; Referee: David Coote

==== May ====
3 May 2014	Bristol Rovers	0–1	Mansfield Town	Memorial Stadium
15:00		Report	Daniel 36'	Attendance: 10,594; Referee: Oliver Langford

=== League Cup ===
6 August 2013 1st round	Bristol Rovers	1–3	Watford	Memorial Stadium
19:45	Richards 41'	Report	Murray 19', 35'; Angella 30'	Attendance: 4,875; Referee: Darren Sheldrake

=== Football League Trophy ===
4 September 2013 1st round	Bristol City	2–1	Bristol Rovers	Ashton Gate Stadium
19:45	Emmanuel-Thomas 12'; Bryan 76'	Report	McChrystal 59'	Attendance: 17,888; Referee: Simon Hooper

=== FA Cup ===
8 November 2013 1st round	Bristol Rovers	3–3	York City	Memorial Stadium
19:45	Richards 37'; Harrold 59'; Beardsley 75'	Report	Jarvis 35'; Carson 41'; Fletcher 86'	Attendance: 4,654; Referee: Trevor Kettle

19 November 2013 1st round replay	York City	2–3	Bristol Rovers	Bootham Crescent
19:45	Fletcher 70' (pen.), 71'	Report	O'Toole 16'; Norburn 45'; Beardsley 50'	Attendance: 2,051; Referee: Andy Haines

7 December 2013 2nd round	Bristol Rovers	0–0	Crawley Town	Memorial Stadium
15:00		Report		Attendance: 4,623; Referee: Chris Sarginson

18 December 2013 2nd round replay	Crawley Town	A–A	Bristol Rovers	The Checkatrade.com Stadium
19:45		Report; Match abandoned after 75 minutes.		Referee: Stuart Attwell

4 January 2014 2nd round replay	Crawley Town	P–P	Bristol Rovers	The Checkatrade.com Stadium
15:00		Report; Postponed due to a waterlogged pitch.		Referee: Andy Davies

8 January 2014 2nd round replay	Crawley Town	1–2	Bristol Rovers	The Checkatrade.com Stadium
19:45	Proctor 15'	Report	Richards 83'; O'Toole 90+1'	Attendance: 2,435; Referee: Andy Davies

14 January 2014 3rd round	Birmingham City	3–0	Bristol Rovers	St Andrew's
19:45	Robinson 35'; Burke 85', 87'	Report		Attendance: 9,914; Referee: Tony Harrington

== See also ==
- 2013–14 in English football
- 2013–14 Football League Two
- List of Bristol Rovers F.C. seasons
