= Pat Keary =

English footballer

Personal information
- Full name: Patrick Keary
- Date of birth: 22 November 1993 (age 32)
- Place of birth: Bristol, England
- Position: Centre back

Youth career
- –2010: Bristol Rovers
- 2010–2011: Mangotsfield United
- 2011–2013: Bristol Rovers

Senior career*
Years	Team	Apps	(Gls)
2013–2014	Bristol Rovers	1	(0)
2014–2015	Bath City	25	(1)
2015–2016	Weston-super-Mare	42	(0)
- * Club domestic league appearances and goals as of 01:30, 22 May 2016 (UTC)

Patrick Keary (born 22 November 1993) is an English footballer who plays as a centre back. He is a free agent after he was released by Bristol Rovers.

Keary played and captained the Bristol Rovers Centre of Excellence sides from the age of 8 to 16, before being released from the club. He then spent a year playing and studying for TeamBath, at Bath University.

During his time away from Bristol Rovers he also made appearances for the Mangotsfield United reserve team in the Somerset County League (5 appearances, 2 goals) and made one first-team appearance for Southern League Division One South & West side Mangotsfield United in a cup competition.

After a year out of the Bristol Rovers setup the club's then Head of Youth, Ken Oram, rang him up and offered a trial. Following the successful conclusion he then signed a 2-year youth scholarship.

Keary eventually made his football league debut on 12 October 2013 in an away match against Mansfield Town coming on as a substitute in the 23rd minute for Lee Brown.

Keary was released by Rovers at the end of the 2013–14 season and went on trial with Conference South side Bath City. He went on to score the only goal against Bristol Rovers in a pre-season friendly. Keary signed for Bath City in August 2014 and played 25 games for the side in the 2014/15 season, scoring one goal.

The following season Keary signed for Weston-super-Mare AFC in the Conference South. He started 45 games in all competitions for the Seagulls during the 2015/16 season. In May 2016, the club announced that he had departed, along with Jake Llewllyn to pursue a career in the United States.
