= List of EFL League Two hat-tricks =

EFL League Two was created in 2004 after a renaming of the lower leagues in English football. Since the start of the newly re-branded league many players have scored a hat-trick.

The list includes only hat-tricks scored in the league; hat-tricks scored in play-off matches are not counted.

== Hat-tricks ==
Key
^{5}	Player scored five goals
^{4}	Player scored four goals
*	Home team

Note: The results column shows the home team score first

Player	Nationality	For	Against	Result	Date	Ref
Phil Jevons	England	Yeovil Town*	Oxford United	6–1	18 September 2004	
Glynn Hurst	England	Notts County	Rochdale*	0–3	25 September 2004	
Alun Armstrong	England	Darlington*	Southend United	4–0	2 October 2004	
Freddy Eastwood	Wales	Southend United*	Swansea City	4–2	16 October 2004	
Lee Steele	England	Leyton Orient	Lincoln City*	3–4	23 October 2004	
Drewe Broughton	England	Rushden & Diamonds*	Notts County	5–1	30 October 2004	
Phil Jevons	England	Yeovil Town*	Chester City	4–1	30 October 2004	
Andy Kirk	Northern Ireland	Boston United	Kidderminster Harriers*	0–4	6 November 2004	
John Turner	England	Cambridge United*	Rushden & Diamonds	3–1	20 November 2004	
Lee Trundle	England	Swansea City*	Notts County	4–0	18 December 2004	
Simon Yeo	England	Lincoln City	Grimsby Town*	2–4	22 January 2005	
Jon Parkin	England	Macclesfield Town	Notts County*	0–5	25 January 2005	
Phil Jevons	England	Yeovil Town*	Bristol Rovers	4–2	12 February 2005	
Matthew Tipton	Wales	Macclesfield Town*	Rochdale	3–0	19 February 2005	
Nathan Tyson	England	Wycombe Wanderers	Lincoln City*	2–3	5 March 2005	
Nathan Tyson	England	Wycombe Wanderers*	Kidderminster Harriers	3–0	2 April 2005	
Billy Sharp	England	Rushden & Diamonds*	Boston United	4–2	16 April 2005	
Akpo Sodje	England	Darlington	Chester City*	4–4	27 August 2005	
Nathan Tyson	England	Wycombe Wanderers	Stockport County*	3–3	10 September 2005	
Kevin Betsy	England	Wycombe Wanderers	Mansfield Town*	2–3	24 September 2005	
Glynn Hurst	England	Notts County	Bury*	2–3	29 October 2005	
Karl Hawley	England	Carlisle United*	Stockport County	6–0	29 October 2005	
Karl Hawley	England	Carlisle United	Torquay United*	3–4	12 November 2005	
Michael Bridges	England	Carlisle United	Boston United*	0–5	18 January 2006	
Derek Asamoah	Ghana	Chester City	Boston United*	1–3	29 March 2006	
Barry Conlon	Ireland	Darlington*	Macclesfield Town	4–0	5 August 2006	
Jermaine Easter	Wales	Wycombe Wanderers*	Bury	3–0	19 August 2006	
Jamie Forrester^{4}	England	Lincoln City	Mansfield Town*	2–4	26 August 2006	
Andy Cooke	England	Shrewsbury Town	Stockport County*	0–3	12 September 2006	
Adam Le Fondre^{4}	England	Stockport County*	Wrexham	5–2	16 September 2006	
Jon Daly	Ireland	Hartlepool United*	Wrexham	3–0	30 September 2006	
Jamie Forrester	England	Lincoln City	Barnet*	0–5	14 October 2006	
Jamie Forrester	England	Lincoln City*	Rochdale	7–1	21 October 2006	
Tresor Kandol	Democratic Republic of the Congo	Barnet*	Rochdale	3–2	18 November 2006	
Andy Cooke	England	Shrewsbury Town*	Stockport County	4–2	1 January 2007	
Clive Platt	England	Milton Keynes Dons*	Barnet	3–1	20 January 2007	
Lee Thorpe	England	Torquay United*	Grimsby Town	4–1	26 January 2007	
Martin Gritton	Scotland	Mansfield Town*	Torquay United	5–0	30 January 2007	
Peter Bore	England	Grimsby Town	Boston United*	0–6	3 February 2007	
Steve Guinan	England	Hereford United	Lincoln City*	1–4	20 February 2007	
Danny North	England	Grimsby Town*	Barnet	5–0	21 April 2007	
Chris Dagnall	England	Rochdale*	Macclesfield Town	5–0	21 April 2007	
Anthony Elding	England	Stockport County	Brentford*	1–3	29 September 2007	
Simon Brown	England	Mansfield Town*	Macclesfield Town	5–0	3 November 2007	
Jack Lester	England	Chesterfield	Lincoln City*	2–4	6 November 2007	
Lionel Ainsworth	England	Hereford United	Stockport County*	2–3	17 November 2007	
Aaron McLean	England	Peterborough United*	Brentford	7–0	24 November 2007	
Adam Proudlock	England	Stockport County*	Wycombe Wanderers	6–0	8 December 2007	
Jason Puncheon	England	Barnet*	Dagenham & Redbridge	3–1	26 December 2007	
Scott McGleish	England	Wycombe Wanderers	Mansfield Town*	0–4	8 January 2008	
Peter Thorne	England	Bradford City*	Notts County	3–0	12 January 2008	
Derek Holmes	Scotland	Rotherham United	Lincoln City*	1–3	12 January 2008	
George Boyd	England	Peterborough United*	Accrington Stanley	8–2	15 January 2008	
Aaron McLean	England	Peterborough United*	Accrington Stanley	8–2	15 January 2008	
David Perkins	England	Rochdale	Chesterfield*	3–4	16 January 2008	
Mark Wright	England	MK Dons	Bury*	1–5	2 February 2008	
Sherjill MacDonald	Netherlands	Hereford United	Rochdale*	2–4	12 February 2008	
Tommy Rowe	England	Stockport County	Rotherham United*	1–4	12 February 2008	
Adam Le Fondre	England	Rochdale*	Accrington Stanley	4–1	16 March 2008	
Chris Dagnall	England	Rochdale*	Rotherham United	4–1	24 March 2008	
Jon Newby	England	Morecambe*	Rotherham United	5–1	29 March 2008	
Rene Howe	England	Rochdale*	Grimsby Town	3–1	5 April 2008	
Michael Boulding	England	Mansfield Town*	Shrewsbury Town	3–1	19 April 2008	
Billy Clarke^{4}	Ireland	Darlington	Macclesfield Town*	0–6	30 August 2008	
Kevin Ellison	England	Chester City	Grimsby Town*	1–3	13 September 2008	
Chris Dagnall	England	Rochdale*	Chester City	6–1	21 October 2008	
Jamie Ward	Northern Ireland	Chesterfield*	Aldershot Town	5–1	22 October 2008	
Jonathan Forte	Barbados	Notts County	Barnet*	0–4	15 November 2008	
Paul Benson	England	Dagenham & Redbridge*	Notts County	6–1	22 November 2008	
Jamie Clarke	England	Accrington Stanley*	Grimsby Town	3–1	28 December 2008	
Jamie Forrester	England	Notts County*	Port Vale	4–2	24 January 2009	
Joe Thompson	England	Rochdale	Aldershot Town*	2–4	31 January 2009	
Jordan Rhodes	England	Brentford	Shrewsbury Town*	1–3	31 January 2009	
Charlie MacDonald	England	Brentford*	Chester City	3–0	7 February 2009	
Reuben Reid	England	Rotherham United	Chester City*	1–5	10 March 2009	
Brett Pitman	England	Bournemouth*	Rochdale	4–0	4 April 2009	
Lee Hughes	England	Notts County*	Bradford City	5–0	8 August 2009	
Paul Benson^{4}	England	Dagenham & Redbridge*	Shrewsbury Town	5–0	18 August 2009	
Lee Hughes	England	Notts County*	Northampton Town	5–2	12 September 2009	
Luke Rodgers	England	Notts County	Lincoln City*	0–3	29 September 2009	
Greg Pearson	England	Burton Albion*	Aldershot Town	6–1	12 December 2009	
Lee Hughes	England	Notts County	Burton Albion*	1–4	28 December 2009	
Chris O'Grady	England	Rochdale	Cheltenham Town*	1–4	23 January 2010	
Craig Westcarr	England	Notts County*	Hereford United	5–0	27 February 2010	
Marc Richards	England	Port Vale	Chesterfield	0–5	13 March 2010	
Michael Pook	England	Cheltenham Town	Burton Albion*	5–6	13 March 2010	
Chris Dagnall	England	Rochdale*	Grimsby Town	4–1	27 March 2010	
Jake Robinson	England	Shrewsbury Town*	Bradford City	3–1	7 August 2010	
Danny Whitaker	England	Chesterfield*	Hereford United	4–0	21 August 2010	
Adam Le Fondre^{4}	England	Rotherham United*	Cheltenham Town	6–4	21 August 2010	
Sean McConville	England	Accrington Stanley*	Macclesfield Town	3–0	21 August 2010	
James Constable	England	Oxford United*	Morecambe	4–0	4 September 2010	
Shaun Harrad	England	Burton Albion	Rotherham United*	3–3	11 September 2010	
Chris Holroyd	England	Stevenage	Hereford United*	1–4	28 September 2010	
Leon McKenzie	England	Northampton Town*	Hereford United	3–4	16 October 2010	
Phil Jevons	England	Morecambe*	Stockport County	5–0	2 November 2010	
Mark Wright	England	Shrewsbury Town*	Hereford United	4–0	23 November 2010	
Jack Lester	England	Chesterfield*	Stockport County	4–1	1 January 2011	
Jack Midson	England	Oxford United	Torquay United*	3–4	3 January 2011	
Cody McDonald	England	Gillingham	Stockport County*	1–5	8 January 2011	
Ashley Grimes	England	Lincoln City	Stockport County*	3–4	22 January 2011	
Lionel Ainsworth	England	Shrewsbury Town	Lincoln City*	1–5	8 February 2011	
Clayton Donaldson	England	Crewe Alexandra*	Burton Albion	4–1	5 March 2011	
Jack Lester	England	Chesterfield*	Rotherham United	5–0	18 March 2011	
Ian Thomas-Moore	England	Rotherham United	Lincoln City*	0–6	25 March 2011	
Steve Kabba^{4}	England	Barnet	Burton Albion*	1–4	2 April 2011	
Clayton Donaldson	England	Crewe Alexandra*	Cheltenham Town	8–1	2 April 2011	
Joel Grant	Jamaica	Crewe Alexandra*	Cheltenham Town	8–1	2 April 2011	
Izale McLeod	England	Barnet	Gillingham*	2–4	23 April 2011	
Jimmy Ryan	Ireland	Accrington Stanley*	Barnet	3–1	30 April 2011	
Louis Dodds	England	Port Vale*	Morecambe	7–2	30 April 2011	
Justin Richards	England	Port Vale*	Morecambe	7–2	30 April 2011	
Danny Carlton	England	Morecambe*	Crawley Town	6–0	10 September 2011	
Billy Kee	Northern Ireland	Burton Albion	Barnet*	3–6	29 October 2011	
Jo Kuffour	England	Gillingham*	Northampton Town	4–3	5 November 2011	
Guy Madjo	Cameroon	Port Vale*	Aldershot Town	4–0	17 December 2011	
Michael Smith	England	Accrington Stanley*	Gillingham	4–3	28 January 2012	
Nahki Wells	Bermuda	Bradford City	Northampton Town*	1–3	14 April 2012	
Eliot Richards	Wales	Bristol Rovers*	Burton Albion	7–1	14 April 2012	
Bilel Mohsni	France	Southend United*	Barnet	3–0	20 April 2012	
Brian Woodall	England	Dagenham & Redbridge*	Bristol Rovers	4–0	5 May 2012	
Jon Parkin	England	Fleetwood Town	Morecambe*	0–4	8 September 2012	
Tom Pope^{4}	England	Port Vale*	Rotherham United	6–2	8 September 2012	
Craig Reid	England	Aldershot Town	Torquay United*	3–4	2 October 2012	
Tom Craddock^{4}	England	Oxford United*	Accrington Stanley	5–0	20 October 2012	
Adebayo Akinfenwa	England	Northampton Town	Accrington Stanley*	2–4	10 November 2012	
Tom Pope	England	Port Vale*	Bristol Rovers	4–0	20 November 2012	
Kevin Ellison	England	Morecambe*	Wimbledon	3–1	24 November 2012	
Ricky Holmes	England	Barnet*	Burton Albion	3–2	21 December 2012	
Dani López	Spain	Barnet*	Morecambe	4–1	9 March 2013	
Jon Parkin	England	Fleetwood Town	Accrington Stanley*	0–3	12 March 2013	
Lee Molyneux	England	Accrington Stanley*	Barnet	3–2	16 March 2013	
Tom Pope	England	Port Vale*	Cheltenham Town	3–2	29 March 2013	
Lee Hughes	England	Port Vale*	Burton Albion	7–1	5 April 2013	
Steven Schumacher	England	Fleetwood Town*	Newport County	4–1	2 November 2013	
Antoni Sarcevic	England	Fleetwood Town*	Mansfield Town	5–4	23 November 2013	
Scott Hogan	England	Rochdale	Wimbledon*	0–3	8 February 2014	
Dave Syers	England	Scunthorpe United*	Portsmouth	5–1	22 February 2014	
Scott Hogan	England	Rochdale*	Oxford United	3–0	1 March 2014	
Lee Molyneux	England	Accrington Stanley*	Chesterfield	3–1	8 March 2014	
Hallam Hope	England	Bury*	Portsmouth	4–4	26 April 2014	
Danny Hollands	England	Portsmouth*	Plymouth Argyle	3–3	3 May 2014	
Jean-Louis Akpa Akpro	France	Shrewsbury Town*	Bury	5–0	21 October 2014	
Mark Cullen	England	Luton Town*	Dagenham & Redbridge	3–1	21 October 2014	
Aaron O'Connor	England	Newport County	Bury*	1–3	22 November 2014	
Reuben Reid	England	Plymouth Argyle	Exeter City*	1–3	21 February 2015	
Matt Tubbs	England	Portsmouth	Cambridge United*	2–6	21 February 2015	
Jamie Cureton	England	Dagenham & Redbridge*	Wimbledon	4–0	6 April 2015	
Jabo Ibehre	England	Carlisle United*	Cambridge United	4–4	15 August 2015	
Marc McNulty	Scotland	Portsmouth*	York City	6–0	24 November 2015	
Chris Whelpdale	England	Stevenage*	Morecambe	4–3	28 November 2015	
Oli McBurnie	Scotland	Newport County*	Luton Town	3–0	28 November 2015	
Matty Taylor	England	Bristol Rovers*	Wycombe Wanderers	3–0	1 December 2015	
Jack Compton	Wales	Yeovil Town	AFC Wimbledon*	2–3	30 January 2016	
Matty Taylor	England	Bristol Rovers*	Hartlepool United	4–1	1 March 2016	
Kemar Roofe	England	Oxford United*	Dagenham & Redbridge	4–0	15 March 2016	
Omar Bogle	England	Grimsby Town*	Stevenage	5–2	27 August 2016	
Andy Williams	England	Doncaster Rovers*	Yeovil Town	4–1	27 August 2016	
Danny Hylton	England	Luton Town*	Wycombe Wanderers	4–1	3 September 2016	
Charlie Wyke	England	Carlisle United*	Mansfield Town	5–2	26 November 2016	
Ollie Watkins	England	Exeter City	Newport County*	1–4	31 December 2016	
Kurtis Guthrie	England	Colchester United*	Carlisle United	4–1	7 January 2017	
Matt Godden	England	Stevenage*	Newport County	3–1	7 January 2017	
Jimmy Smith	England	Crawley Town	Colchester United*	2–3	14 February 2017	
Josh Koroma	England	Leyton Orient	Newport County*	0–4	4 March 2017	
Medy Elito	England	Cambridge United	Carlisle United*	0–3	11 March 2017	
John Marquis	England	Doncaster Rovers	Grimsby Town*	1–5	1 April 2017	
Chris Dagnall	England	Crewe Alexandra*	Barnet	4–1	6 May 2017	
James Collins	Ireland	Luton Town*	Yeovil Town	8–2	5 August 2017	
Jodi Jones	England	Coventry City*	Notts County	3–0	5 August 2017	
Frank Nouble	England	Newport County*	Chesterfield	4–1	26 August 2017	
Shaq Coulthirst	England	Barnet	Swindon Town*	1–4	2 September 2017	
Luke Berry	England	Luton Town*	Stevenage	7–1	14 October 2017	
Craig Mackail-Smith	Scotland	Wycombe Wanderers*	Crawley Town	4–0	18 November 2017	
Danny Hylton	England	Luton Town*	Cambridge United	7–0	18 November 2017	
Mohamed Eisa	Sudan	Cheltenham Town*	Port Vale	5–1	10 February 2018	
Alfie Potter	England	Mansfield Town*	Newport County	5–0	13 February 2018	
Marc McNulty	Scotland	Coventry City*	Grimsby Town	4–0	24 March 2018	
Alex Revell	England	Stevenage*	Exeter City	3–1	28 April 2018	
Marc McNulty	Scotland	Coventry City	Cheltenham Town*	1–6	28 April 2018	
JJ Hooper	England	Grimsby Town	Forest Green Rovers*	0–3	5 May 2018	
Michael Doughty	Wales	Swindon Town*	Macclesfield Town	3–2	4 August 2018	
Alex Fisher	England	Yeovil Town	Notts County*	0–4	17 August 2018	
Matt Crooks	England	Northampton Town	Macclesfield Town*	0–5	23 October 2018	
Chris O'Grady	England	Oldham Athletic*	Bury	4–2	15 December 2018	
Jayden Stockley	England	Exeter City	Oldham Athletic*	2–3	22 December 2018	
George Williams	Wales	Forest Green Rovers	Newport County*	1–4	26 December 2018	
Nicky Maynard	England	Mansfield Town*	Oldham Athletic	6–1	12 October 2019	
Eoin Doyle	Ireland	Swindon Town	Crawley Town*	0–4	26 October 2019	
Keshi Anderson	England	Swindon Town*	Cambridge United	4–0	26 December 2019	
Nicky Maynard	England	Mansfield Town	Cambridge United*	2–3	1 January 2020	
Ian Henderson	England	Salford City	Grimsby Town*	0–4	19 September 2020	
Jamille Matt	Jamaica	Forest Green Rovers	Scunthorpe United*	1–4	10 October 2020	
Paul Mullin	England	Cambridge United*	Port Vale	3–1	20 October 2020	
Jevani Brown	England	Colchester United*	Stevenage	3–1	3 November 2020	
Danny Johnson	England	Leyton Orient*	Harrogate Town	3–0	21 November 2020	
Ryan Bowman	England	Exeter City*	Colchester United	6–1	24 November 2020	
Ryan Bowman	England	Exeter City*	Tranmere Rovers	5–0	12 December 2020	
Max Watters	England	Crawley Town*	Barrow	4–2	12 December 2020	
Jordan Bowery	England	Mansfield Town*	Port Vale	4–0	2 January 2021	
Matt Jay	England	Exeter City*	Leyton Orient	4–0	6 March 2021	
Brendan Kiernan	England	Harrogate Town*	Cambridge United	5–4	30 April 2021	
Andy Cook	England	Bradford City*	Stevenage	4–1	17 August 2021	
Nicky Cadden	England	Forest Green Rovers*	Crawley Town	6–3	21 August 2021	
Aaron Drinan	Ireland	Leyton Orient*	Hartlepool United	5–0	30 October 2021	
Paul Lewis	England	Northampton Town*	Carlisle United	3–0	30 October 2021	
Dom Telford	England	Newport County*	Stevenage	5–0	30 October 2021	
Harry McKirdy^{4}	England	Swindon Town*	Northampton Town	5–2	1 January 2022	
Jack Muldoon	England	Harrogate Town*	Oldham Athletic	3–0	22 January 2022	
Brandon Thomas-Asante	England	Salford City*	Scunthorpe United	5–1	19 March 2022	
Aaron Collins	Wales	Bristol Rovers	Rochdale*	3–4	30 April 2022	
Danny Johnson	England	Walsall*	Hartlepool United	4–0	30 July 2022	
Billy Waters	England	Barrow*	Colchester United	3–1	1 November 2022	
Matt Smith	England	Salford City	Grimsby Town*	1–4	29 December 2022	
Charlie Austin^{4}	England	Swindon Town	Rochdale*	4–4	18 March 2023	
Dan Kemp	England	Hartlepool United	Grimsby Town*	1–4	7 April 2023	
Josh Gordon	England	Barrow*	Crawley Town	4–0	10 April 2023	
Callum Hendry	Scotland	Salford City	Tranmere Rovers*	3–4	19 August 2023	
Jake Young^{4}	England	Swindon Town*	Crawley Town	6–0	26 August 2023	
Andy Cook	England	Bradford City	Newport County*	1–4	23 September 2023	
Troy Deeney	England	Forest Green Rovers	Notts County*	4–3	23 September 2023	
Isaac Olaofe	England	Stockport County*	Wrexham	5–0	23 September 2023	
Ali Al-Hamadi	Iraq	AFC Wimbledon*	Tranmere Rovers	4–1	30 September 2023	
JJ McKiernan	England	Morecambe	Colchester United*	1–3	7 October 2023	
Isaac Hutchinson	England	Walsall*	Gillingham	4–1	14 October 2023	
Freddie Draper	England	Walsall	Newport County*	3–3	20 October 2023	
Matt Smith	England	Salford City	Doncaster Rovers*	0–3	24 October 2023	
Paul Mullin	England	Wrexham*	Morecambe	6–0	25 November 2023	
Paddy Madden	Ireland	Stockport County*	Sutton United	8–0	16 December 2023	
Macaulay Langstaff	England	Notts County*	Morecambe	5–0	29 December 2023	
Steven Fletcher	Scotland	Wrexham*	Barrow	4–1	1 January 2024	
Matt Smith	England	Salford City	Crewe Alexandra*	2–3	27 January 2024	
Hiram Boateng	England	Mansfield Town*	Harrogate Town	9–2	13 February 2024	
Paul Mullin	England	Wrexham*	Accrington Stanley	4–0	2 March 2024	
Paddy Madden	Ireland	Stockport County	Sutton United*	1–3	6 April 2024	
Paddy Madden	Ireland	Stockport County	Notts County*	2–5	16 April 2024	
Omar Bugiel	Lebanon	AFC Wimbledon*	Walsall	5–1	27 April 2024	
Matty Stevens	England	AFC Wimbledon*	Carlisle United	4–0	12 October 2024	
Harry Smith	England	Swindon Town*	Fleetwood Town	3–1	7 December 2024	
Bobby Kamwa	Cameroon	Newport County*	Milton Keynes Dons	6–3	21 December 2024	
Bryn Morris	England	Newport County*	Milton Keynes Dons	6–3	21 December 2024	
Luke Molyneux	England	Doncaster Rovers	Tranmere Rovers*	0–3	18 April 2025	
Jack Payne	England	Colchester United*	Chesterfield	6–2	4 October 2025	
Harry Anderson	England	Colchester United*	Harrogate Town	3–1	18 October 2025	
Paddy Madden	Ireland	Accrington Stanley*	Swindon Town	4–0	18 October 2025	
Emre Tezgel	England	Crewe Alexandra*	Grimsby Town	3–2	25 October 2025	
Michael Mellon	Scotland	Oldham Athletic*	Tranmere Rovers	3–1	20 December 2025	
Michael Cheek	England	Bromley	Crawley Town*	1–3	29 December 2025	
Fabrizio Cavegn	Switzerland	Bristol Rovers	Shrewsbury Town*	0–3	1 January 2026	
Callum Paterson	Scotland	Milton Keynes Dons*	Shrewsbury Town	5–1	24 January 2026	
Ben Thompson	England	Bromley	Gillingham*	1–4	31 January 2026	
Jack Payne	England	Colchester United*	Barnet	4–1	21 February 2026	
Ellis Harrison	Wales	Bristol Rovers*	Cheltenham Town	4–0	25 April 2026	
Jaze Kabia	Ireland	Grimsby Town*	Swindon Town	4–0	25 April 2026	
Callum Stead^{5}	England	Barnet*	Gillingham	6–2	25 April 2026	

== Multiple hat-tricks ==
The following table lists players who have scored two or more hat-tricks.

Rank	Player	Hat-tricks
1	(England) Chris Dagnall	5
2	(England) Jamie Forrester	4
2	(England) Lee Hughes	4
2	(England) Phil Jevons	4
2	(Republic of Ireland) Paddy Madden	4
6	(England) Adam Le Fondre	3
6	(England) Jack Lester	3
6	(Scotland) Marc McNulty	3
6	(England) Paul Mullin	3
6	(England) Jon Parkin	3
6	(England) Tom Pope	3
6	(England) Matt Smith	3
6	(England) Nathan Tyson	3
12	(England) Lionel Ainsworth	2
12	(England) Paul Benson	2
12	(England) Ryan Bowman	2
12	(England) Andy Cook	2
12	(England) Andy Cooke	2
12	(England) Clayton Donaldson	2
12	(England) Kevin Ellison	2
12	(England) Karl Hawley	2
12	(England) Scott Hogan	2
12	(England) Glynn Hurst	2
12	(England) Danny Hylton	2
12	(England) Aaron McLean	2
12	(England) Nicky Maynard	2
12	(England) Lee Molyneux	2
12	(England) Chris O'Grady	2
12	(England) Jack Payne	2
12	(England) Reuben Reid	2
12	(England) Matty Taylor	2
12	(England) Mark Wright	2
