= Shaquille Hunter =

English footballer

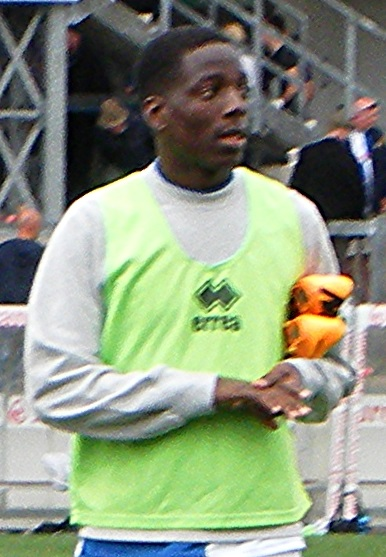
- Hunter playing for Bristol Rovers in 2013

Personal information
- Full name: Shaquille Junior Anthony Hunter
- Date of birth: 29 August 1995 (age 31)
- Place of birth: Birmingham, England
- Position: Winger

Youth career
- Bristol Rovers

Senior career*
Years	Team	Apps	(Gls)
2013	Bristol Rovers	3	(0)
2014–2015	Mangotsfield United		
2015	Bristol City	0	(0)
2016–2017	Bath City	27	(4)
2017–2018	Weston-super-Mare	10	(1)
- * Club domestic league appearances and goals as of 23:06, 22 May 2018 (UTC)

Shaquille Junior Anthony Hunter (born 29 August 1995) is an English former semi-professional footballer who played as a winger.

== Career ==
Hunter was born in Birmingham, West Midlands. He began his career with Bristol Rovers, firstly as an unused substitute in a second round Football League Cup tie against Leyton Orient on his 16th birthday. In 2012, it was reported that Premier League clubs Fulham, Liverpool and Manchester City were all interested in Hunter. He made his professional debut in a 2–1 defeat against Exeter City on 3 August 2013. He left Rovers in December 2013 due to disciplinary problems. In September 2014 he joined Mangotsfield United, before having a brief spell with Bristol City, although he failed to make any first team appearances for them.

He spent the 2016 pre-season on trial with Bath City, eventually signing a one-year deal at the club.

== Career statistics ==
As of match played 2 December 2017

Appearances and goals by club, season and competition
Club	Season	League			FA Cup		League Cup		Other		Total	
Club	Season	Division	Apps	Goals	Apps	Goals	Apps	Goals	Apps	Goals	Apps	Goals
Bristol Rovers	2013–14	League Two	3	0	0	0	1	0	0	0	4	0
Mangotsfield United	2014–15	SFL - Division One S & W	1	0	0	0	–		0	0	1	0
Bath City	2016–17	National League South	27	4	2	0	–		4 (Note: Two appearances in the FA Trophy; two appearances and a goal in the Somerset Premier Cup)	1	33	5
Weston-super-Mare	2017–18	National League South	10	1	0	0	–		1	0	11	1
Career total			41	5	2	0	1	0	5	1	49	6
