= Tom Lockyer =

Welsh footballer (born 1994)

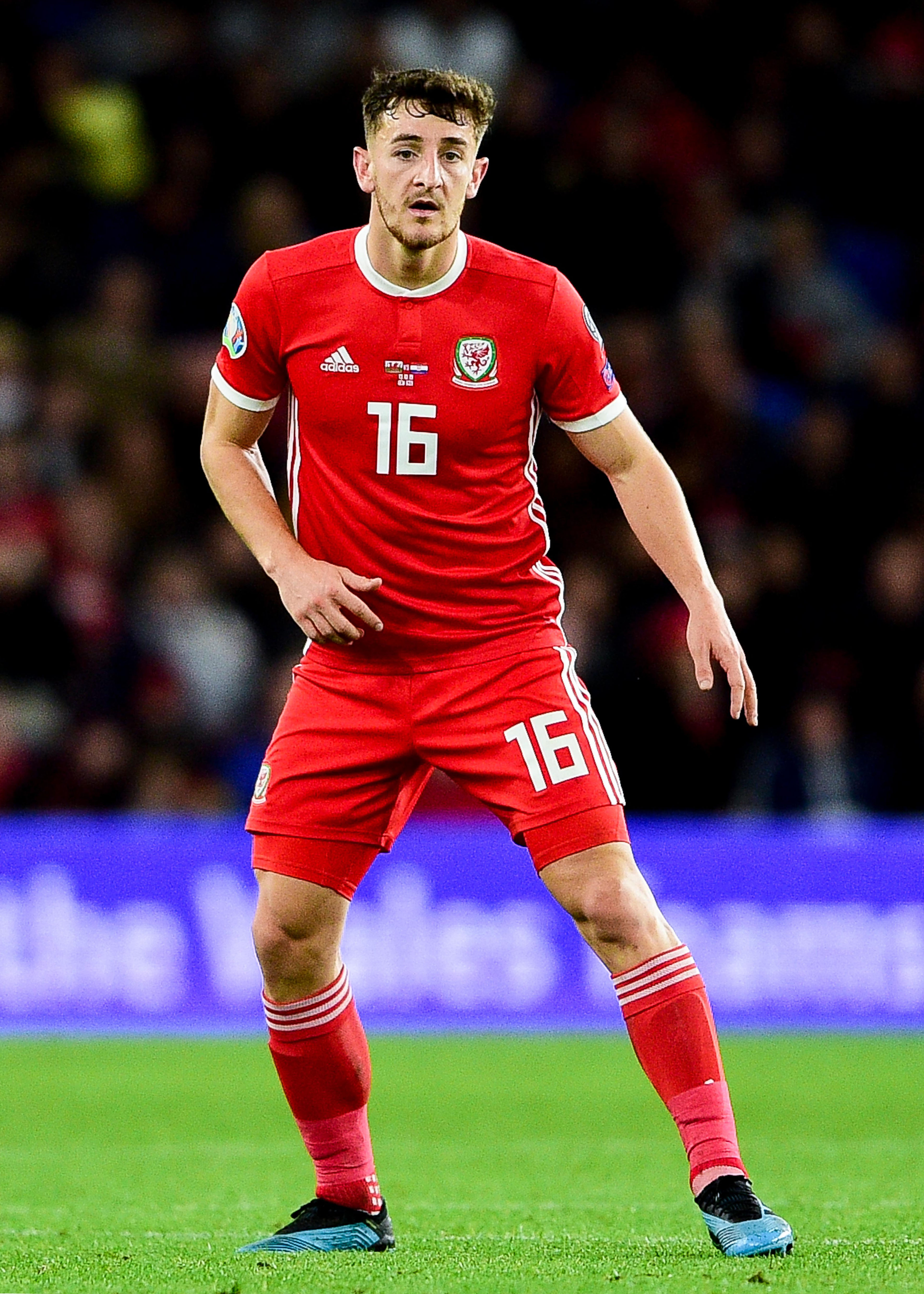
- Lockyer playing for Wales in 2019

Personal information
- Full name: Thomas Alun Lockyer
- Date of birth: 3 December 1994 (age 31)
- Place of birth: Cardiff, Wales
- Height: 6 ft 1 in (1.85 m)
- Position: Centre-back

Team information
- Current team: Melbourne Victory
- Number: 15

Youth career
- Radyr Rangers
- 2006–2011: Cardiff City
- 2011–2012: Bristol Rovers

Senior career*
Years	Team	Apps	(Gls)
2012–2019	Bristol Rovers	255	(6)
2019–2020	Charlton Athletic	43	(1)
2020–2025	Luton Town	102	(5)
2025–2026	Bristol Rovers	16	(0)
2026–	Melbourne Victory	5	(0)

International career
2015–2016	Wales U21	7	(0)
2017–2023	Wales	16	(0)
- * Club domestic league appearances and goals as of 10:13, 3 May 2026 (UTC)

Thomas Alun Lockyer (born 3 December 1994) is a Welsh professional footballer who plays as a centre-back for A-League Men club Melbourne Victory.

Lockyer played for Radyr Rangers, Cardiff City and Bristol Rovers at youth level before making his senior debut for the latter in 2013. He joined Charlton Athletic in 2019, before departing the club a season later for Luton Town. Having been Luton's captain since the 2022–23 season, he was part of the squad that won Luton the first promotion to the Premier League in the club's history. During a Premier League match in December 2023, Lockyer suffered a cardiac arrest on the pitch; he was resuscitated and was later fitted with an implantable cardioverter-defibrillator.

At international level, Lockyer represented Wales at under-21 level before making his senior debut for the Wales national team in November 2017. He was included in the squads for UEFA Euro 2020 and the 2022 FIFA World Cup.

== Club career ==
=== Bristol Rovers ===
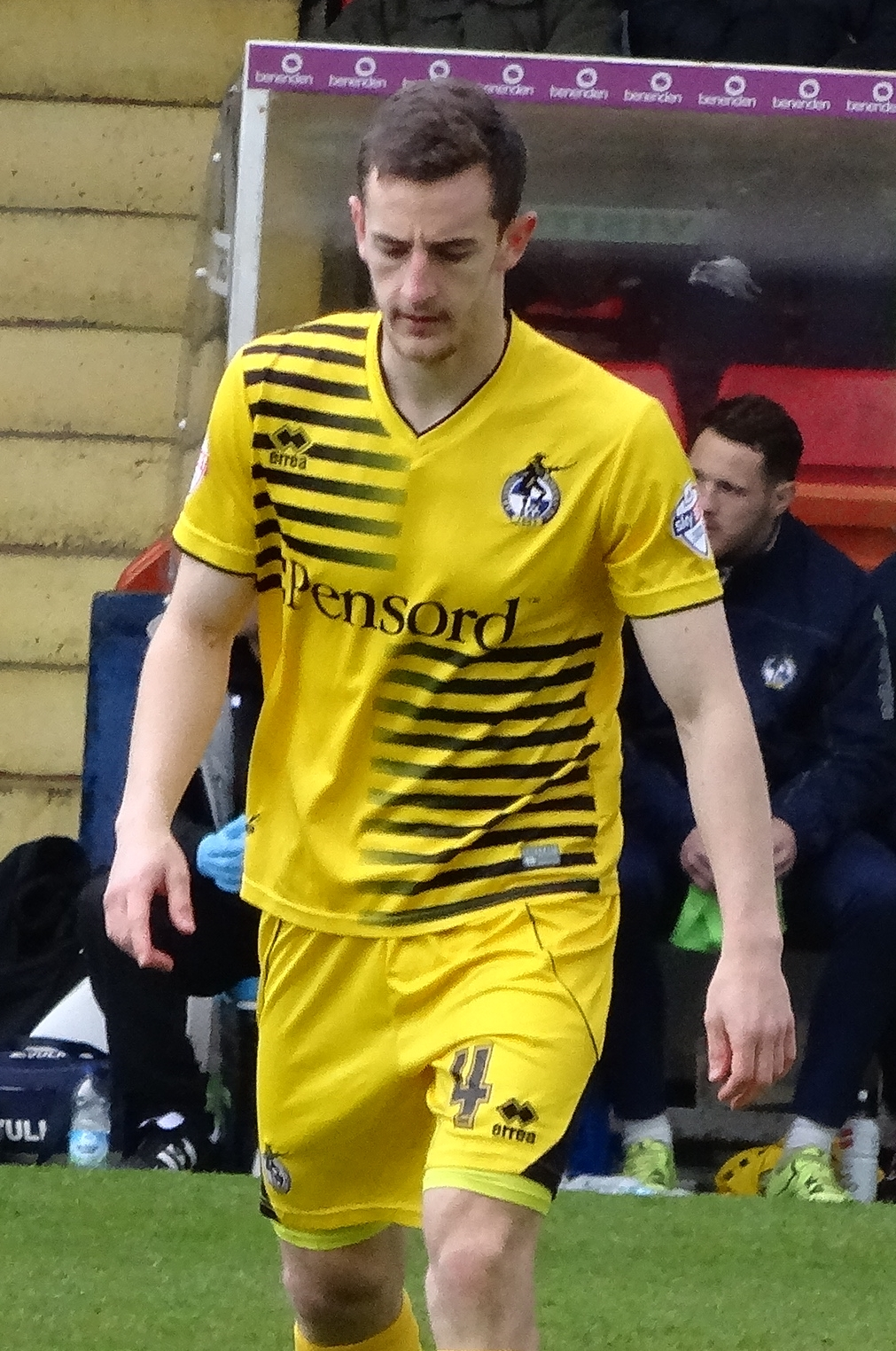
Lockyer playing for Bristol Rovers in 2016

Lockyer was born and raised in Cardiff. Lockyer started his career at Radyr Rangers. He joined Cardiff City as a youth aged 11, but was released aged 16, as Cardiff deemed him to be too small to play his preferred position of centre back. Lockyer then signed a scholarship for Bristol Rovers in 2011 and went on to make his debut on 12 January 2013, replacing Ellis Harrison, 85 minutes into a 3–0 win over Fleetwood Town at Highbury Stadium. He made his home debut two months later on 12 March 2013, replacing Oliver Norburn in the 74th minute in a 2–0 win over Port Vale. He signed his first professional contract in May 2013, after making his previous appearances whilst still a youth team player.

Lockyer scored his first league goal in a 1–0 win for Bristol Rovers over Northampton Town on 31 August 2013.

On 17 March 2014, Lockyer signed a new two-year contract extension with Rovers. After Rovers were relegated out of League Two in the 2013–14 season, Lockyer became a very important part of a very successful season after seeing the club get promoted first time of asking. In that season he managed to score one goal vs Grimsby Town. As Rovers returned to League Two, he was a first-team regular and was rewarded by being named the Football League Young Player of the Month for December 2015 after consistent good performances.

He made his 200th appearance for Rovers on 19 August 2017, in a 3–2 victory over Bury, in which he scored the opener.

He departed Bristol Rovers following the expiration of his contract at the end of the 2018–19 season.

=== Charlton Athletic ===
Lockyer joined Charlton Athletic, who were newly promoted to the Championship, on 28 June 2019 on a two-year contract. His first and only goal for the club was the equaliser in a 2–2 home draw with West Bromwich Albion on 11 January 2020. After playing every minute of 43 league appearances in the 2019–20 season and missing only three matches due to suspension, Lockyer triggered a relegation release clause in his contract in August 2020, allowing him to join another club for free.

=== Luton Town ===
Lockyer signed for another Championship club, Luton Town, on 1 September 2020 on a free transfer. His debut came two weeks later in a 1–0 EFL Cup second round victory over Reading. In January 2022, Lockyer scored his first goal for the club with his side's first in a 2–1 win over Bristol City, saying after the match that he had dreamed of scoring against his old rivals.

During the 2022–23 season, Lockyer continued to grow as a player, earning the captaincy following an injury to Sonny Bradley. As the season developed, he earned comparisons from his management team to legendary defenders Franco Baresi and Franz Beckenbauer. On 23 April 2023, Lockyer was named in the EFL Championship Team of the Season. At Luton's end of season awards, he took home five awards, most notably the Player of the Season award. On 16 May 2023, he scored Luton's all important second goal to defeat Sunderland and send the club to Wembley Stadium for the Championship play-off final.

Lockyer was in the starting line-up for the 2023 Championship play-off final against Coventry City, but was stretchered off the pitch after collapsing in the 11th minute of the first half and taken to hospital. During Luton's victory celebrations following the penalty shoot-out, the Luton players paraded a Lockyer named playing shirt as they received the trophy and the club posted a photo of Lockyer celebrating in his hospital bed. Luton's manager Rob Edwards admitted after the game that it felt wrong to celebrate and his thoughts were primarily with Lockyer. On 31 May, it was confirmed by the club that he would be leaving hospital the following day, with a follow-up report a week later stating that Lockyer had suffered atrial fibrillation of the heart, but he was given the all clear to resume his playing career following surgery. On 6 July 2023, it was confirmed that Lockyer had renewed his contract with Luton Town, one week after his previous contract ran out.

On 12 August 2023, Lockyer captained Luton in the club's first Premier League match as they lost 4–1 to Brighton & Hove Albion on the opening day of the 2023–24 season. On 30 September, Lockyer scored his first Premier League goal in a 2–1 win at Everton – Luton's first win in the competition and first top division win in 31 years.

During a match against Bournemouth on 16 December 2023, Lockyer was stretchered off the pitch after collapsing in the second half, having suffered a cardiac arrest. Bournemouth player Philip Billing was the first person to summon assistance to the defender before the arrival of the medical staff, who managed to resuscitate him in two minutes. The match was subsequently abandoned with the scoreline at 1–1. Luton later released a statement confirming that Lockyer was in a stable condition. After being discharged from the hospital, having had an implantable cardioverter-defibrillator fitted, he began a period of rehabilitation at home.

On 13 August 2024, Luton Town announced that Lockyer had returned to the club's training ground to begin the next phase of his rehabilitation. In December 2024, just one week before his scheduled return to development squad action, he suffered ankle ligament damage in training, requiring surgery. He was not offered a new contract at the end of the 2024–25 season, but continued his rehabilitation with the club. On 7 October 2025, following confirmation that he was able to return to playing, his departure from the Hatters was confirmed.

=== Return to Bristol Rovers ===
Following his departure from Luton Town, Lockyer returned to training with former club Bristol Rovers, reuniting with former manager Darrell Clarke following the latter's return to the club in May 2025. On 23 October 2025, he signed a contract until the end of the season with the League Two club, declaring himself to be 'back home'. On 25 October, he made his first competitive appearance since December 2023 in a 4–0 defeat to Crawley Town.

In May 2026, it was announced that Lockyer would depart Bristol Rovers upon the expiry of his contract at the end of the 2025–26 season.

=== Melbourne Victory ===
On 11 July 2026, Lockyer joined A-League Men side Melbourne Victory ahead of the 2026–27 season.

== International career ==
In October 2015, Lockyer made his Wales under-21 debut in a 0–0 draw against Denmark.

Lockyer was called up to the Welsh senior team in June 2017, remaining an unused substitute during a 1–1 draw with Serbia. He received his second call-up for the senior squad on 25 August, for the upcoming qualifiers against Austria and Moldova. He made his debut for the senior team on 14 November as a half-time substitute during a 1–1 draw with Panama.

In May 2021, Lockyer was selected for the Wales squad for the delayed UEFA Euro 2020 tournament.

On 9 November 2022, more than a year since he last played for his country, Lockyer was called up to the 26-man Wales squad for the 2022 FIFA World Cup.

On 21 November 2023, Lockyer played the full 90 minutes in a 1–1 draw against Turkey, his first competitive game for his country in over three years. This would later become his final international match to date.

== Career statistics ==
=== Club ===
As of 12 July 2026

Appearances and goals by club, season and competition
Club	Season	League			National Cup (Note: Appearances in FA Cup, Australia Cup)		League Cup		Other		Total	
Club	Season	Division	Apps	Goals	Apps	Goals	Apps	Goals	Apps	Goals	Apps	Goals
Bristol Rovers	2012–13	League Two	4	0	0	0	0	0	0	0	4	0
Bristol Rovers	2013–14	League Two	41	1	4	0	1	0	1 (Note: Appearance in Football League Trophy)	0	47	1
Bristol Rovers	2014–15	Conference Premier	44	1	2	0	—		3 (Note: Appearances in Conference Premier play-offs)	0	49	1
Bristol Rovers	2015–16	League Two	43	0	1	0	1	0	0	0	45	0
Bristol Rovers	2016–17	League One	46	0	3	0	2	0	0	0	51	0
Bristol Rovers	2017–18	League One	37	1	1	0	3	0	0	0	41	1
Bristol Rovers	2018–19	League One	40	3	2	0	2	0	4 (Note: Appearances in EFL Trophy)	1	48	4
Bristol Rovers	Total		255	6	13	0	9	0	8	1	285	7
Charlton Athletic	2019–20	Championship	43	1	0	0	0	0	—		43	1
Luton Town	2020–21	Championship	20	0	1	0	2	0	—		23	0
Luton Town	2021–22	Championship	29	1	2	0	1	0	1 (Note: Appearance(s) in Championship play-offs)	0	33	1
Luton Town	2022–23	Championship	39	3	3	0	1	1	3	1	46	5
Luton Town	2023–24	Premier League	14	1	0	0	1	0	—		15	1
Luton Town	2024–25	Championship	0	0	0	0	0	0	—		0	0
Luton Town	Total		102	5	6	0	5	1	4	1	117	7
Bristol Rovers	2025–26	League Two	16	0	2	0	0	0	1 (Note: Appearances in EFL Trophy)	0	19	0
Melbourne Victory	2026–27	A-League Men	0	0	0	0	—		0	0	0	0
Career total			416	12	21	0	14	1	13	2	464	15

=== International ===
Appearances and goals by national team and year
National team	Year	Apps	Goals
Wales	2017	1	0
Wales	2018	4	0
Wales	2019	5	0
Wales	2020	3	0
Wales	2021	1	0
Wales	2022	0	0
Wales	2023	2	0
Total		16	0

== Honours ==
Bristol Rovers

- Football League Two third-place promotion: 2015–16
- Conference Premier play-offs: 2015

Luton Town

- EFL Championship play-offs: 2023

Individual

- Football League Young Player of the Month: December 2015
- EFL Championship Team of the Season: 2022–23
- PFA Team of the Year: 2022–23 Championship
- Luton Town Player of the Season: 2022–23
