= Mark McChrystal =

Northern Irish footballer (born 1984)

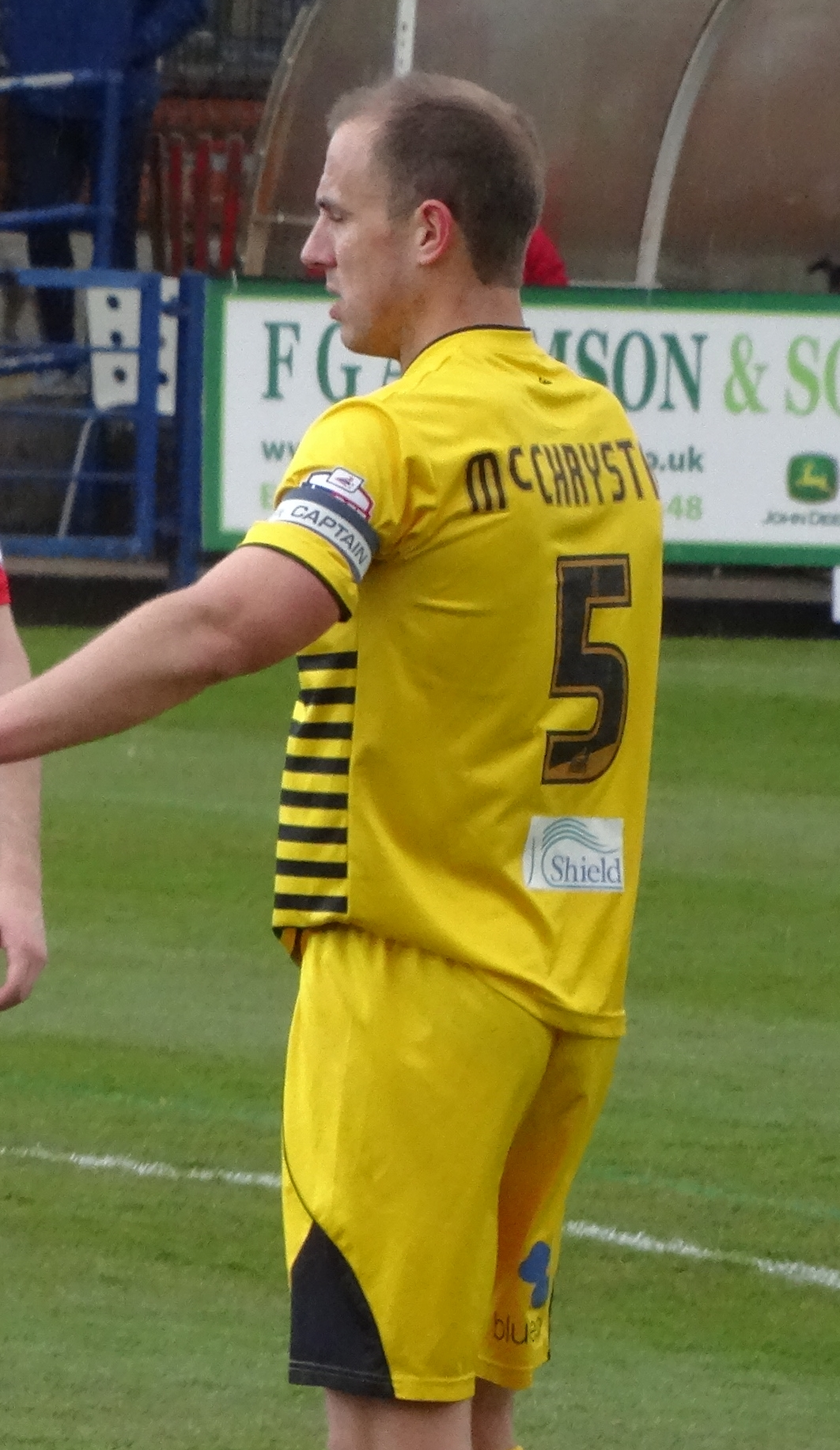
- McChrystal playing for Bristol Rovers in 2016

Personal information
- Full name: Mark Thomas McChrystal
- Date of birth: 26 June 1984 (age 42)
- Place of birth: Derry, Northern Ireland
- Position: Centre back

Team information
- Current team: Derry City (professional development coach)

Youth career
- –2003: Wolverhampton Wanderers

Senior career*
Years	Team	Apps	(Gls)
2003	Wolverhampton Wanderers	0	(0)
2003	→ Bradford City (loan)		
2003–2006	Derry City	44	(1)
2003	→ Institute (loan)	7	(0)
2007	Partick Thistle	15	(1)
2007–2009	Derry City	28	(0)
2009	Lisburn Distillery	3	(0)
2010	Derry City	30	(3)
2011–2013	Tranmere Rovers	41	(1)
2012	→ Scunthorpe United (loan)	3	(0)
2013–2017	Bristol Rovers	114	(0)
2017–2019	Crusaders	35	(1)
2019–2021	Derry City	4	(0)
Total		324	(7)

International career
- Northern Ireland Schoolboys
- Northern Ireland U18
2004–2006	Northern Ireland U21	9	(0)
- * Club domestic league appearances and goals

Mark Thomas McChrystal (born 26 June 1984) is a Northern Irish former professional footballer and coach. Born in Derry, he was a left-footed defender, he has in the past also captained the Northern Ireland under-21 side. He is professional development coach at Derry City.

== Club career ==
McChrystal began his career at Wolverhampton Wanderers where he was one of a plethora of young players from Northern Ireland playing there. After spending three years at Molineux, including a spell on loan at Bradford City in 2003, he was released by the Midlands club. McChrystal eventually returned home to sign for his local team Derry City of the League of Ireland in April 2003, despite interest from other English clubs. He was then loaned out to near neighbours Institute by Dermot Keely on a three-month deal.

His stay in the Irish League was short-lived however, and after just six games for the club, he picked up an injury in the quarter-final of the North-West Cup against Moyola Park which hastened his return to Derry City. He fought his way back into the team under Gavin Dykes and Peter Hutton but did not appear regularly during the reign of Stephen Kenny due to stiff competition in defence. Seen to be surplus to demands, he was released on 14 December 2006 after the appointment of Pat Fenlon as manager.

Within a month he had moved to Glasgow-based club, Partick Thistle. He made his Jags debut in a 2–0 defeat by Clyde on 2 January 2007 and was a regular through to the end of the season. He scored his only goal in a 4–3 defeat by Queen of the South as Partick almost came back from 4–0 down.

He re-signed for Derry City in August 2007 after turning down a move to Glentoran and being released by new Thistle manager Ian McCall. The following year he collected his first major honours, a winner's medal in the League Cup as Wexford Youths were routed 6–1 and a runners-up medal following an FAI Cup Final penalty shoot-out defeat by Bohemians.

Unhappy with his limited first team chances after returning from a broken cheekbone and non-payment of wages, he negotiated an early release from his Derry contract in August 2009. He went on trial at Huddersfield but failed to win a deal and Crewe Alexandra before joining Lisburn Distillery on a short-term deal in late 2009.

Unhappy over non-payment of his wages by Lisburn he rejoined Derry City for a third spell in January 2010, signing a one-year contract. He then went on to help Derry back into the Premier Division as First Division Champions.

On 6 January 2011 he joined English club Tranmere Rovers on a six-month contract and made his Football League debut as a 77th-minute substitute on 8 January against Walsall. At the end of the 2010–11 season he offered a new contract by the club and at the end of June he signed a two-year contract.

His first goal for the club came against Scunthorpe on 5 May 2012 in Tranmere's final match of the season.

=== Bristol Rovers ===
On 3 January 2013, he signed a short-term contract with League Two side Bristol Rovers. He made his home debut on 5 January as bottom-club Rovers were defeated 2–0 by league leaders Gillingham. On 30 April 2013, McChrystal signed a new two-year contract with the club.

On 4 September 2013, McChrystal scored his first, and what to be proved only, goal for the club with an equaliser as Rovers were defeated 2–1 by arch rivals Bristol City in the Football League Trophy First Round, the first meeting between the two in six years. McChrystal featured in the final match of the season as Rovers lost 1–0 at home to Mansfield Town, condemning the club to relegation from the Football League for the first time in the club's history.

McChrystal was appointed captain by manager Darrell Clarke for Rovers' maiden season in the National League. On 2 December 2014, after goalkeeper Steve Mildenhall was forced off with a knee injury in the 42nd minute of the match, and without a recognised goalkeeper on the bench, McChrystal went in goal, keeping a clean sheet as Rovers earned a 0–0 draw away at Wrexham. The season ended in success for Rovers as they returned to the Football League at the first time of asking, the first club to do so since 2005, defeating Grimsby Town 5–3 on penalties at Wembley after the club finished second in the regulation season.

Following their promotion back to League Two, McChrystal found first-team opportunities hard to come by at times with the defender making only ten appearances before February 2016. He featured heavily in the run-in however as Rovers gained momentum before a 92nd-minute winner from Lee Brown against Dagenham & Redbridge on the final day of the season saw Rovers sneak into the final automatic promotion place, confirming back-to-back promotions for the club. Following promotion, McChrystal signed a new contract with the club.

On 10 March 2017, it was confirmed that McCrystal had left the club after 4 years.

=== Return to Ireland and coaching career ===
McChrystal signed for Crusaders on 18 July 2017.

Derry City announced on 4 July 2019, that they had signed McChrystal on a 1-year contract. In February 2021, McChrystal was appointed player-coach at Derry City, combining this role with the role of Under-13 Coach. McChrystal stayed on at the club as a first-team coach following his retirement. In December 2022, he assumed a new role as Professional Development Coach.

== International career ==
He gained Schoolboy caps while at St. Columb's College in his native Derry, and added Under-18 caps whilst at Wolves. He appeared nine times for Northern Ireland's Under 21 team, making his debut on 18 August 2004 against Switzerland, with his last appearance coming almost two years later on 16 August 2006 against Romania.

== Personal life ==
He holds a degree in Business Studies with Accounts.

== Honours ==
Derry City

- League of Ireland Cup: 2008
- League of Ireland First Division: 2010

Bristol Rovers

- Conference Premier play-offs: 2014–15

Crusaders

- NIFL Premiership: 2017–18
