= Albert Keary =

English footballer (1886–1962)

Personal information
- Date of birth: 1886
- Place of birth: Liverpool, England
- Date of death: 1962 (aged 75–76)
- Position: Inside left

Senior career*
| Years | Team | Apps | (Gls) |
- Violet
- Bootle
- African Royal
- Liverpool Dominion
- Accrington Stanley
| 1911–1912 | Manchester City | 8 | (1) |
| 1912–1913 | Port Vale | 16 | (6) |
- * Club domestic league appearances and goals

Albert Keary (1886–1962) was an English professional footballer who played for Violet, Bootle, African Royal, Liverpool Dominion, Accrington Stanley, Manchester City, and Port Vale.

== Career ==
Keary played for Violet, Bootle, African Royal, Liverpool Dominion, and Accrington Stanley. He made his debut for Manchester City on 7 October 1911, in a 4–1 defeat to Oldham Athletic at Boundary Park. He scored his first goal in the Football League seven days later, in a 3–1 win over Bolton Wanderers at Hyde Road. He played a further six First Division games in the 1911–12 season before departing the club. He moved on to Port Vale and made his debut for the Central League side at inside-left in a 5–0 defeat at Stalybridge Celtic on 3 September 1912. After eight goals in 24 appearances he announced his retirement at the Old Recreation Ground at the end of the 1912–13 season.

== Career statistics ==
Appearances and goals by club, season and competition
| Club | Season | League | | | FA Cup | | Other | | Total | |
| Club | Season | Division | Apps | Goals | Apps | Goals | Apps | Goals | Apps | Goals |
|---|---|---|---|---|---|---|---|---|---|---|
| Manchester City | 1911–12 | First Division | 8 | 1 | 0 | 0 | 0 | 0 | 8 | 1 |
| Port Vale | 1912–13 | Central League | 16 | 6 | 4 | 0 | 4 | 2 | 24 | 8 |
| Career total | | | 24 | 7 | 4 | 0 | 4 | 2 | 32 | 9 |
