= Ellis Harrison =

Welsh footballer (born 1994)

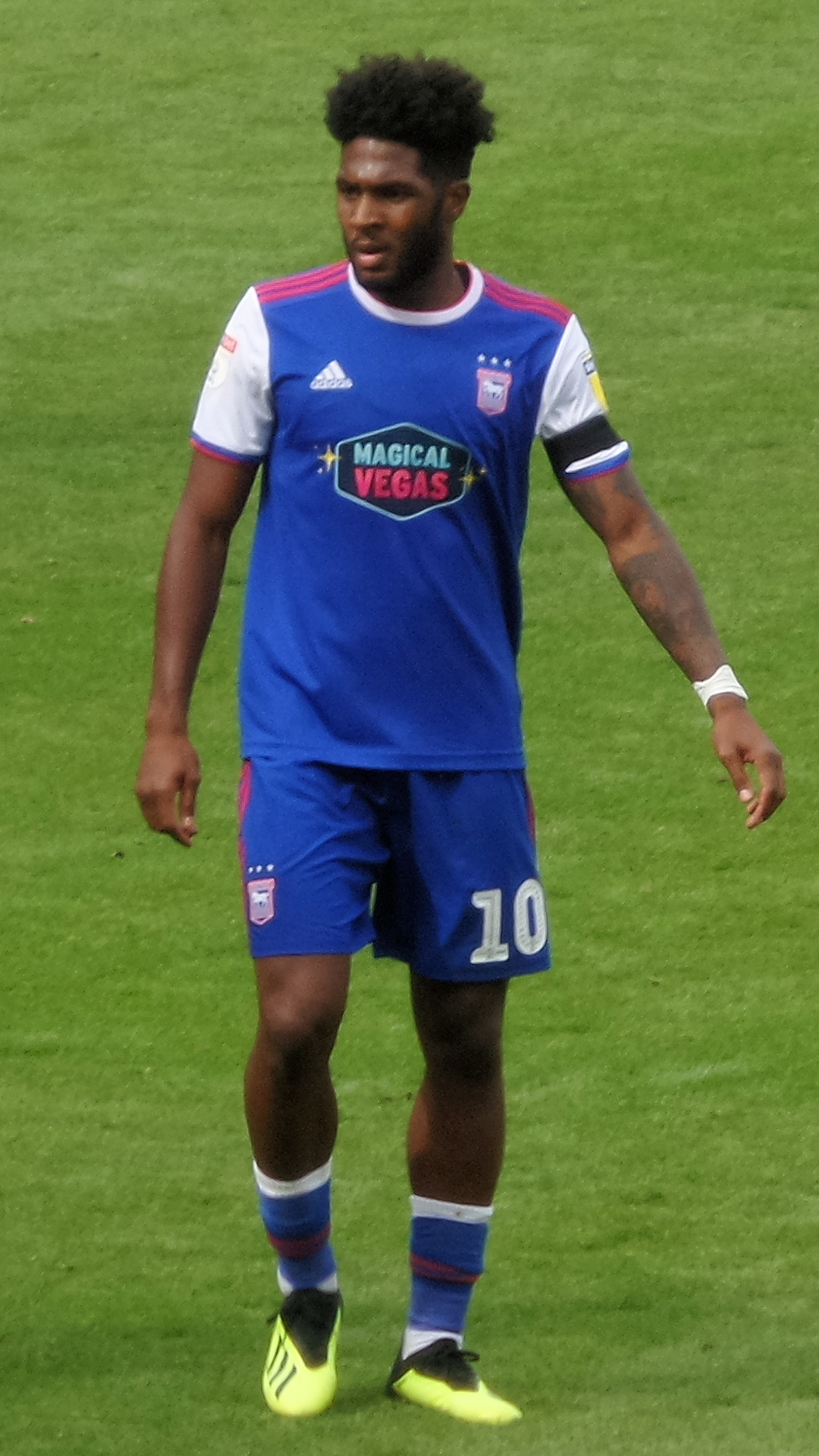
- Harrison in 2018

Personal information
- Full name: Ellis Wade Harrison
- Date of birth: 29 January 1994 (age 32)
- Place of birth: Newport, Wales
- Height: 5 ft 11 in (1.80 m)
- Position: Centre-forward

Team information
- Current team: Bristol Rovers
- Number: 19

Youth career
- –2011: Bristol Rovers

Senior career*
Years	Team	Apps	(Gls)
2011–2018	Bristol Rovers	185	(44)
2016	→ Hartlepool United (loan)	2	(0)
2018–2019	Ipswich Town	16	(1)
2019–2022	Portsmouth	64	(9)
2022	Fleetwood Town	20	(6)
2022–2023	Port Vale	34	(11)
2023–2025	Milton Keynes Dons	50	(11)
2025	→ Walsall (loan)	12	(3)
2025–	Bristol Rovers	50	(14)

International career
2013–2016	Wales U21	14	(3)
- * Club domestic league appearances and goals as of 18:24, 21 November 2026 (UTC)

Ellis Wade Harrison (born 29 January 1994) is a Welsh professional footballer who plays as a centre-forward for EFL League Two club Bristol Rovers. He represented Wales at under-21 level, scoring three goals in 14 games.

Harrison began his career at Bristol Rovers, making his senior debut at 17 in April 2011. He scored twenty goals in forty matches as Rovers secured promotion into the English Football League through the Conference Premier play-offs in the 2014–15 season, including a goal in the play-off final. He was briefly loaned out to Hartlepool United in the 2015–16 campaign, though he would score eight goals for Rovers as they secured promotion out of League Two. He then scored twenty goals at League One level throughout the next two seasons, securing a £750,000 transfer move to Ipswich Town in July 2018. However, he scored just one goal for the Championship club and returned to League One on a £450,000 transfer to Portsmouth in June 2019. He scored 20 goals in 84 games for the club before joining Fleetwood Town for an undisclosed fee in January 2022. He moved on to Port Vale for another undisclosed fee eight months later. He finished as Vale's top-scorer in the 2022–23 season and was sold to Milton Keynes Dons in September 2023. He was loaned to Walsall in February 2025. He rejoined Bristol Rovers in July 2025.

== Club career ==
=== Bristol Rovers ===
==== Early years (2011–2014) ====
Harrison began his career at Bristol Rovers and made his senior debut for the Pirates in League One on 16 April 2011, in a 1–0 defeat to Southampton at St Mary's Stadium, when he came on as a 75th-minute substitute for Jo Kuffour. This was the first time he had been in a first-team matchday squad, having been included after impressing caretaker manager Stuart Campbell during a reserve team game four days earlier.

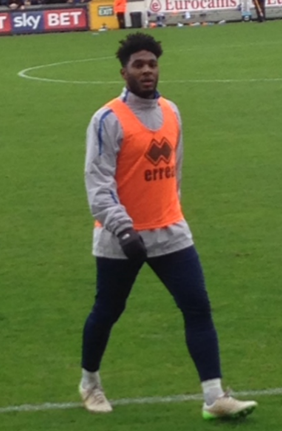
Harrison with Bristol Rovers in 2015

With the club now in League Two, Ellis made his first league start on 12 January 2013 in a 3–0 victory against Fleetwood Town, setting up Danny Woodards to score the first goal after only five minutes of play. He scored his first goal for the club two weeks later on 26 January, in a 3–1 victory away at Rotherham United. He scored both goals in a 2–1 victory over Rochdale at the Memorial Stadium on 16 March. Manager John Ward went on to praise his maturity, predicting a "good future" for the teenager.

Before the 2013–14 season, Harrison agreed on a new three-year contract with Rovers. He featured in 25 league games, but scored just once, again against Fleetwood Town. Rovers ended the season relegated to the Conference Premier, ending their 94-year stay in the English Football League. Harrison, meanwhile, was placed on the transfer list by manager Darrell Clarke.

==== Conference promotion (2014–15) ====
Harrison initially featured sporadically at the start of the 2014–15 season. Still, he scored late winners against FC Halifax Town and Lincoln City in August and September, respectively. He scored his first professional hat-trick in the FA Cup fixture away to Dorchester Town. Harrison ended the season with 17 goals in league and cup, including six in the final five league fixtures as Rovers finished just one point off top of the league and with it automatic promotion. Harrison was sent off in the play-off semi-final game with Forest Green Rovers, but returned for the final at Wembley Stadium where he scored the crucial equalising goal against Grimsby Town. Rovers went on to win the game on penalties to return to the English Football League at the first time of asking.

==== League Two promotion (2015–16) ====
The 2015–16 season saw Harrison regularly feature, both in the starting line-up and from the substitutes bench, until the end of 2015 when he was often an unused substitute. On 17 January 2016, he agreed to join fellow League Two side Hartlepool United on a month-long loan to attain more game time. He did not impress Pools manager Ronnie Moore during his time at Victoria Park. As Ellis returned to Rovers from his loan spell, he scored a crucial late equaliser against league leaders Northampton Town. This proved to be important for the club's automatic promotion race, as Rovers went up on goal difference with a victory over Dagenham & Redbridge on the final day. Harrison scored eight goals in 32 games for Rovers, also appearing twice for Hartlepool.

==== League One (2016–2018) ====
Harrison scored his first League One goal of the 2016–17 season in a 2–1 defeat to Bolton Wanderers on 17 August. On 7 January, he scored four goals in a 5–0 victory over Northampton Town. He signed a new deal in June 2017 following what he called a "very disappointing" season in which he scored nine goals in 42 games. He won the January 2018 goal of the month award for League One with his solo effort against Doncaster Rovers late on in a 3–1 victory. He ended the 2017–18 campaign with 14 goals in 49 matches, helping the Gas to a 13th-place league finish. Throughout his eight seasons at the club, he scored 52 goals in 205 league and cup appearances.

=== Ipswich Town ===
On 23 July 2018, Harrison signed a two-year deal (with an option for a third year) with Championship club Ipswich Town, joining the club for an undisclosed fee believed to be in the region of £750,000. Manager Paul Hurst said he "has got a little bit of everything" as he looked to make him the focal point of his team's attack. However, Harrison was dropped after five games and played out of position on the left side of midfield before he suffered an ankle ligament injury in training in September, which ruled him out of action for two months. He scored his first goal at Portman Road in a 1–1 draw with Sheffield United on 22 December. That would be his only goal for the Tractor Boys during his nine starts and eight substitute appearances throughout the 2018–19 relegation campaign as he was struck down with a back injury in February. The club looked to move him on after new manager Paul Lambert decided Harrison was not in his first-team plans. Harrison later credited coach Marcus Stewart with improving his game.

=== Portsmouth ===
On 21 June 2019, Harrison signed for League One side Portsmouth for an undisclosed fee, believed to be worth £450,000. Manager Kenny Jackett had originally attempted to sign him in January 2018. Harrison scored his first Portsmouth goal in his second game, a 3–0 victory over Birmingham City in an EFL Cup first round fixture at Fratton Park on 6 August. He scored ten goals in 39 appearances during the 2019–20 season, which was stopped early due to the COVID-19 pandemic in England, with Portsmouth finishing in the play-offs on points per game. He played both legs of the play-off semi-final defeat to Oxford United, which was decided on penalties following a 2–2 aggregate draw; he provided an assist and then scored an own goal in the second leg before being substituted.

He scored six goals in 31 games during the 2020–21 campaign, which saw Pompey miss out on the play-offs by two points. In June 2021, Harrison looked set to join Oxford United, however, this move fell through following Portsmouth's failure to bring in replacement Jayden Stockley. He was linked with moves to League One rivals Plymouth Argyle and Sheffield Wednesday among others, but opted to stay at Portsmouth. On 7 September, he scored a third career hat-trick in a 5–3 EFL Trophy defeat to AFC Wimbledon. He scored a total of four goals in 14 appearances in the first half of the 2021–22 season, though he started just one league fixture, and opted to leave the club after manager Danny Cowley told him he would not be offered a new contract in the summer.

=== Fleetwood Town ===
On 8 January 2022, Harrison joined League One side Fleetwood Town for an undisclosed fee. He made his debut that day, scoring the only goal in a relegation six-pointer victory over Doncaster Rovers. Manager Stephen Crainey said that "hopefully, he can follow that up and build on it with a few more". With Fleetwood having survived relegation on goal difference, Harrison signed a new one-year contract with the club at the end of the 2021–22 season, having scored six goals in 18 matches since arriving at the Highbury Stadium.

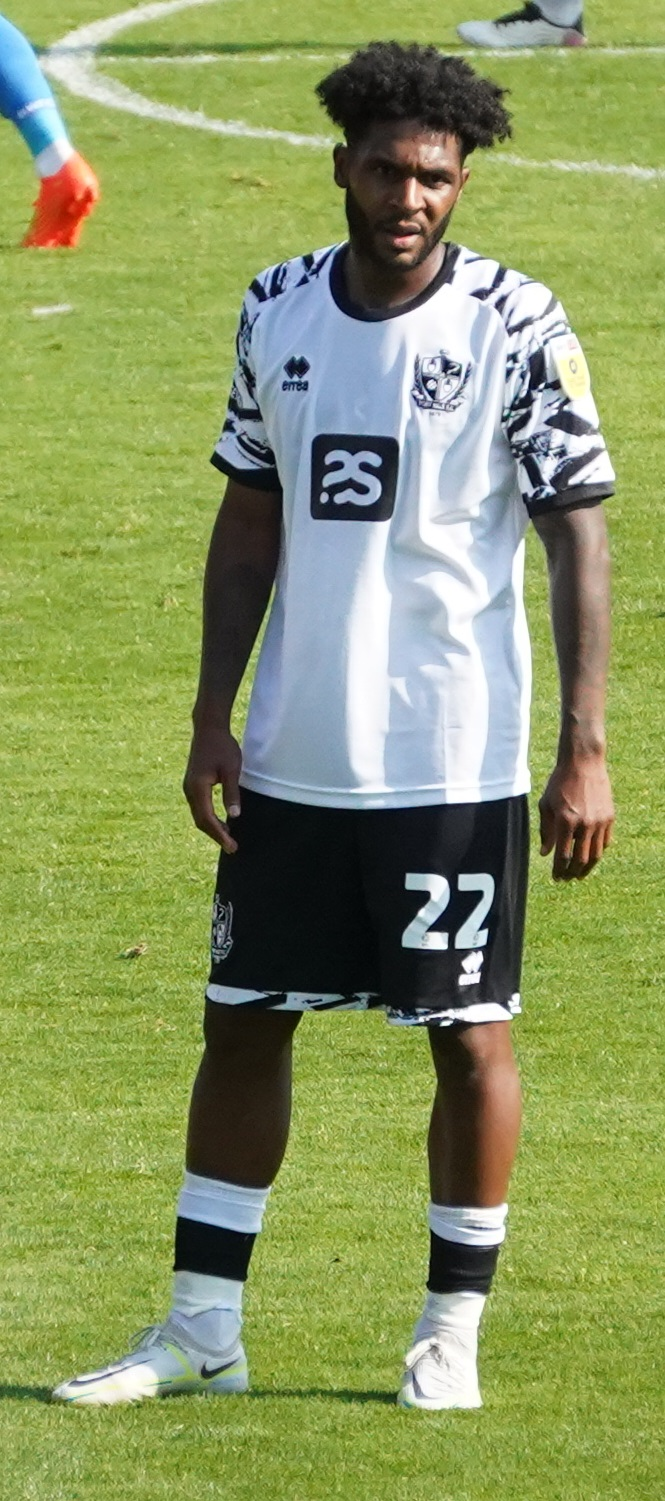
Harrison playing for Port Vale (August 2022)

=== Port Vale ===
On 11 August 2022, Harrison signed for League One club Port Vale for an undisclosed fee. Manager Darrell Clarke said: "I know a lot about Ellis because I made him, no disrespect to him, but Ellis would tell you that himself". He scored his first goal for the Valiants in a 2–1 defeat at Milton Keynes Dons six days later. He developed an effective strike partnership with James Wilson and was named as Vale's Player of the Month for both August and September. His overhead kick against former club Bristol Rovers on 22 April was voted as the club's goal of the season. He was the club's top-scorer in the 2022–23 campaign with 11 goals in 34 games.

Speaking in August 2023, new manager Andy Crosby said that "there is interest in Ellis from a few clubs... [but] we will try and take care of the interests of the club and player." Harrison left the club on transfer deadline day after a replacement was secured in Ryan Loft.

=== Milton Keynes Dons ===
On 1 September 2023, Harrison signed for League Two club Milton Keynes Dons for an undisclosed fee. He made his debut on eight days later as a 67th-minute substitute in a 1–1 draw with Notts County at Stadium MK. He scored eight goals from 35 appearances in the 2023–24 campaign, including two appearances in the play-off semi-final defeat to Crawley Town.

On 21 September 2024, he scored the opening goal of a 1–1 draw with Doncaster Rovers, only to be later sent off for a challenge on Owen Bailey. On 4 February 2025, he signed on loan at fellow League Two club Walsall until the end of the 2024–25 season. The Sadlers reported that they had beaten competition from in League One and League Two for his signature and head coach Mat Sadler felt his "wealth of experience" would be "vital" as the league leaders looked to recover form following the departure of top-scorer Nathan Lowe. He was released by MK Dons upon the expiry of his contract.

=== Return to Bristol Rovers ===
On 29 July 2025, Harrison returned to League Two club Bristol Rovers on a one-year deal, once again reuniting with manager Darrell Clarke, whom had also returned to the club earlier in the summer. On 23 August, he scored his first goal since his return, the only goal in a 1–0 victory over Cambridge United. On 25 April 2026, Harrison scored a hat-trick as Rovers defeated Cheltenham Town to secure their eighth consecutive win, a run that saw Harrison score seven goals in this period. Following the match, as his third goal saw him reach double digits for league goals, manager Steve Evans suggested that he was keen to extend Harrison's contract beyond the end of the season. He was named as the club's Player of the Month for April, and nominated as League Two Player of the Month for his six goals in 260 minutes on the pitch. He scored 14 goals in 44 games over the course of the 2025–26 season, and signed a new one-year contract in the summer.

== International career ==
Harrison was called up to the Wales under-21 squad for the fixture against Moldova on 22 March 2013. He made his Wales under-21 debut on 11 October 2013, in a 2–0 win over Lithuania. He scored his first international goal while gaining his second cap in the 4–0 win over San Marino four days later in a 2015 UEFA European Under-21 Championship qualification game at Nantporth. He scored two further goals in the nation's unsuccessful qualification attempt for the 2017 UEFA European Under-21 Championship, in victories home and away against Armenia. He won a total of 14 caps at under-21 level, scoring three goals.

== Style of play ==
Harrison has been described as a "physical" centre-forward by manager Darrell Clarke, who praised his stamina. He is a good all-round attacker who can hold the ball up well.

== Career statistics ==
As of match played 21 November 2026

Appearances and goals by club, season and competition
Season	Club	League			FA Cup		EFL Cup		Other		Total	
Season	Club	Division	Apps	Goals	Apps	Goals	Apps	Goals	Apps	Goals	Apps	Goals
Bristol Rovers	2010–11	League One	1	0	0	0	0	0	0	0	1	0
Bristol Rovers	2011–12	League Two	0	0	0	0	0	0	0	0	0	0
Bristol Rovers	2012–13	League Two	13	3	0	0	0	0	0	0	13	3
Bristol Rovers	2013–14	League Two	25	1	2	0	1	0	1 (Note: Appearance in Football League Trophy)	0	29	1
Bristol Rovers	2014–15	Conference Premier	35	13	2	3	—		2 (Note: Appearances in Conference Premier play-offs)	1	39	17
Bristol Rovers	2015–16	League Two	30	7	1	0	1	1	0	0	32	8
Bristol Rovers	2016–17	League One	37	8	2	0	2	1	1 (Note: Appearance(s) in EFL Trophy)	0	42	9
Bristol Rovers	2017–18	League One	44	12	1	0	3	2	1	0	49	14
Hartlepool United (loan)	2015–16	League Two	2	0	—		—		—		2	0
Ipswich Town	2018–19	Championship	16	1	1	0	0	0	—		17	1
Portsmouth	2019–20	League One	28	5	3	0	1	2	7 (Note: Five appearances and three goals in EFL Trophy, two appearances in EFL League One play-offs)	3	39	10
Portsmouth	2020–21	League One	25	4	3	1	1	0	2	1	31	6
Portsmouth	2021–22	League One	11	0	1	1	0	0	2	3	14	4
Portsmouth	Total		64	9	10	2	2	2	11	7	84	20
Fleetwood Town	2021–22	League One	18	6	—		—		—		18	6
Fleetwood Town	2022–23	League One	2	0	—		0	0	—		2	0
Fleetwood Town	Total		20	6	0	0	0	0	0	0	20	6
Port Vale	2022–23	League One	33	11	0	0	0	0	1	0	34	11
Port Vale	2023–24	League One	1	0	—		1	0	—		2	0
Port Vale	Total		34	11	0	0	1	0	1	0	36	11
Milton Keynes Dons	2023–24	League Two	31	8	0	0	—		4 (Note: Two appearances in the EFL Trophy and two appearances in the play-offs)	0	35	8
Milton Keynes Dons	2024–25	League Two	19	3	1	0	1	0	3	2	24	5
Milton Keynes Dons	Total		50	11	1	0	1	0	7	2	59	13
Walsall (loan)	2024–25	League Two	12	3	—		—		—		12	3
Bristol Rovers	2025–26	League Two	38	11	1	0	1	0	4	3	44	14
Bristol Rovers	2026–27	League Two	12	3	0	0	0	0	2	1	14	4
Bristol Rovers	Bristol Rovers total		235	58	9	3	8	4	11	5	263	70
Career total			433	99	18	5	12	6	28	12	494	122

== Honours ==
Bristol Rovers

- Conference Premier play-offs: 2015
- Football League Two third-place promotion: 2015–16
