= 2015–16 Bristol Rovers F.C. season =

Bristol Rovers F.C.
2015–16 season
- Chairman: Nick Higgs (until 19 February 2016); Steve Hamer (from 19 February 2016)
- Manager: Darrell Clarke
- Stadium: Memorial Stadium
- League Two: 3rd (promoted)
- FA Cup: First round proper (Eliminated by Chesham United)
- League Cup: First round (Eliminated by Birmingham City)
- League Trophy: Quarter-finals (Eliminated by Southend United)
- Top goalscorer: League: Matty Taylor (27); All: Matty Taylor (28)
- Highest home attendance: 11,130 (vs. Dagenham & Redbridge, 7 May 2016)
- Lowest home attendance: 5,819 (vs. Stevenage, 24 November 2015)
- Average home league attendance: 8,096
Home colours	Away colours

The 2015–16 season was the 133rd season in Bristol Rovers' history and their 88th in the Football League. Rovers returned to the Football League after an absence of just one season following their promotion from the Conference Premier via the play-offs.

For the second successive season, Rovers were promoted, the first time the club had achieved back to back promotions in its history. On a dramatic final day of the season in which Rovers required a win and other results to go in their favour, a 92nd-minute winner against Dagenham & Redbridge from Lee Brown sparked wild celebrations at the Memorial Stadium as the club returned to the third tier of English football for the first time in five years. Striker Matty Taylor ended the season as the top goalscorer in the top four divisions of the English football league system with 27 goals.

== Season events ==
=== Pre-season ===
==== June ====
- 1 June 2015 – Popular midfielder Stuart Sinclair signed a new contract with Rovers.
- 11 June 2015 – Former Woking defender James Clarke joined Rovers on a one-year deal.
- 17 June 2015 – Full back Daniel Leadbitter signed a contract extension with Rovers, while wingers Andy Monkhouse and Abdulai Bell-Baggie left the club.
- 19 June 2015 – Gibraltar international Jake Gosling agreed a contract extension with Rovers. Academy players Ryan Broom, Tyler Lyttle, Jay Malpas and Kieran Preston signed professional contracts.
- 22 June 2015 – Ángelo Balanta rejected a new short-term deal with Rovers and left the club.
- 30 June 2015 – Chris Lines agreed a permanent transfer from Port Vale. Lines had previously played for Rovers, his boyhood club, between 2002–11 and on loan the previous season.

==== July ====
- 2 July 2015 – Former West Ham United winger Cristian Montaño signed for Rovers. Goalkeeper Will Puddy agreed a contract extension. Defender Neal Trotman rejected the opportunity to return to Rovers for pre-season and was therefore released.
- 7 July 2015 – Youngsters Jamie Lucas and Danny Greenslade agreed contract extensions.
- 22 July 2015 – Manager Darrell Clarke agreed a new contract with Rovers.
- 31 July 2015 – Billy Bodin signed a short-term deal with Rovers.

=== August ===
- 4 August 2015 – Winger Jeffrey Monakana signed on a month-long loan from Brighton & Hove Albion.
- 7 August 2015 – Jamie Lucas joins Boreham Wood on a month-long loan.
- 11 August 2015 – Rovers were eliminated from the League Cup first round, losing 2–1 to Championship side Birmingham City.
- 14 August 2015 – Chesterfield goalkeeper Aaron Chapman joined Rovers on a month-long loan. Rovers midfielder Ryan Broom joined Taunton Town on loan for one month.
- 20 August 2015 – Young midfielder Dominic Thomas joined Paulton Rovers on a month-long loan.
- 21 August 2015 – Striker Nathan Blissett joined National League side Tranmere Rovers on loan for one month.

=== September ===
- 1 September 2015 – Defender Adam Drury joined Rovers on a non-contract basis.
- 7 September 2015 – Adam Drury left Rovers just six days after joining, with the club citing "personal reasons".
- 11 September 2015 – Wigan Athletic goalkeeper Lee Nicholls joined Rovers on a three-month loan deal.
- 17 September 2015 – Colin Sexstone joined Rovers as a non-executive director. Sexstone had previously been a director at Gloucestershire CCC, Bristol City and Plymouth Argyle.

=== November ===
- 8 November 2015 – Rovers suffered a humiliating defeat in the first round proper of the FA Cup, losing 1–0 at home to Chesham United of the Southern League Premier.
- 11 November 2015 – Rovers are knocked out of their final cup competition, losing 1–0 away to League One side Southend United in the Football League Trophy.
- 23 November 2015 – Millwall forward Paris Cowan-Hall joined Rovers on a month-long loan. Winger Billy Bodin agreed a contract extension to the end of the season.
- 26 November 2015 – Rovers sign Cambridge United forward Rory Gaffney on loan until January while Nathan Blissett left for Lincoln City, also on loan with a view to becoming dead.

=== December ===
- 8 December 2015 – Rovers striker Matty Taylor was named PFA Fans' Player of the Month for November.

=== January ===
- 5 January 2016 – Nathan Blissett left Rovers by mutual consent.
- 7 January 2016 – Experienced midfielder Liam Lawrence joined Rovers from League One side Shrewsbury Town on a contract to the end of the season.
- 14 January 2016 – Rory Gaffney returned to the club from Cambridge United after his successful loan spell, joining on a permanent contract for an undisclosed fee.
- 17 January 2016 – Defender Tom Lockyer was awarded The Football League Young Player of the Month for December.
- 18 January 2016 – Forward Ellis Harrison joined Hartlepool United on a monthlong loan.
- 28 January 2016 – Experienced forward Rory Fallon joined Rovers on non-contract terms.

=== February ===
- 19 February 2016 – Rovers were acquired by the Jordanian Al-Qadi family, founders of the Arab Jordan Investment Bank, taking a 92% shareholding in the club. As part of the deal, Wael al-Qadi became President of the club while former Swansea City chairman Steve Hamer took up the same role with Rovers. Existing chairman Nick Higgs along with board members Barry Bradshaw, Chris Jelf, Colin Sexstone and Ed Ware all stood down from the board of directors with all expect Sexstone becoming Life Vice Presidents.

=== March ===
- 7 March 2016 – Swansea City forward Oli McBurnie joined Rovers on loan until the end of the season.

=== April ===
- 8 April 2016 – Rovers manager Darrell Clarke was awarded League Two Manager of the Month for March. Clarke had led the side to six wins out of seven during the month. Striker Matty Taylor won League Two Player of the Month for March. Taylor scored eight goals in the month's seven games including a hat-trick against Hartlepool United.
- 14 April 2016 – Lee Brown signed a contract extension at Rovers which will take him into a sixth season at the club.
- 15 April 2016 – Wales under-21 international Tom Lockyer extended his contract with Rovers. DriBuild were confirmed as next season's home shirt sponsors with Powersystems UK sponsoring the away shirt.

=== May ===
- 7 May 2016 – On the final day of the season, Rovers beat Dagenham & Redbridge 2–1 to secure promotion to League One.

== First team ==
As of game played on 7 May 2016

No.	Name	Position	Nationality	Place of birth	Date of birth	Club caps	Club goals	Int. caps	Int. goals	Previous club	Notes
Goalkeepers
1	Steve Mildenhall	GK	(England)	Swindon	13 May 1979	123	0	0	0	Millwall	
22	Kieran Preston	GK	(Scotland)	Glasgow	4 October 1996	0	0	0	0	Youth team graduate	On loan at Rushall Olympic
25	Will Puddy	GK	(England)	Warminster	4 October 1987	16	0	0	0	Salisbury City	
Defenders
2	Daniel Leadbitter	RB	(England)	Newcastle upon Tyne	7 October 1990	57	1	0	0	Hereford United	
3	Lee Brown	LB	(England)	London	10 August 1990	211	20	0	0	Queens Park Rangers	
4	Tom Lockyer	CB/RB	(Wales)	Cardiff	3 December 1994	132	2	0	0	Youth team graduate	
5	Mark McChrystal	CB	(Northern Ireland)	Derry	26 June 1984	110	0	0	0	Tranmere Rovers	Club captain
6	Tom Parkes	CB	(England)	Sutton-in-Ashfield	15 January 1992	175	7	0	0	Leicester City	
15	James Clarke	RB/CB	(England)	Aylesbury	17 November 1989	37	0	0	0	Woking	
19	Danny Greenslade	LB	(England)	Belper	23 September 1996	0	0	0	0	Youth team graduate	
26	Tyler Lyttle	RB	(England)		12 November 1996	1	0	0	0	Youth team graduate	
32	Alfie Kilgour	CB	(England)	Bath		0	0	0	0	Youth team graduate	
Midfielders
7	Lee Mansell	CM	(England)	Gloucester	23 September 1982	72	7	0	0	Torquay United	Vice captain
8	Ollie Clarke	CM	(England)	Bristol	29 June 1992	99	8	0	0	Youth team graduate	
11	Jake Gosling	RM/LM	(Gibraltar)	(England) Oxford	11 August 1993	41	3	11	2	Exeter City	
14	Chris Lines	CM	(England)	Bristol	30 November 1985	209	21	0	0	Port Vale	Vice captain
16	Liam Lawrence	RM/LM	(Republic of Ireland)	(England) Retford	14 December 1981	12	1	15	2	Shrewsbury Town	
18	Dominic Thomas	CM	(England)	London	23 November 1995	0	0	0	0	Youth team graduate	
21	Cristian Montaño	RM/LM	(Colombia)	Cali	11 December 1991	28	2	0	0	América de Cali	
23	Billy Bodin	LM/CF	(Wales)	(England) Swindon	24 March 1992	38	13	0	0	Northampton Town	
24	Stuart Sinclair	CM	(England)	Houghton Conquest	9 November 1987	57	4	0	0	Salisbury City	
27	Ryan Broom	RM	(Wales)	Newport	4 September 1996	1	0	0	0	Youth team graduate	
28	Jay Malpas	CM	(England)	Bristol	25 May 1997	0	0	0	0	Youth team graduate	
Forwards
9	Ellis Harrison	CF/LM	(Wales)	Newport	29 January 1994	104	24	0	0	Youth team graduate	
10	Matty Taylor	CF	(England)		30 March 1990	91	45	0	0	Forest Green Rovers	
17	Jermaine Easter	CF	(Wales)	Cardiff	15 January 1982	47	8	12	0	Millwall	
20	Jamie Lucas	CF	(Wales)	Pontypridd	6 December 1995	2	0	0	0	Youth team graduate	On loan at Boreham Wood
29	Oli McBurnie	CF	(Scotland)	(England) Leeds	4 June 1996	5	0	0	0	On loan from Swansea City	
30	Rory Gaffney	CF	(Republic of Ireland)	Tuam	23 October 1989	24	8	0	0	Cambridge United	
33	Rory Fallon	CF	(New Zealand)	Gisborne	20 March 1982	3	0	18	4	Scunthorpe United	

=== Transfers ===
==== In ====
Date	Position	Player	Transferred from	Fee	Ref.
1 July 2015	RM	Ryan Broom	Youth team graduate		
1 July 2015	RB/CB	James Clarke	Free agent (previously with Woking)		
1 July 2015	CM	Chris Lines	Port Vale	Undisclosed	
1 July 2015	RB	Tyler Lyttle	Youth team graduate		
1 July 2015	CM	Jay Malpas	Youth team graduate		
2 July 2015	RM/LM	Cristian Montaño	Free agent (previously with América de Cali)		
31 July 2015	LM/CF	Billy Bodin	Free agent (previously with Northampton Town)		
7 January 2016	RM/LM	Liam Lawrence	Shrewsbury Town	Free transfer	
14 January 2016	CF	Rory Gaffney	Cambridge United	Undisclosed	
28 January 2016	CF	Rory Fallon	Free agent (previously with Scunthorpe United)		

==== Loans in ====
Date	Position	Player	Loaned from	End date	Ref.
4 August 2015	RM	Jeffrey Monakana	Brighton & Hove Albion	7 September 2015	
14 August 2015	GK	Aaron Chapman	Chesterfield	10 September 2015	
11 September 2015	GK	Lee Nicholls	Wigan Athletic	12 December 2015	
23 November 2015	CF	Paris Cowan-Hall	Millwall	21 December 2015	
26 November 2015	CF	Rory Gaffney	Cambridge United	4 January 2016	
7 March 2016	CF	Oli McBurnie	Swansea City	30 June 2016	

==== Out ====
Date	Position	Player	Transferred to	Fee	Ref.
30 June 2015	LM	Ángelo Balanta	Carlisle United (Note: Following Balanta's release on 22 June 2015, he later agreed to join Carlisle United on 30 June 2015.)	Free transfer	
30 June 2015	RM	Abdulai Bell-Baggie	Stockport County (Note: Following Bell-Baggie's release on 17 June 2015, he later joined Stockport County on 1 July 2015.)	Free transfer	
30 June 2015	LM	Andy Monkhouse	Grimsby Town (Note: Following Monkhouse's release on 17 June 2015, he later agree to join Grimsby Town on 24 June 2015.)	Free transfer	
30 June 2015	CB	Neal Trotman	Released		
5 January 2016	CF	Nathan Blissett	Torquay United (Note: Following Blissett's release on 5 January 2016, he later agree to join Torquay United on 14 January 2016.)	Free transfer	

==== Loans out ====
Date	Position	Player	Loaned to	End date	Ref.
7 August 2015	FW	Jamie Lucas	Boreham Wood	4 September 2015	
14 August 2015	MF	Ryan Broom	Taunton Town	14 October 2015	
20 August 2015	MF	Dominic Thomas	Paulton Rovers	26 September 2015	
21 August 2015	FW	Nathan Blissett	Tranmere Rovers	19 September 2015	
1 October 2015	FW	Jamie Lucas	Boreham Wood	29 October 2015	
1 October 2015	GK	Kieran Preston	Mangotsfield United	29 October 2015	
26 November 2015	CF	Nathan Blissett	Lincoln City	4 January 2016	
23 December 2015	RB	Tyler Lyttle	Nuneaton Town	5 April 2016	
4 January 2016	LB	Danny Greenslade	Bath City	6 April 2016	
15 January 2016	FW	Jamie Lucas	Boreham Wood	30 June 2016	
18 January 2016	FW	Ellis Harrison	Hartlepool United	20 February 2016	
26 February 2016	MF	Jake Gosling	Newport County	30 March 2016	
26 February 2016	GK	Kieran Preston	Rushall Olympic	30 June 2016	
28 February 2016	MF	Jay Malpas	Chippenham Town	24 March 2016	

== Squad statistics ==
=== Appearances, goals and cards ===
No.	Pos.	Name	League		FA Cup		League Cup		League Trophy		Total		Discipline	
No.	Pos.	Name	Apps	Goals	Apps	Goals	Apps	Goals	Apps	Goals	Apps	Goals	Yellow card	Red card
1	GK	(England) Steve Mildenhall	25(1)	0	0	0	1	0	0	0	26(1)	0	0	0
2	DF	(England) Daniel Leadbitter	28(5)	0	1	0	1	0	1	0	31(5)	0	4	0
3	DF	(England) Lee Brown	46	6	1	0	1	0	2	0	50	6	8	0
4	DF	(Wales) Tom Lockyer	42(1)	0	1	0	1	0	0	0	44(1)	0	7	0
5	DF	(Northern Ireland) Mark McChrystal	20(1)	0	1	0	0	0	2	0	22(1)	0	5	0
6	DF	(England) Tom Parkes	29(2)	0	0	0	1	0	2	0	32(2)	0	5	0
7	MF	(England) Lee Mansell	28	2	1	0	0	0	0	0	29	2	2	0
8	MF	(England) Ollie Clarke	23(11)	2	0	0	1	0	0(1)	0	24(12)	2	2	0
9	FW	(Wales) Ellis Harrison	10(20)	7	1	0	1	1	0	0	12(20)	8	6	0
10	FW	(England) Matty Taylor	38(8)	27	1	0	0(1)	0	2	1	41(9)	28	3	0
11	MF	(Gibraltar) Jake Gosling	8(10)	0	1	0	1	0	1	0	11(10)	0	1	0
14	MF	(England) Chris Lines	30(3)	0	0(1)	0	0	0	2	0	32(4)	0	4	0
15	DF	(England) James Clarke	36(1)	0	0(1)	0	1	0	1	0	37(2)	0	4	0
16	MF	(Republic of Ireland) Liam Lawrence	8(4)	1	0	0	0	0	0	0	8(4)	1	1	0
17	FW	(Wales) Jermaine Easter	21(21)	7	0(1)	0	1	0	2	1	24(22)	8	2	0
21	MF	(Colombia) Cristian Montaño	12(16)	2	0	0	0(1)	0	1(1)	0	13(18)	2	1	0
23	MF	(Wales) Billy Bodin	26(12)	13	1	0	0	0	2	0	29(12)	13	0	0
24	MF	(England) Stuart Sinclair	30	2	1	0	1	0	2	0	34	2	3	0
25	GK	(England) Will Puddy	1	0	0	0	0	0	0	0	1	0	0	0
26	DF	(England) Tyler Lyttle	1	0	0	0	0	0	0(1)	0	1(1)	0	0	0
27	MF	(Wales) Ryan Broom	0(1)	0	0	0	0(1)	0	0	0	0(2)	0	0	0
29	FW	(Scotland) Oli McBurnie	0(5)	0	0	0	0	0	0	0	0(5)	0	2	0
30	FW	(Republic of Ireland) Rory Gaffney	23(1)	8	0	0	0	0	0	0	23(1)	8	2	0
33	FW	(New Zealand) Rory Fallon	0(3)	0	0	0	0	0	0	0	0(3)	0	0	0
Players to have appeared for Bristol Rovers who are currently on loan elsewhere:
20	FW	(Wales) Jamie Lucas	0(1)	0	0	0	0	0	0(1)	0	0(2)	0	0	0
Players to have appeared for Bristol Rovers who have left:
29	MF	(England) Jeffrey Monakana	0(3)	0	0	0	0	0	0	0	0(3)	0	0	0
30	GK	(England) Aaron Chapman	5	0	0	0	0	0	0	0	5	0	0	0
31	GK	(England) Lee Nicholls	15	0	1	0	0	0	2	0	18	0	1	0
29	FW	(England) Paris Cowan-Hall	2(1)	0	0	0	0	0	0	0	2(1)	0	0	0
16	FW	(England) Nathan Blissett	0(2)	0	0	0	0	0	0(1)	0	0(3)	0	0	0

=== Goal scorers ===
Rank	Name	L2	FAC	FLC	FLT	Total
1	Matty Taylor	27	0	0	1	28
2	Billy Bodin	13	0	0	0	13
3	Rory Gaffney	8	0	0	0	8
3	Ellis Harrison	7	0	1	0	8
3	Jermaine Easter	7	0	0	1	8
6	Lee Brown	6	0	0	0	6
7	Stuart Sinclair	2	0	0	0	2
7	Cristian Montaño	2	0	0	0	2
7	Ollie Clarke	2	0	0	0	2
7	Lee Mansell	2	0	0	0	2
11	Liam Lawrence	1	0	0	0	1

==== Penalties ====
Date	Penalty Taker	Scored	Opponent	Competition
19 September	Ellis Harrison	Yes	Plymouth Argyle	League Two
3 October	Ellis Harrison	Yes	Morecambe	League Two
21 November	Matty Taylor	Yes	Crawley Town	League Two
17 January	Ellis Harrison	Yes	Oxford United	League Two

=== Disciplinary record ===
Name	L2		FAC		FLC		FLT		Total	
Name	Yellow card	Red card	Yellow card	Red card	Yellow card	Red card	Yellow card	Red card	Yellow card	Red card
Lee Brown	9	0	0	0	0	0	0	0	8	0
Tom Lockyer	6	0	1	0	0	0	0	0	7	0
Ellis Harrison	6	0	0	0	0	0	0	0	6	0
Tom Parkes	5	0	0	0	0	0	0	0	5	0
Mark McChrystal	4	0	0	0	0	0	1	0	5	0
Chris Lines	4	0	0	0	0	0	0	0	4	0
Daniel Leadbitter	4	0	0	0	0	0	0	0	4	0
James Clarke	3	0	0	0	0	0	1	0	4	0
Stuart Sinclair	3	0	0	0	0	0	0	0	3	0
Matty Taylor	3	0	0	0	0	0	0	0	3	0
Jermaine Easter	2	0	0	0	0	0	0	0	2	0
Rory Gaffney	2	0	0	0	0	0	0	0	2	0
Ollie Clarke	2	0	0	0	0	0	0	0	2	0
Lee Mansell	1	0	1	0	0	0	0	0	2	0
Oli McBurnie	2	0	0	0	0	0	0	0	2	0
Lee Nicholls	1	0	0	0	0	0	0	0	1	0
Jake Gosling	1	0	0	0	0	0	0	0	1	0
Cristian Montaño	1	0	0	0	0	0	0	0	1	0
Liam Lawrence	1	0	0	0	0	0	0	0	1	0

== Competitions ==
=== Summary ===
As of game played on 7 May 2016

Games played	50 (46 League Two, 1 FA Cup, 1 League Cup, 2 Football League Trophy)
Games won	27 (26 League Two, 0 FA Cup, 0 League Cup, 1 Football League Trophy)
Games drawn	7 (7 League Two, 0 FA Cup, 0 League Cup, 0 Football League Trophy)
Games lost	16 (13 League Two, 1 FA Cup, 1 League Cup, 1 Football League Trophy)
Win %	54%
Goals scored	80 (77 League Two, 0 FA Cup, 1 League Cup, 2 Football League Trophy)
Goals conceded	50 (46 League Two, 1 FA Cup, 2 League Cup, 1 Football League Trophy)
Goal difference	+30 (+31 League Two, −1 FA Cup, −1 League Cup, +1 Football League Trophy)
Yellow cards	67 (62 League Two, 2 FA Cup, 0 League Cup, 2 Football League Trophy)
Red cards	0 (0 League Two, 0 FA Cup, 0 League Cup, 0 Football League Trophy)
Worst discipline	Lee Brown (8 x (yellow card) )
Biggest win	3 – 0 (vs. Hartlepool United, 29 September 2015, vs. Wycombe Wanderers, 1 December 2015, vs. Dagenham & Redbridge, 19 December 2015, vs. Cambridge United, 25 March 2016, vs. Crawley Town, 2 April 2016); 4 – 1 (vs. Hartlepool United, 1 March 2016, vs. Newport County, 19 March 2016, vs. York City, 30 April 2016)
Heaviest defeat	1 – 4 (vs. Newport County, 24 October 2015)
Highest scoring match	4 – 3 (vs. Morecambe, 3 October 2015)
Most appearances	50 (Lee Brown & Matty Taylor)
Top scorer	Matty Taylor (28)
Most assists	Chris Lines (8)

Note: Games which are level after extra-time and are decided by a penalty shoot-out are listed as draws. Bristol Rovers score listed first where applicable.

=== Overall ===
Competition	Started round	Current position / round	Final position / round	First match	Last match
League Two	—	—	3rd	8 August 2015	7 May 2016
FA Cup	1st round	—	1st round	8 November 2015	
League Cup	1st round	—	1st round	11 August 2015	
League Trophy	2nd round	—	Quarter-finals	6 October 2015	11 November 2015

Updated to match played 7 May 2016
Source: Competitions

=== League Two ===
==== League table ====
Pos	Team	Pld	W	D	L	GF	GA	GD	Pts	Promotion, qualification or relegation
1	Northampton Town (C, P)	46	29	12	5	82	46	+36	99	Promotion to EFL League One
2	Oxford United (P)	46	24	14	8	84	41	+43	86	Promotion to EFL League One
3	Bristol Rovers (P)	46	26	7	13	77	46	+31	85	Promotion to EFL League One
4	Accrington Stanley	46	24	13	9	74	48	+26	85	Qualification for League Two play-offs (Note: Four teams play for one spot and promotion to Football League One.)
5	Plymouth Argyle	46	24	9	13	72	46	+26	81	Qualification for League Two play-offs

Updated to match(es) played on 7 May 2016. Source: BBC Sport
Rules for classification: 1) Points; 2) Goal difference; 3) Number of goals scored
(C) Champions; (P) Promoted

==== Results summary ====
Overall								Home						Away					
Pld	W	D	L	GF	GA	GD	Pts	W	D	L	GF	GA	GD	W	D	L	GF	GA	GD
46	26	7	13	77	46	+31	85	15	2	6	41	21	+20	11	5	7	36	25	+11

Last updated: 7 May 2016.

=== Results by round ===
Round	1	2	3	4	5	6	7	8	9	10	11	12	13	14	15	16	17	18	19	20	21	22	23	24	25	26	27	28	29	30	31	32	33	34	35	36	37	38	39	40	41	42	43	44	45	46
Ground	H	A	A	H	A	H	H	A	H	A	A	A	H	H	A	H	A	H	A	H	H	A	A	H	H	A	A	H	A	A	H	A	H	A	H	H	A	H	A	H	A	H	A	H	A	H
Result	L	W	W	W	L	L	L	D	L	W	W	W	D	L	W	W	L	L	D	W	W	W	D	W	W	L	W	D	L	L	W	L	W	W	W	W	W	W	L	W	D	W	D	W	W	W
Position	17	10	8	4	7	10	15	15	17	14	12	11	11	13	9	8	12	13	12	10	8	7	5	6	5	5	4	4	4	8	6	10	6	6	5	4	3	3	5	3	4	3	5	4	4	3

Updated to match(es) played on 7 May 2016. Source:
A = Away; H = Home; W = Win; D = Draw; L = Loss

=== Scores overview ===
Bristol Rovers score given first.

Opposition	Home score	Away score	Double	Points	Agg.
Accrington Stanley	0–1	0 – 1	No	0	0–2
AFC Wimbledon	3–1	0 – 0	No	4	3–1
Barnet	3–1	0 – 1	No	3	3–2
Cambridge United	3–0	2 – 1	Yes	6	5–1
Carlisle United	2–0	2 – 3	No	3	4–3
Crawley Town	3–0	1 – 2	No	3	4–2
Dagenham & Redbridge	2–1	3 – 0	Yes	6	5–1
Exeter City	3–1	1 – 1	No	4	4–2
Hartlepool United	4–1	3 – 0	Yes	6	7–1
Leyton Orient	2–1	0 – 1	No	3	2–2
Luton Town	2–0	1 – 0	Yes	6	3–0
Mansfield Town	1–0	2 – 1	Yes	6	3–1
Morecambe	2–1	4 – 3	Yes	6	6–4
Newport County	1–4	4 – 1	No	3	5–5
Northampton Town	0–1	2 – 2	No	1	2–3
Notts County	0–0	2 – 0	No	4	2–0
Oxford United	0–1	2 – 1	No	3	2–2
Plymouth Argyle	1–1	1 – 1	No	2	2–2
Portsmouth	1–2	1 – 3	No	0	2–5
Stevenage	1–2	0 – 0	No	1	1–2
Wycombe Wanderers	3–0	0 – 1	No	3	3–1
Yeovil Town	2–1	1 – 0	Yes	6	3–1
York City	2–1	4 – 1	Yes	6	6–2

== Matches ==
Won Drawn Lost Postponed

=== Pre-season friendlies ===
On 26 May 2015, Rovers announced their initial pre-season fixtures against Salisbury, Cirencester Town, Arsenal U21s and Reading in addition to a testimonial fixture against West Bromwich Albion for long serving, retiring physiotherapist and former player Phil Kite. Further friendlies against Cheltenham Town, Mangotsfield United and Sutton United were later added, all away from home.

11 July 2015	Salisbury	1–4	Bristol Rovers	Raymond McEnhill Stadium
14:00 BST	Coulson 89'	Report	Lucas 12', 57'; Blissett 52', 90'	Attendance: 1,068 (386); Referee: Brendan Malone

12 July 2015	Sutton United	1–2	Bristol Rovers	Gander Green Lane
13:00 BST	Collins 83'	Report	Lines 15'; Broom 80'	Attendance: 658

14 July 2015	Cirencester Town	0–7	Bristol Rovers	Corinium Stadium
19:45 BST		Report	Bodin 7', 16', 41'; Lucas 33' (pen.), 59', 81' (pen.); Broom 61'	Attendance: 201; Referee: Adam Matthews

15 July 2015	Mangotsfield United	0–2	Bristol Rovers	Cossham Street
19:45 BST		Report	Blissett 31', 60'	Referee: Mark Dadds

18 July 2015	Bristol Rovers	0–1	Arsenal U21s	Memorial Stadium
15:00 BST		Report	Mavididi 5'	Attendance: 2,093 (150); Referee: Kevin Johnson

21 July 2015	Bristol Rovers	0–2	Reading	Memorial Stadium
19:45 BST		Report	Samuel 39'; Blackman 65'	Attendance: 1,880 (264)

25 July 2015	Cheltenham Town	2–1	Bristol Rovers	Whaddon Road
15:00 BST	Waters 7', 40'	Report	Lockyer 10'	Attendance: 1,100; Referee: Mark Pottage

31 July 2015	Bristol Rovers	0–4	West Bromwich Albion	Memorial Stadium
19:30 BST		Report	Lambert 23', 47'; Gardner 34'; Anichebe 78'	Attendance: 4,068 (308); Referee: Lee Probert

=== League Two ===
On 17 June 2015, the Football League revealed the fixtures for the forthcoming season. Rovers' first fixture was against Northampton Town at the Memorial Stadium followed, a week later by a trip to Huish Park to face Yeovil Town. The traditional Boxing Day fixture saw Rovers' travel to AFC Wimbledon while the final game of the season saw Dagenham & Redbridge visit the Mem.

==== August ====
8 August 2015 1	Bristol Rovers	0–1	Northampton Town	Memorial Stadium
15:00 BST	Sinclair (yellow card) 6'	Report	Adams (yellow card) 25'; O'Toole 49'	Attendance: 8,712 (574); Referee: Mark Heywood

15 August 2015 2	Yeovil Town	0–1	Bristol Rovers	Huish Park
15:00 BST	Dolan (yellow card) 17' (yellow-red card) 65'	Report	Harrison 88'	Attendance: 5,895 (2,038); Referee: Brendan Malone

18 August 2015 3	Luton Town	0–1	Bristol Rovers	Kenilworth Road
19:45 BST	Wilkinson (yellow card) 16'; McCourt (yellow card) 55'	Report	Harrison (yellow card) 76'; Sinclair 90+4'; Leadbitter (yellow card) 90+5'	Attendance: 8,061 (553); Referee: Trevor Kettle

22 August 2015 4	Bristol Rovers	3–1	Barnet	Memorial Stadium
15:00 BST	Brown 2', (yellow card) 82'; Easter 77'; Lockyer (yellow card) 83'; Taylor 87'	Report	Batt (yellow card) 66'; Weston 85'	Attendance: 7,107 (199); Referee: Ross Joyce

29 August 2015 5	Leyton Orient	2–0	Bristol Rovers	Brisbane Road
15:00 BST	Pritchard (yellow card) 12'; James 23', (yellow card) 28'; Simpson 45+2'	Report		Attendance: 5,777 (1,023); Referee: Darren Drysdale

==== September ====
6 September 2015 6	Bristol Rovers	0–1	Oxford United	Memorial Stadium
12:15 BST	~~O. Clarke (red card) 17'~~	Report	Dunkley (yellow card) 40'; Sercombe (yellow card) 45+2' (yellow-red card) 59'; Hylton (yellow card) 47'; Taylor (yellow card) 54'; Roofe 62'	Attendance: 7,038 (633); Referee: James Linington

12 September 2015 7	Bristol Rovers	0–1	Accrington Stanley	Memorial Stadium
15:00 BST	Parkes (yellow card) 30'	Report	Kee 68'; Procter (yellow card) 85'; Buxton (yellow card) 89'	Attendance: 6,351 (48); Referee: Kevin Johnson

19 September 2015 8	Plymouth Argyle	1–1	Bristol Rovers	Home Park
15:00 BST	McHugh (yellow card) 49'; Sawyer (yellow card) 60'; Nelson (yellow card) 76'; Jervis 85'; McCormick (yellow card) 90+1'; Cox (yellow card) 90+4'	Report	Harrison (yellow card) 76', (goal) 90+1' (pen.)	Attendance: 10,633 (1,587); Referee: Chris Sarginson

26 September 2015 9	Bristol Rovers	1–2	Portsmouth	Memorial Stadium
15:00 BST	Lines (yellow card) 26'; Easter 48'; Gosling (yellow card) 62'; Lockyer (yellow card) 90+2'	Report	Stockley (yellow card) 14', (goal) 71'; Evans 29'; Chaplin (yellow card) 60'	Attendance: 8,555 (1,188); Referee: Jeremy Simpson

29 September 2015 10	Hartlepool United	0–3	Bristol Rovers	Victoria Park
19:45 BST	Harrison (yellow card) 23'; Boyce (yellow card) 82'; Halliday (yellow card) 88'	Report	Taylor 32'; McCrystal (yellow card) 45'; Bodin 64'; Easter 78'; Harrison (yellow card) 82'	Attendance: 3,788 (190); Referee: Darren Handley

==== October ====
3 October 2015 11	Morecambe	3–4	Bristol Rovers	Globe Arena
15:00 BST	Miller 43'; Barkhuizen 60'; Mullin 87' (pen.); Fleming (yellow card) 90+6'	Report	Mansell 28'; Bodin 47'; Taylor 58'; Harrison 80' (pen.); Nicholls (yellow card) 90+2'	Attendance: 1,712 (386); Referee: Andrew Madley

10 October 2015	Bristol Rovers	P–P	Wycombe Wanderers	Memorial Stadium
15:00 BST		Postponed due to international call-ups

17 October 2015 12	Mansfield Town	1–2	Bristol Rovers	Field Mill
15:00 BST	Benning (yellow card) 44'; Jensen (yellow card) 59'; Pearce (red card) 60'; Hunt (yellow card) 62' (yellow-red card) 77'; Tafazolli 81'	Report	Easter 15', ~~(red card) 45+3'~~; Lines (yellow card) 35'; Harrison (yellow card) 63'; Taylor 90+8'	Attendance: 4,196 (847); Referee: Mark Haywood

20 October 2015 13	Bristol Rovers	0–0	Notts County	Memorial Stadium
19:45 BST		Report	Aborah (yellow card) 50'; Amevor (yellow card) 86'	Attendance: 6,743 (148); Referee: Steve Martin

24 October 2015 14	Bristol Rovers	1–4	Newport County	Memorial Stadium
15:00 BST	Bodin 15'	Report	Parkes 13' (o.g.); Ansah 52', 57'; O'Sullivan 75'; Elito (yellow card) 82'	Attendance: 7,442 (518); Referee: Nick Kinseley

30 October 2015 15	Cambridge United	1–2	Bristol Rovers	Abbey Stadium
19:45 GMT	Corr 33'	Report	Harrison 66'; J. Clarke (yellow card) 80'; Taylor 82'	Attendance: 5,115 (562); Referee: Brendan Malone

==== November ====
14 November 2015 16	Bristol Rovers	2–0	Carlisle United	Memorial Stadium
15:00 GMT	Sinclair (yellow card) 9'; Brown (yellow card) 52'; McChrystal (yellow card) 55'; Taylor 66', 87'	Report		Attendance: 6,423 (353); Referee: Mark Brown

21 November 2015 17	Crawley Town	2–1	Bristol Rovers	Broadfield Stadium
15:00 GMT	Murphy 9', 10'; Smith (yellow card) 17'; Yorwerth (yellow card) 62'	Report	Brown (yellow card) 43'; Lockyer (yellow card) 82'; Taylor 87' (pen.)	Attendance: 2,612 (836); Referee: Trevor Kettle

24 November 2015 18	Bristol Rovers	1–2	Stevenage	Memorial Stadium
19:45 GMT	Taylor 33'	Report	Kennedy 4'; Whelpdale 60'; Lee (yellow card) 80'; Franks (yellow card) 90+2'	Attendance: 5,819 (101); Referee: Graham Salisbury

28 November 2015 19	Exeter City	1–1	Bristol Rovers	St James Park
15:00 GMT	Moore-Taylor (yellow card) 64'; Reid 90+4'	Report	Taylor (yellow card) 64'; O. Clarke (yellow card) 79'; Sinclair 83'	Attendance: 5,548 (1,559); Referee: Phil Gibbs

==== December ====
1 December 2015 20	Bristol Rovers	3–0	Wycombe Wanderers	Memorial Stadium
19:45 GMT	Taylor 60', 62', 72'	Report	Amadi-Holloway (yellow card) 77'	Attendance: 6,136 (255); Referee: Brendan Malone

12 December 2015 21	Bristol Rovers	2–1	York City	Memorial Stadium
15:00 GMT	Taylor (yellow card) 45+1', (goal) 90+1'; Easter 71'	Report	Ilesanmi (yellow card) 17'; Oliver 41'; Flinders (yellow card) 66'; O'Connor (yellow card) 73'	Attendance: 6,916 (170); Referee: Ben Toner

19 December 2015 22	Dagenham & Redbridge	0–3	Bristol Rovers	Victoria Road
15:00 GMT	Dikamona (yellow card) 65'	Report	Brown 33'; Gaffney (yellow card) 82', (goal) 83'; Bodin 90+5'	Attendance: 1,820 (603); Referee: Charles Breakspear

26 December 2015 23	AFC Wimbledon	0–0	Bristol Rovers	Kingsmeadow
15:00 GMT	Robinson (red card) 4'; Reeves (yellow card) 60'; Taylor (yellow card) 76'	Report	Leadbitter (yellow card) 83'	Attendance: 4,668 (806); Referee: Keith Hill

28 December 2015 24	Bristol Rovers	2–1	Leyton Orient	Memorial Stadium
15:00 GMT	Gaffney 31', 53'; Sinclair (yellow card) 63'; Parkes (yellow card) 65'; Leadbitter (yellow card) 89'	Report	Simpson 45+1'; McAnuff (yellow card) 63'	Attendance: 9,836 (487); Referee: Kevin Johnson

==== January ====
2 January 2016 25	Bristol Rovers	2–0	Luton Town	Memorial Stadium
15:00 GMT	Gaffney 60', 72'; Taylor (yellow card) 66'	Report	Hall (yellow card) 10'; Cuthbert (yellow card) 15'; Howells (yellow card) 43'; McCourt (yellow card) 84'	Attendance: 9,131 (707); Referee: Lee Swabey

9 January 2016 26	Barnet	1–0	Bristol Rovers	The Hive Stadium
15:00 GMT	Hoyte 5'; Yiadom (red card) 59'	Report	Lockyer (yellow card) 60'	Attendance: 2,770 (1,262); Referee: Michael Bull

17 January 2016 27	Oxford United	1–2	Bristol Rovers	Kassam Stadium
15:00 GMT	Roofe 46'; Maguire (yellow card) 74'; Slocombe (yellow card) 88'	Report	Taylor 52'; J. Clarke (yellow card) 70'; Harrison 88' (pen.)	Attendance: 9,492 (2,359); Referee: Nick Kinseley

23 January 2016 28	Bristol Rovers	1–1	Plymouth Argyle	Memorial Stadium
15:00 GMT	Parkes (yellow card) 10'; Bodin 79'	Report	Simpson 88'; Mellor (yellow card) 90+3'	Attendance: 10,190 (1,285); Referee: Oliver Langford

30 January 2016 29	Accrington Stanley	1–0	Bristol Rovers	Crown Ground
15:00 GMT	McConville 69'	Report		Attendance: 2,027 (543); Referee: Mark Haywood

==== February ====
6 February 2016	Bristol Rovers	P–P	AFC Wimbledon	Memorial Stadium
15:00 GMT		Postponed due to a waterlogged pitch		Referee: Ben Toner

13 February 2016 30	Portsmouth	3–1	Bristol Rovers	Fratton Park
15:00 GMT	Evans 19'; Smith 45+3'; McNulty 77'	Report	Easter (yellow card) 25'; Brown (yellow card) 39', (goal) 90+1'; Montaño (yellow card) 85'; Lockyer (yellow card) 90+3'	Attendance: 17,808 (2,863); Referee: Trevor Kettle

20 February 2016 31	Bristol Rovers	2–1	Morecambe	Memorial Stadium
15:00 GMT	Brown (yellow card) 58'; Gaffney 68'; Bodin 78'	Report	Devitt 12' (pen.); Fleming (red card) 80'	Attendance: 7,400 (92); Referee: Darren England

27 February 2016 32	Wycombe Wanderers	1–0	Bristol Rovers	Adams Park
15:00 GMT	O'Nein 85'	Report	Lawrence (yellow card) 52'; Gaffney (yellow card) 70'; J. Clarke (yellow card) 84'	Attendance: 4,759 (1,629); Referee: Chris Sarginson

==== March ====
1 March 2016 33	Bristol Rovers	4–1	Hartlepool United	Memorial Stadium
19:45 GMT	Taylor 10', 38', 56'; Gaffney 31'; McChrystal (yellow card) 72'	Report	Featherstone (yellow card) 27'; Paynter 52'; Carroll (yellow card) 53'; Walker (yellow card) 82'	Attendance: 6,634 (87); Referee: Lee Swabey

5 March 2016 34	Notts County	0–2	Bristol Rovers	Meadow Lane
15:00 GMT	Audel (yellow card) 40'	Report	Montaño 43'; Brown 50'	Attendance: 5,052 (1,108); Referee: Tim Robinson

8 March 2016 35	Bristol Rovers	3–1	AFC Wimbledon	Memorial Stadium
19:45 GMT	Easter 28'; O. Clarke 38'; Taylor 78'	Report	Meades 52', (yellow card) 59'; Reeves (yellow card) 74'; Akinfenwa (red card) 90+1'	Attendance: 7,778 (303); Referee: Ben Toner

12 March 2016 36	Bristol Rovers	1–0	Mansfield Town	Memorial Stadium
15:00 GMT	Taylor 61'; Mansell (yellow card) 77'; Brown (yellow card) 90+2'; Harrison (yellow card) 90+3'; McBurnie (yellow card) 90+3'	Report	Lambe (yellow card) 40'; Tafazolli (yellow card) 59'; Benning (yellow card) 66'; Shearer (yellow card) 90+3'	Attendance: 7,847 (241); Referee: Dean Whitestone

19 March 2016 37	Newport County	1–4	Bristol Rovers	Rodney Parade
12:30 GMT	Rodman 2'; Byrne (yellow card) 73'; Jones (yellow card) 87'	Report	Clarke 15'; Montaño 55'; Taylor 61'; Harrison 85', (yellow card) 87'	Attendance: 3,663 (1,042); Referee: Graham Salisbury

24 March 2016 38	Bristol Rovers	3–0	Cambridge United	Memorial Stadium
15:00 GMT	Bodin 9', 18'; Taylor 73'	Report	Berry (yellow card) 46'; Spencer (yellow card) 50'	Attendance: 10,262; Referee: Stephen Martin

28 March 2016 39	Carlisle United	3–2	Bristol Rovers	Brunton Park
15:00 BST	Stacey 11'; Wyke 49'; Kennedy 85'; Ibehre (yellow card) 90'; Ellis (yellow card) 90'	Report	Bodin 27'; Parkes (yellow card) 51'; Taylor 57'; Lines (yellow card) 72'	Attendance: 4,718 (651); Referee: Darren England

==== April ====
2 April 2016 40	Bristol Rovers	3–0	Crawley Town	Memorial Stadium
15:00 BST	Lines (yellow card) 13'; Taylor 53', 79'; Lawrence 75'	Report	Yorwerth (yellow card) 40'; Della-Verde (yellow card) 64'; Fenelon (yellow card) 68'; Sutherland (yellow card) 72'	Attendance: 8,250 (99); Referee: Fred Graham

9 April 2016 41	Northampton Town	2–2	Bristol Rovers	Sixfields Stadium
15:00 BST	Adams 23', (yellow card) 37'; Hoskins 49'; Marquis (yellow card) 81'	Report	Taylor 76'; Leadbitter (yellow card) 79'; Harrison 88'	Attendance: 7,579 (925); Referee: Tony Harrington

16 April 2016 42	Bristol Rovers	2–1	Yeovil Town	Memorial Stadium
15:00 BST	Gaffney 42'; Taylor 77'; McBurnie (yellow card) 90+2'	Report	Lita 73', (yellow card) 74'; Laird (yellow card) 90+1'	Attendance: 10,264 (926); Referee: Paul Tierney

19 April 2016 43	Stevenage	0–0	Bristol Rovers	Broadhall Way
19:45 BST	Tonge (yellow card) 59'; Franks (yellow card) 78'; Parrett (yellow card) 90'	Report	Clarke (yellow card) 57'	Attendance: 3,836 (1,327); Referee: Andrew Madley

23 April 2016 44	Bristol Rovers	3–1	Exeter City	Memorial Stadium
15:00 BST	Bodin 13'; Brown 45+4', (yellow card) 78'; Taylor 69'; Lockyer (yellow card) 72'	Report	Brown (yellow card) 45+2'; Taylor 48'; Stockley (yellow card) 73'	Attendance: 10,254 (893); Referee: Nigel Miller

30 April 2016 45	York City	1–4	Bristol Rovers	Bootham Crescent
15:00 BST	Berrett (yellow card) 24'; Penn (yellow card) 39'; Galbraith (yellow card) 40'; McEvoy 81'	Report	Bodin 19', 71'; Easter 80'; Mansell 88'	Attendance: 4,525 (2,000); Referee: Darren Handley

==== May ====
7 May 2016 46	Bristol Rovers	2–1	Dagenham & Redbridge	Memorial Stadium
15:00 BST	Bodin 15'; Brown 90+2', (yellow card) 90+3'	Report	Cash 12'	Attendance: 11,130 (291); Referee: Stuart Attwell

=== FA Cup ===
On 26 October 2015, the first round draw was made. Rovers were drawn at home to Southern League Premier side Chesham United whom they lost to 1–0.

8 November 2015 First round	Bristol Rovers	0–1	Chesham United	Memorial Stadium
14:00 GMT	Mansell (yellow card) 25'; Lockyer (yellow card) 28'	Report	Blake (yellow card) 42', (goal) 77'; Little (yellow card) 70'	Attendance: 5,181 (577); Referee: Andy Davies

=== Football League Cup ===
On 16 June 2015, the first round draw was made, Rovers were drawn at home against Championship side Birmingham City, who they lost to 2–1.

11 August 2015 First round	Bristol Rovers	1–2	Birmingham City	Memorial Stadium
19:45 BST	Harrison 65'	Report	Davis (yellow card) 45'; Maghoma 57'; Shinnie 68'; Novak (yellow card) 90+6'	Attendance: 5,650 (1,150); Referee: Andy Davies

=== Football League Trophy ===
On 3 August 2015, Rovers were awarded a bye in the first round. On 5 September 2015, Rovers were drawn at home against fellow League Two side Wycombe Wanderers, whom they defeated 2–0. On 10 October 2015, Rovers were drawn away to League One side Southend United in the quarter-final and were defeated 1–0.

6 October 2015 Second round	Bristol Rovers	2–0	Wycombe Wanderers	Memorial Stadium
19:45 BST	Taylor 4'; Easter 11'	Report		Attendance: 3,243 (123); Referee: Oliver Langford

11 November 2015 Quarter-final	Southend United	1–0	Bristol Rovers	Roots Hall
19:45 GMT	White 11'; Barrett (yellow card) 31'; Atkinson (yellow card) 45'; Payne (yellow card) 89'; Pigott (yellow card) 90+3'	Report	J. Clarke (yellow card) 62'; McChrystal (yellow card) 66'	Attendance: 3,495 (181); Referee: Andy Woolmer

=== Gloucestershire Senior Cup ===
Rovers' entered in the first round of the Gloucestershire Senior Cup where they faced holders Cirencester Town, whom they defeated 5–2. They then met Mangotsfield United in the quarter-final, winning 4–1. Their semi-final was against Forest Green Rovers whom they lost to 4–3. Rovers generally fielded a team of non-regular first-team and youth squad players in the competition.

8 September 2015 First round	Cirencester Town	2–5	Bristol Rovers	Corinium Stadium
19:30 BST	Knight 17'; Parsons 68'	Report	Montaño 9', 54'; Bodin 12', 58'; Davies 78'	Attendance: 30; Referee: Alexander Emery

19 January 2016 Quarter-final	Mangotsfield United	1–4	Bristol Rovers	Cossham Street
19:45 GMT	Bament 79'	Report	Broom 3', 26' (pen.); Mehew 36'; Malpas 41'	Referee: Robert Cockle

12 April 2016 Semi-final	Bristol Rovers	3–4	Forest Green Rovers	Memorial Stadium
19:00 BST	Williams 27', 40'; Moore	Report	Davies 52', 64'; Mehew 86'	Referee: Simon Shaw

== See also ==
- 2015–16 in English football
- 2015–16 Football League Two
- List of Bristol Rovers F.C. seasons
