= 2015 Conference Premier play-off final =

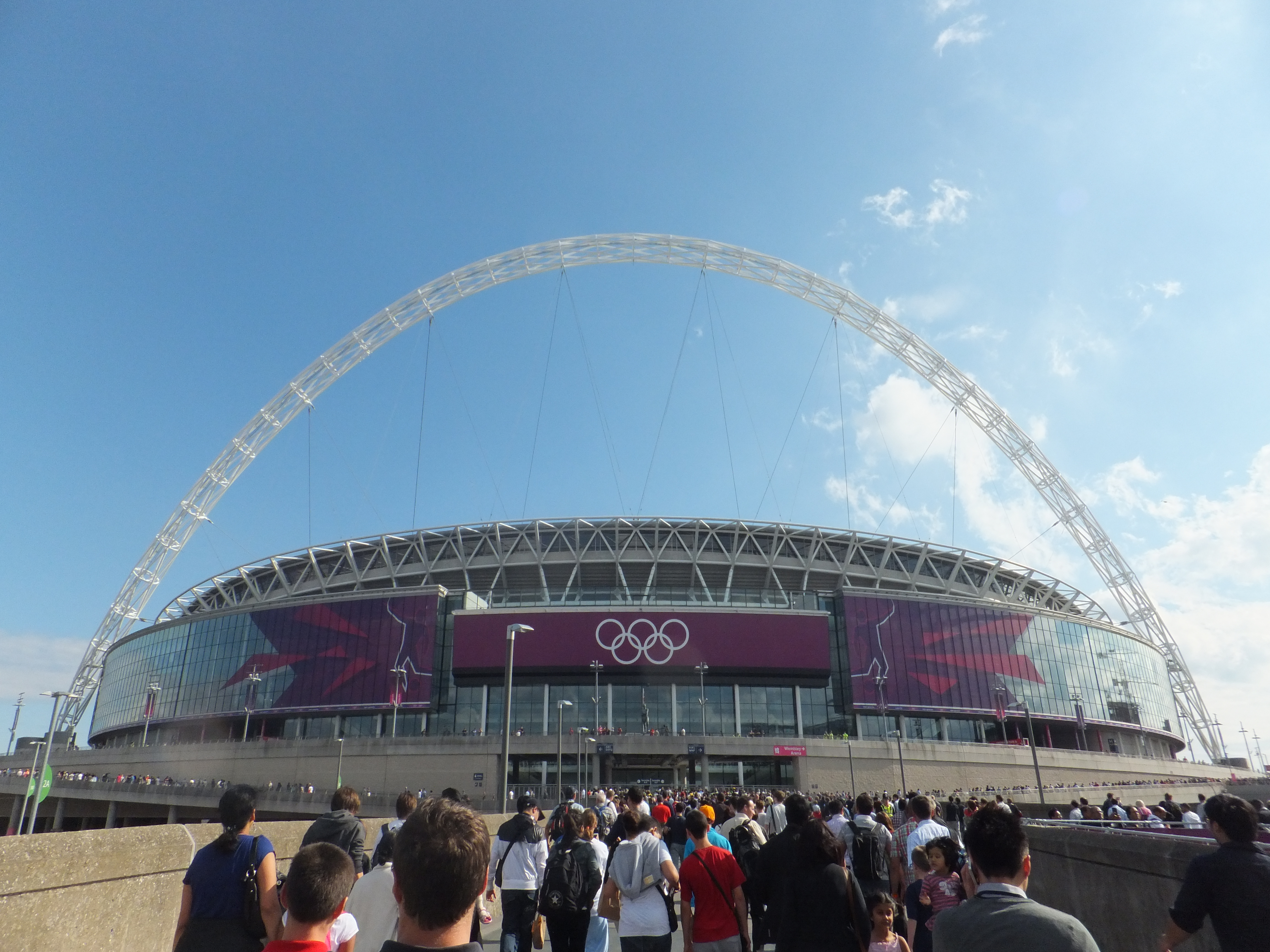
- Wembley Stadium, venue for the match
- Event: 2014–15 Football Conference
Bristol Rovers	Grimsby Town
1	1
- Bristol Rovers won 5–3 on penalties
- Date: 17 May 2015
- Venue: Wembley Stadium, London
- Referee: Ross Joyce
- Attendance: 47,029

The 2015 Conference Premier play-off final, known as the 2015 Vanarama Conference Promotion Final for sponsorship reasons, was a football match between Bristol Rovers and Grimsby Town played on 17 May 2015 at Wembley Stadium in London. It was the thirteenth Conference Premier play-off final, the eighth to be played at Wembley and the first to feature either side.

The two participants finished the regular season in 2nd and 3rd respectively to qualify for the play-offs. Bristol Rovers overcame local rivals Forest Green Rovers 3–0 over two legs while Grimsby Town disposed of Eastleigh 5–1.

Bristol Rovers won the match 5–3 on penalties following a 1–1 draw after extra time. Rovers therefore became the first club since Carlisle United in 2005 to secure an immediate return to the Football League, after their relegation on the last day of the previous season. For Grimsby Town, it was the third successive season that they had failed to win promotion via the play-offs and were condemned to a sixth straight season in the fifth tier. The attendance of 47,029 was a record for a Conference Premier match, beating the previous best of 42,669 when Oxford United defeated York City to win promotion at the same venue in 2010.

== Route to the final ==
Pos	Team	Pld	W	D	L	GF	GA	GD	Pts
2	Bristol Rovers	46	25	16	5	73	34	+39	91
3	Grimsby Town	46	25	11	10	74	40	+34	86
4	Eastleigh	46	24	10	12	87	61	+26	82
5	Forest Green Rovers	46	22	16	8	80	54	+26	79 (Note: Forest Green Rovers were deducted three points for fielding an ineligible player in their win over Southport on 9 August 2014.)

=== Semi-finals ===
First leg

29 April 2015	Forest Green Rovers	0 – 1	Bristol Rovers	The New Lawn, Nailsworth
19:45		Report	Taylor 17'; Harrison (yellow card) 65' (yellow-red card) 77'	Attendance: 3,336; Referee: Lee Swabey

30 April 2015	Eastleigh	1 – 2	Grimsby Town	Ten Acres, Eastleigh
19:45	Odubade 62'	Report	Arnold 3', 72'	Attendance: 3,251; Referee: Simon Bennett

Second leg

3 May 2015	Bristol Rovers	2 – 0 (3 – 0 agg.)	Forest Green Rovers	Memorial Stadium, Bristol
12:45	Lines 24'; Taylor 88'	Report		Attendance: 10,563; Referee: Darren England

3 May 2015	Grimsby Town	3 – 0 (5 – 1 agg.)	Eastleigh	Blundell Park, Cleethorpes
15:30	Palmer 35', 71'; John-Lewis 44'	Report		Attendance: 6,286; Referee: Ben Toner

== Match ==
=== Summary ===
Grimsby Town got off to the perfect start when a purposeful run from Nathan Arnold set up Lenell John-Lewis to shoot from inside the penalty area. His shot was saved by Bristol Rovers goalkeeper Will Puddy but it deflected off John-Lewis' face into the goal, giving the Mariners the lead after just 1:38. Grimsby kept up the pressure and were unfortunate not to be playing against ten men as Puddy handled Ollie Palmer's shot outside the area. However, referee Ross Joyce deemed the offence only worthy of a yellow card. Just over 10 minutes later and Rovers were level after Grimsby failed to deal with a Jake Gosling corner, leaving Ellis Harrison to drive the ball past James McKeown.

The second half proved a much less open affair as players tired, defenders came out on top and errors were few and far between. Extra time was much the same, as chances for Chris Lines for Rovers and John-Lewis for Grimsby came to nothing. In the last minute of the extra time, Rovers manager Darrell Clarke switched Puddy for substitute keeper Steve Mildenhall for the inevitable penalty shoot-out, in a move reminiscent of that by Dutch coach Louis van Gaal at the previous year's World Cup. Clarke later stated that he felt Mildenhall would have "a better chance with his bigger frame."

The first five penalties of the shoot-out were successfully converted before Jon-Paul Pittman blazed his over the bar in front of the Grimsby fans. The following two were also successful, leaving veteran Lee Mansell with the deciding spot kick, which he powered in to McKeown's left.

=== Details ===
17 May 2015
14:00 BST

Bristol Rovers	1–1 (a.e.t.)	Grimsby Town
Harrison 29'	Report	John-Lewis 2'
Penalties
Lines (penalty scored); Taylor (penalty scored); Brown (penalty scored); Balanta (penalty scored); Mansell (penalty scored)	5–3	Disley (penalty scored); John-Lewis (penalty scored); Pittman (penalty missed); Clay (penalty scored)

Wembley Stadium, London
Attendance: 47,029
Referee: Ross Joyce

Bristol Rovers	Grimsby Town

GK	25	Will Puddy	(yellow card) 18'	(substituted off) 120+1'
RB	4	Tom Lockyer
CB	5	Mark McChrystal (c)
CB	6	Tom Parkes
LB	3	Lee Brown
RM	11	Jake Gosling		(substituted off) 75'
CM	14	Chris Lines
CM	7	Lee Mansell
LM	23	Andy Monkhouse
ST	10	Matty Taylor	(yellow card) 35'
ST	17	Ellis Harrison		(substituted off) 80'
Substitutes:
GK	1	Steve Mildenhall		(substituted in) 120+1'
DF	2	Daniel Leadbitter
MF	8	Ollie Clarke
MF	29	Ángelo Balanta		(substituted in) 75'
FW	27	Nathan Blissett		(substituted in) 80'
Manager:
Darrell Clarke

GK	1	James McKeown
RB	6	Carl Magnay	(yellow card) 41'
CB	22	Aristote Nsiala
CB	5	Shaun Pearson
LB	35	Gregor Robertson		(substituted off) 74'
RM	7	Jack Mackreth
CM	8	Craig Disley (c)
CM	4	Scott Brown	(yellow card) 87'	(substituted off) 99'
LM	20	Nathan Arnold
ST	14	Lenell John-Lewis
ST	33	Ollie Palmer		(substituted off) 70'
Substitutes:
DF	19	Daniel Parslow		(substituted in) 74'
MF	16	Craig Clay		(substituted in) 99'
MF	34	Christian Jolley
FW	10	Ross Hannah
FW	18	Jon-Paul Pittman		(substituted in) 70'
Manager:
Paul Hurst

Match officials:

- Assistant referees:
  - Paul Johnson
  - Joe Johnson
- Fourth official: Martin Coy

Match rules:

- 90 minutes.
- 30 minutes of extra time if necessary.
- Penalty shoot-out if scores still level.
- Five named substitutes.
- Maximum of three substitutions.
