= Jake Gosling (footballer) =

British footballer (born 1993)

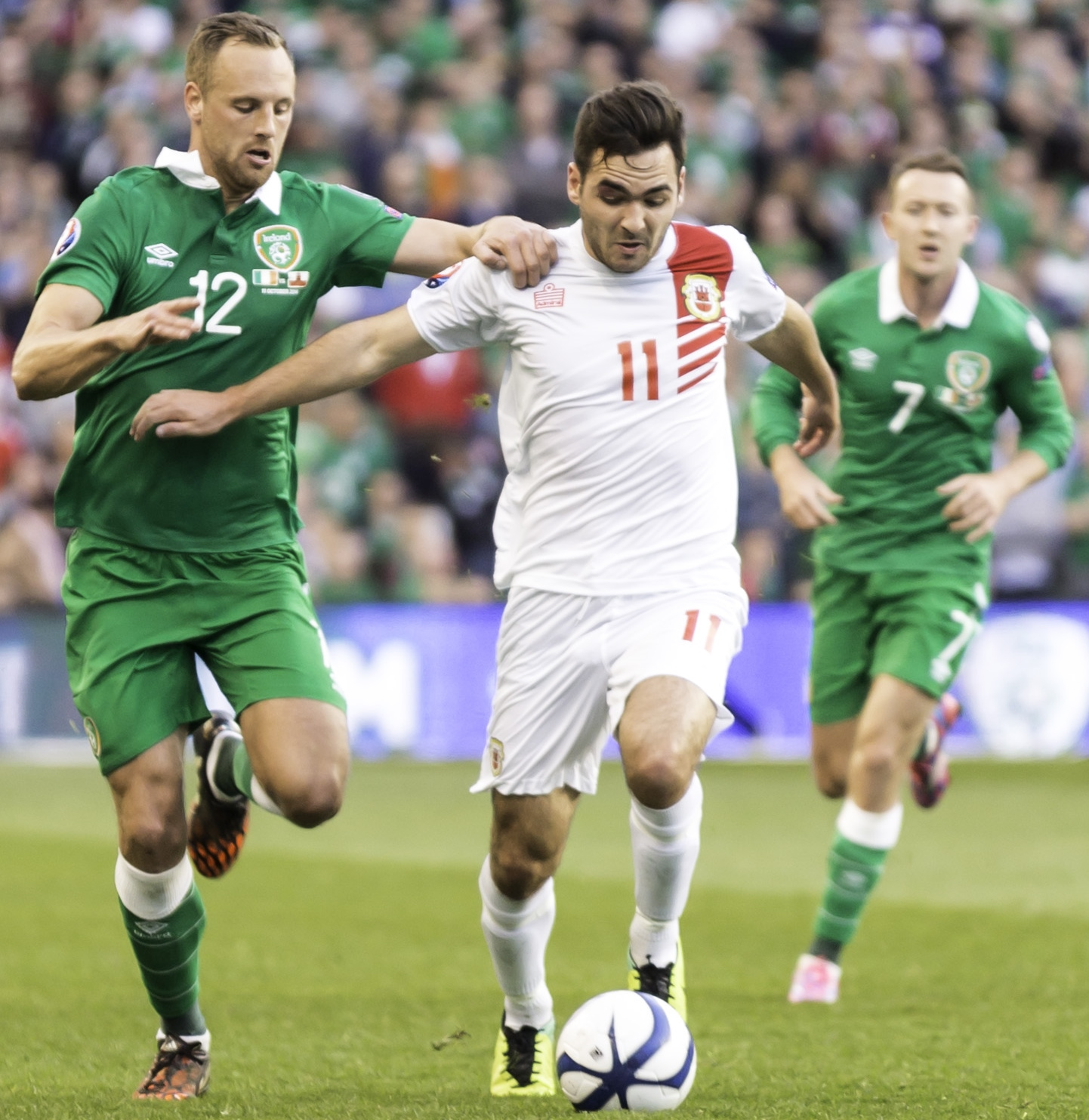
- Gosling playing for Gibraltar in 2014

Personal information
- Date of birth: 11 August 1993 (age 33)
- Place of birth: Oxford, England
- Height: 1.76 m (5 ft 9 in)
- Position: Winger

Team information
- Current team: Beaconsfield Town

Youth career
- Godolphin Atlantic
- 2003–2009: Plymouth Argyle
- 2010–2011: Exeter City

Senior career*
Years	Team	Apps	(Gls)
2011–2014	Exeter City	15	(1)
2012–2013	→ Dorchester Town (loan)	12	(0)
2014	→ Gloucester City (loan)	12	(3)
2014–2017	Bristol Rovers	44	(3)
2016	→ Newport County (loan)	6	(0)
2016	→ Cambridge United (loan)	4	(0)
2017	→ Forest Green Rovers (loan)	7	(0)
2017–2018	Torquay United	14	(0)
2019–2021	Sporting Khalsa	26	(15)
2021–2023	Bristol Manor Farm	48	(9)
2023	Rushall Olympic	13	(0)
2023	Thame United	1	(0)
2023–	Beaconsfield Town	15	(0)

International career
2014–2018	Gibraltar	12	(2)
- * Club domestic league appearances and goals as of 27 April 2024

Jake Gosling (born 11 August 1993) is a professional footballer who plays for Beaconsfield Town, where he plays as a winger.

Born and raised in England, he plays internationally for Gibraltar, where his father was born. With two goals, until 2019, he was Gibraltar's joint all-time leading scorer since joining UEFA along with Lee Casciaro and Liam Walker.

== Club career ==
=== Early career and Exeter City ===
Born in Oxford, Gosling signed for Swindon Town Centre of Excellence as a ten-year-old. A year later he signed for Plymouth Argyle Centre of Excellence after he moved with his family to Newquay in Cornwall. He was released by Argyle at the age of 16 whereupon he enrolled at Hartpury College. He graduated through the Exeter City youth team to sign professional terms under Paul Tisdale in April 2012.

He scored a "stunning goal" against Dorchester Town in pre-season, and joined Conference South side Dorchester on loan in September; the initial one-month loan deal was later extended until January. During this loan spell he scored the goal that knocked Exeter's rivals Plymouth Argyle out of the FA Cup on 4 November.

He made his debut for Exeter on 12 January 2013, as a late substitute for Steve Tully in a 3–0 win over Southend United at St James Park. He scored his first goal for the club to complete a 3–0 home win over Northampton Town in League Two on 2 March. After the match, Gosling said he hoped to become a first team regular at the club.

On 13 March 2014, Gosling joined Conference North side Gloucester City on loan until the end of the season. He made his debut three days later in a 3–3 draw against Gainsborough Trinity. Gosling made twelve appearances and scored three times: against Brackley Town, Harrogate Town and A.F.C. Telford United.

On 17 May 2014, Gosling announced that he was leaving Exeter, though he was offered a new contract by the club.

=== Bristol Rovers ===
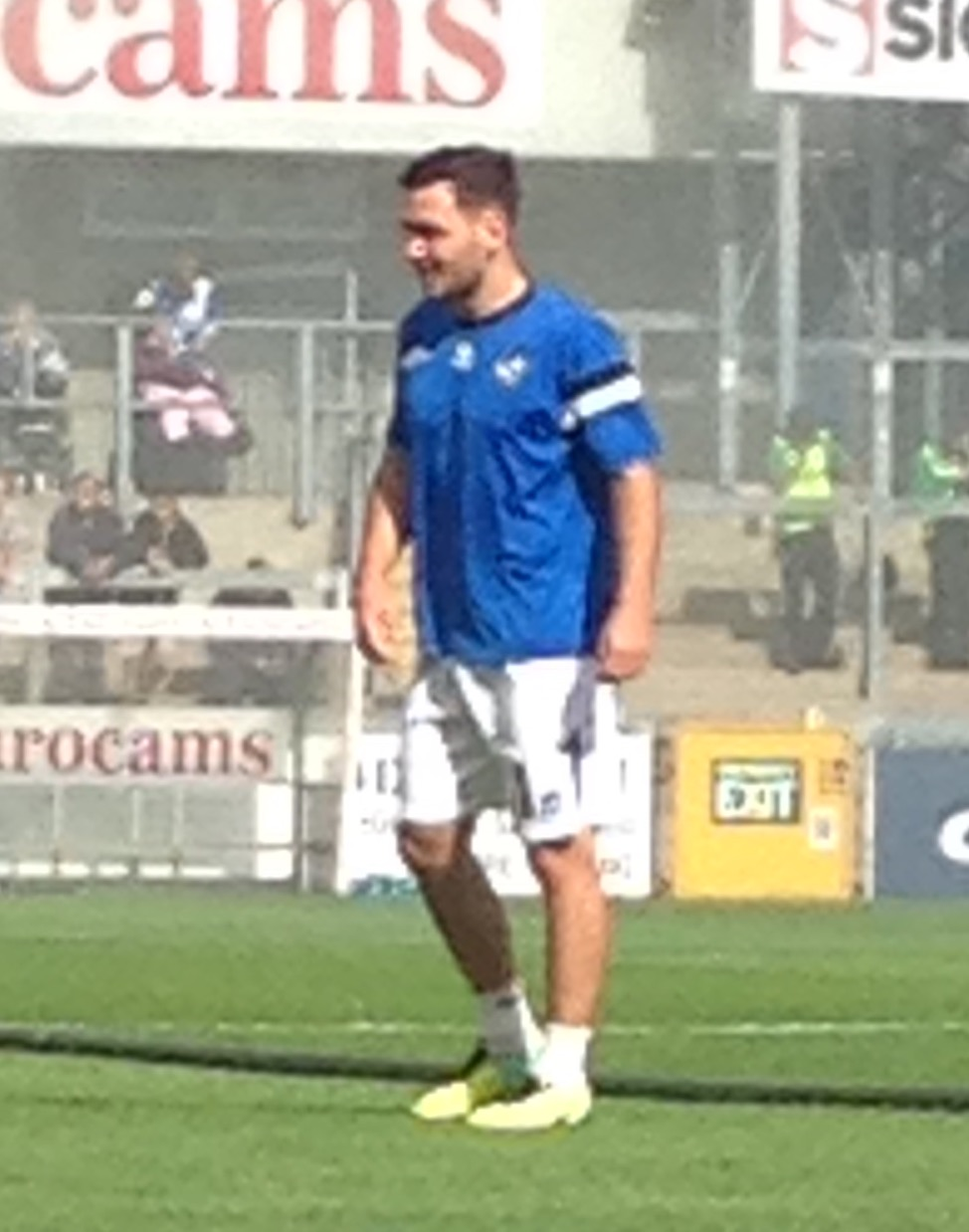
Gosling with Bristol Rovers in 2015

After leaving Exeter City, it announced on 24 June 2014 that Gosling had signed for recently relegated Conference Premier side Bristol Rovers for the 2014–15 season. He made his debut on 9 August as the Pirates began the season with a goalless draw against Grimsby Town. On 16 September, he scored his first goal for the club, concluding a 3–1 win over Nuneaton Town at the Memorial Stadium. Eleven days later, he struck the only goal for a win at Southport.

He played 23 league games across the season, scoring three goals, the last being the opener in a 7–0 rout of Alfreton Town in the last game of the regular season on 25 April 2015, relegating the opponents. He helped Rovers seal an immediate return to The Football League with a play-off victory over Grimsby on 17 May. In June 2015, he signed a new contract.

After not featuring for Bristol Rovers since the 26 December fixture against Wimbledon, Gosling joined Newport County on 26 February 2016 on an initial one-month loan. He made his debut on 1 March versus Crawley Town and played a further five times. before returning and helping Rovers earn promotion to League One. He signed a new contract with the Gas on 20 June 2016.

In August 2016 Gosling was loaned to Cambridge United of League Two on a six-month loan. His loaned was ended prematurely in November 2016 after making seven appearances for the club. On 16 January 2017, it was announced that Gosling would again go out on loan, this time to Forest Green Rovers of the National League.

=== Torquay United ===
On 6 June 2017, it was announced that Gosling had joined Torquay United following his release from Rovers. He was released by Torquay at the end of the 2017–18 season.

=== Sporting Khalsa ===
Jake signed for Midland League Premier Division side Sporting Khalsa, and made his debut on 23 November 2019, coming off the bench and scoring in a 3–1 home victory over Long Eaton United.

=== Bristol Manor Farm ===
In November 2021, Gosling joined Southern League Division One South side Bristol Manor Farm. During the 2022–23 season he was appointed captain, but departed in May 2023 after Farm survived relegation via play-offs.

=== Rushall Olympic ===
After his departure from Bristol Manor Farm, Gosling signed for National League North newcomers Rushall Olympic on 12 June 2023.

=== Thame United ===
Gosling relocated to Buckinghamshire towards the end of 2023. He trained and played for Thame United whilst looking for a club at a higher level.

== International career ==
In January 2014, it was confirmed that Gosling was eligible to play for Gibraltar in upcoming friendlies and their Euro 2016 qualifying campaign by national team coach Allen Bula, and was under consideration for his next squad. He was eventually called up to the squad for friendlies against Estonia and Malta on 26 May and 4 June 2014, respectively. Gosling made his international debut in the match against Estonia at the Lilleküla Stadium in Tallinn, starting the match and scoring the equaliser in the eventual 1–1 draw. The goal was Gibraltar's first away goal since joining UEFA. He became Gibraltar's outright top scorer of all time on 7 September 2015 when he scored their second competitive goal, a consolation at the end of an 8–1 away loss to Poland in UEFA Euro 2016 qualifying. With the goal, he also became the first Gibraltar player to score more than one goal at the international level. Upon return to Bristol Rovers, his club of the time, Gosling received a commemorative shirt in a similar style to the presentation that Wayne Rooney had received days before upon the scoring of his record-breaking fiftieth goal for England.

== Personal life ==
Gosling currently holds the rank of Corporal in the Royal Air Force, and plays in Royal Air Force Football Association club competitions alongside his semi-professional football career. He has also played for the RAF representative team and the combined UK Armed Forces representative team.

== Career statistics ==
=== Club ===
As of match played 23 April 2022

Appearances and goals by club, season and competition
Club	Season	League			FA Cup		League Cup		Other		Total	
Club	Season	Division	Apps	Goals	Apps	Goals	Apps	Goals	Apps	Goals	Apps	Goals
Exeter City	2012–13	League Two	12	1	0	0	0	0	0	0	12	1
Exeter City	2013–14	League Two	3	0	0	0	0	0	1 (Note: Appearances in the Football League Trophy)	0	4	0
Exeter City	Total		15	1	0	0	0	0	1	0	16	1
Dorchester Town (loan)	2012–13	Conference South	12	0	3	1	—		2 (Note: Appearances in the FA Trophy)	0	17	1
Gloucester City (loan)	2013–14	Conference South	12	3	0	0	—		0	0	12	3
Bristol Rovers	2014–15	Football Conference	26	3	2	0	—		1	0	29	3
Bristol Rovers	2015–16	League Two	18	0	1	0	1	0	1	0	21	0
Bristol Rovers	Total		44	3	3	0	1	0	2	0	50	3
Newport County (loan)	2015–16	League Two	6	0	—		—		—		6	0
Cambridge United (loan)	2016–17	League Two	4	0	0	0	1	0	2 (Note: Appearances in the EFL Trophy)	0	7	0
Forest Green Rovers (loan)	2016–17	National League	7	0	—		—		1	0	8	0
Torquay United	2017–18	National League	14	0	0	0	—		0	0	14	0
Sporting Khalsa	2019–20	Midland League	6	1	0	0	—		3	0	9	1
Sporting Khalsa	2020–21	Midland League	10	10	1	1	—		2	4	13	15
Sporting Khalsa	2021–22	NPL Division One Midlands	10	4	4	3	—		3 (Note: Also includesppearances in the Walsall Senior Cup)	5	17	12
Sporting Khalsa	Total		26	15	5	4	0	0	8	9	37	26
Bristol Manor Farm	2021–22	Southern League Division One South	20	4	0	0	—		0	0	20	4
Career total			160	22	11	5	2	0	16	9	189	40

=== International ===
Appearances and goals by national team and year
National team	Year	Apps	Goals
Gibraltar	2014	5	1
Gibraltar	2015	6	1
Gibraltar	2016	0	0
Gibraltar	2017	0	0
Gibraltar	2018	1	0
Total		12	2

Scores and results list Gibraltar's goal tally first, score column indicates score after each Gosling goal.

List of international goals scored by Jake Gosling
No.	Date	Venue	Cap	Opponent	Score	Result	Competition
1	26 May 2014	Lilleküla Stadium, Tallinn, Estonia	1	Estonia	1–1	1–1	Friendly
2	7 September 2015	National Stadium, Warsaw, Poland	10	Poland	1–8	1–8	UEFA Euro 2016 qualifying
