= Dominic Thomas =

English footballer (born 1995)

Personal information
- Full name: Dominic William Thomas
- Date of birth: 23 November 1995 (age 30)
- Place of birth: London, England
- Height: 6 ft 1 in (1.85 m)
- Position: Midfielder

Youth career
- 2002–2012: Charlton Athletic
- 2012–2014: Bristol Rovers

Senior career*
Years	Team	Apps	(Gls)
2014–2017	Bristol Rovers	0	(0)
- * Club domestic league appearances and goals as of 28 July 2017

Dominic William Thomas (born 23 November 1995) is an English professional footballer who plays as a midfielder. He was forced to retire from professional football due to injury after spending 5 years at League One side Bristol Rovers. Born in London, Thomas started his career at Charlton Athletic before signing a scholarship at Bristol Rovers. Thomas won the league and cup double for the Under-18s during the 2012-13 campaign. He then went on to sign his first professional contract in 2014 with Bristol Rovers at the age of 18.

== Career ==
=== Charlton Athletic ===
Thomas joined Charlton Athletic at 7 years old, where he then signed for their academy at the age of 9. He played there for 7 years until he was released at the age of 16 years. He then signed for Bristol Rovers.

=== Bristol Rovers ===
Thomas signed a scholarship at Bristol Rovers at the age of 16. In his first year as a scholar, he won the league and cup double for the Under-18s during the 2012-13 campaign. During this campaign, there was speculation that Thomas could be on his way to Liverpool Football Club. He captained the U-18s in his second year scholar & after a strong campaign was promoted to the Bristol Rovers first team before the end of the season.

On 21 April, Darrell Clarke named Thomas on the bench for the first team against Rochdale but was an unused substitute. Rovers lost the game 2–1, which contributed towards their eventual relegation from the Football League - the first time since their acceptance in 1920. On 3 May, Thomas was again named on the bench for the first team for the ultimate game of the season at home to Mansfield Town, where he was an unused substitute. Rovers lost 0-1 confirming their relegation from the Football League.

In July 2014, Thomas signed his first professional contract with Bristol Rovers.

In October 2014, Thomas made his professional debut in the FA Cup against Dorchester Town where he replaced Lee Mansell in the 84th minute. Bristol Rovers won the game 7–1. Later that season, Thomas was part of the squad who were successful in the play off final at Wembley Stadium, promoting Rovers back into the Football League 2 at the first time of asking.

In August 2015, Thomas joined Paulton Rovers on loan. Just a month later, on 26 September 2015, Thomas suffered a serious knee injury which ruled him out for the rest of the campaign. He then spent the full 2016/17 season on the sidelines while recovering from the injury. In the 2015/16 season, Bristol Rovers would finish third in League Two, earning them back-to-back promotions and a place in League One

On 26 July 2017, Thomas returned to the Bristol Rovers first team squad for the first time in 22 months in a pre-season friendly against Bath City after suffering a career threatening injury.

=== Retirement ===
Thomas announced his retirement from professional football on 1 October 2017 via his Twitter account due to not being able to overcome his knee/leg injury sustained in September 2015. He thanked his club doctor Tim Jenkins and surgeon Jonathan Webb for helping him throughout the injury.

== Personal life ==
He is the brother of Yeovil Town player Jordan Thomas, currently on loan at Torquay United.

== Career statistics ==
As of 1 October 2014

Appearances and goals by club, season and competition
Club	Season	League		FA Cup		League Cup		Other (Note: Includes appearances in the FA Trophy.)		Total	
Club	Season	Apps	Goals	Apps	Goals	Apps	Goals	Apps	Goals	Apps	Goals
Bristol Rovers	2013–14	0	0	0	0	0	0	0	0	0	0
Bristol Rovers	2014–15	0	0	1	0	-	-	0	0	1	0
Bristol Rovers	2015–16	0	0	0	0	0	0	0	0	0	0
Bristol Rovers	2016–17	0	0	0	0	0	0	0	0	0	0
Career total		0	0	1	0	0	0	0	0	1	0
