= Jamie Lucas =

Welsh footballer (born 1995)

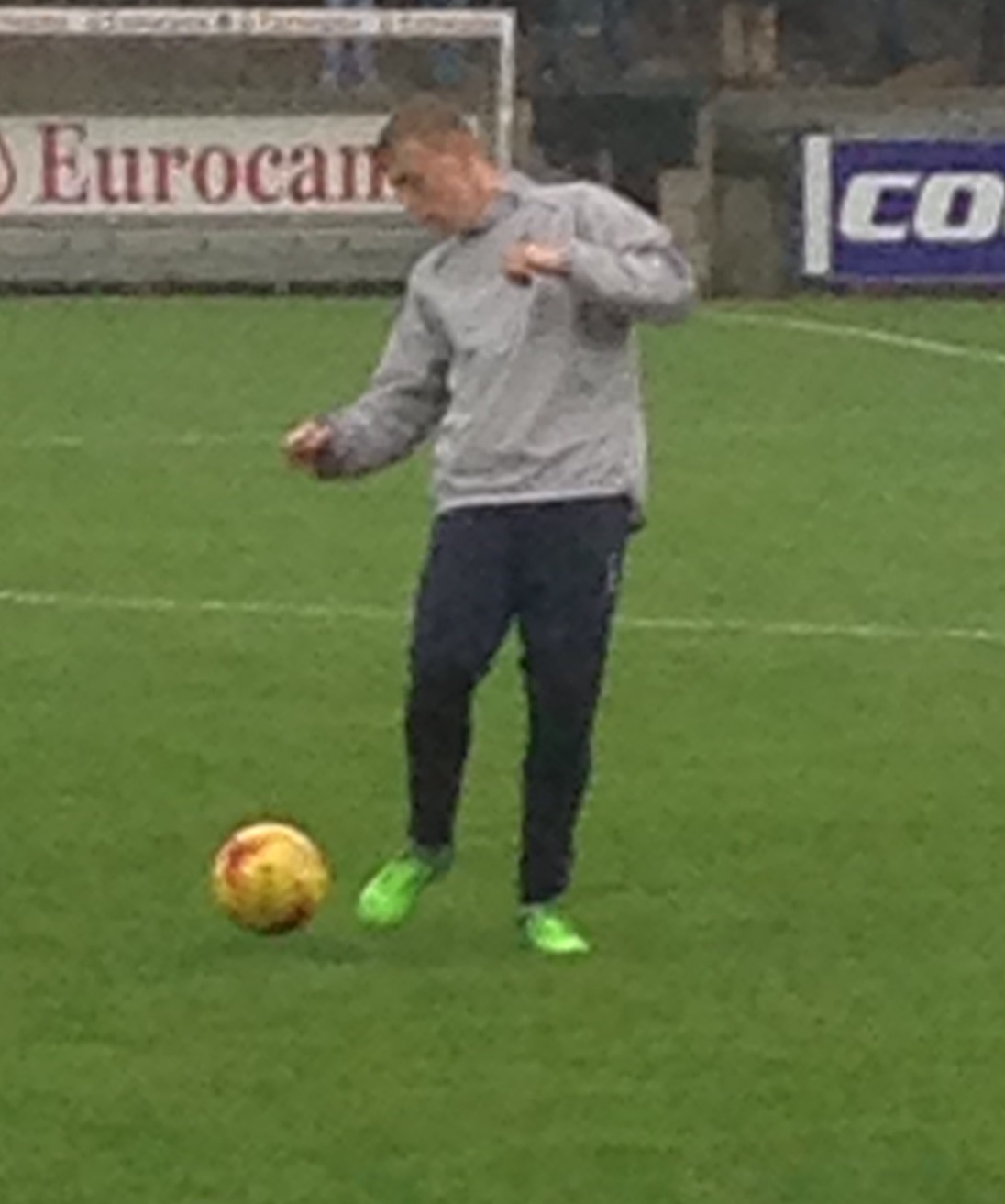
- Lucas with Bristol Rovers in 2015.

Personal information
- Full name: Jamie Lucas
- Date of birth: 6 December 1995 (age 30)
- Place of birth: Pontypridd, Wales
- Position: Striker

Youth career
- 2010–2013: Bristol Rovers

Senior career*
Years	Team	Apps	(Gls)
2013–2017	Bristol Rovers	3	(0)
2014	→ Weston-super-Mare (loan)	13	(6)
2015	→ Gloucester City (loan)	4	(0)
2015	→ Weston-super-Mare (loan)	8	(7)
2015	→ Boreham Wood (loan)	5	(2)
2015	→ Boreham Wood (loan)	6	(1)
2016	→ Boreham Wood (loan)	13	(4)
2016–2017	→ Boreham Wood (loan)	10	(1)
2017	→ Woking (loan)	9	(2)
2017	Bath City	13	(3)
2017–2018	Brackley Town	5	(0)
2018–2019	Weston-super-Mare	28	(4)
2019–2020	Halesowen Town	8	(0)
2019–2020	→ Redditch United (loan)	9	(1)
2020	→ Evesham United (loan)	6	(3)
2020–2022	Evesham United	13	(3)
2022	Worcester Raiders	5	(4)
2022	Stourport Swifts	4	(1)
2023	Droitwich Spa	0	(0)
- * Club domestic league appearances and goals as of 16:39, 27 April 2023 (UTC)

Jamie Lucas (born 6 December 1995) is a Welsh footballer who plays for Droitwich Spa as a striker.

Born near Pontypridd, South Wales, Lucas spent one season playing for Bristol Rovers Central in the Midland Junior Premier League, before joining the Under-16s as a schoolboy.

Lucas won the league and cup double for the Under-18s during the 2012-13 campaign, which subsequently earned him a professional contract in the summer of 2013.

== Club career ==
On 21 April, Lucas made his professional debut against Rochdale towards the end of the season. He came off the bench in the 79th minute, replacing Tom Parkes. Rovers lost the game 2–1, which contributed towards their eventual relegation from the Football League - the first time since their acceptance in 1920.

On 8 August, Lucas joined Conference South side Weston-super-Mare on a one-month loan deal. He made his debut the next day in a 1–0 defeat to Bishop's Stortford. His first goal for the Seagulls came in a 3–2 victory over Farnborough on 11 August. On 25 August, Lucas scored his second goal for Weston, which earned his team a 1–0 victory over Staines Town. On 5 September, Rovers agreed to extend Lucas' loan by two months. He went on to score against Hemel Hempstead Town, Ebbsfleet United, and Maidenhead United bringing his tally to five goals in 13 appearances.

On 28 November, Lucas joined Conference North side Gloucester City on loan until the new year. Lucas made six appearances for the Tigers but failed to find the net.

On 12 February, Lucas returned to Weston-super-Mare on loan. Lucas scored his first career hat-trick in a 4–3 win over Bishop's Stortford, a performance that helped him to win Conference South player of the month for February. Lucas' goalscoring form continued with a brace against Havant & Waterlooville followed by goals against both Bath City and Basingstoke Town before his return to parent club Bristol Rovers having scored seven goals in eight appearances during his second Weston-super-Mare spell.

On 7 August, Lucas signed for new National League side Boreham Wood. He made his debut the next day and scored in the 3–1 win over FC Halifax Town. After a couple of successful loan spells, Bristol Rovers called Lucas back. Lucas came on as a late substitute against Plymouth Argyle replacing Jermaine Easter. Lucas rejoined Boreham Wood on loan until the end of the season.

After an unsuccessful loan back at Boreham Wood, Lucas joined fellow National League side Woking on loan until the end of the campaign. On 18 March 2017, Lucas made his Woking debut in their 2–1 away defeat against Gateshead, featuring for 58 minutes before being replaced Ben Morris. On 25 March 2017, Lucas scored his first goal for Woking in their 4–2 home defeat against Maidstone United.

On the 28 April 2017, it was announced that Lucas would leave Bristol Rovers at the end of the 2016–17 campaign upon the expiry of his current contract.

On 23 May 2017, Lucas joined National League South side Bath City on a one-year deal. On 5 August 2017, Lucas made his Bath debut during their 3–2 away defeat to newly promoted side Bognor Regis Town, replacing Marvin Morgan in the 63rd minute. Just under a month later, he scored his first goal for Bath during their 1–1 home draw with Welling United, netting their equaliser after Harry Phipps had given the visitors the lead.

Following his release from Bath, Lucas joined National League North side Brackley Town. On 16 December 2017, Lucas made his Brackley debut during their FA Trophy tie against Braintree Town, featuring for 77 minutes in the 0–0 draw.

On 15 June 2018, it was announced that Lucas would return to Weston-super-Mare on a one-year deal.

Following a spell at Evesham United, whilst on loan from Halesowen Town, Lucas returned to The Robins on a permanent basis ahead of the 2020–21 campaign.

On 22 June 2022, after struggling with injury during the 2021–22 campaign, Lucas agreed to join Worcester Raiders. He then joined Stourport Swifts in October later that year.

Lucas signed for Droitwich Spa on 1 October 2023, becoming the clubs highest profile transfer to date.

== Career statistics ==
As of match played 18 September 2021.

Club	Season	League			FA Cup		EFL Cup		Other		Total	
Club	Season	Division	Apps	Goals	Apps	Goals	Apps	Goals	Apps	Goals	Apps	Goals
Bristol Rovers	2013–14	League Two	1	0	0	0	0	0	0	0	1	0
Bristol Rovers	2014–15	Conference Premier	0	0	0	0	—		0	0	0	0
Bristol Rovers	2015–16	League Two	1	0	0	0	0	0	1 (Note: Appearance(s) in Football League Trophy)	0	2	0
Bristol Rovers	2016–17	League One	1	0	0	0	0	0	0	0	1	0
Bristol Rovers	Total		3	0	0	0	0	0	1	0	4	0
Weston-super-Mare (loan)	2014–15	Conference South	21	13	0	0	—		0	0	21	13
Gloucester City (loan)	2014–15	Conference North	4	0	—		—		—		4	0
Boreham Wood (loan)	2015–16	National League	24	7	0	0	—		0	0	24	7
Boreham Wood (loan)	2016–17	National League	10	1	2	0	—		2 (Note: Appearance(s) in FA Trophy)	0	14	1
Boreham Wood (loan)	Total		34	8	2	0	—		2	0	38	8
Woking (loan)	2016–17	National League	9	2	—		—		—		9	2
Bath City	2017–18	National League South	13	3	3	1	—		0	0	16	4
Brackley Town	2017–18	National League North	5	0	—		—		3	0	8	0
Weston-super-Mare	2018–19	National League South	28	4	5	1	—		2	0	35	5
Halesowen Town	2019–20	Southern League Division One Central	8	0	4	0	—		3	0	15	0
Redditch United (loan)	2019–20	Southern League Premier Division Central	9	1	—		—		2 (Note: Appearance(s) in Southern League Cup)	1	11	2
Evesham United (loan)	2019–20	Southern League Division One South	6	3	—		—		—		6	3
Evesham United	2020–21	Southern League Division One South	6	3	2	1	—		4	1	12	5
Evesham United	2021–22	Southern League Division One South	7	0	1	0	—		1	0	9	0
Evesham United	Total		13	3	3	1	—		5	1	21	5
Worcester Raiders	2022–23	Hellenic League Premier Division	5	4	1	0	—		0	0	6	4
Stourport Swifts	2022–23	Midland League Premier Division	4	1	—		—		0	0	4	1
Career total			162	42	18	3	0	0	19	2	199	47
