= Tyler Lyttle =

English footballer (born 1996)

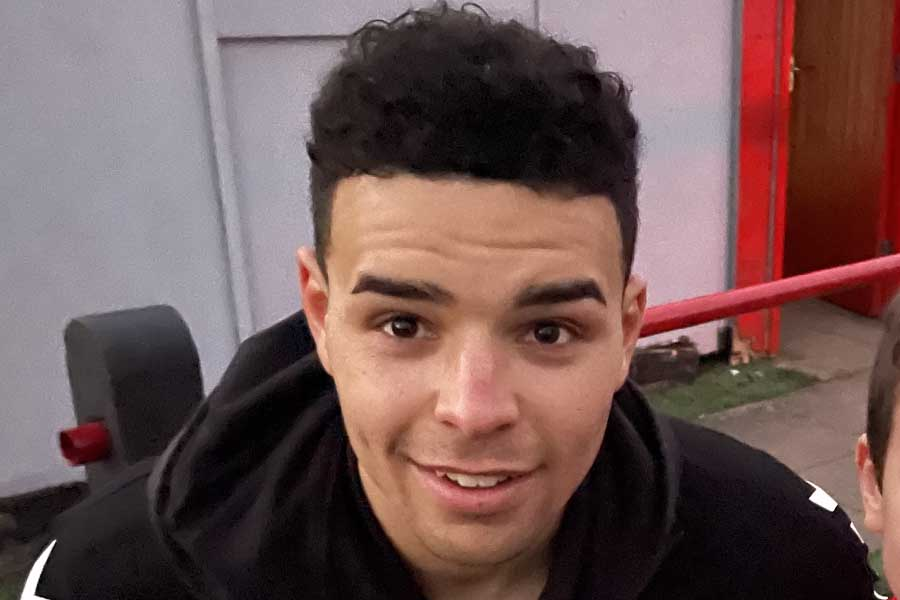
- Lyttle in January 2022

Personal information
- Full name: Tyler Lyttle
- Date of birth: 12 November 1996 (age 30)
- Place of birth: Nottingham, England
- Height: 1.77 m (5 ft 9 1/2 in)
- Position: Defender

Team information
- Current team: Tamworth
- Number: 2

Youth career
- Wolverhampton Wanderers
- 2014–2015: Bristol Rovers

Senior career*
Years	Team	Apps	(Gls)
2015–2017	Bristol Rovers	1	(0)
2015–2016	→ Nuneaton Town (loan)	6	(0)
2016	→ Truro City (loan)	5	(0)
2017	Stafford Rangers		
2017	Hednesford Town		
2017–2018	Sutton Coldfield Town	9	(0)
2018–2022	Rushall Olympic	83	(8)
2022–2023	Stourbridge	25	(7)
2023–2026	Brackley Town	103	(5)
2026–	Tamworth	3	(0)
- * Club domestic league appearances and goals as of 22:00, 9 September 2026 (UTC)

Tyler Lyttle (born 12 November 1996) is an English footballer who plays as a defender for National League club Tamworth.

== Playing career ==
=== Bristol Rovers ===
After failing to make the breakthrough at Wolverhampton Wanderers, Lyttle joined Football Conference side Bristol Rovers in 2014. Tyler failed to make any first team appearances during the 2014–15 season, but did make three appearances in the Gloucestershire Senior Cup He also went on to receive the Youth Team Player of the Year award.

Tyler signed his first professional deal on 19 June 2015. On 29 August 2015 Lyttle made his professional debut, starting in a 2–0 away loss against Leyton Orient. On 6 October 2015, Lyttle made his only other appearance of the 2015–16 season, coming on as a 90+1 minute substitute appearance for Cristian Montaño as Bristol Rovers won 2–0 against Wycombe Wanderers in the Football League Trophy.

==== Nuneaton Town (loan) ====
In December 2015, Lyttle was loaned to National League North side Nuneaton Town on an initial month long loan deal, Tyler made his debut for Nuneaton Town on 26 December 2015, playing the full match in a 3–1 away defeat to Solihull Moors

The loan move was extended until the end of the season the following month. He remained at Liberty Way until April 2016 when he was recalled by Rovers. In total Tyler made six appearances for the club.

==== Truro City (loan) ====
Lyttle signed for National League South side Truro City on 2 October 2016 on a one-month loan deal. Tyler completed the month with the club, and went on to make five appearances, but didn't score during the loan spell.

=== Stafford Rangers ===
Lyttle departed Bristol Rovers, and signed for Northern Premier League Premier Division side Stafford Rangers on 10 March 2017. Tyler remained with the club until the end of the 2016–17 season.

=== Hednesford Town ===
Tyler began the 2017–18 season on trial with National League side Macclesfield Town, however a move did not materialise and Lyttle returned to the Northern Premier League Premier Division and signed for Hednesford Town on 4 September 2017.

=== Sutton Coldfield Town ===
After just over a month with Hednesford Town, Lyttle moved on and signed for Sutton Coldfield Town on 7 October 2017.

=== Rushall Olympic ===
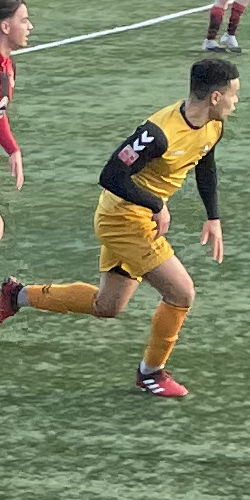
Lyttle playing for Rushall Olympic in January 2022.

Tyler signed for Southern League Premier Division Central side Rushall Olympic on 25 July 2018.

On 4 June 2019, Lyttle signed a new one-year deal with Rushall Olympic.

Rushall Olympic confirmed on 7 August 2020, that Lyttle has signed a new deal to remain with the club for the 2020–21 season.

Lyttle remained with the club for the 2021–22 season. He did an interview on 18 October 2021, saying he was ready for the challenge.

On 3 June 2022, Rushall Olympic confirmed that Lyttle had re-signed, and would make the 2022–23 season his fifth campaign with the club.

=== Stourbridge ===
On 1 September 2022, Lyttle joined Rushall Olympic's league rivals Stourbridge. Lyttle made his debut the following day when he played in an FA Cup fixture at home to Hanley Town, and even scored in the match, which finished 2–2

Tyler made his Southern League Premier Division Central debut for Stourbridge on 12 September 2022 in a home match against his former club Nuneaton Borough, the match finished goalless. Lyttle scored his first goals for Stourbridge on 2 January 2023, netting a brace in a 3–0 away victory against Redditch United. Lyttle went on to make 25 appearances and netted seven times, as Stourbridge recorded a 10th place finish for the season.

=== Brackley Town ===
On 7 June 2023, Lyttle joined National League North club Brackley Town following a successful season with Stourbridge. Tyler made his National League North debut for Brackley Town on 17 August 2023, coming on as a 81st minute substitute for Jordon Crawford in a 1–0 victory over Bishops Stortford. Lyttle helped Brackley Town finish the 2023–24 season in 2nd position in the National League North, with the season ending in bitter disappointment, as Brackley Town lost in the Play-off final 2–1 to Boston United. Tyler finished the season making 35 appearances and scoring two goals.

Following the defeat in the play-off final, Lyttle signed a new contract in May 2024, alongside team-mates Morgan Roberts and Zak Lilly. Lyttle played on the opening day of the season, as Brackley Town were defeated 3-0 at home by Scunthorpe United. Tyler finished the season making 44 appearances and scoring two goals, as Brackley Town went one better, and finished the 2024–25 season winning the National League North title.

Having helped the club achieve a first promotion to the fifth tier with a title-winning campaign in the 2024–25 season, Lyttle signed a new one-year deal in May 2025. Brackley Town had a difficult season at National League level. Tyler made 23 appearances and scored one goal, but was unable to prevent Brackley Town being relegated back the National League North, finishing the 2025–26 season in 21st position. Lyttle departed the club following relegation at the end of the season.

=== Tamworth ===
On 26 June 2026, Tamworth announced the signing of Lyttle following his departure from Brackley. He joined the club three days after Morgan Roberts, who departed Brackley alongside Lyttle. On 8 August 2026, Lyttle made his debut for Tamworth, on the opening day of the 2026–27 season, playing the full match in a 3–3 draw away at Boreham Wood.

== Personal life ==
Tyler is the son of former Swansea City, Nottingham Forest and West Bromwich Albion defender, Des Lyttle. He coached Tyler's U18 side to an ESFA National Cup win, after his release from Wolves, at the Thomas Telford Academy in Shropshire. Father and son also recently competed against each other in the Great Donnington Run for charity.

== Career statistics ==
As of match played 9 September 2026.

Appearances and goals by club, season and competition
Club	Season	League			National Cup		League Cup		Other		Total	
Club	Season	Division	Apps	Goals	Apps	Goals	Apps	Goals	Apps	Goals	Apps	Goals
Bristol Rovers	2014–15	Football Conference	0	0	0	0	—		3 (Note: Three appearance(s) in Gloucestershire Senior Cup)	0	3	0
Bristol Rovers	2015–16	League Two	1	0	0	0	0	0	1 (Note: Appearance in the Football League Trophy)	0	2	0
Bristol Rovers	2016–17	League One	0	0	0	0	0	0	0	0	0	0
Bristol Rovers	Bristol Rovers Total		1	0	0	0	0	0	4	0	5	0
Nuneaton Town (loan)	2015–16	National League North	6	0	0	0	—		1 (Note: One appearance(s) in Birmingham Senior Cup)	0	7	0
Truro City (loan)	2016–17	National League South	5	0	0	0	—		0	0	5	0
Stafford Rangers	2016–17	Northern Premier League Premier Division	—		—		—		—		—	
Hednesford Town	2017–18	Northern Premier League Premier Division	—		—		—		—		—	
Sutton Coldfield Town	2017–18	Northern Premier League Premier Division	9	0	0	0	—		0	0	9	0
Rushall Olympic	2018–19	Southern League Premier Division Central	41	3	0	0	—		0	0	41	3
Rushall Olympic	2019–20	Southern League Premier Division Central	1	0	0	0	—		1 (Note: One appearance(s) in Birmingham Senior Cup)	0	2	0
Rushall Olympic	2020–21	Southern League Premier Division Central	5	0	1	0	—		2 (Note: Two appearance(s) in FA Trophy)	0	8	0
Rushall Olympic	2021–22	Southern League Premier Division Central	35	5	0	0	—		11 (Note: Four appearance(s) in Southern League Cup) (Note: One appearance(s) in FA Trophy) (Note: Four appearance(s) in Walsall Senior Cup) (Note: One appearance(s) in Staffordshire Senior Cup) (Note: One appearance(s) in Southern League Premier Division Central play-offs)	1 (Note: One goal(s) in Southern League Cup)	46	6
Rushall Olympic	2022–23	Southern League Premier Division Central	1	0	0	0	—		0	0	1	0
Rushall Olympic	Rushall Olympic Total		83	8	1	0	0	0	14	1	98	9
Stourbridge	2022–23	Southern League Premier Division Central	25	7	2	1	—		6 (Note: Two appearance(s) in FA Trophy) (Note: Four appearance(s) in Birmingham Senior Cup)	0	33	8
Brackley Town	2023–24	National League North	35	2	0	0	—		0	0	35	2
Brackley Town	2024–25	National League North	44	2	0	0	—		0	0	44	2
Brackley Town	2025–26	National League	23	1	2	0	—		1	1	26	2
Brackley Town	Brackley Town Total		102	5	2	0	0	0	1	1	105	6
Tamworth	2026–27	National League	3	0	0	0	—		1 (Note: One appearance in National League Cup)	0	4	0
Career total			234	21	4	1	0	0	27	2	266	23

== Honours ==
Rushall Olympic:

- Walsall Senior Cup: 2021–22, 2022–23, 2023–24

Brackley Town:

- National League North: 2024–25
