= Stuart Sinclair =

English footballer (born 1987)

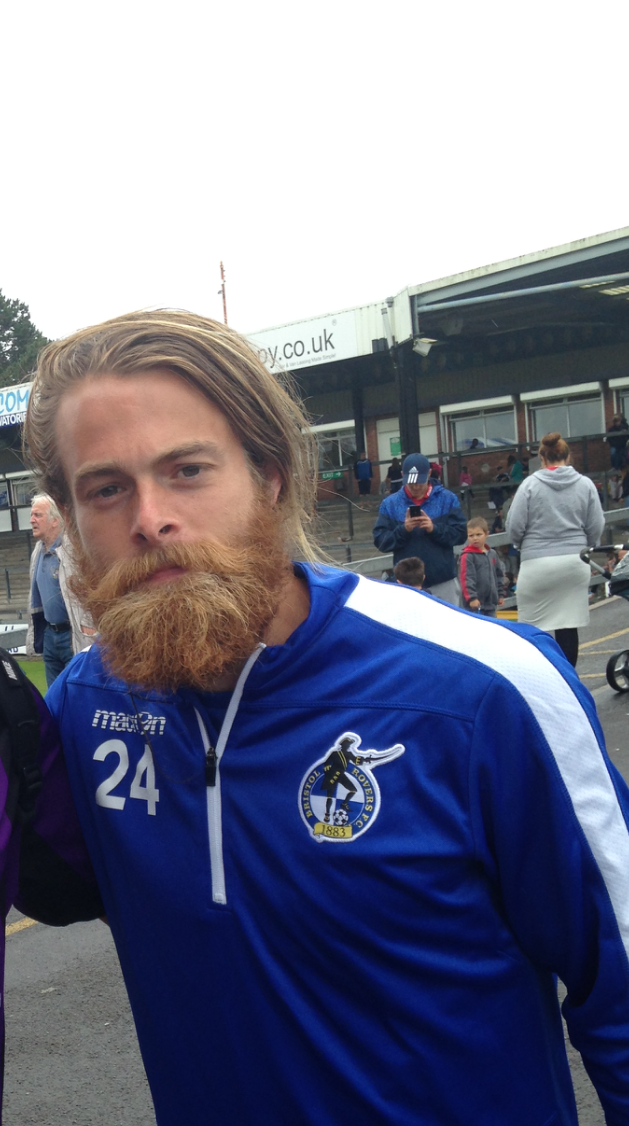
- Sinclair with Bristol Rovers in 2016

Personal information
- Full name: Stuart Robert Sinclair
- Date of birth: 19 November 1987 (age 38)
- Place of birth: Houghton Conquest, England
- Height: 5 ft 6 in (1.68 m)
- Position: Midfielder

Youth career
- 2002–2004: Luton Town

Senior career*
Years	Team	Apps	(Gls)
2004–2006	Luton Town	0	(0)
2006–2007	Cambridge City	36	(1)
2007–2008	Bedford Town		
2008–2009	Dunstable Town		
2009–2012	Arlesey Town	99	(4)
2012–2014	Salisbury City	87	(6)
2014–2019	Bristol Rovers	142	(7)
2019–2021	Walsall	43	(2)
2023	Real Bedford	5	(0)
Total		412	(20)
- * Club domestic league appearances and goals as of 14:45, 23 April 2024 (UTC)

Stuart Robert Sinclair (born 19 November 1987) is an English former professional footballer who played as a midfielder.

== Career ==
=== Bristol Rovers ===
Sinclair joined newly relegated Conference Premier club Bristol Rovers in the summer of 2014. During the 2014–15 season, he helped the club to gain an instant promotion back to the Football League. On 8 August 2015, Sinclair made his Football League debut in a 1–0 home defeat to Northampton Town. During Sinclair's third Football League appearance, he netted a late winner against Luton Town on 18 August 2015. Sinclair continued to perform well, picking up various Man of the Match awards. His second and final goal of the season was during a 1–1 draw away to Exeter City. After picking up an injury which required surgery and saw him out of action for over six weeks, he missed the end of the 2015–16 season, including a dramatic match against Dagenham & Redbridge on the final day, which ended in a 2–1 win, after a 92nd-minute winner earned Sinclair and the club back to back promotions.

Sinclair made his first appearance of 2016–17 on the opening day of the season in a 3–1 defeat away to Scunthorpe United. His first goal of the season came in a 2–0 victory away to Oxford United on 4 March 2017. Sinclair was sent off in a 3–0 defeat away to Bury on 14 March after being booked twice for simulation.

Sinclair was released when his contract expired at the end of the 2018–19 season having become a strong fan-favourite during his time with the club, earning cult hero status.

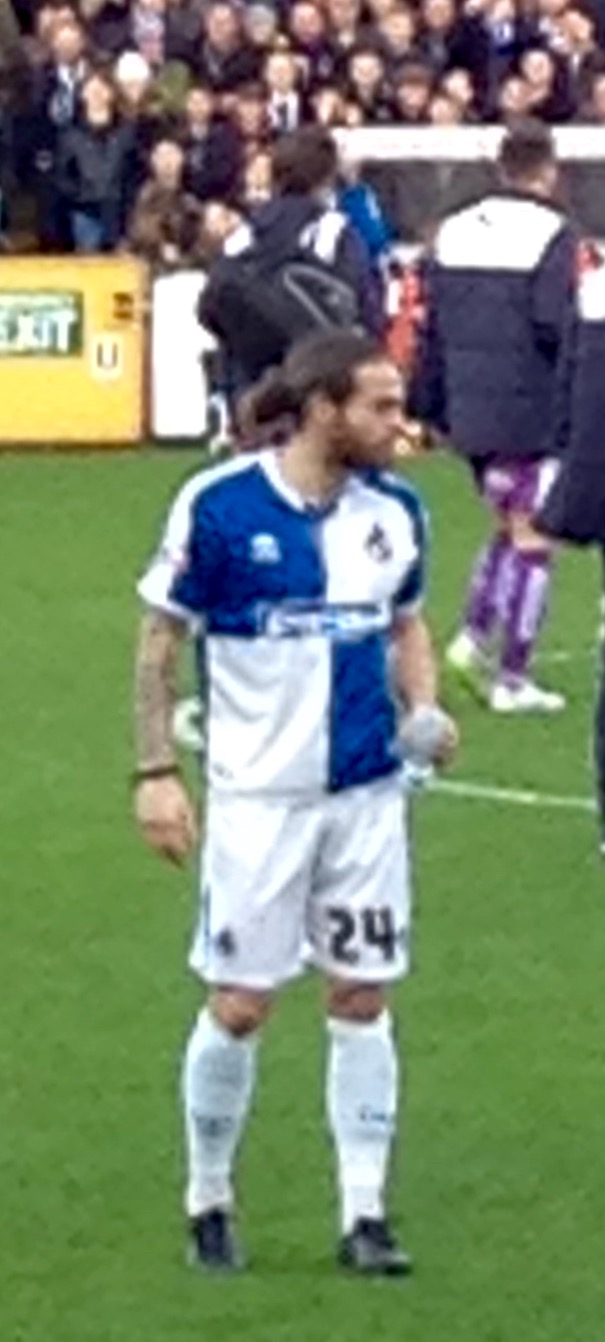
Sinclair playing for Bristol Rovers in 2016

=== Walsall ===
Sinclair signed for Walsall, who were newly relegated to League Two, on 21 May 2019 on a contract of undisclosed length, effective from 1 July. He made his debut on the opening day of the 2019–20 season as Walsall won 1–0 away to Northampton Town.

Towards the end of the 2020–21 season, with Walsall having a limited backroom coaching staff, Sinclair stepped up to help coach some of the younger players in the squad. At the end of the season, after two seasons at the club, Sinclair was one of eight players to not be offered a new contract and would leave Walsall upon the expiration of his contract.

=== Retirement ===
Following his departure from Walsall, Sinclair moved to Canada. In 2023, during a short spell back in England, he joined Spartan South Midlands Division One club Real Bedford, managed by brother Rob.

== Personal life ==
Sinclair's brother, Rob Sinclair, also became a professional footballer.

== Career statistics ==
As of end of 2022–23 season

Appearances and goals by club, season and competition
Club	Season	League			FA Cup		League Cup		Other		Total	
Club	Season	Division	Apps	Goals	Apps	Goals	Apps	Goals	Apps	Goals	Apps	Goals
Arlesey Town	2009–10	Southern League Division One Midlands	38	1	2	0	—		13 (Note: Seven appearances and one goal in FA Trophy, three appearances and one goal in Southern League Cup, three appearances and one goal in Bedfordshire Senior Cup)	3	53	4
Arlesey Town	2010–11	Southern League Division One Central	41	3	3	0	—		9 (Note: One appearance in Bedfordshire Premier Cup, five in FA Trophy, one in Southern League Cup, two in Bedfordshire Senior Cup)	0	53	3
Arlesey Town	2011–12	Southern League Premier Division	20	0	5	0	—		3 (Note: One appearance in Southern League Cup, one in FA Trophy, one in Bedfordshire Senior Cup)	0	28	0
Arlesey Town	Total		99	4	10	0	—		25	3	134	7
Salisbury City	2011–12	Conference South	21	2	—		—		—		21	2
Salisbury City	2012–13	Conference South	31	4	0	0	—		1 (Note: Appearance in FA Trophy)	0	32	4
Salisbury City	2013–14	Conference Premier	35	0	3	0	—		1	0	39	0
Salisbury City	Total		87	6	3	0	—		2	0	92	6
Bristol Rovers	2014–15	Conference Premier	27	2	1	0	—		1	0	29	2
Bristol Rovers	2015–16	League Two	30	2	1	0	1	0	2 (Note: Appearances in Football League Trophy)	0	34	2
Bristol Rovers	2016–17	League One	38	1	3	0	2	0	2 (Note: Appearance(s) in EFL Trophy)	0	45	1
Bristol Rovers	2017–18	League One	29	2	1	1	2	0	1	0	33	3
Bristol Rovers	2018–19	League One	18	0	1	0	0	0	2	0	21	0
Bristol Rovers	Total		142	7	7	1	5	0	8	0	162	8
Walsall	2019–20	League Two	26	2	0	0	1	0	0	0	27	2
Walsall	2020–21	League Two	17	0	1	0	0	0	2	0	20	0
Walsall	Total		43	2	1	0	1	0	2	0	47	2
Real Bedford	2022–23	Spartan South Midlands Division One	5	0	0	0	—		0	0	5	0
Career total			376	19	21	1	6	0	37	3	440	23

== Honours ==
Arlesey Town

- Southern League Division One Central: 2010–11

Salisbury City

- Conference South play-offs: 2012–13

Bristol Rovers

- Conference Premier runner-up: 2014–15
- Conference Premier play-offs: 2014–15
