= Colin Sexstone =

British businessman

Colin Sexstone (2 July 1948 ― 24 February 2023) was a chairman of Bristol City Football Club and operated as a non-executive director at Plymouth Argyle and Bristol Rovers.

== Education ==
Born in South Bristol and educated at Luckwell, South Street and Colston’s school, Sexstone went on to complete a Business Studies degree at the Bristol College of Commerce.

== Career ==
Sexstone started his professional career working for G.B. Britton before joining the R.A.F where he enjoyed a 25 year career, retiring in 1996 as Group Captain.

Appointed as chief executive of Gloucestershire County Cricket Club in 1996, Sexstone helped the club develop the County Ground to international standards. During his five year tenure, Gloucestershire went onto win five trophies, including the 1999 Benson & Hedges Super Cup, 2000 Benson & Hedges Cup, the Natwest Trophy in 1999 and 2000 as well as the 45-over 2000 Norwich Union National League.

Sexstone joined Bristol City as chief executive in 2001, helping to lead the club's new £92m regional stadium development at neighbouring Ashton Vale.

He replaced Steve Lansdown as chairman of the club on 1 June 2011 before stepping down as chairman on 31 May 2012 to "pursue other interests". He was replaced by director Keith Dawe.

In July 2011 Sexstone was appointed chairman of boutique law firm Cook & Co Solicitors.

On 13 November 2012 Sexstone was appointed a non-executive director at League Two club Plymouth Argyle. He left the role in 2015 to become a non-executive director at fellow league 2 club Bristol Rovers.

Sexstone died on 24 February 2023 at the age of 74.
