= Daniel Leadbitter =

English footballer

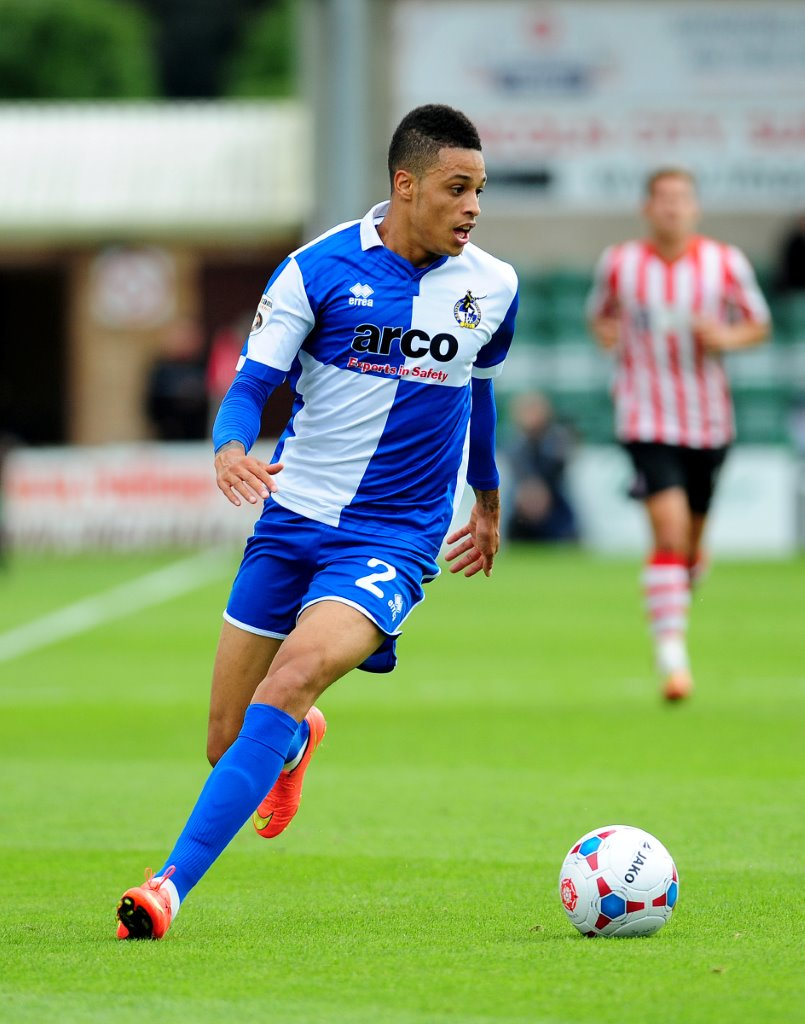
- Leadbitter playing for Bristol Rovers in 2015

Personal information
- Full name: Daniel William Leadbitter
- Date of birth: 7 October 1990 (age 36)
- Place of birth: Newcastle upon Tyne, England
- Position: Defender

Team information
- Current team: Gloucester City

Youth career
- 1998–2011: Newcastle United

Senior career*
Years	Team	Apps	(Gls)
2011–2013	Torquay United	15	(0)
2013–2014	Hereford United	38	(0)
2014–2019	Bristol Rovers	115	(1)
2019–2021	Newport County	3	(0)
2020–2021	→ Yeovil Town (loan)	10	(0)
2021	→ Gloucester City (loan)	1	(0)
2021–2023	Gloucester City	67	(2)
2024–	Gloucester City	46	(0)
- * Club domestic league appearances and goals as of 14:37, 29 December 2025 (UTC)

Daniel William Leadbitter (born 7 October 1990) is an English semi-professional footballer who plays as a right-back for Southern League Premier Division South club Gloucester City. He is a personal development manager with the PFA.

== Career ==
=== Newcastle United ===
Leadbitter joined local club Wideopen Juniors aged seven. He first played for Newcastle United's academy a year later. Initially a centre-back, Leadbitter was converted to a right-back aged 15 due to being shorter than most of his peers; reflecting on the positional change in 2012, he said: "I was too small to stay at centre-back, so I switched to right-back and I've found a home there now." He signed a contract with Newcastle in July 2007, having made his debut for the Newcastle Academy U18s against Middlesbrough in March of that year. His first goal for the academy arrived in October, in a match against Leeds United. He went on to play for Newcastle's reserve side after graduating from the club's Little Benton Academy, However, he was released in June 2011 without making a first-team appearance.

=== Torquay United ===
Torquay United manager Martin Ling became aware of Leadbitter after watching him playing for Newcastle's Reserves whilst scouting for Hibernian and Walsall. Upon his release from Newcastle, Ling signed him on a two-year contract on 28 June 2011,

Leadbitter's league debut for Torquay was delayed due to a hamstring injury and he missed most of the first few months, but finally made his debut for Torquay on 8 October 2011 at the Valley Parade in the Gulls' 1–0 loss to Bradford City. He made his first league start for Torquay in the 2–1 victory over Gillingham. Despite Oastler being available for selection after his suspension expired, Leadbitter retained his place for United's 1–0 win over Morecambe F.C on 27 October 2012; he was voted Man of the match by the match sponsors. The defender was restored to Torquay's starting line-up for the 1–0 loss at Bradford City on 8 December 2012 due to Oastler's suspension; the fixture came a year and two months to the day after Leadbitter's club debut at the same ground, with an identical scoreline. Leadbitter played in United's 1–0 defeat against Fleetwood Town on 9 February 2013; assistant manager Shaun Taylor later claimed Leadbitter's performance was "probably his best game for the club." The right-back retained his place for the 3–1 loss to Rotherham United on 12 February and went on to make 11 more appearances before his release in May 2012.

=== Hereford United ===
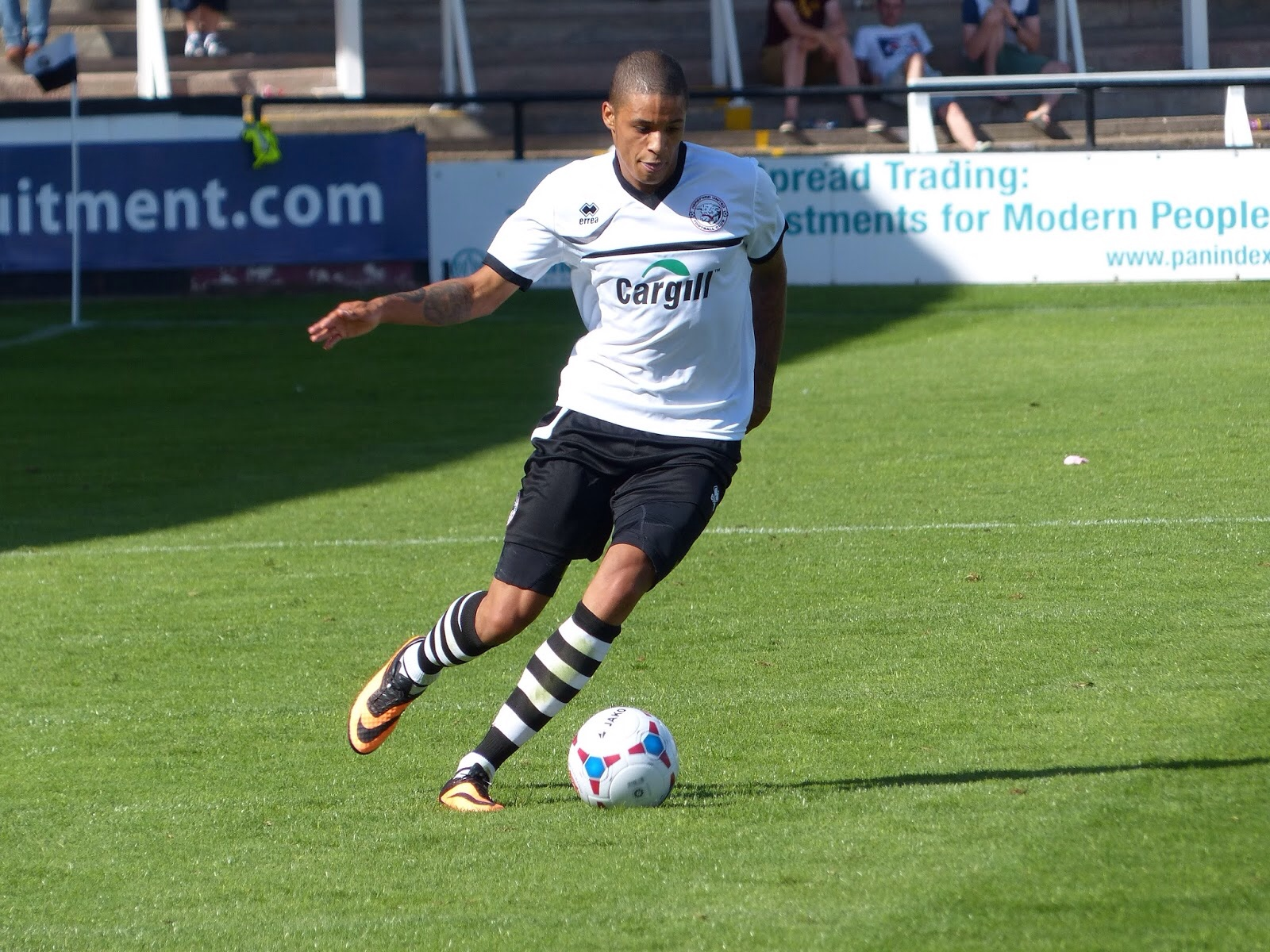
Leadbitter playing for Hereford United in 2014.

On 1 August 2013, Leadbitter signed a one-year deal with Hereford United. The right-back made his debut for Hereford on the opening day of the season against Braintree Town on 10 August, playing the full 90 minutes in a 1–1 draw. He made a good start to his Hereford career, quickly establishing himself as a first-team regular, and by October a Sky Sports publication claimed that "a number of clubs from the Football League have been keeping tabs on Daniel...he is really flourishing under the management of Martin Foyle."

=== Bristol Rovers ===
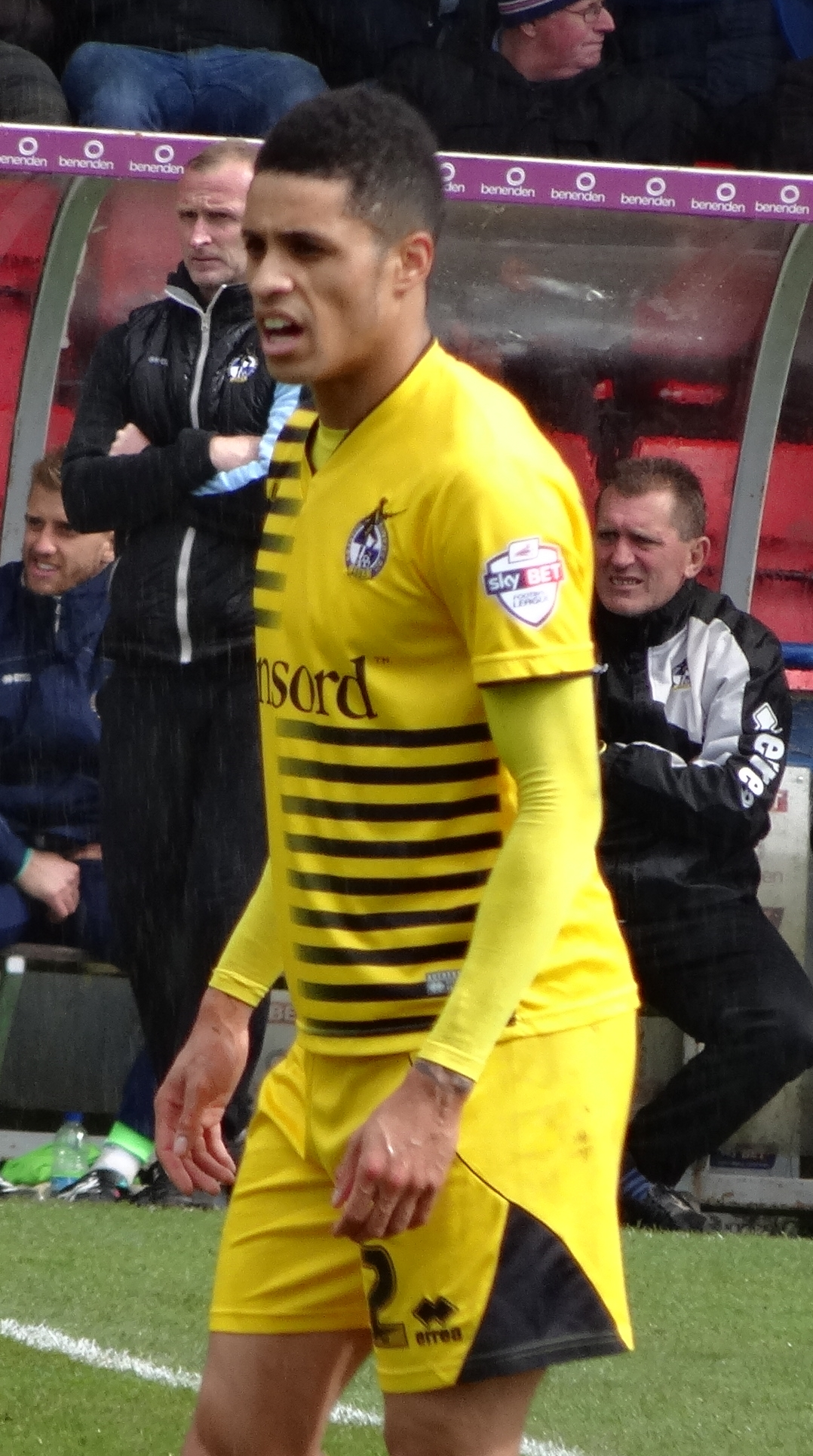
Leadbitter playing for Bristol Rovers in 2016

Leadbitter joined relegated Conference Premier side Bristol Rovers prior to the 2014–15 season. He scored his first professional goal on 13 September 2014 in a 2–3 away win at Lincoln. The team went on to miss out on the Conference Premier league title on the final day by 1 point but earned promotion via the playoffs, triumphing on penalties against Grimsby Town, securing a return to the football league at the first time of asking.

He was offered a new contract by Bristol Rovers at the end of the 2017–18 season.

On 8 May 2019, Leadbitter was announced to be one of 9 players who wouldn't be retained at the end of their contracts bringing his five-season spell at the club, during which he gained two promotions to an end.

=== Newport County ===
On 20 June 2019, Leadbitter joined Newport County on a two-year contract. He made his debut for Newport on 13 August 2019 in the starting line up for the EFL Cup first round win against Gillingham.

On 4 June 2021 it was announced that he would leave Newport County at the end of the season, following the expiry of his contract.

==== Yeovil Town loan ====
On 4 September 2020, Leadbitter joined National League side Yeovil Town on loan until the end of the 2020–21 season. On 18 January 2021, Leadbitter's loan was terminated early and he returned to Newport having made 12 appearances for Yeovil.

=== Gloucester City ===
On 2 February 2021, Leadbitter signed for National League North side Gloucester City on loan until the end of the 2020–21 season.

On 2 July 2021, Leadbitter signed for Gloucester City on a permanent basis following his release from Newport.

In June 2024, Leadbitter came back from his one-year playing break, returning to Gloucester City following their relegation to the Southern League Premier Division South.

== Post-retirement career ==
In July 2023, Leadbitter joined the PFA as a personal development manager.

== Personal life ==
Leadbitter was born in Newcastle with a mixed English / Jamaican background. He attended Gosforth High School prior to playing for hometown club Newcastle United. At school, he excelled at athletics, reaching the finals of the 400m event at the English Schools Championships. The defender comes from a family of footballers: his uncle, Roger Palmer, played for Manchester City before becoming Oldham Athletic's all-time leading goalscorer, while his cousins Marcus Wood (currently with Southport) and Tyrell Palmer played in the English Lower League Pyramid after coming through the Academy at Bolton Wanderers.

== Career statistics ==
As of end of 2024–25 season

Appearances and goals by club, season and competition
Club	Season	League			FA Cup		League Cup		Other		Total	
Club	Season	Division	Apps	Goals	Apps	Goals	Apps	Goals	Apps	Goals	Apps	Goals
Torquay United	2011–12	League Two	2	0	0	0	0	0	0	0	2	0
Torquay United	2012–13	League Two	13	0	1	0	0	0	1 (Note: Appearance in the Football League Trophy)	0	15	0
Torquay United	Total		15	0	1	0	0	0	1	0	17	0
Hereford United	2013–14	Conference Premier	38	0	2	0	—		1 (Note: Appearance in the FA Trophy)	0	41	0
Bristol Rovers	2014–15	Conference Premier	24	1	0	0	—		1	0	25	1
Bristol Rovers	2015–16	League Two	33	0	1	0	1	0	1	0	36	0
Bristol Rovers	2016–17	League One	30	0	1	0	2	0	3 (Note: Appearances in the EFL Trophy)	0	36	0
Bristol Rovers	2017–18	League One	17	0	1	0	2	0	2	0	22	0
Bristol Rovers	2018–19	League One	11	0	2	0	1	0	4	0	18	0
Bristol Rovers	Total		115	1	5	0	6	0	11	0	137	1
Newport County	2019–20	League Two	3	0	0	0	1	0	2	0	6	0
Newport County	2020–21	League Two	0	0	0	0	0	0	0	0	0	0
Newport County	Total		3	0	0	0	1	0	2	0	6	0
Yeovil Town (loan)	2020–21	National League	10	0	2	0	—		0	0	12	0
Gloucester City (loan)	2020–21	National League North	1	0	—		—		0	0	1	0
Gloucester City	2021–22	National League North	32	1	2	0	—		1	0	35	1
Gloucester City	2022–23	National League North	35	1	2	0	—		1	0	38	1
Gloucester City	Total		67	2	4	0	—		2	0	73	2
Gloucester City	2024–25	Southern League; Premier Division South	31	0	0	0	—		3 (Note: One appearance in FA Trophy, two appearances in Southern League Premier Division South play-offs)	0	34	0
Career total			280	3	14	0	7	0	20	0	321	3
