= Nathan Blissett =

English footballer (born 1990)

Personal information
- Full name: Nathan Anthon Blissett
- Date of birth: 29 June 1990 (age 36)
- Place of birth: West Bromwich, England
- Height: 6 ft 5 in (1.96 m)
- Position: Forward

Team information
- Current team: Telford Town (dual-registration from Hednesford Town)

Youth career
- Staffordshire University
- Kidsgrove Athletic

Senior career*
Years	Team	Apps	(Gls)
2011–2012	Romulus	34	(13)
2012–2015	Kidderminster Harriers	59	(10)
2013	→ Cambridge United (loan)	7	(2)
2013–2014	→ Hednesford Town (loan)	9	(4)
2014	→ Bristol Rovers (loan)	8	(3)
2014–2016	Bristol Rovers	17	(2)
2015	→ Tranmere Rovers (loan)	5	(1)
2015–2016	→ Lincoln City (loan)	3	(0)
2016–2017	Torquay United	41	(12)
2017–2018	Plymouth Argyle	31	(5)
2018	→ Macclesfield Town (loan)	16	(5)
2018	Macclesfield Town	19	(0)
2018–2020	Solihull Moors	41	(13)
2020–2022	Maidenhead United	56	(8)
2022–2023	AFC Telford United	27	(1)
2022–2024	Stafford Rangers	31	(4)
2024	Bromsgrove Sporting	11	(3)
2025–	Hednesford Town	20	(5)
2026–	→ Telford Town (dual-registration)	0	(0)
- * Club domestic league appearances and goals as of 18:02, 26 March 2026 (UTC)

Nathan Anthon Blissett (born 29 June 1990) is an English former professional footballer who plays as a forward for Telford Town on dual-registration from National League North club Hednesford Town.

He made appearances for Kidderminster Harriers, Cambridge United, Bristol Rovers, Tranmere Rovers, Torquay United, Plymouth Argyle, Macclesfield Town, Solihull Moors and Maidenhead United.

== Club career ==
Born in West Bromwich, Blissett had youth spells at Staffordshire University and Kidsgrove Athletic. He joined Romulus in the 2011 summer, after having a successful trial, and scored 13 goals in his only season at the club.

On 17 August 2012 Blissett signed a one-year deal with Conference Premier side Kidderminster Harriers. On 4 March of the following year, after being rarely used, he joined fellow league team Cambridge United in a one-month loan deal, with Michael Gash moving in the opposite direction.

Blissett also had two loan stints at Hednesford Town in 2014. On 20 November of that year he joined Bristol Rovers; initially in a loan deal, he signed permanently in January 2015.

After achieving promotion with Bristol Rovers in 2015, Blissett was loaned to Tranmere Rovers on 21 August. He returned to his parent club in October, and made his Football League debut on 20 October, coming on as a second-half substitute for Matt Taylor in a 0–0 home draw against Notts County.

Whilst at Bristol Rovers, the forward was loaned out to both Tranmere Rovers and Lincoln City. He played 5 times (scoring once) for Tranmere, and played 3 times for Lincoln.

=== Torquay United ===
On 14 January 2016 Nathan penned an eighteen-month contract with Torquay United with the agreement being initially until the end of the season, with the option of another year. He made 17 appearances for Torquay in which he scored 8 goals. In the 2016–17 season, Blissett played half a season for Torquay before making the move up to League 2 with promotion hopefuls Plymouth Argyle.

=== Plymouth Argyle ===
In the January transfer window of the 2016–17 season, Nathan Blissett signed a deal with Plymouth Argyle worth £15,000. He was the first player to have a fee paid by Argyle since 2012. Blissett scored his first goal for the club in a 1–1 draw away to Wycombe Wanderers.

=== Macclesfield Town ===
On 15 January 2018, Blissett joined Macclesfield Town on a loan until the end of the season. Blissett went on to score 5 goals in 16 appearances, helping Macclesfield Town to win the National League. After his release from Plymouth Argyle, Blissett went on to sign a permanent deal with Macclesfield Town.

=== Solihull Moors ===
On Friday 21 December 2018, Blissett signed for National League side Solihull Moors on a deal until the end of the 2019–20 season. He made his debut for the club on 26 December 2018, in a 4–0 away victory at Chesterfield in which he scored the opening two goals. In all, Blissett scored 15 times in 52 games for Solihull. He was released at the end of the 2019–20 season.

=== Maidenhead United ===
Blissett joined Maidenhead United on 25 July 2020. He left the Magpies at the end of the 2021-22 season, after nine goals in 59 games.

=== AFC Telford United ===
In June 2022, Blissett joined National League North club AFC Telford United.

=== Stafford Rangers ===
On 25 February 2023, Blissett signed for Northern Premier League Premier Division club Stafford Rangers having been released by AFC Telford United the previous day.

=== Bromsgrove Sporting ===
In February 2024, Blissett joined Southern League Premier Division Central club Bromsgrove Sporting.

On 16 May 2024, Blissett announced his retirement from football.

=== Hednesford Town ===
Blissett came out of retirement to join Hednesford Town in January 2025.

In March 2026, having missed over six months through injury, he joined North West Counties Division One South club Telford Town on a dual-registration basis.

== Personal life ==
Blissett's uncle, Luther Blissett, was also a footballer and a forward. He notably represented Watford, Bournemouth, Milan and Derry City, aside from appearing in 14 matches and scoring three goals for England at full international level.

Blissett qualified as a mortgage and insurance provider in 2021. In May 2023 Blissett set up his own mortgage brokerage, Dwello Mortgages. In September of the same year, his firm sponsored the shirts of Telford-based youth team Lawley Lightmoor Comets U13s.

== Career statistics ==
As of 20 March 2026

Appearances and goals by club, season and competition
Club	Season	League			FA Cup		League Cup		Other		Total	
Club	Season	Division	Apps	Goals	Apps	Goals	Apps	Goals	Apps	Goals	Apps	Goals
Kidderminster Harriers	2012–13	Conference Premier	25	3	2	0	—		2 (Note: Appearance(s) in FA Trophy)	0	29	3
Kidderminster Harriers	2013–14	Conference Premier	16	3	2	0	—		1	0	19	3
Kidderminster Harriers	2014–15	Conference Premier	18	4	1	0	—		0	0	19	4
Kidderminster Harriers	Total		59	10	5	0	—		3	0	67	10
Cambridge United (loan)	2012–13	Conference Premier	7	2	—		—		—		7	2
Hednesford Town (loan)	2013–14	Conference North	9	4	—		—		—		9	4
Bristol Rovers (loan)	2014–15	Conference Premier	8	3	—		—		1	0	9	3
Bristol Rovers	2014–15	Conference Premier	14	2	—		—		3 (Note: Appearance(s) in Conference Premier play-offs)	0	17	2
Bristol Rovers	2015–16	League Two	2	0	0	0	0	0	1 (Note: Appearance(s) in EFL Trophy/Football League Trophy)	0	3	0
Bristol Rovers	Total		16	2	0	0	0	0	4	0	20	2
Tranmere Rovers (loan)	2015–16	National League	5	1	—		—		—		5	1
Lincoln City (loan)	2015–16	National League	3	0	—		—		1	0	4	0
Torquay United	2015–16	National League	17	8	—		—		—		17	8
Torquay United	2016–17	National League	24	4	2	0	—		1	0	27	4
Torquay United	Total		41	12	2	0	—		1	0	44	12
Plymouth Argyle	2016–17	League Two	9	2	—		—		—		9	2
Plymouth Argyle	2017–18	League One	13	1	0	0	1	0	2	1	16	2
Plymouth Argyle	Total		22	3	0	0	1	0	2	1	25	4
Macclesfield Town (loan)	2017–18	National League	16	5	—		—		—		16	5
Macclesfield Town	2018-19	League Two	19	0	1	0	2	0	3	1	25	1
Macclesfield Town	Total		35	5	1	0	2	0	3	1	41	6
Solihull Moors	2018–19	National League	22	9	—		—		5 (Note: Four appearances and two goals in FA Trophy, one appearance in National League playoffs)	2	27	11
Solihull Moors	2019–20	National League	19	4	2	0	—		4 (Note: Two appearances in FA Trophy, two appearances in Scottish Challenge Cup)	0	25	4
Solihull Moors	Total		41	13	2	0	0	0	9	2	52	15
Maidenhead United	2020–21	National League	24	6	1	0	—		1	0	26	6
Maidenhead United	2021–22	National League	31	2	2	1	—		0	0	33	3
Maidenhead United	Total		55	8	3	1	0	0	1	0	59	9
AFC Telford United	2022–23	National League North	27	1	1	1	—		2	0	30	2
Stafford Rangers	2023–24	NPL Premier Division	22	2	2	1	—		3	1	27	4
Bromsgrove Sporting	2023–24	Southern Football League Premier Division Central	11	3	—		—		0	0	11	3
Hednesford Town	2024–25	NPL Division One West	14	4	0	0	—		2 (Note: Appearance(s) in Northern Premier League Division One West play-offs)	0	16	4
Hednesford Town	2025–26	NPL Premier Division	6	1	2	0	—		0	0	8	1
Hednesford Town	Total		20	5	2	0	0	0	2	0	24	5
Career total			382	74	18	3	3	0	32	5	435	82

== Honours ==
Bristol Rovers

- Conference Premier play-offs: 2015

Plymouth Argyle

- EFL League Two runner-up: 2016–17

Macclesfield Town

- National League: 2017–18

Hednesford Town

- Northern Premier League Division One West play-offs: 2025
