= Lee Mansell =

English former professional footballer (born 1982)

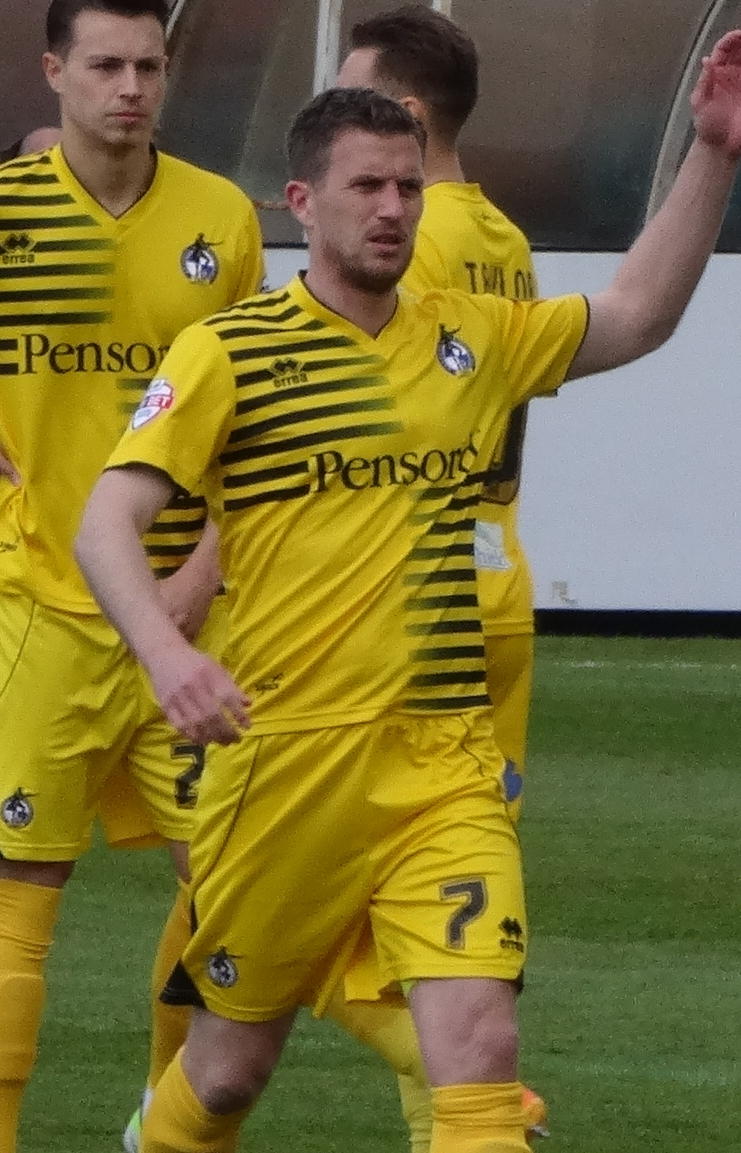
- Mansell playing for Bristol Rovers in 2016

Personal information
- Full name: Lee Richard Samuel Mansell
- Date of birth: 23 September 1982 (age 44)
- Place of birth: Gloucester, England
- Position: Midfielder

Youth career
- –2000: Luton Town

Senior career*
Years	Team	Apps	(Gls)
2000–2005	Luton Town	47	(8)
2003	→ Nuneaton Borough (loan)	5	(2)
2005–2006	Oxford United	44	(1)
2006–2014	Torquay United	339	(23)
2014–2017	Bristol Rovers	81	(7)
Total		516	(41)

Managerial career
- 2021–2022: Gloucester City
- * Club domestic league appearances and goals

Lee Richard Samuel Mansell (born 23 September 1982) is an English former professional footballer who played for Luton Town, Nuneaton Borough, Oxford United, Torquay United and Bristol Rovers. He is a Players Services Executive at the Professional Footballers' Association.

== Career ==
Mansell was born in Gloucester and began his career as a trainee with Luton Town, turning professional with the Hatters in August 2000. He made his first-team debut on 17 January 2001 in a 2–1 defeat away to Queens Park Rangers in an FA Cup 3rd Round Replay, with his league debut coming 6 days later in a 2–0 defeat away to Oldham Athletic.

He had a spell on loan with Nuneaton Borough in March 2003, scoring twice in five games. He returned to Luton, but was released at the end of the 2004–05 season, having scored 8 times in 47 league games. He moved to Oxford United in June 2005, and played 44 times the following season as Oxford were relegated to the Conference.

=== Torquay United ===
He was transferred to Torquay United, one of the sides to survive at Oxford's expense on the last day of the previous season, on 5 July 2006 for an undisclosed fee. He was a regular in Torquay's side in the 2006–07 season but, for a second season in a row, the side he played for was relegated to the Conference National.

Mansell was Torquay's captain, and most-capped player ahead of defender Chris Robertson. He was awarded the captaincy in 2010, after Nicky Wroe was dropped for inconsistency and subsequently moved to Shrewsbury Town on 31 January 2011.

He made an excellent start to the 2011–12 season, scoring on the opening day at Plainmoor to rescue a point against Burton Albion on 6 August 2011 before scoring again in a midweek League Cup tie against Southampton, netting Torquay's consolation in a 4–1 loss.

Upon his departure from the club in 2014, Mansell had made 381 appearances in all competitions for Torquay United, placing him sixth on Torquay United all-time appearance list.

=== Bristol Rovers ===
On 26 June 2014 Lee signed a two-year deal at Bristol Rovers, turning down a one-year deal with Torquay United.

Mansell made his competitive debut for Bristol Rovers in a goalless draw against Grimsby Town on 9 August 2014, Rovers' first game in the Conference Premier. He scored his first goal for the club on 16 August 2014, in a 2–1 defeat away against Altrincham. Despite a difficult start to the season, in which the club picked up just eight points from the first seven games, Rovers finished second behind Barnet by one point. After beating Forest Green Rovers in the semi-final, Rovers faced a repeat of their opening day fixture with Grimsby Town. Mansell scored the winning penalty in a 5–3 shootout victory at Wembley Stadium on 17 May 2015 as Bristol Rovers returned to the Football League after a one-season absence.

After scoring the winning penalty, the following season Lee went onto score 2 goals in 29 appearances as Bristol Rovers achieved a second successive promotion with a 92nd-minute winner scored by Lee Brown against Dagenham & Redbridge. On 14 June 2016 Lee signed a new deal to remain with the club.

Mansell's third season at the club saw him limited to just 10 appearances in all competitions. Manager Darrell Clarke revealed that Mansell would not be offered a new contract at the end of the season but would be offered the new role of Professional Development Phase Coach working within the club's academy, an offer Mansell indicated he would accept and confirmed his retirement from the professional game in an interview BBC Radio Bristol. After 4 seasons in this role, Mansell left Bristol Rovers at the end of the 2020–21 season.

== Career statistics ==
Club	Season	Division	League		FA Cup		League Cup		Other		Total	
Club	Season	Division	Apps	Goals	Apps	Goals	Apps	Goals	Apps	Goals	Apps	Goals
Luton Town	2000–01	Division Two	18	5	1	1	0	0	0	0	19	6
Luton Town	2001–02	Division Three	11	1	0	0	1	0	1 (Note: Appearance(s) in Football League Trophy)	0	13	1
Luton Town	2002–03	Division Two	1	0	0	0	0	0	2	0	3	0
Luton Town	2003–04	Division Two	16	2	5	1	0	0	3	0	24	3
Luton Town	2004–05	League One	1	0	0	0	1	0	1	0	3	0
Total			47	8	6	2	2	0	7	0	62	10
→ Nuneaton Borough (loan)	2002–03	Conference	5	2	0	0	0	0	0	0	5	2
Total			5	2	0	0	0	0	0	0	5	2
Oxford United	2005–06	League Two	44	1	4	0	1	0	2	1	51	2
Total			44	1	4	0	1	0	2	1	51	2
Torquay United	2006–07	League Two	45	4	4	0	1	0	1	0	51	4
Torquay United	2007–08	Conference Premier	36	1	2	0	0	0	3 (Note: Appearance(s) in FA Trophy)	0	41	1
Torquay United	2008–09	Conference Premier	44	0	4	0	0	0	1	0	49	0
Torquay United	2009–10	League Two	39	2	3	0	0	0	1	0	43	2
Torquay United	2010–11	League Two	45	0	4	0	1	0	5 (Note: 2 appearance(s) in Football League Trophy) (Note: 3 appearance(s) in League Two play-offs)	0	55	0
Torquay United	2011–12	League Two	45	12	2	0	1	1	3 (Note: 1 appearance(s) in Football League Trophy) (Note: 2 appearance(s) in League Two play-offs)	0	51	13
Torquay United	2012–13	League Two	42	2	1	0	1	0	1	0	45	2
Torquay United	2013–14	League Two	43	2	1	0	1	0	1	0	46	2
Total			339	23	21	0	5	1	16	0	381	24
Bristol Rovers	2014–15	Conference Premier	44	5	1	0	0	0	3 (Note: Appearance(s) in Conference play-offs)	0	48	5
Bristol Rovers	2015–16	League Two	28	2	1	0	0	0	0	0	29	2
Bristol Rovers	2016–17	League Two	9	0	0	0	0	0	1	0	10	0
Total			81	7	2	0	0	0	4	0	87	7
Career total			516	41	33	2	8	1	29	1	586	45

== Coaching career ==
On 25 September 2021, Mansell was appointed interim manager of National League North club Gloucester City following the sacking of Paul Groves. On 13 November, Mansell picked up his first win as manager as Bristol Rovers loanee Ollie Hulbert, whom had worked closely with Mansell in the Development Squad at Rovers, scored a double as Gloucester defeated Farsley Celtic 2–0. After the match, Mansell was given the job until the end of the 2021–22 season. Mansell was sacked by the club on 29 September 2022 with Gloucester sitting in 15th position after ten matches.

== Post-playing career ==
In February 2023, Mansell was appointed as a Players Services Executive at the Professional Footballers' Association.

== Honours ==
Individual

- PFA Team of the Year: 2011–12 League Two
- Conference Premier Team of the Year: 2014–15
