= 2012–13 Bristol Rovers F.C. season =

Bristol Rovers
2012–13 season
- Chairman: Nick Higgs
- Manager: Mark McGhee (until 15 December); John Ward (from 17 December)
- Stadium: Memorial Stadium
- League Two: 14th
- FA Cup: First round (Eliminated by Sheffield United)
- League Cup: First round (Eliminated by Ipswich Town)
- Football League Trophy: First round (Eliminated by Yeovil Town)
- Top goalscorer: League: Tom Eaves (7 goals); All: Tom Eaves & David Clarkson (7 goals each)
- Highest home attendance: 8,646 (vs. Rotherham United, 19 February 2013)
- Lowest home attendance: 2,810 (vs. Yeovil Town, 4 September 2012)
- Average home league attendance: 6,105
Home colours	Away colours

The 2012–13 season was the 130th season in Bristol Rovers' history and their 86th in the Football League. Rovers once again competed in League Two, the lowest level of the Football League, after finishing 13th in the 2011–12 season.

Bristol Rovers met Fleetwood Town for the first time in their history after their promotion from the Conference National. They also played at Rotherham United's New York Stadium and Chesterfield's Proact Stadium for the first time.

Having been bottom of League Two and real contenders to be relegated out of The Football League at the midway point in the season, they went on to win 12 of the final 23 games to steer well clear of the relegation zone and even, briefly, became contenders to reach the play-offs. In the end, Rovers finished 14th, nine points from both the play-offs and relegation zone. The upturn in form coincided with the return of John Ward to the managerial position at Rovers, replacing Mark McGhee who was sacked in December.

== Season events ==
=== May ===
- 2 May 2012 – Goalkeeper Conor Gough joined Rovers from Charlton Athletic on a two-year contract.
- 4 May 2012 – Ellis Harrison, Mitch Harding, Jordan Goddard and Ross Staley were all awarded professional contracts.
- 13 May 2012 – Defender Gary Sawyer signed a two-year contract with League One side Leyton Orient after rejecting Rovers' offer of a new deal.
- 17 May 2012 – Rovers announced that 10 players would be released upon completion of their contracts at the end of June. Among them was Byron Anthony who had been with the club since 2006.
- 22 May 2012 – Jim Paterson agreed a new one-year deal at Rovers.

=== June ===
- 6 June 2012 – Danny Woodards verbally agreed a new contract with Rovers.
- 18 June 2012 – Young winger Shaquille Hunter agreed to sign his first professional contract with Bristol Rovers despite rumoured interest from Manchester City, Liverpool and Fulham.

=== July ===
- 2 July 2012 – Craig Stanley's contract at Rovers was terminated by mutual consent.
- 3 July 2012 – Goalkeeping coach Carl Emberson left for Luton Town joining up with former boss Paul Buckle as assistant manager.
- 4 July 2012 – Midfielder Oliver Norburn rejoins Rovers, signing a one-year contract. Wayne Brown signed a new six-month contract.
- 5 July 2012 – Northern Ireland Under-21 international Seanan Clucas signed for Rovers on a one-year contract.
- 16 July 2012 – Youth Team Coach Jamie Fullarton left Rovers to take up a youth coaching role at Crystal Palace.
- 18 July 2012 – Defender Lee Brown signed a contract extension that would keep him at the club until 2014.
- 19 July 2012 – Planning permission for Rovers' proposed 21,700 all seater stadium in Frenchay was approved by South Gloucestershire Council with councillors voting 11 to 1 in favour.
- 21 July 2012 – Former Rovers striker Marcus Stewart rejoined the club as Youth Development Coach.
- 26 July 2012 – Stoke City midfielder Matthew Lund rejoined Rovers on a six-month loan deal.
- 27 July 2012 – Rovers agree to sign Faroese international defender Rógvi Baldvinsson from Ålgård FK for an undisclosed fee. Former Bristol City striker David Clarkson agreed a two-year deal with Rovers.
- 30 July 2012 – Scotland international defender Garry Kenneth agreed a three-year deal with Rovers.

=== August ===
- 1 August 2012 – Winger Mustapha Carayol left for Championship side Middlesbrough for an undisclosed fee believed to be around £300,000.
- 2 August 2012 – Chris Zebroski left Rovers after one season, joining fellow League Two side Cheltenham Town.
- 11 August 2012 – Rógvi Baldvinsson announced that he was to return to Norway and not joining Rovers, citing personal reasons.
- 12 August 2012 – German midfielder Fabian Broghammer signed for Rovers after playing a number of pre-season games while on trial.
- 14 August 2012 – Chelsea goalkeeper Sam Walker joined on loan until January. Rovers are knocked out of the League Cup in the first round by Ipswich Town.
- 20 August 2012 – Rovers agreed the permanent signing of defender Tom Parkes from Leicester City.
- 23 August 2012 – Former England goalkeeper Dave Beasant joined Rovers as part-time goalkeeping coach.
- 30 August 2012 – Rovers submit an official complaint to the Football League over the circumstances which led to the match with Wycombe Wanderers being abandoned after 66 minutes with Rovers leading 3–1.
- 31 August 2012 – Defender Cian Bolger joined Rovers on loan until January from Leicester City. Bolger had previously played for Rovers on loan in the past two seasons.

=== September ===
- 4 September 2012 – Yeovil Town knock Rovers out of the Football League Trophy in the first round.
- 20 September 2012 – Fulham goalkeeper Neil Etheridge joins Rovers on a one-month loan deal.
- 27 September 2012 – Striker Tom Eaves joins Rovers on loan from Bolton Wanderers for three months. Former Scotland international Derek Riordan signed on a short-term deal until Christmas. Riordan is currently on bail and is due to go on trial on 9 October over an alleged assault in an Edinburgh nightclub.

=== October ===
- 1 October 2012 – Midfielder Jordan Goddard and forward Mitch Harding join Gloucester City on loan for one month.
- 23 October 2012 – Neil Etheridge's loan from Fulham was extended to 20 December.
- 30 October 2012 – Jordan Goddard & Mitch Harding extend their loan deals with Gloucester City for another month.

=== November ===
- 1 November 2012 – Tom Curtis is appointed Director of the Youth Academy at Rovers, leaving his job as head coach of the Antigua and Barbuda national team in the process.
- 4 November 2012 – Sheffield United come from behind to beat Rovers 2–1 in the FA Cup first round. The result meant that Rovers had failed to win a single cup game this season. However, all three cup matches were against higher division sides.
- 21 November 2012 – On loan goalkeeper Neil Etheridge was recalled by parent club Fulham.
- 22 November 2012 – Guy Branston joined on a month-long loan deal from Aldershot Town.

=== December ===
- 13 December 2012 – Midfielder Wayne Brown rejected a contract extension, opting to re-join Finnish side TPS.
- 15 December 2012 – Manager Mark McGhee was relieved of his duties following the 4–1 away defeat to York City. It followed a run of 10 games with only one win and one draw leaving the club 23rd in League Two.
- 17 December 2012 – Former Bristol City, Cheltenham Town, Carlisle United and Colchester United manager John Ward was appointed Bristol Rovers manager for the second time, initially until the end of the season with a view to a contract extension upon its completion. His first spell in charge was between 1993 and 1996 and included a trip to Wembley Stadium in the 1995 Second Division Play-Off Final.
- 27 December 2012 – Derek Riordan was officially released by Rovers on completion of his contract after new manager John Ward confirmed he had returned to Scotland on Christmas Eve.
- 31 December 2012 – Rovers agreed one-month loan deals with Queens Park Rangers and Colchester United for Tom Hitchcock and John-Joe O'Toole starting 1 January. Rovers also signed goalkeeper Steve Mildenhall from Millwall on an emergency loan which would be extended "as soon as possible".

=== January ===
- 3 January 2013 – Defender Mark McChrystal joined on a short-term deal from Tranmere Rovers after having a bid for Cian Bolger turned down by Leicester City.
- 16 January 2013 – Plans to build a Sainsbury's store on the Memorial Stadium site were approved. This allowed Rovers to proceed with plans to build the proposed UWE Stadium.
- 21 January 2013 – Port Vale defender Clayton McDonald joined on an emergency loan.
- 23 January 2013 – Stoke City forward Ryan Brunt joined Rovers on a two-and-a-half-year deal.

=== February ===
- 15 February 2013 – Defender Tom Parkes was named League Two Player of the Month for January by the Football League. Manager John Ward was nominated for January's League Two Manager of the Month but lost out to Martin Allen manager of Gillingham, the only side to score any points against Rovers in January.
- 28 February 2013 – French striker Oumare Tounkara signed for Rovers on a deal until the end of the season.

=== March ===
- 28 March 2013 – Stuart Naylor was appointed new full-time goalkeeping coach until the end of the season, replacing Dave Beasant who was previously in the role part-time.

=== April ===
- 16 April 2013 – Defender Michael Smith signed a new two-year deal with Rovers.
- 17 April 2013 – Striker Matt Harrold agreed a new one-year deal at Rovers with the option of a further year extension.
- 19 April 2013 – John Ward agreed to a new one year rolling contract. Eurocams were announced as new home shirt sponsors and Highspec Travel Services as new away shirt sponsors. Second year scholars Josh Southway and Pat Keary signed one year contracts while first year scholar Jamie Lucas signed a two-year contract.
- 23 April 2013 – Assistant manager Shaun North left Rovers with immediate effect, development coach Marcus Stewart took over the role for the final game of the season. Alefein Santos signed his first professional deal with Rovers.
- 25 April 2013 – Jim Paterson signed a one-year contract extension having triggered a clause in his previous contract.
- 27 April 2013 – Rovers finish the season in 14th place on 60 points.
- 29 April 2013 – It was confirmed that winger Joe Anyinsah would be released upon completion of his contract.
- 30 April 2013 – Defender Mark McChrystal agreed a two-year contract with Rovers.

== First team ==
As of 27 April 2013.

No.	Name	Nationality	Age	Club apps.	Club goals	Int. caps	Int. goals	Previous club	Notes
Goalkeepers
1	Scott Bevan	(England)	33	37	0	0	0	Torquay United	
20	Conor Gough	(England)	19	2	0	0	0	Charlton Athletic	
Defenders
2	Michael Smith	(Northern Ireland)	24	58	1	0	0	Ballymena United	
3	Jim Paterson	(Scotland)	33	43	1	0	0	Shamrock Rovers	
4	Danny Woodards	(England)	29	61	3	0	0	Milton Keynes Dons	
5	Garry Kenneth	(Scotland)	26	18	1	2	0	Dundee United	Vice Captain
6	Tom Parkes	(England)	21	54	1	0	0	Leicester City	Vice Captain
14	Lee Brown	(England)	22	81	10	0	0	Queens Park Rangers	
19	Adam Virgo	(England)	30	19	1	0	0	Yeovil Town	Vice Captain
29	Mark McChrystal	(Northern Ireland)	29	21	0	0	0	Tranmere Rovers	
30	Tom Lockyer	(England)	18	4	0	0	0	Youth team graduate	
Midfielders
8	Matt Gill	(England)	32	44	0	0	0	Norwich City	Club Captain
11	Fabian Broghammer	(Germany)	23	36	3	0	0	FC Bayern Alzenau	
15	Oliver Norburn	(England)	20	40	3	0	0	Leicester City	
16	Joe Anyinsah	(England)	28	62	8	0	0	Charlton Athletic	
22	Ross Staley	(England)	19	0	0	0	0	Youth team graduate	
23	Jordan Goddard	(England)	20	0	0	0	0	Youth team graduate	
24	Ollie Clarke	(England)	21	6	0	0	0	Youth team graduate	
25	Seanan Clucas	(Northern Ireland)	20	19	0	0	0	Preston North End	
31	Shaquille Hunter	(England)	17	0	0	0	0	Youth team graduate	
33	Alefein Santos	(Brazil)	18	1	0	0	0	Youth team graduate	
Forwards
7	David Clarkson	(Scotland)	27	26	6	2	1	Bristol City	
9	Matt Harrold	(England)	28	46	18	0	0	Shrewsbury Town	
10	Eliot Richards	(Wales)	21	90	14	0	0	Youth team graduate	
17	Ellis Harrison	(Wales)	33	14	3	0	0	Youth team graduate	
18	Mitch Harding	(England)	19	6	0	0	0	Youth team graduate	
26	Ryan Brunt	(England)	20	18	5	0	0	Stoke City	
34	Oumare Tounkara	(France)	23	9	2	0	0	Red Star	

=== Transfers ===
==== In ====
Date	Player	Position	Transferred from	Fee
1 July 2012	Conor Gough	GK	Charlton Athletic	Free
4 July 2012	Oliver Norburn	MF	Leicester City	Free
5 July 2012	Seanan Clucas	MF	Preston North End	Free
26 July 2012	Matthew Lund	MF	Stoke City	Loan
27 July 2012	David Clarkson	FW	Bristol City	Free
30 July 2012	Garry Kenneth	DF	Dundee United	Free
12 August 2012	Fabian Broghammer	MF	FC Bayern Alzenau	Free
14 August 2012	Sam Walker	GK	Chelsea	Loan
20 August 2012	Tom Parkes	DF	Leicester City	Undisclosed
31 August 2012	Cian Bolger	DF	Leicester City	Loan
20 September 2012	Neil Etheridge	GK	Fulham	Loan
27 September 2012	Tom Eaves	FW	Bolton Wanderers	Loan
27 September 2012	Derek Riordan	FW	St Johnstone	Free
22 November 2012	Guy Branston	DF	Aldershot Town	Loan
1 January 2013	Tom Hitchcock	FW	Queens Park Rangers	Loan
1 January 2013	John-Joe O'Toole	MF	Colchester United	Loan
1 January 2013	Steve Mildenhall	GK	Millwall	Loan
3 January 2013	Mark McChrystal	DF	Tranmere Rovers	Free
21 January 2013	Clayton McDonald	DF	Port Vale	Loan
23 January 2013	Ryan Brunt	FW	Stoke City	Free
28 February 2013	Oumare Tounkara	FW	Red Star	Free

==== Out ====
Date	Player	Position	Transferred to	Fee
30 June 2012	Gary Sawyer	DF	Leyton Orient	Free
30 June 2012	Byron Anthony	DF	Hereford United	Free
30 June 2012	Scott McGleish	FW	Whitehawk	Free
30 June 2012	Charlie Reece	MF	Worcester City	Free
30 June 2012	Charlie Clough	DF	Dorchester Town	Free
30 June 2012	Lance Cronin	GK	Macclesfield Town	Free
30 June 2012	Michael Boateng	DF	Bromley	Free
30 June 2012	Kayne McLaggon	FW	Weston-super-Mare	Free
30 June 2012	Darren Jefferies	MF	Frome Town	Free
30 June 2012	Lamar Powell	FW	Bath City	Free
30 June 2012	James Dale	MF		Released
2 July 2012	Craig Stanley	MF	Aldershot Town	Free
1 August 2012	Mustapha Carayol	MF	Middlesbrough	Undisclosed
2 August 2012	Chris Zebroski	FW	Cheltenham Town	Undisclosed
1 October 2012	Mitch Harding	FW	Gloucester City	Loan
1 October 2012	Jordan Goddard	MF	Gloucester City	Loan
27 December 2012	Derek Riordan	FW		Released
1 January 2013	Wayne Brown	MF	Turun Palloseura	Free

== Squad statistics ==
=== Appearances, goals and cards ===
As of 27 April 2013

No.	Pos.	Name	League		FA Cup		League Cup		League Trophy		Total		Discipline	
No.	Pos.	Name	Apps	Goals	Apps	Goals	Apps	Goals	Apps	Goals	Apps	Goals	Yellow card	Red card
2	DF	(Northern Ireland) Michael Smith	38	1	1	0	1	1	1	0	41	2	4	0
3	DF	(Scotland) Jim Paterson	26	0	1	0	1	0	1	0	29	0	2	0
4	DF	(England) Danny Woodards	22	2	0	0	0	0	0	0	22	2	2	0
5	DF	(Scotland) Garry Kenneth	18	1	1	0	0	0	0	0	19	1	4	1
6	DF	(England) Tom Parkes	40	1	0	0	0	0	1	0	41	1	12	1
7	FW	(Scotland) David Clarkson	26	6	1	1	1	0	1	0	29	7	2	0
8	MF	(England) Matthew Gill	11	0	0	0	1	0	1	0	13	0	2	0
9	FW	(England) Matt Harrold	6	2	0	0	1	0	0	0	7	2	1	0
10	FW	(Wales) Eliot Richards	40	6	1	0	0	0	1	0	42	6	4	1
11	MF	(Germany) Fabian Broghammer	36	3	1	0	0	0	1	0	38	3	2	0
14	DF	(England) Lee Brown	39	3	1	0	1	0	1	0	42	3	2	0
15	MF	(England) Oliver Norburn	35	3	1	0	1	0	0	0	37	3	3	1
16	MF	(England) Joe Anyinsah	31	4	0	0	1	0	0	0	32	4	3	0
17	FW	(Wales) Ellis Harrison	13	3	0	0	0	0	0	0	13	3	3	0
18	FW	(England) Mitch Harding	5	0	0	0	0	0	0	0	5	0	0	0
19	DF	(Scotland) Adam Virgo	10	0	0	0	1	0	1	0	12	0	2	0
20	GK	(England) Conor Gough	1	0	0	0	0	0	0	0	1	0	0	0
24	MF	(England) Ollie Clarke	5	0	0	0	1	0	0	0	6	0	0	0
25	MF	(Northern Ireland) Seanan Clucas	19	0	1	0	1	0	0	0	21	0	4	0
26	FW	(England) Ryan Brunt	18	5	0	0	0	0	0	0	18	5	4	0
29	DF	(Northern Ireland) Mark McChrystal	21	0	0	0	0	0	0	0	21	0	0	0
30	DF	(England) Tom Lockyer	4	0	0	0	0	0	0	0	4	0	0	0
33	MF	(Brazil) Alefein Santos	1	0	0	0	0	0	0	0	1	0	0	0
34	FW	(France) Oumare Tounkara	9	2	0	0	0	0	0	0	9	2	1	0
Players to have appeared for Bristol Rovers who have left:
—	GK	(Philippines) Neil Etheridge	12	0	0	0	0	0	0	0	12	0	0	0
—	FW	(Scotland) Derek Riordan	11	0	1	0	0	0	0	0	12	0	0	0
—	FW	(England) Tom Eaves	16	7	1	0	0	0	0	0	17	7	1	0
—	DF	(England) Guy Branston	4	1	0	0	0	0	0	0	4	1	0	0
—	MF	(England) Wayne Brown	18	0	1	0	1	0	1	0	21	0	2	1
—	MF	(Northern Ireland) Matthew Lund	18	2	1	0	1	0	0	0	20	2	6	1
—	DF	(Republic of Ireland) Cian Bolger	3	0	0	0	0	0	1	0	4	0	1	0
—	GK	(England) Sam Walker	11	0	1	0	1	0	1	0	14	0	0	0
—	MF	(Republic of Ireland) John-Joe O'Toole	18	3	0	0	0	0	0	0	18	3	6	0
—	DF	(England) Clayton McDonald	6	0	0	0	0	0	0	0	6	0	0	0
—	GK	(England) Steve Mildenhall	22	0	0	0	0	0	0	0	22	0	0	0
—	FW	(England) Tom Hitchcock	17	3	0	0	0	0	0	0	17	3	3	0

=== Top scorers ===
Name	League	FA Cup	League Cup	League Trophy	Total
Tom Eaves	7	0	0	0	7
David Clarkson	6	1	0	0	7
Eliot Richards	6	0	0	0	6
Ryan Brunt	5	0	0	0	5
Joe Anyinsah	4	0	0	0	4
Fabian Broghammer	3	0	0	0	3
Oliver Norburn	3	0	0	0	3
Lee Brown	3	0	0	0	3
Ellis Harrison	3	0	0	0	3
John-Joe O'Toole	3	0	0	0	3
Tom Hitchcock	3	0	0	0	3
Michael Smith	1	0	1	0	2
Matthew Lund	2	0	0	0	2
Danny Woodards	2	0	0	0	2
Oumare Tounkara	2	0	0	0	2
Matt Harrold	2	0	0	0	2
Guy Branston	1	0	0	0	1
Garry Kenneth	1	0	0	0	1
Tom Parkes	1	0	0	0	1

Updated to games played on 27 April 2013.

Source: Soccerbase

Apps = Appearances made; Goals = Goals scored.

=== End-of-season awards ===
Player of the Year	Young Player of the Year	Youth Team Player of the Year	Goal of the Season	Clubman of the Year
Michael Smith	Tom Parkes	Matt Macey	Oliver Norburn vs. Cheltenham Town	John Ward

== Competitions ==
=== Overall ===
Competition	Started round	Final position / round	First match	Last match
League Two	—	14th	18 August 2012	27 April 2013
League Cup	1st round	1st round	14 August 2012	14 August 2012
Football League Trophy	1st round	1st round	4 September 2012	4 September 2012
FA Cup	1st round	1st round	3 November	3 November

Updated to match played 27 April 2013
Source: Competitions

=== League Two ===
==== Standings ====
Pos	Team	Pld	W	D	L	GF	GA	GD	Pts
12	Rochdale	46	16	13	17	68	70	−2	61
13	Fleetwood Town	46	15	15	16	55	57	−2	60
14	Bristol Rovers	46	16	12	18	60	69	−9	60
15	Wycombe Wanderers	46	17	9	20	50	60	−10	60
16	Morecambe	46	15	13	18	55	61	−6	58

Updated to match(es) played on 27 April 2013. Source: BBC Sport
Rules for classification: 1) Points; 2) Goal difference; 3) Number of goals scored

==== Results summary ====
Overall								Home						Away					
Pld	W	D	L	GF	GA	GD	Pts	W	D	L	GF	GA	GD	W	D	L	GF	GA	GD
46	16	12	18	60	70	−10	60	11	4	8	32	28	+4	5	8	10	28	42	−14

Last updated: 27 April 2013.

==== Results by round ====
Round	1	2	3	4	5	6	7	8	9	10	11	12	13	14	15	16	17	18	19	20	21	22	23	24	25	26	27	28	29	30	31	32	33	34	35	36	37	38	39	40	41	42	43	44	45	46
Ground	H	A	H	H	A	A	H	A	H	H	A	H	A	A	H	H	A	A	H	A	H	A	A	H	H	A	A	H	A	A	H	H	A	A	H	H	A	H	H	H	A	H	A	A	H	A
Result	L	D	L	D	L	D	D	W	L	W	D	W	L	L	L	W	L	L	D	L	L	L	D	W	L	W	W	W	D	W	W	L	D	L	W	W	L	W	W	D	W	W	L	D	L	D
Position	19	20	23	23	23	23	23	21	21	20	21	20	20	20	20	20	21	21	21	22	23	23	24	23	24	24	23	19	19	19	18	18	18	18	17	15	17	15	14	14	13	11	11	12	13	14

Updated to match(es) played on 27 April 2013. Source:
A = Away; H = Home; W = Win; D = Draw; L = Loss

=== Scores Overview ===
Bristol Rovers score given first.

Opposition	Home Score	Away Score	Double
Accrington Stanley	0–1	0–1	0–2
AFC Wimbledon	1–0	1–3	2–3
Aldershot Town	2–2	2–2	4–4
Barnet	2–1	1–1	3–2
Bradford City	3–3	1–4	4–7
Burton Albion	3–0	1–1	4–1
Cheltenham Town	0–1	1–1	1–2
Chesterfield	3–2	0–2	3–4
Dagenham & Redbridge	0–1	4–2	4–3
Exeter City	2–0	2–1	4–1
Fleetwood Town	0–0	3–0	3–0
Gillingham	0–2	0–4	0–6
Morecambe	0–3	1–1	1–4
Northampton Town	3–1	0–1	3–2
Oxford United	0–2	2–0	2–2
Plymouth Argyle	2–1	1–1	3–2
Port Vale	2–0	0–4	2–4
Rochdale	2–1	1–2	3–3
Rotherham United	1–2	3–1	4–3
Southend United	2–3	0–0	2–3
Torquay United	3–2	3–3	6–5
Wycombe Wanderers	1–0	0–2	1–2
York City	0–0	1–4	1–4

== Matches ==
Won Drawn Lost Postponed

=== Preseason friendlies ===
14 July 2012	Royal Marines	0–3	Bristol Rovers	Endurance Park
15:00		Report	Harrold 28' (pen.); Anyinsah 63'; Zebroski 74'

21 July 2012	Weston-super-Mare	2–2	Bristol Rovers XI	Woodspring Stadium
15:00	Price; Young	Report	Virgo; Clarkson

21 July 2012	Frome Town	1–0	Bristol Rovers	Badger's Hill
15:00	Baker 87'	Report		Attendance: 450

24 July 2012	Newport County	2–0	Bristol Rovers	Rodney Parade
19:45	Louis 29'; Fielden 86'	Report		Attendance: 1,549

28 July 2012	Yeovil Town	1–1	Bristol Rovers	Huish Park
12:00	Ince 79'	Report	Norburn 83'	Attendance: 1,125

31 July 2012	Tamworth	1–2	Bristol Rovers	The Lamb Ground
19:45	Barrow 18'	Report	Richards 79'; Hunter 88'	Attendance: 495

1 August 2012	Paulton Rovers	1–2	Bristol Rovers	Athletic Field
19:30	Lacey 8'	Report	W. Brown 22'; Harrold 50'	Attendance: 553

4 August 2012	Bristol City	3–0	Bristol Rovers	Ashton Gate Stadium
13:00	Woolford 22'; Adomah 80'; Pearson 85'	Report		Attendance: 8,713

8 August 2012	Gloucester City	2–0	Bristol Rovers	Whaddon Road
19:45	Morford 17'; Davies 58'	Report		Attendance: 276

11 August 2012	Bristol Rovers	1–2	Coventry City	Memorial Stadium
15:00	Harrold 42'	Report	McDonald 25', 49'	Attendance: 1,775

=== League Two ===
==== August ====
18 August 2012	Bristol Rovers	0–2	Oxford United	Memorial Stadium
15:00		Report	Forster-Caskey 22'; Potter 32'	Attendance: 7,451; Referee: Dean Mohareb

21 August 2012	Barnet	1–1	Bristol Rovers	Underhill Stadium
20:00	Holmes 9'	Report	Harrold 55'	Attendance: 1,794; Referee: Steve Bratt

25 August 2012	Wycombe Wanderers	A–A	Bristol Rovers	Adams Park
15:00	Logan 14'	Report; Abandoned after 66 minutes for safety reasons	L. Brown 10'; Richards 34', 36'	Referee: Andy Davies

==== September ====
1 September 2012	Bristol Rovers	0–3	Morecambe	Memorial Stadium
15:00		Report	McDonald 52'; Fenton 57'; Ellison 62'	Attendance: 5,207; Referee: Lee Collins

8 September 2012	Bristol Rovers	2–2	Aldershot Town	Memorial Stadium
15:00	Clarkson 11'; Broghammer 90'	Report	Reid 18'; Rodman 57'	Attendance: 5,117; Referee: Simon Hooper

15 September 2012	Gillingham	4–0	Bristol Rovers	MEMS Priestfield Stadium
15:00	Kedwell 5' (pen.), 15'; Lee 45'; Whelpdale 82'	Report		Attendance: 4,768; Referee: Gary Sutton

18 September 2012	Plymouth Argyle	1–1	Bristol Rovers	Home Park
19:45	Hourihane 35'	Report	Parkes 70'	Attendance: 6,303; Referee: Darren Deadman

22 September 2012	Bristol Rovers	0–0	Fleetwood Town	Memorial Stadium
15:00		Report		Attendance: 5,079; Referee: Steve Martin

29 September 2012	Exeter City	1–2	Bristol Rovers	St James Park
15:00	Cureton 66'	Report	Clarkson 5'; Richards 69'	Attendance: 5,054; Referee: Keith Stroud

==== October ====
3 October 2012	Bristol Rovers	0–1	Cheltenham Town	Memorial Stadium
19:45		Report	Zebroski 39'	Attendance: 5,747; Referee: Oliver Langford

6 October 2012	Bristol Rovers	3–1	Northampton Town	Memorial Stadium
15:00	Eaves 53'; Kenneth 57'; Norburn 84'	Report	Charles (red card) 24'; Akinfenwa 75'	Attendance: 5,166; Referee: Mark Brown

13 October 2012	Burton Albion	1–1	Bristol Rovers	Pirelli Stadium
15:00	Kee 50'	Report	Clarkson 30'	Attendance: 2,961; Referee: Jeremy Simpson

20 October 2012	Bristol Rovers	3–2	Torquay United	Memorial Stadium
15:00	Eaves 15', 76'; Lund 17'	Report	Oastler (yellow card) 21' (yellow-red card) 30'; Howe 53'; Downes 59'	Attendance: 6,331; Referee: Scott Mathieson

23 October 2012	AFC Wimbledon	3–1	Bristol Rovers	Cherry Red Records Stadium
19:45	Kenneth 20' (o.g.); Yussuff 29'; Antwi 33'	Report	Eaves 73'; Parkes (yellow card) 32' (yellow-red card) 83'	Attendance: 3,714; Referee: Pat Miller

27 October 2012	Accrington Stanley	1–0	Bristol Rovers	The Crown Ground
15:00	Amond 79'	Report		Attendance: 1,462; Referee: Rob Lewis

==== November ====
6 November 2012	Bristol Rovers	2–3	Southend United	Memorial Stadium
19:45	Broghammer 10'; Clarkson 85' (pen.); Norburn (red card) 88'	Report	Tomlin 40'; Hurst 44'; Cresswell 64'	Attendance: 4,721; Referee: Darren Drysdale

10 November 2012	Bristol Rovers	3–2	Chesterfield	Memorial Stadium
15:00	Togwell 5' (o.g.); Anyinsah 59'; Eaves 80'	Report	Randall 20'; Dickenson 65'	Attendance: 5,491; Referee: Richard Clark

17 November 2012	Rochdale	2–1	Bristol Rovers	Spotland Stadium
15:00	Tutte 27'; Grant 59'	Report	Clarkson 14' (pen.); Kenneth (yellow card) 28' (yellow-red card) 71'; Richards (red card) 90+4'	Attendance: 2,204; Referee: Scott Duncan

20 November 2012	Port Vale	4–0	Bristol Rovers	Vale Park
19:45	Pope 20', 22', 67'; Williamson 35'	Report		Attendance: 4,177; Referee: Andrew Madley

24 November 2012	Bristol Rovers	3–3	Bradford City	Memorial Stadium
15:00	Branston 2'; Eaves 33'; Smith 62'; W. Brown (yellow card) 53' (yellow-red card) 90+7'	Report	Wells 28'; McHugh 55'; Hanson 68'; Doyle (red card) 90+6'	Attendance: 5,092; Referee: David Phillips

==== December ====
1 December 2012	Wycombe Wanderers	2–0	Bristol Rovers	Adams Park
15:00	Grant 11'; Ainsworth 55'	Report	Lund (yellow card) 39' (yellow-red card) 90+4'	Attendance: 3,740; Referee: David Coote

8 December 2012	Bristol Rovers	0–1	Dagenham & Redbridge	Memorial Stadium
15:00		Report	Williams 19'	Attendance: 4,874; Referee: Steve Rushton

15 December 2012	York City	4–1	Bristol Rovers	Bootham Crescent
15:00	Kenneth 14' (o.g.); Chambers 16', 33'; Walker 19'	Report	Eaves 15'	Attendance: 3,109; Referee: Paul Tierney

22 December 2012	Bristol Rovers	P–P	Rotherham United	Memorial Stadium
15:00		Report; Postponed due to waterlogged pitch		Referee: James Linington

26 December 2012	Aldershot Town	2–2	Bristol Rovers	EBB Stadium
15:00	Hector 33'; Reid 76' (pen.)	Report	Clarkson 54' (pen.); Richards 87'	Attendance: 2,862; Referee: Lee Collins

29 December 2012	Cheltenham Town	P–P	Bristol Rovers	Abbey Business Stadium
15:00		Report; Postponed due to waterlogged pitch		Referee: Bobby Madley

==== January ====
1 January 2013	Bristol Rovers	2–1	Plymouth Argyle	Memorial Stadium
13:00	Anyinsah 19'; Lund 25'	Report	Hourihane 62'	Attendance: 7,332; Referee: Mark Heywood

5 January 2013	Bristol Rovers	0–2	Gillingham	Memorial Stadium
15:00		Report	Whelpdale 3'; Burton 44'	Attendance: 6,088; Referee: Brendan Malone

12 January 2013	Fleetwood Town	0–3	Bristol Rovers	Highbury Stadium
15:00		Report	Woodards 5'; Richards 27'; O'Toole 49'	Attendance: 2,811; Referee: James Adcock

19 January 2013	Bristol Rovers	P–P	Exeter City	Memorial Stadium
15:00		Report; Postponed for safety reasons.		Referee: Graham Scott

26 January 2013	Rotherham United	1–3	Bristol Rovers	New York Stadium
15:00	Davis (yellow card) 9' (yellow-red card) 45+2'; Noble 73'	Report	L. Brown 43' (pen.); Harrison 52'; Anyinsah 61'	Attendance: 6,582; Referee: David Webb

==== February ====
1 February 2013	Bristol Rovers	2–1	Barnet	Memorial Stadium
19:45	Broghammer 78'; Brunt 90+3'	Report	Crawford 90'	Attendance: 8,527; Referee: Trevor Kettle

5 February 2013	Cheltenham Town	1–1	Bristol Rovers	Abbey Business Stadium
19:45	Harrard 45+3'	Report	Norburn 90+5'	Attendance: 4,436; Referee: Dave Phillips

9 February 2013	Oxford United	0–2	Bristol Rovers	Kassam Stadium
15:00		Report	L. Brown 55' (pen.); Richards 90+4'	Attendance: 7,608; Referee: Andrew Madley

16 February 2013	Bristol Rovers	1–0	Wycombe Wanderers	Memorial Stadium
15:00	Brunt 35'	Report		Attendance: 7,324; Referee: Mick Russell

19 February 2013	Bristol Rovers	1–2	Rotherham United	Memorial Stadium
19:45	Anyinsah 81'	Report	Odejayi 60'; Frecklington 62'	Attendance: 8,646; Referee: James Linington

23 February 2013	Morecambe	1–1	Bristol Rovers	Globe Arena
15:00	Redshaw 2'	Report	Richards 48'	Attendance: 1,736; Referee: Carl Berry

26 February 2013	Northampton Town	1–0	Bristol Rovers	Sixfields Stadium
19:45	Harding 88'	Report		Attendance: 4,077; Referee: Gavin Ward

==== March ====
2 March 2013	Bristol Rovers	3–0	Burton Albion	Memorial Stadium
15:00	Brunt 5'; O'Toole 62'; Richards 70'	Report		Attendance: 6,065; Referee: Michael Naylor

6 March 2013	Bristol Rovers	2–0	Exeter City	Memorial Stadium
19:45	Norburn 23'; L. Brown 82'	Report		Attendance: 7,107; Referee: Graham Scott

9 March 2013	Chesterfield	2–0	Bristol Rovers	Proact Stadium
15:00	O'Shea 53'; Gnanduillet 73'	Report		Attendance: 4,814; Referee: Mick Russell

12 March 2013	Bristol Rovers	2–0	Port Vale	Memorial Stadium
19:45	Brunt 7', 38'	Report		Attendance: 5,111; Referee: Fred Graham

16 March 2013	Bristol Rovers	2–1	Rochdale	Memorial Stadium
15:00	Harrison 62', 84'	Report	Rose 75'	Attendance: 6,691; Referee: Darren Sheldrake

23 March 2013	Bradford City	P–P	Bristol Rovers	Coral Windows Stadium
15:00		Report		Referee: Tony Harrington

30 March 2013	Bristol Rovers	0–0	York City	Memorial Stadium
15:00		Report		Attendance: 7,378; Referee: Dean Whitestone

==== April ====
1 April 2013	Dagenham & Redbridge	2–4	Bristol Rovers	London Borough of Barking & Dagenham Stadium
15:00	Strevens 29'; Reed 73'	Report	O'Toole 4'; Tounkara 6', 70'; Woodards 20'	Attendance: 2,082; Referee: Stuart Attwell

6 April 2013	Bristol Rovers	1–0	AFC Wimbledon	Memorial Stadium
15:00	Hitchcock 82'	Report		Attendance: 6,881; Referee: Scott Duncan

9 April 2013	Bradford City	4–1	Bristol Rovers	Coral Windows Stadium
19:45	Wells 6', 22' (pen.); Davies 45+5'; Thompson 57'	Report	Hitchcock 50'	Attendance: 10,621; Referee: Tony Harrington

13 April 2013	Southend United	0–0	Bristol Rovers	Spotland Stadium
15:00		Report		Attendance: 4,612; Referee: Roger East

20 April 2013	Bristol Rovers	0–1	Accrington Stanley	Memorial Stadium
15:00		Report	Molyneux 2'	Attendance: 7,673; Referee: Tim Robinson

27 April 2013	Torquay United	3–3	Bristol Rovers	Plainmoor Stadium
15:00	Benyon 52', 68'; Jarvis 62'	Report	Hitchcock 31'; Jarvis 55' (o.g.); Harrold 90+4'	Attendance: 5,666; Referee: Darren Deadman

=== League Cup ===
14 August 2012 First Round	Ipswich Town	3–1	Bristol Rovers	Portman Road
19:45	Scotland 40'; Smith 56'; Cresswell 84'	Report	M. Smith 26'	Attendance: 8,645; Referee: Fred Graham

=== Football League Trophy ===
4 September 2012 First Round	Bristol Rovers	0–3	Yeovil Town	Memorial Stadium
19:45		Report	Upson 71', 86'; McAllister (red card) 77'; Foley 90+3'	Attendance: 2,810; Referee: Michael Naylor

=== FA Cup ===
3 November 2012 First Round	Bristol Rovers	1–2	Sheffield United	Memorial Stadium
15:00	Clarkson 5'	Report	Blackman 53'; Porter 62'	Attendance: 4,712; Referee: Fred Graham

== See also ==
- 2012–13 in English football
- 2012–13 Football League Two
- List of Bristol Rovers F.C. seasons
