= 2010–11 Charlton Athletic F.C. season =

English Football League One season

Charlton Athletic
2010–11 season
- Manager: Phil Parkinson (until 4 January); Chris Powell (from 14 January)
- Stadium: The Valley
- League One: 13th
- FA Cup: Third round
- League Cup: First round
- Football League Trophy: Second round
- Average home league attendance: 15,582
Home colours	Away colours

During the 2010–11 English football season, Charlton Athletic competed in Football League One. Along with competing in League One, Charlton Athletic also participated in the FA Cup, League Cup and the Football League Trophy. The season covered the period from 1 July 2010 to 30 June 2011.

== Kit ==
Macron were Kit suppliers, with Kent Reliance Building Society being the front of shirt sponsor.

== Results ==
=== League One ===
Win	Draw	Loss

Date	Opponent	Venue	Result F–A	Scorers	Attendance	Referee	Ref.
7 August 2010	Bournemouth	Home	1–0	Sodje 22'	16,236	Hegley	
13 August 2010	Leyton Orient	Away	3–1	McCormack 28', Wagstaff 62', Solly 90+4'	5,535	Linington	
21 August 2010	Oldham Athletic	Home	1–1	Wagstaff 24'	14,842	Shoebridge	
28 August 2010	Huddersfield Town	Away	1–3	Fry 90+2'	13,858	Salisbury	
4 September 2010	Exeter City	Away	0–1		5,743	Phillips	
11 September 2010	Notts County	Home	1–0	Anyinsah 85'	14,436	Tierney	
18 September 2010	Tranmere Rovers	Away	1–1	Wagstaff 6'	4,735	Gibbs	
25 September 2010	Dagenham & Redbridge	Home	2–2	Llera 10', Jackson 90+1'	14,806	Moss	
28 September 2010	Milton Keynes Dons	Home	1–0	Benson 86'	13,155	Waugh	
2 October 2010	Brentford	Away	1–2	Wagstaff 74'	6,342	Penn	
9 October 2010	Plymouth Argyle	Away	2–2	Benson 35', 90'	7,738	Sarginson	
16 October 2010	Brighton & Hove Albion	Home	0–4		18.949	Swarbrick	
23 October 2010	Carlisle United	Away	4–3	Jackson 23' Anyinsah 38' Benson 47', 90+2'	5,624	Mathieson	
30 October 2010	Sheffield Wednesday	Home	1–0	Wagstaff 23'	17,365	East	
2 November 2010	Swindon Town	Away	3–0	Jackson 13', Anyinsah 51', Benson 74'	7,939	Booth	
13 November 2010	Peterborough United	Away	5–1	Jackson 15' pen., 36', Racon 25', Martin 38', 65'	7,477	Foster	
20 November 2010	Yeovil Town	Home	3–2	Jackson 11', 85' pen., Racon 26'	15,184	Whitestone	
23 November 2010	Bristol Rovers	Home	1–1	Benson 77'	13,468	Russell	
12 December 2010	Walsall	Home	0–1		14,938	Pawson	
29 December 2010	Brighton & Hove Albion	Away	1–1	Jackson 3' pen.	8,374	Deadman	
1 January 2011	Colchester United	Away	3–3	Jackson 18' pen., 40' pen., Benson 76'	6,112	Miller	
3 January 2011	Swindon Town	Home	2–4	Jackson 22', Abbott 87'	14,740	Woolmer	
15 January 2011	Sheffield Wednesday	Away	2–2	Wagstaff 4', Jackson 6' pen.	19,051	Boyeson	
22 January 2011	Plymouth Argyle	Home	2–0	Wagstaff 55', Eccleston 90'	16,607	Graham	
1 February 2011	Colchester United	Home	1–0	Wright-Phillips 78'	13,830	Sheldrake	
5 February 2011	Yeovil Town	Away	1–0	Wright-Phillips 63'	4,651	Evans	
12 February 2011	Peterborough United	Home	3–2	Jackson 57', Wright-Phillips 59', Langmead 80' o.g.	15,909	Webb	
15 February 2011	Hartlepool United	Away	1–2	Eccleston 54'	2,289	Rushton	
19 February 2011	Exeter City	Home	1–3	Wright-Phillips 86'	24,767	Tanner	
25 February 2011	Notts County	Away	0–1		8,141	Moss	
1 March 2011	Carlisle United	Home	1–3	Wright-Phillips 10'	12,797	McDermid	
5 March 2011	Tranmere Rovers	Home	1–1	Llera 54'	14,015	Coote	
8 March 2011	Milton Keynes Dons	Away	0–2		7,026	Stroud	
12 March 2011	Brentford	Home	0–1		14,985	Russell	
19 March 2011	Dagenham & Redbridge	Away	1–2	Nouble 90+2'	3,505	Williamson	
22 March 2011	Southampton	Home	1–1	Wright-Phillips 86'	16,550	D'Urso	
26 March 2011	Bournemouth	Away	2–2	Wagstaff 28', Wright-Phillips 81'	7,752	Haywood	
29 March 2011	Rochdale	Away	0–2		2,589	Ilderton	
2 April 2011	Leyton Orient	Home	3–1	Benson 50', Wright-Phillips 73', Semedo 87'	15,875	Hooper	
5 April 2011	Southampton	Away	0–2		20,112	Bates	
9 April 2011	Oldham Athletic	Away	0–0		3,562	Wright	
16 April 2011	Huddersfield Town	Home	0–1		15,879	Langford	
23 April 2011	Bristol Rovers	Away	2–2	Benson 8', Reid 46'	6,586	Lewis	
25 April 2011	Rochdale	Home	3–1	Racon 31', Parrett 52', Eccleston 76'	13,253	Miller	
30 April 2011	Walsall	Away	0–2		5,088	Eltringham	
7 May 2011	Hartlepool United	Home	0–0		15,804	Stroud	

=== FA Cup ===
Win	Draw	Loss

Round	Date	Opponent	Venue	Result F–A	Scorers	Attendance	Referee	Ref.
First round	6 November 2010	Barnet	Away	0–0		2,684	Drysdale	
First round replay	16 November 2010	Barnet	Home	1–0	Reid 18'	4,803	Wright	
Second round	27 November 2010	Luton Town	Home	2–2	Anyinsah 6', Jackson 34'	8,682	Langford	
Second round replay	9 December 2010	Luton Town	Away	3–1	Wagstaff 44', Anyinsah 66', Jackson 80'	5,914	Tanner	
Third round	9 January 2011	Tottenham Hotspur	Away	0–3		35,698	Oliver	

=== League Cup ===
Win	Draw	Loss

Round	Date	Opponent	Venue	Result F–A	Scorers	Attendance	Referee	Ref.
First round	10 August 2010	Shrewsbury Town	Away	3–4	Abbott 25', 28', Martin 32'	3,700	Evans	

=== Football League Trophy ===
Win	Draw	Loss

Round	Date	Opponent	Venue	Result F–A	Scorers	Attendance	Referee	Ref.
First round	31 August 2010	Dagenham & Redbridge	Home	1–0	Racon 57'	4,630	Miller	
Second round	5 October 2010	Milton Keynes Dons	Away	2–1	Abbott 53' Wagstaff 85'	3,773	Kettle	
Third round	9 November 2010	Southend United	Away	1–0	Racon 27'	4,373	Hegley	
Area semi-final	14 December 2010	Brentford	Away	0–0; 1–3 pens.		2,783	Hill	

== Players ==
=== First-team squad ===
Squad at end of season

Note: Flags indicate national team as defined under FIFA eligibility rules; some limited exceptions apply. Players may hold more than one non-FIFA nationality.

No.	Pos.	Nation	Player
1	GK	IRL	Rob Elliot (Note: Elliot was born in Greenwich, England, but also qualified to represent the Republic of Ireland internationally through his father and represented them at under-19 level before making his international debut for the Republic of Ireland in May 2014.)
2	DF	ENG	Simon Francis
3	DF	CAF	Kelly Youga
4	MF	ENG	Johnnie Jackson
5	DF	ESP	Miguel Llera
6	DF	POR	José Semedo
7	MF	ENG	Scott Wagstaff
8	MF	GLP	Therry Racon (Note: Racon was born in Villeneuve-Saint-Georges, France, but also qualified to represent Guadeloupe internationally and made his international debut for Guadeloupe in June 2011.)
9	FW	ENG	Frank Nouble (on loan from West Ham United)
10	FW	ENG	Bradley Wright-Phillips
11	MF	ENG	Kyel Reid
12	DF	IRL	Gary Doherty
14	MF	SCO	Michael Stewart
15	DF	ENG	Yado Mambo
16	MF	IRL	Alan McCormack
17	FW	ENG	Paul Benson
18	MF	CYP	Alex Stavrinou (Note: Stavrinou was born in Harlow, England, but also qualified to represent Cyprus internationally through his father and represented them at U-17 level.)
20	DF	ENG	Chris Solly

No.	Pos.	Nation	Player
21	DF	ARG	Federico Bessone (on loan from Leeds United)
22	MF	ENG	Dean Parrett (on loan from Tottenham Hotspur)
23	MF	ENG	Joe Anyinsah
24	DF	ENG	Jonathan Fortune
25	GK	ENG	Ross Worner
26	MF	ENG	Callum Harriott (Note: Harriott was born in Croydon, England, and represented them at U-19 level, but also qualified to represent Guyana and Jamaica internationally and would make his international debut for Guyana in March 2019.)
27	MF	ENG	Freddie Warren
29	DF	ENG	Jordan Cousins
30	GK	ENG	Conor Gough
31	MF	ENG	Shelby Beema
32	FW	TUR	Tamer Tuna (Note: Tuna was born in Bexley, England, but also qualified to represent Turkey internationally and represented them at U-19 level.)
33	MF	ENG	Lewis Perkins
34	DF	ENG	Carl Jenkinson (Note: Jenkinson was born in Harlow, England, and represented them at U-17 and U-21 level, but also qualified to represent Finland through his mother and represented them at U-19 and U-21 level before making his international debut for England in November 2012.)
36	DF	SCO	Christian Dailly (captain)
38	GK	ENG	John Sullivan (on loan from Millwall)
39	FW	ENG	Nathan Eccleston (on loan from Liverpool)
40	GK	ENG	Brandon Hall

=== Left club during season ===
Note: Flags indicate national team as defined under FIFA eligibility rules; some limited exceptions apply. Players may hold more than one non-FIFA nationality.

No.	Pos.	Nation	Player
9	FW	POL	Pawel Abbott (Note: Abbott was born in York, England, but also qualified to represent Poland internationally through his mother and represented them at U-21 level.) (to Ruch Chorzów)
10	MF	ENG	Lee Martin (on loan from Ipswich Town)
14	FW	ENG	Akpo Sodje (to Hibernian)
19	DF	ENG	Matt Fry (on loan from West Ham United)

No.	Pos.	Nation	Player
21	GK	ENG	Luke Daniels (on loan from West Bromwich Albion)
22	MF	RSA	Bally Smart (to Skonto)
28	DF	NED	Marcel Seip (on loan from Plymouth Argyle)
38	GK	PHI	Neil Etheridge (Note: Etheridge was born in Enfield, England, and represented them at U-16 level, but also qualified to represent the Philippines through his mother and made his international debut for the Philippines in May 2008.) (on loan from Fulham)

== Transfers in ==
=== Summer ===
Date	Position	Name	Club From	Fee
20 May 2010	FW	Akpo Sodje	Sheffield Wednesday	Undisclosed
6 July 2010	DF	Gary Doherty	Norwich City	Free
7 July 2010	MF	Alan McCormack	Southend United	Free
8 July 2010	MF	Johnnie Jackson	Notts County	Undisclosed
19 July 2010	MF	Kyel Reid	Sheffield United	Free
30 July 2010	DF	Simon Francis	Southend United	£35,000
1 August 2010	FW	Pawel Abbott	Oldham Athletic	Nominal
5 August 2010	GK	Ross Worner	Woking	Undisclosed
30 August 2010	FW	Paul Benson	Dagenham & Redbridge	Undisclosed
30 August 2010	FW	Joe Anyinsah	None	Free
31 August 2010	DF	Jonathan Fortune	None	Free

=== Winter ===
Date	Position	Name	Club From	Fee
25 January 2011	FW	Bradley Wright-Phillips	Plymouth Argyle	Undisclosed
22 March 2011	MF	Michael Stewart	None	Free

== Transfers out ==
=== Summer ===
Date	Position	Name	Club from	Fee
30 June 2010	MF	Matthew Spring	Leyton Orient	Free
30 June 2010	DF	Jack Clark	None	Released
30 June 2010	FW	Chris Dickson	Nea Salamis	Released
30 June 2010	FW	Leon McKenzie	Northampton Town	Released
30 June 2010	MF	Dean Sinclair	Grimsby Town	Released
30 June 2010	GK	Tony Warner	Leeds United	Released
2 July 2010	FW	Stuart Fleetwood	Hereford United	Undisclosed
6 July 2010	DF	Frazer Richardson	Southampton	Free
8 July 2010	MF	Nicky Bailey	Middlesbrough	£1,400,000
9 July 2010	MF	Lloyd Sam	Leeds United	Free
16 July 2010	FW	Deon Burton	Gabala SC	Undisclosed

=== Winter ===
Date	Position	Name	Club To	Fee
31 January 2011	FW	Akpo Sodje	Hibernian	Free
28 February 2011	FW	Pawel Abbott	Ruch Chorzów	Free

== Loans in ==
Date	Position	Name	From	Length
5 August 2010	DF	Matt Fry	West Ham United	Until February 5
7 August 2010	MF	Lee Martin	Ipswich Town	Until January 18
17 September 2010	GK	Luke Daniels	West Bromwich Albion	One Month
13 January 2011	FW	Nathan Eccleston	Liverpool	Until end of season
31 January 2011	DF	Federico Bessone	Leeds United	Until end of season
8 March 2011	GK	Neil Etheridge	Fulham	Until March 16
12 March 2011	FW	Frank Nouble	West Ham United	One Month
12 March 2011	MF	Dean Parrett	Tottenham Hotspur	Until end of season
18 March 2011	GK	John Sullivan	Millwall	One Month
