= Alefe Santos =

Brazilian footballer (born 1995)

Personal information
- Full name: Alefein Santos D'Abadia
- Date of birth: 1 March 1995 (age 31)
- Place of birth: São Paulo, Brazil
- Height: 1.78 m (5 ft 10 in)
- Positions: Midfielder; winger

Team information
- Current team: Shaftesbury

Youth career
- Stoke City
- 2011–2013: Bristol Rovers

Senior career*
Years	Team	Apps	(Gls)
2012–2014	Bristol Rovers	29	(1)
2014–2017	Derby County	0	(0)
2015	→ Notts County (loan)	3	(0)
2016	→ Eastleigh (loan)	4	(0)
2017–2019	Yeovil Town	31	(0)
2019–2020	Aldershot Town	25	(2)
2020–2021	Weymouth	6	(0)
2021–2023	Chippenham Town	67	(7)
2023	Poole Town	6	(0)
2023–2024	Gloucester City	16	(1)
2024	Tiverton Town	6	(0)
2024	Poole Town	10	(1)
2024–2025	Hungerford Town	22	(2)
2025–	Shaftesbury	5	(2)
- * Club domestic league appearances and goals as of 23:26, 15 March 2025 (UTC)

Alefein "Alefe" Santos D'Abadia (born 1 March 1995) is a Brazilian footballer who plays as a winger for Shaftesbury.

== Early life ==
Santos was born in São Paulo before moving to England when he was 12 years old.

“My parents told me I would have a better chance here in the UK, and better opportunities to achieve my dream to become a professional footballer,” Santos said about his transition from Brazil to England."

== Career ==
=== Bristol Rovers ===
Santos began his career at Stoke City as a schoolboy before joining Bristol Rovers on a two-year scholarship in the summer of 2011. The next season, he made his professional debut whilst still considered a youth player on 20 November 2012, in a 4–0 defeat to Port Vale in Football League Two, coming on as a substitute for Fabian Broghammer after 60 minutes.

He signed his professional contract with the club on 23 April 2013. Santos became a regular player in the Bristol Rovers first team in the 2013–14 season, playing 27 matches, including 23 in the league, but his team were relegated to the Football Conference. On 12 October 2013, he scored his only goal for Bristol Rovers, in a 1–1 league draw with Mansfield Town at Field Mill; he came on for Andy Bond after 72 minutes and scored the equaliser 12 minutes later.

=== Derby County ===
He signed a two-year contract with the option of a third year at Derby County on 1 July 2014 after turning down a new contract with Bristol Rovers. He had previously been in discussions with Premier League club Hull City. Santos made his Derby debut on 26 August, replacing Johnny Russell for the last 20 minutes of a 1–0 League Cup victory over Charlton Athletic.

==== Notts County (loan) ====
Having not made another appearance since his debut, on 9 January 2015 Santos went on a one-month loan to League One club Notts County, and made a total of 3 appearances.

==== Eastleigh (loan) ====
On 10 November 2016, National League side Eastleigh announced that they had reached an agreement with Derby to sign Santos on a short-term loan until 2 January 2017. His loan was cut short after just 28 days, when Derby exercised their right to call him back from Eastleigh.

=== Yeovil Town ===
On 25 July 2017, following a successful trial period, Santos signed for League Two club Yeovil Town signing a two-year contract. At the end of the 2018–19 season, Santos was released by Yeovil following the club's relegation from the Football League.

=== Non-League ===
On 5 July 2019, Santos agreed to join National League side, Aldershot Town on a one-year deal.

On 31 August 2020, Santos signed for newly-promoted National League side Weymouth. Santos left the club at the end of the season after making just eight appearances in all competitions.

On 21 June 2021, Santos joined National League South side Chippenham Town. Santos signed on for a second season in June 2022 following a record league finish for the club and defeat in the play-offs.

On 22 June 2023, Santos signed for Southern League Premier Division South club Poole Town. Santos made his debut against Hendon coming on as a second half substitute for Luke Nippard.

On 16 October 2023, Santos joined National League North club Gloucester City following his departure from Poole Town. In January 2024, he joined Tiverton Town, before returning to Poole Town in March of the same year.

== Playing style ==
Santos describes himself as "a very direct player who likes to run at the full-back and get crosses in and create chances for the team".

== Career statistics ==
As of match played 8 March 2025

Appearances and goals by club, season and competition
Club	Season	League			FA Cup		League Cup		Other		Total	
Club	Season	Division	Apps	Goals	Apps	Goals	Apps	Goals	Apps	Goals	Apps	Goals
Bristol Rovers	2012–13	League Two	1	0	0	0	0	0	0	0	1	0
Bristol Rovers	2013–14	League Two	23	1	2	0	1	0	1 (Note: Appearance in Football League Trophy)	0	27	1
Bristol Rovers	Total		24	1	2	0	1	0	1	0	28	1
Derby County	2014–15	Championship	0	0	0	0	1	0	—		1	0
Derby County	2015–16	Championship	0	0	0	0	0	0	—		0	0
Derby County	2016–17	Championship	0	0	—		0	0	—		0	0
Derby County	Total		0	0	0	0	1	0	—		1	0
Notts County (loan)	2014–15	League One	3	0	—		—		—		3	0
Eastleigh (loan)	2016–17	National League	4	0	1	0	—		—		5	0
Yeovil Town	2017–18	League Two	14	0	4	0	0	0	6 (Note: Appearances in EFL Trophy)	0	24	0
Yeovil Town	2018–19	League Two	17	0	0	0	0	0	2	0	19	0
Yeovil Town	Total		31	0	4	0	0	0	8	0	43	0
Aldershot Town	2019–20	National League	25	2	1	0	—		1 (Note: Appearance in FA Trophy)	0	27	2
Weymouth	2020–21	National League	6	0	1	0	—		1	0	8	0
Chippenham Town	2021–22	National League South	35	5	2	0	—		4 (Note: One appearance in FA Trophy, one appearance in Wiltshire Premier Shield and two appearances in National League South play-offs)	0	41	5
Chippenham Town	2022–23	National League South	32	2	4	0	—		1	0	37	2
Chippenham Town	Total		67	7	6	0	—		5	0	78	7
Poole Town	2023–24	Southern League; Premier Division South	6	0	3	0	—		0	0	9	0
Gloucester City	2023–24	National League North	16	1	—		—		0	0	16	1
Tiverton Town	2023–24	Southern League; Premier Division South	6	0	—		—		0	0	6	0
Poole Town	2023–24	Southern League; Premier Division South	10	1	—		—		—		10	1
Hungerford Town	2024–25	Southern League; Premier Division South	22	2	3	0	—		2 (Note: One appearance in FA Trophy, one appearance in Berks & Bucks Senior Cup)	0	27	2
Shaftesbury	2024–25	Southern League; Division One South	5	2	—		—		—		5	2
Career total			225	16	21	0	2	0	18	0	266	16
