= Matt Fry =

English association football player in defence (born 1990)

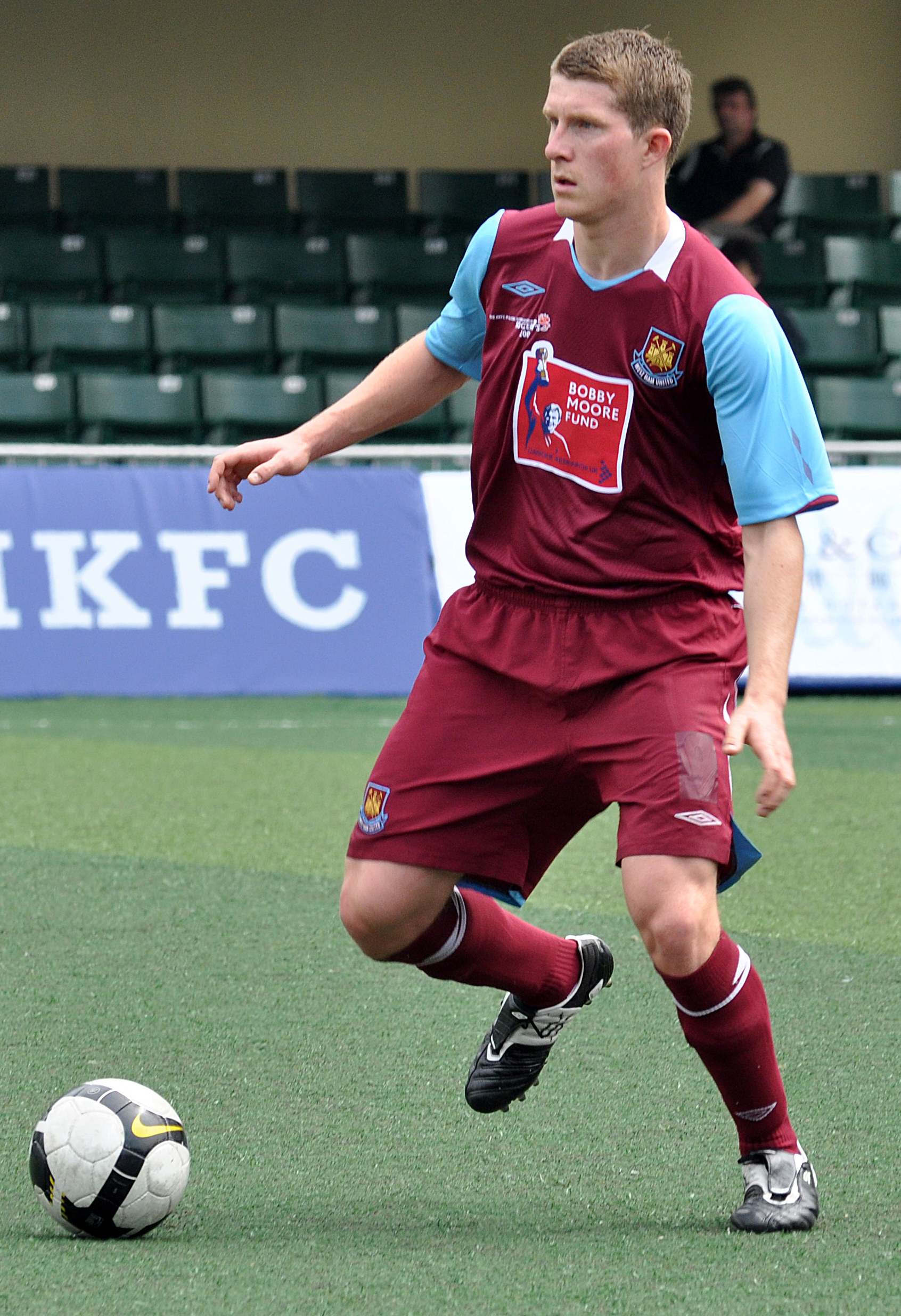
- Fry playing for West Ham United in 2009

Personal information
- Full name: Matthew Ronald Fry
- Date of birth: 26 September 1990 (age 36)
- Place of birth: Longfield, England
- Height: 6 ft 1 in (1.85 m)
- Position: Defender

Youth career
- Gravesend & Northfleet
- –2009: West Ham United

Senior career*
Years	Team	Apps	(Gls)
2009–2012	West Ham United	0	(0)
2009–2010	→ Gillingham (loan)	11	(0)
2010	→ Charlton Athletic (loan)	0	(0)
2010–2011	→ Charlton Athletic (loan)	25	(1)
2012	Bradford City	6	(0)
2013	Concord Rangers	?	(?)
2013–2014	Dartford	15	(0)
2014	Concord Rangers	7	(0)
2014	Chelmsford City	1	(0)
2014	Eastleigh	3	(0)
2014–2015	Concord Rangers	30	(0)
2015–2016	Braintree Town	27	(0)
2016–2017	York City	21	(2)
2018	Herne Bay	?	(?)
Total		146	(3)
- * Club domestic league appearances and goals as of 16:45, 25 January 2022 (UTC)

Matthew Ronald Fry (born 26 September 1990) is an English former professional footballer who played as a defender. He played for West Ham United, Gillingham, Charlton Athletic, Bradford City, Concord Rangers, Dartford, Chelmsford City, Eastleigh Braintree Town, York City and Herne Bay.

== Career ==
=== Early career ===
Fry was born in Longfield, Kent. He is a product of Gravesend & Northfleet's youth team. Aged eleven he joined West Ham United's youth team, and captained the under-18 team in the 2008–09 season, before signing his first professional contract in June 2009.

He signed for League One club Gillingham on a one-month loan on 15 October 2009. He made his debut on 17 October 2009, in a 2–0 away defeat against Milton Keynes Dons. In November 2009, his loan with Gillingham was extended for a further month, and in December extended again for another month. Fry suffered a knee injury in Gillingham's away match against Exeter City on 28 December 2009, ruling him out of action for six weeks. On 7 January 2010, he returned to West Ham.

On 25 March 2010, he signed for League One club Charlton Athletic until the end of the season, but returned to West Ham without having played for Charlton due to a persisting knee problem suffered earlier in the year. On 5 August 2010, Fry again joined Charlton on loan, this time until January 2011. On 28 August 2010, Fry made his first appearance for Charlton and scored his first goal, in a 3–1 away defeat to Huddersfield Town. On 22 March 2011, Fry returned to West Ham having made 32 appearances, scoring one goal, for Charlton.

Fry had his contract cancelled by mutual consent with West Ham on 2 February 2012 allowing him to seek first-team football on a regular basis.

=== Bradford City ===
On 10 February 2012, Fry joined League Two club Bradford City on a free transfer. He made his debut in a 1–1 draw at home to Port Vale on 14 February 2012, in which he played 79 minutes before being substituted.

=== Concord Rangers ===
After leaving Bradford, Fry played for Concord Rangers, helping them win promotion from the Isthmian League Premier Division to the Conference South in 2012–13 via the play-offs. In May 2013, Fry played for Concord against Lowestoft Town in the play-off final at Crown Meadow, with Concord winning 2–1 to gain promotion.

=== Dartford, Concord, Braintree ===
In June 2013, Fry signed for Dartford, but returned to Concord in March 2014 having made 15 appearances. In June 2015, he signed for Braintree Town.

=== York City ===
Fry signed for newly relegated National League club York City on 16 June 2016 on a two-year contract. His contract with York was cancelled by mutual consent on 26 September 2017 to retire from full-time football on medical advice.

=== Herne Bay ===
Fry signed for Isthmian League South East Division club Herne Bay on 20 July 2018.

== Career statistics ==
As of 26 September 2017

Appearances and goals by club, season and competition
Club	Season	League			FA Cup		League Cup		Other		Total	
Club	Season	Division	Apps	Goals	Apps	Goals	Apps	Goals	Apps	Goals	Apps	Goals
West Ham United	2009–10	Premier League	0	0	—		0	0	—		0	0
West Ham United	2010–11	Premier League	0	0	—		—		—		0	0
West Ham United	2011–12	Championship	0	0	0	0	0	0	—		0	0
West Ham United	Total		0	0	0	0	0	0	—		0	0
Gillingham (loan)	2009–10	League One	11	0	2	0	—		—		13	0
Charlton Athletic (loan)	2009–10	League One	0	0	—		—		—		0	0
Charlton Athletic (loan)	2010–11	League One	25	1	4	0	0	0	3 (Note: Appearances in Football League Trophy)	0	32	1
Charlton Athletic (loan)	Total		25	1	4	0	0	0	3	0	32	1
Bradford City	2011–12	League Two	6	0	—		—		—		6	0
Dartford	2013–14	Conference Premier	15	0	3	0	—		0	0	18	0
Concord Rangers	2013–14	Conference South	7	0	—		—		—		7	0
Chelmsford City	2014–15	Conference South	1	0	—		—		—		1	0
Eastleigh	2014–15	Conference Premier	3	0	—		—		—		3	0
Concord Rangers	2014–15	Conference South	30	0	3	0	—		3 (Note: Appearance(s) in FA Trophy)	0	36	0
Braintree Town	2015–16	National League	27	0	1	0	—		2 (Note: Appearances in National League play-offs)	0	30	0
York City	2016–17	National League	21	2	1	0	—		1	0	23	2
Career total			146	3	14	0	0	0	9	0	169	3

== Honours ==
Concord Rangers

- Isthmian League Premier Division play-offs: 2013
