= Mitch Harding =

English footballer and entrepreneur

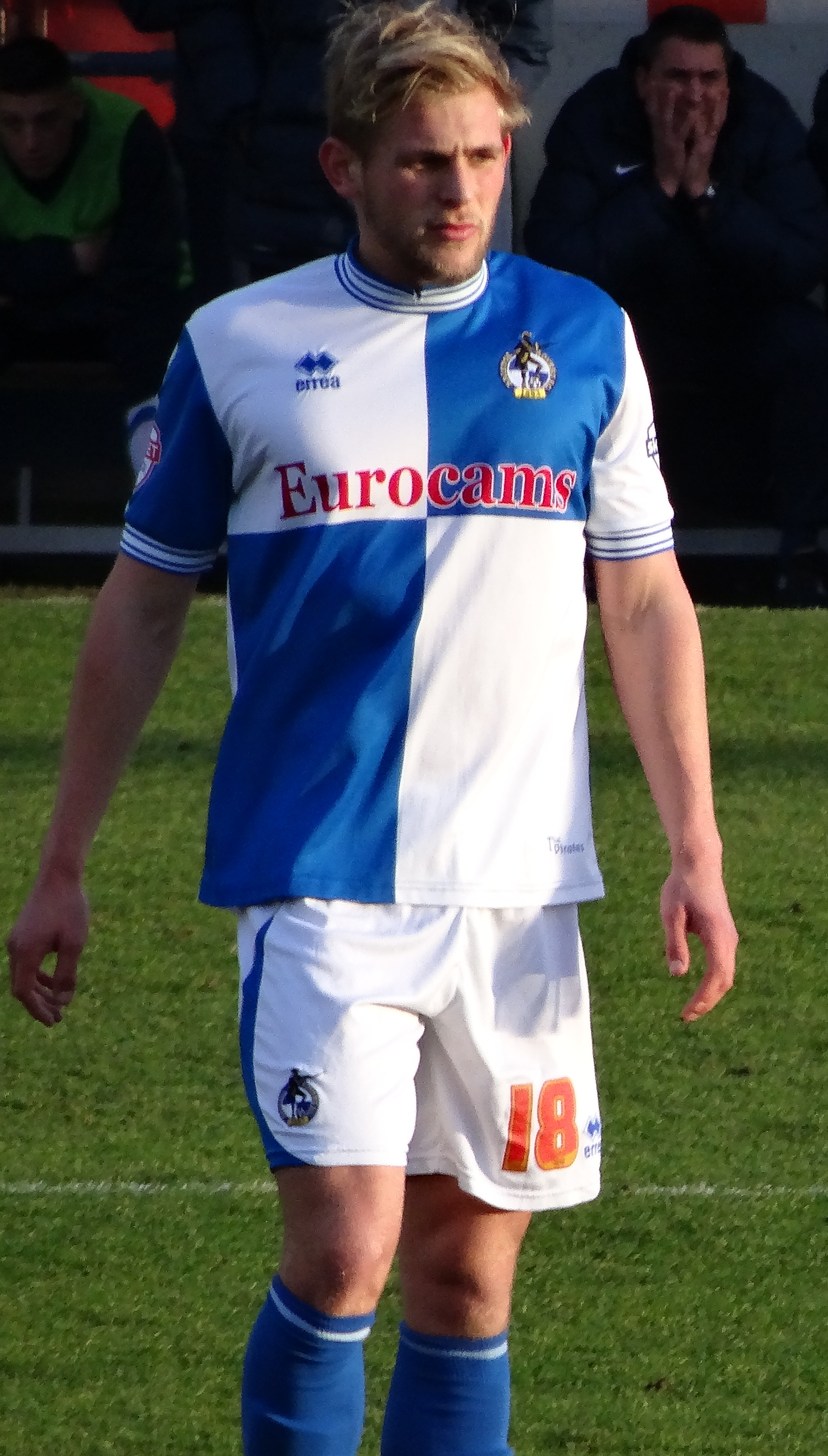
- Harding playing for Bristol Rovers in 2014

Personal information
- Full name: Mitch Peter Harding
- Date of birth: 27 January 1994 (age 32)
- Place of birth: Weston-super-Mare, England
- Position: Forward

Youth career
- 2010–2012: Bristol Rovers

Senior career*
Years	Team	Apps	(Gls)
2012–2014	Bristol Rovers	17	(0)
2012	→ Gloucester City (loan)	5	(1)
- * Club domestic league appearances and goals as of 13:05, 7 May 2014 (UTC)

Mitch Peter Harding (born 27 January 1994) is an English former professional footballer who played as a forward for Bristol Rovers and Gloucester City during his short career.

== Career ==
Harding was born in Weston-super-Mare, Somerset. Mitch was selected to play for North Somerset Football Development and developed very quickly in his early years leading North Somerset to forward him to Bristol Rovers as an under-13 and was signed. He progressed through the youth team of Bristol Rovers and signed a two-year scholarship terms in the summer of 2010. He signed his first professional contract in May 2012, after being voted youth team player of the year. He made his first team debut on 5 May 2012, in a 4–0 defeat to Dagenham & Redbridge, coming on as a second-half substitute for Eliot Richards.

Harding, along with teammate Jordan Goddard, joined Gloucester City on an initial month's loan in October 2012. and went on to score less than a minute into his debut, a 5–1 victory over Bishop's Stortford. Harding's loan was extended for a second month but returned early. He went on to feature five times for Bristol Rovers, all as a substitute, in the remainder of the season.

Harding made his starting 11 debut for Bristol Rovers on the first day of the following season in a 2–1 defeat away to Exeter City. He went on to feature in a further 12 league and cup fixtures, four of them as part of the starting lineup. Harding, along with 11 other players, was released at the end of the season.
