= Neil Etheridge =

Footballer (born 1990)

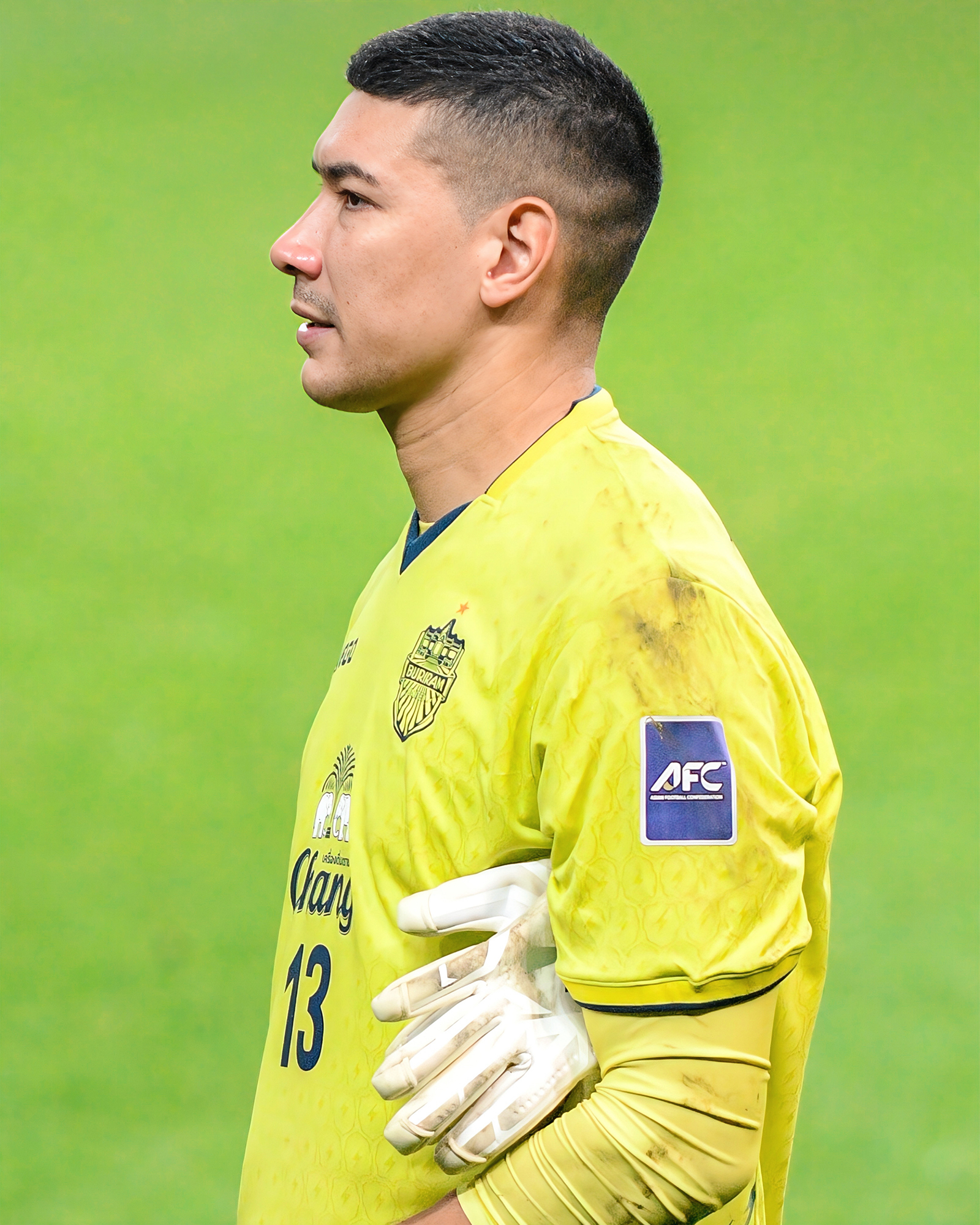
- Etheridge playing for Buriram United in 2025

Personal information
- Full name: Neil Leonard Dula Etheridge
- Date of birth: 7 February 1990 (age 36)
- Place of birth: Enfield, London, England
- Height: 1.88 m (6 ft 2 in)
- Position: Goalkeeper

Team information
- Current team: Buriram United
- Number: 13

Youth career
- 2003–2006: Chelsea
- 2006–2008: Fulham

Senior career*
Years	Team	Apps	(Gls)
2008–2014	Fulham	0	(0)
2008–2009	→ Leatherhead (loan)	6	(0)
2011	→ Charlton Athletic (loan)	0	(0)
2012	→ Bristol Rovers (loan)	12	(0)
2013–2014	→ Crewe Alexandra (loan)	4	(0)
2014–2015	Oldham Athletic	0	(0)
2014	→ Charlton Athletic (loan)	2	(0)
2015	Charlton Athletic	2	(0)
2015–2017	Walsall	81	(0)
2017–2020	Cardiff City	99	(0)
2020–2024	Birmingham City	70	(0)
2024–	Buriram United	59	(0)

International career
2005	England U16	1	(0)
2008–2024	Philippines	82	(0)
Medal record
Representing Philippines
AFC Challenge Cup
Runner-up	2014
Third place	2012
- * Club domestic league appearances and goals as of 15:42, 10 May 2026 (UTC)

Neil Leonard Dula Etheridge (born 7 February 1990) is a professional footballer who plays as a goalkeeper for Thai League 1 club Buriram United.

He joined the Fulham Academy after three years as a trainee at Chelsea and made his debut for Fulham in the UEFA Europa League against Danish club Odense Boldklub, though he never played in a league match with the club. While with Fulham from 2006 until 2014, Etheridge was loaned to various lower-tier clubs, namely Leatherhead, Charlton Athletic, Bristol Rovers, and Crewe Alexandra.

After leaving Fulham, Etheridge signed with Oldham Athletic before he was loaned to Charlton Athletic. He joined Charlton on a permanent basis in 2015 after his contract with Oldham ended. After months of being without a club, Etheridge joined League One club Walsall, going on to make more than 90 appearances in all competitions in two seasons. He then moved on to Championship club Cardiff City in 2017. After establishing himself as Cardiff's first-choice goalkeeper, he helped the Welsh side win promotion to the Premier League. In the 2018–19 season, he became the first Filipino to play in the Premier League. After three years with Cardiff City, he joined Championship club Birmingham City. Etheridge was released by Birmingham in 2024 and signed for Thai League 1 club Buriram United.

Etheridge was born in England to an English father and Filipino mother. In international tournaments, he played for his native England at under-16 level before representing the Philippines at senior level from 2008 to 2024. He was appointed as the Philippines' captain in 2021, and served in this role for the national team for three years.

== Early life ==
Etheridge was born in Enfield, London to an English father, Martin Etheridge, and a Filipino mother, Merlinda Dula, a native of Tarlac. He took up football at the age of nine, initially playing as a left midfielder or striker before switching to playing as a goalkeeper in 2000 after volunteering to switch due to an injury to his youth side's regular goalkeeper. He attended Court Moor School in Fleet, Hampshire, where he also represented Hampshire Schools and the Aldershot & Farnborough district teams.

== Club career ==
=== Chelsea Academy ===
Having played for local youth sides Cuffy Chiefs and Hart Boys, Etheridge began attending the Chelsea Academy in 2003 at under-14 level, where he was also teammates with eventual Philippine internationals James and Phil Younghusband. He started out as a forward but eventually switched to playing as a goalkeeper at the suggestion of his coach.

=== Fulham ===
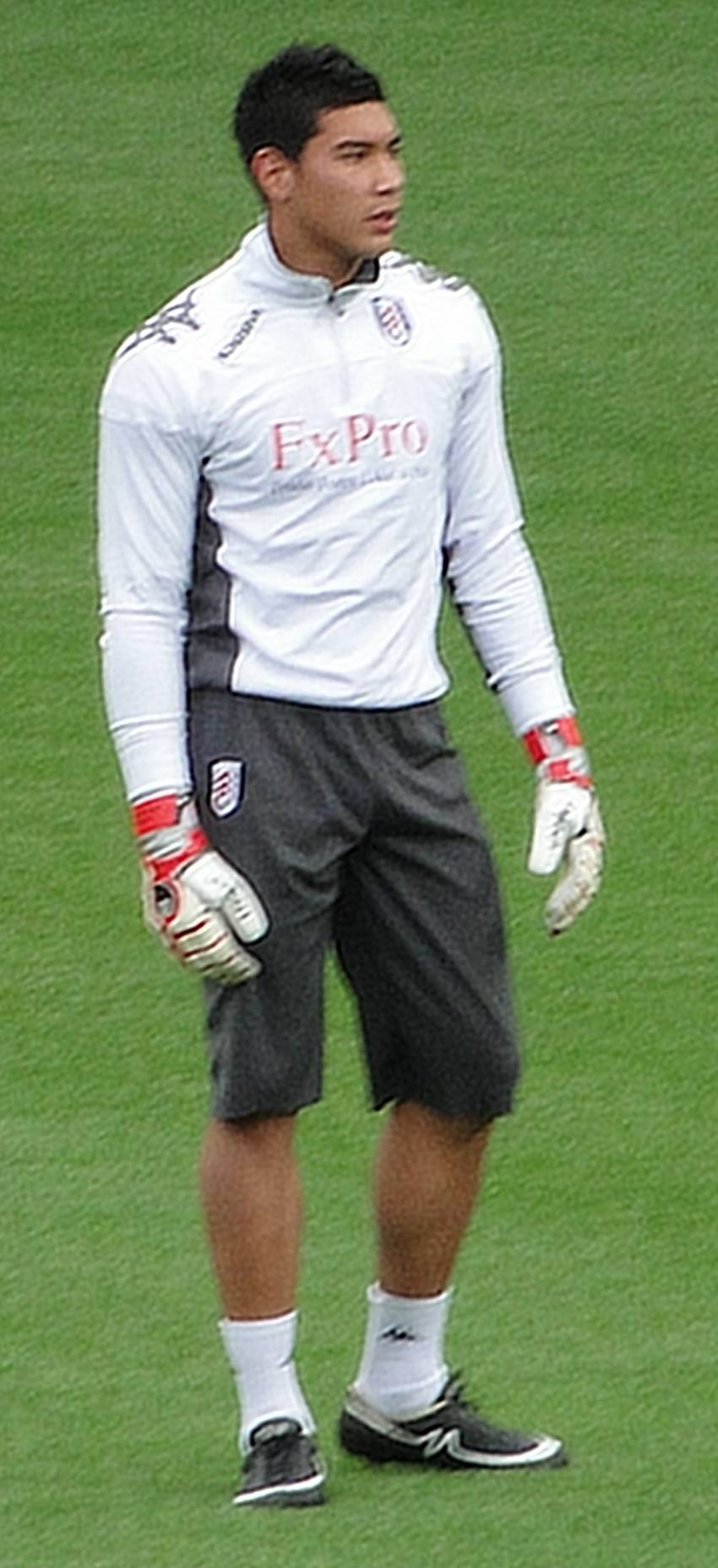
Etheridge training with Fulham in 2010

In 2006, Etheridge moved to local rivals Fulham, and signed professional terms for the club. Etheridge signed for Isthmian League Division One South club Leatherhead in September 2008 on loan for the 2008–09 season. During his loan spell, he received the first red card of his career, being sent off for dissent during a 2–1 defeat to Sittingbourne in a preliminary round of the FA Trophy. He made six league appearances.

In September 2009, Etheridge underwent surgery on both knees after suffering from tendinitis. He was expected to be out for the entire 2009–10 season but returned in January 2010, eventually making nine appearances for the reserves. By the end of the season he signed a new one-year deal, keeping him at Fulham until the summer of 2011, attributing his contract extension to his quick recovery. Etheridge received his first senior team call-up on 11 September 2010, when he was named on the substitutes' bench as cover for Mark Schwarzer in a home game against Wolverhampton Wanderers due to an injury to regular second-choice goalkeeper David Stockdale. In March 2011, Etheridge joined League One club Charlton Athletic on loan, but was recalled six days later without playing for them. Etheridge signed a new contract in May that would extend his stay at Craven Cottage until the summer of 2013.

He made his first senior appearance for Fulham against Odense Boldklub in the 2011–12 UEFA Europa League on 14 December. On 23 March 2012 upon his return to Fulham after completing his international duties, it was announced that Etheridge would be out for the rest of the season due to a wrist injury that was sustained in the 2012 AFC Challenge Cup. He recovered quickly and on 9 May he has been able to play in the development squad's last game of the season against the reserves of West Bromwich Albion.

He joined League Two club Bristol Rovers on an initial one-month loan on 20 September 2012. He made his first Football League appearance for Rovers against Fleetwood Town on 22 September, which was his and Rovers' first clean sheet of 2012–13 season. His arrival at the club coincided with an improvement in the club's form, leading to his loan deal being extended until December 2013. On 21 November, Fulham confirmed that Etheridge had been recalled from his loan at Bristol Rovers.

Etheridge signed a one-year extension to his Fulham contract on 8 May 2013, with the option of a further year extension. On 22 November 2013, he joined League One club Crewe Alexandra on loan until 1 January 2014. He rejoined the club on 25 February 2014 on loan until 13 April, but was recalled on 4 April by Fulham. At the end of the 2013–14 season, he was released by Fulham.

=== Oldham Athletic and return to Charlton Athletic ===
Following his release from Fulham, Etheridge used his own money to train with Charlton, one of his former loan clubs, where he knew the goalkeeping coach. Struggling to make a living, he was set to return to the Philippines and had already sold his house and cars before joining League One club Oldham Athletic on a two-month deal on 30 October 2014. During his time with the club, he lived at his friend's house, sleeping on the sofa, later describing his situation as "what you've got to do to get by." Etheridge later reminisced on his circumstances, stating that he questioned whether he would ever play football again. He made one appearance for Oldham during his time with the club during a Football League Trophy match against Preston North End.

Etheridge rejoined Charlton Athletic on 27 November 2014 on a one-month loan deal. He made his league debut for Charlton on 26 December, in a 1–1 draw against Cardiff City. Manager Bob Peeters had opted to play Etheridge, Charlton's third-choice goalkeeper, ahead of second-choice Nick Pope whose performances in previous games Peeters had described as "a bit unlucky". After the loan, he signed a signed a short-term contract on 5 January 2015 with Charlton until the end of the 2014–15 season. He was released on 12 May 2015 following the end of his contract.

=== Walsall ===
Etheridge joined League One club Walsall on 2 July 2015 after agreeing a two-year deal. Signed to compete with Craig MacGillivray for the first-choice goalkeeper spot, he made his debut for the club on the opening day of the 2015–16 season in a 1–1 draw with his former club Oldham. Etheridge credits Walsall's goalkeeper coach Neil Cutler with improving his ability, commenting that Cutler had "taken me to another level." Cutler himself praised Etheridge's progression, stating "with a bit more experience he can go as high as he wants because he makes match-winning saves." In his first season, he made 50 appearances in all competitions, helping the side reach the League One play-offs where they suffered defeat in the semi-final to Barnsley.

During his second season with Walsall, Etheridge was one of just four senior players retained from the previous year. He kept 12 clean sheets in 44 appearances as the club finished the season in 14th place, missing the last five matches of the season due to injury. In January 2017, Cardiff City approached Walsall over a potential transfer but pulled out due to the asking price. He played a total of 94 matches with Walsall during his two seasons at the club.

=== Cardiff City ===
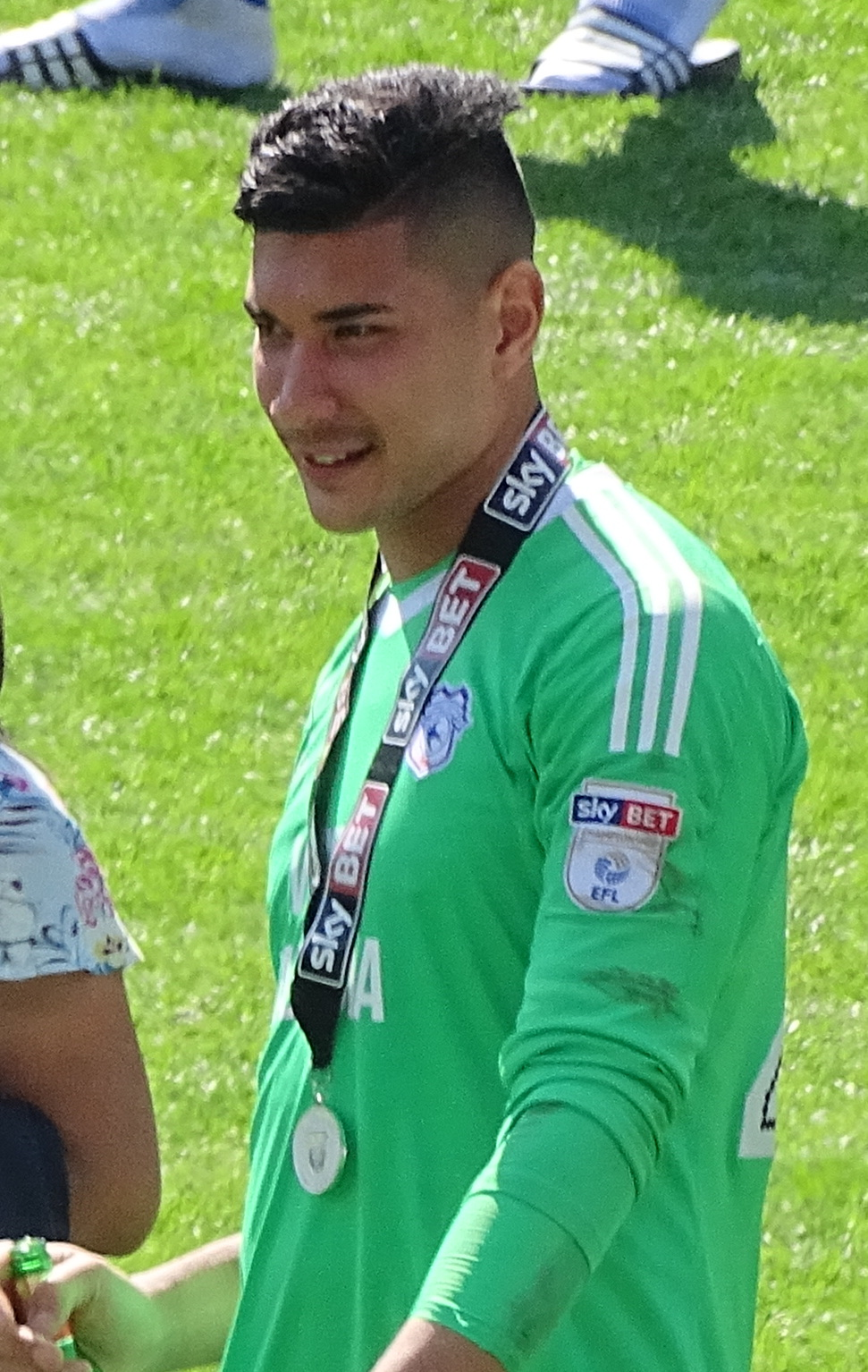
Etheridge after Cardiff City's promotion in 2018

On 30 May 2017, Etheridge signed for Championship club Cardiff City on a free transfer, after rejecting a new three-year contract with Walsall. Etheridge made his debut for the club on the opening day of the 2017–18 season, keeping a clean sheet during a 1–0 victory over Burton Albion. Etheridge performed well enough playing for Cardiff that fellow goalkeeper Lee Camp was loaned to Sunderland after recovering from injury. He helped his club earn promotion to the Premier League, featuring in 45 out of 46 league matches of the 2017–18 Championship season, keeping 19 clean sheets and conceding 37 goals.

Following the club's promotion, Etheridge was rewarded with a new three-year contract by the club. On 11 August 2018, he became the first player from the Philippines and Southeast Asia to play in the Premier League, in a 2–0 loss to AFC Bournemouth, during which he saved a penalty from Callum Wilson. His penalty save also made him the first goalkeeper to save a penalty on his Premier League debut since Allan McGregor for Hull City in 2013. A week later, he saved another penalty in injury time, from Newcastle United's Kenedy, to guarantee a goalless draw. Etheridge's impressive form led to him being nominated for the August Premier League Player of the Month award. Cardiff were relegated from the Premier League after finishing in 18th position and Etheridge won the club's Player of the Year award.

On the opening day of the 2019–20 season, Etheridge suffered a hamstring injury during a 3–2 loss at Wigan Athletic, which ruled him out for two months. Alex Smithies replaced Etheridge as Cardiff's first-choice goalkeeper for most of the season. Ahead of the 2020–21 season, with Smithies considered the starting goalkeeper, Cardiff made Etheridge available for a possible transfer.

=== Birmingham City ===
Etheridge signed a four-year contract with Championship club Birmingham City on 11 September 2020; the fee was undisclosed. He was on the bench for the following day's match, in which the 19-year-old debutant Zach Jeacock kept a clean sheet, and came into the starting eleven for the goalless draw at Swansea City a week later.

Amidst the COVID-19 pandemic, Etheridge received hospital treatment in July 2021 after he contracted COVID-19. Consequently, Etheridge had not played a single league match for Birmingham by October 2021 despite having featured in the 2021–22 EFL Cup.

With John Ruddy established as first-choice goalkeeper for the 2022–23 season, Etheridge did not make a Championship appearance until 18 April, when Ruddy was injured during the first half of the visit to Millwall. Between them, they kept a clean sheet in a 1–0 win that ensured Birmingham's Championship status for a further season. On 18 May 2024, the club announced he would be leaving in the summer when his contract expired.

=== Buriram United ===
Etheridge signed for Thai League 1 club Buriram United on 30 June 2024. He make his debut for the club on 10 August keeping a clean sheet in a 4–0 win against Nongbua Pitchaya. Etheridge went on to keep 4 clean sheets in 5 matches for the club including a goalless draw in the 2024–25 AFC Champions League Elite match against Japanese club Vissel Kobe. In his first season at the club, he went on to keep 24 clean sheet for the club in 48 appearances in all competition played.

During the 2nd leg of the round of 16 tie against Australian club Melbourne City in the 2025–26 AFC Champions League Elite on 10 March 2026, Etheridge saved two penalties in the penalties shootout which sees Buriram United advanced to the quarter-finals of the tournament.

== International career ==
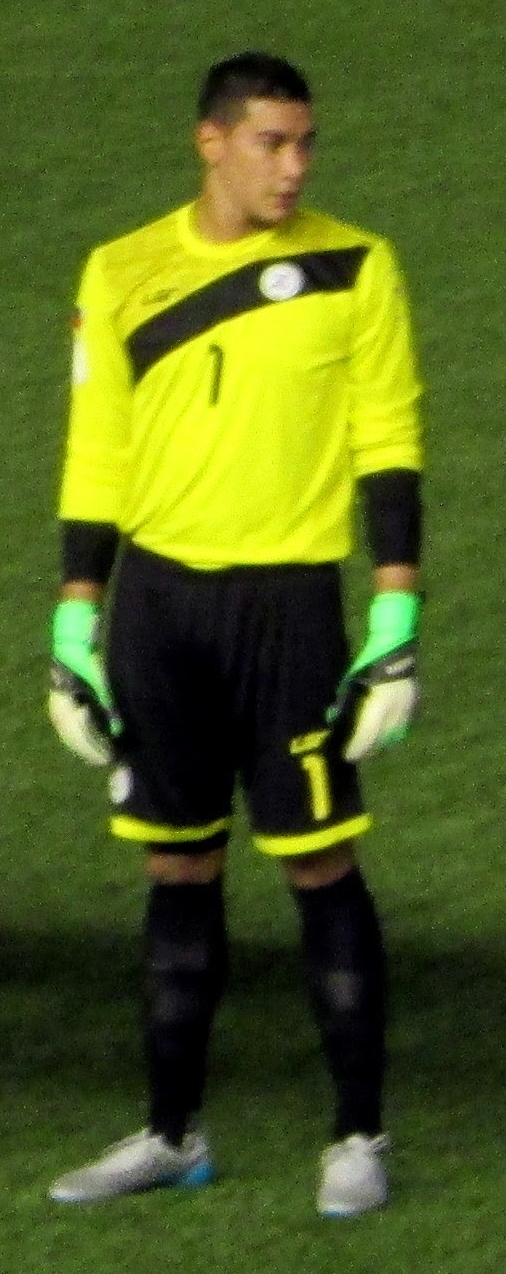
Etheridge with the Philippines in 2015

=== England youth ===
Etheridge is a former England under-16 international, having played in the 2005 Victory Shield, in which England and Wales eventually shared the trophy. Despite having represented England at youth level, he remained eligible to represent the Philippines through his mother.

=== Philippines ===
==== Early years ====
In 2007, Etheridge received an invitation to play for the Philippines but declined the offer, citing unfamiliarity with the language and the players. He was again invited in early 2008, this time by the new Philippine Football Federation president Jose Mari Martinez. He eventually accepted the invitation after speaking to the new manager and learning about the setup, and after encouragement from Chelsea youth teammate Phil Younghusband. He officially switched allegiance to the Philippines in April 2008. He made his full international debut against Brunei in the 2008 AFC Challenge Cup qualifiers, playing in all three of his country's matches. He kept three clean sheets but the Philippines still failed to qualify due to an inferior goal difference to group winners Tajikistan.

He was called up again later that year for the 2008 AFF Suzuki Cup qualification matches. In their opening match, Etheridge kept his fourth successive clean sheet, as the Philippines defeated Timor-Leste 1–0. However, in their remaining three fixtures, Etheridge conceded five goals as the Philippines won another match, drew one and lost one, before being eliminated on the basis of their goals scored record after finishing tied for second. Etheridge later credited his debut for the Philippines in 2008 to his later progress in his club career in 2018 due to having experienced playing for the national team before a crowd of up to 90,000.

==== 2010 onwards ====
In 2010, Etheridge was named in the Philippines' squad for the 2010 AFF Suzuki Cup. The Philippines came in second in their group, with one win and two draws, and conceding only one goal, but both legs of the semi-finals ended in 1–0 defeats for the Philippines against Indonesia. He was then called up for his country for the AFC Challenge Cup Qualifiers where he conceded only a single goal, enabling the Philippines to qualify for the group stage. Etheridge announced his interest to join the squad for the 2012 AFC Challenge Cup but was originally in doubt to be included due to club commitments. However, after receiving clearance from Fulham to travel, he was included in the final 23-man squad.

On 9 March 2012 against North Korea, he saved a penalty taken by Pak Song-chol in the 16th minute as the match ended 2–0. He was sent off in the closing minutes of the semi-final match against Turkmenistan, which the Philippines lost 2–1. Due to the red card, he was suspended for the subsequent third place play-off match, in which the Philippines defeated Palestine 4–3.

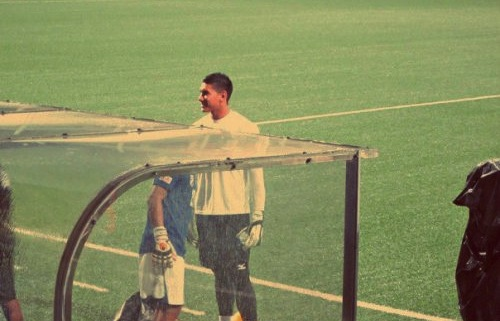
Etheridge with the Philippines during a match against Singapore

In August 2014, Etheridge was not included in the training squad for the 2014 Peace Cup, which also serves as the country's preliminary squad for the 2014 AFF Suzuki Cup, due to a lack of first team club football. He labelled manager Thomas Dooley "disrespectful" over the omission.

In October 2016, it was announced that Etheridge would not be included in the 2016 AFF Championship squad, because of club commitments with Walsall. Etheridge expressed disappointment of missing out on the regional championship, but added that he was committed to playing for his club. In 2018, Etheridge was part of the Philippines' squad that qualified for the AFC Asian Cup for the first time in the nation's history. However, the national side and his club side Cardiff reached an agreement to allow Etheridge to miss the tournament in order to focus on his place as the Premier League side's first-choice goalkeeper.

In June 2022, Etheridge was appointed by head coach Thomas Dooley as captain of the Philippines national team.

Etheridge's last match for the Philippines was the 4 September 2024 friendly against Malaysia.

==== Retirement ====
Having last played for the Philippines in 2024, Etheridge clarified in March and June 2025 that he had not yet retired from the national team and was ready to play for the Philippines if he received a call up. On 1 June 2026, Etheridge announced his retirement from international play in a social media post. He made a total of 82 appearances for the Philippines in a span of 18 years.

== Personal life ==
Etheridge has been married to Alexandra Solera since May 2021 and the two have a daughter. Prior to their marriage, Etheridge was engaged to Solera for three years. In 2015, he opened the Neil Etheridge Goalkeeping Academy in Manila.

== Career statistics ==
=== Club ===
As of match played 31 May 2026

Appearances and goals by club, season and competition
Club	Season	League			National cup (Note: Includes FA Cup, Thai FA Cup)		League cup (Note: Includes Football League Cup / EFL Cup, Thai League Cup)		Continental		Other		Total	
Club	Season	Division	Apps	Goals	Apps	Goals	Apps	Goals	Apps	Goals	Apps	Goals	Apps	Goals
Fulham	2008–09	Premier League	0	0	—		0	0	—		—		0	0
Fulham	2009–10	Premier League	0	0	0	0	0	0	0	0	—		0	0
Fulham	2010–11	Premier League	0	0	0	0	0	0	—		—		0	0
Fulham	2011–12	Premier League	0	0	0	0	0	0	1 (Note: Appearance in UEFA Europa League)	0	—		1	0
Fulham	2012–13	Premier League	0	0	0	0	0	0	—		—		0	0
Fulham	2013–14	Premier League	0	0	0	0	0	0	—		—		0	0
Fulham	Total		0	0	0	0	0	0	1	0	—		1	0
Leatherhead (loan)	2008–09	Isthmian League Div. One South	6	0	0	0	—		—		1 (Note: Appearance in FA Trophy)	0	7	0
Charlton Athletic (loan)	2010–11	League One	0	0	—		—		—		—		0	0
Bristol Rovers (loan)	2012–13	League Two	12	0	—		—		—		—		12	0
Crewe Alexandra (loan)	2013–14	League One	4	0	—		—		—		—		4	0
Oldham Athletic	2014–15	League One	0	0	0	0	0	0	—		1 (Note: Appearance in Football League Trophy)	0	1	0
Charlton Athletic	2014–15 (Note: Part of this season was spent on loan from Oldham Athletic)	Championship	4	0	1	0	—		—		—		5	0
Walsall	2015–16	League One	40	0	5	0	3	0	—		2 (Note: Appearances in League One play-offs)	0	50	0
Walsall	2016–17	League One	41	0	1	0	1	0	—		0	0	43	0
Walsall	Total		81	0	6	0	4	0	—		2	0	93	0
Cardiff City	2017–18	Championship	45	0	2	0	0	0	—		—		47	0
Cardiff City	2018–19	Premier League	38	0	0	0	0	0	—		—		38	0
Cardiff City	2019–20	Championship	16	0	1	0	0	0	—		—		17	0
Cardiff City	2020–21	Championship	0	0	0	0	0	0	—		—		0	0
Cardiff City	Total		99	0	3	0	0	0	—		—		102	0
Birmingham City	2020–21	Championship	43	0	0	0	—		—		—		43	0
Birmingham City	2021–22	Championship	21	0	1	0	1	0	—		—		23	0
Birmingham City	2022–23	Championship	4	0	3	0	1	0	—		—		8	0
Birmingham City	2023–24	Championship	2	0	1	0	2	0	—		—		5	0
Birmingham City	Total		70	0	5	0	4	0	—		—		79	0
Buriram United	2024–25	Thai League 1	30	0	3	0	4	0	11 (Note: Appearances in AFC Champions League Elite)	0	—		48	0
Buriram United	2025–26	Thai League 1	29	0	2	0	2	0	11	0	5 (Note: Appearances in ASEAN Club Championship)	0	49	0
Buriram United	Total		59	0	5	0	6	0	22	0	5	0	97	0
Career total			335	0	20	0	14	0	23	0	9	0	401	0

=== International ===
Appearances and goals by national team and year
National team	Year	Apps	Goals
Philippines	2008	7	0
Philippines	2009	3	0
Philippines	2010	8	0
Philippines	2011	10	0
Philippines	2012	11	0
Philippines	2013	4	0
Philippines	2014	1	0
Philippines	2015	6	0
Philippines	2016	3	0
Philippines	2017	5	0
Philippines	2018	4	0
Philippines	2019	3	0
Philippines	2020	0	0
Philippines	2021	0	0
Philippines	2022	5	0
Philippines	2023	8	0
Philippines	2024	4	0
Total		82	0

== Honours ==
Buriram United

- Thai League 1: 2024–25, 2025–26
- Thai FA Cup: 2024–25, 2025–26
- Thai League Cup: 2024–25
- ASEAN Club Championship: 2024–25, 2025–26

Cardiff City

- EFL Championship runner-up: 2017–18

Philippines

- AFC Challenge Cup runner-up: 2014

Individual

- Philippine Sportswriters Association Footballer of the Year (Mr. Football Award): 2018
- Thai League Best XI Mid-Season: 2024–25
- ASEAN Club Championship: Allstar XI 2025–26
