= Jordan Goddard =

English footballer

Personal information
- Full name: Jordan Calum Goddard
- Date of birth: 9 September 1993 (age 33)
- Place of birth: Wolverhampton, England
- Height: 1.77 m (5 ft 9 1/2 in)
- Position: Midfielder

Team information
- Current team: Bromsgrove Sporting

Youth career
- Bristol Rovers

Senior career*
Years	Team	Apps	(Gls)
2011–2014	Bristol Rovers	1	(0)
2012	→ Gloucester City (loan)	8	(2)
2013	→ Gloucester City (loan)	3	(0)
2014	→ Gloucester City (loan)	7	(0)
2014–2015	Leamington	39	(10)
2015–2016	AFC Telford United	6	(0)
2015–2016	→ Sutton Coldfield Town (loan)		
2016–2017	Halesowen Town		
2017	Leamington	13	(1)
2017–2019	Halesowen Town		
2019	Alvechurch	15	(0)
2019–2021	Nuneaton Borough	20	(4)
2021	Halesowen Town	9	(1)
2021–	Bromsgrove Sporting	10	(0)
- * Club domestic league appearances and goals as of 17:00, 23 April 2022 (UTC)

Jordan Calum Goddard (born 9 September 1993) is an English footballer who plays for Southern League Premier Division Central side Bromsgrove Sporting, where he plays as a midfielder.

== Playing career ==
=== Bristol Rovers ===
Although still an apprentice and an under-18 squad member, he made his debut for the Bristol Rovers first team on 12 November 2011 in an FA Cup first round match against Corby Town. After the game, he was investigated by Avon and Somerset Police for allegedly urinating in front of Corby fans as he warmed-up for the match.

He began a two-year scholarship with Bristol Rovers, studying at St. Brendan's Sixth Form College, in September 2010.

=== Gloucester City ===
On 2 October 2011 he joined Gloucester City on loan, along with teammate Mitch Harding. He scored his first goal on his debut for the club on 2 October 2012, in a 5–1 win at home against Bishop's Stortford.

=== Leamington ===
On 18 July 2014 Jordan joined Leamington and made his non competitive debut scoring in a preseason friendly against Cheltenham Town.

=== Bromsgrove Sporting ===
On 18 December 2021, Goddard signed for Southern League Premier Central side Bromsgrove Sporting.

Bromsgrove Sporting confirmed on 17 June 2022, that Goddard, along with teammate Dominic Perkins had both agreed deals to stay with the club for the 2022–23 season.
