= Fabian Broghammer =

German footballer

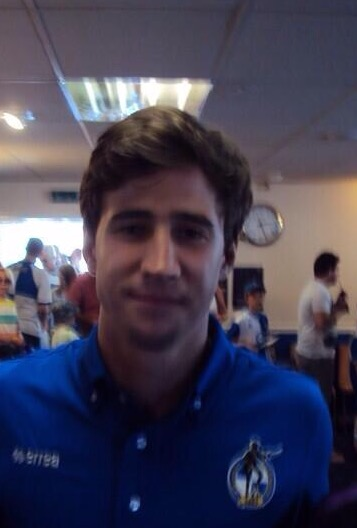
- Broghammer at Bristol Rovers F.C.

Personal information
- Full name: Fabian Broghammer
- Date of birth: 14 January 1990 (age 36)
- Place of birth: Heppenheim, West Germany
- Height: 5 ft 9 in (1.75 m)
- Position: Midfielder

Youth career
- Germania Eberstadt
- SC Viktoria 06 Griesheim
- –2007: Eintracht Frankfurt
- 2007–2008: TSG 1899 Hoffenheim

Senior career*
Years	Team	Apps	(Gls)
2008–2009	1899 Hoffenheim II	4	(0)
2009–2011	VfB Stuttgart II	20	(1)
2011–2012	SV Darmstadt 98	2	(0)
2012	FC Bayern Alzenau	5	(2)
2012–2014	Bristol Rovers	40	(3)
2014–2016	SV Wiesbaden	23	(0)

International career
2006–2007	Germany U17	10	(2)
2008	Germany U18	5	(0)
2008–2009	Germany U19	2	(0)
- * Club domestic league appearances and goals as of 30 August 2016

Fabian Broghammer (born 14 January 1990) is a German footballer.

== Club career ==
=== Bristol Rovers ===
In July 2012, he joined English Football League Two side Bristol Rovers on trial on the recommendation of then VfL Wolfsburg manager Felix Magath, a former Hamburg teammate of Rovers' manager at the time Mark McGhee. On 12 August, it was announced that Broghammer had signed a one-year deal with Rovers, with the option of a second year.

He made his debut for Rovers on the 18 August 2012, against Oxford United coming on as a 50th-minute substitute for midfielder Wayne Brown in Bristol Rovers' first league game of the season. On 8 September 2012, injury time was approaching when he scored his first goal for Bristol Rovers, in the 2-2 home draw against Aldershot. The assist for his goal was from Elliot Richards.

Broghammer took up the option to extend his contract by a further year at Rovers but suffered an anterior cruciate ligament rupture in a pre-season friendly with Hereford United. The injury kept Broghammer out for nine months, returning in the away fixture with Portsmouth. Rovers were relegated at the end of the season and Broghammer was released, having made 40 appearances for the club over two seasons.

=== SV Wiesbaden ===
Broghammer joined SV Wiesbaden on 1 August 2014.

== International career ==
Broghammer represented Germany at under 17, 18, and 19 level, amassing 17 caps overall.

Broghammer was part of the German squad that finished third at the 2007 FIFA U-17 World Cup.
