= Joe Anyinsah =

English footballer (born 1984)

Personal information
- Full name: Joseph Greene Anyinsah
- Date of birth: 8 October 1984 (age 42)
- Place of birth: Bristol, England
- Position: Striker

Senior career*
| Years | Team | Apps | (Gls) |
| 2004–2005 | Bristol City | 7 | (0) |
| 2005 | → Hereford United (loan) | 3 | (0) |
| 2005–2009 | Preston North End | 6 | (0) |
| 2006 | → Bury (loan) | 3 | (0) |
| 2007 | → Carlisle United (loan) | 12 | (3) |
| 2008 | → Crewe Alexandra (loan) | 8 | (0) |
| 2008 | → Brighton & Hove Albion (loan) | 11 | (3) |
| 2009–2010 | Carlisle United | 47 | (13) |
| 2010–2011 | Charlton Athletic | 19 | (3) |
| 2011–2013 | Bristol Rovers | 62 | (8) |
| 2013–2014 | Wrexham | 34 | (4) |
| 2014 | Hayes and Yeading | 5 | (0) |
| Total | | 217 | (34) |
- * Club domestic league appearances and goals as of 22:44, 7 August 2017 (UTC)

Joseph Greene Anyinsah (born 8 October 1984 in Bristol) is an English footballer who plays as a striker who last played for Hayes and Yeading.

== Career ==
=== Bristol City and Preston North End ===
Anyinsah started his career at Bristol City making his debut on 7 August 2004 against Torquay United. In 2005, he spent a month on loan with Hereford United to gain first team experience, where he made his debut in a 1–0 loss against Dagenham & Redbridge on 22 January 2005 and made two more appearances before returning to Bristol City.

At the beginning of the 2005–06 season, Anyinsah opted not to sign a new contract for Bristol City – who he'd been with since the age of 9 – and instead signed for Preston North End on a three-year contract, a move he was particularly happy with on a personal level due to him having many close friends who lived in the area. At Preston, Anyinsah made just four appearances and in 2006 he had loan spell with Bury only making two appearances. After his loan spell at Bury, he spent one season at Preston, without joining a club on loan.

=== Carlisle United and Crewe Alexandra(loan) ===
In September 2007, he joined Carlisle United on a month-long loan. He made his debut in a 1–1 draw against Bristol Rovers and the next game, he scored his first senior goal whilst with the Cumbrians in a 3–1 victory at AFC Bournemouth. Two months later while on loan, he scored a brace in a 3–0 win over Swindon Town. His impressive performance led to his loan being extended to three months, but no permanent deal came of it and he returned to Preston, despite Carlisle having wanted to sign him when the transfer window opened in January.

In early March, Anyinsah signed for Crewe Alexandra on loan, until the end of the season and made his debut in a 0–0 draw against Nottingham Forest.

=== Brighton and Hove Albion ===
On 11 September 2008, Anyinsah joined League One side Brighton & Hove Albion on loan for a month. Two days later, Anyinsah made his Brighton debut in a 1–1 draw against Yeovil Town, where he received a red card after a second bookable offence. He scored Brighton's second goal in their League Cup second round match victory against Manchester City. His impressive spell at Brighton resulted in the club wanting to sign Anyinsah on a permanent deal but the move never happened as several clubs, like Swindon Town and Carlisle United, were also chasing his signature.

=== Carlisle United (loan and permanent) ===
In January 2009, Anyinsah re-joined fellow League One side Carlisle United for an undisclosed fee. However, his move was revealed by the media and manager Greg Abbott criticised people for revealing the details of the club's transfer targets. He made his second debut for Carlisle United as a 72nd-minute substitute, scoring the winning goal in a 3–2 win over Milton Keynes Dons on 17 January. He then scored his second goal for Carlisle on 14 February 2010, against his former employers at Brighton as Carlisle ran out 2–0 winners. In the build-up to a match against his former club, Anyinsah spoke out about Brighton. Later on in his second half of the season in his Carlisle career, he scored his third goal in a 2–1 away win at Crewe. His last goal of the 2008–09 season was against Scunthorpe United, on 14 March 2009.

Anyinsah began the following season in goalscoring form at Carlisle United and scored the winner in a 2–1 win over Stockport County on 18 August 2009. He then scored against Southend United and MK Dons and added further goals against Huddersfield Town, a brace against Exeter City and Leyton Orient. After a 2–2 draw against Morecambe in the first round of FA Cup, he scored a winner, to send the club through and in the second round of FA Cup against Norwich City, he set up a goal for Vincent Péricard. However coming towards the end of the season, Anyinsah suffered a groin injury and missed three months of action. In the last game of the season, he made his last appearance, coming on as a late substitute in a 2–0 win over League One champions Norwich City. Towards the end of the season, Anyinsah, along with several players, was offered a new contract. At the end of the season, Anyinsah left Carlisle, citing his desire to earn a move closer to Bristol despite settling well in Carlisle.

=== Charlton Athletic ===
Just one day before the transfer window deadline, Anyinsah, along with Paul Benson, signed for Charlton Athletic.

==== 2010–11 season ====
Anyinsah made his Charlton debut on 11 September 2010, stepping off the substitutes' bench to score the winning goal in a 1–0 victory over Notts County. After the match, Anyinsah admitted he couldn't have dreamed for a better Charlton debut. On 23 October 2010, he scored against his former team Carlisle United; Charlton were 4–3 victors. He scored his third goal for Charlton in 3–0 hammering against Swindon Town. During a 5–1 win over Peterborough United, he suffered a groin injury and on 27 November 2010, he added another goal to his tally in the FA Cup against Luton Town and another in the return leg away at Luton, which Charlton won 3–1. However, later in the season, Anyinsah's time at Charlton was hampered by a series of injuries which restricted his first team opportunities and, following the arrival of Bradley Wright-Phillips and at the end of the season, Anyinsah left Charlton after revealing on his Twitter that he had not been offered a new contract.

=== Bristol Rovers ===
On 6 July 2011, Anyinsah signed for Bristol Rovers, returning to his hometown of Bristol. On his move, Anyinsah become the 12th signing under new manager Paul Buckle. he also had a song made about him being a football ninja at this point in his career

==== 2011–12 season ====
In the opening game of the season, he made his debut in a 3–2 win over Wimbledon. On 24 September 2011, he scored his first goal for Bristol Rovers away at Morecambe, which won the match for Rovers 3–2. After the match, manager Buckle was pleased to see him back on track from his injury and said: "We haven't seen too much of him because of injury and, as we build, get strong and get to know each other and add to the squad we will be fine. It's still all brand new and we have to keep working hard and hopefully there will be a lot more performances like (Saturday's)." 20 days later on 14 October 2011, he scored his second goal of the season in a 5–2 rout against Rotherham United at the Memorial Stadium. On 29 October he added his to his tally with a goal in the 2–0 home win over Dagenham and Redbridge. 7 days later, he scored again in the 2–1 loss away at Accrington Stanley. On 4 December 2011, he scored his last goal of the season and set up a goal in 6–1 FA Cup rout against Totton. During his first season, the club would suffer losing form, leading to Buckle's sacking but under new manager Mark McGhee, the club would eventually survive relegation. For Anyinsah in the second half of the season, he was substituted very early in the first half in a 2–1 win over Morecambe and McGhee's action was explained when he changed formation from 4–4–2 to 4–3–3. Despite this, Anyinsah praised McGhee's impact, saying, "It's been good. He's come in and he's just shaken up the place with the way he works. He's very thorough in his methods and he's got the players playing as he wants us to."

==== 2012–13 season ====
Anyinsah featured in Bristol Rovers' first game of the 2012–13 season away at Ipswich Town, but failed to score a goal. However, his goalscoring form soon faded, resulting in him being left out of the squad or being on the substitute bench. But on 10 November 2012, Anyinsah scored his first goal, on his first start of the season in eight games, in a 3–2 win over Chesterfield. Towards the end of the season, Anyinsah would score three more goals. It was confirmed on 29 April 2013 that Anyinsah would not be offered a new deal at the Memorial and will be released at the end of the 2012–2013 season.

==== Wrexham ====
Anyinsah spent time on trial with Cheltenham Town in July 2013 however he signed for Wrexham one week into the 2013–14 season after a short spell training with the club.

=== Hayes and Yeading ===
After being released by Wrexham, Anyinsah signed for Hayes and Yeading in the Conference South.

== Honours ==
Carlisle United

- Football League Trophy runner-up: 2009–10
