= Eliot Richards =

Welsh footballer (born 1991)

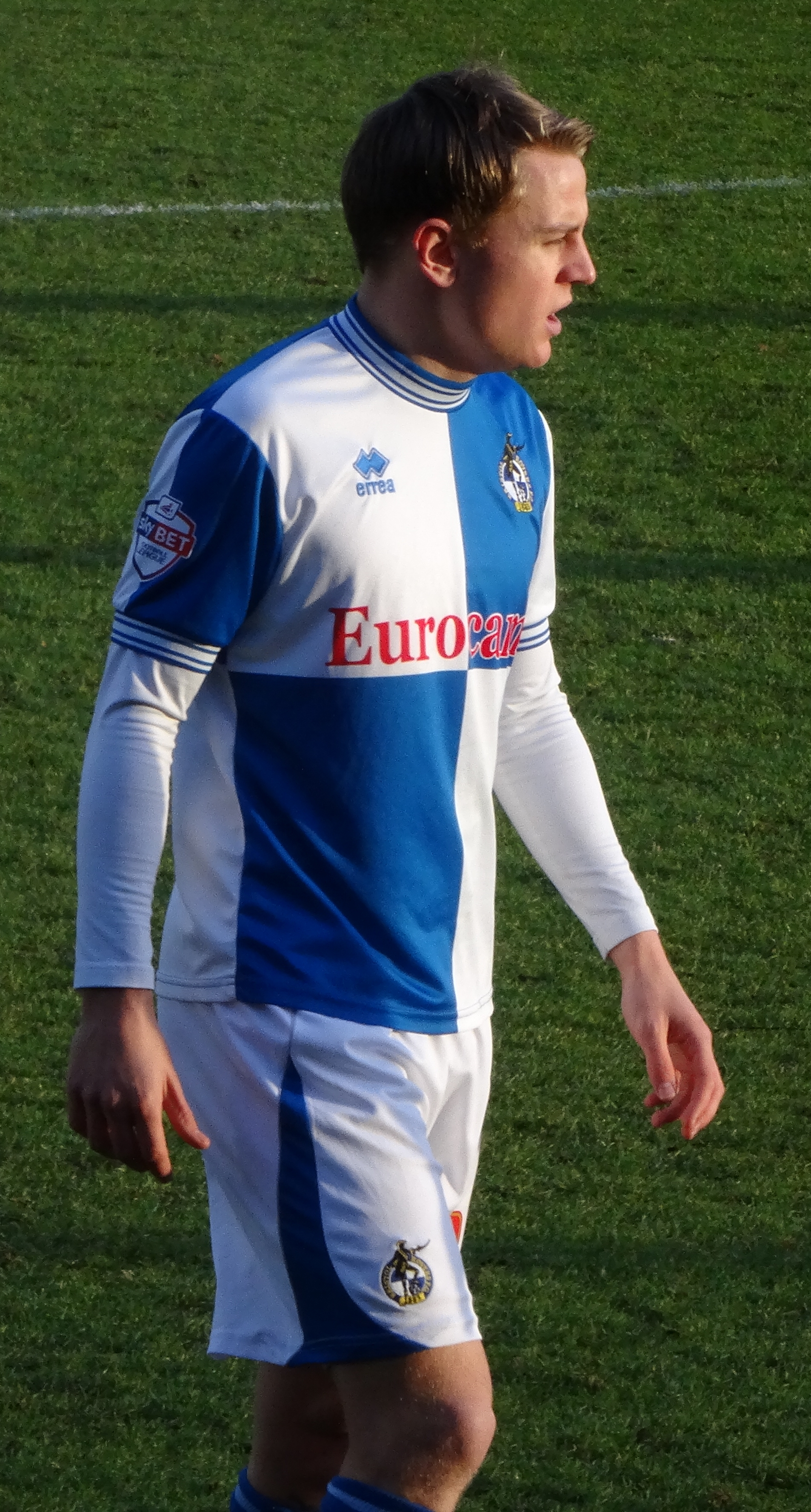
- Richards playing for Bristol Rovers in 2014

Personal information
- Full name: Eliot Allen Richards
- Date of birth: 10 September 1991 (age 35)
- Place of birth: New Tredegar, Wales
- Position: Midfielder

Senior career*
Years	Team	Apps	(Gls)
2009–2014	Bristol Rovers	112	(16)
2014	→ Exeter City (loan)	17	(5)
2014–2015	Tranmere Rovers	13	(1)
2015–2016	Cheltenham Town	9	(1)
2016	→ Bath City (loan)	9	(1)
2016	Tampa Bay Rowdies	0	(0)
2016	Weston-super-Mare	11	(0)
2016	→ Merthyr Town (loan)		
2017	Merthyr Town		
2017–2019	Hereford	61	(5)
2019–2020	Merthyr Town	21	(5)
2020–2021	Barnet	3	(1)
2021–2022	Merthyr Town	10	(2)
2022–2023	Pontypridd United	14	(1)
2023–2024	Penybont	19	(2)
2024–2026	Barry Town United	50	(4)

International career
2010	Wales U19	1	(0)
2012	Wales U21	1	(0)
- * Club domestic league appearances and goals as of 15 March 2026 (UTC)

Eliot Allen Richards (born 10 September 1991) is a Welsh former professional footballer who played as a midfielder.

== Club career ==
=== Bristol Rovers ===
A product of the Rovers youth system, Richards joined the professional ranks at the club in the summer of 2009.

He was the first of the group to break into the first team when he made his debut on 20 February 2010, when he came on as a 73rd-minute substitute for Andy Williams in a Football League One match against Gillingham.

He scored his first goal of the 2011–12 season against Leyton Orient at Portman Road on 13 August 2011, which Rovers lost 3–2. On 4 December 2011, he scored 2 goals in Rovers 6–1 FA Cup rout against Totton. On 14 April, Richards scored his first hat-trick against Burton Albion in a match Bristol Rovers won 7–1.

On 29 September 2012, Elliot Richards scored his first goal of the season in a away match at local rivals Exeter City, the goal proved to be the match winner for Bristol Rovers in a 2–1 Victory.

He received his first red card for Bristol Rovers in a 2–1 defeat away against at Rochdale.

On 6 May 2014, after Bristol Rovers were relegated to the Football Conference, he, along with 12 other players at Bristol Rovers were released from the club.

=== Exeter City (loan) ===
On 7 February 2014, Richards joined Exeter City on loan for the remainder of the 2013–14 season with Alan Gow joining Bristol Rovers on loan in the opposite direction.

=== Tranmere Rovers ===
On 28 May 2014, Richards became new Tranmere Rovers manager Rob Edwards first signing, signing a two-year deal with the club. Richards scored his first Tranmere goal on 23 August against Cheltenham Town. Richards left Tranmere on 2 February 2015 by mutual consent.

=== Cheltenham Town ===
Richards signed an 18-month deal with Cheltenham Town on 2 February 2015. He rejoined Rob Edwards, who after being sacked by Tranmere had recently been appointed as Cheltenham assistant manager.

On 28 March 2015, it was announced that Richards had been diagnosed with testicular cancer. On 4 September he has been given the all-clear in his battle with cancer and aimed to return to the pitch at Christmas.

In January 2016, Eliot joined National League South side Bath City on loan for a month.

Richards was released by Cheltenham Town in March 2016.

=== Tampa Bay Rowdies ===
On 4 April 2016, Richards signed with the Tampa Bay Rowdies of the North American Soccer League through the end of NASL spring season, with an option for the remainder of the 2016 season and the 2017 full season, linking up with former Bristol Rovers team-mate and Rowdies head coach Stuart Campbell. However, Richards did not play any games in the US before returning to the UK.

=== Non-league ===
Richards joined Weston-super-Mare in August 2016 after obtaining international clearance. Two months later he joined Southern Football League club Merthyr Town on loan until 31 December, before signing permanently in January. After ten goals in 52 appearances for the Martyrs, Richards joined league rivals Hereford in November 2017, winning promotion at the end of the season. Richards left the Bulls in August 2019 after deciding to join a new club permanently rather than play temporarily elsewhere to earn a new deal. He then re-joined Merthyr for the 2019-20 season. In July 2020, Richards agreed to remain with Merthyr for the 2020-21 season, however on 10 September 2020, Richards moved up two divisions to join National League side Barnet. In November, Richards sustained multiple injuries in Barnet's FA Cup win over Burton Albion, including tears of his anterior cruciate ligament and meniscus. He was released at the end of the season. After 13 months out injured Richards re-joined Merthyr in December 2021.

In October 2023, Richards joined Penybont following a spell with Pontypridd United. In June 2024, he joined Barry Town United. Richards was diagnosed with cancer and retired from the sport in February 2026.

== International career ==
Richards was called up to the Wales national under-19 football team in April 2010, for their squad to face Northern Ireland on 5 May.

Richards was called up to the Wales Under 21 squad for the first time in August 2012 for their match against Armenia.

== Career statistics ==
As of end of 25 November 2023

Club statistics
Club	Season	League			FA Cup		League Cup		Other		Total	
Club	Season	Division	Apps	Goals	Apps	Goals	Apps	Goals	Apps	Goals	Apps	Goals
Bristol Rovers	2009–10	League One	5	0	—		—		—		5	0
Bristol Rovers	2010–11	League One	13	1	1	0	—		3 (Note: Appearances in Football League Trophy)	0	17	1
Bristol Rovers	2011–12	League Two	32	7	3	2	1	1	1	0	37	10
Bristol Rovers	2012–13	League Two	40	6	1	0	—		1	0	42	6
Bristol Rovers	2013–14	League Two	22	2	5	2	1	1	—		28	5
Bristol Rovers	Total		112	16	10	4	2	2	5	0	129	22
Exeter City (loan)	2013–14	League Two	17	5	—		—		—		17	5
Tranmere Rovers	2014–15	League Two	13	1	1	0	1	0	1	0	16	1
Cheltenham Town	2014–15	League Two	9	1	—		—		—		9	1
Cheltenham Town	2015–16	National League	0	0	0	0	0	0	0	0	0	0
Bath City (loan)	2015–16	National League South	9	1	0	0	0	0	0	0	9	1
Tampa Bay Rowdies	2016	North American Soccer League	0	0	0	0	0	0	0	0	0	0
Weston-super-Mare	2016–17	National League South	11	0	1	1	0	0	1 (Note: One appearance and three goals in Somerset Premier Cup)	3	13	4
Merthyr Town (loan)	2016–17	SFL Premier Division	No data currently available									
Merthyr Town	2016–17	SFL Premier Division	No data currently available									
Merthyr Town	2017–18	SFL Premier Division	No data currently available									
Hereford	2017–18	SFL Premier Division	27	2	0	0	0	0	0	0	27	2
Hereford	2018–19	National League North	34	3	0	0	0	0	1 (Note: Appearances in FA Trophy)	0	35	3
Hereford	Total		61	5	0	0	0	0	1	0	62	5
Merthyr Town	2019–20	SFL Premier Division South	21	5	1	0	0	0	2	1	24	6
Barnet	2020–21	National League	3	1	2	0	0	0	0	0	5	1
Merthyr Town	2021–22	SFL Premier Division South	10	2	0	0	0	0	0	0	10	2
Pontypridd United	2022–23	Cymru Premier	14	1	1	0	0	0	0	0	15	1
Penybont	2023–24	Cymru Premier	4	0	0	0	0	0	0	0	4	0
Career total			285	38	16	5	3	2	10	4	314	49
