= Conor Gough =

English footballer

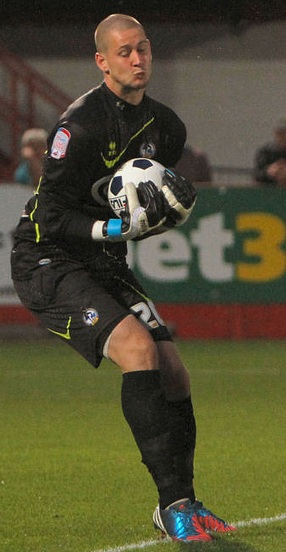

Personal information
- Full name: Conor John Joseph Gough
- Date of birth: 9 August 1993 (age 33)
- Place of birth: Ilford, England
- Height: 6 ft 7 in (2.01 m)
- Position: Goalkeeper

Team information
- Current team: Coggeshall Town

Youth career
- 2005–2010: Charlton Athletic

Senior career*
Years	Team	Apps	(Gls)
2010–2012	Charlton Athletic	0	(0)
2011	→ Lewes (loan)	1	(0)
2011	→ St Albans City (loan)	3	(0)
2011	→ Salisbury City (loan)	15	(0)
2011–2012	→ Eastbourne Borough (loan)	1	(0)
2012	→ Chelmsford City (loan)	2	(0)
2012	→ Bristol Rovers (loan)	1	(0)
2012–2014	Bristol Rovers	2	(0)
2014–2015	Grays Athletic	39	(0)
2015	Concord Rangers	3	(0)
2015–2018	Canvey Island		
2017	→ Chelmsford City (loan)	0	(0)
2018	Benfleet	2	(0)
2018–	Coggeshall Town	0	(0)
- * Club domestic league appearances and goals as of 15:33, 31 December 2018 (UTC)

Conor John Joseph Gough (born 9 August 1993 in Ilford, Essex) is an English footballer who plays as a goalkeeper for Coggeshall Town.

== Career ==
Gough started his footballing career with Charlton Athletic signing his first professional contract in 2011 after spending two years as a scholar at the club. During his time as a professional with the London club, he was loaned five times to non-League clubs in order to gain experience. After being told his contract would not be renewed, he signed a two-year deal with Bristol Rovers. Shortly after it was announced that he had joined Rovers, he was loaned to them as Rovers did not have a fit goalkeeper and made his debut in the final game of the 2011–12 season.

Gough signed for Grays Athletic at the start of the 2014–15 season and went on make 39 appearances in the Isthmian League Premier Division and 51 in all competitions. He went on to sign for Concord Rangers in May 2015, and then moved to neighbours Canvey Island in August 2015.

In November 2018, Gough left Canvey Island to sign for Coggeshall Town.
