= 2011–12 Bristol Rovers F.C. season =

Bristol Rovers
2011–12 season
- Chairman: Nick Higgs
- Manager: Paul Buckle (sacked 3 January 2012); Shaun North (caretaker until 18 January 2012); Mark McGhee
- Stadium: Memorial Stadium
- League Two: 13th
- FA Cup: 3rd round (Eliminated by Aston Villa)
- League Cup: 2nd round (Eliminated by Leyton Orient)
- Football League Trophy: 2nd round (Eliminated by Wycombe Wanderers)
- Top goalscorer: League: Matt Harrold – 16; All: Matt Harrold – 18
- Highest home attendance: 10,883 (vs. Aston Villa) 7 January 2012)
- Lowest home attendance: 3,787 (vs. Corby Town) 12 November 2011)
- Average home league attendance: 6,035
Home colours	Away colours

During 2011 and 2012, Bristol Rovers Football Club participated in League Two, the fourth level of English football. It was 129th season of football played by Bristol Rovers, and their 85th in the Football League. The previous saw Bristol Rovers end a four-year tenure in League One. Despite initial optimism of an instant return, the campaign proved disappointing as Rovers struggled for much of the season under new manager Paul Buckle before being replaced by Mark McGhee who brought about an upturn in fortunes to finish 13th.

The 2011–12 campaign saw Bristol Rovers play Burton Albion, Crawley Town and Morecambe for the first time, and featured a number of local matches against the likes of Cheltenham Town, Plymouth Argyle, Swindon Town, and Torquay United.

== Season events ==
=== May ===
- 20 May 2011 – Bristol Rovers announce that 17 players will be released at the end of their contracts at the end of June. Striker Will Hoskins is transferred to Brighton & Hove Albion for an undisclosed fee.
- 30 May 2011 – Paul Buckle is appointed manager of Bristol Rovers, after leaving the manager position of Torquay United.

=== June ===
- 6 June 2011 – Bristol Rovers sign midfielder Matthew Gill and goalkeeper Scott Bevan.
- 7 June 2011 – Bristol Rovers sign midfielder Craig Stanley from Morecambe.
- 9 June 2011 – Bristol Rovers announce plans to move to a new 20,000 capacity stadium to be based on UWE's Frenchay campus
- 11 June 2011 – Bristol Rovers defender Danny Coles leaves transferred to westcountry rivals Exeter City.
- 15 June 2011 – Bristol Rovers sign defender Adam Virgo after he rejected a new contract at Yeovil Town.
- 16 June 2011 – Bristol Rovers sign Matt Harrold from Shrewsbury Town F.C. for an undisclosed fee. Former QPR defender Lee Brown signs on a two-year deal.
- 18 June 2011 – Bristol Rovers sign Mustapha Carayol for an undisclosed fee from Lincoln City.
- 23 June 2011 – Bristol Rovers sign 22-year-old defender Michael Smith from Ballymena United in Northern Ireland.
- 29 June 2011 – Bristol Rovers complete signing of 25-year-old goalkeeper Lance Cronin and striker Scott McGleish. Dominic Blizzard departs after having his contract terminated.
- 30 June 2011 – Harry Pell left the club after rejecting Bristol Rovers' offer of a new contract.

=== July ===
- 5 July 2011 – Chris Zebroski joins Bristol Rovers for an undisclosed fee from fellow South West outfit Torquay United.
- 6 July 2011 – Bristol Rovers sign former Bristol City and Charlton Athletic player Joe Anyinsah.
- 11 July 2011 – Bristol Rovers sign striker Kayne McLaggon and re-sign Leicester City defender Cian Bolger on a six-month loan deal.
- 19 July 2011 – Defender Michael Boateng joins Bristol Rovers on a one-year deal after impressing on trial.

=== August ===
- 1 August 2011 – Matt Gill is appointed captain of Bristol Rovers whilst Adam Virgo as vice captain.
- 6 August 2011 – Bristol Rovers begin the new season with a 3–2 win away to Football League new boys AFC Wimbledon live on Sky Sports. 11 players made their debuts with Byron Anthony the only non-debutant to start while Chris Lines and Jo Kuffour came off the bench.
- 10 August 2011 – The League Cup match against Watford was postponed after a police request. This came as a result of ongoing rioting in Bristol and across England.
- 12 August 2011 – Bristol Rovers sell Chris Lines to South Yorkshire team Sheffield Wednesday for a fee believed to be in the region of £50,000.
- 13 August 2011 – Torquay United, Paul Buckle's former club, beat Bristol Rovers 2–1 on the first home game of the season.
- 23 August 2011 – Bristol Rovers progress through to the League cup second round after a 4–2 penalties win over Championship side Watford.
- 26 August 2011 – Defender Danny Woodards joins Bristol Rovers signing a one-year deal.
- 30 August 2011 – League One side Leyton Orient knock Bristol Rovers out of the League Cup following a 3–2 win for the London side.
- 31 August 2011 – Ben Swallow joined Bath City on a three-month loan deal.

=== September ===
- 6 September 2011 – Bristol Rovers lose in the Johnstone's Paint Trophy first round to Wycombe Wanderers.
- 9 September 2011 – Charlie Clough joined Bath City on a month-long loan.
- 23 September 2011 – Bristol Rovers sign Oliver Norburn on a months loan from Leicester City.
- 30 September 2011 – Jo Kuffour is loaned to Gillingham for three months.

=== October ===
- 7 October 2011 – Bristol Rovers sign Wycombe striker Scott Rendell on loan for one month.
- 11 October 2011 – Charlie Clough had his loan at Bath City extended by another month.
- 20 October 2011 – Kayne McLaggon and Michael Boateng joined Tonbridge Angels on loan, while Charlie Reece joined Gloucester City also on loan.
- 25 October 2011 – Oliver Norburn's loan with Bristol Rovers was extended until the end of 2011.

=== November ===
- 9 November 2011 – Bristol Rovers sign central midfielder Andy Dorman on loan.
- 12 November 2011 – Bristol Rovers progress through to the second round of the FA Cup with a 3–1 win against Corby Town.
- 14 November 2011 – Charlie Clough had his Bath City extended for a third straight month.
- 16 November 2011 – Ben Swallow was recalled from his Bath City loan.

=== December ===
- 4 December 2011 – Bristol Rovers hammer AFC Totton 6–1 in the FA Cup second-round match screened live on ITV.
- 20 December 2011 – Former captain and caretaker manager Stuart Campbell was released by Bristol Rovers. Michael Boateng joined Sutton United on loan for one month.

=== January ===
- 1 January 2012 – Goalkeeper Michael Poke and defender Aaron Downes joined Bristol Rovers on month long loan deals from Brighton & Hove Albion and Chesterfield respectively. Cian Bolger's loan was extended for another month.
- 3 January 2012 – Manager Paul Buckle was sacked as manager of Bristol Rovers with the club 19th in League Two. Buckle left the club having won just six league games out of 24 and winless since October in the league.
- 6 January 2012 – Bristol Rovers extend Andy Dorman's loan for another month.
- 7 January 2012 – Aston Villa beat Bristol Rovers 3–1 in the third round of the FA Cup in a match broadcast live on ESPN.
- 12 January 2012 – Jo Kuffour left Bristol Rovers on a permanent basis, joining Gillingham.
- 18 January 2012 – Bristol Rovers appointed Mark McGhee as the club's new manager on a two-and-a-half-year contract.
- 27 January 2012 – Aaron Downes, Andy Dorman and Cian Bolger all had their loans at Bristol Rovers extended until the end of the season. Goalkeeper Michael Poke has his loan extended by a further month.
- 30 January 2012 – Bristol Rovers signed Stoke City midfielder Matthew Lund on a monthlong loan. Charlie Reece joined Tamworth on loan for one month.
- 31 January 2012 – Bristol Rovers terminate Ben Swallow's contract. Jim Paterson joined Bristol Rovers until the end of the season.

=== February ===
- 9 February 2012 – Tom Parkes joined Bristol Rovers on a month's loan from Leicester City.
- 17 February 2012 – Byron Anthony joined Hereford United on loan for one month.
- 20 February 2012 – Bristol Rovers goalkeeper Lance Cronin rejoined his former club Ebbsfleet United on loan for a month.
- 24 February 2012 – Michael Poke's loan at Bristol Rovers was extended for a third and final month.
- 28 February 2012 – Bristol Rovers extend the loan of Matthew Lund from Stoke City until the end of April.

=== March ===
- 1 March 2012 – Striker Scott McGleish joined Barnet on loan for one month.
- 9 March 2012 – Planning permission for Bristol Rovers' new stadium, UWE Stadium, was submitted. Charlie Clough joined AFC Telford United on loan for one month.
- 20 March 2012 – Byron Anthony's loan at Hereford United was extended to the end of the season.
- 26 March 2012 – Ollie Clarke joined Clevedon Town on loan for the remainder of the season.

=== April ===
- 5 April 2012 – Scott McGleish's loan with Barnet was extended for the rest of the season.
- 14 April 2012 – Bristol Rovers hammer Burton Albion 7–1, the first time Rovers have scored 7 past anyone since 1973. It was also manager Mark McGhee's biggest victory of his managerial career so far.
- 27 April 2012 – Youngsters Eliot Richards and Ollie Clarke sign contracts extensions at Bristol Rovers of two years and one year respectively.

=== May ===
- 4 May 2012 – Conor Gough signed for Bristol Rovers on an emergency seven-day loan from Charlton Athletic. Rovers had already agreed to sign Gough permanently in the summer.
- 5 May 2012 – Bristol Rovers' season finished on a disappointing note, losing 4–0 to Dagenham & Redbridge. They finished 13th in the league table having picked up 57 points.

== First team ==
As of 5 May 2012.

No.	Name	Nationality	Position	Date Of Birth (Age)	Previous club	Notes
Goalkeepers
1	Scott Bevan	(England)	GK	19 September 1979 (aged 32)	Torquay United	
20	Conor Gough	(England)	GK	9 August 1993 (aged 18)	On loan from Charlton Athletic	
25	Lance Cronin	(England)	GK	11 September 1985 (aged 26)	Gillingham	
38	Matt Macey	(England)	GK	9 September 1994 (aged 17)	Youth team graduate	
Defenders
2	Michael Smith	(Northern Ireland)	DF	4 September 1988 (aged 23)	Ballymena United	
3	Gary Sawyer	(England)	DF	5 July 1985 (aged 26)	Plymouth Argyle	
4	Danny Woodards	(England)	DF	8 October 1983 (aged 28)	Milton Keynes Dons	
5	Cian Bolger	(Republic of Ireland)	DF	12 March 1992 (aged 20)	On loan from Leicester City	
14	Lee Brown	(England)	DF	10 August 1990 (aged 21)	Queens Park Rangers	
15	Byron Anthony	(Wales)	DF	20 September 1984 (aged 27)	Cardiff City	On loan at Hereford United
17	Jim Paterson	(Scotland)	DF	25 September 1979 (aged 32)	Shamrock Rovers	
19	Adam Virgo	(England)	DF	25 January 1983 (aged 29)	Yeovil Town	Vice Captain
22	Charlie Clough	(England)	DF	4 September 1990 (aged 21)	Youth team graduate	
30	Michael Boateng	(England)	DF	17 August 1991 (aged 20)	Carshalton Athletic	
33	Aaron Downes	(Australia)	DF	15 May 1985 (aged 27)	On loan from Chesterfield	
37	Tom Parkes	(England)	DF	15 January 1992 (aged 20)	On loan from Leicester City	
Midfielders
6	Craig Stanley	(England)	MF	3 March 1983 (aged 29)	Morecambe	
8	Matt Gill	(England)	MF	30 August 1980 (aged 31)	Norwich City	Captain
11	Mustapha Carayol	(The Gambia)	MF	10 June 1989 (aged 23)	Lincoln City	
16	Joe Anyinsah	(England)	MF	8 October 1984 (aged 27)	Charlton Athletic	
21	Wayne Brown	(England)	MF	6 August 1988 (aged 23)	Fulham	
23	Matthew Lund	(Northern Ireland)	MF	21 November 1990 (aged 21)	On loan from Stoke City	
24	Ollie Clarke	(England)	MF	29 June 1992 (aged 20)	Youth team graduate	On loan at Clevedon Town
29	Darren Jefferies	(England)	MF	17 October 1993 (aged 18)	Youth team graduate	
31	Shaquille Hunter	(England)	MF	29 August 1995 (aged 16)	Youth team graduate	
34	Andy Dorman	(Wales)	MF	1 May 1982 (aged 30)	On loan from Crystal Palace	
35	Jordan Goddard	(England)	MF	9 September 1993 (aged 18)	Youth team graduate	
Strikers
9	Matt Harrold	(England)	FW	25 July 1984 (aged 27)	Shrewsbury Town	
10	Scott McGleish	(England)	FW	10 February 1974 (aged 38)	Leyton Orient	On loan at Barnet
18	Eliot Richards	(Wales)	FW	10 September 1991 (aged 20)	Youth team graduate	
26	Chris Zebroski	(England)	FW	29 October 1986 (aged 25)	Torquay United	
27	Kayne McLaggon	(Wales)	FW	21 September 1990 (aged 21)	Salisbury City	
28	Lamar Powell	(England)	FW	3 September 1993 (aged 18)	Youth team graduate	
32	Mitch Harding	(England)	FW	27 January 1994 (aged 18)	Youth team graduate	

== Squad statistics ==
=== Appearances, goals and cards ===
As of 5 May 2012.

No.	Pos.	Name	League		FA Cup		League Cup		JP Trophy		Total		Discipline	
No.	Pos.	Name	Apps	Goals	Apps	Goals	Apps	Goals	Apps	Goals	Apps	Goals	Yellow card	Red card
1	GK	(England) Scott Bevan	38	0	2	0	2	0	1	0	41	0	0	0
2	DF	(Northern Ireland) Michael Smith	20	0	0	0	2	0	1	0	24	0	0	0
3	DF	(England) Gary Sawyer	24	0	3	0	0	0	0	0	27	0	1	0
4	DF	(England) Danny Woodards	39	1	3	1	1	0	1	0	44	2	4	0
5	DF	(Republic of Ireland) Cian Bolger	39	2	2	0	1	0	0	0	42	2	11	1
6	MF	(England) Craig Stanley	33	1	2	0	2	0	1	0	39	1	7	0
8	MF	(England) Matthew Gill	33	0	0	0	2	0	1	0	36	0	6	0
9	FW	(England) Matt Harrold	40	16	2	0	1	1	1	1	44	18	6	0
10	FW	(England) Scott McGleish	27	7	2	2	2	0	1	0	31	9	1	0
11	MF	(The Gambia) Mustapha Carayol	31	4	3	2	2	0	0	0	35	6	7	0
14	DF	(England) Lee Brown	41	7	3	0	2	0	1	0	47	7	3	0
15	DF	(Wales) Byron Anthony	16	1	1	1	2	0	1	0	20	2	4	0
16	MF	(England) Joe Anyinsah	31	4	2	1	0	0	0	0	32	5	2	0
17	DF	(Scotland) Jim Paterson	17	1	0	0	0	0	0	0	17	1	2	0
18	FW	(Wales) Eliot Richards	32	7	3	2	1	1	1	0	37	10	4	0
19	DF	(Scotland) Adam Virgo	9	1	0	0	2	0	0	0	11	1	1	0
20	GK	(England) Conor Gough	1	0	0	0	0	0	0	0	1	0	0	0
21	MF	(England) Wayne Brown	12	0	0	0	2	0	1	0	15	0	1	0
22	MF	(England) Charlie Clough	0	0	0	0	0	0	0	0	0	0	0	0
23	MF	(Northern Ireland) Matthew Lund	13	2	0	0	0	0	0	0	13	2	3	0
24	MF	(England) Ollie Clarke	0	0	0	0	0	0	0	0	0	0	0	0
25	GK	(England) Lance Cronin	1	0	0	0	0	0	0	0	1	0	0	0
26	FW	(England) Chris Zebroski	39	3	3	1	2	1	0	0	44	5	13	0
27	FW	(Wales) Kayne McLaggon	1	0	1	0	0	0	0	0	2	0	0	0
28	FW	(England) Lamar Powell	0	0	0	0	0	0	0	0	0	0	0	0
29	MF	(England) Darren Jefferies	0	0	1	0	0	0	0	0	1	0	0	0
30	DF	(England) Michael Boateng	0	0	0	0	0	0	1	0	1	0	0	0
31	MF	(England) Shaquille Hunter	0	0	0	0	0	0	0	0	0	0	0	0
32	DF	(England) Mitch Harding	1	0	0	0	0	0	0	0	1	0	0	0
33	MF	(Australia) Aaron Downes	8	0	1	0	0	0	0	0	9	0	1	0
34	MF	(Wales) Andy Dorman	25	2	3	0	0	0	0	0	28	2	4	0
35	MF	(England) Jordan Goddard	0	0	1	0	0	0	0	0	1	0	0	0
37	DF	(England) Tom Parkes	14	0	0	0	0	0	0	0	14	0	1	1
Players appeared for Bristol Rovers who have left:
—	MF	(England) Chris Lines	1	0	0	0	0	0	0	0	1	0	0	0
—	FW	(England) Scott Rendell	5	0	0	0	0	0	0	0	5	0	0	0
—	MF	(Scotland) Stuart Campbell	11	0	0	0	1	0	1	0	13	0	2	0
—	MF	(England) Oliver Norburn	5	0	1	0	0	0	0	0	6	0	0	0
—	FW	(Ghana) Jo Kuffour	5	1	0	0	1	0	0	0	6	1	0	0
—	MF	(Wales) Ben Swallow	0	0	1	0	0	0	0	0	1	0	0	1
—	GK	(England) Michael Poke	8	0	1	0	0	0	0	0	9	0	1	0

Updated to games played on 5 May 2012.

Source: Soccerbase

Apps = Appearances made; Goals = Goals scored.

== Competitions ==
=== Overall ===
Competition	Started round	Current position / round	Final position / round	First match	Last match
Football League Two	—	—	13th	6 August 2011	5 May 2012
Football League Cup	1st round	—	2nd round	23 August 2011	30 August 2011
Football League Trophy	1st round	—	1st round	6 September 2011	6 September 2011
FA Cup	1st round	—	3rd round	12 November 2011	7 January 2012

Updated to match played 5 May 2012
Source: Competitions

=== League Two ===
==== Standings ====
Pos	Team	Pld	W	D	L	GF	GA	GD	Pts
11	Aldershot Town	46	19	9	18	54	52	+2	66
12	Port Vale	46	20	9	17	68	60	+8	59 (Note: On 9 March Port Vale were deducted ten points for entering administration.)
13	Bristol Rovers	46	15	12	19	60	70	−10	57
14	Accrington Stanley	46	14	15	17	54	66	−12	57
15	Morecambe	46	14	14	18	63	57	+6	56

Updated to match(es) played on 5 May 2012. Source: BBC Sport
Rules for classification: 1) Points; 2) Goal difference; 3) Number of goals scored

==== Results summary ====
Overall								Home						Away					
Pld	W	D	L	GF	GA	GD	Pts	W	D	L	GF	GA	GD	W	D	L	GF	GA	GD
46	15	12	19	60	70	−10	57	10	6	7	37	29	+8	5	6	12	23	41	−18

Last updated: 5 May 2012.

==== Results by round ====
Round	1	2	3	4	5	6	7	8	9	10	11	12	13	14	15	16	17	18	19	20	21	22	23	24	25	26	27	28	29	30	31	32	33	34	35	36	37	38	39	40	41	42	43	44	45	46
Ground	A	H	H	A	H	A	A	H	H	A	H	A	H	A	H	H	A	H	A	H	A	H	H	A	A	H	A	H	H	A	H	A	H	A	A	H	A	H	A	A	H	A	H	A	H	A
Result	W	L	W	D	D	L	D	W	L	W	L	L	W	L	L	W	L	L	D	D	L	L	L	L	W	D	W	W	W	L	D	W	D	L	D	W	D	W	L	D	D	L	W	L	W	L
Position	2	11	7	8	10	14	16	12	16	12	15	17	14	14	16	15	16	17	18	18	18	18	19	19	17	18	17	16	15	15	16	16	16	16	16	14	15	14	14	14	14	15	14	15	12	13

Updated to match(es) played on 5 May 2012. Source:
A = Away; H = Home; W = Win; D = Draw; L = Loss

=== Scores Overview ===
Opposition	Home Score	Away Score	Double
Accrington Stanley	5–1	1–2	6–3
AFC Wimbledon	1–0	3–2	4–2
Aldershot Town	0–1	0–1	0–2
Barnet	0–2	0–2	0–4
Bradford City	2–1	2–2	4–3
Burton Albion	7–1	1–2	8–3
Cheltenham Town	1–3	2–0	3–3
Crawley Town	0–0	1–4	1–4
Crewe Alexandra	2–5	0–3	2–8
Dagenham & Redbridge	2–0	0–4	2–4
Gillingham	2–2	1–4	3–6
Hereford United	0–0	2–1	2–1
Macclesfield Town	0–0	0–0	0–0
Morecambe	2–1	3–2	5–3
Northampton Town	2–1	2–3	4–4
Oxford United	0–0	0–3	0–3
Plymouth Argyle	2–3	1–1	3–4
Port Vale	0–3	0–1	0–4
Rotherham United	5–2	1–0	6–2
Shrewsbury Town	1–0	0–1	1–1
Southend United	1–0	1–1	2–1
Swindon Town	1–1	0–0	1–1
Torquay United	1–2	2–2	3–4

== Matches ==
Won Drawn Lost Postponed

=== League Two ===
==== August ====
6 August 2011 Game 1	AFC Wimbledon	2–3	Bristol Rovers	Kingsmeadow
12:45	Stuart 39'; Ademeno 68'	Report	McGleish 17'; Harrold 20'; Virgo 85' (pen.)	Attendance: 4,629

13 August 2011 Game 2	Bristol Rovers	1–2	Torquay United	Memorial Stadium
15:00	Anthony 56'	Report	Atieno 11'; Howe 15' (pen.)	Attendance: 8,427

16 August 2011 Game 3	Bristol Rovers	2–1	Northampton Town	Memorial Stadium
19:45	Kuffour 29'; Harrold 75'	Report	Akinfenwa 64'	Attendance: 5,812

20 August 2011 Game 4	Macclesfield Town	0–0	Bristol Rovers	Moss Rose
15:00		Report		Attendance: 1,865

27 August 2011 Game 5	Bristol Rovers	0–0	Hereford United	Memorial Stadium
15:00		Report		Attendance: 6,342

===== September =====
3 September 2011 Game 6	Crawley Town	4–1	Bristol Rovers	Broadfield Stadium
15:00	Barnett 14', 84'; Smith 28'; Tubbs 74'	Report	L. Brown 80'	Attendance: 3,693

10 September 2011 Game 7	Bradford City	2–2	Bristol Rovers	Valley Parade
15:00	Flynn 64' (pen.) 90+3' (pen.)	Report	Harrold 40'; Richards 79'	Attendance: 10,023

13 September 2011 Game 8	Bristol Rovers	1–0	Shrewsbury Town	Memorial Stadium
19:45	Zebroski 19'	Report		Attendance: 5,065

17 September 2011 Game 9	Bristol Rovers	0–1	Aldershot Town	Memorial Stadium
15:00		Report	Rodman 36'	Attendance: 5,640

24 September 2011 Game 10	Morecambe	2–3	Bristol Rovers	Globe Arena
15:00	Price 57'; Ellison 65'	Report	Bolger 27'; Anyinsah 65'; McGleish 72'	Attendance: 2,583

===== October =====
1 October 2011 Game 11	Bristol Rovers	1–3	Cheltenham Town	Memorial Stadium
15:00	L. Brown 57'	Report	Mohamed 36'; Summerfield 43'; Spencer 48'	Attendance: 6,108

8 October 2011 Game 12	Oxford United	3–0	Bristol Rovers	Kassam Stadium
15:00	Constable 16', 84'; Leven 32' (pen.)	Report		Attendance: 9,291

14 October 2011 Game 13	Bristol Rovers	5–2	Rotherham United	Memorial Stadium
19:45	McGleish 10', 29' (pen.); Bolger 32'; L. Brown 58'; Anyinsah 88'	Report	Taylor 37'; Schofield 53'	Attendance: 5,395

22 October 2011 Game 14	Burton Albion	2–1	Bristol Rovers	Pirelli Stadium
15:00	Taylor 27'; Kee 35'	Report	Harrold 14'	Attendance: 3,094

25 October 2011 Game 15	Bristol Rovers	0–3	Port Vale	Memorial Stadium
19:45		Report	Richards 19'; Loft 37'; Rigg 85'	Attendance: 5,444

29 October 2011 Game 16	Bristol Rovers	2–0	Dagenham & Redbridge	Memorial Stadium
15:00	Anyinsah 50'; Harrold 90' (pen.)	Report		Attendance: 5,475

===== November =====
5 November 2011 Game 17	Accrington Stanley	2–1	Bristol Rovers	Crown Ground
15:00	Evans 16'; Long 30'	Report	Anyinsah 47'	Attendance: 1,643

19 November 2011 Game 18	Bristol Rovers	0–2	Barnet	Memorial Stadium
15:00		Report	McLeod 19'; Byrne 90+8'	Attendance: 5,024

26 November 2011 Game 19	Southend United	1–1	Bristol Rovers	Roots Hall
15:00	Harris 66'	Report	Harrold 77'	Attendance: 6,237

===== December =====
10 December 2011 Game 20	Bristol Rovers	1–1	Swindon Town	Memorial Stadium
15:00	Woodards 88'	Report	Caddis 37'	Attendance: 7,726

17 December 2011 Game 21	Gillingham	4–1	Bristol Rovers	Priestfield Stadium
15:00	Montrose 8'; Kedwell 45+5' (pen.), 73' (pen.); Jackman 68'	Report	Carayol 52'	Attendance: 7,750

26 December 2011 Game 22	Bristol Rovers	2–3	Plymouth Argyle	Memorial Stadium
12:00	Harrold 30' (pen.), 32'	Report	Feeney 52'; Chadwick 79'; Hemmings 90+3'	Attendance: 8,090

31 December 2011 Game 23	Bristol Rovers	2–5	Crewe Alexandra	Memorial Stadium
15:00	Harrold 9'; McGleish 48'	Report	Leitch-Smith 2'; Bolger 27' (o.g.); Powell 33', 90+3'; Artell 44'	Attendance: 5,037

===== January =====
2 January 2012 Game 24	Barnet	2–0	Bristol Rovers	Underhill Stadium
15:00	McLoed 69'; Kamdjo 80'	Report		Attendance: 2,537

10 January 2012 Game 25	Hereford United	1–2	Bristol Rovers	Edgar Street
19:45	Facey 49'	Report	L. Brown 9'; McGleish 72'	Attendance: 2,411

14 January 2012 Game 26	Bristol Rovers	0–0	Crawley Town	Memorial Stadium
15:00		Report		Attendance: 5,082

21 January 2012 Game 27	Cheltenham Town	0–2	Bristol Rovers	Whaddon Road
15:00		Report	Zebroski 60'; Richards 63'	Attendance: 5,288

28 January 2012 Game 28	Bristol Rovers	2–1	Bradford City	Memorial Stadium
15:00	L Brown 6'; Richards 55'	Report	Davies 72'	Attendance: 6,164

===== February =====
4 February 2012	Aldershot Town	P – P	Bristol Rovers	The Recreation Ground
15:00		Postponed due to a frozen pitch.

11 February 2012 Game 29	Bristol Rovers	2–1	Morecambe	Memorial Stadium
15:00	L Brown 57'; McGleish 75' (pen.)	Report	Ellison 88'	Attendance: 5,381

14 February 2012 Game 30	Shrewsbury Town	1–0	Bristol Rovers	New Meadow
19:45	Collins 86'	Report		Attendance: 4,928

18 February 2012 Game 31	Bristol Rovers	0–0	Oxford United	Memorial Stadium
15:00		Report		Attendance: 6,512

25 February 2012 Game 32	Rotherham United	0–1	Bristol Rovers	Don Valley Stadium
15:00		Report	Dorman 90+2'	Attendance: 3,937

===== March =====
4 March 2012 Game 33	Bristol Rovers	0–0	Macclesfield Town	Memorial Stadium
15:00		Report		Attendance: 5,420

6 March 2012 Game 34	Northampton Town	3–2	Bristol Rovers	Sixfields Stadium
19:45	Akinfenwa 2', 10'; Langmead 20'	Report	Stanley 66'; L. Brown 86' (pen.)	Attendance: 4,028

10 March 2012 Game 35	Torquay United	2–2	Bristol Rovers	Plainmoor
15:00	Mansell 72', 90'	Report	Harrold 45+2'; Zebroski 69'	Attendance: 3,920

17 March 2012 Game 36	Bristol Rovers	1–0	AFC Wimbledon	Memorial Stadium
15:00	Carayol 11'	Report		Attendance: 5,828

20 March 2012 Game 37	Plymouth Argyle	1–1	Bristol Rovers	Home Park
19:45	Blanchard 84'	Report	Harrold 14'	Attendance: 7,531

24 March 2012 Game 38	Bristol Rovers	1–0	Southend United	Memorial Stadium
15:00	Harrold 86' (pen.)	Report		Attendance: 6,258

27 March 2012 Game 39	Aldershot Town	1–0	Bristol Rovers	The Recreation Ground
19:45	Vincenti 43'	Report		Attendance: 2,870

31 March 2012 Game 40	Swindon Town	0–0	Bristol Rovers	County Ground
15:00		Report		Attendance: 9,645

===== April =====
6 April 2012 Game 41	Bristol Rovers	2–2	Gillingham	Memorial Stadium
15:00	Richards 59'; Carayol 80'	Report	Whelpdale 56'; Oli 90'	Attendance: 6,160

9 April 2012 Game 42	Crewe Alexandra	3–0	Bristol Rovers	Alexandra Stadium
15:00	Leitch-Smith 2'; Mellor 6'; Davis 49' (pen.)	Report		Attendance: 4,139

14 April 2012 Game 43	Bristol Rovers	7–1	Burton Albion	Memorial Stadium
15:00	Carayol 42'; Richards 46', 76', 81'; Harrold 61' (pen.), 75'; Paterson 65'	Report	Zola 54'	Attendance: 5,353

21 April 2012 Game 44	Port Vale	1–0	Bristol Rovers	Vale Park
15:00	Richards 23'	Report		Attendance: 4,066

28 April 2012 Game 45	Bristol Rovers	5–1	Accrington Stanley	Memorial Stadium
15:00	Harrold 11', 22'; Dorman 29'; Lund 58', 78'	Report	McIntyre 38'	Attendance: 7,073

===== May =====
5 May 2012 Game 46	Dagenham & Redbridge	4–0	Bristol Rovers	Victoria Road
15:00	Woodall 24', 54', 81'; Green 64'	Report		Attendance: 2,377

=== FA Cup ===
12 November 2011 First round	Bristol Rovers	3–1	Corby Town	Memorial Stadium
15:00	McGleish 26' (pen.); Carayol 74'; Zebroski 90'	Report	Reynolds 62'	Attendance: 3,787; Referee: Andy Davies

4 December 2011 Second round	AFC Totton	1–6	Bristol Rovers	Testwood Stadium
12:30	Sherborne 71'	Report	Anyinsah 8'; Carayol 10'; Woodards 13'; Anthony 64'; Richards 72' 90+2'	Attendance: 2,236; Referee: Andy Woolmer

7 January 2012 Third round	Bristol Rovers	1–3	Aston Villa	Memorial Stadium
17:30	McGleish 90'	Report	Albrighton 35'; Agbonlahor 64'; Clark 78'	Attendance: 10,883; Referee: Howard Webb

=== Football League Cup ===
10 August 2011 First round	Bristol Rovers	P – P	Watford	Memorial Stadium
19:45		Postponed at the request of the police.

23 August 2011 First round	Bristol Rovers	1–1 (a.e.t.) (4–2 p)	Watford	Memorial Stadium
19:45	Harrold 5'		Sordell 2'	Attendance: 4,432
	Penalties
	Kuffour (penalty scored); McGleish (penalty missed); Virgo (penalty scored); Brown (penalty scored); Carayol (penalty scored)		Eustace (penalty missed); Sordell (penalty scored); Mariappa (penalty scored); Dickinson (penalty missed)

30 August 2011 Second round	Leyton Orient	3–2	Bristol Rovers	Matchroom Stadium
19:45	Mooney 18'; Chorley 23' (pen.); Dawson 90+4'		Zebroski 69'; Richards 90+1'	Attendance: 1,881

=== Football League Trophy ===
6 September 2011 First round	Wycombe Wanderers	3–1	Bristol Rovers	Adams Park
	Beavon 9', 57', 76'		Harrold 58'	Attendance: 771

=== Pre-season friendlies ===
6 July 2011	Mangotsfield United	1–5	Bristol Rovers	Mangotsfield
20:00 GMT	Knighton 39'	Report	L Brown 29'; McGleish 43'; Richards 68'; Swallow 71', 84'	Stadium: Cossham Street Stadium; Attendance: 1,169

8 July 2011	Bath City	0–2	Bristol Rovers	Bath
19:45 GMT			Anyinsah 6'; Brown 61'	Stadium: Twerton Park; Attendance: 1,200

11 July 2011	Salisbury City	2–5	Bristol Rovers	Salisbury
19:45 GMT	Sawyer 77'; Wright 90'		Bolger 29', 30'; Anyinsah 38'; McGleish 47'; Zebroski 66'	Stadium: Raymond McEnhill Stadium; Attendance: 603

14 July 2011	Bristol Rovers	2–2	Inverness Caledonian Thistle	Bath
19:45 GMT	McGleish 26' (pen.); McLaggon 72'	Report	Ross 50', 80'	Stadium: Twerton Park; Attendance: 841

19 July 2011	Bristol Rovers	2–0	Burnley	Bristol
19:45	Harrold 23'; Richards 64'	Report		Stadium: Memorial Stadium; Attendance: 2,500

21 July 2011	Weston-super-Mare	0–2	Bristol Rovers	Weston-super-Mare
		Report	Lines 14'; McLaggon 32'	Stadium: Woodspring Stadium

26 July 2011	Bristol Rovers	1–2	Reading	Bristol
19:45	Kuffour 3'	Report	Robson-Kanu 63'; Obita 80'	Stadium: Memorial Stadium; Attendance: 3,309

30 July 2011	Gloucester City	2–3	Bristol Rovers	Cheltenham
	Mann 10'; Edwards 45'	Report	Virgo 8'; Anthony 23'; McGleish 75'	Stadium: Whaddon Road; Attendance: 425

1 August 2011	Bitton	2–1	Bristol Rovers	Bitton
	Jones 15'; Clark 17'	Report	Richards	Stadium: The Recreation Ground

== Transfers ==
=== In ===
Date	Name	From	Fee	Ref
6 June 2011	Scott Bevan	(Torquay United)	Free	
6 June 2011	Matt Gill	(Norwich City)	Free	
7 June 2011	Craig Stanley	(Morecambe)	Free	
15 June 2011	Adam Virgo	(Yeovil Town)	Free	
16 June 2011	Matt Harrold	Shrewsbury Town	Undisclosed	
17 June 2011	Lee Brown	(QPR)	Free	
18 June 2011	Mustapha Carayol	Lincoln City	Undisclosed	
23 June 2011	Michael Smith	Ballymena United		
29 June 2011	Lance Cronin	(Gillingham)	Free	
29 June 2011	Scott McGleish	(Leyton Orient)	Free	
4 July 2011	Chris Zebroski	Torquay United	Undisclosed	
6 July 2011	Joe Anyinsah	(Charlton Athletic)	Free	
11 July 2011	Kayne McLaggon	(Salisbury City)	Free	
19 July 2011	Michael Boateng	(Carshalton Athletic)	Free	
26 August 2011	Danny Woodards	(Milton Keynes Dons)	Free	
31 January 2012	Jim Paterson	Shamrock Rovers	Free	

=== Loans in ===
Date from	Name	From	Date until	Ref
11 July 2011	Cian Bolger	Leicester City	End of season	
23 September 2011	Oliver Norburn	Leicester City	31 December 2011	
7 October 2011	Scott Rendell	Wycombe Wanderers	7 November 2011	
10 November 2011	Andy Dorman	Crystal Palace	End of season	
1 January 2012	Aaron Downes	Chesterfield	End of season	
1 January 2012	Michael Poke	Brighton & Hove Albion	1 March 2012	
30 January 2012	Matty Lund	Stoke City	30 April 2012	
9 February 2012	Tom Parkes	Leicester City	End of season	

=== Out ===
Date	Name	To	Fee	Ref
20 May 2011	Will Hoskins	Brighton & Hove Albion	Undisclosed	
11 June 2011	Danny Coles	Exeter City	Free	
30 June 2011	Carl Regan	(Shrewsbury Town)	Released	
30 June 2011	Darryl Duffy	(Cheltenham Town)	Released	
30 June 2011	Jeff Hughes	(Notts County)	Released	
30 June 2011	Mike Green	(Eastleigh)	Released	
30 June 2011	Jean-Paul Kalala	(Southend United)	Released	
30 June 2011	Gavin Williams	(Yeovil Town)	Released	
30 June 2011	Jerel Ifil	(Kettering Town)	Released	
30 June 2011	Danny Senda	(Barnet)	Released	
30 June 2011	Harry Pell	(Hereford United)	Contract rejected	
29 June 2011	Dominic Blizzard	(Yeovil Town)	Mutual consent	
11 August 2011	Chris Lines	Sheffield Wednesday	£50,000	
20 December 2011	Stuart Campbell	Tampa Bay Rowdies	Released	
13 January 2012	Jo Kuffour	Gillingham	Undisclosed	
31 January 2012	Ben Swallow	York City	Free	

=== Loans out ===
Date from	Name	To	Date until	Ref
31 August 2011	Ben Swallow	Bath City	16 November 2011	
9 September 2011	Charlie Clough	Bath City	9 October 2011	
30 September 2011	Jo Kuffour	Gillingham	30 December 2011	
20 October 2011	Kayne McLaggon	Tonbridge Angels	20 November 2011	
20 October 2011	Michael Boateng	Tonbridge Angels	20 November 2011	
20 October 2011	Charlie Reece	Gloucester City	20 November 2011	
20 December 2011	Michael Boateng	Sutton United		
30 January 2012	Charlie Reece	Tamworth	28 February 2012	
18 February 2012	Byron Anthony	Hereford United	18 March 2012	
20 February 2012	Lance Cronin	Ebbsfleet United	End of season	
1 March 2012	Scott McGleish	Barnet	1 April 2012	
9 March 2012	Charlie Clough	AFC Telford United	9 April 2012	

== Awards ==
End of Season Awards	Winner
Supporters Club Player of the Year	Danny Woodards
Young Player of the Year	Eliot Richards
Alan Lacock Youth Team Player of the Year	Mitch Harding
Goal of the Season	Mustapha Carayol vs Burton Albion

== See also ==
- 2011–12 in English football
- 2011–12 Football League Two
- List of Bristol Rovers F.C. seasons
