= 2010–11 Bristol Rovers F.C. season =

Bristol Rovers
2010–11 season
- Chairman: Nick Higgs
- Manager: Paul Trollope (until 15 December 2010); Darren Patterson (caretaker manager); Dave Penney (from 10 January 2011)
- League One: 22nd (Relegated)
- FA Cup: First round (Eliminated by Darlington
- League Cup: First round (Eliminated by Oxford United)
- Football League Trophy: Southern Section area semi-final (Eliminated by Exeter City)
- Top goalscorer: League: All: Will Hoskins – 20
- Highest home attendance: 8340 (vs. Sheffield Wednesday, 30 April 2011)
- Lowest home attendance: 4829 (vs. Milton Keynes Dons, 2 February 2011)
- Average home league attendance: 6253
Home colours	Away colours

The 2010–11 season was Bristol Rovers fourth season in League One since being promoted via the League Two play-offs in 2006–07. Bristol Rovers had a poor season and on 30 April 2011, they were relegated to League Two after a 1–1 draw with Sheffield Wednesday. Bristol Rovers 2010–11 season officially began on 1 July 2010 and concluded on 30 June 2011, with competitive fixtures taking place between August and May.

== Season events ==
- 15 December 2010 – Bristol Rovers manager Paul Trollope is sacked by Bristol Rovers after 5 seasons in charge of the club.
- 10 January 2011 – Bristol Rovers appoint Dave Penney as their new manager.
- 7 March 2011 – Bristol Rovers sack manager Dave Penney and leaves the club languishing 23rd in the League One table, five points from safety.
- 7 March 2011 – Bristol Rovers sign 20-year-old Bermudan international Reggie Lambe on loan from Ipswich Town until the end of the season.
- 7 May 2011 – On 30 April 2011, Bristol Rovers were relegated to League Two after a 2–1 defeat away at Colchester United.

== Competitions ==
=== Overall ===
Competition	Started round	Current position / round	Final position / round	First match	Last match
Football League One	—	—	22nd	7 August 2010	7 May 2011
Football League Cup	1st round	—	1st round	10 August 2010	
Football League Trophy	1st round	—	1st round	4 September 2011	
FA Cup	1st round	—	1st round	6 November 2010	

Updated to match played 30 May 2015
Source: Competitions

=== Football League One ===
==== Standings ====
Pos	Team	Pld	W	D	L	GF	GA	GD	Pts	Promotion, qualification or relegation
20	Walsall	46	12	12	22	56	75	−19	48	
21	Dagenham & Redbridge (R)	46	12	11	23	52	70	−18	47	Relegation to Football League Two
22	Bristol Rovers (R)	46	11	12	23	48	82	−34	45	Relegation to Football League Two
23	Plymouth Argyle (R)	46	15	7	24	51	74	−23	42 (Note: Plymouth Argyle deducted 10 points for insolvency.)	Relegation to Football League Two
24	Swindon Town (R)	46	9	14	23	50	72	−22	41	Relegation to Football League Two

Updated to match(es) played on 2 May 2011. Source: BBC
Rules for classification: 1) points; 2) goal difference; 3) number of goals scored.
(R) Relegated

==== Results summary ====
Overall								Home						Away					
Pld	W	D	L	GF	GA	GD	Pts	W	D	L	GF	GA	GD	W	D	L	GF	GA	GD
46	11	12	23	48	82	−34	45	6	7	10	24	35	−11	5	5	13	24	47	−23

Last updated: 2 April 2011.
Source: BRFC League One Results

==== Result round by round ====
Round	1	2	3	4	5	6	7	8	9	10	11	12	13	14	15	16	17	18	19	20	21	22	23	24	25	26	27	28	29	30	31	32	33	34	35	36	37	38	39	40	41	42	43	44	45	46
Ground	A	H	A	H	A	H	A	H	H	A	A	H	A	H	A	H	A	A	A	A	H	H	A	H	H	A	H	H	A	A	H	A	H	H	A	H	A	H	A	H	H	A	H	A	H	A
Result	L	W	D	L	D	D	W	W	L	W	L	W	D	D	L	L	D	D	L	L	L	D	L	D	W	L	L	L	L	L	W	L	L	L	W	L	W	D	W	W	L	L	D	L	D	L
Position	23	13	17	19	17	17	15	13	15	9	15	9									21	22	22	22	21	22	22	23	23	24	23	22	22	23	22	23	22	22	22	19	20	21	22	22	22	22

A = Away; H = Home; W = Win; D = Draw; L = Loss

=== Penalties awarded ===
Date	Success?	Penalty Taker	Opponent	Competition
18–09–10	✓	(Northern Ireland) Jeff Hughes	Dagenham and Redbridge	League One
11–10–10	✓	(Northern Ireland) Jeff Hughes	Swindon Town F.C.	League One
16–10–10	✓	(Northern Ireland) Jeff Hughes	Rochdale	League One
5–4–11	✓	(Northern Ireland) Jeff Hughes	Bournemouth	League One
30–4–11	✓	(Northern Ireland) Jeff Hughes	Sheffield Wednesday	League One

== Season statistics ==
=== Appearances, goals and cards ===
As of 9 May 2011.

No.	Pos.	Name	League		FA Cup		League Cup		JP Trophy		Total		Discipline	
No.	Pos.	Name	Apps	Goals	Apps	Goals	Apps	Goals	Apps	Goals	Apps	Goals	Yellow card	Red card
1	GK	(England) Mikkel Andersen	19	0	0	0	0	0	3	0	22	0	1	0
1	GK	(England) Luke Daniels	9	0	0	0	0	0	0	0	9	0	1	0
2	DF	(England) Carl Regan	20	0	1	0	1	0	3	0	25	0	1	4
3	DF	(England) Gary Sawyer	37	0	1	0	1	0	3	0	42	0	11	1
4	MF	(England) Chris Lines	42	3	1	0	1	1	2	1	46	5	12	0
5	DF	(England) Danny Coles	37	0	1	0	0	0	3	0	41	0	9	2
6	DF	(England) James Tunnicliffe	25	0	1	0	2	0	1	0	27	0	1	0
7	MF	(England) Stuart Campbell	37	0	0	0	1	0	3	0	41	0	7	0
8	FW	(England) Will Hoskins	43	17	1	1	1	0	2	2	47	20	3	0
9	FW	(England) John Akinde	14	0	1	0	2	0	3	0	29	0	3	0
9	FW	(England) Rene Howe	12	1	0	0	0	0	0	0	12	1	0	0
10	FD	(Scotland) Darryl Duffy	3	0	0	0	0	0	0	0	3	0	0	0
11	MF	(Northern Ireland) Jeff Hughes	42	10	1	0	1	0	2	1	46	11	6	0
13	GK	(England) Mike Green	2	0	1	0	1	0	0	0	4	0	1	0
14	MF	(England) Wayne Brown	24	3	1	0	0	0	2	0	27	3	2	0
15	DF	(Wales) Byron Anthony	37	3	1	0	1	0	3	0	42	3	10	0
16	MF	(England) Dominic Blizzard	5	0	0	0	1	0	1	0	7	0	0	0
17	FW	(England) Jo Kuffour	42	6	1	0	1	0	2	3	46	9	0	0
18	FW	(Wales) Eliot Richards	13	1	1	0	0	0	3	0	17	1	0	0
19	DF	(England) Mark Wright	0	0	0	0	0	0	0	0	0	0	0	0
19	DF	(England) Cian Bolger	6	0	0	0	0	0	0	0	6	0	2	1
19	MF	(Bermuda) Reggie Lambe	7	0	0	0	0	0	0	0	7	0	0	0
20	MF	(England) Charlie Reece	14	0	1	0	1	0	2	0	18	0	0	0
21	MF	(England) Charlie Clough	2	0	0	0	0	0	0	0	2	0	0	0
22	MF	(England) Harry Pell	10	0	0	0	0	0	0	0	10	0	2	0
23	FW	(Wales) Ben Swallow	17	0	1	0	1	0	2	2	21	2	1	0
24	MF	(England) Ollie Clarke	1	0	0	0	0	0	0	0	1	0	0	0
25	MF	(England) George Booth	0	0	0	0	0	0	0	0	0	0	0	0
26	DF	(England) Mark Cooper	0	0	0	0	0	0	0	0	0	0	0	0
27	MF	(England) Jack McKenna	0	0	0	0	0	0	0	0	0	0	0	0
28	FW	(England) Lamar Powell	1	0	0	0	0	0	0	0	1	0	0	0
29	DF	(England) Darren Jefferies	0	0	0	0	0	0	0	0	0	0	0	0
31	DF	(Scotland) David McCracken	10	0	0	0	0	0	0	0	10	0	0	1
33	MF	(Republic of Ireland) Scott Davies	7	0	0	0	0	0	0	0	0	0	0	0
34	MF	(Democratic Republic of the Congo) Jean-Paul Kalala	11	0	0	0	0	0	0	0	11	0	2	0
35	MF	(Wales) Gavin Williams	19	2	0	0	0	0	0	0	19	2	3	0
36	GK	(Republic of Ireland) Conrad Logan	16	0	0	0	0	0	0	0	16	0	0	0
37	DF	(England) Danny Senda	15	0	0	0	0	0	0	0	15	0	3	0
38	DF	(England) Jerel Ifil	3	0	0	0	0	0	0	0	3	0	0	1
42	FW	(Wales) Ellis Harrison	1	0	0	0	0	0	0	0	1	0	0	0

Updated to games played on 7 May 2011.

Source: Soccerbase

Apps = Appearances made; Goals = Goals scored.

=== Goalscorers ===
No.	Flag	Pos	Name	League One	League Cup	FA Cup	JPT	Total
8	(England)	FW	Will Hoskins	17	1	0	3	21
11	(England)	MF	Jeff Hughes	10	0	0	1	11
4	(England)	MF	Chris Lines	3	0	1	1	5
15	(Wales)	DF	Byron Anthony	3	0	0	0	3
14	(England)	MF	Wayne Brown	3	0	0	0	3'
23	(Wales)	MF	Ben Swallow	0	0	0	2	2
35	(Wales)	FW	Gavin Williams	0	0	0	1	2
9	(England)	FW	Rene Howe	1	0	0	0	1

== Awards ==
=== Club awards ===
At the end of the season, Bristol Rovers held annual awards dinner. Rewards received were for the players and backroom staff, for instance such as Player of the Year, Young Player of the Year, Youth Player of the Year, Goal of the Season and Clubman of the Year. The event was held at The Memorial Stadium, the supporters and the supporters club were all in attendance.

Player of the Year	(Scotland) Stuart Campbell
Young Player of the Year	(England) Harry Pell
Youth Player of the Year	(England) Darren Jefferies
Goal of the Season	(Wales) Ben Swallow (vs. Wycombe Wanderers, 9 November 2010)
Clubman of the Year	(England) Keith Brookman

== Transfers ==
=== In ===
Pos.	Name	From	Fee
MF	Harry Pell	Charlton Athletic	Free
DF	Gary Sawyer	Plymouth Argyle	Free
FW	Will Hoskins	Watford	Free
DF	James Tunnicliffe	Brighton & Hove Albion	Loan
MF	Wayne Brown	Fulham	Free
GK	Mikkel Andersen	Reading	Loan
FW	John Akinde	Bristol City	Loan
GK	Luke Daniels	West Brom	Loan

=== Out ===
Pos.	Name	To	Fee
MF	Sean Rigg	Port Vale	Free
FW	Andy Williams	Yeovil Town	Free
DF	Steve Elliott	Cheltenham Town	Free
MF	Mark Wright	Shrewsbury Town	Loan
GK	Rhys Evans	Southend United	Free
FW	Darryl Duffy	Hibernian	Loan
MF	Ollie Clarke	Gloucester City	Loan
MF	Charlie Clough	Newport County	Loan

== Fixtures and results ==
Won Drawn Lost Postponed

=== Pre-season friendlies ===
14 Jul 2010	Bath City	2–0	Bristol Rovers	Twerton Park
15:00 BST				Attendance: 1,067

07 Aug 2010	Greenock Morton	1–3	Bristol Rovers	Cappielow Stadium
15:00 BST				Attendance: 1,037

07 Aug 2010	Partic Thistle	0–2	Bristol Rovers	Firhill Stadium
15:00 BST				Attendance: 936

=== League One ===
7 Aug 2010 Game 1	Peterborough United	3–0	Bristol Rovers	London Road Stadium
15:00	Boyd 57'; McLean 73'; McCann 88'	Report		Attendance: 7,113; Referee: Gavin Ward

14 Aug 2010 Game 2	Bristol Rovers	2–1	Yeovil Town	The Memorial Stadium
15:00	Kuffour 45'; Anthony 90'		Kalala (red card) 81'; Virgo 89'	Attendance: 6,438; Referee: Michael Oliver

21 Aug 2010 Game 3	Exeter City	2–2	Bristol Rovers	St James Park
15:00	Nardiello 9'; Duffy (red card) 48'; O'Flynn 75' (pen.)		Kuffour 45'; Hoskins 54'	Attendance: 7,401; Referee: Mike Russell

28 Aug 2010 Game 4	Bristol Rovers	0–4	Southampton	The Memorial Stadium
15:00			Fonte 10'; Lallana 34'; Lambert 59' (pen.); Barnard 90'	Attendance: 8,226; Referee: Graham Scott

==== September ====
4 Sep 2010 Game 5	Oldham Athletic	1–1	Bristol Rovers	Boundary Park
15:00	Taylor 45'		Hoskins 8'; Coles (red card) 86'	Attendance: 4,039; Referee: Geoff Eltringham

11 Sep 2010 Game 6	Bristol Rovers	0–0	Brentford	The Memorial Stadium
15:00	Sawyer (red card) 70'			Attendance: 5,609; Referee: Scott Mathieson

18 Sep 2010 Game 7	Dag & Red	0–3	Bristol Rovers	Victoria Road
15:00			Hughes	Attendance: 2,287; Referee: Trevor Kettle

25 Sep 2010 Game 8	Bristol Rovers	2–1	Notts County	The Memorial Stadium
15:00	Hoskins 5', 56'		Lee (red card) 39'; Davies 87'	Attendance: 5,962; Referee: Dean Whitestone

28 Sep 2010 Game 9	Bristol Rovers	0–1	Tranmere Rovers	The Memorial Stadium
19:45			Jennings 45'	Attendance: 5,589; Referee: Chris Sarginson

==== October ====
2 Oct 2010 Game 10	Huddersfield Town	0–1	Bristol Rovers	Galpharm Stadium
15:00	McCombe (red card) 89'		Hoskins 90'	Attendance: 12,344; Referee: Karl Evans

11 Oct 2010 Game 11	Swindon Town	2–1	Bristol Rovers	County Ground
19:45	Morrison 45'; Péricard 57'		Hughes 90' (pen.)	Attendance: 9,065; Referee: Anthony Taylor

16 Oct 2010 Game 12	Bristol Rovers	2–1	Rochdale	The Memorial Stadium
15:00	Hughes 45' (pen.); Lines 82'		Anthony 86' (o.g.)	Attendance: 5,872; Referee: Craig Pawson

23 Oct 2010 Game 13	Hartlepool United	2–2	Bristol Rovers	Victoria Park
15:00	Gamble 30'; Antony Sweeney 80'		Kuffour 85'; Anthony 90'	Attendance: 2,972; Referee: Mark Haywood

30 Oct 2010 Game 14	Bristol Rovers	1–1	Carlisle United	The Memorial Stadium
15:00	Lines 48'		Grella 87'	Attendance: 6,144; Referee: Oliver Langford

==== November ====
2 Nov 2010 Game 15	Plymouth Argyle	3–1	Bristol Rovers	Home Park
19:45	Parrett 64'; Wright-Phillips 77', 90'		Hoskins 67'	Attendance: 7,413; Referee: Rob Shoebridge

13 Nov 2010 Game 16	Bristol Rovers	0–3	Leyton Orient	The Memorial Stadium
15:00	Regan (red card) 38'		Cox 20', Revell 27', 51'	Attendance: 5,541; Referee: Andy Woolmer

20 Nov 2010 Game 17	Brighton & Hove Albion	2–2	Bristol Rovers	Withdean Stadium
15:00	Hughes 62' (o.g.), Wood 73' (pen.)		Anthony 23', Painter 90' (o.g.)	Attendance: 7,407; Referee: Keith Stroud

23 Nov 2010 Game 18	Charlton Athletic	1–1	Bristol Rovers	The Valley
19:45	Benson 77'		Brown 63'	Attendance: 13,468; Referee: Mike Russell

==== December ====
11 Dec 2010 Game 19	Sheffield Wednesday	6–2	Bristol Rovers	Hillsborough
15:00	Sedgwick 10'; Miller 23'; Teale 26'; Johnson 32'; O'Connor 71'; Heffernan 81'		Hoskins 7', 66'	Attendance: 19,242

==== January ====
1 Jan 2011 Game 20	MK Dons	2–0	Bristol Rovers	Stadium:mk
15:00	Powell 10'; Leven 13'			Attendance: 7,185; Referee: Andy Woolmer

4 Jan 2011 Game 21	Bristol Rovers	2–3	Plymouth Argyle	The Memorial Stadium
19:45	Hoskins 8', 11'		Wright-Phillips 58'; Mason 69'; Zubar 81'	Attendance: 5,943; Referee: Russell Booth

11 Jan 2011 Game 22	Bristol Rovers	2–2	Walsall	The Memorial Stadium
19:45	Hoskins 53'; Kuffour 54'		Grigg 5'; Lescott 83'	Attendance: 5,369; Referee: Simon Hooper

15 Jan 2011 Game 23	Carlisle United	4–0	Bristol Rovers	Brunton Park
15:00	Berrett 44' (pen.), 82' (pen.); Curran 57'; Cooper 73'		Coles (red card) 51'	Attendance: 4,229; Referee: Paul Tierney

18 Jan 2011 Game 24	Bristol Rovers	0–0	Hartlepool United	Memorial Stadium
19:45				Attendance: 5,285; Referee: Darren Sheldrake

22 Jan 2011 Game 25	Bristol Rovers	3–1	Swindon Town	Memorial Stadium
15:00	Hoskins 7', Kuffour 48', Hughes 73'		McGovern 67'	Attendance: 6,972; Referee: Jon Moss

29 Jan 2011	Walsall	6–1	Bristol Rovers	Bescot Stadium
15:00	Butler 17', 73'; Gill 34'; Gray 45'; Richards 50'; Nicholls 69'		Hughes 49'	Attendance: 4,023; Referee: Iain Williamson

==== February ====
2 Feb 2011 Game 27	Bristol Rovers	1–2	Milton Keynes Dons	Memorial Stadium
19:45	Hughes 83' (pen.)		O'Hanlon 1' (red card) 67'; Powell 61'	Attendance: 4,829; Referee: Roger East

5 Feb 2011 Game 28	Bristol Rovers	2–4	Brighton & Hove Albion	Memorial Stadium
15:00	Hoskins 2', 86'		Barnes 38'; Bennett 52'; Bolger 73' (o.g.); Murray 79'	Attendance: 6,683; Referee: Pat Miller

8 Feb 2011 Game 29	Rochdale	3–1	Bristol Rovers	Spotland Stadium
19:45	Dawson 72'; Akpa Akpro 90'; Done 90'		Hoskins 79'; Bolger (red card) 76'	Attendance: 2,372; Referee: Bobby Madley

12 Feb 2011 Game 30	Leyton Orient	4–1	Bristol Rovers	Brisbane Road
15:00	Smith 5'; Whing 16'; Kane 77', 82'		Chorley 52' (o.g.)	Attendance: 4,913; Referee: Nigel Miller

19 Feb 2011 Game 31	Bristol Rovers	1–0	Oldham Athletic	Memorial Stadium
15:00	Rene Howe 73'			Attendance: 5,379; Referee: Phil Crossley

26 Feb 2011 Game 32	Brentford	1–0	Bristol Rovers	Griffin Park
15:00	Gary Alexander 20'			Attendance: 5,944; Referee: Craig Pawson

==== March ====
1 March 2011 Game 33	Bristol Rovers	0–1	Colchester United	Memorial Stadium
15:00			Kayode Odejayi 22'	Attendance: 5,181; Referee: Michael Naylor

5 March 2011 Game 34	Bristol Rovers	0–2	Dagenham and Redbridge	Memorial Stadium
15:00			Danny Green 45+2'; Romain Vincelot 45+2'	Attendance: 5,181; Referee: Carl Boyeson

8 March 2011 Game 35	Tranmere Rovers	0–1	Bristol Rovers	Prenton Park
19:45			Chris Lines 19'	Attendance: 4,110; Referee: Chris Sarginson

12 March 2011 Game 36	Bristol Rovers	0–1	Huddersfield Town	Memorial Stadium
15:00			Jordan Rhodes 5'	Attendance: 7,380; Referee: Brendan Malone

19 March 2011 Game 37	Notts County	0–1	Bristol Rovers	Meadow Lane
15:00			Will Hoskins 62'	Attendance: 5,691; Referee: Danny McDermid

25 March 2011 Game 38	Bristol Rovers	2–2	Peterborough United	Memorial Stadium
15:00	George Boyd 53'		Jo Kuffour 6'; Jeff Hughes 57'	Attendance: 6,589; Referee: Keith Stroud

==== April ====
2 April 2011 Game 39	Yeovil Town	0–1	Bristol Rovers	Huish Park
15:00			Gavin Williams	Attendance: 6,281; Referee: Neil Swarbrick

5 April 2011 Game 40	Bristol Rovers	1–0	Bournemouth	Memorial Stadium
19:45	Jeff Hughes penalty 33			Attendance: 6,691; Referee: Graham Salisbury

9 April 2011 Game 41	Bristol Rovers	0–2	Exeter City	Memorial Stadium
15:00			Daniel Nardiello 82'	Attendance: 7,500; Referee: Jon Moss

16 April 2011 Game 42	Southampton	1–0	Bristol Rovers	St Mary's Stadium
15:00	do Prado 82'			Attendance: 23,647

23 April 2011 Game 43	Bristol Rovers	2–2	Charlton Athletic	Memorial Stadium
15:00

25 April 2011 Game 44	Bournemouth	2–1	Bristol Rovers	Dean Court
	Mathieu Baudry 84 Steve Fletcher 88		Wayne Brown 4	Attendance: 7,869; Referee: Dean Whitestone

30 April 2011 Game 45	Bristol Rovers	1–1	Sheffield Wednesday	Memorial Stadium
15:00	Hoskins 12' (pen.)	Report	Miller 3' (pen.)	Attendance: 8,340; Referee: Dave Foster

==== May ====
7 May 2011 Game 46	Colchester United	2–1	Bristol Rovers	Weston Homes Community Stadium
15:00				Attendance: 4,759; Referee: David Webb

=== League Cup ===
10 Aug 2010 First round	Oxford United	6–1	Bristol Rovers	Kassam Stadium, Oxford
19:45 BST	Heslop 18', 90'; Green 23'; Constable 27', 52'; Midson 29'		Lines 24'	Attendance: 5,008; Referee: Fred Graham

=== Football League Trophy ===
05 Oct 2010 Southern Section second round	Bristol Rovers	1–0	Aldershot Town	The Memorial Stadium
19:15 BST	Hoskins 90'			Attendance: 4,050; Referee: Phil Gibbs

09 Nov 2010 Southern Section Area Quarter-finals	Wycombe Wanderers	3–6	Bristol Rovers	Adams Park
19:30 BST	Rendell		Kuffour 23', 41', 58', Lines 63', Hughes 71' (pen.), Swallow 90'	Attendance: 1,591; Referee: Keith Hill

30 Nov 2010 Southern Section Area Semi-finals	Bristol Rovers	2–2 (4–5 p)	Exeter City	The Memorial Stadium
19:15 BST	Hoskins 20'; Swallow 78'		Anthony 65' (o.g.); Harley 89'	Attendance: 3,881; Referee: Danny McDermid
	Penalties
	Hoskins (penalty scored); Lines (penalty scored); Coles (penalty scored); Anthony (penalty missed); Richards (penalty scored)		Harley (penalty scored); Jones (penalty scored); Nardiello (penalty scored); Noble (penalty scored); Duffy (penalty scored)

=== FA Cup ===
06 Nov 2010 First round proper	Darlington	2–1	Bristol Rovers	The Darlington Arena
15:00 BST	Brough 15', Smith 57'		Hoskins 17'	Attendance: 1,602

== See also ==
- Bristol Rovers F.C.
- 2010–11 in English football
- 2010–11 Football League One
