= Moses Swaibu =

British entrepreneur and former footballer

- Born: 9 May 1989 (age 37); Islington, England
- Occupations: Entrepreneur, Public speaker, Former professional footballer
- Organization: Game Changer 360
- Known for: Founder of Game Changer 360, Sports integrity advocacy
- Works: Fixed: My Secret Life as a Match Fixer (2025)
- Awards: SJA Best Audio Documentary (2024); True Crime Awards Best Documentary (2024)
Association football career
- Full name: Moses Swaibu
- Date of birth: 9 May 1989 (age 37)
- Place of birth: Islington, England
- Height: 6 ft 2 in (1.88 m)
- Position: Defender
Youth career
- 2005–2007: Crystal Palace
Senior career*
Years	Team	Apps	(Gls)
2007–2008	Crystal Palace	0	(0)
2008	→ Weymouth (loan)	1	(0)
2008	Bromley	15	(0)
2008–2011	Lincoln City	78	(3)
2011	Kettering Town	6	(0)
2011–2013	Bromley	59	(1)
2013	Sutton United	2	(0)
2013	Whitehawk	4	(0)
Total		165	(4)
- * Club domestic league appearances and goals

Moses Swaibu (born 9 May 1989) is an English former professional footballer who played as a defender. During his career, he represented Lincoln City in the Football League, last playing for Whitehawk in 2013. He made a total of 165 league appearances, scoring four goals. In April 2015, he was sentenced to 16 months in prison for his role in a 2013 match fixing scandal.

== Football career ==
=== Crystal Palace ===
Schooled at The Archbishop Lanfranc School, Croydon, Swaibu joined the Crystal Palace academy at the age of 16 having been spotted playing for Croydon Schools and never having been previously associated with a professional club. Impressive progress in the academy saw him offered a professional contract at the culmination of his two-year scholarship, and awarded the Scholar of the Year and Vice-Presidents Young Player of the Year for the 2006–07 season.

Having signed a one-year professional contract with the club, he made the first team squad for the first time for the home game against Watford on 29 October 2007, where he was an unused substitute in a 2–0 defeat; the game though was notable for the Palace debut of the 15-year-old John Bostock.

In February 2008, Swaibu was loaned to Conference National side Weymouth, with Palace manager Neil Warnock hoping that the loan spell would improve his heading ability. Swaibu played a solitary game for Weymouth in the 2–1 defeat at Halifax Town on 1 March 2008 before returning to Selhurst Park. In May 2008, he was one of five players released by the club at the end of their contracts.

=== Lincoln City ===
Swaibu linked up with Bromley at the beginning of September 2008 on non-contract terms, debuting in the 2–2 home draw with Chelmsford City on 2 September 2008, and went on to make 20 league and cup appearances for the Lillywhites, during which he scored a horrific own-goal in the 3–3 draw with Thurrock. In January 2009, he commenced a trial with Lincoln City, and made his Football League debut for the club in the 1–1 draw at Morecambe on 10 February 2009. He scored his first goal for the club on 9 February 2010 during the 2–1 defeat away at Chesterfield, with an audacious chip from 20 yards. He went on to score twice more for the Imps. Having made 10 appearances that season, Swaibu was awarded the Young Player of the Year Award at the end of that season. After the club rejected a transfer bid from Birmingham City and Aston Villa he signed a new two-year deal under Peter Jackson. Moses went on and made over 60 appearances for the Imps in his two-year spell. He left Lincoln in January 2011 by mutual consent.

=== Kettering Town ===
Swaibu signed for Kettering Town on non-contract terms in October 2011. He left the club two months later, after making six appearances.

=== Bromley ===
In December 2011, he rejoined former club Bromley. On 27 April 2012, he signed a new deal with the club, keeping him there until the end of the 2012–13 season. He scored his first goal for the club in a 4–0 away win against Dorchester Town on 8 January 2013. He was not offered a new contract, and left the club at the end of the 2012–13 season.

=== Sutton United and Whitehawk ===
In July 2013 he agreed a three-month deal with Sutton United. He debuted for the club in their 4–1 Conference South victory over Staines Town on 20 August 2013 but made only one further appearance for the club before, at the beginning of September, he was released in order to find regular first team football. He quickly joined Whitehawk but left the club in November having failed to make the expected impact.

== Match-fixing ==
In January 2014, Swaibu was charged with conspiracy to defraud, arising from an investigation into match fixing and an alleged betting syndicate. On 29 April 2015, he was found guilty at Birmingham Crown Court of conspiracy to commit bribery and jailed for sixteen months.

After his release from prison, Swaibu worked with organisations including FIFA and the Premier League, helping them understand match fixing.

== Honours ==
=== Football ===
- Crystal Palace Young Player of the Year: 2006–07
- Lincoln City Young Player of the Year: 2009–10

=== Media and publishing ===
- Sports Journalists' Association (SJA) Award for Best Audio Documentary: 2024
- True Crime Awards – Best Documentary: 2024
- Author of Fixed: My Secret Life as a Match Fixer (2025)

== Philanthropy and community engagement ==
Swaibu's community work focuses on youth mentorship, education, and combating violence, often drawing on his personal experiences to guide young people.

In 2019, Swaibu launched a community initiative aimed at inspiring young people from deprived areas through sport and education. The project was established after his realisation in prison that many inmates "had a lack of education." He stated his goal was to "challenge the status quo and inspire greater aspiration in teenagers from deprived areas," using his knowledge of growing up in South London to steer young people away from violence and crime. He delivered talks at Premier League academies including Manchester United, Arsenal, Tottenham Hotspur, and Crystal Palace.

=== Mentorship ===
Following the George Floyd protests, Swaibu co-authored a proposal for formal mentoring systems for young Black footballers in the UK, arguing that "the time has come to give Black footballers mentors they can believe in."

== Writing and media ==
Swaibu is the author of the book Fixed: My Secret Life as a Match Fixer (2025), published by Penguin Books.

He is also the founder of 30 Decades Ltd, a media and intellectual property company. Under this banner, he was the writer, co-presenter, and associate producer of the BBC podcast Confessions of a Match Fixer. The series was critically acclaimed, with The Guardian's audio critic Miranda Sawyer highlighting it as "the best podcast" in her weekly review, praising its "proper, first-hand testimony" and describing it as "a powerful story of redemption." It won the Sports Journalists' Association Award for Best Audio Documentary in 2024.

His work in explaining the mechanics of match-fixing to a broad audience has been featured in international media, including Business Insider.

The podcast also won Best Documentary at the 2024 True Crime Awards.

=== Critical reception ===
Swaibu's work has been widely cited by sports journalists and integrity bodies:

- "Exposes a dark and corrupt underworld in British football" – Joao Castelo-Branco, ESPN
- "Gritty, dark and inspiring - you won't have read a story like this before" – Daniel Taylor, The Athletic and The New York Times
- "The descent from talented footballer to convicted criminal is shocking. The journey thereafter is nothing short of inspirational" – Rob Dorsett, Sky Sports
- "A compelling and necessary story" – Nicolas Sayde, Council of Europe

=== Publications ===
- 2025: Fixed: My Secret Life as a Match Fixer – In its year-end list for 2025, The Guardian named it one of the "five of the best sports books," calling it "a freewheeling, fascinating read."

== Policy and global impact ==
Swaibu's advocacy extends to contributing to international policy frameworks and security initiatives aimed at combating corruption in sport.

In 2023, his work gained international recognition when he expressed interest in delivering integrity lectures in Brazil, highlighting the global demand for his expertise in sports corruption prevention.

He has been involved with the Bitefix Project, a European Union-funded initiative led by the International Centre for Sport Security (ICSS) to build and support innovative actions against match-fixing and corruption.

Swaibu has also provided analysis on the unique integrity challenges posed by the expansion of legalized sports betting in the United States, arguing that American sports leagues require more sophisticated educational models to prevent corruption.

== Entrepreneurship ==
Swaibu is the founder and CEO of Game Changer 360, an AI-powered integrity-based edtech company focused on transforming sports integrity education through interactive, technology-enabled learning solutions.

He is also the founder of 30 Decades Ltd, a media and intellectual property company. Under this banner, he was the writer, co-presenter, and associate producer of the BBC podcast Confessions of a Match Fixer. The series was critically acclaimed, described by The Guardian as "gripping" and "a powerful story of redemption," and won the Sports Journalists' Association Award for Best Audio Documentary in 2024.

== Business ==
Following his advocacy work, Swaibu transitioned into entrepreneurship, founding companies focused on technology and media.

=== Game Changer 360 ===
In 2023, Swaibu founded Game Changer 360, an AI-powered integrity-based edtech company. The company's mission is to transform sports integrity education by shifting from static compliance training to interactive, technology-enabled learning solutions designed for athletes and stakeholders.

Swaibu has stated that the company develops digital learning platforms optimized for mobile devices, incorporating gamification and real-world scenarios to educate users on corruption, match-fixing risks, and retaliation prevention. He positions the company as a bridge between theoretical integrity principles and the lived reality of manipulation systems, aiming to serve both elite and grassroots levels of sport.
