= Ollie Clarke =

English footballer

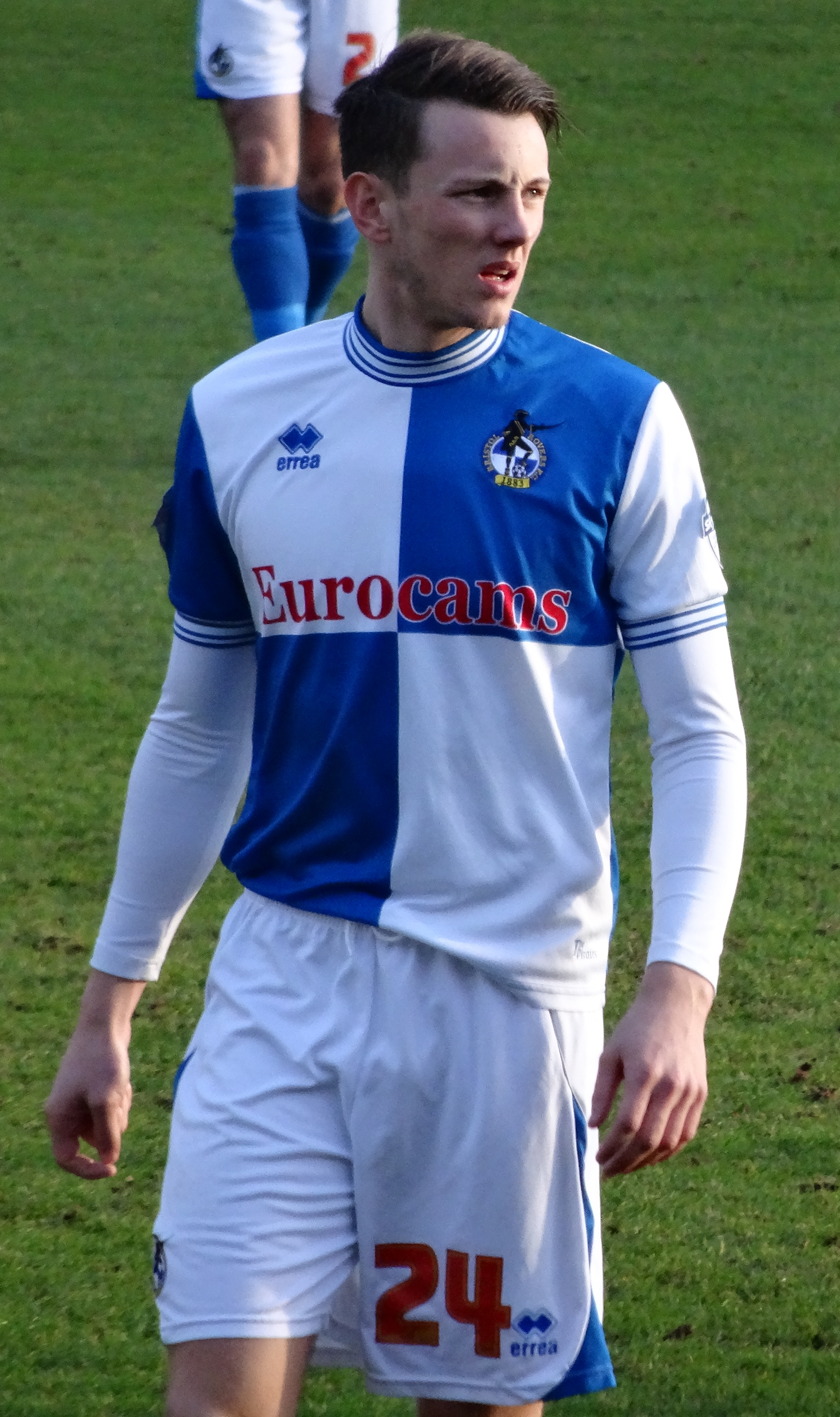
- Clarke playing for Bristol Rovers in 2014

Personal information
- Full name: Oliver Anthony Clarke
- Date of birth: 29 June 1992 (age 34)
- Place of birth: Sea Mills, Bristol, England
- Height: 5 ft 11 in (1.80 m)
- Position: Midfielder

Team information
- Current team: Swindon Town
- Number: 8

Youth career
- –2009: Bristol Rovers

Senior career*
Years	Team	Apps	(Gls)
2009–2020	Bristol Rovers	235	(20)
2010	→ Gloucester City (loan)	3	(0)
2010–2011	→ Mangotsfield United (loan)	15	(3)
2012	→ Clevedon Town (loan)	5	(0)
2020–2024	Mansfield Town	135	(15)
2024–	Swindon Town	55	(10)
- * Club domestic league appearances and goals as of 19:56, 18 March 2026 (UTC)

Oliver Anthony Clarke (born 29 June 1992) is an English professional footballer who plays as a midfielder for EFL League Two club Swindon Town.

== Career ==
=== Bristol Rovers ===
After progressing through the Bristol Rovers youth system, Clarke joined the professional ranks at The Pirates in 2009, alongside fellow youth team graduates Eliot Richards, Neikell Plummer, Dan Cayford, Mark Cooper, George Booth, Steve Kingdon and Jack McKenna. Of this group only Clarke and Richards made any senior appearances.

Clarke failed to make any first team appearances in his first year as a Bristol Rovers player, so early in his second season he was sent out on loan to injury-stricken Gloucester City. He played four games for The Tigers, three in the Conference North and one in the second qualifying round of the FA Cup. Shortly afterwards he was loaned to Southern League side Mangotsfield United, who he joined on Christmas Eve 2010 initially for a month. He remained there for the maximum 3-month period permitted by Southern League rules after the spell was extended and he made a total of 15 appearances, all in the league, and scored three times.

He eventually made his debut for Bristol Rovers in their final game of the 2010–11 season, when he came on as an 88th-minute substitute for Harry Pell against Colchester United at the Colchester Community Stadium. His hopes of continuing to play first team football after the 2011 summer break were dashed however when he suffered a rupture to his anterior cruciate ligament on his first day back in training, leaving him unable to play for several months while he recovered from reconstructive surgery. His first goal for Rovers came against Portsmouth on 21 December 2013, it was well taken from the edge of the box to score the first in a 2–0 win

On 18 March 2014, Clarke signed a new two-year contract extension with the Pirates. He played 1 season with Rovers in the Conference, whilst achieving promotion via the playoffs. He scored 4 goals in this successful season.

The following season, Clarke scored two goals for Rovers including a wonder goal against Newport County His defensive and attacking efforts helped his team achieve promotion to Football League One after finishing in 3rd place. In the following summer, he signed a new deal with the club as he stated that he is "really looking forward to the challenges ahead this season".

The 2016–17 season proved to be successful for Clarke. He was rewarded for his fine performances when on 8 March 2017 he signed a new contract. During the same month he hit a purple patch scoring 2 goals in 3 games in a vital 2–0 victory away to Oxford United and a 2–1 victory at home to Chesterfield during which he scored just 30 seconds into the match.

After captaining the club during the 2019–20 season, Clarke turned down a new contract with the club where he made over 250 appearances.

=== Mansfield Town ===
On 1 July 2020, Clarke signed a two-year contract with League Two side Mansfield Town. Having been given the captaincy at his previous club by manager Graham Coughlan, Coughlan again gave Clarke the captaincy for the 2020–21 season.

Clarke was an unused substitute as Mansfield were defeated 3–0 by Port Vale in the 2022 League Two play-off final. The club exercised the option to extend his contract at the end of the 2021–22 season. In September 2022, Clarke's early season form was rewarded with a new contract that would keep him at the club until June 2024.

=== Swindon Town ===
On 31 May 2024, Clarke signed for League Two club Swindon Town for an undisclosed fee. He later revealed his desire to make the move happen having learned Mansfield were going to trigger his contract extension, instead wanting to move closer to home. Ahead of the commencement of the 2024–25 season, Clarke was named club captain.

In December 2025, Clarke was suspended for seven matches and fined £2,750 for inappropriate behaviour in a 2–1 EFL Cup loss to Cardiff City on 12 August 2025. According to the report of a disciplinary hearing, Clarke committed “highly violating and intentional foul play” on two opponents’ “private body parts”.

On 29 January 2026, Clarke received a further one match ban (along with Swindon Town receiving a warning and a £1,000 fine) due to him being ineligibly fielded in their victory against Luton Town in the Vertu Trophy, as he was still serving his original seven-match ban.

On 11 May 2026, the club announced he had signed a new one-year contract.

== Career statistics ==
As of match played 7 August 2025

Appearances and goals by club, season and competition
Club	Season	League			FA Cup		League Cup		Other		Total	
Club	Season	Division	Apps	Goals	Apps	Goals	Apps	Goals	Apps	Goals	Apps	Goals
Bristol Rovers	2010–11	League One	1	0	0	0	0	0	0	0	1	0
Bristol Rovers	2011–12	League Two	0	0	0	0	0	0	0	0	-	0
Bristol Rovers	2012–13	League Two	5	0	0	0	1	0	0	0	6	0
Bristol Rovers	2013–14	League Two	32	2	5	0	0	0	0	0	37	2
Bristol Rovers	2014–15	Conference Premier	27	4	1	0	—		3 (Note: One appearance in FA Trophy, two appearances in Conference Premier play-offs)	0	31	4
Bristol Rovers	2015–16	League Two	33	2	0	0	1	0	1 (Note: Appearances in Football League Trophy)	0	35	2
Bristol Rovers	2016–17	League One	30	4	2	0	2	0	2 (Note: Appearances in EFL Trophy)	0	36	4
Bristol Rovers	2017–18	League One	40	1	1	0	1	0	2	0	44	1
Bristol Rovers	2018–19	League One	40	6	2	0	2	1	3	1	47	8
Bristol Rovers	2019–20	League One	27	1	3	0	2	0	2	0	34	1
Bristol Rovers	Total		235	20	14	0	9	1	13	1	271	22
Gloucester City (loan)	2010–11	Conference North	3	0	1	0	—		0	0	4	0
Mangotsfield United (loan)	2010–11	SL Division One South & West	15	3	—		—		0	0	15	3
Clevedon Town (loan)	2011–12	SL Division One South & West	5	0	0	0	—		4 (Note: Two appearances in Southern Football League Cup, two appearances and one goal in Somerset Premier Cup)	1	9	1
Mansfield Town	2020–21	League Two	33	3	1	0	0	0	2	0	36	3
Mansfield Town	2021–22	League Two	26	4	3	0	1	0	1 (Note: Appearance(s) in EFL League Two play-offs)	0	31	4
Mansfield Town	2022–23	League Two	37	5	1	0	1	0	2	0	41	5
Mansfield Town	2023–24	League Two	39	3	1	0	4	0	0	0	44	3
Mansfield Town	Total		135	15	6	0	6	0	5	0	152	15
Swindon Town	2024–25	League Two	30	4	1	0	1	0	1	0	33	4
Swindon Town	2025–26	League Two	1	0	0	0	0	0	0	0	1	0
Swindon Town	Total		31	4	1	0	1	0	1	0	34	4
Career total			424	42	22	0	16	1	23	2	485	45

== Honours ==
Bristol Rovers

- Football Conference play-offs: 2015
- Football League Two third-place promotion: 2015–16

Mansfield Town

- EFL League Two third-place promotion: 2023–24

Individual

- Bristol Rovers Player of the Year: 2016–17, 2018–19
