= 2013 English football match-fixing scandal =

In November and December 2013 several individuals were arrested by the National Crime Agency (NCA) on suspicion of fixing English association football matches. The arrests occurred as a result of two separate newspaper investigations, by The Daily Telegraph and the Sun on Sunday. On 17 June 2014, a jury at Birmingham Crown Court found Michael Boateng, Krishna Sanjey Ganeshan and Chann Sankaran guilty of conspiracy to commit bribery, while Hakeem Adelakun was cleared of the offence. Sankaran and Ganeshan were sentenced to five years in prison, with Boeteng given an 18-month sentence. At a later trial, Moses Swaibu and Delroy Facey were also found guilty of conspiracy to commit bribery and sentenced to 16 months and 30 months in prison respectively.

== Sun on Sunday investigation ==
Six people were arrested by the NCA in December 2013 as the result of an investigation into match fixing by the Sun on Sunday. Sam Sodje, a former player for Reading and Portsmouth, allegedly claimed that he could arrange for footballers in the Football League Championship to get themselves booked in exchange for cash payments. One of the six people arrested was footballer DJ Campbell.

Sodje told reporters that in an attempt to receive a red card and £70,000 he had twice punched the Oldham Athletic player Jose Baxter, while playing for Portsmouth in a League One match. Sodje also claimed that he was preparing to fix games at the 2014 FIFA World Cup and that he had organised £30,000 to be paid to a Championship player for receiving a yellow card. Sodje additionally claimed that he could fix Premier League games.

The investigation also surrounded claims by Sodje involving his brother, the Tranmere Rovers player Akpo Sodje, and the Oldham player Cristian Montaño.

== Daily Telegraph investigation ==
The NCA said their operation was focused on a "suspected international illegal betting syndicate", and said they were closely cooperating with the Gambling Commission and the Football Association. A seventh person was later arrested, and two of the initial six people arrested, Chann Sankaran, and Krishna Sanjey Ganeshan, were charged with conspiracy to defraud. Sankaran is a Singaporean national, and Ganeshan a dual UK-Singaporean national.

The six men who were arrested included three football players and football agent Delroy Facey, a former Premier League player. Two of the footballers were charged with conspiracy to defraud. The players charged, Michael Boateng and Hakeem Adelakun, both played for non-league Whitehawk at the time of the offence.

In a series of undercover meetings in Manchester, a Singaporean fixer claimed that he could rig the result of football games and that potential gamblers using betting websites based in Asia would make hundreds of thousands of pounds as a result of the information. The fixer claimed to "control" teams in other European countries and claimed to "buy" foreign referees to influence results.

The cost of fixing matches in England was "very high" according to the fixer, who said the cost for players was usually £70,000. The fixer planned to target two football matches in Britain in November, and tell the players how many total goals needed to be scored. The fixer gave an example of a game where four goals needed to be scored, with two goals would be scored in each half. The result was irrelevant as long as the correct number of total goals was scored. The fixer claimed that a player would be paid £5,000 to receive a yellow card at the start of the game as a signal to him that the match result could be manipulated. The fixer accurately predicted how many goals would be scored in a football match during the following day. The fixer asked The Daily Telegraph for €60,000 so that players could be paid. The fixer claimed to be connected to the convicted match fixer Wilson Raj Perumal, a fellow Singaporean, describing Perumal as "the king". Perumal is assisting police in Hungary in their own investigations of corruption.

== NCA investigation & jail terms ==
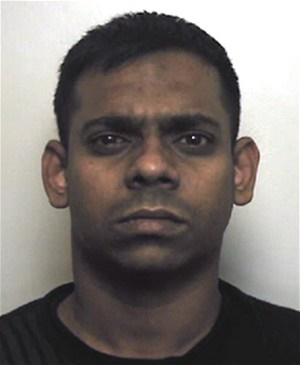
Chann Sankaran mugshot for 2013 English match fixing scandal

Following newspaper reports, an investigation was launched by the National Crime Agency. Subsequently the two businessmen, Krishna Ganeshan, and Chann Sankaran, were jailed along with footballer Michael Boateng who were all convicted of conspiracy to commit bribery for a failed plot to fix a game between AFC Wimbledon and Dagenham & Redbridge on 26 November. The National Crime Agency believed that the case may be part of wider Singaporean match-fixing syndicate which Europol and other investigations have uncovered.

== Reaction ==
The Secretary of State for Culture, Media and Sport, Maria Miller, said that criminal activity had "no place" in British sport, and said that the actions of the NCA showed that "robust" measures existed to tackle unlawful activities.

The shadow minister for sport, Clive Efford, said that the government had failed to do enough to help the governing bodies of sports address the issue of match fixing. Efford said that the government had voted against his amendments to the Gambling Bill that would have "fixed the anomaly that exempts sports spread-betting operators from the requirement to pass on details of suspicious betting activity to sports governing bodies."
