= Chris Lines =

English footballer (born 1985)

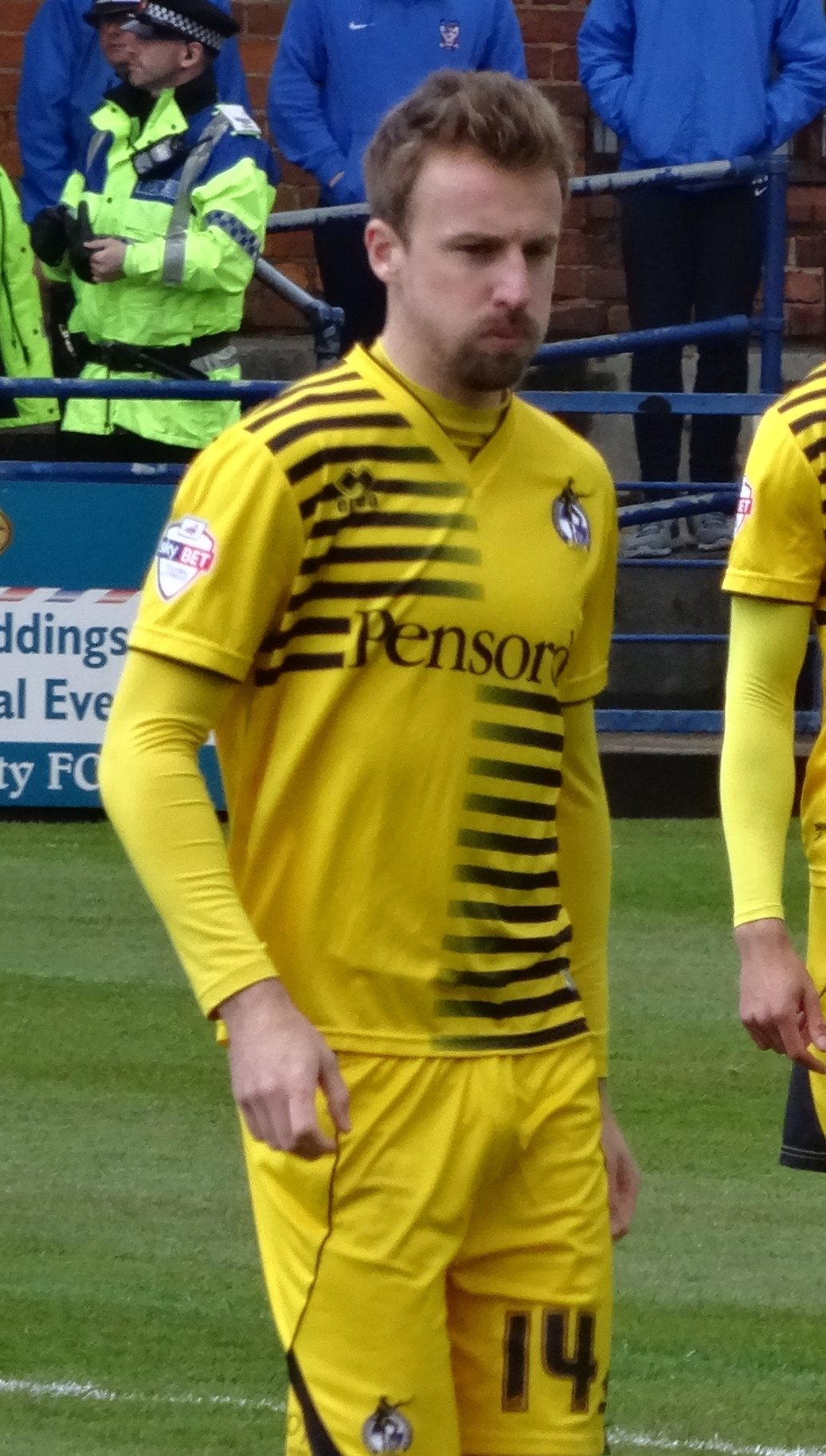
- Lines playing for Bristol Rovers in 2016

Personal information
- Full name: Christopher John Lines
- Date of birth: 30 November 1985 (age 40)
- Place of birth: Bristol, England
- Height: 6 ft 2 in (1.88 m)
- Position: Midfielder

Team information
- Current team: Roman Glass St George (player-manager)

Youth career
- 2001–2002: Bitton
- 2002–2004: Bristol Rovers

Senior career*
Years	Team	Apps	(Gls)
2004–2011	Bristol Rovers	168	(21)
2011–2013	Sheffield Wednesday	47	(3)
2013	→ Milton Keynes Dons (loan)	16	(0)
2013–2015	Port Vale	61	(3)
2015	→ Bristol Rovers (loan)	8	(1)
2015–2019	Bristol Rovers	138	(9)
2019–2021	Northampton Town	35	(3)
2021–2022	Stevenage	51	(3)
2022–2024	Bath City	44	(0)
2024	→ Yate Town (loan)	6	(0)
2024–2025	Roman Glass St George	35	(6)
2025–2026	Corsham Town	26	(1)
2026–	Roman Glass St George	6	(2)

Managerial career
- 2025–2026: Corsham Town (player-manager)
- 2026–: Roman Glass St George (player-manager)
- * Club domestic league appearances and goals as of 21:22, 28 April 2026 (UTC)

Christopher John Lines (born 30 November 1985) is an English former professional football player and manager who is the player-manager at Hellenic League Premier Division club Roman Glass St George.

Lines, a midfielder, turned professional at Bristol Rovers and made his first-team debut in January 2006. He played in the 2007 Football League Trophy final defeat. He was an unused substitute in the League Two play-off final victory before becoming a first team regular from the 2007–08 season. He was sold to Sheffield Wednesday for £50,000 in August 2011 and was a key first-team player as the "Owls" won promotion to the Championship at the end of the 2011–12 campaign. However, he lost his first-team place the following season and was loaned out to Milton Keynes Dons in January 2013.

He signed with Port Vale in July 2013. A key first-team player in the 2013–14 season, he lost his first-team place. He returned to Bristol Rovers on loan in March 2015, helping Rovers to win promotion out of the Conference Premier via the play-offs before rejoining Rovers permanently in the summer. He helped Rovers to achieve a second successive promotion in the 2015–16 campaign and left the club in May 2019 for the second time; then he joined Northampton Town. He helped Northampton to win promotion out of League Two via the play-offs in 2020 and then moved on to Stevenage for an 18-month stay in January 2021. He dropped into non-League football to play for Bath City in June 2022 and left the club in 2024 following a spell on loan at Yate Town. He joined Roman Glass St George in July 2024 and moved on to Corsham Town 11 months later. He became player-manager at Corsham in October 2025, though was sacked the following March. He returned to Roman Glass St George as player-manager in May 2026.

== Career ==
=== Bristol Rovers ===
Born in Bristol, Lines spent a year playing for Bitton as a 16-year-old, before graduating through the Bristol Rovers-backed Bristol Academy of Sport at South Gloucestershire and Stroud College. He had previously been released from the Bristol Rovers youth programme, but was re-signed at the age of 16. He made his first-team debut for Rovers on 21 January 2006, playing the last five minutes of a 2–1 win over Chester City at the Memorial Stadium. After two further substitute appearances in League Two, he made his first league start on 6 May, in a 3–2 home defeat to Macclesfield Town.

After three appearances in the 2006–07 campaign, he featured in six matches from March onwards, and was an extra time substitute for Lewis Haldane in the Football League Trophy final defeat to Doncaster Rovers at the Millennium Stadium. He was an unused substitute in the League Two play-off final, as Rovers won promotion with a 3–1 victory over Shrewsbury Town at Wembley.

He became a first-team regular under manager Paul Trollope in the 2007–08 season, playing 27 League One games and featuring in eight of the "Gasheads" nine FA Cup games en route to the quarter-finals. BBC reporter Nathan Mercer credited Lines with an "excellent" performance as Rovers beat Premier League side Fulham on penalties in the third round on 22 January. Lines was fouled by Dejan Stefanović in an incident which saw the Serbian sent off. He scored his first goal in competitive football on 29 December, opening the scoring in a 3–0 home win over Carlisle United with a header. He played 48 games in the 2008–09 season, and missed only one league game due a suspension he picked up whilst celebrating an injury-time equaliser he scored against Swindon Town on 22 November.

Lines was nominated for the League One Player of the Month award in November 2009 after scoring a goal in each of his three league games that month. He signed a new three-and-a-half-year contract with Rovers in January 2010. He was described by director of football Lennie Lawrence as "a fundamental part of our plans to take this club forward." This came shortly after he was reported to be a transfer target for Southampton manager Alan Pardew. The transfer rumours continued despite the new contract. In total he scored ten goals in 46 appearances in the 2009–10 campaign.

He was ruled out for two weeks with a toe injury in February 2011 but thanked manager Dave Penney after he immediately returned to the first team. Despite this praise he publicly supported the board's decision to sack Penney the following month, and went on to praise the impact of caretaker manager Stuart Campbell. Following Rovers' relegation to League Two at the end of the 2010–11 season, Lines spent seven days on trial at Championship side Crystal Palace. New Rovers boss Paul Buckle admitted that he was unlikely to keep Lines for the following season. He was still at the club though for the 2011–12 season opening victory over AFC Wimbledon at Kingsmeadow.

=== Sheffield Wednesday ===
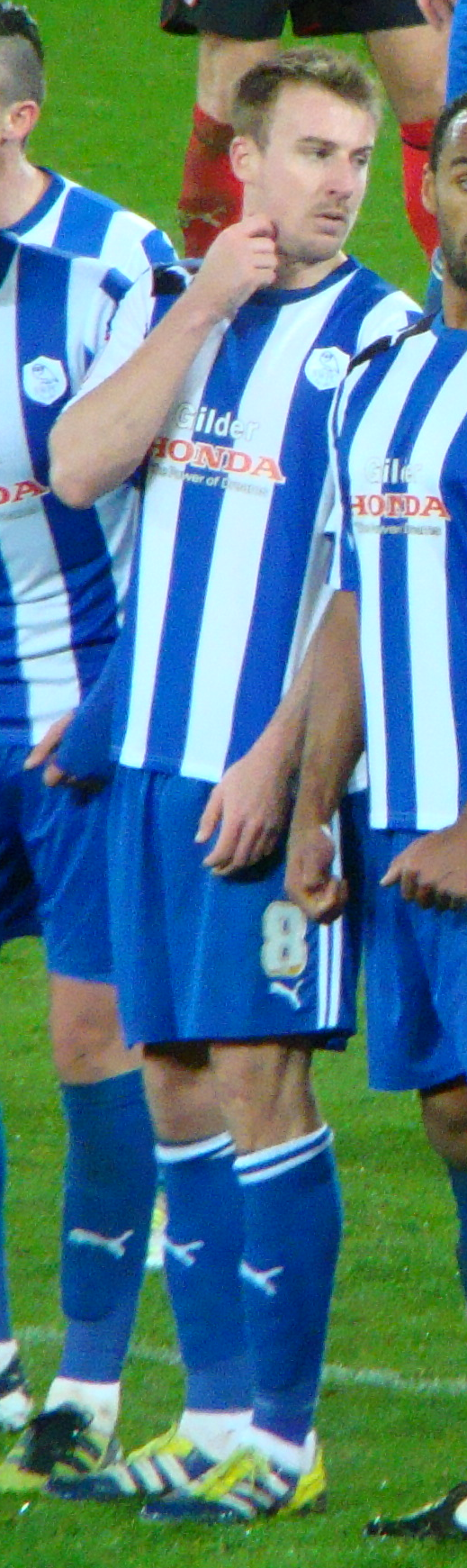
Lines playing for Sheffield Wednesday in 2012

In August 2011, Lines joined League One club Sheffield Wednesday on a three-year contract for a £50,000 fee. He went on to score four goals in 47 appearances in the 2011–12 campaign as Wednesday secured promotion with a second-place finish and was twice named on the League One Team of the Week. He made 12 assists in the campaign, just two fewer than divisional assist leader Stephen Quinn.

"It's all new to me, I had one promotion before but this was amazing, Saturday was amazing, to have that kind of crowd in League One is unreal. There were some mad scenes at the end but it was a great day. I'm proud to be at this club."

— Lines reflecting on the promotion success in May 2012.

He picked up a groin injury at the start of the 2012–13 season. He was out of action for three months. Manager Dave Jones played Lines in six Championship games in the buildup to Christmas, though did not play him in the new year. On 22 January 2013, Lines joined League One Milton Keynes Dons on loan for the remainder of the season after manager Karl Robinson admitted that Lines was "a player I have admired for a number of years now". Robinson was in search of midfield options after Luke Chadwick and Stephen Gleeson both picked up injuries. He featured in 18 games for the MK Dons, including the 4–2 victory over Premier League side Queens Park Rangers at Loftus Road in the fourth round of the FA Cup. After returning from Stadium mk, Lines had his contract at Hillsborough cancelled by mutual consent in July 2013.

=== Port Vale ===
Lines signed a one-year contract with newly promoted League One side Port Vale in July 2013. In the first part of the 2013–14 season he began tracking back to help his defence whilst also being the key playmaker in central midfield, after a discussion with manager Micky Adams. He scored his first goal for the "Valiants" with a "superb free-kick" from 25 yards (23 m) in a 1–0 win over Tranmere Rovers at Prenton Park on 29 September. He went on to build a partnership in midfield with Anthony Griffith, who provided tough-tackling skills whilst Lines played as a creative playmaker. He signed a new two-year contract in June 2014. He said that the good team spirit at the club was a major factor in him signing the contract.

He remained a key first-team player in the first half of the 2014–15 season, being named on the Football League Team of the Week after he "pulled the strings" in a 4–1 win over Yeovil Town at Vale Park. However, he was sent off for violent conduct after thrusting his head towards Dele Alli in a 1–0 defeat to Milton Keynes Dons at Stadium mk on 22 November; manager Rob Page stated that he was disappointed in Lines. After returning from suspension he lost his midfield spot to Michael O'Connor and Michael Brown.

=== Return to Bristol Rovers ===
On 9 March 2015, he rejoined his first professional club, Bristol Rovers, on loan until the end of the 2014–15 season. They ended the Conference Premier campaign in second place, but Lines scored a goal in a 3–0 aggregate victory over Forest Green Rovers in the play-off semi-finals to help Rovers to reach the play-off final at Wembley Stadium. He played in the 1–1 draw with Grimsby Town in the play-off final and converted the first penalty of the shoot-out, which Rovers won to regain their place in the English Football League. He was signed by Rovers manager Darrell Clarke on a permanent basis in June 2015, after his contract with Port Vale was cancelled by mutual consent. Lines made 36 appearances as Rovers won promotion with a third-place finish in 2015–16 and he would sign a new contract in June 2016.

Lines scored his first goal since his full return to Bristol Rovers with a strike from 25 yards (23 m) in a 1–0 victory over Cardiff City in the first round of the EFL Cup on 11 August 2016. The goal secured Rovers a trip to Stamford Bridge and a second round tie against Chelsea, which they ultimately lost 3–2. He scored his first league goal since his return in a late 2–1 comeback victory over Gillingham on 15 October as he embarked on a run from deep before calmly tucking the ball beyond opposition goalkeeper Jonathan Bond. His consistently good performances were rewarded with a new undisclosed-length contract in March 2017.

Speaking as the oldest member of the squad at the age of 32 in September 2017, he admitted to becoming a vegetarian as he restricted his diet in an attempt to extend his playing career. On 2 April 2018, he was sent off during a 2–0 defeat at Fleetwood Town and was subsequently abused by some of the club's supporters on social media. He ended the 2017–18 season with five goals in 47 appearances as Rovers posted a 13th-place finish in League One. On 21 August 2018, he scored a 76th-minute penalty in a 2–1 home defeat to Portsmouth, only to get sent off two minutes later for a studs up challenge on Brett Pitman. However, he lost his first-team place after Graham Coughlan replaced Clarke as manager in December; the player and new manager would have a strained relationship, which led Lines to call Coughlan "embarrassing".

On 8 May 2019, Lines was announced to be one of nine players leaving the club at the end of their contract. Lines ended his second spell with his boyhood club having made over 350 appearances and having achieved three promotions during his two spells at the club.

=== Northampton Town ===
On 15 May 2019, Lines signed a two-year deal with League Two side Northampton Town; manager Keith Curle said that "I think his attributes will really help us". Darrell Clarke had tried to tempt him to join him at Walsall, but was unsuccessful. He quickly established himself as a key first-team player under Curle, starting nine of Northampton's first ten league games of the 2019–20 season. On 18 January, he scored a volleyed finish in a 4–1 victory over Morecambe, which was later voted as goal of the season (so far) by readers of the Northampton Chronicle & Echo during the COVID-19 pandemic in England. The season was curtailed and Northampton went on to qualify for the play-offs, though Lines was an unused substitute in the behind closed doors Wembley final as Northampton recorded a 4–0 victory over Exeter City to secure promotion into League One, the fifth promotion of Lines' career. However, he featured in just four League One and six cup games in the first half of the 2020–21 campaign and decided to leave Sixfields in search of regular game-time elsewhere.

=== Stevenage ===
Lines joined League Two club Stevenage on a six-month contract on 5 January 2021. He played 21 games in the second half of the 2020–21 season, helping Stevenage finish in 14th-place, and signed a new contract with the club. Lines opened his account in the second match of the 2021–22 season, opening the scoring in the 88th minute of an eventual 2–0 win over Lines' two-time former and boyhood club Bristol Rovers. Despite this however, Lines gave a lap of the pitch after the match, receiving applause from both sets of fans having walked out onto the pitch with his daughters before the match. Manager Alex Revell said that it was "a great goal from Chris, he deserves it. He was a key part of us last year". Lines was one of 15 players to be released by new manager Steve Evans at the end of the 2021–22 season, having made 36 appearances as Stevenage posted a 21st-place finish.

=== Non-League ===
On 19 June 2022, Lines agreed to join National League South club Bath City upon the expiration of his contract with Stevenage. This transfer saw Lines return to Twerton Park, as he had watched Bristol Rovers matches there as a child. He made 38 appearances in the 2022–23 season, whilst also working in insurance.

In March 2024, Lines joined Southern League Division One South club Yate Town on loan until the end of the 2023–24 season. He played six games and then returned to Bath City, where he was released upon the expiry of his contract.

In July 2024, he joined Hellenic Premier Division club Roman Glass St George, making his debut and scoring the first goal in a 6–1 opening day win over Cirencester Town. He made 35 league appearances for the club during the 2024-25 season, scoring six goals.

On 2 June 2025, Lines joined Hellenic Premier Division side Corsham Town. On 1 October 2025, following a short spell as interim player-manager, Lines was appointed first-team player-manager. He was sacked in March 2026, much to his surprise.

Following his sacking from Corsham Town, he returned to Roman Glass St George, before being appointed player-manager on 29 May 2026.

== Style of play ==
Lines has strong technical passing attributes and vision. He has been described by the Sheffield Star's Paul Thompson as being a "cultured, creative, passing midfielder who gets on the ball and likes to dictate play... he's also very mobile and has decent vision". Port Vale manager Micky Adams described him as a "tall, strong central midfielder". He was described as a set piece specialist by The Sentinel correspondent Dave Johnson.

== Personal life ==
Lines likes hip-hop and rap music and tends to be in charge of the playlist in club dressing rooms. He worked in insurance after leaving full-time professional football.

== Career statistics ==
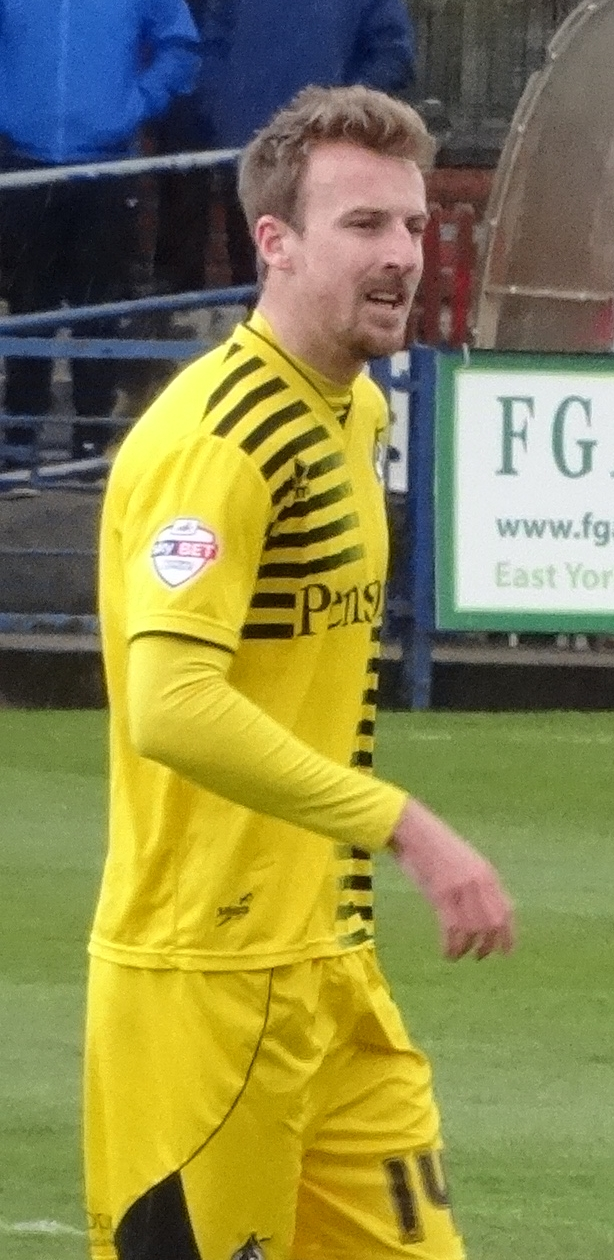
Lines playing for Bristol Rovers in 2016

As of match played 10 April 2024

Appearances and goals by club, season and competition
Club	Season	League			FA Cup		League Cup		Other		Total	
Club	Season	Division	Apps	Goals	Apps	Goals	Apps	Goals	Apps	Goals	Apps	Goals
Bristol Rovers	2004–05	League Two	0	0	0	0	0	0	0	0	0	0
Bristol Rovers	2005–06	League Two	4	0	0	0	0	0	0	0	4	0
Bristol Rovers	2006–07	League Two	7	0	0	0	0	0	2 (Note: One appearance in Football League Trophy, one in League Two play-offs)	0	9	0
Bristol Rovers	2007–08	League One	27	3	8	0	0	0	1 (Note: Appearance(s) in Football League Trophy)	0	36	3
Bristol Rovers	2008–09	League One	45	4	1	0	1	0	1	0	48	4
Bristol Rovers	2009–10	League One	42	11	1	0	2	0	1	0	46	11
Bristol Rovers	2010–11	League One	42	3	1	0	1	1	2	1	46	5
Bristol Rovers	2011–12	League Two	1	0	—		—		—		1	0
Sheffield Wednesday	2011–12	League One	41	3	5	1	1	0	0	0	47	4
Sheffield Wednesday	2012–13	Championship	6	0	0	0	0	0	—		6	0
Sheffield Wednesday	Sheffield Wednesday total		47	3	5	1	1	0	0	0	53	4
Milton Keynes Dons (loan)	2012–13	League One	16	0	2	0	—		—		18	0
Port Vale	2013–14	League One	34	1	4	1	1	0	1	0	40	2
Port Vale	2014–15	League One	27	2	1	0	2	0	1	0	31	2
Port Vale	Port Vale total		61	3	5	1	3	0	2	0	71	4
Bristol Rovers (loan)	2014–15	Conference Premier	8	0	—		—		3 (Note: Appearances in Conference Premier play-offs)	1	11	1
Bristol Rovers	2015–16	League Two	33	0	1	0	0	0	2	0	36	0
Bristol Rovers	2016–17	League One	44	3	2	0	2	1	1 (Note: Appearance(s) in EFL Trophy)	0	49	4
Bristol Rovers	2017–18	League One	42	5	1	0	3	0	1	0	47	5
Bristol Rovers	2018–19	League One	19	1	1	1	1	0	3	0	24	2
Bristol Rovers	Bristol Rovers total		314	30	16	1	10	2	17	1	357	35
Northampton Town	2019–20	League Two	31	2	5	0	1	0	2	0	39	2
Northampton Town	2020–21	League One	4	1	0	0	2	0	4	0	10	1
Northampton Town	Northampton Town total		35	3	5	0	3	0	6	0	49	3
Stevenage	2020–21	League Two	20	0	1	0	—		—		21	0
Stevenage	2021–22	League Two	31	3	2	0	1	0	3	0	37	3
Stevenage	Stevenage total		51	3	3	0	1	0	3	0	58	3
Bath City	2022–23	National League South	36	0	3	0	—		6 (Note: Two appearances in FA Trophy, four appearances in Somerset Premier Cup)	0	45	0
Bath City	2023–24	National League South	8	0	0	0	—		3 (Note: One appearance in FA Trophy, two appearances in Somerset Premier Cup)	0	11	0
Bath City	Bath City total		44	0	3	0	0	0	9	0	56	0
Yate Town (loan)	2023–24	Southern League; Division One South	6	0	0	0	—		0	0	6	0
Roman Glass St George	2024–25	Hellenic League; Premier Division	35	6	0	0	—		9	4	44	10
Corsham Town	2025–26	Hellenic League; Premier Division	26	1	0	0	—		1	0	27	1
Roman Glass St George	2025–26	Hellenic League; Premier Division	6	2	0	0	—		0	0	6	2
Roman Glass St George	2026–27	Hellenic League; Premier Division	0	0	0	0	—		0	0	0	0
Roman Glass St George	Total		6	2	0	0	0	0	0	0	6	2
Career total			641	51	39	3	18	2	45	6	743	62

== Honours ==
Bristol Rovers

- Football League Two play-offs: 2007
- Conference Premier play-offs: 2015
- Football League Two third-place promotion: 2015–16
- Football League Trophy runner-up: 2006–07

Sheffield Wednesday

- Football League One second-place promotion: 2011–12

Northampton Town

- EFL League Two play-offs: 2020
