= Ben Swallow =

Welsh footballer

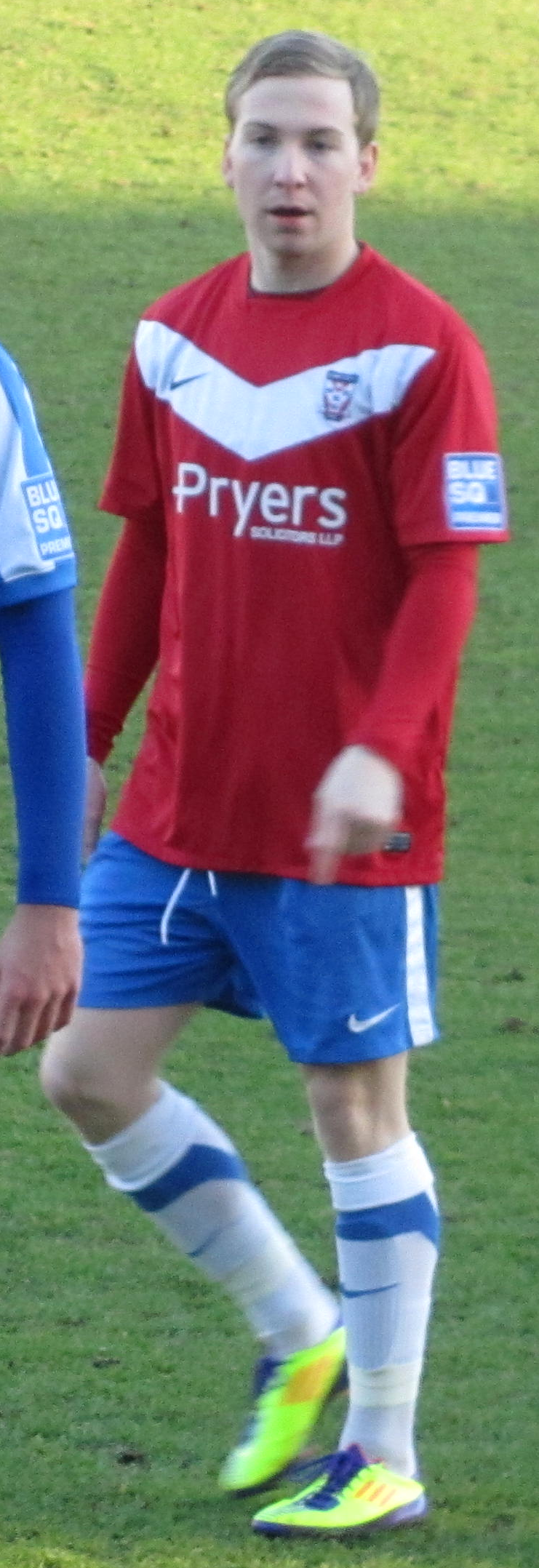
- Swallow playing for York City in 2012

Personal information
- Full name: Benjamin Owen Swallow
- Date of birth: 20 October 1989 (age 37)
- Place of birth: Barry, Wales
- Height: 5 ft 8 in (1.73 m)
- Position: Winger

Youth career
- 1999–2006: Cardiff City
- 2006–2008: Bristol Rovers

Senior career*
Years	Team	Apps	(Gls)
2008–2012	Bristol Rovers	40	(0)
2008	→ Taunton Town (loan)	3	(0)
2008	→ Bridgwater Town (loan)		
2009	→ Chippenham Town (loan)		
2009	→ Mangotsfield United (loan)		
2011	→ Bath City (loan)	9	(0)
2012	York City	2	(0)
2012–2013	Newport County	20	(2)
2013–2014	Bromley	10	(1)
2014	Dartford	11	(0)
2014–2017	Havant & Waterlooville	73	(6)
2017	→ Margate (loan)	3	(0)
2017–2018	Bognor Regis Town	40	(0)
2018–2019	Weston-super-Mare	20	(0)
2019	→ Merthyr Town (loan)	14	(0)
2019–2020	Merthyr Town	22	(0)
2020–2021	Redditch United	2	(0)
2021–2022	Merthyr Town	0	(0)

International career
2012	Wales Semi-Pro	1	(0)
- * Club domestic league appearances and goals as of 09:00, 19 November 2020 (UTC)

Benjamin Owen Swallow (born 20 October 1989) is a Welsh footballer who plays as a winger.

== Early life ==
Born in Barry, Vale of Glamorgan, Swallow attended Eglwys Newydd Primary School in Whitchurch, Cardiff from 1994 to 2001.

== Club career ==
=== Cardiff City and Bristol Rovers ===
Swallow played schoolboy football for Cardiff City for seven years before being released and went on to spend two years with South Gloucestershire and Stroud College, playing for the College side and Bristol Rovers' under-18 team. After finishing at South Gloucestershire and Stroud College he signed his first professional contract with Rovers during the summer of 2008, ahead of the start of the 2008–09 season. He joined Southern Football League Division One South & West side Taunton Town on loan in September 2008, making his debut in a 4–0 defeat away at Gosport Borough. Swallow made five appearances for Taunton in all competitions before signing for Bridgwater Town of the Southern Football League Division One South & West on a one-month loan in November. He started a one-month loan with Southern Football League Premier Division side Chippenham Town on 20 February 2009. Swallow started his fourth and final loan of the season after joining Southern Football League Premier Division side Mangotsfield United in April.

Swallow had earned much praise for his pre-season performances in 2009, and his senior debut came on 11 August, when he played in a League Cup first round tie against Aldershot Town, coming on as a 73rd minute substitute for Sean Rigg.

On 9 November 2010, Swallow scored his first senior goal for the club in a 6–3 win over Wycombe Wanderers in the Football League Trophy. He scored his second goal for Rovers in the next round of the Football League Trophy against Exeter City.

On 31 August 2011, Swallow joined Conference Premier side Bath City on a three-month loan. After making nine appearances for Bath he was recalled by Rovers on 16 November because of injury problems in the team.

On 4 December, Swallow came on as a second-half substitute against AFC Totton in the FA Cup second round. Rovers were 4–1 up, and Swallow was sent off for a reckless challenge after just six minutes, which drew criticism from manager Paul Buckle, although Rovers went on to win 6–1. Later that month he was told he could leave the club on a free transfer. Conference Premier side York City made a failed attempt to sign Swallow during January 2012, before he was released by Rovers after his contract was cancelled by mutual consent on 31 January.

=== York City ===
Swallow eventually signed for York on a contract until the end of the 2011–12 season on 2 February 2012. He made his debut in York's 1–0 victory at home to Ebbsfleet United in the FA Trophy third round on 14 February. Swallow was released by York on 13 April 2012 because of an internal issue reported as his lack of punctuality at training sessions.

=== Newport County ===
On 10 August 2012, Swallow signed for Conference Premier club Newport County on an initial one-month contract which was subsequently extended. He was part of the Newport team that reached the Conference Premier play-offs in the 2012–13 season, in which he made 23 appearances and scored 2 goals. Swallow was not part of the matchday squad as Newport won the 2013 Conference Premier play-off final versus Wrexham at Wembley Stadium 2–0 to return to the Football League after a 25-year absence with promotion to League Two. He was released by Newport on 11 May 2013.

=== Bromley ===
He joined Conference South team Bromley on 10 September 2013 following a successful trial. He made his debut as a second-half substitute in a 3–0 win over Staines Town on 14 September 2013. Following further substitute appearances in victories against Concord Rangers and Basingstoke Town, his first start for the club came in the FA Cup Second qualifying round against Burgess Hill Town on 28 September 2013. Bromley went on to win the match 1–0, with Swallow providing the assist for the goal, scored by Shamir Mullings. He scored his first goal for Bromley on 5 October 2013, in a 1–1 away draw with Boreham Wood. He left the club on 13 January 2014, having made 15 appearances in all competitions and scoring one goal.

=== Dartford ===
On 20 January 2014, Swallow signed for Dartford, and was given the number 19 shirt. He made his debut in a 5–1 win over Woking on 18 February, coming on as an 86th-minute substitute. In May 2014, Swallow was released by Dartford after spending six months with the club, making eleven appearances.

=== Havant & Waterlooville ===
In July 2014 trailed with Havant & Waterlooville F.C. and played 45 minutes on 10 July against Horndean FC. He was than after successful trial signed on 11 July 2014 by the Hawks.

=== Redditch United ===
Swallow signed for Southern League Premier Division Central side Redditch United on 4 October 2020.

== International career ==
Swallow was called up to the Wales semi-professional squad for the match versus Turkey in October 2012 and made his debut in the starting line-up.

== Style of play ==
Swallow plays primarily as a left winger and can also operate at left back. He has been praised for his crossing ability, his ability to hold the ball up and his workrate.

== Career statistics ==
As of match played 26 April 2014.

Club	Season	League			FA Cup		League Cup		Other		Total	
Club	Season	Division	Apps	Goals	Apps	Goals	Apps	Goals	Apps	Goals	Apps	Goals
Bristol Rovers	2008–09	League One	0	0	0	0	0	0	0	0	0	0
Bristol Rovers	2009–10	League One	23	0	1	0	2	0	1 (Note: Appearance(s) in Football League Trophy)	0	27	0
Bristol Rovers	2010–11	League One	17	0	1	0	1	0	2	2	21	2
Bristol Rovers	2011–12	League Two	0	0	1	0	0	0	0	0	1	0
Bristol Rovers	Total		40	0	3	0	3	0	3	2	49	2
Taunton Town (loan)	2008–09	Southern League Division One South & West	3	0	0	0	—		2 (Note: One appearance in Somerset Premier Cup, one in FA Trophy)	0	5	0
Bath City (loan)	2011–12	Conference Premier	9	0	0	0	—		0	0	9	0
York City	2011–12	Conference Premier	2	0	0	0	—		1 (Note: Appearance in FA Trophy)	0	3	0
Newport County	2012–13	Conference Premier	20	2	2	0	—		1	0	23	2
Bromley	2013–14	Conference South	10	1	2	0	—		3 (Note: One appearance in FA Trophy, one in London Senior Cup, one in Kent Senior Cup)	0	15	1
Dartford	2013–14	Conference Premier	11	0	0	0	—		0	0	11	0
Career total			95	3	7	0	3	0	10	2	113	5
