= Lance Cronin =

English footballer (born 1985)

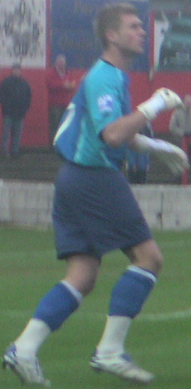

Personal information
- Date of birth: 11 September 1985 (age 41)
- Place of birth: Brighton, England
- Position: Goalkeeper

Youth career
- Brighton & Hove Albion

Senior career*
Years	Team	Apps	(Gls)
2001–2005	Crystal Palace	0	(0)
2005	→ Wycombe Wanderers (loan)	1	(0)
2005–2006	Oldham Athletic	0	(0)
2006	Shrewsbury Town	0	(0)
2006–2010	Ebbsfleet United	176	(0)
2010–2011	Gillingham	7	(0)
2011–2012	Bristol Rovers	1	(0)
2012	→ Ebbsfleet United (loan)	10	(0)
2012–2013	Macclesfield Town	28	(0)
2014–2015	Whitehawk	2	(0)
Total		225	(0)

International career
2006–2015	England C	7	(0)

Managerial career
- 2016: Whitehawk (assistant manager)
- * Club domestic league appearances and goals

Lance Cronin (born 11 September 1985) is an English former professional footballer who played as a goalkeeper. He made seven international appearances for the England C national team. In 2016 he was assistant manager at Whitehawk, the last club he played for.

== Career ==
Cronin was born in Brighton. He came up through the youth system at Crystal Palace. He joined Wycombe Wanderers on loan during the 2004–05 season, where he made one appearance for the club in League Two. He was released by Crystal Palace at the end of the 2004–05 without playing for the first-team and joined Oldham Athletic on a non-contract basis in November 2005 to provide cover for an FA Cup tie against Chasetown, in which he made a substitute appearance. He then joined Shrewsbury Town on non-contract terms in February 2006 to provide cover for regular goalkeeper Joe Hart. Cronin left Shrewsbury in April 2006, and after a trial with Grimsby Town, joined Gravesend and Northfleet (now Ebbsfleet United) to cover a long-term injury to regular goalkeeper Craig Holloway.

After a good start to his first season at Ebbsfleet, Cronin was called up for the England National Game XI (now the England C team) squad for the first time in November 2006, and made his debut against Holland as a substitute nine minutes from time as England won the European Challenge Trophy. Cronin collected a winner's medal when Ebbsfleet won the FA Trophy at Wembley Stadium in May 2008.

In July 2010, he joined Gillingham on a free transfer after a successful trial. He made his debut in a 1–1 draw away to Morecambe on 28 August. Cronin was released from his contract at the end of the 2010–11 season, joining recently relegated Bristol Rovers. He made his Rovers debut in the New Year's Eve match against Crewe Alexandra replacing Scott Bevan at half-time who had conceded four goals in the first half. In February 2012, Cronin re-joined Ebbsfleet United on a month's loan, which was later extended until the end of April 2012. In June 2012, he joined Macclesfield Town having been told he was surplus to requirements at Bristol Rovers. He left the club in May 2013.

In May 2014, he followed his former manager at Macclesfield Town Steve King to Whitehawk, having taken a year out of football to set up his own business. Cronin was appointed Assistant Manager at Whitehawk under Pablo Asensio after King was sacked in January 2016. He left after two games of the 2016–17 season, for personal reasons.

== Personal life ==
In 2012, Cronin set up Repainted, a painting and property maintenance company.

Cronin founded the Lance Cronin Football Academy.

== Honours ==
- FA Trophy: 2008
