= Michael Boateng =

English footballer

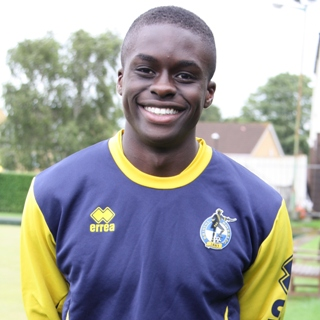
- Boateng in 2011 with Bristol Rovers

Personal information
- Full name: Michael Kwame Adusei Boateng
- Date of birth: 17 August 1991 (age 35)
- Place of birth: Peckham, London, England
- Height: 5 ft 11 in (1.80 m)
- Position: Right back

Youth career
- 2005–2007: Crystal Palace
- 2008–2010: Woking

Senior career*
Years	Team	Apps	(Gls)
2010–2011	Carshalton Athletic		
2011–2012	Bristol Rovers	0	(0)
2011	→ Tonbridge Angels (loan)	10	(1)
2011–2012	→ Sutton United (loan)	25	(0)
2012	Bromley	1	(0)
2012–2013	Sutton United	12	(0)
2013	Newport County	3	(0)
2013	Whitehawk	16	(0)
Total		67	(1)
- * Club domestic league appearances and goals

Michael Kwame Adusei Boateng (born 17 August 1991) is a former professional footballer who played primarily as a right back. He was sentenced in 2014 to 16 months' imprisonment for his part in an attempted match-fixing fraud, and has twice served time in prison for drug dealing offences.

== Early life ==
As a youngster growing up he played for Addiscombe Corinthians. He attended Archbishop Tenison's School from 2002 to 2007 where he was a regular in the school team. He was an academy player at Crystal Palace before being released.

== Club career ==
=== Early career ===
Born in Peckham, London, Boateng was a youth player at Woking, this was the period of time he had a growth spurt, where he featured heavily and appeared for their reserves. In July 2010, he signed for Carshalton Athletic, where he was their starting right back and put in performances which built up some interest.

=== Bristol Rovers ===
During the start of preseason for the 2011–12 season he was invited on a two-week trial with Bristol Rovers, where he featured in several friendlies. In July 2011 he signed for Bristol Rovers on a one-year contract with a further year option.

In an interview in the Bristol Evening Post, Boateng expressed his delight in joining the team: "To have a chance in the professional game is all I've ever wanted. My family are delighted for me. I'm sad to be moving away from them in London, but I am really happy to be starting what is a new chapter in my life."

He made his debut for Bristol Rovers on 6 September 2011, when he came on as a 76th-minute substitute for Danny Woodards in a Football League Trophy match against Wycombe Wanderers.

Soon after, Boateng went on a two-month loan to Tonbridge Angels, and then to Sutton United in December.

=== Non-league ===
Following his release from Bristol Rovers, he had trials at Oxford United, Bradford City and Mansfield Town.

In October 2012, Boateng signed for Bromley. He made his debut on 14 October 2012, in Bromley's non-league day match against local rivals Welling United.

He left Bromley in November 2012 and returned to Sutton United. In March 2013 Boateng joined Newport County, he was released in May 2013 following their promotion to League Two.

=== Match fixing charges ===
After his departure from Newport, Boateng joined Whitehawk but on 5 December 2013, he was charged with conspiracy to defraud as part of an investigation into match-fixing. He was sacked by Whitehawk the following day.

In January 2015, Boateng was given a lifetime ban from football for admitting the charges of conspiracy to commit bribery.

== Career statistics ==
Appearances and goals by club, season and competition
Club	Season	League			FA Cup		League Cup		Other		Total	
Club	Season	Division	Apps	Goals	Apps	Goals	Apps	Goals	Apps	Goals	Apps	Goals
Bristol Rovers	2011–12	League Two	0	0	0	0	0	0	1 (Note: Appearance(s) in Football League Trophy)	0	1	0
→ Tonbridge Angels (loan)	2011–12	Conference South	10	1	0	0	0	0	0	0	10	1
→ Sutton United (loan)	2011–12	Conference South	25	0	0	0	0	0	0	0	25	0
Bromley	2012–13	Conference South	1	0	0	0	0	0	0	0	1	0
Sutton United	2012–13	Conference South	12	0	0	0	0	0	3 (Note: Appearance(s) in FA Trophy)	0	15	0
Newport County	2012–13	Conference Premier	3	0	0	0	0	0	0	0	3	0
Whitehawk	2013–14	Conference South	16	0	0	0	0	0	0	0	16	0
Career total			67	1	0	0	0	0	4	0	71	1

== Style of play ==
Boateng is an athletic full back and known for his adventurous play and surging runs.

== Personal life ==
Boateng worked for a time as a personal trainer and was also co-host on the podcast Banged Up where he talks about his time in prison.

== Later criminal activity ==
In June 2014, Boateng was sentenced to 16 months in prison for match fixing.

In June 2015, Boateng was sent to prison for a second time for drug dealing.

On 16 February 2024, Boateng appeared in court charged with possessing Class A drug methamphetamine with intent to supply. His home was raided on Valentine's Day in 2024 and he was caught with 19.6 kg of the drug, worth up to £1.5m – which was one of the biggest seizures of crystal meth in the UK. On 10 September 2024, Boateng admitted possessing crystal meth, cocaine and MDMA with intent to supply. In August 2025, he was jailed for 14 years.
