= Queen Elizabeth II Law Courts, Birmingham =

Judicial building in Birmingham, England

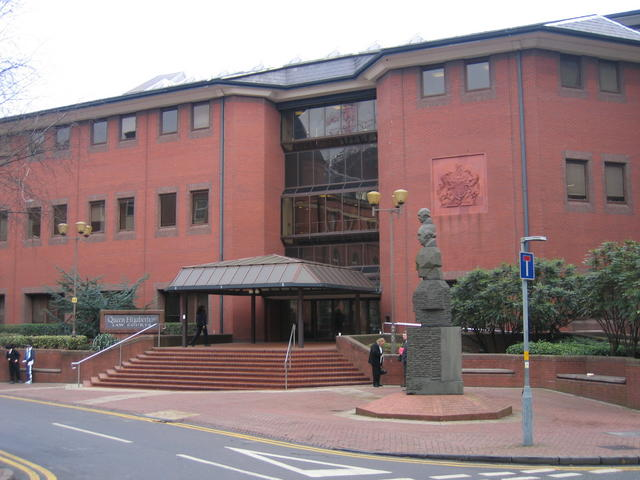
- Queen Elizabeth II Law Courts, Birmingham

- Shown in the West Midlands
- 52.4829°N 1.8923°W
- Location: Dalton Street, Birmingham

History
- Built: 1987

Site notes
- Architect: Property Services Agency
- Architectural style: Modernist style

The Queen Elizabeth II Law Courts is a Crown Court venue, which deals with criminal cases, in Dalton Street, Birmingham, England.

== History ==
Until the mid-1980s, all Crown Court cases were heard in the Victoria Law Courts in Corporation Street. However, as the number of court cases in Birmingham grew, it became necessary to commission a more modern courthouse for criminal matters. The site selected by the Lord Chancellor's Department was a short remaining section of John Watt Street which had been severed by the construction of the James Watt Queensway.

The new building was designed by Property Services Agency, built in red brick with terracotta dressings at a cost of £8.9 million, and was completed in 1987. The design involved an asymmetrical main frontage facing onto Dalton Street. The central section, which was projected forward, featured a full-height glass atrium to the right of centre. A carved terracotta Royal coat of arms was installed on the first floor to the right of the atrium. Short canted sections connected the central section to the wings. The whole structure was fenestrated by small square windows with architraves. Internally, the building was laid out to accommodate twelve courtrooms.

A sculpture by Vincent Woropay carved in black Indian granite and depicting a series of busts of the engineer, James Watt, in the style of Egyptian obelisks and Native American totem poles and known as the "Wattilisk" was unveiled outside the building shortly after it opened.

== Notable cases ==
Notable cases have included the trial and conviction of three men, in June 2014, in connection with the 2013 English football match-fixing scandal, the trial and conviction, in October 2014, of Barry Williams for possessing a prohibited firearm, putting a neighbour in fear of violence, and making an improvised explosive device, and the trial and conviction, in August 2019, of Louise Porton for murdering her two children.
