= Kayne McLaggon =

Welsh footballer

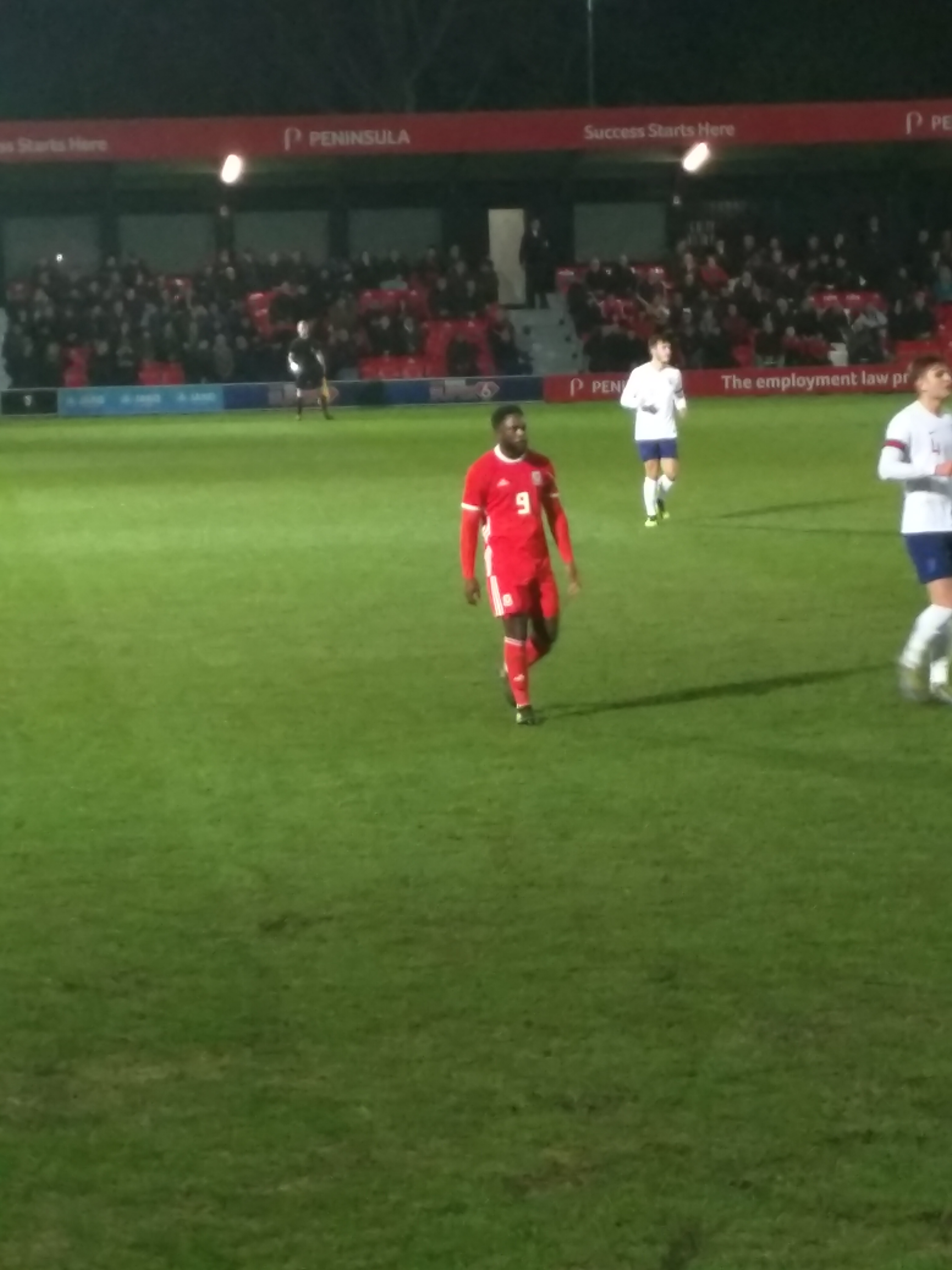
- McLaggon playing for Wales C in 2019

Personal information
- Full name: Kayne Simeon McLaggon
- Date of birth: 21 September 1990 (age 36)
- Place of birth: Barry, Wales
- Height: 5 ft 9 in (1.75 m)
- Position: Striker

Youth career
- Southampton

Senior career*
Years	Team	Apps	(Gls)
2008–2010	Southampton	7	(1)
2009	→ Eastbourne Borough (loan)	3	(1)
2010–2011	Salisbury City		
2011–2012	Bristol Rovers	1	(0)
2011	→ Tonbridge Angels (loan)	10	(2)
2012–2013	Weston-super-Mare	30	(6)
2013–2017	Merthyr Town		
2017–2025	Barry Town United	187	(103)
2025–2026	Newport City	22	(6)

International career
2006–2008	Wales U17	9	(2)
2007–2008	Wales U19	6	(0)
2019–2021	Wales C	2	(1)
- * Club domestic league appearances and goals as of 23:05, 3 February 2026 (UTC)

Kayne Simeon McLaggon (born 21 September 1990) is a Welsh former footballer who played as a striker.

== Club career ==
=== Southampton ===
McLaggon was born in Barry, Vale of Glamorgan and went to Barry Comprehensive School from where he joined the Southampton Academy. He came up through the ranks of the Saints youth system, signing professional forms in September 2007 on his 17th birthday.

He was given the number 42 shirt ahead of Southampton's Championship fixture on 26 December 2008 at Home Park against Plymouth Argyle and made his first team debut as a second half substitute, replacing Lee Holmes after 58 minutes. He then starred on his home debut on 28 December, coming off the bench against Reading and setting up Saints' opening goal with a pacy run out of midfield, before supplying David McGoldrick, who finished well past Adam Federici in the Reading goal.

McLaggon scored his first Southampton goal on 27 January 2009, scoring the first of two goals towards Southampton's comeback against Norwich City.

He joined Conference National team Eastbourne Borough on a month's loan on 11 November 2009 after recovering from a long-term injury.

=== Salisbury City ===
He was released by Southampton on 15 May 2010 and joined Salisbury City on 4 August. He went on to form a good partnership with Jake Reid.

=== Bristol Rovers ===
On 11 July 2011, McLaggon signed a one-year contract with Bristol Rovers.

=== Weston-super-Mare ===
On 6 September 2012, McLaggon signed for Weston-super-Mare. He scored his first goal for the club on 6 November 2012 in a 4–3 loss to Frome Town in the Somerset Premier Cup. On 26 March 2013, McLaggon scored his first hattrick for the club in a 3–1 win, away to Sutton United.

=== Merthyr Town ===
On 14 October 2013, McLaggon signed for Merthyr Town. He made his debut for Merthyr against Slough Town on 19 October 2013 and scored his first goal from the penalty spot. On 29 April 2014, he scored two goals as Merthyr beat Swindon Supermarine 5–2 to reach the Southern League Division 1 South and West play-off final.

=== Barry Town United ===
On 8 June 2017, McLaggon signed for hometown club Barry Town United on a two-year contract.

=== Newport City ===
McLaggon joined Cymru South side Newport City in July 2025.

== International career ==
McLaggon has won nine Welsh under-17 caps (with two goals) and six at under-19 level.

In March 2019, he was called up for the Wales C team and scored on his debut on 20 March in a 2–2 draw with England.

== Honours ==
Individual

- Welsh Premier League Team of the Year: 2017–18
