= Will Hoskins =

English footballer

Personal information
- Full name: William Richard Hoskins
- Date of birth: 6 May 1986 (age 40)
- Place of birth: Nottingham, England
- Height: 5 ft 11 in (1.80 m)
- Position: Forward

Team information
- Current team: Kings Langley (Player-Coach)

Youth career
- Notts County
- –2003: Rotherham United

Senior career*
Years	Team	Apps	(Gls)
2003–2007	Rotherham United	73	(23)
2007–2010	Watford	60	(7)
2007	→ Millwall (loan)	10	(2)
2008	→ Nottingham Forest (loan)	2	(0)
2010–2011	Bristol Rovers	43	(17)
2011–2014	Brighton & Hove Albion	18	(1)
2012	→ Sheffield United (loan)	12	(2)
2014–2015	Oxford United	4	(0)
2015–2016	Exeter City	8	(1)
2017–2018	Hemel Hempstead Town	19	(3)
2018	Northcote City		
2020–	Kings Langley	10	(2)

International career
2004	England U18	1	(0)
2004	England U19	1	(0)
2005	England U20	3	(0)
- * Club domestic league appearances and goals as of 21:04, 28 August 2021 (UTC)

William Richard Hoskins (born 6 May 1986) is an English footballer who plays for Spartan South Midlands League Premier Division club Kings Langley, where he plays as a forward.

== Playing career ==
=== Rotherham United ===
Hoskins was born in Nottingham, Nottinghamshire, where his career began at local club Notts County's School of Excellence, before he joined Rotherham United's youth system in South Yorkshire. Hoskins was heralded as a talent when, at just 17, he came into the first team fold at Rotherham and made an impact, scoring both goals in a 2–1 win at Wigan Athletic in December 2003. However, he had a stop–start early career, only making one start under managers Ronnie Moore and subsequently Mick Harford.

Alan Knill took over as manager halfway through the 2005–06 season, with the Millers halfway through their first campaign back in League One, and saved the club from a second successive relegation. As youth coach Knill brought Hoskins up through the youth ranks at Millmoor and handed him 12 further starts that season. Hoskins reciprocated the faith shown in him by being the only one of six out-of-contract players at the end of the 2005–06 season to sign an immediate contract renewal. Knill offered the youngster an initial one-year deal, stating that, should Hoskins prove himself in the first team, he would be rewarded with a new contract before Christmas.

Hoskins had an excellent 2006–07 pre-season alongside his new strike partner Delroy Facey, notably scoring twice against Scottish Cup finalists Gretna. However, he suffered a slight injury before the first match of the season and Dave Hibbert had to step up to take his place. Hoskins returned to the squad less than a week later, coming on as a second-half substitute against Huddersfield Town. The following week he came off the bench to score the winner against Blackpool, securing his place in the starting eleven for the Millers. He was in the team consistently, but never had a regular strike partner due to injuries.

By the end of December he had scored 15 goals in 22 appearances—seven of those in successive away games—making him the third highest scorer in League One. Due to his consistent excellent performances he was awarded the Player of the Month award in October and was valued at an estimated £750,000+ by The Guardian.

=== Watford ===
After turning down a contract extension, Hoskins signed for Premier League club Watford along with teammate Lee Williamson on 5 January 2007 for a combined fee of £1.2 million. He made his debut on 13 January 2007 after coming off the bench against Liverpool. He struggled to make an impact at Watford in the 2007–08 campaign, making only three appearances. He did move on loan to League One club Millwall in September 2007, where he made 12 appearances, netting four goals in his spell. He then returned to Watford and after months of speculation, he signed for Nottingham Forest on loan.

Hoskins completed his transfer to Nottingham Forest on 8 February 2008, joining the club on loan for the rest of the season, with Forest having the option of signing Hoskins permanently in the summer for £500,000. He made his debut in a 2–0 win over Millwall at the City Ground and impressed in his first two games in a Reds shirt, being credited for his liveliness and willingness to work hard. He endured a frustrating spell on the sidelines with a troublesome back injury, and with Brett Ormerod joining from Preston North End, Hoskins returned to Watford.

On 12 August 2008, Hoskins scored his first goal for Watford, an 88th-minute winner against Bristol Rovers in the first round of the 2008–09 League Cup. On 24 January 2009, Hoskins scored the third goal in the sixty-seventh minute which led to the 4–3 victory against Crystal Palace in the third round of the FA Cup.

=== Bristol Rovers ===
In June 2010, Hoskins signed a two-year contract with Bristol Rovers. During the early parts of the season, he boasted a 1:2 goal to game ratio after a great start to the 2010–11 League One campaign. On 6 November 2010 during an FA Cup first round tie against Darlington, he suffered a sprained ankle injury, ruling him out for around four weeks, but came off the bench two weeks later away to Brighton & Hove Albion. In March 2011, with Bristol Rovers struggling, Hoskins was said to be leaving Rovers at the end of the season. He signed a deal with the League One champions Brighton & Hove Albion after Bristol Rovers were relegated from League One.

=== Brighton & Hove Albion ===
On 20 May 2011, Hoskins joined Championship club Brighton & Hove Albion on a two-year deal for an undisclosed fee. He played 45 minutes in Brighton's first pre-season game of the season against Burgess Hill. He played the second half, partnering Craig Mackail-Smith, and scored a low drive from 30 yards after some neat play from Jamie Smith. He scored his first competitive goal for Brighton on his début against Cardiff City in a 3–1 win away from home. Craig Mackail-Smith released him with a through ball and he smashed the ball in the net with a fantastic finish to put Brighton 3–0 up. On 31 January 2012 Hoskins joined Sheffield United on loan for the rest of the season. Hoskins was forced to cut his loan spell short with Sheffield United and return to Brighton just before the end of the season due a hernia problem. His second Brighton goal came as they knocked out Premier League club Newcastle United of the FA Cup on 5 January 2013.

=== Exeter City ===
On 2 July 2015, Hoskins joined Exeter City on trial alongside Alex Fisher. Following a successful trial period, he joined City permanently on 30 July. Hoskins came on to score a late winner on his debut against Yeovil Town.

=== Hemel Hempstead Town ===
In November 2017, Hoskins joined Hemel Hempstead Town of the National League South. He made 22 appearances during the 2017–18 season, scoring four goals as the team finished 5th, qualifying for the play-offs.

=== Kings Langley ===
On 3 January 2020, Hoskins signed for Southern League Premier Division Central club Kings Langley, he was named as a substitute for a home fixture against Nuneaton Borough on 4 January 2020, Hoskins came on as a 57th minute substitute for Steve Ward, and helped his new club to a 2–0 victory. He made five appearances and scored two goals for the club.

== International career ==
Hoskins made an immediate impact when first introduced into the England U-18 squad, setting up the winning goal against Sweden on 29 April 2004. He made his full first team debut for the International U20s team in the 4–0 defeat to Russia on 16 August 2005 in Moscow.
