= Darren Jefferies =

English footballer

Personal information
- Date of birth: 17 October 1993 (age 33)
- Place of birth: Swindon, England
- Height: 6 ft 0 in (1.83 m)
- Position: Midfielder

Team information
- Current team: Frome Town

Youth career
- 2009–2010: Bristol Rovers

Senior career*
Years	Team	Apps	(Gls)
2010–2012	Bristol Rovers	1	(0)
2012–2013	Frome Town	38	(3)
2015–	Frome Town	32	(3)
- * Club domestic league appearances and goals as of 21:36, 4 July 2012 (UTC)

Darren Jefferies (born 17 October 1993) is a professional footballer who plays as a plays as a midfielder. He resigned for Frome Town in September 2015 after a spell with BK sport in Swedish Football Division 3. He began his career with Bristol Rovers.

He was awarded his first professional contract in 2010, when he was given a 2 1/2-year deal by Bristol Rovers on his seventeenth birthday after being a regular for the under-18s team, captaining them at the age of 17. Also a regular in the reserves sides and was an unused substitute for the first team regularly. He made his debut for The Pirates as a 67th-minute replacement for Oliver Norburn in an FA Cup second-round tie on 4 December 2011.

His first goal for Frome Town came away at Cambridge City and proved to be the winning goal in a 2–1 win. He went on to net 3 times in 38 appearances for the Robins before a move to Sweden in search of full-time football in April 2013. On 2 April, he signed for division 3 side BK sport in Sweden.
