= Lamar Powell =

English footballer

Personal information
- Full name: Lamar Levi Powell
- Date of birth: 3 September 1993 (age 33)
- Place of birth: Bristol, England
- Position: Forward

Youth career
- 2005: Shire Colts
- 2005–2010: Bristol Rovers

Senior career*
Years	Team	Apps	(Gls)
2010–2012	Bristol Rovers	1	(0)
2012	Bath City	1	(0)
2013	Weston-super-Mare	0	(0)
2014	Weymouth	0	(0)
- * Club domestic league appearances and goals

Lamar Levi Powell (born 3 September 1993) is an English former professional footballer.

== Early life ==
Powell is from the Stoke Bishop area of Bristol, and attended Cotham School in the city. He later went to Filton College (now part of South Gloucestershire and Stroud College), where he studied towards a BTEC qualification in sport.

== Footballing career ==
Powell started out playing football at under-8s level for Bristol-based youth football team Shire Colts, before joining the Bristol Rovers youth system at the age of 11. He was fast-tracked into the club's under-18 side when he was still aged 16 after having scored 52 goals for the under-16s during the 2008–09 season, and was included in a first team matchday squad for the first time on 1 May 2010, when he was an unused substitute in a 3–0 home defeat at the hands of Norwich City.

He signed his first professional contract two months after his seventeenth birthday, when he put his name to a two-year deal on 19 November 2010. He was an unused substitute five times during the 2010–11 season before making his senior debut on 16 April 2011 when he came on as an 86th-minute replacement for player-manager Stuart Campbell.

He was released by Rovers at the end of the 2012–13 season, before eventually signing for Bath City on a short-term deal in September 2012. He was included in the Romans' squad to face Bromley on 8 September, and was brought on as a half-time substitute, but after suffering an asthma attack less than half an hour after coming on he had to be substituted himself. Lamar joined Weston-super-Mare in October 2013. In February 2014 Lamar joined Weymouth on non-contract terms.
