= Charlie Reece =

English footballer (born 1988)

Personal information
- Full name: Charles Thomas Reece
- Date of birth: 8 September 1988 (age 38)
- Place of birth: Birmingham, England
- Height: 6 ft 0 in (1.83 m)
- Position: Midfielder

Youth career
- 2004–2006: Aston Villa
- 2006–2007: Bristol Rovers

Senior career*
| Years | Team | Apps | (Gls) |
| 2007–2012 | Bristol Rovers | 40 | (0) |
| 2009 | → Solihull Moors (loan) | | |
| 2011 | → Gloucester City (loan) | 12 | (4) |
| 2012 | → Tamworth (loan) | 7 | (?) |
| 2012–2013 | Worcester City | 32 | (?) |
- * Club domestic league appearances and goals as of 23:40, 23 December 2014 (UTC)

Charles Thomas Reece (born 8 September 1988) is an English former footballer who played as a midfielder and is now a business development manager at TripleFast Middle East Ltd.

== Career ==
Born in Birmingham, West Midlands, Reece played for Aston Villa as a youth but was not awarded a scholarship with them. Upon being released he was a member of the Bristol Rovers youth team, based at the Bristol Academy of Sport until being awarded his first professional contract in the summer of 2007. He made his first-team debut in a Football League game against Carlisle United on 29 December 2007, when he came on as a substitute for Sammy Igoe late in the game.

He joined Solihull Moors on a month-long loan during the 2008–09 season. On the final day of the 2008-09 season, he was given his first ever Rovers start against Hartlepool. After an exceptional performance, Reece was awarded Man of the Match. In the 2010-11 season, Reece finally got starting into the squad, after an impressive display after coming on during the 2–1 defeat to Swindon. However, he has gone from central midfield, onto the right, as he believes doing this will make him more likely to get into the squad.

During the pre-season of 2011–12 new manager Paul Buckle informed Reece he would not be featuring in his plans and would be allowed to leave Bristol Rovers on a free transfer. On 20 October 2011, Reece joined Gloucester City on loan.

Reece joined Conference National side Tamworth on 30 January 2012 on a monthlong loan deal.
