= 2008–09 Bristol Rovers F.C. season =

Bristol Rovers F.C.
2008–09 season
- Chairman: Nick Higgs
- Manager: Paul Trollope
- League One: 11th
- FA Cup: 1st round (Eliminated by AFC Bournemouth)
- Carling Cup: 1st round (Eliminated by Watford)
- Johnstone's Paint Trophy: 1st round (Eliminated by AFC Bournemouth)
- Top goalscorer: League: Rickie Lambert – 29; All: Rickie Lambert – 29
- Highest home attendance: 10,293 (vs. Leeds United FC) 7 March 2009)
- Lowest home attendance: 5,870 (vs. Crewe Alexandra) 27 September 2009)
| Home colours | Away colours | Third colours |

During 2008 and 2009, Bristol Rovers Football Club participated in League One, The 2008–09 season covers the period from 1 July 2008 to 30 June 2009. It marks the 126th year of football played by Bristol Rovers F.C. and their 82nd season in The Football League.

== Chronological list of events ==
This is a list of the significant events to occur at the club during the 2007–08 season, presented in chronological order. This list does not include transfers, which are listed in the transfers section below, or match results, which are in the results section.

- 14 July: Former player Junior Agogo completed a transfer from Nottingham Forest to Egyptian side El Zamalek, earning Rovers an undisclosed amount of money from the sell-on clause agreed when he joined Forest.
- 5 August: Club chairman Ron Craig stepped down from his position, and was succeeded by Nick Higgs. Craig retained a position on the board of the football club.
- 11 August: Defender Danny Coles signed a two-year extension to his contract with the club. The new deal expires in the summer of 2012, and was agreed as a result of Rovers receiving a number of transfer bids for the player from Plymouth Argyle.
- 23 August: Rovers stunned Hereford United with a 6–1 demolition.

== Match results ==
=== Legend ===
| Win | Draw | Loss |

=== League One ===
| Date | Opponent | Venue | Result | Attendance | Scorers | League pos | Ref. |
|---|---|---|---|---|---|---|---|
| 9 August | Carlisle United | Home | 2–3 | 8,285 | Lambert, Williams | 16th | |
| 16 August | Brighton & Hove Albion | Away | 1–1 | 6,210 | Lambert (penalty) | 20th | |
| 23 August | Hereford United | Home | 6–1 | 6,735 | Duffy (2), Lambert (2), Hughes, Lines | 8th | |
| 30 August | Leeds United | Away | 2–2 | 21,064 | Lambert, Duffy | 11th | |
| 6 September | Peterborough United | Away | 4–5 | 4,876 | Elliott, own goal, Hughes, Lambert | 15th | |
| 13 September | Walsall | Home | 1–3 | 6,609 | Elliott | 19th | |
| 16 September | Cheltenham Town | Away | 1–2 | 4,546 | Lambert | 21st | |
| 20 September | Yeovil Town | Away | 2–2 | 5,748 | Lambert (penalty), Kuffour | 19th | |
| 27 September | Crewe Alexandra | Home | 0–0 | 5,870 | – | 19th | |
| 4 October | Colchester United | Away | 1–0 | 4,811 | Lambert | 15th | |
| 11 October | Leyton Orient | Home | 2–1 | 6,425 | Coles, Hinton | 11th | |
| 18 October | Huddersfield Town | Away | 1–1 | 13,779 | Lambert | 13th | |
| 21 October | Oldham Athletic | Home | 2–0 | 6,379 | Lambert, Lines | 12th | |
| 25 October | Southend United | Home | 4–2 | 7,055 | Lambert (4) | 11th | |
| 1 November | Leicester City | Away | 1–2 | 18,941 | Kuffour | 13th | |
| 14 November | Scunthorpe United | Home | 1–2 | 7,173 | Lambert | 13th | |
| 22 November | Swindon Town | Home | 2–2 | 8,016 | Lambert, Lines | 14th | |
| 25 November | Hartlepool United | Away | 1–1 | 3,171 | Hughes | 15th | |
| 6 December | Millwall | Away | 2–3 | 8,123 | Lambert, Kuffour | 15th | |
| 13 December | Tranmere Rovers | Home | 2–0 | 6,217 | Kuffour, Lines | 14th | |
| 20 December | Stockport County | Away | 1–3 | 5,364 | Disley | 15th | |
| 26 December | Milton Keynes Dons | Home | 1–2 | 9,002 | Kuffour | 16th | |
| 28 December | Northampton Town | Away | 0–0 | 5,557 | – | 16th | |
| 17 January | Leyton Orient | Away | 2–1 | 4,262 | Hughes, Duffy | 17th | |
| 24 January | Colchester United | Home | 0–0 | 6,634 | – | 17th | |
| 27 January | Cheltenham Town | Home | 3–2 | 6,600 | Lambert (2), Duffy | 12th | |
| 31 January | Southend United | Away | 0–1 | 7,234 | – | 14th | |
| 14 February | Scunthorpe United | Away | 2–0 | 4,156 | Duffy, Kuffour | 14th | |
| 17 February | Yeovil Town | Home | 3–0 | 8,049 | Pipe, Duffy, Lambert | 13th | |
| 21 February | Leicester City | Home | 0–1 | 9,138 | – | 14th | |
| 24 February | Oldham Athletic | Away | 2–0 | 3,745 | Duffy, Anthony | 14th | |
| 28 February | Carlisle United | Away | 1–1 | 5,343 | Hughes | 14th | |
| 7 March | Leeds United | Home | 2–2 | 10,293 | Hughes, Kuffour | 14th | |
| 10 March | Hereford United | Away | 3–0 | 3,199 | Lambert (3) | 14th | |
| 14 March | Walsall | Away | 5–0 | 5,169 | Duffy (2), Disley, Lescott (2) | 12th | |
| 17 March | Crewe Alexandra | Away | 1–1 | 3,879 | Duffy | 12th | |
| 21 March | Peterborough United | Home | 0–1 | 7,103 | – | 13th | |
| 28 March | Stockport County | Home | 2–0 | 6,214 | Anthony, Lambert | 12th | |
| 31 March | Huddersfield Town | Home | 1–2 | 6,286 | Kuffour | 14th | |
| 5 April | Tranmere Rovers | Away | 0–2 | 8,119 | – | 14th | |
| 10 April | Northampton Town | Home | 1–0 | 6,666 | Kuffour | 11th | |
| 13 April | Milton Keynes Dons | Away | 1–2 | 10,251 | Elliott | 12th | |
| 18 April | Millwall | Home | 4–2 | 6,618 | Disley, Lambert (2), Kuffour | 11th | |
| 21 April | Brighton & Hove Albion | Home | 1–2 | 6,193 | Lambert | 11th | |
| 25 April | Swindon Town | Away | 1–2 | 10,977 | Duffy | 12th | |
| 2 May | Hartlepool United | Home | 4–1 | 7,363 | Kuffour, Duffy, Lambert, Lescott | 11th | |

=== FA Cup ===
| Date | Round | Opponent | Venue | Result | Attendance | Scorers |
|---|---|---|---|---|---|---|
| 8 November | 1 | AFC Bournemouth | Away | 0–1 | 3,935 | |

=== Carling Cup ===
| Date | Round | Opponent | Venue | Result | Attendance | Scorers |
|---|---|---|---|---|---|---|
| 12 August | 1 | Watford | Away | 0–1 | 5,574 | |

=== Johnstone's Paint Trophy ===
| Date | Round | Opponent | Venue | Result | Attendance | Scorers |
|---|---|---|---|---|---|---|
| 2 September | 1 | AFC Bournemouth | Away | 0–3 | 2,220 | |

== Team kit ==
The team kit for the 2008–09 season is produced by Erreà. The main shirt sponsor is Cowlin Construction, a subsidiary of Balfour Beatty, and the secondary shirt sponsor is Blackthorn Cider. The home shirt features the traditional blue and white quarters in a lighter shade of blue from the previous season to match the colour of the sponsor's logo, and the away kit is green with black trim.

| 2007–08 home colours | 2008–09 away colours |

== Squad ==
| No. | Pos | Nat | Player | Total | | League 1 | | FA Cup | | Carling Cup | | Johnstone's Paint Trophy | |
| No. | Pos | Nat | Player | Apps | Goals | Apps | Goals | Apps | Goals | Apps | Goals | Apps | Goals |
|---|---|---|---|---|---|---|---|---|---|---|---|---|---|
| 1 | GK | (England) ENG | Steve Phillips | 49 | 0 | 46 | 0 | 1 | 0 | 1 | 0 | 1 | 0 |
| 13 | GK | (England) ENG | Mike Green | 0 | 0 | 0 | 0 | 0 | 0 | 0 | 0 | 0 | 0 |
| 21 | GK | (England) ENG | Danzelle St Louis-Hamilton | 0 | 0 | 0 | 0 | 0 | 0 | 0 | 0 | 0 | 0 |
| 2 | DF | (Wales) WAL | Ryan Green | 28 | 0 | 26 | 0 | 1 | 0 | 0 | 0 | 1 | 0 |
| 3 | DF | (Wales) WAL | Joe Jacobson | 22 | 0 | 22 | 0 | 0 | 0 | 0 | 0 | 0 | 0 |
| 5 | DF | (England) ENG | Craig Hinton | 27 | 1 | 25 | 1 | 1 | 0 | 0 | 0 | 1 | 0 |
| 6 | DF | (England) ENG | Steve Elliott | 41 | 3 | 39 | 3 | 0 | 0 | 1 | 0 | 1 | 0 |
| 15 | DF | (Wales) WAL | Byron Anthony | 33 | 2 | 30 | 2 | 1 | 0 | 1 | 0 | 1 | 0 |
| 16 | DF | (England) ENG | Danny Coles | 5 | 1 | 5 | 1 | 0 | 0 | 0 | 0 | 0 | 0 |
| 21 | DF | (England) ENG | Tom Parrinello | 0 | 0 | 0 | 0 | 0 | 0 | 0 | 0 | 0 | 0 |
| 24 | DF | (England) ENG | Alex Kite | 0 | 0 | 0 | 0 | 0 | 0 | 0 | 0 | 0 | 0 |
| 25 | DF | (England) ENG | James Tyrell | 0 | 0 | 0 | 0 | 0 | 0 | 0 | 0 | 0 | 0 |
| 32 | DF | (England) ENG | Aaron Lescott | 47 | 3 | 44 | 3 | 1 | 0 | 1 | 0 | 1 | 0 |
| 33 | DF | (England) ENG | Liam Harwood | 0 | 0 | 0 | 0 | 0 | 0 | 0 | 0 | 0 | 0 |
| 4 | MF | (England) ENG | Chris Lines | 48 | 4 | 45 | 4 | 1 | 0 | 1 | 0 | 1 | 0 |
| 7 | MF | (Scotland) SCO | Stuart Campbell | 47 | 0 | 44 | 0 | 1 | 0 | 1 | 0 | 1 | 0 |
| 11 | MF | (Northern Ireland) NIR | Jeff Hughes | 46 | 6 | 43 | 6 | 1 | 0 | 1 | 0 | 1 | 0 |
| 14 | MF | (Wales) WAL | David Pipe | 40 | 1 | 39 | 1 | 0 | 0 | 1 | 0 | 0 | 0 |
| 19 | MF | (England) ENG | Sean Rigg | 10 | 0 | 8 | 0 | 0 | 0 | 1 | 0 | 1 | 0 |
| 20 | MF | (England) ENG | Craig Disley | 47 | 3 | 44 | 3 | 1 | 0 | 1 | 0 | 1 | 0 |
| 22 | MF | (England) ENG | Joe White | 0 | 0 | 0 | 0 | 0 | 0 | 0 | 0 | 0 | 0 |
| 26 | MF | (Wales) WAL | Lewis Haldane | 0 | 0 | 0 | 0 | 0 | 0 | 0 | 0 | 0 | 0 |
| 28 | MF | (England) ENG | Adam Mahdi | 0 | 0 | 0 | 0 | 0 | 0 | 0 | 0 | 0 | 0 |
| 30 | MF | (England) ENG | Charlie Reece | 1 | 0 | 1 | 0 | 0 | 0 | 0 | 0 | 0 | 0 |
| 31 | MF | (England) ENG | Charlie Clough | 0 | 0 | 0 | 0 | 0 | 0 | 0 | 0 | 0 | 0 |
| 36 | MF | (Jamaica) JAM | Richard Langley | 0 | 0 | 0 | 0 | 0 | 0 | 0 | 0 | 0 | 0 |
| 8 | FW | (England) ENG | Andy Williams | 5 | 1 | 4 | 1 | 0 | 0 | 1 | 0 | 0 | 0 |
| 9 | FW | (England) ENG | Rickie Lambert | 48 | 29 | 45 | 29 | 1 | 0 | 1 | 0 | 1 | 0 |
| 10 | FW | (Scotland) SCO | Darryl Duffy | 46 | 13 | 43 | 13 | 1 | 0 | 1 | 0 | 1 | 0 |
| 17 | FW | (England) ENG | Jo Kuffour | 42 | 11 | 41 | 11 | 1 | 0 | 0 | 0 | 0 | 0 |
| 18 | FW | (England) ENG | Ben Hunt | 14 | 0 | 12 | 0 | 1 | 0 | 0 | 0 | 1 | 0 |
| 23 | FW | (England) ENG | Ben Swallow | 0 | 0 | 0 | 0 | 0 | 0 | 0 | 0 | 0 | 0 |
| 27 | FW | (England) ENG | Matt Groves | 0 | 0 | 0 | 0 | 0 | 0 | 0 | 0 | 0 | 0 |
| 29 | FW | (Wales) WAL | Josh Klein-Davies | 0 | 0 | 0 | 0 | 0 | 0 | 0 | 0 | 0 | 0 |
| 34 | FW | (England) ENG | James Fraser | 0 | 0 | 0 | 0 | 0 | 0 | 0 | 0 | 0 | 0 |
| 35 | FW | (England) ENG | Richard Walker | 0 | 0 | 0 | 0 | 0 | 0 | 0 | 0 | 0 | 0 |

=== Goalscorers ===
| Name | League | Cup | Total |
|---|---|---|---|
| Rickie Lambert | 29 | 0 | 29 |
| Darryl Duffy | 13 | 0 | 13 |
| Jo Kuffour | 11 | 0 | 11 |
| Jeff Hughes | 6 | 0 | 6 |
| Chris Lines | 4 | 0 | 4 |
| Craig Disley | 3 | 0 | 3 |
| Steve Elliott | 3 | 0 | 3 |
| Aaron Lescott | 3 | 0 | 3 |
| Byron Anthony | 2 | 0 | 2 |
| Danny Coles | 1 | 0 | 1 |
| Craig Hinton | 1 | 0 | 1 |
| David Pipe | 1 | 0 | 1 |
| Andy Williams | 1 | 0 | 1 |
| Own goals by opposition | 1 | 0 | 1 |

=== Discipline ===
| Name | Red cards | Yellow cards |
|---|---|---|
| Byron Anthony | 2 | 6 |
| Steve Elliott | 1 | 3 |
| Chris Lines | 1 | 3 |
| David Pipe | 0 | 7 |
| Stuart Campbell | 0 | 5 |
| Jeff Hughes | 0 | 5 |
| Rickie Lambert | 0 | 4 |
| Steve Phillips | 0 | 4 |
| Craig Disley | 0 | 3 |
| Jo Kuffour | 0 | 3 |
| Ryan Green | 0 | 2 |
| Aaron Lescott | 0 | 2 |
| Craig Hinton | 0 | 1 |
| Joe Jacobson | 0 | 1 |
| Total: | 4 | 49 |

=== Transfers ===
==== In ====
Seven players have been added to the Bristol Rovers squad since 1 July 2008, in addition to Jeff Hughes who signed at the end of the previous season. Four players were signed from other clubs – Darryl Duffy, who was signed from Swansea City for a fee in the region of £100,000, Ben Hunt, who was signed for free after having been released by West Ham United, Jo Kuffour who was signed from AFC Bournemouth and Liam Harwood who was signed from Carshalton Athletic. Three Bristol Rovers youth players were also awarded their first professional contracts by the club – Ben Swallow, James Tyrell and Joe White, who is the son of former Rovers player Steve White.

| Date | Player | Previous club | Contract | Cost |
|---|---|---|---|---|
| 3 July | (Scotland) Darryl Duffy | Swansea City | 3 years | ~£100,000 |
| 3 July | (England) Ben Hunt | West Ham United | 1 year | Free |
| 3 July | (England) Ben Swallow | Youth team | | N/A |
| 3 July | (England) James Tyrell | Youth team | | N/A |
| 3 July | (England) Joe White | Youth team | | N/A |
| 29 August | (England) Jo Kuffour | AFC Bournemouth | 3 years | £60,000 |
| 1 September | (England) Liam Harwood | Carshalton Athletic | 1 year | Undisclosed |
| 21 November | (Jamaica) Richard Langley | Unattached | Monthly | Free |
| 16 February | (England) Danzelle St Louis-Hamilton | Stoke City | 3 months | Loan |

==== Out ====
| Date | Player | New Club | Contract | Cost |
|---|---|---|---|---|
| 4 July | (England) Richard Walker | Shrewsbury Town | 1 year | Loan |
| 7 July | (Wales) Lewis Haldane | Oxford United | 1 year | Loan |
| 1 August | (England) James Fraser | Lewes | 1 month | Loan |
| 8 August | (Wales) Josh Klein-Davies | Luton Town | 1 month | Loan |
| 9 August | (England) Charlie Clough | Mangotsfield United | 1 month | Loan |
| 12 August | (England) Matt Groves | Tiverton Town | 1 month | Loan |
| 14 August | (England) Adam Mahdi | Cirencester Town | 1 month | Loan |
| 1 September | (England) James Fraser | Tiverton Town | 3 months | Loan |
| 1 September | (England) Andy Williams | Hereford United | 4 months | Loan |
| 12 September | (England) Alex Kite | Oxford City | Loan |
| 19 September | (England) Sean Rigg | Grays Athletic | 1 month | Loan |
| 19 September | (England) Adam Mahdi | Clevedon Town | | Loan |
| 19 September | (England) Ben Swallow | Taunton Town | | Loan |
| 23 September | (England) Joe White | Chippenham Town | 3 months | Loan |
| 10 November | (England) Alex Kite | Chippenham Town | 3 months | Loan |
| 20 November | (England) Ben Swallow | Bridgwater Town | 1 month | Loan |
| 28 November | (Wales) Josh Klein-Davies | Newport County | 1 month | Loan |
