= 2006–07 Bristol Rovers F.C. season =

Bristol Rovers F.C.
2006–07 season
- Chairman: Geoff Dunford (until 1 April); Ron Craig (from 2 April)
- Manager: Paul Trollope
- Football League Two: 6th (promoted via play-offs)
- FA Cup: Fourth Round
- League Cup: Second Round
- Football League Trophy: Runners-up
- Top goalscorer: League: Richard Walker (12); All: Richard Walker (23)
- Highest home attendance: 11,530 (vs Bristol City, 27 February 2007)
- Lowest home attendance: 2,672 (vs Torquay, 17 October 2006)

The 2006–07 season was the 124th year of football played by Bristol Rovers, and their 80th season in The Football League, and covers the period from 1 July 2006 to 30 June 2007. After finishing sixth in Football League Two, Rovers won the playoff final for the first time in their history, and won promotion for only the fourth time since joining The Football League. The previous promotions were all automatic, and came in the 1952–53, 1973–74 and 1989–90 seasons.

The season began with a subdued atmosphere among fans, caused by six previous seasons of poor performances and a bitter boardroom split, resulting in four directors leaving the club. However, as the season progressed the team gradually climbed up the league and reached the fourth round of the FA Cup, and the final of the Football League Trophy.

== Review and events ==
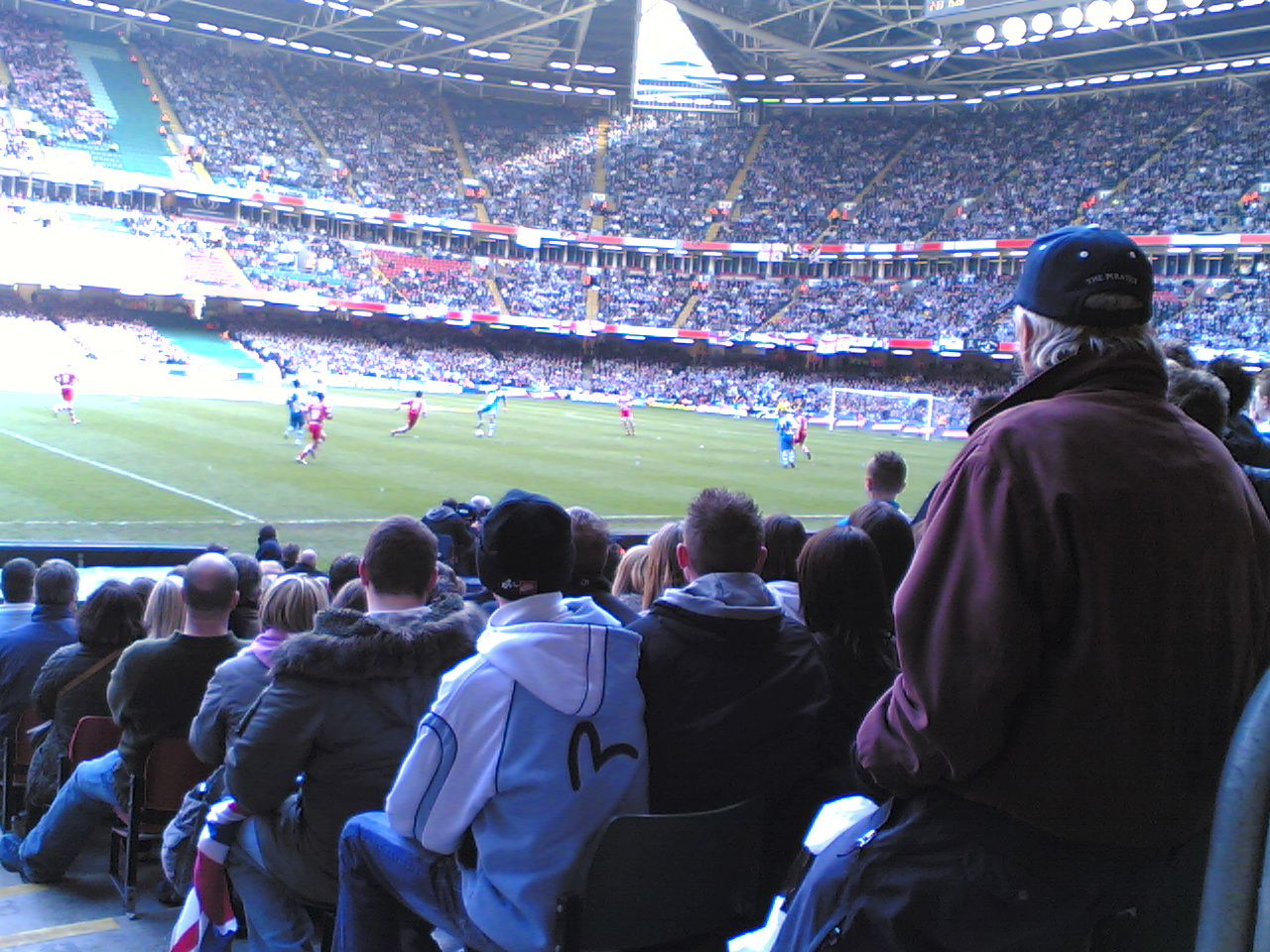
Bristol Rovers playing in the Football League Trophy final at the Millennium Stadium.

The pre-season period was a turbulent one, with a potential take-over of the club by Mike Turl being rejected by then-chairman Geoff Dunford. Directors Kevin Spencer and Colin Williams left the club in protest at the rejection, followed shortly after by the Bristol Rovers Supporters Club representative on the football club's board, Kim Stuckey.

Ryan Green had signed for the club from Hereford United at the end of the previous season, and he was joined by three more new players before the start of the 2006–07 season. Sammy Igoe, who had been on loan at Rovers from Millwall the previous season, joined on a full-time basis, young defender Byron Anthony, who had yet to make an appearance in the Football League, joined from Cardiff City, and experienced goalkeeper Steve Phillips crossed the city to join from local rivals Bristol City.

A number of players left the club following the end of the 2005–06 season. Senior players John Anderson, who had been assistant manager to Paul Trollope during his spell as caretaker manager the previous year, Ali Gibb, Jon Bass and Christian Edwards were released, while Jamie Forrester moved to Lincoln City on a free transfer. Also leaving the club were a number of younger players who had failed to earn extensions to their contracts. These were Mark Preece, Matt Thorne, Ben Willshire and goalkeepers Ryan Clarke and Martin Horsell.

The first game of the season was away to Peterborough United in League Two, and ended in a 4–1 defeat, resulting in the lowest league position, 23rd, that Rovers would occupy all season. As the season progressed, Rovers gradually climbed the league table, eventually clinching a playoff spot after winning their final league match 2–1 against Hartlepool United.

The playoff campaign was high-scoring, with there being an average of 4 2/3 goals per game in the three matches played. The semi-final was against Lincoln City, and was played over two legs. The first leg at the Memorial Stadium was won 2–1 by Rovers, thanks to goals by Craig Disley and Richard Walker. The second leg was played at Sincil Bank and ended 5–3, with Stuart Campbell, Rickie Lambert, Richard Walker, Sammy Igoe and Sean Rigg scoring the goals. This gave Rovers a 7–4 aggregate win and a place in the final at Wembley Stadium. A record attendance for a League Two playoff final of 61,589 watched the game, and saw Rovers win the match 3–1 and gain promotion for only the fourth time in the club's history. Richard Walker scored two of the goals and Sammy Igoe scored the other.

The League Cup campaign was a brief one. Rovers were knocked out in the first round by Luton Town on penalty kicks after drawing the match 1–1. The FA Cup was more successful, with the team reaching the fourth round where they were beaten 1–0 by Derby County. The best cup run of the season was in the Football League Trophy, where they reached the final after beating rivals Bristol City 1–0 in the southern area final. The game was played at the Millennium Stadium in Cardiff, but resulted in a 3–2 defeat after extra time, the score being 2–2 after 90 minutes.

=== Chronological list of events ===
This is a list of the significant events to occur at the club during the 2006–07 season, presented in chronological order. This list does not include transfers, which are listed in the transfers section below, or match results, which are in the results section.

- 28 July: Played a pre-season friendly against Plymouth Argyle wearing pink shirts.
- 22 August: Knocked out of the League Cup at the first round by Luton Town on penalties, having drawn the match 1–1.
- 15 September: The club submit plans for a new 18,000-seat stadium to Bristol City Council.
- 27 September: Rovers record their first win in a home midweek evening game for almost two years. The 2–1 win over Hereford United was the first since beating Chester City 4–1 on 7 December 2004. This was also the first game this season where Rovers scored more than one goal in the match.
- 6 October: Chairman Geoff Dunford announces that he will step down from his position at the end of April 2007, but intends to remain as a director of the club.
- 7 October: Back to back home wins recorded for the first time since May 2005, thanks to a 1–0 win over Boston United following on from the victory over Hereford United the previous week.
- 9 October: Kevin Hodges is appointed as head of youth football. He also takes charge of the reserve team as part of his duties.
- 16 October: Rod King is appointed to the club's board of directors.
- 17 October: Former player Carl Saunders is appointed as the club's Community Liaison Officer.
- 11 November: Sean Rigg suffers a broken jaw after being punched by James Cotterill during an FA Cup first round match at Barrow.
- 10 January: Rovers receive £50,000 as part of the deal taking Scott Sinclair to Chelsea after he makes his debut for the London club.
- 17 January: Bristol City Council grant planning permission for a new 18,000 capacity all-seater stadium to be built on the site of the Memorial Stadium.
- 27 January: Rovers knocked out of the FA Cup in the fourth round by Derby County.
- 27 February: Rovers reach the final of the Football League Trophy by beating rivals Bristol City 1–0 on aggregate over the two legs of the southern area final.
- 29 March: Rovers announce that Ron Craig will succeed Geoff Dunford as chairman of the club from 2 April 2007.
- 1 April: Rovers are beaten 3–2 (after extra time) by Doncaster Rovers in the final of the Football League Trophy at Cardiff's Millennium Stadium.
- 21 April: Byron Anthony signed a new 2-year contract with Rovers, tying him to the club until the end of the 2008–09 season.
- 30 April: Steve Phillips signs a two-year extension to his contract, which was due to expire in summer 2008. This keeps him at the club until 2010.
- 5 May: Rovers finish the season in 6th place, earning a spot in the playoffs.
- 11 May: Mike Green and James Palmer were offered new contracts.
- 16 May: Stuart Campbell signs a new two-year contract.
- 17 May: Rovers beat Lincoln City 5–3 at Sincil Bank to win 7–4 on aggregate and reach their second major final of the season, the League Two play-off final. It was their first appearance at the new Wembley Stadium. Rovers became only the second club to play at both the Millennium Stadium and Wembley in one season behind Chelsea who played the League Cup final at the Millennium Stadium on 25 February 2007 and played the FA Cup final on 19 May 2007.
- 26 May: Rovers beat Shrewsbury Town 3–1 in the Football League Two play-off final at Wembley Stadium to clinch promotion to League One. Richard Walker scored two goals and Sammy Igoe one after having gone 1–0 down. A record crowd for a League Two playoff final of 61,589 watched the game.
- 5 June: The club announce that the first team will play their home games at Whaddon Road in Cheltenham while the Memorial Stadium is being redeveloped. The move is due to happen in December 2007.
- 21 June: Steve Elliott signs a new three-year contract, running until June 2010.

== Match results ==
Bristol Rovers played a total of 62 competitive matches during the 2006–07 season, as well as nine pre-season friendlies, making a total of 71 games played. The team finished sixth in Football League Two, reaching the play-offs for the first time since the 1997–98 season.

In the cup competitions, Rovers were knocked out of the League Cup at the first round stage in a penalty shootout, having drawn 1–1 with Championship side Luton Town after extra time. They fared better in the FA Cup however, reaching the fourth round stage where they lost again to a Championship team; this time Derby County. The most successful cup competition for Rovers was the Football League Trophy, in which they reached the final for the first time since the 1989–90 competition. They were beaten by Doncaster Rovers after extra time at the Millennium Stadium.

=== Legend ===
Win	Draw	Loss

=== Football League Two ===
Date	Opponent	Venue	Result	Position	Attendance	Scorers
5 August	Peterborough United	Away	1–4	23	4,890	Igoe
8 August	Wycombe Wanderers	Home	1–2	22	5,319	Hunt
12 August	Grimsby Town	Home	1–0	16	4,596	Sandell
19 August	Milton Keynes Dons	Away	0–2	19	5,125	
26 August	Shrewsbury Town	Home	1–0	15	4,774	Haldane
3 September	Stockport County	Away	1–2	16	4,846	R Walker
9 September	Rochdale	Home	0–0	17	4,689	
13 September	Torquay United	Away	0–0	18	3,145	
16 September	Darlington	Away	1–1	17	3,654	Haldane
23 September	Walsall	Home	1–2	21	5,260	Sandell
27 September	Hereford United	Home	2–1	18	4,975	R Walker (2)
30 September	Chester City	Away	0–2	19	2,151	
7 October	Boston United	Home	1–0	17	4,327	J Walker
14 October	Notts County	Away	2–1	11	5,797	R Walker, Haldane
21 October	Macclesfield Town	Home	0–0	14	5,130	
28 October	Wrexham	Away	0–2	17	3,803	
4 November	Mansfield Town	Home	1–0	13	5,044	Disley
18 November	Bury	Away	2–0	12	2,635	Haldane, R Walker
26 November	Barnet	Home	2–0	9	5,351	Nicholson, Lambert
5 December	Lincoln City	Away	0–1	11	3,913	
9 December	Hartlepool United	Home	0–2	13	4,906	
16 December	Swindon Town	Away	1–2	15	10,010	R Walker
23 December	Accrington Stanley	Home	4–0	11	5,205	R Walker (2 (1 pen)), Elliott, Nicholson
26 December	Hereford United	Away	0–0	11	5,201	
30 December	Walsall	Away	2–2	13	5,941	Elliott (2)
1 January	Torquay United	Home	1–0	9	6,475	Sandell
13 January	Rochdale	Away	1–0	7	2,547	Lambert
20 January	Chester City	Home	0–0	9	5,694	
3 February	Peterborough United	Home	3–2	9	5,700	Lambert, R Walker, Campbell
6 February	Darlington	Home	1–2	9	5,511	Disley
10 February	Grimsby Town	Away	3–4	10	5,883	Disley (2), Haldane
17 February	Milton Keynes Dons	Home	1–1	10	5,489	Nicholson
24 February	Stockport County	Home	Match postponed (waterlogged pitch)			
2 March	Shrewsbury Town	Away	0–0	14	4,227	
6 March	Accrington Stanley	Away	1–1	15	1,302	R Walker
10 March	Boston United	Away	1–2	16	1,697	Haldane
17 March	Notts County	Home	2–0	13	4,642	Nicholson (2)
20 March	Stockport County	Home	2–1	11	4,725	Lambert (pen), Nicholson
24 March	Wrexham	Home	0–1	11	5,209	
27 March	Wycombe Wanderers	Away	1–0	11	4,299	Elliott
7 April	Mansfield Town	Away	1–0	9	2,392	Elliott
9 April	Bury	Home	2–0	9	6,266	Lambert (2)
14 April	Barnet	Away	1–1	9	2,541	R Walker
21 April	Lincoln City	Home	0–0	9	6,828	
24 April	Macclesfield Town	Away	1–0	8	1,940	Rigg
28 April	Swindon Town	Home	1–0	7	9,902	Lambert
5 May	Hartlepool United	Away	2–1	6	7,629	R Walker, Lambert

=== Football League Two Playoffs ===
Round	Date	Opponent	Venue	Result	Attendance	Goalscorers
Semi-Final Leg 1	12 May	Lincoln City	Home	2–1	10,654	Disley, R Walker
Semi-Final Leg 2	17 May	Lincoln City	Away	5–3	7,694	Campbell, Lambert, R Walker, Igoe, Rigg
Final	26 May	Shrewsbury Town	Wembley Stadium	3–1	61,589	R Walker (2), Igoe

=== FA Cup ===
Round	Date	Opponent	Venue	Result	Attendance	Goalscorers
1	11 November	Barrow	Away	3–2	2,939	R Walker, Disley, Anthony
2	2 December	AFC Bournemouth	Home	1–1	6,252	R Walker (pen)
2 (replay)	12 December	AFC Bournemouth	Away	1–0	4,153	R Walker
3	5 January	Hereford United	Home	1–0	8,978	R Walker (pen)
4	27 January	Derby County	Away	0–1	25,033	

=== League Cup ===
Round	Date	Opponent	Venue	Result	Attendance	Goalscorers	Note
1	22 August	Luton Town	Home	1–1	2,882	R Walker	Lost 5–3 in penalty shoot-out

=== Football League Trophy ===
Round	Date	Opponent	Venue	Result	Attendance	Goalscorers
1	17 October	Torquay United	Home	1–0	2,672	Anthony
2	31 October	Wycombe Wanderers	Away	2–0	1,314	Easter, Igoe
Southern QF	29 November	Peterborough United	Home	1–0	3,621	Nicholson
Southern SF	9 January	Shrewsbury Town	Away	Postponed (waterlogged pitch)		
Southern SF	23 January	Shrewsbury Town	Away	Postponed (frozen pitch)		
Southern SF	30 January	Shrewsbury Town	Away	1–0	3,199	R Walker
Area final leg 1	21 February	Bristol City	Away	0–0	18,730	
Area final leg 2	27 February	Bristol City	Home	1–0	11,530	Lambert
Final	1 April	Doncaster Rovers	Millennium Stadium	2–2; 2–3 aet	59,024	R Walker (pen), Igoe

== League progress ==
This chart shows the league position of Bristol Rovers F.C. over the course of the season. The green area represents the automatic promotion positions (positions 1 to 3), the yellow area represents the play-off positions (positions 4 to 7) and the red area represents the relegation places (positions 23 and 24). The lowest position in the league that Bristol Rovers reached during the course of the season was 23rd, after the first game, and their highest placing was 6th, after the final game.

== Player details ==
During the 2006–07 season, Rovers used 24 different players, and there were nine squad members who did not make an appearance on the pitch. The table below shows the number of appearances and goals scored by each player. Play-off appearances are included in the league appearances column.

No.	Pos	Nat	Player	Total		League Two (including playoffs)		FA Cup		League Cup		Football League Trophy	
No.	Pos	Nat	Player	Apps	Goals	Apps	Goals	Apps	Goals	Apps	Goals	Apps	Goals
1	GK	(England) ENG	Steve Phillips	59	0	47	0	5	0	1	0	6	0
23	GK	(Scotland) SCO	Scott Shearer	3	0	2	0	0	0	0	0	1	0
31	GK	(England) ENG	Mike Green	0	0	0	0	0	0	0	0	0	0
2	DF	(Wales) WAL	Ryan Green	42	0	36	0	2	0	1	0	3	0
3	DF	(Wales) WAL	Joe Jacobson	13	0	13	0	0	0	0	0	0	0
3	DF	(Republic of Ireland) IRL	Robbie Ryan	0	0	0	0	0	0	0	0	0	0
5	DF	(England) ENG	Craig Hinton	38	0	30	0	3	0	0	0	5	0
6	DF	(England) ENG	Steve Elliott	54	5	42	5	5	0	1	0	6	0
11	DF	(England) ENG	Chris Carruthers	54	0	41	0	5	0	1	0	7	0
15	DF	(Wales) WAL	Byron Anthony	33	2	26	0	3	1	1	0	3	1
16	DF	(England) ENG	Samuel Oji	5	0	5	0	0	0	0	0	0	0
21	DF	(England) ENG	Ollie Barnes	0	0	0	0	0	0	0	0	0	0
28	DF	(England) ENG	Tom Parrinello	0	0	0	0	0	0	0	0	0	0
32	DF	(England) ENG	Aaron Lescott	43	0	34	0	4	0	1	0	4	0
35	DF	(England) ENG	Ben Willshire	0	0	0	0	0	0	0	0	0	0
4	MF	(England) ENG	Sammy Igoe	55	5	43	3	5	0	1	0	6	2
7	MF	(Scotland) SCO	Stuart Campbell	57	2	44	2	5	0	1	0	7	0
8	MF	(England) ENG	James Hunt	14	1	14	1	0	0	0	0	0	0
17	MF	(England) ENG	Andy Sandell	48	3	36	3	4	0	1	0	7	0
20	MF	(England) ENG	Craig Disley	61	6	48	5	5	1	1	0	7	0
22	MF	(England) ENG	Chris Lines	9	0	8	0	0	0	0	0	1	0
24	MF	(Wales) WAL	Paul Trollope	0	0	0	0	0	0	0	0	0	0
25	MF	(England) ENG	Darren Mullings	0	0	0	0	0	0	0	0	0	0
26	MF	(Wales) WAL	Lewis Haldane	60	6	48	6	5	0	1	0	6	0
30	MF	(England) ENG	James Palmer	0	0	0	0	0	0	0	0	0	0
9	FW	(Ghana) GHA	Junior Agogo	3	0	3	0	0	0	0	0	0	0
9	FW	(England) ENG	Rickie Lambert	49	9	39	8	5	0	0	0	5	1
10	FW	(England) ENG	Richard Walker	61	23	49	16	5	4	1	1	6	2
18	FW	(Wales) WAL	Jamal Easter	4	1	3	0	0	0	0	0	1	1
19	FW	(England) ENG	Stuart Nicholson	26	7	22	6	0	0	0	0	4	1
19	FW	(England) ENG	James Walker	5	1	4	1	0	0	0	0	1	0
27	FW	(England) ENG	Sean Rigg	26	2	21	2	2	0	1	0	2	0
29	FW	(Wales) WAL	Lewis Powell	0	0	0	0	0	0	0	0	0	0

=== Goalscorers ===
Fourteen different players scored for the Rovers first team in 2006–07. The team scored 74 goals in all competitions during the course of the season. The top goalscorer was Richard Walker, who finished the season on 23 goals.

Name	League	Cup	Total
Richard Walker	12	11	23
Rickie Lambert	8	2	10
Stuart Nicholson	6	1	7
Craig Disley	4	2	6
Lewis Haldane	6	0	6
Steve Elliott	5	0	5
Sammy Igoe	1	4	5
Andy Sandell	3	0	3
Byron Anthony	0	2	2
Stuart Campbell	1	1	2
Sean Rigg	1	1	2
Jamal Easter	0	1	1
James Hunt	1	0	1
James Walker	1	0	1

=== Discipline ===
During the 2006–07 season five different Rovers players were sent off, and fifteen players received at least one yellow card. In total the team received six red cards and 57 yellow cards.

Name	Red cards	Yellow cards
Aaron Lescott	2	6
Stuart Campbell	1	6
Sammy Igoe	1	5
Craig Hinton	1	4
James Hunt	1	
Lewis Haldane		7
Byron Anthony		5
Richard Walker		5
Chris Carruthers		4
Steve Elliott		4
Stuart Nicholson		3
Andy Sandell		3
Craig Disley		2
Ryan Green		1
Joe Jacobson		1
Samuel Oji		1
Total:	6	57

== Transfers ==
=== In ===
Five players were signed during the 2006–07 season, with a total transfer cost of £200,000, all of which was spent on Rickie Lambert. The remainder of the transfers were free. In addition to this, five players were loaned in over the course of the season, with Stuart Nicholson having two loan spells at the club, and seven scholars from the Bristol Academy of Sport were awarded their first professional contracts at the end of the season.

The players that joined Bristol Rovers during the 2006–07 season, along with their previous club, are listed below.

Date	Player	Previous club	Cost
19 July	(England) Steve Phillips	Bristol City	Free
29 July	(England) Sammy Igoe	Millwall	Free
4 August	(Wales) Byron Anthony	Cardiff City	Free
31 August	(England) Rickie Lambert	Rochdale	£200,000
26 September	(England) James Walker	Charlton Athletic	Loan
27 October	(Wales) Jamal Easter	Cardiff City	Loan
16 November	(England) Stuart Nicholson	West Bromwich Albion	Loan
31 January	(England) Stuart Nicholson	West Bromwich Albion	Loan
15 February	(Wales) Joe Jacobson	Cardiff City	Loan
16 February	(England) Samuel Oji	Birmingham City	Loan
11 May	(Wales) Josh Klein-Davies	Bristol City	Free
16 May	(England) Alex Kite	Youth team	n/a
16 May	(England) Charlie Reece	Youth team	n/a
16 May	(England) Tom Godsell	Youth team	n/a
16 May	(England) Ryan Paddock	Youth team	n/a
16 May	(England) Matt Groves	Youth team	n/a
16 May	(England) Adam Mahdi	Youth team	n/a
16 May	(England) Charlie Clough	Youth team	n/a

=== Out ===
Six players were loaned out during the 2006–07 season, and seven left the club permanently. The club received a transfer fee for one player only, Junior Agogo, but the amount received was not made public.

Listed below are the players that were transferred out, loaned out or released during the season, along with the club that they joined. For players that were transferred or loaned, this is the club that they joined from Rovers. For players that were released by the club, the next team that they joined after leaving Bristol Rovers is listed, even if they did not join that club immediately.

Date	Player	New Club	Cost
30 August	(Ghana) Junior Agogo	Nottingham Forest	Undisclosed
22 September	(England) Mike Green	Mangotsfield United	Loan
25 October	(Wales) Lewis Powell	Mangotsfield United	Loan
26 October	(Scotland) Scott Shearer	Shrewsbury Town	Loan
4 November	(England) Darren Mullings	Clevedon Town	Loan
8 December	(England) Ollie Barnes	Gloucester City	Loan
14 January	(England) James Hunt	Grimsby Town	Loan
1 February	(Republic of Ireland) Robbie Ryan	Welling United	Released
14 May	(England) James Hunt	Grimsby Town	Free
27 May	(Scotland) Scott Shearer	Wycombe Wanderers	Free
30 June	(England) Ollie Barnes	Salisbury City	Released
30 June	(England) Darren Mullings	Torquay United	Released
30 June	(Wales) Lewis Powell	Weston-super-Mare	Released

== Team kit ==
The team kit for the 2006–07 season was produced by Erreà and the main shirt sponsor was Cowlin Construction. The home shirt featured the traditional blue and white quarters, however the shade of blue was lighter than in earlier seasons, and the blue and white were reversed from the previous year. The away kit was dark blue with yellow trim, and the third choice kit was yellow with black trim.

2006–07 home colours	2006–07 away colours	2006–07 third choice colours

== Awards ==
During the course of the 2006–07 season, Bristol Rovers staff won three divisional awards. First team coach Paul Trollope won the League Two Manager of the Month award in April after the team won four of the six games played, and kept five clean sheets. The other two awards both went to Steve Phillips, who won the League Two player of the month award in November and also won the Puma Golden Gloves award for League Two after keeping 28 clean sheets during the season. At the end of the season, Steve Phillips was voted the Bristol Rovers Supporters Club player of the season, and Sean Rigg was voted young player of the year in his debut season, who scored two goals in 26 appearances and missed a portion of the season after suffering a double fracture of the jaw during an FA Cup match in November.

Award	Recipient
League Two player of the month (November)	Steve Phillips
League Two Manager of the Month (April)	Paul Trollope
League Two Puma Golden Glove award	Steve Phillips
Bristol Rovers player of the year	Steve Phillips
Bristol Rovers young player of the year	Sean Rigg

== See also ==
- 2006–07 in English football
