= 2009–10 Bristol Rovers F.C. season =

Bristol Rovers
2009–2010 season
- Manager: Paul Trollope
- Stadium: Memorial Stadium
- League One: 11th
- FA Cup: 1st Round
- League Cup: 2nd Round
- League Trophy: 1st Round
Home colours	Away colours

The 2009–10 season was the third consecutive season in League One since being promoted via the League Two play-offs in 2006–07 played by Bristol Rovers Football Club, a professional football club based in Bristol, England.

== Season summary ==
Having finished 11th in the previous season, a fine start to the 2009–10 season meant Rovers were 3rd place at the start of October, despite the sale of top-scorer Rickie Lambert to Southampton. A run of five successive defeats, however, including 5–1 and 4–0 defeats to Norwich City and Leeds United respectively, saw Rovers drop out of the play-off places. The side finished the season in 11th place after gaining only one point from their last six games.

== Competitions ==
=== League One ===
==== Table ====
Pos	Team	Pld	W	D	L	GF	GA	GD	Pts
9	Brentford	46	14	20	12	55	52	+3	62
10	Walsall	46	16	14	16	60	63	−3	62
11	Bristol Rovers	46	19	5	22	59	70	−11	62
12	Milton Keynes Dons	46	17	9	20	60	68	−8	60
13	Brighton & Hove Albion	46	15	14	17	56	60	−4	59

Source: The Football League
Rules for classification: 1) points; 2) goal difference; 3) number of goals scored.

==== Results ====
League One match details
Date	Opponent	Venue	Result F–A	Scorers	Attendance	Referee	Ref.
8 August 2009	Leyton Orient	H	1–2	Lambert 44'	7,745	Salisbury	
15 August 2009	Stockport County	A	2–0	Kuffour 3', Coles 8'	4,084	Webb	
18 August 2009	Hartlepool United	A	2–1	Lescott 39', Kuffour 45+1'	3,137	Evans	
22 August 2009	Huddersfield Town	H	1–0	Hughes 84' pen.	6,952	Hill	
29 August 2009	Wycombe Wanderers	A	1–2	Lines 26'	5,214	Gibbs	
5 September 2009	Millwall	H	2–0	Hughes 26' pen., Lines 63'	6,038	Moss	
12 September 2009	Oldham Athletic	H	1–0	Kuffour 90'	6,674	Bratt	
19 September 2009	Brentford	A	3–1	Dickson11', 27', Lescott 41'	6,528	Hooper	
26 September 2009	Brighton & Hove Albion	H	1–1	Kuffour 68'	8,098	Graham	
29 September 2009	Southampton	A	3–2	Dickson42', Kuffour 65', Williams 90+6'	19,724	Deadman	
3 October 2009	Norwich City	A	1–5	Hughes 26' pen.	24,117	Hall	
17 October 2009	Southend United	A	1–2	Grant 56' o.g.	6,853	Pawson	
24 October 2009	Yeovil Town	H	1–2	Dickson 46'	7,812	Swarbrick	
27 October 2009	Leeds United	H	0–4		11,448	Woolmer	
31 October 2009	Milton Keynes Dons	A	1–2	Duffy 90+3'	9,711	McDermid	
14 November 2009	Carlisle United	H	3–2	Kuffour 35', Hughes 82', Lines 90+4'	5,862	Hegley	
21 November 2009	Gillingham	H	2–1	Lines 17', Hughes 81' pen.	6,210	Evans	
24 November 2009	Charlton Athletic	A	2–4	Hughes 41' pen., Lines 56'	15,885	Cook	
1 December 2009	Exeter City	H	1–0	Duffy 34'	7,313	Penn	
5 December 2009	Colchester United	A	0–1		4,942	Kettle	
12 December 2009	Swindon Town	H	3–0	Williams 11', Hughes 13',Kuffour 34'	7,613	Walton	
19 December 2009	Tranmere Rovers	A	0–2		4,755	Singh	
28 December 2009	Millwall	A	0–2		10,014	Graham	
19 January 2010	Huddersfield Town	A	0–0		12,624	Booth	
23 January 2010	Hartlepool United	H	2–0	Lines 3', Duffy 66'	5,794	Ward	
30 January 2010	Wycombe Wanderers	H	2–3	Lines 40', 44'	6,688	Shoebridge	
2 February 2010	Leyton Orient	A	0–5		2,931	Miller	
6 February 2010	Walsall	A	0–0		3,886	Quinn	
9 February 2010	Walsall	H	0–1		5,919	Hooper	
15 February 2010	Charlton Athletic	H	2–1	Elliott 14', Heffernan 64'	7,624	Kettle	
20 February 2010	Gillingham	A	0–1		5,302	McDermid	
27 February 2010	Colchester United	H	3–2	Blizzard 16', Kuffour 67', Lines 79'	6,023	Langford	
2 March 2010	Stockport County	H	1–0	Hughes 30'	5,322	Whitestone	
6 March 2010	Swindon Town	A	4–0	Kuffour 25', Heffernan 39', Lines 45', Hughes 61'	10,341	Taylor	
13 March 2010	Tranmere Rovers	H	0–0		6,477	Scott	
17 March 2010	Exeter City	A	0–1		5,269	Hall	
20 March 2010	Yeovil Town	A	3–0	Kuffour 4', 41', Heffernan 37'	5,968	Haywood	
27 March 2010	Southend United	H	4–3	Kuffour 34', Hughes 38' pen., 52', Grant 90+4' o.g.	6,476	Rushton	
2 April 2010	Carlisle United	A	1–3	Heffernan 57'	5,407	Swarbrick	
5 April 2010	Milton Keynes Dons	H	1–0	Kuffour 56'	6,406	Stroud	
10 April 2010	Oldham Athletic	A	1–2	Kuffour 77'	3,769	Halsey	
13 April 2010	Southampton	H	1–5	Hughes 24' pen.	8,607	Crossley	
17 April 2010	Brentford	H	0–0		6,048	Tierney	
24 April 2010	Brighton & Hove Albion	A	1–2	Williams 11'	6,922	Sarginson	
1 May 2010	Norwich City	H	0–3		8,836	Gibbs	
8 May 2010	Leeds United	A	1–2	Duffy 48'	38,234	Salisbury	

=== FA Cup ===
FA Cup match details
Round	Date	Opponent	Venue	Result F–A	Scorers	Attendance	Referee	Ref.
First round	6 November 2009	Southampton	Home	2–3	Duffy 73', Hughes 90' pen.	6,446	Hill	

=== Football League Cup ===
League Cup match details
Round	Date	Opponent	Venue	Result F–A	Scorers	Attendance	Referee	Ref.
First round	11 August 2009	Aldershot Town	Home	2–1	Duffy 37' pen., 58'	3,644	Horwood	
Second round	26 August 2009	Cardiff City	Away	1–3	Elliott 75'	9,767	East	

=== Football League Trophy ===
Football League Trophy match details
Round	Date	Opponent	Venue	Result F–A	Scorers	Attendance	Referee	Ref.
First round	1 September 2009	Hereford United	Away	0–0 (2–4 p)		970	Sheldrake	

== Squad ==
No.	Name	Position	Nationality	Place of Birth	Date of Birth	Note
Goalkeepers
1	Steve Phillips	GK	(England)	Bath	6 May 1978	
13	Mike Green	GK	(England)	Bristol	23 July 1989	
27	Fraser Forster	GK	(England)	Hexham	17 March 1988	On loan from Newcastle United
27	Mikkel Andersen	GK	(Denmark)	Herlev	17 December 1988	On loan from Reading
45	Sam Butler	GK	(England)			
46	Rob Holmes	GK	(England)			
51	Rhys Evans	GK	(England)	Swindon	27 January 1982	
Defenders
2	Carl Regan	RB	(England)	Liverpool	14 January 1980	
5	Danny Coles	CB	(England)	Bristol	30 October 1981	
6	Steve Elliott	CB	(England)	Derby	29 October 1978	
11	Jeff Hughes	DF	(Northern Ireland)	Larne	29 May 1985	
14	David Pipe	DF	(Wales)	Caerphilly	5 November 1983	
15	Byron Anthony	DF	(Wales)	Newport	20 September 1984	
21	Charlie Clough	DF	(England)	Taunton	4 September 1990	
24	Alex Kite	DF	(England)		7 March 1989	
25	James Tyrell	DF	(England)		26 April 1989	
30	Dan Cayford	DF	(England)		31 December 1990	
31	Mark Cooper	DF	(England)		2 January 1992	
32	Aaron Lescott	DF	(England)	Birmingham	2 December 1978	
47	Pat Baldwin	CB	(England)	London	12 November 1982	
48	Daniel Jones	LB	(England)	Rowley Regis	23 December 1986	On loan from Wolverhampton Wanderers
Midfielders
3	Mark Wright	MF	(England)	Wolverhampton	24 February 1982	
4	Chris Lines	MF	(England)	Bristol	20 September 1984	
7	Stuart Campbell	MF	(Scotland)	Corby	9 December 1977	
15	Dominic Blizzard	MF	(England)	High Wycombe	20 September 1984	
19	Sean Rigg	MF	(England)	Bristol	1 October 1988	
20	Charlie Reece	MF	(England)	Birmingham	10 July 1989	
23	Ben Swallow	MF	(Wales)	Barry, Vale of Glamorgan	20 October 1989	
26	Wayne Brown	MF	(England)	Kingston upon Thames	6 August 1988	On loan from Fulham
33	Ollie Clarke	MF	(England)	Bristol	29 June 1992	
36	Jack McKenna	MF	(England)			
Forwards
8	Andy Williams	WG	(England)	Hereford	14 August 1986	
9	Rickie Lambert	CF	(England)	Kirkby	16 February 1982	
9	Chris Dickson	CF	(Ghana)	East Dulwich	28 December 1984	On loan from Charlton Athletic
9	Paul Heffernan	FW	(Republic of Ireland)	Dublin	29 December 1981	On loan from Doncaster Rovers
10	Darryl Duffy	CF	(Scotland)	Glasgow	16 April 1984	
17	Jo Kuffour	FW	(England)	Edmonton	17 November 1981	
18	Ben Hunt	CF	(England)	Southwark	23 January 1990	
26	Lewis Haldane	WG	(England)	Trowbridge	13 March 1985	
26	Lamar Powell	FW	(England)	Bristol	3 September 1993	
28	Eliot Richards	FW	(Wales)	New Tredegar	10 September 1991	
29	Neikell Plummer	FW	(England)		6 June 1991	
