= 2007 Football League Two play-off final =

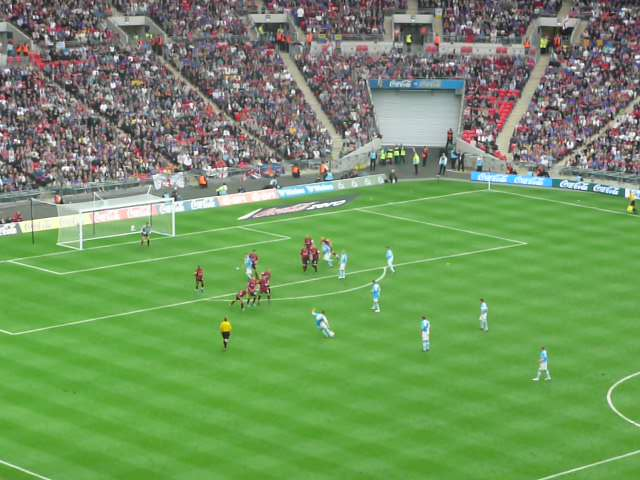
- Rickie Lambert taking a free kick in the final
Bristol Rovers	Shrewsbury Town
3	1
- Date: 26 May 2007
- Venue: Wembley Stadium, London
- Referee: Mike Jones
- Attendance: 61,589

The 2007 Football League Two play-off final was an association football match which was on 26 May 2007 at Wembley Stadium, London, between Bristol Rovers and Shrewsbury Town to determine the fourth and final team to gain promotion from Football League Two to Football League One. The top two teams of the 2006–07 Football League Two season gained automatic promotion to League One, while those placed from third to sixth in the table partook in play-off semi-finals; the winners of these semi-finals competed for the final place for the 2007–08 season in League One.

Bristol Rovers had reached the play-off final in their sixth season back in the fourth tier of English football, having been relegated from the Second Division (equivalent of League One) in the 2000–01 season and Shrewsbury in their third season, after their promotion from the Football Conference in the 2003–04 season. The 2007 final was watched by a crowd of 61,589 people, a record for a fixture played at the fourth tier of English football, and refereed by Mike Jones. Shrewsbury opened the scoring through Stewart Drummond who scored after three minutes from a Neil Ashton free kick. Richard Walker levelled the match midway through the first half when he scored from a Ryan Green cross. Ten minutes before half-time, Walker scored his and Bristol Rovers' second goal after running clear and chipping the ball over Chris Mackenzie, the Shrewsbury Town goalkeeper. Shrewsbury were reduced to ten players when Marc Tierney was sent off near the end of the match for two yellow cards before Sammy Igoe scored into an empty goal to give Bristol Rovers a 3–1 victory and promotion to League One.

Shrewsbury Town ended the next season in eighteenth position, eight points above the relegation zone. Bristol Rovers finished sixteenth in League One, five points above the relegation zone, keeping their place in the third tier.

== Route to the final ==
Football League Two final table, leading positions
Pos	Team	Pld	W	D	L	GF	GA	GD	Pts
1	Walsall	46	25	14	7	66	34	+32	89
2	Hartlepool United	46	26	10	10	65	40	+25	88
3	Swindon Town	46	25	10	11	58	38	+20	85
4	Milton Keynes Dons	46	25	9	12	76	58	+18	84
5	Lincoln City	46	21	11	14	70	59	+11	74
6	Bristol Rovers	46	20	12	14	49	42	+7	72
7	Shrewsbury Town	46	18	17	11	68	46	+22	71

Bristol Rovers finished the regular 2006–07 season in sixth position in Football League Two, the fourth tier of the English football league system, one place and one point ahead of Shrewsbury Town. Both therefore missed out on the three automatic places for promotion to Football League One and instead took part in the play-offs to determine the fourth promoted team. Bristol Rovers finished thirteen points behind Swindon Town (who were promoted in third place), sixteen behind Hartlepool United (who were promoted in second place), and seventeen behind league winners Walsall.

Shrewsbury Town faced Milton Keynes Dons in their play-off semi-final with the first match of the two-legged tie being played at Gay Meadow in Shrewsbury on 14 May 2007. In what was Shrewsbury's final game at the stadium after 97 years, Milton Keynes Dons dominated the majority of the proceedings and although the home side ended strongly, the final score was 0–0. The second leg took place four days later at the National Hockey Stadium in Milton Keynes. After a goalless first half, Shrewsbury Town brought on Andy Cooke as a substitute at half-time and he put his side ahead in the 58th minute after running onto a pass from Danny Hall to score. With sixteen minutes remaining, Keith Andrews equalised after his initial header was saved by Scott Shearer. Cooke scored his and his side's second goal less than two minutes later and the match ended 2–1, with Shrewsbury Town progressing to the final with the same aggregate score.

Bristol Rovers went into the play-offs having won seven and drawn two of their last eleven games. Their opponents for the other play-off semi-final were Lincoln City and the first leg was held at the Memorial Stadium in Bristol on 14 May 2007. Craig Disley opened the scoring for the home side on ten minutes when headed in a cross from Rickie Lambert past Alan Marriott, the Lincoln City goalkeeper. Jeff Hughes equalised for Lincoln City in the 31st minute when he struck his free kick into the top-right corner of the Bristol Rovers goal. Nine minutes into the second half, Richard Walker scored with a volley from Steve Elliott's free kick to give Bristol Rovers the lead which they held to win the match 2–1. The second leg was played three days later at Sincil Bank in Lincoln. Stuart Campbell scored in the third minute for Bristol Rovers with a long-range strike and Lambert volleyed past Marriott to make it 2–0 eight minutes later. Hughes scored from Jamie Forrester's cross midway through the first half to reduce Lincoln City's deficit before Walker made it 3–1 nine minutes before half time. Mark Stallard scored for Lincoln City seven minutes later with a half-volley but a second-half Sammy Igoe goal made it 4–2 to Bristol Rovers in the 82nd minute. Sean Rigg then made it 5–2 in the 90th minute before Hughes scored his second to ensure the match ended 5–3 and Bristol Rovers progressed to the final with a 7–4 aggregate victory.

== Match ==
=== Background ===
This was Bristol Rovers' fourth appearance in the play-offs and their third final, having lost 2–1 on aggregate to Port Vale in the 1989 Football League Third Division play-off final and being defeated 2–1 by Huddersfield Town in the 1995 Football League Second Division play-off final. They had played in the fourth tier of English football after being relegated in the 2000–01 season. Shrewsbury Town were making their first appearance in the English Football League play-offs but had earned promotion from the Football Conference in the 2003–04 season with a penalty shoot-out victory over Aldershot Town in the final. They had played in the fourth tier of English football since then, having last featured in the third tier in the 1996–97 season. The sides had faced one another three times during the regular season: in the league, Bristol Rovers won the match 1–0 at the Memorial Stadium in August 2006 while the game at Gay Meadow the following March ended in a goalless draw. Between those matches, the sides met in the southern section semi-final of the Football League Trophy where Bristol Rovers won 1–0 at Gay Meadow.

Walker was Bristol Rovers' top scorer during the regular season with 19 goals (12 in the league, 4 in the FA Cup, 1 in the League Cup and 2 in the Football League Trophy). The leading scorer for Shrewsbury Town was Michael Symes with a total of 13 goals (9 in the league, 4 in the Football League Trophy) while Ben Davies and Cooke both had a total of 12 goals. The Racing Post considered Bristol Rovers to be favourites to win the final, but their manager Paul Trollope urged caution, noting "We probably are favourites because of the way we have gone into the final, but it is about producing a performance that is good enough to beat Shrewsbury because you don't win anything just by being favourites and turning up".

The referee for the final was Mike Jones from Cheshire. Shrewsbury Town's Davies was unavailable after sustaining an Achilles tendon injury in the semi-final, and goalkeeper Shearer, on loan from Bristol Rovers, was ineligible to play against his own club. Luke Jones was also out injured for Shrewsbury Town, having suffered a locked knee during the warm-up preceding the final. Joe Jacobson's loan period had ended so he had returned to Cardiff City from Bristol Rovers. Both sides adopted a 4–4–2 formation for the final.

=== Summary ===
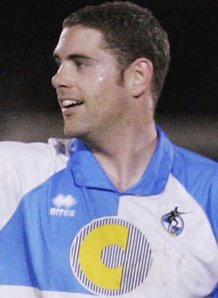
Richard Walker scored twice for Bristol Rovers.

The match kicked off around 3 p.m. on 26 May 2007 at Wembley Stadium in front of a crowd of 61,589. Three minutes into the match, Shrewsbury Town took the lead: Neil Ashton's free-kick from the right was met by Stewart Drummond with a glancing header which sent the ball Bristol Rovers goalkeeper Steve Phillips into the bottom corner of the goal. Ashton had an opportunity to equalise after Derek Asamoah's cross was passed on by Ryan Green but failed to connect with the ball. In the 21st minute, Green took the ball down the right wing before crossing for Walker who struck the ball first time past Chris Mackenzie in the Shrewsbury Town goal. Asamoah then found Cooke with a cross but the Shrewsbury striker was unable to convert the chance to score. With ten minutes of the half remaining, Lewis Haldane passed the ball down the left, and after Richard Hope failed to make the interception, Walker took a controlling touch of the ball and lobbed it over MacKenzie to make it 2–1 before the interval. Late in the second half, Shrewsbury Town's Marc Tierney was sent off after being shown a second yellow card following a late tackle on Campbell. Two minutes into stoppage time, Shrewsbury Town won a corner for which their goalkeeper MacKenzie came up the pitch. Bristol Rovers broke from the corner and Igoe was able to run with the ball before striking it into an empty goal. The match ended 3–1 to Bristol Rovers who were promoted to League One.

=== Details ===
26 May 2007
15:00 BST

Bristol Rovers	3–1	Shrewsbury Town
Walker 21', 35'; Igoe 90+3'	(Report)	Drummond 3'

Wembley, London
Attendance: 61,589
Referee: Mike Jones

Bristol Rovers	Shrewsbury Town

GK	1	Steve Phillips
RB	2	Ryan Green
CB	6	Steve Elliott
CB	15	Byron Anthony
LB	11	Chris Carruthers
RM	4	Sammy Igoe
CM	7	Stuart Campbell (c)	Booked
CM	20	Craig Disley
LM	26	Lewis Haldane		(substituted off) 64'
CF	9	Rickie Lambert
CF	10	Richard Walker	Booked
Substitutes:
GK	31	Mike Green
DF	17	Andy Sandell
DF	32	Aaron Lescott
MF	22	Chris Lines
FW	27	Sean Rigg		(substituted on) 74'
Manager:
Paul Trollope

GK	21	Chris Mackenzie
RB	12	Ben Herd		(substituted off) 84'
CB	5	Richard Hope (c)
CB	8	Kelvin Langmead
LB	23	Marc Tierney	(red card) 89'
RM	10	Derek Asamoah
CM	2	Danny Hall
CM	4	Stewart Drummond
LM	3	Neil Ashton
CF	9	Andy Cooke	Booked	(substituted off) 73'
CF	24	Michael Symes		(substituted off) 80'
Substitutes:
GK	1	Ryan Esson
DF	28	Sagi Burton		(substituted on) 84'
MF	18	Steve Leslie
MF	22	Chris Humphrey		(substituted on) 73'
FW	29	Leo Fortune-West		(substituted on) 80'
Manager:
Gary Peters

== Post-match ==
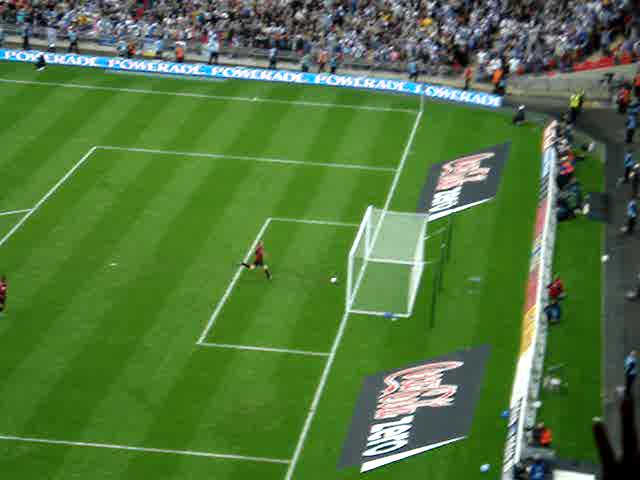
Sammy Igoe rolls in Bristol Rovers' third goal to seal their promotion to League One.

The attendance of 61,589 was a record for the fourth tier play-off final and it was estimated in The Guardian that more than 37,000 of the crowd were Bristol Rovers supporters. Trollope, who had featured in three play-off semi-final defeats as a player, described the victory as "the greatest day of my career." He did, however, note his belief that the two-goal margin of victory somewhat flattered his side. Walker said "I knew it was going to be the biggest game of my life ... We didn't doubt ourselves when they scored, we believed in our ability, we clawed our way back into the game and it was a fantastic thing to win." He went on to express his summer holiday plans: "I'm going to drink for six weeks". Gary Peters, the Shrewsbury Town manager, admitted "Had we had Walker on our side, it might have been different. They had two chances and took them, we had four and didn't put them away ... I think the season's caught up with us. We had four more games than anybody else."

Shrewsbury Town ended the next season in 18th place, eight points above the relegation zone. Bristol Rovers finished 16th in the 2007–08 Football League One, five points above the relegation zone, keeping their place in the third tier.
