= Byron Anthony =

Welsh footballer (born 1984)

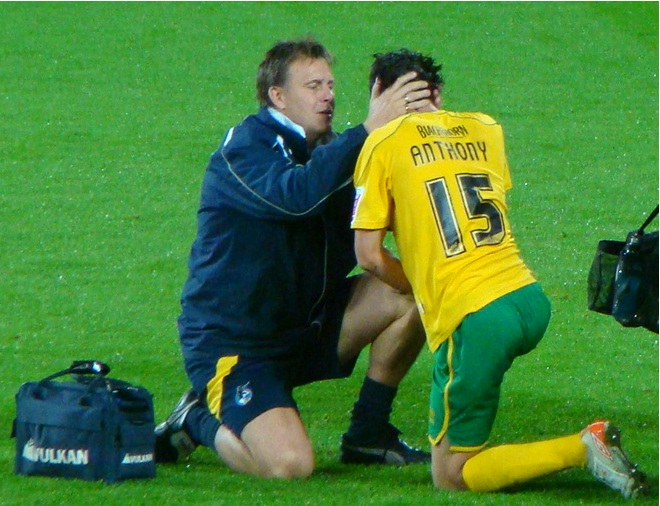
- Anthony being treated by Bristol Rovers physiotherapist Phil Kite in 2009

Personal information
- Full name: Byron Joseph Anthony
- Date of birth: 20 September 1984 (age 42)
- Place of birth: Newport, Wales
- Height: 6 ft 1 in (1.85 m)
- Position: Defender

Team information
- Current team: Bristol Rovers (first-team coach)

Youth career
- 2000–2004: Cardiff City

Senior career*
Years	Team	Apps	(Gls)
2004–2006	Cardiff City	0	(0)
2006	→ Forest Green Rovers (loan)	4	(0)
2006–2012	Bristol Rovers	163	(7)
2012	→ Hereford United (loan)	15	(1)
2012	Hereford United	2	(0)
2012–2014	Newport County	28	(3)
Total		212	(11)

International career
	Wales U19	7	(0)
2004–2005	Wales U21	8	(0)
- * Club domestic league appearances and goals

Byron Joseph Anthony (born 20 September 1984) is a Welsh former professional footballer who is a first-team coach at Bristol Rovers.

Born in Newport, he began his career with Cardiff City, progressing through the club's youth system after signing in 2000. He made his professional debut for the club at the age of 20 in 2004 but only made one further senior appearance before being released following a brief loan spell with Forest Green Rovers. He joined Bristol Rovers, helping the club win promotion to League One after winning the 2007 Football League Two play-off final. He remained in the first team for several years, making over 150 appearances in all competitions for the club before joining Hereford United in 2012 after an initial loan spell.

However, he was released by Hereford after making just two league appearances following his permanent transfer. He instead joined his hometown club Newport County in November 2012 but suffered a serious double break in his ankle during a match in August 2013. Although he made a brief return to playing, the injury would eventually result in his retirement from playing after struggling to regain fitness. Following his retirement, he was appointed as a youth coach at Newport and was eventually promoted to academy manager after a spell as the interim academy manager.

== Early life ==
Growing up in Newport, Wales, Anthony attended St Joseph's Roman Catholic High School. As well as playing football, Anthony was a keen rugby player and was part of a Newport under-16 side that toured France.Newport County and Barry Town.

== Club career ==
=== Cardiff City ===
Having played for local amateur club Cromwell, Anthony was invited for a trial with his hometown club Newport County at the age of fifteen but was forced to cancel. He was later invited to a trial with Cardiff City, joining the club in 2000. He was part of the club's youth side that won the 2002 Welsh Youth Cup, defeating Llanelli 3–2 in the final, and captained the side the following season. He was called up to the Wales U19 squad for the Milk Cup in 2003 and captained the side in six of his seven appearances. He was also capped eight times by Wales at Under-21 level.

In May 2004, Anthony signed his first professional contract at the club. After captaining the club's reserve side, Anthony was called into the senior team for several pre-season friendlies at the start of the 2004–05 season, featuring in a match against Chester City. After being an unused substitute for a league match against Stoke City, on 21 September 2004, Anthony made his professional debut, being named in the starting line-up in a 4–1 victory over Milton Keynes Dons in the Football League Cup after Rhys Weston pulled out due to injury. He scored Cardiff's fourth goal of the match, heading in from a Paul Parry corner. Following this, Anthony signed a contract with the club in late October 2004.

In February 2006, Anthony joined Football Conference side Forest Green Rovers on a one-month emergency loan deal, He made his debut in a 3–2 defeat to Morecambe. He made three further league appearances for the club before returning to Cardiff at the end of his loan spell. At the end of the 2005–06 season, Anthony was released by Cardiff.

=== Bristol Rovers ===
After being released by Cardiff, he joined Bristol Rovers on 1 July 2006, linking up with former Cardiff manager Lennie Lawrence. After being an unused substitute for the first three matches, Anthony made his Rovers debut in a 1–0 victory over Grimsby Town in a League Two match on 12 August 2006. On 17 October 2006, he scored his first goal for Bristol Rovers against Torquay United in the first round of Football League Trophy. Despite being restricted to twenty-three appearances in his first season, due to a knee injury, Anthony signed a contract extension with Rovers, keeping him at the club until 2009. Forming a partnership with the club's established defensive players Craig Hinton and Steve Elliott, Anthony was part of a Rovers defence that conceded fewer goals at home than any other League Two side during the 2006–07 season. Finishing in sixth place, the team won promotion after defeating Shrewsbury Town in the 2007 Football League Two play-off final.

Anthony remained a regular in the first team following the club's promotion and scored his first and only goal of the 2007–08 season on 1 September 2007, at home in 2–2 draw with Nottingham Forest. However, he suffered a setback at the start of Rovers' 2007–08 campaign in League One in October when he sustained a broken metatarsal in the club's match against AFC Bournemouth in the Football League Trophy and was ruled out for twelve weeks. However, he did not make his return from injury until 12 March 2008, in a 1–1 draw against Northampton Town. He made a total of 23 appearances in all competitions during the season.

In the 2008–09 season, Anthony remained ever present until he received the first red card of his professional career, in a 3–1 home defeat against Walsall. After serving a suspension, Anthony returned to the first team until he was once again sent-off in the first round of the FA Cup, during a 1–0 loss against Bournemouth. After serving his second suspension of the season, he fell out of favour before making a goalscoring return to the starting line-up, in a 2–0 home victory against Oldham Athletic on 24 February 2009. Anthony made thirty appearances for the club in the 2008–09 season.

On 13 March 2010, in a match against Tranmere Rovers, Anthony was involved in a challenge with Bas Savage, resulting in Anthony being stretchered off just before half-time. Following an X-ray, it was later confirmed that Anthony had not suffered any serious injury. He soon returned to the first team and, despite serving a two match suspension, Anthony made 40 appearances for Rovers in the 2009–10 season.

Anthony scored his first goal of the 2010–11 season with a late winner against local rivals Yeovil Town, in a 2–1 victory on 27 August 2010. Two months later on 23 October 2010, Anthony scored his second goal of this season with another late goal, an equaliser in a 2–2 draw with Hartlepool United, in the 90th minute. Anthony suffered an ankle injury in late February and made his first team return on 25 March 2011 against Peterborough United, setting up a goal for Jo Kuffour but also scoring an own goal, in a 2–2 draw. Anthony finished the season with 42 appearances for the club in all competitions during the 2010–11 season, as Rovers suffered relegation to League Two after finishing in 22nd position.

In the 2011–12 season, Anthony scored in his second appearance during a 2–1 defeat to local rivals Torquay United. Having initially retained his place in the side, scoring his second goal of the season in the 6–1 rout against AFC Totton, he was dropped by new manager Mark McGhee who had been appointed as Paul Buckle's permanent replacement in January 2012. He made no further appearances for the club under McGhee, being sent out on loan to Hereford United. Even after his return, Anthony's future at Bristol Rovers looked slim, as he was not offered a new contract by the club. This was later confirmed by the club on 18 May 2012, as Anthony was among seven players to be released by the club, ending his six-year association with Bristol Rovers. Following his release, Anthony publicly criticised McGhee, stating "He said he would give everyone an opportunity but he didn't give me the chance to show what I could do."

=== Hereford United ===
On 17 February 2012, Anthony joined fellow Football League Two side Hereford United on a month-long loan deal. He made his debut for Hereford in a 2–1 loss against Swindon Town the next day, and scored his first goal for the club seven days later, in a 2–2 draw against Bradford City at Valley Parade. His loan spell with Hereford was later extended until the end of the season., finishing the season with fifteen appearances for the club as they suffered relegation from the Football League.

On 13 September 2012, Anthony returned to Hereford, signing non-contract terms. On 15 September 2012, he made his début for Hereford United in a match against Dartford, which saw Hereford lose 4–0. However, in his next game against Cambridge United, Anthony received a red card during a 4–2 victory. The dismissal resulted in a three-match suspension and four days after the game, on 26 September 2012, he was released from his contract with the club in order for a loan replacement to be signed.

=== Newport County ===
Following his release, Anthony joined his home town club Newport County on trial before signing a permanent deal on 16 November 2012. He made his debut for Newport on 22 September 2012, against Forest Green Rovers.

Anthony scored his first goal for the club on 9 February 2013, in a 2–2 draw at home with Tamworth. In the 2012–13 season he was part of the Newport team that finished third in the league, reaching the Conference National playoffs. They went on to win the playoff final against Wrexham at Wembley Stadium 2–0 to return to the Football League after a 25-year absence with promotion to Football League Two. Following the end of the season, Anthony was offered a new contract by the club, and signed a contract a few days later.

On 6 August 2013, Anthony suffered a double ankle break during Newport's 3–1 Football League Cup victory at Brighton & Hove Albion after a tackle by Iñigo Calderón. Calderón received a straight red card for the foul but Newport manager Justin Edinburgh stated his belief that no malice was involved and dedicated the club's victory to Anthony.

After five months on the sidelines, Anthony made his return to training in late January. Weeks later, Anthony played his first match in seven months, when he appeared for the club's reserve team against Bristol Rovers. Anthony returned to the team and played a number of games towards the end of the 2013–14 season but Edinburgh later admitted that there were still concerns over his recovery after he developed back problems, commenting "I think there's always a doubt in terms of the severity of the injury."

His contract renewal for the 2014–15 season was delayed whilst he underwent fitness tests which were ultimately unsuccessful. Anthony announced his retirement from playing on 1 December 2014, revealing that he had been playing in pain following his return and stating "I've tried to get back to full fitness but I was never quite there."

== Coaching career ==
Upon announcing his retirement from playing, Anthony took up a role coaching the Newport County under 16's and under 18's. In March 2016, Newport announced that academy manager Grant Kalahar would leave his role at the end of the 2015–16 season with Anthony being appointed interim academy manager until the end of the 2015–16 season. After two months in the role, Newport appointed Anthony as academy manager on a full-time basis. Anthony resigned from his position at Newport in November 2018.

Anthony joined former club Bristol Rovers in September 2020 as an academy coach having recently passed his UEFA Pro License and would be working alongside the Under-14s team. In February 2021, Anthony left Rovers to join Swansea City in a full-time role with the Under-18s squad. Anthony left his role with Swansea City in late October 2021.

In November 2021, Anthony returned to Bristol Rovers in the role of Academy Head of Coaching. Anthony was promoted to the role of Academy Manager in July 2022. In December 2025, Anthony was promoted to assist the first-team following the appointment of Steve Evans, remaining in the role for the remainder of the season having impressed the new manager. He was offered a permanent first-team coaching role at the end of the 2025–26 season. On 19 May 2026, the club confirmed his permanent appointment as first-team coach.

== Career statistics ==
Appearances and goals by club, season and competition
Club	Season	League			FA Cup		League Cup		Other		Total	
Club	Season	Division	Apps	Goals	Apps	Goals	Apps	Goals	Apps	Goals	Apps	Goals
Cardiff City	2004–05	Championship	0	0	0	0	2	1	0	0	2	1
Cardiff City	2005–06	Championship	0	0	0	0	0	0	0	0	0	0
Cardiff City	Total		0	0	0	0	2	1	0	0	2	1
Forest Green Rovers (loan)	2005–06	Conference	4	0	0	0	0	0	0	0	4	0
Bristol Rovers	2006–07	League Two	23	0	3	1	1	0	6 (Note: Appearances in League Two play-offs and Football League Trophy)	1	33	2
Bristol Rovers	2007–08	League One	20	1	0	0	2	0	1 (Note: Appearances in Football League Trophy)	0	23	1
Bristol Rovers	2008–09	League One	31	2	1	0	1	0	1	0	34	2
Bristol Rovers	2009–10	League One	37	0	0	0	2	0	0	0	40	0
Bristol Rovers	2010–11	League One	37	3	1	0	1	0	3	0	42	3
Bristol Rovers	2011–12	League Two	17	1	1	1	2	0	1	0	21	2
Bristol Rovers	Total		163	7	6	2	9	0	12	1	190	10
Hereford United (loan)	2011–12	League Two	15	1	0	0	0	0	0	0	15	1
Hereford United	2012–13	Conference	2	0	0	0	0	0	0	0	2	0
Newport County	2012–13	Conference	21	3	0	0	0	0	3 (Note: Appearances in Football Conference play-offs)	0	24	3
Newport County	2013–14	League Two	7	0	0	0	1	0	0	0	8	0
Newport County	Total		28	3	0	0	1	0	3	0	32	3
Career total			212	11	6	2	12	0	15	1	245	14

== Honours ==
Bristol Rovers

- Football League Two play-offs: 2007
- Football League Trophy runner-up: 2006–07

Newport County

- Football Conference play-offs: 2013
