= Lewis Haldane =

Welsh footballer

Personal information
- Full name: Lewis Oliver Haldane
- Date of birth: 13 March 1985 (age 41)
- Place of birth: Trowbridge, England
- Height: 6 ft 0 in (1.83 m)
- Position: Winger

Youth career
- Southampton
- Bristol Rovers
- Trowbridge Town

Senior career*
Years	Team	Apps	(Gls)
2002–2010	Bristol Rovers	147	(15)
2003	→ Weston-super-Mare (loan)		
2005	→ Forest Green Rovers (loan)	6	(0)
2005	→ Forest Green Rovers (loan)	7	(0)
2008–2009	→ Oxford United (loan)	43	(3)
2009	→ Port Vale (loan)	14	(0)
2009–2010	→ Port Vale (loan)	3	(0)
2010–2012	Port Vale	46	(3)
2013–2014	Yate Town	56	(38)
2014–2016	Frome Town	40	(9)
2016	Yate Town	0	(0)
Total		362	(68)

International career
2006	Wales U21	1	(0)
- * Club domestic league appearances and goals

Lewis Oliver Haldane (born 13 March 1985) is a Welsh former under-21 international footballer who scored 75 goals in 414 league and cup games in a 14-year career.

A winger, he was a youth player at Southampton and Trowbridge Town before he turned professional at Bristol Rovers in 2002. Loaned out to non-League Weston-super-Mare, he broke through into the Rovers first-team in 2003–04. He was loaned out to Conference club Forest Green Rovers for a part of the 2004–05 and 2005–06 campaigns. He stormed into the Bristol Rovers first-team picture with sixty appearances in 2006–07. At the end of the season, he helped the club to win promotion into League One through the play-offs. He also played in the club's defeat in the Football League Trophy final. A first-team regular in 2007–08, he lost his place and spent the 2008–09 season on loan at Conference side Oxford United.

He joined Port Vale on loan at the start of the 2009–10 season before joining the club permanently in January 2010. He recovered from a serious infection following an insect bite sustained at the start of the 2010–11 season, only to be struck down with a broken leg at the start of the 2011–12 campaign. The injury eventually forced him to retire from professional football in October 2012. However, he later returned to play semi-professionally with Yate Town, before signing for Frome Town in November 2014. He retired following a brief return to Yate Town in January 2016.

== Club career ==
=== Bristol Rovers ===
Haldane was a product of the Southampton youth academy. He moved on to Bristol Rovers though for the 2002–03 season, and had a brief spell on 'work experience' at Southern League side Weston-super-Mare. His professional debut at the Memorial Stadium came on 27 September 2003 as he replaced Junior Agogo as an 85th-minute substitute; despite only playing for a few minutes he won a penalty in a 2–0 win over Cheltenham Town. His first goal came seven days later at Belle Vue, the sole consolation of a 5–1 drubbing by Doncaster Rovers; he scored minutes after coming onto the pitch. His first start came a week later, at Darlington, where he scored the opener of a 4–0 victory. He made it three in three on 14 October, as Rovers crashed out of the Football League Trophy with a 2–1 defeat by Southend United at Roots Hall. He finished the 2003–04 season with 29 appearances, scoring six goals and picking up seven yellow cards. At the end of the season, he was one of the few players retained, as eleven were let go. He went on to sign a new three-year deal in November 2004.

The teenager made 16 appearances in 2004–05, all but one as a substitute, picking up one goal against Leyton Orient in the League Trophy. In April 2005 he joined Conference club Forest Green Rovers on loan. He played six games before returning to Bristol, following the dismissal of manager Ian Atkins. He began the 2005–06 season on loan at Forest Green, putting in seven appearances before heading back to Rovers in September. He played 32 games for the League Two side, scoring three goals, two of them at the end-of-season clash with Macclesfield Town. During the season, he was utilized on the right of midfield rather than his usual role as a striker.

He played a remarkable sixty competitive games in 2006–07. The highlights of the season included playing in the Football League Trophy final at the Millennium Stadium and playing in the play–off final at Wembley Stadium. In the League Trophy final, the "Gas" lost 3–2 to Doncaster Rovers, a game in which Haldane was man of the match, but at the play-off final at Wembley they defeated Shrewsbury Town 3–1. Haldane started both games but finished neither. At the end of the season, he put pen to paper on a three-year contract.

He made 38 appearances in 2007–08, as the "Pirates" adapted to life playing at a higher level. His only goal of the campaign was a late winning header over Millwall on 17 November. At the reverse fixture he set up Craig Disley's winning goal. He joined Oxford United on a season-long loan in July 2008, following the arrival of Jeff Hughes at Rovers. He played 46 games for the Conference side, but remained on the transfer list at the Memorial Stadium upon his return.

"It wasn't an easy decision to drop down to the Conference but once I had met the manager and seen the set-up I was convinced."

— Haldane took some convincing to drop down two tiers to play for Oxford.

=== Port Vale ===
In August 2009, he joined Port Vale for a trial period. This came despite talk of a loan move to Newport County. He started a loan spell at Vale Park on 1 September, hopeful of later earning a permanent deal with the club. The one-month loan was extended by another month to keep him in Vale colours for October, before the deal was extended once again in November. Spending the maximum allowed loan time at Vale Park (93 days), he scored once in a total of twenty appearances. He remained in training with the club, hopeful of a short-term contract in January 2010.

Lewis has got the ingredient that can hurt teams at this level, which is real pace. I still think he can get better and I still think he needs to be a little bit more selfish, but he's always a threat."

— Vale boss Micky Adams speaking in November 2009.

Due to sign permanently for the "Vale", he was instead only able to re-join the club on loan on 31 December 2009, having failed to gain a release from Rovers. That release was eventually secured however. Haldane signed for Vale on 27 January 2010, just days before the transfer window closed. He was sent off in his first game as a fully signed Vale player, to his great disappointment. He was offered a new contract by the club at the end of the season, and quickly signed the two-year deal.

In the 2010–11 pre-season, Haldane was rushed into hospital after being bitten by a blandford fly during a training session. The unusual illness kept him bed stricken, and cost him his place in the team's trip to Ireland, giving Gary Roberts a chance to earn a contract. He spent two weeks in hospital. He had to wait until November before he had returned to match fitness, and even longer before returning to full fitness. Following his recovery he managed to finish the season with 27 appearances to his name.

Haldane won his first start of the 2011–12 campaign in a League Trophy clash with Tranmere Rovers; however, he landed awkwardly after an aerial challenge, the result of which was a double leg break and another lengthy spell on the sidelines. By January 2012 the bone had completely healed, however, manager Micky Adams confirmed that another operation looked likely. Three months later he took to the field again in a reserve team clash with Burton Albion. He was allowed to prove his fitness when he was offered a new six-month contract in May 2012. However, two months later he went under the knife again to remove scar tissue from his left ankle. The leg injury proved too severe, and his retirement was officially announced on 7 October.

"He's very much part of the Port Vale family and we look after our own. That's the right way to be at a football club and certainly the way I want to manage. Lewis is a great kid and we'll miss him. We'll try our best as a club to help him in whatever the next phase of his life is. He'll move on to the next chapter in his life and there's more to life than football, or so they say. He'll have enjoyed his career to a certain degree and he'll be very frustrated to have it curtailed at such a young age. But he's got a good family behind him and he'll decide over the next couple of months what he wants to do with his life. We wish him well."

— Following Haldane's retirement, manager Micky Adams justified his decision to hand him a six-month contract earlier in the year and wished Haldane well in the future.

=== Non-League ===
Haldane began the 2013–14 season with Southern League side Yate Town. He helped the "Bluebells" to a ninth place in Division One South & West in 2013–14. He was a prolific goalscorer, scoring two consecutive hat-tricks in February. He rejected an approach from Paulton Rovers in August 2014, and three months later instead joined Frome Town. The "Robins" finished one place above the Southern League Premier Division relegation zone in 2014–15. He re-signed with Yate Town in January 2016. Yate finished 16th in Division One South & West in 2015–16, but Haldane was unable to feature due to work commitments.

== International career ==
Although Haldane was born in Trowbridge, Wiltshire, due to parentage, he had Welsh eligibility and was called up to the under-21 squad for the first time in August 2006. His only under-21 cap came in a goalless draw with Turkey on 2 September 2006.

In February 2009, Haldane was selected to represent England C for the fixture against Malta under-21s. However, he was forced to withdraw because he had previously represented Wales at under-21 level.

== Style of play ==
Haldane was a pacey winger, adept at working either flank. In January 2005, Bristol Rovers assistant coach Kevan Broadhurst said that "He gets into good areas but he needs to improve on the physical and finishing side of his game. He doesn't quite have the end product and he's too willing to go down under a tackle rather than fight for the ball."

"Lewis is a confidence player, the type who needs people to have belief in him... quick, but he's not the finished article. His final ball lets him down at times but when he is in full flow he can be quite exciting."

— Port Vale manager Micky Adams describes his midfielder in May 2010.

== Personal life ==
Already boasting a considerable amount of body art, Haldane had his girlfriend's name (Michelle) tattooed onto his torso in February 2010 as a Valentine's Day gesture. After retiring as a professional footballer in October 2012 he began working for a lorry components company in Bristol.

== Career statistics ==
Appearances and goals by club, season and competition
Club	Season	League			FA Cup		League Cup		Other		Total	
Club	Season	Division	Apps	Goals	Apps	Goals	Apps	Goals	Apps	Goals	Apps	Goals
Bristol Rovers	2002–03	Third Division	0	0	0	0	0	0	0	0	0	0
Bristol Rovers	2003–04	Third Division	27	5	1	0	0	0	1 (Note: Appearance(s) in the Football League Trophy.)	1	29	6
Bristol Rovers	2004–05	League Two	13	0	2	0	0	0	2	1	17	1
Bristol Rovers	2005–06	League Two	30	3	1	0	0	0	1	0	32	3
Bristol Rovers	2006–07	League Two	45	6	5	0	1	0	9 (Note: 6 appearances in the Football League Trophy and 3 appearances in the play-offs.)	0	60	6
Bristol Rovers	2007–08	League One	32	1	3	0	2	0	1	0	38	1
Bristol Rovers	2008–09	League One	0	0	0	0	0	0	0	0	0	0
Bristol Rovers	2009–10	League One	0	0	0	0	0	0	0	0	0	0
Bristol Rovers	Total		147	15	12	0	3	0	14	2	176	17
Forest Green Rovers (loan)	2004–05	Conference National	6	0	—		—		—		6	0
Forest Green Rovers (loan)	2005–06	Conference National	7	0	0	0	—		0	0	7	0
Forest Green Rovers (loan)	Total		13	0	0	0	0	0	0	0	13	0
Oxford United (loan)	2008–09	Conference Premier	43	3	3	0	0	0	0	0	46	3
Port Vale	2009–10	League Two	37	3	3	0	1	0	2	1	43	4
Port Vale	2010–11	League Two	23	0	4	0	0	0	0	0	27	0
Port Vale	2011–12	League Two	3	0	0	0	1	0	1	0	5	0
Port Vale	2012–13	League Two	0	0	0	0	0	0	0	0	0	0
Port Vale	Total		63	3	7	0	2	0	3	1	75	4
Yate Town	2013–14	Southern League; Division One South & West	44	32			—				44	32
Yate Town	2014–15	Southern League; Division One South & West	12	6	2	2	—		2 (Note: 1 appearance and 1 goal in the Southern League Cup, 1 appearance in the FA Trophy.)	1	16	9
Yate Town	Total		56	38	2	2	0	0	2	1	60	41
Frome Town	2014–15	Southern League; Premier Division	29	8	0	0	—		2 (Note: 1 appearance and 1 goal in the Somerset Premier Cup, 1 appearance in the Southern League Cup.)	1	31	9
Frome Town	2015–16	Southern League; Premier Division	11	1	1	0	—		1 (Note: Appearance in the Southern League Cup.)	0	13	1
Frome Town	Total		40	9	1	0	0	0	3	1	44	10
Yate Town	2015–16	Southern League; Division One South & West	0	0	0	0	—		0	0	0	0
Career total (Note: Statistics for Weston-super-Mare not recorded.)			362	68	25	2	5	0	22	5	414	75

== Honours ==
Bristol Rovers

- Football League Two play-offs: 2007
- Football League Trophy runner-up: 2006–07
