= Nick Higgs =

British football executive

Nicholas Higgs
- Occupation: businessman

Nicholas Higgs is a former businessman and previous chairman of Bristol Rovers Football Club, and a former chief executive of Cowlin Construction, a company now owned by Balfour Beatty.

Higgs stepped down as chief executive of Cowlin following its sale for £52 million in cash to Balfour Beatty in August 2007, at which point he was vice-chairman of Bristol Rovers. He became chairman of the football club twelve months later, in August 2008, when he replaced Ron Craig.

On 19 February 2016, during a press conference to announce the takeover of Bristol Rovers by the Jordanian Al-Qadi family, Higgs announced that he would be stepping down as chairman of the club with immediate effect with his majority shareholding included in the sale. Former Swansea Chairman Steve Hamer was appointed in his place.

Sporting positions
Preceded by Ron Craig	Bristol Rovers F.C. chairman August 2008–19 February 2016	Succeeded by Steve Hamer
