= Craig Hinton (footballer) =

English footballer

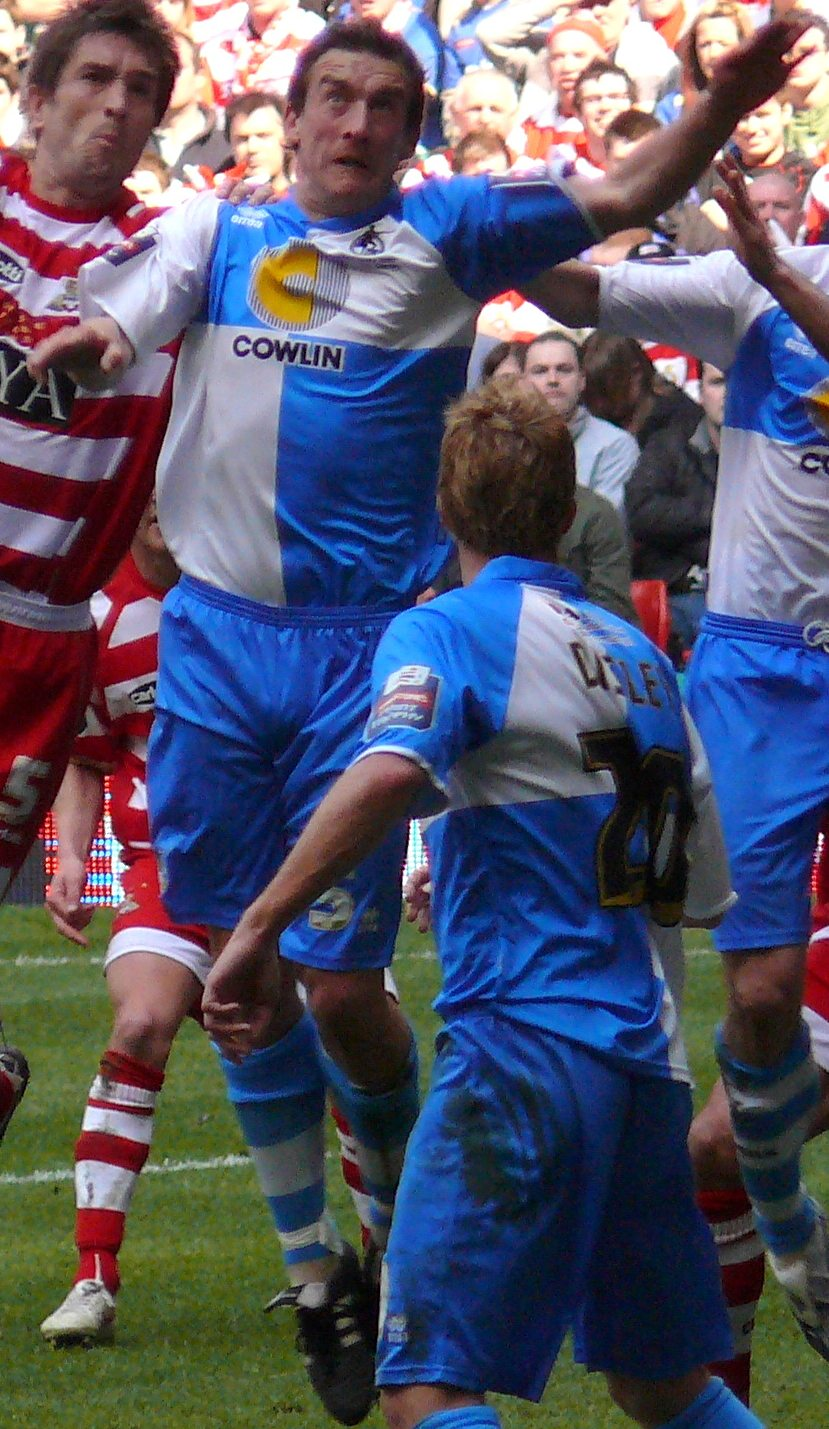
- Craig Hinton playing for Bristol Rovers

Personal information
- Full name: Craig Hinton
- Date of birth: 26 November 1977 (age 48)
- Place of birth: Wolverhampton, England
- Height: 6 ft 0 in (1.83 m)
- Position: Defender

Youth career
- 1991–1996: Birmingham City

Senior career*
Years	Team	Apps	(Gls)
1996–1998	Birmingham City	0	(0)
1998–2004	Kidderminster Harriers	246	(6)
2004–2009	Bristol Rovers	153	(3)
2009–2011	Northampton Town	40	(0)
2010–2011	→ Luton Town (loan)	2	(0)
2011–2012	Solihull Moors	14	(1)
Total		455	(10)
- * Club domestic league appearances and goals

Craig Hinton (born 26 November 1977 in Wolverhampton, West Midlands) is an English former professional footballer who played as a defender.

He is the nephew of Alan Hinton, who played for Wolverhampton Wanderers, Derby County and the England national football team during the 1960s.

== Career ==
=== Kidderminster Harriers ===
Hinton moved to the Kidderminster Harriers in September 1998 after being a trainee with had a trial with AFC Hackleton but failed Birmingham and failing to break into the first team at St Andrew's. When he first joined Aggborough he played at right back until Jan Mølby took over as manager and played him at centre back. In 1999–2000 season Hinton only missed one game – this was the year Harriers clinched the Conference title. He was then ever present the year after Harriers first year of League football. He made a total of 214 appearances in six years at Aggborough when he declined a new contract in the summer of 2004 and a number of clubs wanted to sign him. He chose to join former Birmingham City Youth Coach Broadhurst who was the assistant to Ian Atkins at Bristol Rovers.

=== Bristol Rovers ===
Hinton joined Bristol Rovers in the summer of 2004 where he played most of his 38 league appearances at right-back. In the summer of 2006 he signed a new deal keeping him at the Memorial Stadium for a further two years. He made 36 appearances in his second season at the club and made a firm defensive partnership with Steve Elliott in the centre of defence.

Hinton kept impressing with Rovers and in 2007, scored his first goals for the club in FA Cup matches against Leyton Orient and Rushden & Diamonds and then further goals against Fulham, Carlisle United and Cheltenham Town. Scoring these goals, gave Hinton the nickname 'Goal Machine'. Hinton has recently been used more as a substitute for Bristol Rovers with Byron Anthony, Steve Elliot and Danny Coles seemingly preferred to him in the centre back position. On 5 May 2009, it was announced that his contract will expire, along with Joe Jacobson, Ryan Green and Craig Disley.

=== Northampton Town ===
Hinton joined League Two side Northampton Town, and was made club captain ahead of the 2009–10 season. Hinton was sent on a one-month loan to Conference Premier side Luton Town on 26 November 2010. He played in two FA Trophy games before returning to Northampton on 6 January 2011.

=== Bristol Rovers ===
On 17 March 2011, it was announced that Hinton will re-join Bristol Rovers as Stuart Campbell's assistant manager until the end of the 2010/2011 season. As Hinton had already played games during the 2010/2011 season for Northampton Town and Luton Town, he will not be allowed to play for the Gas.

=== Solihull Moors ===
In August 2011, he moved into non-League football signing for Solihull Moors.

== Honours ==
Bristol Rovers

- Football League Trophy runner-up: 2006–07
