= Josh Klein-Davies =

English footballer (born 1989)

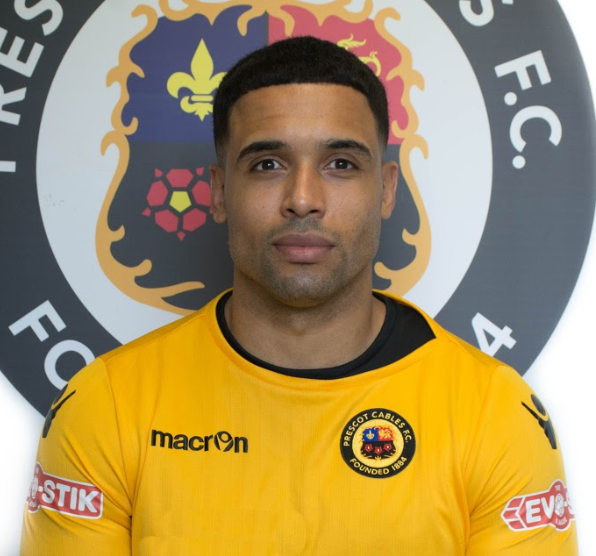
- Klein-Davies in Prescot Cables Kit in 2018

Personal information
- Full name: Joshua David Klein-Davies
- Date of birth: 6 July 1989 (age 37)
- Place of birth: Bristol, England
- Height: 6 ft 2 in (1.88 m)
- Position: Striker

Youth career
- Cadbury Heath
- Bristol City

Senior career*
Years	Team	Apps	(Gls)
2007–2009	Bristol Rovers	10	(1)
2007	→ Yate Town (loan)		
2008	→ Luton Town (loan)	1	(0)
2008	→ Newport County (loan)		
2009	→ Lewes (loan)	9	(0)
2009	→ Bath City (loan)		
2009	Weston-super-Mare	1	(0)
2009	Weymouth	5	(1)
2009–2010	Weston-super-Mare	9	(2)
2010	Brislington	7	(2)
2010	Weston-super-Mare	2	(0)
2010–2011	Almondsbury Town		
2011	→ Hastings United (loan)	1	(0)
2010–2011	Hanham Sunday		
2011	Brislington		
2011	Clevedon Town	10	(1)
2011–2012	Shepton Mallet		
2012–2013	Mangotsfield United	17	(2)
2013	→ Odd Down (loan)		
2013–2014	Paulton Rovers	41	(16)
2014	Frome Town	3	(0)
2014	→ Bishop Sutton (dual registration)		
2015	Shortwood United	18	(9)
2015	Taunton Town	13	(3)
2015–2016	Bridgwater Town		
2017–2019	Prescot Cables	67	(27)
2019	Widnes		
2019	Skelmersdale United		
2020–2022	Prescot Cables	2	(0)
2022–2023	Sandbach United	23	(8)

International career^{‡}
2005–2006	Wales U17	6	(1)
2006–2008	Wales U19	5	(0)
- * Club domestic league appearances and goals as of 09:49, 8 June 2011 (UTC) ‡ National team caps and goals as of 13:24, 8 November 2008 (UTC)

Joshua David Klein-Davies (born 6 July 1989) is a footballer who plays as a striker.

== Career ==
Born in Bristol, Klein-Davies grew up in the St Pauls area of the city. He played in the Avon Youth League for Cadbury Heath from a young age and started out at Stoke Lane A.F.C. He began his career as an academy player at Bristol City and was capped by Wales at Under-17 and Under-19 levels. He signed for Bristol Rovers in May 2007 after being released by Bristol City.

In November 2007, Klein-Davies joined Yate Town on a one-month loan deal to enable him to gain first-team experience. This loan was extended for a second month, however the deal was cut short when Bristol Rovers recalled him to the Memorial Stadium on 28 December. He scored a total of five goals in eight league appearances for Yate.

Klein-Davies made his Football League debut on 29 December 2007, when he came on as a substitute for Andy Williams in a home match against Carlisle United. He scored his first senior goal against Huddersfield Town with a header from close range.

He joined Luton Town on loan shortly before the start of the 2008–09 season, but returned to Rovers early after manager Mick Harford felt he "wasn't what he was looking for". In November 2008 Klein-Davies was loaned out again, this time to Newport County, and following the expiry of this deal he joined Lewes and then Bath City, again on loan.

He was released by Rovers late in April 2009, having not made an appearance for the club since the final day of the 2007–08 season.

In July 2009 he had an unsuccessful trial with Weymouth and he joined Weston-super-Mare in August. He played one game for them before turning out for Weymouth, making five appearances and scoring one goal before returning to Weston in December. He finished the 2009–10 season with nine appearances and two goals for Weston after returning and in July 2010 he trained with League Two team Cheltenham Town.

He spent the summer of 2010 in pre season training with Conference National side Forest Green Rovers and featured in a number of pre season and reserve team matches.

However, he moved to Western Football League side Brislington and in October 2010 re-signed for former club, Weston-super-Mare, for a third time. He signed on for Southern League South & West outfit Almondsbury Town shortly after. The spell was interfered by a stint at Hastings United during winter 2011. On 9 April 2011, Klein-Davies suffered a dislocated shoulder in a game for Almondsbury against local rivals Mangotsfield United, and the same month it was announced that Almondsbury Town would resign from the Southern League at the end of the season due to ground problems. He appeared for Brislington again at the very end of the season, and also featured for Hanham Sunday in the Sunday League Cup during 2010–11.

Klein-Davies started the 2011–12 season with Clevedon Town, and later moved on to Western Football League side Shepton Mallet.

A week ahead of the 2012–13 season he signed for Mangotsfield United, and in February 2013 they sent him out on loan to Odd Down.

After a trial for Paulton Rovers at the start of the 2013–14 season, he helped them win promotion from the Southern Football League Division One South & West, before joining Frome Town in October 2014. After a handful of games for The Robins as well as Bishop Sutton on dual registration, he linked up with Shortwood United of the Southern League in January 2015. He scored on his debut for Shortwood in a 2–2 draw against Swindon Supermarine.

At the start of the 2015–16 season he signed for Taunton Town, also scoring in that debut, but was released in mid-November and joined divisional rivals Bridgwater Town shortly after.

Having spent time with Rhyl during the previous season, he made his debut for Prescot Cables on 19 September 2017, but had to wait until 17 October to be handed his first start for the Merseyside side. He joined Widnes ahead of the 2019–20 season. In October 2019 he was released along with three other players. He then joined Skelmersdale United, on dual registration terms with Prescot Cables according to Ormskirk Advertiser, making his debut on 1 December 2019. He made two appearances for Prescot.

In the summer of 2022 Joshua Klein-Davies joined Sandbach United FC as he recovered from the injury that plagued him the season before.
