= Ron Craig =

English football executive

Ron Craig (died 30 November 2009) was the chairman of Bristol Rovers Football Club for sixteen months between April 2007 and August 2008, and spent 23 years on the board of directors.

Craig first joined the board of the football club in 1986, when Denis Dunford became chairman, and later became vice-chairman when Dunford's son Geoff Dunford succeeded him. When Dunford Jr. stepped down in April 2007 Craig took over as chairman until Nick Higgs took the position in 2008, and after this he remained on the board of directors until his death late in 2009.

While at Bristol Rovers he had a special interest in the community and youth football departments of the club, but was forced to step back from his role after suffering a heart attack in February 2009. Although he recovered from this, he died in November 2009 following a short illness.

== Sources ==
- "Former Bristol Rovers chairman Ron Craig has died". This is Bristol. Bristol Evening Post. 1 December 2009.
- "Ex-Bristol Rovers chairman Ron Craig dies after illness". BBC Sport. 1 December 2009.
- "Chairman's tribute to Ron Craig". Bristol Rovers Football Club. 3 December 2009.

Sporting positions
Preceded by Geoff Dunford	Bristol Rovers F.C. chairman April 2007–August 2008	Succeeded by Nick Higgs
