= Ben Hunt (footballer) =

English footballer (born 1990)

Personal information
- Full name: Benjamin Hunt
- Date of birth: 23 January 1990 (age 36)
- Place of birth: Southwark, England
- Height: 6 ft 1 in (1.85 m)
- Position: Striker

Youth career
- 2002–2008: West Ham United

Senior career*
Years	Team	Apps	(Gls)
2008–2010	Bristol Rovers	14	(0)
2009–2010	→ Gloucester City (loan)	12	(10)
2010	→ Newport County (loan)	2	(2)
2010–2011	Dover Athletic	18	(10)
2011	Lewes	15	(9)
2011	Weston-super-Mare	2	(3)
2011–2012	Gloucester City	8	(6)
2011–2012	Bishop's Stortford	5	(3)
2014	Tilbury	6	(1)
2015–2016	Cray Wanderers	25	(10)
2016–2017	Cray Valley Paper Mills		
- * Club domestic league appearances and goals as of 18:24, 30 April 2016 (UTC)

Benjamin Hunt is an English professional footballer who plays as a striker. He was a youth player at West Ham United, and made regular appearances in their reserve side, but never made the progression into their first team. At the end of the 2007–08 season he was released by the Hammers and he signed for Bristol Rovers.

Hunt's debut in senior football came on 16 August 2008 for Bristol Rovers in a League One match against Brighton & Hove Albion, when he came on as a 72nd-minute substitute for Darryl Duffy.

Ben Hunt agreed a one-month loan deal with Conference North side Gloucester City on 17 December 2009. He scored on his debut against Redditch United on Boxing Day. In March 2009 he joined Conference South champions Newport County on loan.

Along with 14 other players, he was released by Rovers at the end of the 2009–10 season. He signed for Dover Athletic on 20 July 2010. On 19 February 2011 he signed for Lewes in the Conference South.

Hunt then played for Conference South side Weston-super-Mare, after joining in August 2011. In October 2011, Hunt left Weston-super-Mare and signed for Gloucester City.

He joined Bishop's Stortford in March 2012. He first appeared for Cray Wanderers in the 2014–15 season, playing seven games. He returned 12 months later and scored on his first two appearances.
