= Ryan Green =

Welsh footballer

Personal information
- Date of birth: 20 October 1980 (age 46)
- Place of birth: Cardiff, Wales
- Position: Defender

Senior career*
Years	Team	Apps	(Gls)
1997–2001	Wolverhampton Wanderers	16	(0)
2001	→ Torquay United (loan)	10	(0)
2001–2002	Millwall	13	(0)
2002	→ Cardiff City (loan)	0	(0)
2002–2003	Sheffield Wednesday	4	(0)
2003–2006	Hereford United	90	(3)
2006–2009	Bristol Rovers	71	(0)
2009–2012	Hereford United	100	(2)
2012–2014	Port Talbot Town	53	(1)
2014–2015	Merthyr Town	14	(3)
2015–2019	Hereford	106	(2)
2019-2024	Westfields		

International career
1998–2001	Wales U21	16	(0)
1998	Wales	2	(0)
- * Club domestic league appearances and goals as of 14:09, 25 October 2018 (UTC)

Ryan Green (born 20 October 1980) is a Welsh former footballer who played as a defender. He earned two international caps for Wales in 1998, breaking Ryan Giggs's record as their youngest player, a record which has since been surpassed.

== Club career ==
=== Wolverhampton Wanderers ===
Green began his career as a trainee with Wolverhampton Wanderers turning professional in October 1997. Despite already being a full international, manager Mark McGhee kept him in the reserves. His successor Colin Lee needed a replacement for defender Kevin Muscat on 10 November 1998 and gave Green his debut in a 2–1 First Division victory against Sheffield United at Molineux. He was praised by local newspaper Express & Star for his performance, and was given an ovation when he was substituted due to injury. During his recuperation, Muscat recovered and regained his place in the team.

Green handed in a transfer request in January 2000, when he was not chosen for an FA Cup game against Sheffield Wednesday, and Lee stated that his preferred right backs were Muscat and Darren Bazeley. However, at the start of the 2000–01 season, Bazeley was moved into right midfield and Muscat to left back, giving Green an extended run in the team. On 17 October, away to West Bromwich Albion in the Black Country derby, he was sent off in the 40th minute of a 1–0 loss, for two fouls on Jason Roberts in a three-minute space. He never started for the team again, and totalled eight starts and four substitute appearances in his time at the club.

In early 2001, Green handed in another transfer request, and joined Torquay United on loan in March, where Lee was assistant manager. He played ten times as they successfully fought off relegation to the Conference, despite scoring an own goal in the final game of the season, a 3–2 win away to Barnet which relegated the hosts.

=== Millwall and Sheffield Wednesday ===
Green moved to fellow First Division side Millwall on a free transfer on 20 October 2001, until the end of the season, signed by his former Wolves manager McGhee. He made his debut later that day in a 3–3 draw against Nottingham Forest at The New Den.

He almost joined Bradford City in 2002, a move scuppered by the financial impact on Football League clubs of the ITV Digital collapse. Instead he joined Cardiff City on a monthly contract in November 2002, joining Sheffield Wednesday two weeks later. He was released by Wednesday at the end of the season, having been relegated to the Second Division.

=== Hereford United ===
In August 2003, Green signed for Conference side Hereford United. On 23 September, against Telford United at Edgar Street, he scored his first senior goal, a left-foot volley to seal a 2–1 win in the third minute of added time and keep the Bulls in first place in the league. On 13 December, he was sent off in the last minute of a 0–1 home loss to Tamworth. The team finished the season in the play-off places, where they were eliminated in the semi-finals by Aldershot.

Green played 26 league games in the 2004–05 season, scoring his only goal of the campaign on 30 August in a 4–1 win at Northwich Victoria. Hereford again reached the play-off semi-finals, losing 2–1 on aggregate to Stevenage Borough.

He opened his third season at the club on 13 August 2005, scoring the third goal of a 4–0 home win over Scarborough. Sixteen days later, in a 1–0 win at Tamworth, he was sent off for violent conduct. For a third successive season, Hereford made the play-offs, and dispatched Morecambe in the semi-finals to set up a final against Halifax Town on 20 May 2006. In the decisive game, at Leicester City's Walkers Stadium, he scored the 108th-minute winner in a 3–2 victory.

=== Bristol Rovers ===
On 31 May 2006, Green signed a two-year contract with Bristol Rovers of League Two. He made his debut on 5 August, replacing Chris Carruthers for the final 15 minutes of a 2–1 loss at Peterborough United. Green made 33 league appearances in his first season with the Pirates but suffered a foot injury in the 4–3 away defeat to Grimsby Town on 20 February 2007. Due to the injury, he missed the Football League Trophy final, which his team lost to Doncaster Rovers. He returned for the final stages of the campaign as they qualified for the play-offs. After eliminating Lincoln 7–4 on aggregate in the semi-finals, he played in the final on 26 May at Wembley Stadium, a 3–1 win over Shrewsbury Town.

A broken jaw and further Achilles tendon problems in a volatile match at Swindon Town ruled him out for the rest of the following season. A hamstring injury sustained in a pre-season friendly added to Green's injury nightmare. His contract was not renewed, and he left the club on 8 May 2009.

=== Return to Hereford United ===
On 5 June 2009, Green re-signed for Hereford United on a one-year deal ahead of the 2009–10 season. Following their relegation in 2012, Hereford did not offer him a new contract.

=== Later career ===
In August 2012, Green joined Welsh Premier League club Port Talbot Town.

Green left Port Talbot after one season and in June 2014, he joined Merthyr Town, where he captained the team as they won the Southern League Division One South & West, and promotion to the Premier Division.

On 14 September 2015, he signed for newly formed Hereford, the phoenix club of Hereford United, playing in the Midland League Premier Division. Following a successful season which resulted in promotion, Green signed for a further season in July 2016.

In September 2018, Green was appointed player-manager of Hereford after the departure of Peter Beadle, overseeing five matches before Marc Richards was appointed as permanent manager on 2 October. In December 2018, Green took a break from playing, but remained at Hereford as a scout.

On 11 July 2019, Green joined Hereford-based Hellenic League Premier Division club Westfields. In July 2020, he renewed his stay with the club for a further year, however two months later it was announced that he was leaving the club due to work commitments.

In July 2023, Green rejoined Westfields, aged 42.

== International career ==
Cardiff-born Green made his full international debut against Malta on 3 June 1998, before playing a senior club game. At the age of 17 years and 226 days, he became their youngest international, eclipsing the record of Ryan Giggs. Wales manager Bobby Gould went on to select him for a match against Tunisia, his second and final cap. Giggs himself called the selection of Green a "typical Gould stunt", and wrote in his autobiography that he and Green only had a hometown in common.

Green's record stood until it was surpassed by Lewin Nyatanga in 2004, aged 17 years and 195 days. After being occupied by Gareth Bale, it is currently held by Harry Wilson, who was 16 years and 207 days old on his 2013 debut.

== Career statistics ==
=== Club ===
As of match played 31 March 2012

Appearances and goals by club, season and competition
Club	Season	League			National cup (Note: Includes FA Cup, Welsh Cup)		League cup (Note: Includes EFL Cup, Welsh League Cup)		Other		Total	
Club	Season	Division	Apps	Goals	Apps	Goals	Apps	Goals	Apps	Goals	Apps	Goals
Wolverhampton Wanderers	1998–99	First Division	1	0	0	0	0	0	0	0	1	0
Wolverhampton Wanderers	1999–2000	First Division	0	0	0	0	0	0	0	0	0	0
Wolverhampton Wanderers	2000–01	First Division	7	0	2	0	2	0	0	0	11	0
Wolverhampton Wanderers	Total		8	0	2	0	2	0	0	0	12	0
Torquay United (loan)	2000–01	Third Division	10	0	0	0	0	0	0	0	10	0
Millwall	2001–02	First Division	13	0	0	0	0	0	0	0	13	0
Cardiff City (loan)	2002–03	Second Division	0	0	0	0	0	0	1 (Note: Appearance(s) in Football League Trophy)	0	1	0
Sheffield Wednesday	2002–03	First Division	4	0	0	0	0	0	0	0	4	0
Hereford United	2003–04	Football Conference	38	1	1	0	—		5 (Note: Two appearances in Football League Trophy; one appearance in FA Trophy; two appearances in Football Conference play-offs)	0	44	1
Hereford United	2004–05	Conference National	26	1	0	0	—		3 (Note: One appearance in Football League Trophy; two appearances in Conference National play-offs)	0	29	1
Hereford United	2005–06	Conference National	26	1	2	0	—		5 (Note: Two appearances in Football League Trophy; three appearances and one goal in Conference National play-offs)	1	33	2
Hereford United	Total		90	3	3	0	—		13	1	106	4
Bristol Rovers	2006–07	League Two	33	0	2	0	1	0	6 (Note: Three appearances in Football League Trophy; three appearances in League Two play-offs)	0	42	0
Bristol Rovers	2007–08	League One	12	0	1	0	0	0	1	0	14	0
Bristol Rovers	2008–09	League One	26	0	1	0	0	0	1	0	28	0
Bristol Rovers	Total		71	0	4	0	1	0	8	0	84	0
Hereford United	2009–10	League Two	31	1	1	0	2	0	2	0	36	1
Hereford United	2010–11	League Two	41	1	3	0	1	0	1	0	46	1
Hereford United	2011–12	League Two	28	0	1	0	2	0	0	0	31	0
Hereford United	Total		100	2	5	0	5	0	3	0	113	2
Port Talbot Town	2012–13	Welsh Premier League	29	1	0	0	1	0	0	0	30	1
Port Talbot Town	2013–14	Welsh Premier League	24	0	0	0	2	0	0	0	26	0
Port Talbot Town	Total		53	1	0	0	3	0	0	0	56	1
Career total			349	6	14	0	12	0	25	1	400	7

== Honours ==
Hereford United

- Conference National play-offs: 2006

Bristol Rovers

- Football League Two play-offs: 2007
- Football League Trophy runner-up: 2006–07

Merthyr Town

- Southern Football League South & West: 2014–15

Hereford

- Midland Football League Premier Division: 2015–16
- Southern Football League South & West: 2016–17
- Midland Football League League Cup: 2015–16
- Herefordshire FA County Cup: 2015–16
- FA Vase runner-up: 2015–16
