= Jeff Hughes (footballer) =

Northern Irish footballer (born 1985)

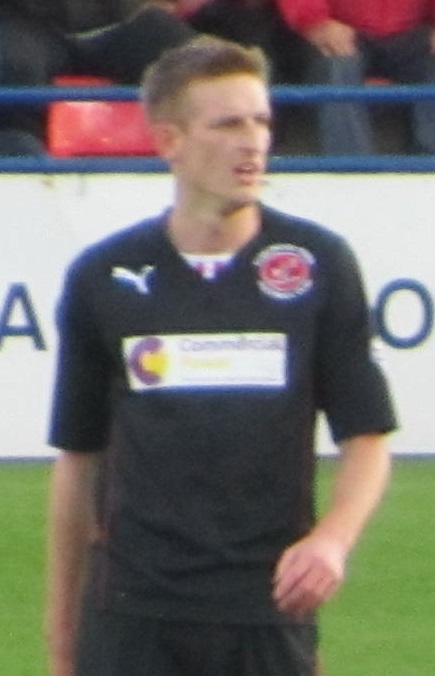
- Hughes playing for Fleetwood Town in 2013

Personal information
- Full name: Jeffrey Edward Hughes
- Date of birth: 29 May 1985 (age 41)
- Place of birth: Larne, Northern Ireland
- Height: 6 ft 1 in (1.85 m)
- Position: Midfielder

Team information
- Current team: Larne (head of youth development phase)

Youth career
- 2001–2002: Ballymena United
- 2002–2003: Larne

Senior career*
Years	Team	Apps	(Gls)
2003–2005	Larne	47	(1)
2005–2007	Lincoln City	63	(8)
2007–2008	Crystal Palace	10	(0)
2007–2008	→ Peterborough United (loan)	7	(1)
2008	→ Bristol Rovers (loan)	0	(0)
2008–2011	Bristol Rovers	129	(28)
2011–2013	Notts County	89	(20)
2013–2015	Fleetwood Town	47	(4)
2015–2016	Cambridge United	9	(0)
2016	→ Tranmere Rovers (loan)	18	(1)
2016–2018	Tranmere Rovers	76	(4)
2018–2023	Larne	90	(10)
Total		585	(77)

International career^{‡}
2006	Northern Ireland U21	7	(3)
2006	Northern Ireland	2	(0)
- * Club domestic league appearances and goals as of 12:49 (UTC) 8 February 2023 ‡ National team caps and goals as of 12:49, 8 February 2023 (UTC)

Jeffrey Edward Hughes (born 29 May 1985) is a Northern Irish retired footballer who played as a defensive midfielder. He has also played internationally for Northern Ireland, making his debut during their 2006 summer tour of the United States. He is Head of Youth Development Phase at Larne.

== Career ==
Hughes played for the Ballymena United academy, before transferring to the academy at hometown club Larne. He went on to make his Irish League debut for The Harbour Rats, before moving to The Football League in England to join Lincoln City in League Two.

He was originally deployed in the left-back position for Larne, however under John Schofield at Lincoln, he proved himself equally adept at playing a more attacking role as a wing-back and a winger on the left side.

Despite Hughes' three goals over two legs against Bristol Rovers, Lincoln experienced their fourth-successive play-off defeat in 2007, and Hughes moved to Crystal Palace of the Championship, reaching his highest level yet. However, he struggled at Selhurst Park. He went on a two-month loan to Peterborough United in November 2007, scoring once against Bradford City. In the January transfer window, Peterborough tried to agree terms with Hughes to sign him, but failed to do so, and thus he returned to Palace.

At the end of March, Bristol Rovers signed Hughes on a loan deal until the end of the season, but he was injured on his reserve team debut, after giving Rovers the lead. He returned to Palace for treatment, before signing permanently for Rovers in the summer.

On 30 April 2010 he was called to the Northern Ireland B national football team for a friendly against Scotland national football B team on 6 May 2010.

On 18 September 2010 Hughes scored his first professional hat-trick away to Dagenham and Redbridge, a game which Rovers won 3–0.

He was one of seventeen players released by the team in May 2011.

On 28 June 2011, Hughes signed for League One side Notts County on a two-year deal. He scored on his league debut against Carlisle United on 6 August 2011.

On 22 May 2013, Hughes signed for Fleetwood Town.

On 14 July 2015, Hughes signed a two-year contract with Cambridge United.

In January 2016, Hughes moved to Tranmere Rovers, on loan for the rest of the season, before signing a two-year deal with them in July of that year.

On 11 April 2018, Hughes rejoined his hometown club Larne on a 3-year deal. During his second spell at the club, Hughes lead the Inver men to the Championship title in 2019 and promotion back into the Irish Premiership, for the first time since 2005. Success followed, as Larne would go onto win the County Antrim Shield three times, qualify for Europe on two occasions, including a magnificent campaign in 2021, winning through against Bala Town and Aarhus GF. Domestically, Hughes guided Larne to another Irish Cup final, losing to Linfield, but ultimately winning their first Irish League title in the clubs 134-year history in 2022–23 season.

On 8 February 2023, Hughes announced his retirement following a serious injury, remaining at Larne in the role of Head of Youth Development Phase.

== Career statistics ==
As of 10 July 2017

Club	Season	League			FA Cup		League Cup		Other		Total	
Club	Season	Division	Apps	Goals	Apps	Goals	Apps	Goals	Apps	Goals	Apps	Goals
Lincoln City	2005–06	League Two	24	2	0	0	0	0	0	0	24	2
Lincoln City	2006–07	League Two	41	6	0	0	1	0	2 (Note: Appearances in League Two play-offs)	3	44	9
Lincoln City	Total		65	8	0	0	1	0	2	3	68	11
Crystal Palace	2007–08	Championship	10	0	0	0	0	0	0	0	10	0
Peterborough United (loan)	2007–08	League Two	7	1	2	0	0	0	0	0	9	1
Bristol Rovers	2008–09	League One	43	6	1	0	1	0	1 (Note: Appearance(s) in Football League Trophy)	0	46	6
Bristol Rovers	2009–10	League One	44	12	1	1	2	0	1	0	48	13
Bristol Rovers	2010–11	League One	42	10	1	0	1	0	2	1	46	11
Bristol Rovers	Total		129	28	3	1	4	0	4	1	140	30
Notts County	2011–12	League One	45	13	4	4	1	0	0	0	50	17
Notts County	2012–13	League One	44	7	3	0	1	0	1	0	49	7
Notts County	Total		89	20	7	4	2	0	1	0	99	24
Fleetwood Town	2013–14	League Two	25	3	3	1	1	0	3	1	32	5
Fleetwood Town	2014–15	League One	22	1	1	0	0	0	0	0	23	1
Fleetwood Town	Total		47	4	4	1	1	0	3	1	55	6
Cambridge United	2015–16	League Two	9	0	1	1	0	0	1	0	11	1
Tranmere Rovers (loan)	2015–16	National League	18	1	0	0	---		0	0	18	1
Tranmere Rovers	2016–17	National League	40	2	0	0	---		3 (Note: Appearances in National League play-offs)	0	43	2
Career total			414	64	17	7	8	0	14	5	453	76

== Honours ==
Tranmere Rovers

- National League play-offs: 2018

Larne

- NIFL Championship: 2018–19
- County Antrim Shield: 2020–21, 2021–22, 2022-23

Individual

- NIFL Championship Team of the Year: 2018–19
