= Aaron Lescott =

English footballer (born 1978)

Personal information
- Full name: Aaron Anthony Lescott
- Date of birth: 2 December 1978 (age 47)
- Place of birth: Birmingham, England
- Height: 5 ft 6 in (1.68 m)
- Position: Defender

Youth career
- 1994–1998: Aston Villa

Senior career*
Years	Team	Apps	(Gls)
1998–2000	Aston Villa	0	(0)
2000	→ Lincoln City (loan)	5	(0)
2000–2001	Sheffield Wednesday	37	(0)
2001–2004	Stockport County	72	(1)
2004	→ Bristol Rovers (loan)	8	(0)
2004–2010	Bristol Rovers	199	(5)
2010	→ Cheltenham Town (loan)	8	(0)
2010–2011	Walsall	34	(1)
2011–2013	Halesowen Town	5	(0)
2025–2026	Redditch Borough	14	(0)
Total		382	(7)
- * Club domestic league appearances and goals

Aaron Anthony Lescott (born 2 December 1978) is an English former professional footballer who played as a defender. A product of the Aston Villa Academy, Lescott played at a number of Football League clubs, most notably a six-year spell at Bristol Rovers and a three-year spell at Stockport County.

== Playing career ==
Lescott started his career as a trainee with Aston Villa making only one first team appearance for them (in the FA Cup third round tie against Hull City). Unable to establish himself at Villa, he had a loan spell with Lincoln City in 2000, before signing for Sheffield Wednesday in October of the same year for a fee of £100,000.

He made 43 appearances for Sheffield Wednesday before moving to Stockport County in 2001 for a fee of £75,000. He made 81 appearances and scored one goal for County against Swindon Town, before leaving to join Bristol Rovers in August 2004. He won runner up in the 2007–2008 player of the year competition, with captain Stuart Campbell coming first.

In March 2010 he joined Cheltenham Town on a one-month loan, having been unable to regain his place in the Bristol Rovers team after recovering from injury.

Along with 14 other players, he was released by Rovers at the end of the 2009/10 season. On 14 July 2010 Lescott completed a free transfer move to League One outfit Walsall on a one-year contract following his release from Bristol Rovers. He scored his only goal for Walsall in a 2–2 draw with former club Bristol Rovers.

Following the expiry of that contract, Lescott sought out other clubs and went on trial with Yeovil Town in July 2011.

On 9 August 2011, Lescott signed for Halesowen Town.

In 2025, having returned to playing with veteran's football, Lescott joined Hellenic League Division One club Redditch Borough.

== Coaching career ==
In April 2026, Lescott was announced as first-team coach for Stourport Swifts ahead of the 2026–27 season.

In May 2026, Lescott, however, joined Telford Town as assistant manager.

== Personal life ==
Born in England, Lescott is of Kittitan descent. He is the older brother of former Manchester City, Aston Villa, and England defender Joleon Lescott.

== Honours ==
Bristol Rovers

- Football League Two play-offs: 2007
- Football League Trophy runner-up: 2006–07
