= Stuart Campbell (footballer) =

Footballer (born 1977)

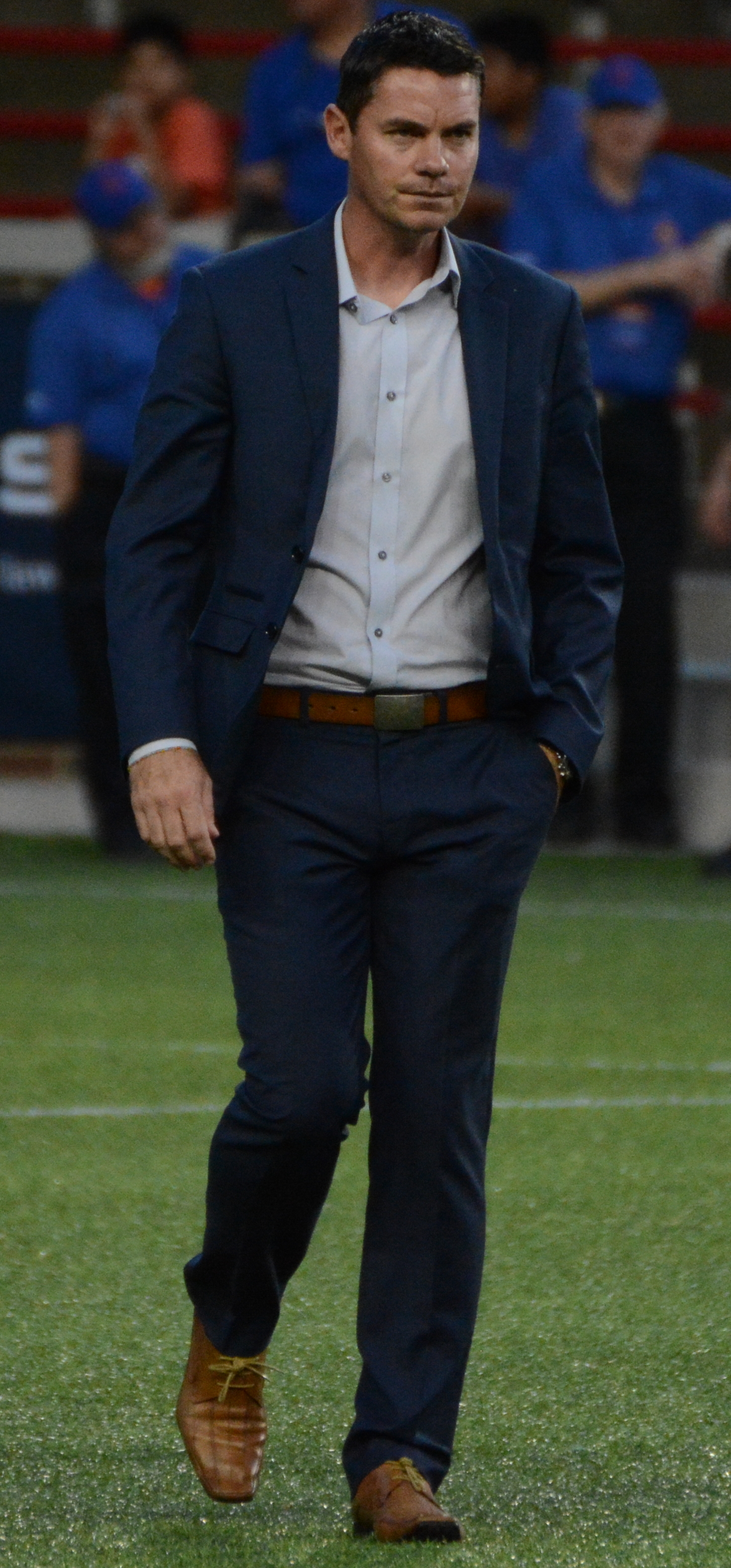
- Campbell coaching the Tampa Bay Rowdies in 2017

Personal information
- Full name: Stuart Pearson Campbell
- Date of birth: 9 December 1977 (age 48)
- Place of birth: Corby, England
- Position: Midfielder

Youth career
- Corby Town
- Leicester City

Senior career*
Years	Team	Apps	(Gls)
1996–2001	Leicester City	37	(0)
2000	→ Birmingham City (loan)	2	(0)
2000–2001	→ Grimsby Town (loan)	38	(2)
2001–2004	Grimsby Town	117	(10)
2004–2011	Bristol Rovers	288	(3)
2012–2013	Tampa Bay Rowdies	28	(0)
Total		510	(15)

International career
1998–1999	Scotland U21	14	(0)

Managerial career
- 2011: Bristol Rovers (caretaker)
- 2014–2015: Tampa Bay Rowdies (assistant)
- 2015–2018: Tampa Bay Rowdies
- * Club domestic league appearances and goals

Stuart Pearson Campbell (born 9 December 1977) is a football coach and former professional player.

As a player, he was as a midfielder between 1996 and 2013. He has previously played for Leicester City where he played in the English Premier League before moving on loan to Birmingham City and Grimsby Town. He signed with Grimsby on a permanent basis in 2001, and he remained with the club until joining Bristol Rovers in the summer of 2004. Campbell became club captain at Rovers and in 2012 he briefly managed the club on a caretaker basis before leaving the club at the end of the season. Born in England, he won 14 caps for the Scotland U21 national team at international level. In 2012 he moved to the United States and signed with the Tampa Bay Rowdies where he played for one season before becoming Assistant Coach. In August 2015 he assumed the role of Head Coach after the midseason firing of Thomas Rongen, he stayed in this position until 2018.

== Playing career ==
=== Leicester City ===
Campbell was born in Corby, Northamptonshire. As a youth he played for hometown club Corby Town, before joining Leicester City, for whom he made his first-team debut in 1996 aged 18. Though manager Martin O'Neill rated him as an outstanding prospect, he averaged fewer than ten Premier League appearances a season for Leicester, mostly as a substitute. In 2000, he was loaned to First Division club Birmingham City, where he played two games before returning to Leicester.

Leicester won the League Cup twice while Campbell was at the club. First in 1996–97 and again in 1999-2000. Both times he contributed two substitute appearances during the cup runs, and in the latter victory both of these came over both legs in the semi-final against Aston Villa.

=== Grimsby Town ===
New Grimsby Town manager Lennie Lawrence made Campbell his first signing in September 2000, landing the winger on a three-month loan deal which was later extended to a season loan.

After impressing while on loan at Blundell Park, Campbell was allowed to join Grimsby permanently for a fee of £200,000, where he signed a three-year contract. Campbell played under three different managers at Grimsby, Lennie Lawrence, Paul Groves and Nicky Law. His six goals in the 2002–03 season was enough to make him the club's joint top scorer; they were relegated from the First Division after a five-year stay in the second tier of English football. Campbell's contract expired at the end of the next season, and with the club again relegated, he decided against an offer to stay with Grimsby.

=== Bristol Rovers ===
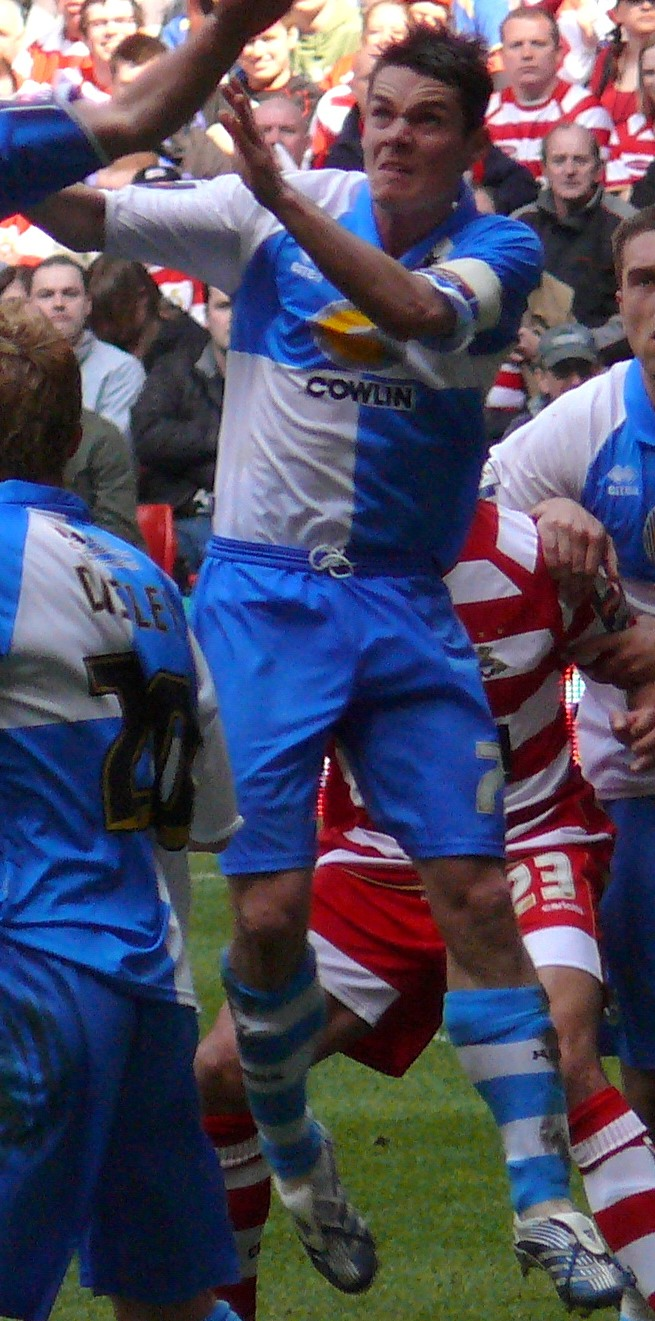
Campbell playing for Bristol Rovers in 2007

Campbell signed for Bristol Rovers of Football League Two. Appointed captain in November 2006, Campbell led Bristol Rovers to the final of the Football League Trophy and promotion to League One in the 2006–07 season. One of his three goals for the club came in the play-off semi final against Lincoln City. He signed a two-year contract extension in May 2007. Campbell and team-mate Craig Hinton started studying for coaching qualifications in 2008. Campbell then led the team to the quarter-finals of the FA Cup in the 2007–08 season and became one of the most popular skippers at the club.

Following the dismissal of Dave Penney as manager, Campbell was appointed caretaker manager of Rovers until the end of the season, with 12 games remaining in which to avoid relegation from League One. He failed to save the club from the drop to League Two however, and when Paul Buckle was appointed as the club's new manager he made it clear that Campbell had no future as a player at the club. The two parties eventually agreed a deal to release Campbell from his contract on 20 December 2011.

=== Tampa Bay Rowdies ===
On 27 December 2011, the Tampa Bay Rowdies of the North American Soccer League announced that Campbell had signed with the club. He soon moved into the role of a player/coach under manager Ricky Hill, and when Campbell retired from the pitch in 2013, he became a full-time assistant coach.

== International career ==
Though English-born, he was capped 14 times for Scotland at under-21 level, qualifying through his parents.

== Coaching career ==
In August 2015, first-year Rowdies coach Thomas Rongen was fired after the club struggled to a 2–2–6 start to the NASL's fall season. Campbell was promoted to manager and led the team to a 3–4–4 record over their remaining games. He coached the Rowdies in 2016 and 2017, before he and the club mutually parted ways in May 2018.

Campbell now runs his own soccer camps for youngsters, based out of Tampa Bay. As of 2022, he was director of the Nike Sports camp.

== Honours ==
Leicester City

- Football League Cup runner-up: 1998–99

Bristol Rovers

- Football League Two play-offs: 2007
- Football League Trophy runner-up: 2006–07
