= Steve Elliott (footballer, born 1978) =

English footballer

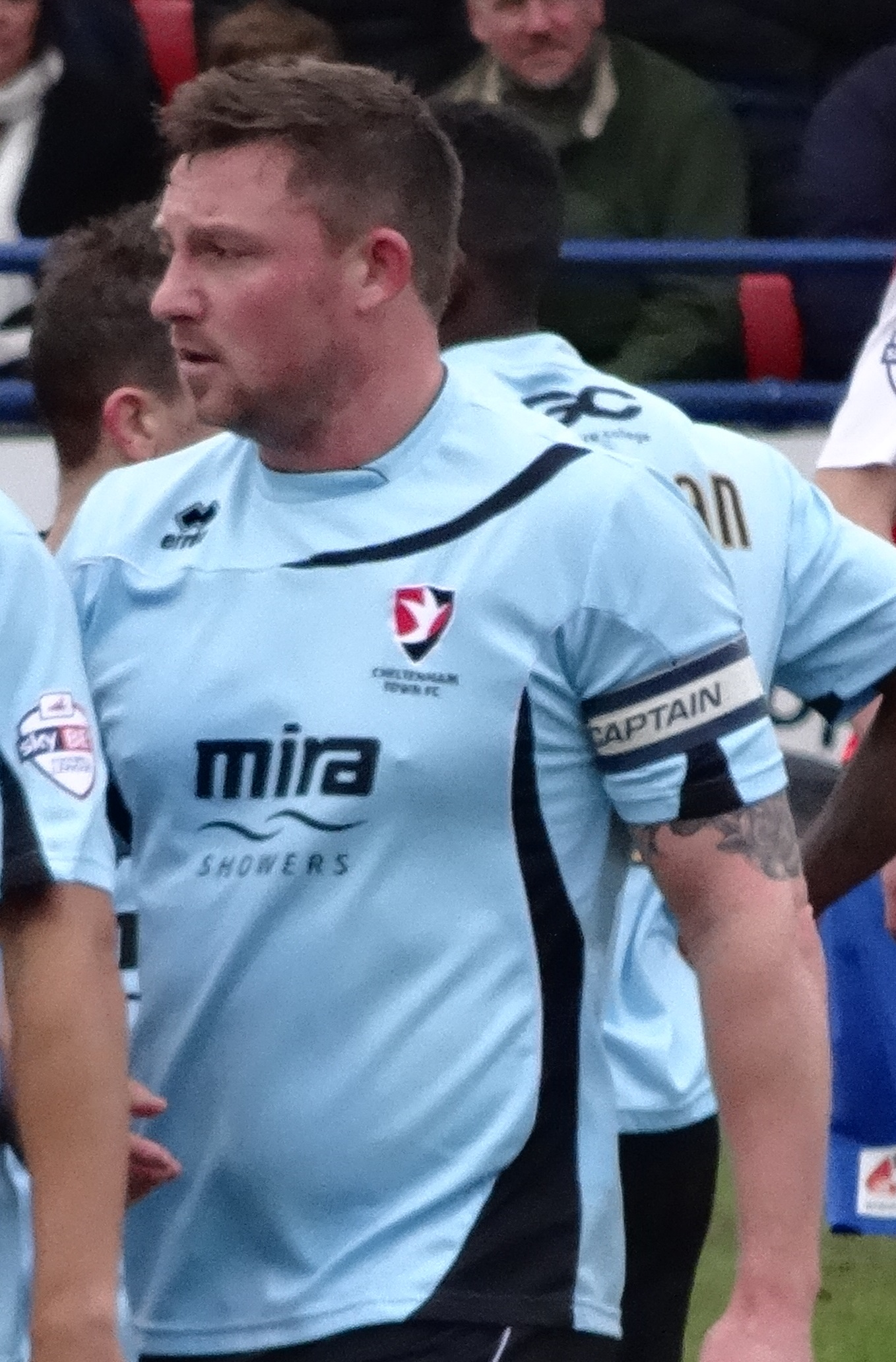
- Elliott playing for Cheltenham Town in 2014

Personal information
- Full name: Steven William Elliott
- Date of birth: 29 October 1978 (age 48)
- Place of birth: Derby, England
- Height: 6 ft 1 in (1.85 m)
- Position: Defender

Team information
- Current team: Cheltenham Town (assistant manager)

Youth career
- ?–1997: Derby County

Senior career*
Years	Team	Apps	(Gls)
1997–2004	Derby County	72	(1)
2003–2004	→ Blackpool (loan)	12	(0)
2004	Blackpool	16	(0)
2004–2010	Bristol Rovers	218	(17)
2010–2015	Cheltenham Town	174	(9)
2015	Bath City	0	(0)
Total		492	(27)

International career
1998	England U21	3	(0)
- * Club domestic league appearances and goals

Steven William Elliott (born 29 October 1978) is an English former professional footballer who played as a defender.

== Club career ==
=== Derby County ===
Born in Derby, Derbyshire, Elliott came through the ranks at Pride Park and made his first team debut in the League Cup in September 1997. He made a total of 72 league appearances for Derby County, including 14 as a substitute and one goal against Wimbledon. In November 2003 he moved to Blackpool on loan. The deal later became permanent.

=== Blackpool ===
After making his move permanent, Elliott made 28 appearances for Blackpool including the victorious 2004 Football League Trophy Final at the Millennium Stadium in Cardiff.

=== Bristol Rovers ===
Elliott then signed for Bristol Rovers in the summer of 2004. He quickly established himself as a regular part of the Rovers defence. He made 40 appearances in his first season and scored twice, before going on to make 45 appearances in his second season, again scoring twice. His third season in Bristol saw Rovers reach the 2007 Football League Trophy Final and League Two play-off final, losing in Cardiff but winning promotion in London.

In June 2007, Elliott signed a two-year extension to his contract, taking his contract up to 2010. The 2007–08 season saw Rovers reach the quarter-finals of the FA Cup for only the second time in their history. Elliott however missed the fifth round win against Southampton and quarter-final defeat to West Bromwich Albion having suffered an injury early in the fourth round replay against Fulham.

He continued to feature regularly for Rovers until an injury hit 2009–10 season, which proved to be his last for the club.

=== Cheltenham Town ===
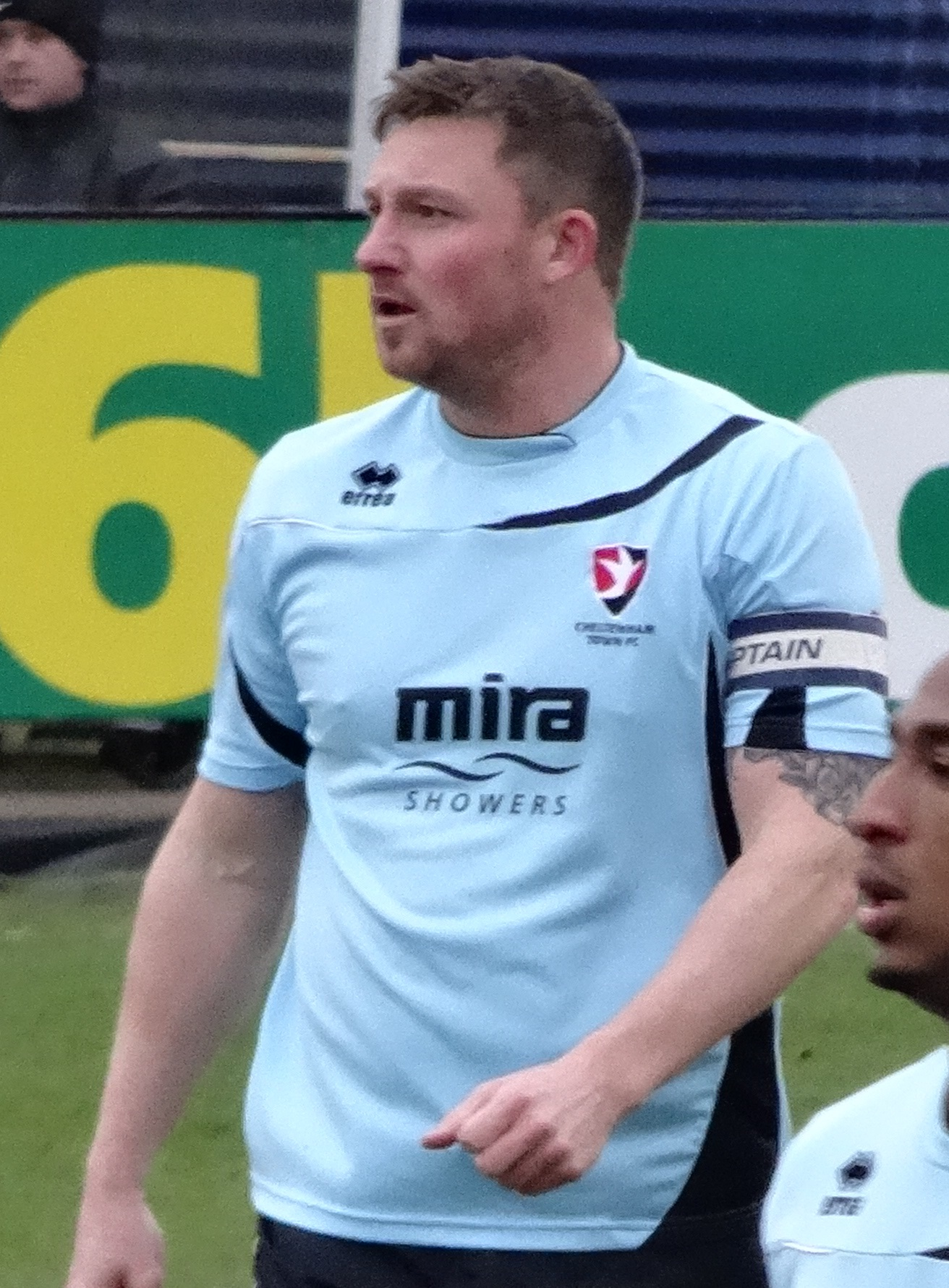
Elliott playing for Cheltenham Town in 2014

The summer of 2010 saw Elliott move 35 miles up the M5 to Cheltenham Town on a two-year deal. His second season with the club saw Elliott again play at a Wembley Stadium play-off final as Cheltenham lost out to Crewe Alexandra. He stepped up to the role of player-coach at Whaddon Road in May 2014, before being released by manager Paul Buckle in February 2015.

Elliott signed for Conference South side Bath City but returned to Cheltenham days later to assist caretaker manager Russell Milton who had replaced the outgoing Buckle.

== International career ==
Elliott enjoyed a brief international career while at Derby. He managed to play twice for England at under-21 level against France and Argentina in 1998.

== Honours ==
Blackpool

- Football League Trophy: 2003–04

Bristol Rovers

- Football League Two play-offs: 2007
- Football League Trophy runner-up: 2006–07
