= 2007–08 Bristol Rovers F.C. season =

Bristol Rovers F.C.
2007–08 season
- Chairman: Ron Craig
- Manager: Paul Trollope
- League One: 16th
- FA Cup: Quarter-finalist
- League Cup: 2nd round
- Football League Trophy: 2nd round
- Top goalscorer: League: Rickie Lambert (13); All: Rickie Lambert (19)
- Highest home attendance: 12,077 v West Bromwich Albion
- Lowest home attendance: 3,313 v AFC Bournemouth

The 2007–08 season covers the period from 1 July 2007 to 30 June 2008. It marks the 125th year of football played by Bristol Rovers F.C. and their 81st season in The Football League. The team plays in Football League One having won the Football League Two playoff game at Wembley Stadium on 26 May 2007, beating Shrewsbury 3–1 in front of a crowd of 61,589.

== Chronological list of events ==
This is a list of the significant events to occur at the club during the 2007–08 season, presented in chronological order. This list does not include transfers, which are listed in the transfers section below, or match results, which are in the results section.

- 7 July: Aaron Lescott signed a new two-year contract, running until the summer of 2009.
- 10 July: New contracts were signed by Richard Walker, Lewis Haldane and Chris Carruthers. Haldane signed a three-year contract, Walker a two-year one and Carruthers one-year.
- 10 August: First-Team Coach Paul Trollope and Director of Football Lennie Lawrence both signed extended contracts with the club. Bill Smith resigned from his position as chief executive to concentrate on his other business commitments.
- 17 August: A delay in the demolition of the Memorial Stadium was announced, meaning that the club will play the whole season there and not move to Cheltenham in January as had previously been announced.
- 18 August: Craig Disley signed a one-year contract extension, keeping him at the club until the summer of 2009.
- 23 August: Goalkeeping coach Steve Book was registered as a player after backup goalie Mike Green broke his finger in a reserve match.
- 28 August: Rovers' League Cup run came to an end after a 2–1 defeat to Premier League side West Ham. The game was overshadowed by the injury to Kieron Dyer who suffered a suspected broken leg.
- 4 September: Charlie Clough, who was promoted to the first team squad in the summer, signed his first professional contract on his 17th birthday.
- 2 October: Edward Ware is appointed to the club's board of directors.
- 9 October: Rovers' hopes of reaching the Football League Trophy final for the second year running came to an end as they lost their second round tie with AFC Bournemouth 1–0.
- 15 October: Former Rovers defender Billy Clark was appointed the club's new under-18's coach.
- 24 November: Both Steve Elliott and Richard Walker received 3 match bans after being handed straight red cards by referee Rob Styles in a bad tempered derby with Swindon Town. Joe Jacobson picked up his fifth yellow card of the season in the same game, resulting in a one match suspension for the Welshman.
- 22 December: Craig Disley received his fifth yellow card of the season in the match away to Leeds resulting in a one-game suspension.
- 26 December: Captain Stuart Campbell picked up his fifth yellow card of the season. He was suspended for the FA Cup Third Round tie with Fulham
- 22 January: Rovers beat Fulham in the 3rd round of the FA cup, after drawing the original match 2:2 they won the replay at The Memorial Stadium on penalties after a 0:0 120 minutes.
- 16 February: Rovers beat Southampton in the 5th round of the FA cup, courtesy of an 84th-minute strike by Rickie Lambert.
- 9 March: The club-record-equalling FA Cup run ended at the quarter-final stage, with a defeat to West Bromwich Albion, in front of a Memorial Stadium record crowd for football of 12,011.
- 3 June: The football club announced that the stadium redevelopment would be postponed for a further year after the initial accommodation providers pulled out and a leak on an unofficial club website caused negotiations with an alternative provider to collapse.

== Fixtures and results ==
=== Legend ===
Win	Draw	Loss

=== League One ===
Date	Opponent	Venue	Result	Attendance	Scorers	League pos	
11 August	Port Vale	Away	1–1	6,808	Williams	7	Report
18 August	Crewe Alexandra	Home	1–1	7,750	Disley	14	Report
25 August	Oldham Athletic	Away	1–0	5,348	Jacobson	9	Report
1 September	Nottingham Forest	Home	2–2	9,080	Anthony, Walker (pen)	8	Report
8 September	Luton Town	Away	2–1	6,131	Lambert (2)	6	Report
14 September	Leeds United	Home	0–3	11,883		7	Report
22 September	Carlisle United	Away	1–1	6,106	Elliott	9	Report
29 September	Leyton Orient	Home	2–3	7,181	Walker (2 pens)	14	Report
2 October	Southend United	Home	1–1	5,762	Walker (pen)	12	Report
6 October	Brighton & Hove Albion	Away	0–0	5,820		15	Report
12 October	Hartlepool United	Away	0–1	4,963		15	Report
20 October	Yeovil Town	Home	1–1	7,726	Elliott	17	Report
27 October	Gillingham	Away	2–3	5,333	Lambert, Pipe	19	Report
3 November	AFC Bournemouth	Home	0–2	6,405		19	Report
6 November	Northampton Town	Away	1–0	5,126	Lambert	18	Report
17 November	Millwall	Home	2–1	6,991	Lambert (pen), Haldane	17	Report
24 November	Swindon Town	Away	0–1	9,342		18	Report
5 December	Cheltenham Town	Home	Postponed (Waterlogged pitch)				
8 December	Swansea City	Home	Postponed (Waterlogged pitch)				
15 December	Huddersfield Town	Away	1–2	8,118	Pipe	19	Report
22 December	Leeds United	Away	0–1	27,863		19	Report
26 December	Luton Town	Home	1–1	7,556	Lambert (pen)	20	Report
29 December	Carlisle United	Home	3–0	6,254	Lines, Hinton, Williams	20	Report
1 January	Southend United	Away	1–0	7,664	Williams	19	Report
11 January	Tranmere Rovers	Away	2–0	5,887	Williams, Lambert	16	Report
19 January	Walsall	Home	1–1	6,276	Disley	16	Report
29 January	Crewe Alexandra	Away	1–1	3,942	Ben Williams (og)	17	Report
2 February	Port Vale	Home	3–2	6,927	Coles, Lines, Lambert (pen)	17	Report
5 February	Cheltenham Town	Home	2–0	6,780	Hinton, Lambert	15	Report
9 February	Doncaster Rovers	Away	0–2	8,168		16	Report
12 February	Oldham Athletic	Home	1–0	5,778	Disley	13	Report
23 February	Tranmere Rovers	Home	1–1	7,777	Disley	15	Report
1 March	Millwall	Away	1–0	9,202	Disley	13	Report
4 March	Doncaster Rovers	Home	0–1	3,933		14	Report
12 March	Northampton Town	Home	1–1	4,657	Rigg	16	Report
15 March	Cheltenham Town	Away	0–1	5,187		16	Report
18 March	Swansea City	Home	0–2	6,410		16	Report
22 March	Huddersfield Town	Home	2–3	6,585	Klein-Davies, Lines	17	Report
24 March	Swansea City	Away	2–2	15,048	Lambert, Disley	18	Report
29 March	Yeovil Town	Away	0–0	6,654		18	Report
5 April	Hartlepool United	Home	0–0	5,526		17	Report
8 April	Nottingham Forest	Away	1–1	15,860	Lambert	16	Report
12 April	AFC Bournemouth	Away	1–2	6,867	Lambert	16	Report
15 April	Walsall	Away	1–0	5,200	Lambert	15	Report
19 April	Gillingham	Home	1–1	6,614	Elliott	16	Report
22 April	Swindon Town	Home	0–1	6,102		16	Report
26 April	Brighton & Hove Albion	Home	0–2	7,590		16	Report
3 May	Leyton Orient	Away	1–3	5,132	Lambert	16	Report

=== FA Cup ===
Round	Date	Opponent	Venue	Result	Attendance	Scorers	Notes	
1	10 November	Leyton Orient	Away	1–1	3,157	Lambert		Report
1 (Replay)	20 November	Leyton Orient	Home	Postponed (Waterlogged pitch)				
1 (Replay)	27 November	Leyton Orient	Home	3–3	3,742	Hinton, Lambert (pen), Disley	Won 6–5 on Penalties kicks	Report
2	1 December	Rushden & Diamonds	Home	5–1	4,816	Williams, Disley, Hinton, Lambert (2)		Report
3	6 January	Fulham	Away	2–2	13,634	Coles, Hinton		Report
3 (Replay)	15 January	Fulham	Home	Postponed (Dangerous Playing Conditions)				
3 (Replay)	22 January	Fulham	Home	0–0	11,882		Won 5–3 on Penalties	Report
4	26 January	Barnet	Away	1–0	5,190	Lambert		Report
5	16 February	Southampton	Home	1–0	11,920	Lambert		Report
QF	9 March	West Bromwich Albion	Home	1–5	12,011	Coles		Report

=== League Cup ===
Round	Date	Opponent	Venue	Result	Attendance	Scorers	Notes	
1	14 August	Crystal Palace	Home	1–1 (FT); 1–1 (AET)	5,566	Disley	Won 4–1 on penalty kicks	Report
2	28 August	West Ham United	Home	1–2	10,831	Williams		Report

=== Football League Trophy ===
Round	Date	Opponent	Venue	Result	Attendance	Scorers	
1	Bye						
2	9 October	AFC Bournemouth	Home	0–1	3,313		Report

== Squad ==
No.	Pos	Nat	Player	Total		League 1		FA Cup		League Cup		Football League Trophy	
No.	Pos	Nat	Player	Apps	Goals	Apps	Goals	Apps	Goals	Apps	Goals	Apps	Goals
1	GK	(England) ENG	Steve Phillips	57	0	46	0	8	0	2	0	1	0
13	GK	(England) ENG	Mike Green	0	0	0	0	0	0	0	0	0	0
33	GK	(England) ENG	Steve Book	0	0	0	0	0	0	0	0	0	0
2	DF	(Wales) WAL	Ryan Green	14	0	12	0	1	0	0	0	1	0
5	DF	(England) ENG	Craig Hinton	33	5	24	2	8	3	0	0	1	0
6	DF	(England) ENG	Steve Elliott	39	3	33	3	3	0	2	0	1	0
11	DF	(England) ENG	Chris Carruthers	24	0	17	0	4	0	2	0	1	0
15	DF	(Wales) WAL	Byron Anthony	23	1	20	1	0	0	2	0	1	0
16	DF	(England) ENG	Danny Coles	30	3	24	1	6	2	0	0	0	0
21	DF	(England) ENG	Tom Parrinello	1	0	0	0	1	0	0	0	0	0
32	DF	(England) ENG	Aaron Lescott	43	0	34	0	7	0	2	0	0	0
23	DF	(Wales) WAL	Ryan Paddock	0	0	0	0	0	0	0	0	0	0
24	DF	(England) ENG	Alex Kite	0	0	0	0	0	0	0	0	0	0
25	DF	(England) ENG	Tom Godsell	0	0	0	0	0	0	0	0	0	0
3	MF	(Wales) WAL	Joe Jacobson	49	1	40	1	7	0	2	0	0	0
4	MF	(England) ENG	Sammy Igoe	28	0	21	0	6	0	1	0	0	0
7	MF	(Scotland) SCO	Stuart Campbell	56	0	46	0	7	0	2	0	1	0
14	MF	(Wales) WAL	David Pipe	50	2	40	2	7	0	2	0	1	0
17	MF	(Wales) WAL	Anthony Pulis	1	0	1	0	0	0	0	0	0	0
17	MF	(England) ENG	Andy Sandell	0	0	0	0	0	0	0	0	0	0
18	MF	(England) ENG	Chris Lines	36	2	27	2	8	0	0	0	1	0
20	MF	(England) ENG	Craig Disley	52	9	44	6	6	2	2	1	0	0
22	MF	(England) ENG	James Palmer	0	0	0	0	0	0	0	0	0	0
26	MF	(Wales) WAL	Lewis Haldane	38	1	32	1	3	0	2	0	1	0
28	MF	(England) ENG	Adam Mahdi	0	0	0	0	0	0	0	0	0	0
30	MF	(England) ENG	Charlie Reece	1	0	1	0	0	0	0	0	0	0
31	MF	(England) ENG	Charlie Clough	1	0	1	0	0	0	0	0	0	0
8	FW	(England) ENG	Andy Williams	52	6	41	4	8	1	2	1	1	0
9	FW	(England) ENG	Rickie Lambert	57	19	46	13	8	6	2	0	1	0
10	FW	(England) ENG	Richard Walker	31	4	24	4	4	0	2	0	1	0
19	FW	(England) ENG	Sean Rigg	38	1	31	1	5	0	1	0	1	0
27	FW	(England) ENG	Matt Groves	2	0	1	0	1	0	0	0	0	0
29	FW	(Wales) WAL	Josh Klein-Davies	10	1	10	1	0	0	0	0	0	0
34	FW	(England) ENG	James Fraser	0	0	0	0	0	0	0	0	0	0

=== Goalscorers ===
Name	League	Cup	Total
Rickie Lambert	13	6	19
Craig Disley	6	3	9
Andy Williams	5	2	7
Craig Hinton	2	3	5
Richard Walker	4	0	4
Steve Elliott	4	0	4
Danny Coles	1	2	3
Chris Lines	2	0	2
David Pipe	2	0	2
Byron Anthony	1	0	1
Lewis Haldane	1	0	1
Joe Jacobson	1	0	1
Josh Klein-Davies	1	0	1
Sean Rigg	1	0	1
Own goals	1	0	1

=== Discipline ===
Name	Red cards	Yellow cards
Richard Walker	1	3
Steve Elliott	1	0
Stuart Campbell	0	8
Craig Disley	0	7
Joe Jacobson	0	7
Lewis Haldane	0	6
Chris Carruthers	0	5
Steve Phillips	0	4
Danny Coles	0	3
Ryan Green	0	3
Craig Hinton	0	3
Aaron Lescott	0	3
Byron Anthony	0	2
Rickie Lambert	0	1
Chris Lines	0	1
David Pipe	0	1
Anthony Pulis	0	1
Andy Williams	0	1
Total:	2	59

=== Transfers ===
==== In ====
During the 2007–08 season, Rovers signed six new players. Joe Jacobson, David Pipe, Andy Williams, Danny Coles, James Fraser and Jeff Hughes. The total transfer spending for the season is not known, as the Williams and Hughes transfer fees have not been disclosed, however both are known to be "six-figure" sums so the total spending is over £250,000.

Date	Player	Previous club	Contract	Cost
5 July	(Wales) Joe Jacobson	Cardiff City	3 years	Free
5 July	(England) Andy Williams	Hereford United	3 years	Undisclosed
10 July	(Wales) David Pipe	Notts County	3 years	£50,000
14 August	(England) James Fraser	Worthing	6 months	Free
1 November	(England) Danny Coles	Hull City	3 months	Loan
8 January	(England) Danny Coles	Hull City	2½ years	Undisclosed
8 February	(Wales) Anthony Pulis	Stoke City	3 months	Loan
27 March	(England) Wayne Andrews	Coventry City	2 months	Loan
27 March	(Northern Ireland) Jeff Hughes	Crystal Palace	2 months	Loan
6 June	(Northern Ireland) Jeff Hughes	Crystal Palace	3 years	£120,000

==== Out ====
Date	Player	New Club	Contract	Cost
17 August	(England) Andy Sandell	Salisbury City	1 month	Loan
17 August	(England) James Palmer	Tiverton Town	1 month	Loan
31 August	(England) Andy Sandell	Salisbury City	3 years	Undisclosed
10 November	(England) James Palmer	Weston-super-Mare		Released
16 November	(Wales) Josh Klein-Davies	Yate Town	1 month	Loan
28 December	(England) James Fraser	Tiverton Town	3 months	Loan
10 March	(England) Matt Groves	Chippenham Town	2 months	Loan
30 June	(England) Chris Carruthers	Oxford United		Released
30 June	(England) Sammy Igoe	AFC Bournemouth	1 year	Released
30 June	(England) Tom Godsell			Released
30 June	(Wales) Ryan Paddock	Weston-super-Mare	Unknown	Released

In addition to the players listed above, coach Kevin Hodges was released by the club at the end of the season.

== Team kit ==
The team kit for the 2007–08 season is produced by Erreà. The main shirt sponsor is Cowlin Construction and the secondary shirt sponsor is Blackthorn Cider. The home shirt features the traditional blue and white quarters in a darker shade of blue from the previous season, and the away kit is green with black trim.

2007–08 home colours	2007–08 away colours
