= Scottish Schools Curling Championship =

Curling competition in Scotland

- Established: 1967
- 2021 host city: Ayr
- 2021 arena: Ayr Curling Club
- 2020 champion: Orrin Carson; Dalbeattie High School, Dalbeattie

The Scottish Schools Curling Championship is an annual curling competition held to determine the best school curling team in Scotland.

The current champions are Kelso High School, who defeated a team from St. Joseph's College in the final on 10 March 2019.

== Previous winners ==
A list of previous School Champions:

Scottish Schools Curling Champions
| | Winners | | Runners-up | |
| Year | School | Team | School | Team |
|---|---|---|---|---|
| 1967 | Hutchesons' Grammar School | Campbell Dick; Robin Gemmell; Alex Jamieson; Alistair Anderson | The High School of Glasgow | Neil Turner; Hamish MacKay; David Hunter; David Elliott |
| 1968 | George Watson's College | Colin Baxter; Jimmy Hunter; Peter Welsh; Arthur Hendry | George Heriot's School | Archie Ballantyne; Gordon Wilson; Douglas Arnet; Ross Millar |
| 1969 | George Watson's College | Colin Baxter; Peter Welsh; Donald Crerar; Arthur Hendry | Kingussie High School | John Fraser; Kit Fraser; George Fraser; Simon South |
| 1970 | Hutchesons' Grammar School | Graeme Adam; Brian Alderman; Alistair Govan; John Brown | Lockerbie Academy | Duncan Greig; Alastair Grieg; Alan Hunter; Keith Hunter |
| 1971 | Hutchesons' Grammar School | Graeme Adam; Brian Alderman; Alistair Govan; John Brown | George Heriot's School | Bob Martin; Lindsay Scotland Brian Clark David Auld |
| 1972 | Hutchesons' Grammar School | Brian Alderman; Alistair Govan; Ian Webster; John Brown | George Heriot's School | Mark Smith; Ronnie Brock; James Cowan; Graham Tait |
| 1973 | George Heriot's School | Mark Smith; Ronnie Brock; James Cowan; Graham Tait | Lanark Grammar | Lockhart Steele; Tom McGregor Jr; Helen Steele; Douglas Carruthers |
| 1974 | Hutchesons' Grammar School | Ken Horton; Willie Jamieson; Keith Douglas; Graham Govan | Kingussie High School | Simon South; John Russell; Kenneth Mackintosh; Jonathan South |
| 1975 | Lockerbie Academy | Neil Gibson; Andrew Campbell; Garry Smith; Robert Jardine | Hutchesons' Grammar School | Willie Jamieson; John Pearson; John Kerr; Stewart Gilmour |
| 1976 | Kingussie High School | John Russell; Jonathan South; David Miller; Robert Byiers | Stranraer Academy | Andrew McQuistin; Neale McQuistin; John Sharp; Helen Wallace |
| 1977 | Stranraer Academy | John Sharp; Hugh Aitken; Peter Wilson; Helen Wallace | Kingussie High School | John Russell; Jonty South; David Miller; Stewart Dryburgh |
| 1978 | George Watson's College | Norman Brown; Geoffrey Smith; Martin Turner; David Ansell | Kingussie High School | John Russell; Jonty South; David Miller; David Gray |
| 1979 | Perth High School | David Hay; Mike Hay; Sandy Hay; John Thompson | Kingussie High School | Jonty South; Stewart Dryburgh; Peter Grant; Ailsa Russell |
| 1980 | Perth High School | David Hay; Mike Hay; Sandy Hay; Kenneth Farquharson | Stranraer Academy | Stuart Wilson; Murray McWilliam; Philip Wilson; Hugh Kilpatrcik |
| 1981 | Perth Academy | Russell Keiller; Peter Smith; Stephen Edwards; David Longmuir | Kirkcaldy High School | Stewart Dryburgh; Douglas Dryburgh; Garry Nicol; Scott Johnston |
| 1982 | George Watson's College | David Aitken; David Imlah; Martin Wragg; Alan Davidson | Kirkcaldy High School | Douglas Dryburgh; Barrie Gilmour |
| 1983 | Hutchesons' Grammar School | Keith Letton; John Kennedy; John Laird; Graeme McFarlane | Kirkcaldy High School | Douglas Dryburgh |
| 1984 | Inverness Royal Academy | Graham McKenna; Alan Baikie; John Munro; Mark Fraser | Auchterarder High School | Ian Watt; Richard Dickson; Graham Marchbank; Lindsay Pithers |
| 1985 | Breadalbane Academy | Alistair Scott; Derek Smith; Douglas Scott; Alistair Hay | Millburn Academy | Neil Potter; Iain Cormack; Dianne Lyle; Jane Calder |
| 1986 | Pitlochry High School | Simon Hartley; Neil MacDonald; Andrew Todd; Andrew Penker | Lockerbie Academy | Robert Paterson; Daniel Rudd; Jamie Strawhorn; Julia Halliday |
| 1987 | Perth Academy | Graeme Connal; Alison Milne; Alison Smith; Mark Brass | Breadalbane Academy | Douglas Scott; Andrew Todd; Paul Garden; Andrew Penker |
| 1988 | Breadalbane Academy | Simon Hartley; Gordon Hay; Andrew Penker; Hilary Leckie | Marr College | Struan Macnee; Ross McDonald; Craig Barton; David Trueman |
| 1989 | Breadalbane Academy | Simon Hartley; Gordon Hay; Michael Hartley; Neil Kemp | Lockerbie Academy | Craig Wilson; Richard Burnett; Craig Strawhorn; Keith Carlyle |
| 1990 | McLaren High School | Christopher Hildrey; Martyn Steedman; Peter Reilly; Forbes Sinclair | Johnstone High | Colin Beckett; Fiona Brown; Fiona MacFarlane; Cassey Paterson |
| 1991 | Lockerbie Academy | Craig Wilson; Richard Burnett; Keith Carlyle; Jennifer Fountain | Stranraer Academy | Willie Lyburn; Frazer Hare; Andrew Ross; Gary McMeachan |
| 1992 | Kingussie High School | James Dryburgh; Rory Simpson; Scott Gilbert; Ewan Mason | Gryffe High School | Nairn Robertson; Lorna Rettig; Lynn Taggart; David Elder |
| 1993 | Millburn Academy | Martin McKendrick; Iain Gordon; Tim MacIntyre; Neil MacIntosh | Kelvinside Academy | Mark Hamilton; Scott Crawford; Mark Duguid; Ramsay Muirhead |
| 1994 | Stewarton Academy | Brian Smith; Neil Wilson; Stuart Smith; Alasdair Smith | Forfar Academy | Richard Tasker; Louise Tasker; Iain Kilgour; Steve Warden |
| 1995 | Lockerbie Academy | Mark Alder; Russell Smith; Gavin Fleming; David Edwards | Stewarton Academy | Alasdair Smith; Malcolm Noble; David Shephard; John Craig |
| 1996 | Stranraer Academy | Tom Buchanan; Scott McColm; Lyndsay Cumming; Kirsty Harrison | Strathaven Academy | Iain Stobo; Stuart Raeburn; Craig Martin; Brian Greenock |
| 1997 | Lockerbie Academy | Gavin Fleming; Adam Hyslop; Russell Smith; David Edwards | Stranraer Academy | Tom Buchanan; Scott McColm; Lyndsay Cumming; Ross McColm |
| 1998 | Morrison's Academy | Peter McLaren; Hugh Mickel; Murray McGregor; Stuart Cameron | Webster's High School | Alan Waddell; Graham Smith; Hugh Thompson; Vivien Ogilvy |
| 1999 | Garnock Academy | Craig Reid; Alexander Fulton; Sarah Reid; Nicola Munro | Breadalbane Academy | Craig McKenzie; Steven Hausrath; Malcolm Burrell; Guy Hailey |
| 2000 | Morrison's Academy | Murray McGregor; Stuart Cameron; Kirsteen Weir; Richard Haggart | Breadalbane Academy | Malcolm Burrell; Keith Duncan Miller; Kenneth Campbell; Callum Buchan |
| 2001 | Balfron High School | Logan Gray; Fraser Easton; David McEwan; Gordon McDougall | Lockerbie Academy | Scott Hamilton; Gareth Owen; David Morton; Alan Spence |
| 2002 | Stranraer Academy | John Wilson; Iain Chalmers; Michael McColm; Angus Wemyss | Lockerbie Academy | Scott Hamilton |
| 2003 | Park Mains High School | Alasdair Guthrie; Jennifer Morrison; Colin Anderson; Paul Darroch | Lockerbie Academy | Robert Hamilton; Sandy Smith; Linsey Spence; Katie Stevenson |
| 2004 | Currie Community High School | Kerry Barr; David Copland; Steven Kennedy; Ann Barr | Forfar Academy | Greg Drummond; Marie Callander; Kerr Drummond; Roy Nicoll |
| 2005 | Stewart's Melville College | Jamie Dick; Colin Dick; Struan Wood; Andrew Young | Stirling High School | James Dunn; Michael Goodfellow; Kirsty Stevenson; Cathrine Johnston |
| 2006 | Lockerbie Academy | Claire Hamilton; Anna Sloan; Megan Priestley; Hannah Fleming | Stewart's Melville College | Jamie Dick; Colin Dick; Struan Wood; Andrew Young |
| 2007 | Lockerbie Academy | Graeme Black; Anna Sloan; Robert McBride; Thomas Sloan | Forfar Academy | Kerr Drummond; Murray Young; Julia Callander; Andrew Callander |
| 2008 | Stewart's Melville College | Colin Dick; Struan Wood; Douglas Burns; Jonathan Irwin | Fortrose Academy | Peter McIntyre; Scott Fraser; Jamie Fraser; Neil Paul |
| 2009 | Lockerbie Academy | Hannah Fleming; Kimberley Smith; Alice Spence; Kirsten McNay | Garnock Academy | Gavin Reid; Greg Matthew; Stuart Marshall; Fraser Keil |
| 2010 | Merchiston Castle | Grant Hardie; Hamilton McMillan; Alastair Brunton; Mark Munro | Arbroath High School | Duncan Menzies; Robert Fawns; Alistair Stewart; Angus Dowall |
| 2011 | Arbroath High School | Duncan Menzies; Robert Fawns; Angus Dowall; Thomas Halder | Millburn Academy | Calum Greenwood; Ryan Peters; Stewart Lyle; Thomas Willis |
| 2012 | George Heriot's School | Bruce Mouat; Rowena Kerr; Daneel Miney; Andrew McGowan | Arbroath High School | Robert Fawns; Thomas Halder; Ben Bremner; Craig Cameron |
| 2013 | Kelso High School | Cameron Bryce; Neil Sutherland; Amy Bryce; Callum Potts | Stranraer Academy | Bobby Lammie; Neil Topping; Euan Kyle; Stewart Kyle |
| 2014 | Lockerbie Academy | Cameron McNay; Ryan McCormick; Matthew Reive; Angus Naysmith | | |
| 2015 | Stranraer Academy | Stewart Kyle; Euan Kyle; Katie McMillan; Brendan Todd | | |
| 2016 | Perth Academy | Callum Kinnear; Mili Smith; Angus Martin; Connor Willie-Milne | | |
| 2017 | Perth High School | Duncan McFadzean; Leeanne McKenzie; Matthew McKenzie; Cameron Paterson | | |
| 2018 | Saint Joseph's College | Scott Hyslop; Nevin Harmjanz; Jack Carrick; Finlay Kennedy | Kelso High School | Angus Bryce; Joanna Sutherland; Kyle McLean; Callum McLean |
| 2019 | Kelso High School | Angus Bryce; Joanna Sutherland; Kyle McLean; Callum McLean | St. Joseph's College | Scott Hyslop; Nevin Harmjanz; Jack Carrick; Finlay Kennedy |
| 2020 | Dalbeattie High School | Orrin Carson; Struan Carson; Hannah Farries; Kirsty Farries | | |

== See also ==
- Scottish Men's Curling Championship
- Scottish Women's Curling Championship
- Scottish Mixed Curling Championship
- Scottish Mixed Doubles Curling Championship
- Scottish Junior Curling Championships
- Scottish Senior Curling Championships
- Scottish Wheelchair Curling Championship
