= Danny Bhoy =

Scottish comedian

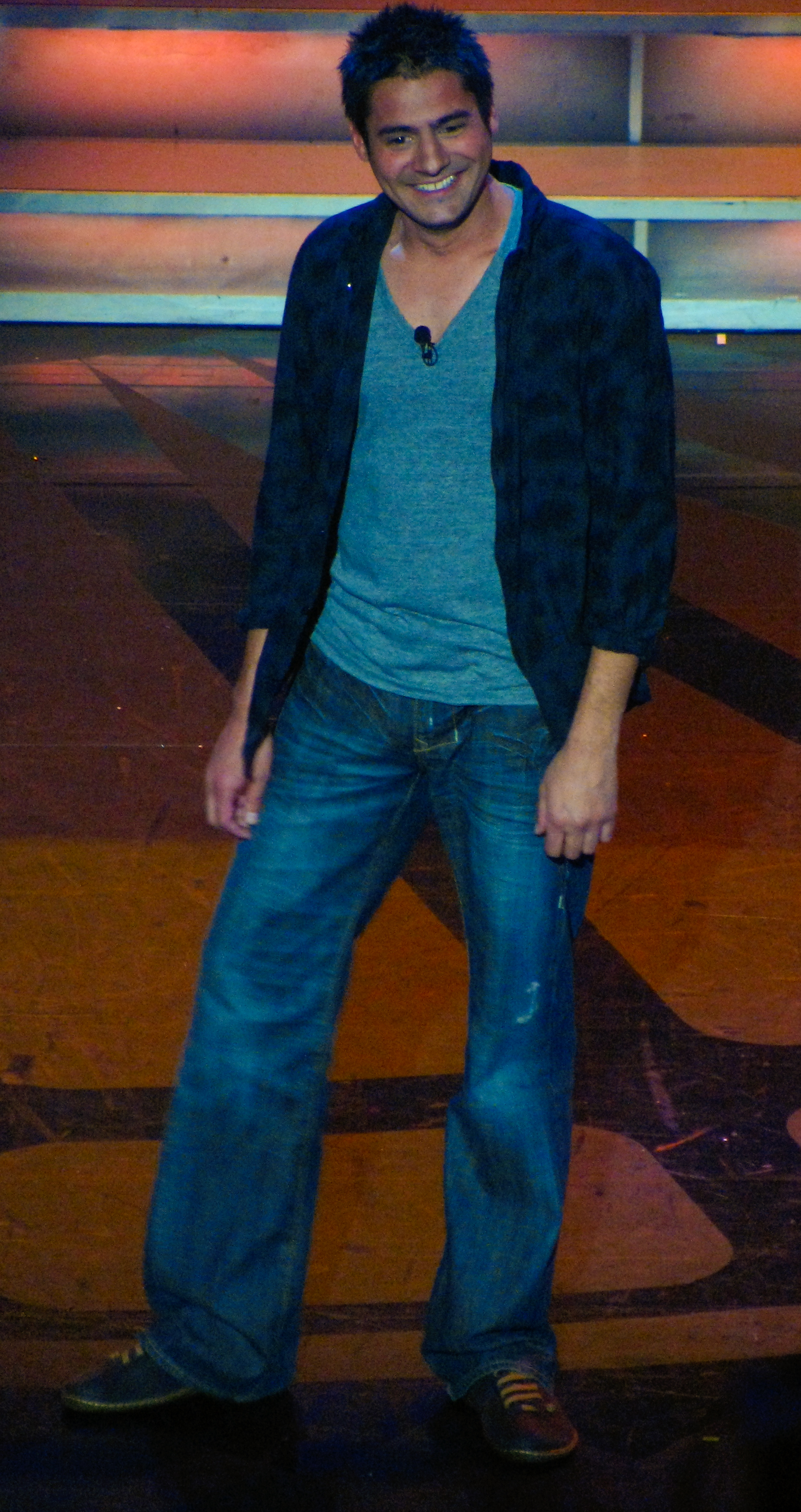
- Danny Bhoy at the Just for Laughs Festival Montreal 2009
- Born: Danni Chaudhry; 16 January 1975 (age 51); Moffat, Dumfriesshire, Scotland
- Education: Moffat Academy; Lockerbie Academy; Merchiston Castle School; University of Glasgow

Comedy career
- Years active: 1998–present
- Genre: Observational comedy
- Subjects: Scottish culture, storytelling
- Website: dannybhoy.com

Danny Bhoy (born Danni Chaudhry on 16 January 1975) is a Scottish comedian who has performed in the United Kingdom, New Zealand, Australia, Canada, Sweden, and the United States.

== Early life ==
Bhoy was born in Moffat, Scotland, as one of four children. Danny attended Moffat Academy, Lockerbie Academy and Merchiston Castle School in Edinburgh and studied history at the University of Glasgow. His father is of Indian descent and his mother is Scottish.

His humour is observational, often involving his own personal experiences as an international comedian. While he does mention his Indian heritage, his shows centre on Scottish social patterns. Despite his stage name, Bhoy, he is not a Celtic F.C. fan (Celtic are nicknamed The Bhoys); his favourite team is in fact Newcastle United. His stage name stems from his grandma's nickname for him, Danny Boy, but due to a performing dog already having that name registered with Equity, he added the H to Bhoy.

== Career ==
Bhoy began stand up in 1998 after going to see his first comedy show at the Edinburgh Festival. A year later, he won The Daily Telegraph Open Mic Award, one of Britain's biggest competitions for comedy newcomers. In 2001, Danny took his first full-length solo show to the Edinburgh Festival, where, within a week, he had sold out his entire three-week run, and added extra shows to cope with the demand for tickets. By the spring of 2003, Danny's comedy started to take a different direction. That year he also entered the Australian comedy market, with his first solo show at the invitation-only Melbourne Comedy Festival. This led to various Australian TV appearances on Rove Live, The Glass House, and the Melbourne International Comedy Festival Gala. In November of that year, Danny was invited to perform on the Royal Variety Show.

In 2005, Danny was invited to take part in the Montreal Just for Laughs Comedy Festival, where the Montreal Gazette described him as "the stand out hit of the festival". In November, Danny was invited to take part in the inaugural Las Vegas Comedy Festival. Bhoy toured Australia in 2007, ending his tour at the Sydney Opera House, and 2009 with the last show at His Majesty's Theatre, Perth. Bhoy appeared on the Late Show with David Letterman, broadcast on 5 March 2010, and the Comedy Network's "Saturday Night Stand-up", which was broadcast on 17 April 2010. He appeared on Comedy Central with his new routine, "Subject to Change: Danny Bhoy", which was broadcast on 22 May 2010, and appeared on Live at the Apollo, broadcast in December 2010.

In early 2011, Danny began touring Australia with his show Messenger (Please Do Not Shoot), selling out his shows at the Sydney Comedy Festival. He also sold out all his performances at the Melbourne Comedy Festival, and had to add two additional shows at a different venue due to popular demand, both of which also sold out. Bhoy's 2012 show, Dear Epson, was loosely centred upon a series of letters to well-known companies. He toured the show following a run at the Edinburgh Fringe.

== Stand-up DVDs ==
- Live at the Sydney Opera House (15 August 2007)
- Live at the Athenaeum (5 August 2009)
- Subject to Change (8 November 2010) [performed live in Montreal, Quebec, Canada]
- Live at the Festival Theatre (26 November 2012)
