= Holm Park, Moffat =

Sports park in Moffat, Scotland

Holm Park
- The Holm
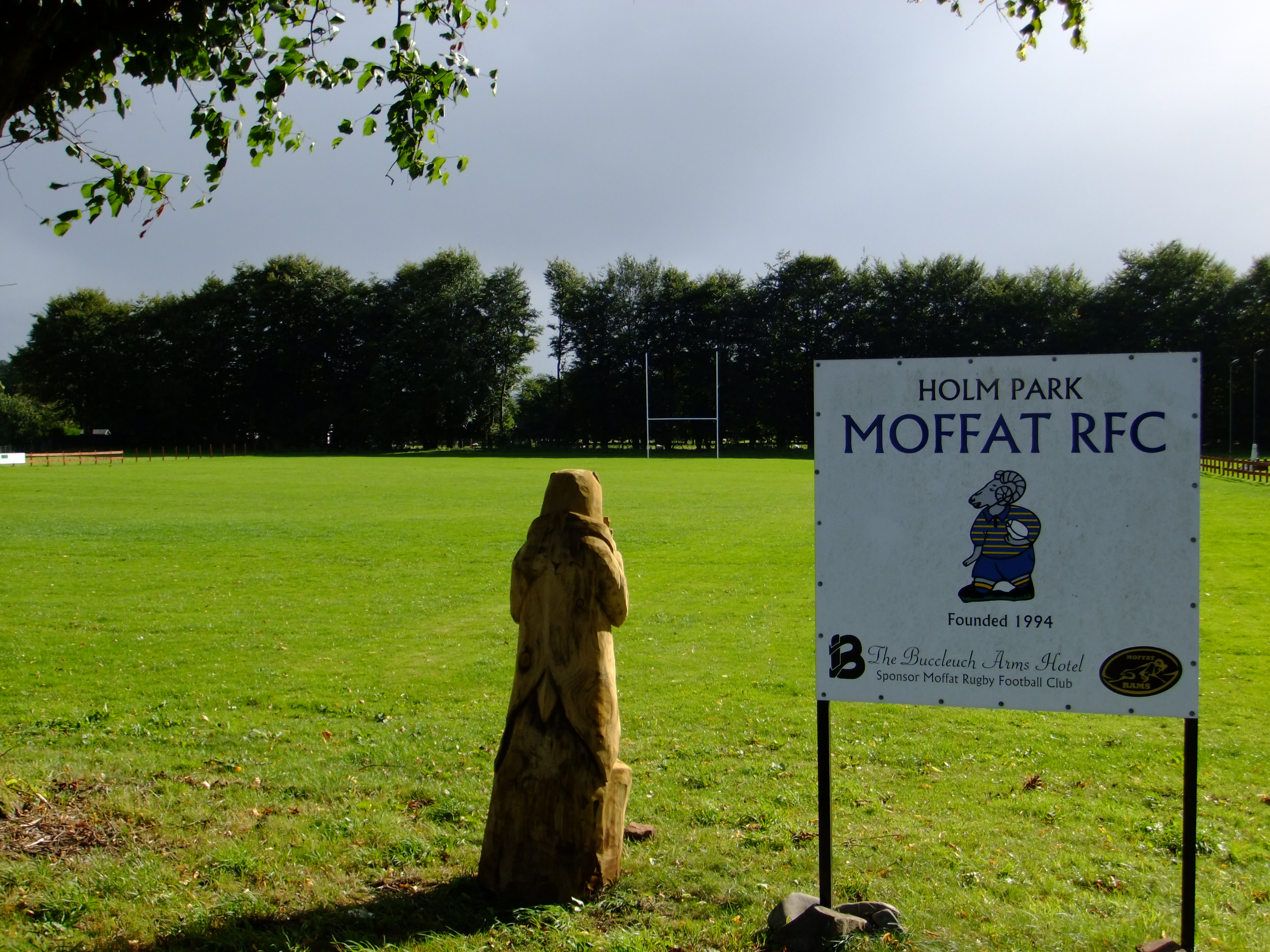
- Interactive map of Holm Park
- Location: Moffat
- Coordinates: 55°19′50.43″N 3°26′6.96″W
- Owner: Moffat RFC
- Capacity: 1,000
- Surface: Grass

Construction
- Built: 2001
- Opened: 2001

Tenants
- Moffat RFC; Upper Annandale F.C. 2014–present Moffat Thistle 2010 A.F.C. 2014–present

Holm Park (known as The Holm by locals) is a sports park located in Moffat.

== Overview ==
Holm Park is located on the Holm End side of Moffat, near the New Moffat Academy. It is the home of Scottish Rugby Union side Moffat RFC. The ground contains the club's changing facilities and floodlit training and playing pitches.

== History ==
The pitch was once the playing field for one of the local private schools as was the field where the current schools playing fields are located. After the school closed the ground was used by the local cricket team until it ceased to exist leaving only the pavilion on the academy's side of the field as the only evidence of its former use. After that the grounds were used as farmland until the rugby club was formed in the mid-1990s.

== Future ==
The club is currently looking to have the facilities improved by building onto the current pavilion structure creating additional changing rooms, Gym, physio room and function room.

The club are also looking into having a 3G or 4G Artificial turf laid replacing the existing grass surface, allowing all year training and playing at Holm Park and allow local football teams to use the pitch when available.

== Football Usage ==
=== Upper Annandale F.C. ===
As part of Upper Annandale F.C. applied for entry into the South of Scotland Football League their traditional home wasn't deemed suitable, so they had to relocate to the pitches at the newly built Moffat Academy. The club required a place to store its equipment and approached the rugby club to place a small storage container on the ground and the school had a gate fitted between the two grounds to allow easy access.

=== Moffat Thistle 2010 A.F.C. ===
Sunday Amateur League Moffat Thistle 2010 A.F.C. side on occasion use the changing facilities on a Sunday when playing at the Moffat Academy Pitches.
