= List of listed buildings in Moffat, Dumfries and Galloway =

This is a list of listed buildings in the civil parish of Moffat in Dumfries and Galloway, Scotland.

== List ==
Name	Location	Date listed	Grid ref. (Note: Sometimes known as OSGB36, the grid reference (where provided) is based on the British national grid reference system used by the Ordnance Survey. • "Guide to National Grid". Ordnance Survey. • "Get-a-map". Ordnance Survey.)	Geo-coordinates	Notes	LB number (Note: Historic Environment Scotland assign a unique alphanumeric identifier to each designated site in Scotland, for listed buildings this always begins with "LB", for example "LB12345".)	Image
20 Well Road Strathview (North Side)				55°20′01″N 3°26′24″W	Category B	37943	Upload Photo
Well Road Floral Cottage And Briary Cottage (North Side)				55°20′05″N 3°26′14″W	Category B	37946	Upload Photo
11-13 (Odd) Well Street				55°19′59″N 3°26′35″W	Category C(S)	37950	Upload Photo
27, 29 Well Street				55°19′59″N 3°26′33″W	Category C(S)	37953	Upload Photo
Academy Road, St Mary's Uf Church				55°20′07″N 3°26′42″W	Category B	37857	Upload Photo
Academy Road, Stratford House				55°20′05″N 3°26′43″W	Category C(S)	37858	Upload Photo
5 Beechgrove				55°20′12″N 3°26′48″W	Category C(S)	37866	Upload Photo
Born Side, St John's Episcopal Church				55°19′57″N 3°26′28″W	Category B	37879	Upload Photo
High Street Raven's Neuk				55°20′03″N 3°26′43″W	Category C(S)	37903	Upload Photo
High Street, Ram Lodge And Centra				55°20′01″N 3°26′39″W	Category C(S)	37907	Upload Photo
High Street Bonnington Hotel				55°19′59″N 3°26′38″W	Category B	37911	Upload Photo
High Street Old Court House				55°19′58″N 3°26′37″W	Category B	37912	Upload Photo
High Street, Old Parish Churchyard				55°19′56″N 3°26′33″W	Category C(S)	37917	Upload Photo
4 High Street The Coachman				55°19′59″N 3°26′40″W	Category B	37921	Upload Photo
Victoria Place Larch-Hill House				55°20′08″N 3°26′33″W	Category B	37937	Upload Photo
Well Road, Mill Cottage (South Side)				55°20′01″N 3°26′17″W	Category C(S)	37939	Upload Photo
Breckonside Tower				55°18′21″N 3°24′24″W	Category C(S)	16848	Upload Photo
Granton House, Balustrade To South And Gatepiers				55°22′28″N 3°27′43″W	Category A	16858	Upload Photo
Holehouse Linn Bridge				55°21′48″N 3°28′41″W	Category B	16860	Upload Photo
Ballplay Road Wellview				55°20′00″N 3°25′54″W	Category C(S)	37862	Upload Photo
7 Beechgrove Roseneath				55°20′13″N 3°26′48″W	Category C(S)	37868	Upload Photo
9 And 10 (Hillview) Beechgrove				55°20′14″N 3°26′49″W	Category C(S)	37870	Upload Photo
14 Beechgrove Rockhill				55°20′15″N 3°26′51″W	Category C(S)	37874	Upload Photo
17 Beechgrove Springfield				55°20′16″N 3°26′52″W	Category C(S)	37876	Upload Photo
Church View, Church Gate				55°19′55″N 3°26′38″W	Category C(S)	37885	Upload Photo
7 Church Street				55°19′58″N 3°26′41″W	Category C(S)	37888	Upload Photo
Eastgate, Limetree House				55°20′01″N 3°26′35″W	Category B	37889	Upload Photo
High Street Balmoral Hotel (Former Spur Inn)				55°20′00″N 3°26′39″W	Category B	37909	Upload Photo
High Street Buccleuch Arms				55°19′57″N 3°26′40″W	Category B	37922	Upload Photo
High Street Annandale Arms Hotel				55°19′59″N 3°26′41″W	Category B	37926	Upload Photo
Mansfield Place, Proudfoot Institute				55°19′58″N 3°26′32″W	Category B	37929	Upload Photo
Old Well Road Park Cottage				55°20′05″N 3°26′29″W	Category B	37931	Upload Photo
School Lane Kirkland House				55°20′02″N 3°26′27″W	Category B	37933	Upload Photo
Dumcrieff Bridge				55°18′57″N 3°25′12″W	Category C(S)	16855	Upload Photo
Heatheryhaugh, Garden Bridge				55°20′30″N 3°25′56″W	Category B	16862	Upload Photo
New Bridge (Formerly A701 Over River Annan)				55°20′13″N 3°27′11″W	Category C(S)	16866	Upload Photo
Well Road Millbank (North Side)				55°20′06″N 3°26′06″W	Category C(S)	37947	Upload Photo
Academy Road, 1 Stanley Place, Kirkview And Archbald Moffatt House (Formerly 2 Stanley Place)				55°20′07″N 3°26′45″W	Category B	37861	Upload Photo
Ballplay Road Dunmore Villa				55°19′59″N 3°25′53″W	Category B	37863	Upload Photo
Eastgate Summerlea House				55°20′03″N 3°26′39″W	Category C(S)	37891	Upload Photo
Eastgate St Ninian's Prep School				55°20′03″N 3°26′32″W	Category C(S)	37894	Upload Photo
Glendyne Hartfell Crescent				55°20′12″N 3°26′23″W	Category B	37897	Upload Photo
Haywood Road Hunter's Croft				55°20′08″N 3°26′04″W	Category C(S)	37898	Upload Photo
Haywood Road, Merlewood				55°20′12″N 3°26′08″W	Category B	37899	Upload Photo
High Street Ivy House				55°20′02″N 3°26′40″W	Category C(S)	37905	Upload another image
High Street, Moffat Post Office				55°20′01″N 3°26′39″W	Category C(S)	37908	Upload Photo
High Street, Spar With 1-5 Well Street				55°19′58″N 3°26′37″W	Category B	37913	Upload Photo
High Street, The Tartan Gift Shop And 2 Holm Street				55°19′56″N 3°26′37″W	Category C(S)	37918	Upload Photo
Archbank Bridge				55°20′48″N 3°25′57″W	Category B	16846	Upload Photo
Archbank Farm, Tall Barn With Waterwheel				55°20′48″N 3°26′06″W	Category A	16847	Upload Photo
Meikleholmside Bridge				55°21′50″N 3°27′54″W	Category C(S)	16864	Upload Photo
Academy Road, Seamore House				55°20′05″N 3°26′44″W	Category C(S)	37860	Upload Photo
Ballplay Road, Holm Park, Former St Kiernan's School And Gatepiers				55°19′56″N 3°25′55″W	Category B	37864	Upload Photo
3 And 4 Beechgrove				55°20′12″N 3°26′47″W	Category C(S)	37865	Upload Photo
12 Beechgrove				55°20′14″N 3°26′50″W	Category C(S)	37872	Upload Photo
18 Beechgrove				55°20′16″N 3°26′52″W	Category C(S)	37877	Upload Photo
20 Beechgrove				55°20′17″N 3°26′53″W	Category B	37878	Upload Photo
Eastgate, Limetree Cottage				55°20′02″N 3°26′37″W	Category C(S)	37890	Upload Photo
Eastgate Victoria And Upper Victoria House And Victoria Place				55°20′04″N 3°26′40″W	Category C(S)	37892	Upload Photo
High Street Ram Fountain				55°20′01″N 3°26′41″W	Category B	37902	Upload Photo
6 High Street R Little's Premises				55°19′58″N 3°26′39″W	Category B	37924	Upload Photo
School Lane Southview				55°20′03″N 3°26′25″W	Category B	37934	Upload Photo
Heatheryhaugh				55°20′31″N 3°25′57″W	Category A	16861	Upload Photo
Well Road, Oak Tree Cottage, Rose Cottage (North Side)				55°20′02″N 3°26′19″W	Category C(S)	37945	Upload Photo
7 And 9 Well Street (7 Trustee Savings Bank)				55°19′58″N 3°26′36″W	Category C(S)	37949	Upload Photo
8 Beechgrove Holmbury				55°20′13″N 3°26′49″W	Category C(S)	37869	Upload Photo
Mrs Crichton's House, Chapel Street				55°19′59″N 3°26′33″W	Category B	37880	Upload Photo
Churchgate Black Bull Hotel				55°19′54″N 3°26′38″W	Category B	37883	Upload Photo
5 Church Street				55°19′58″N 3°26′41″W	Category C(S)	37887	Upload Photo
High Street Moffat Weavers Tweed Shop				55°20′00″N 3°26′38″W	Category C(S)	37910	Upload Photo
High Street Forestry Commission Premises				55°19′57″N 3°26′36″W	Category C(S)	37916	Upload Photo
1-3 (Consec) High Street				55°19′56″N 3°26′39″W	Category C(S)	37920	Upload Photo
High Street Town Hall And Police Station				55°20′00″N 3°26′42″W	Category B	37927	Upload another image
Craigieburn, Stables				55°20′05″N 3°23′38″W	Category C(S)	16852	Upload Photo
Corehead Farm, Bught (Sheep Fank) At Devil's Beeftub				55°24′03″N 3°28′49″W	Category B	16854	Upload Photo
Heatheryhaugh, Former Stables And Gatepiers				55°20′32″N 3°25′57″W	Category B	16863	Upload Photo
Academy Road, Moffat Academy				55°20′10″N 3°26′44″W	Category C(S)	50153	Upload Photo
Station Park, Timber Pavilion				55°19′46″N 3°26′41″W	Category C(S)	51589	Upload Photo
Well Road, Southfield (North Side)				55°20′01″N 3°26′23″W	Category C(S)	37944	Upload Photo
15, 17 Well Street, The Duka				55°19′59″N 3°26′34″W	Category B	37951	Upload Photo
Academy Road, Hopetoun House				55°20′06″N 3°26′45″W	Category B	37859	Upload Photo
6 Beechgrove Del Mar				55°20′13″N 3°26′48″W	Category C(S)	37867	Upload Photo
11 Beechgrove				55°20′14″N 3°26′50″W	Category C(S)	37871	Upload Photo
Hartfell Crescent Claremont And Westwood				55°20′11″N 3°26′27″W	Category B	37895	Upload Photo
Hartfell House Hartfell Crescent				55°20′12″N 3°26′25″W	Category B	37896	Upload Photo
5 High Street Moffat Sports Centre				55°19′57″N 3°26′39″W	Category C(S)	37923	Upload Photo
High Street Moffat House Hotel				55°20′02″N 3°26′46″W	Category A	37928	Upload another image
Sidmount Avenue Sidmount Cottage				55°20′08″N 3°26′12″W	Category A	37935	Upload Photo
Well Road, Lauchope Lodge				55°20′12″N 3°26′03″W	Category C(S)	37948	Upload Photo
25 Well Street				55°19′59″N 3°26′34″W	Category B	37952	Upload Photo
13 Beechgrove Buchan House				55°20′15″N 3°26′50″W	Category B	37873	Upload Photo
Church Gate St Andrew's Parish Church Manse				55°19′53″N 3°26′42″W	Category B	37882	Upload Photo
Church Gate Harthope House				55°19′55″N 3°26′38″W	Category B	37884	Upload Photo
3 Church Street				55°19′58″N 3°26′41″W	Category B	37886	Upload Photo
Eastgate Albert House				55°20′05″N 3°26′42″W	Category C(S)	37893	Upload Photo
Haywood Road Woodlands				55°20′12″N 3°26′06″W	Category B	37901	Upload Photo
High Street Arden House				55°20′03″N 3°26′42″W	Category B	37904	Upload Photo
High Street 4 Bath Place				55°20′02″N 3°26′40″W	Category B	37906	Upload Photo
Well Road, Burnock Lodge (East Side)				55°20′18″N 3°26′00″W	Category B	37941	Upload Photo
23 Well Road (North Side)				55°20′00″N 3°26′26″W	Category C(S)	37942	Upload Photo
Craigieburn Hermitage				55°20′02″N 3°23′48″W	Category C(S)	16850	Upload Photo
Crofthead Farmhouse And Steading				55°20′01″N 3°23′03″W	Category C(S)	16853	Upload Photo
Dumcrieff House				55°19′06″N 3°25′00″W	Category B	16856	Upload Photo
Moffat Well				55°21′01″N 3°25′58″W	Category B	16865	Upload Photo
16 Beechgrove				55°20′16″N 3°26′52″W	Category C(S)	37875	Upload Photo
Churchgate St Andrew's Parish Church				55°19′54″N 3°26′41″W	Category A	37881	Upload another image See more images
Haywood Road North Park				55°20′14″N 3°26′04″W	Category B	37900	Upload Photo
High Street Star Hotel				55°19′58″N 3°26′37″W	Category C(S)	37914	Upload Photo
High Street J Hyslop And Co Premises				55°19′57″N 3°26′37″W	Category B	37915	Upload Photo
High Street, Bank Of Scotland				55°19′56″N 3°26′38″W	Category C(S)	37919	Upload Photo
9 High Street, Gemini Jewellers				55°19′58″N 3°26′40″W	Category C(S)	37925	Upload Photo
Old Well Road, Alma And 1 Well Road				55°20′01″N 3°26′31″W	Category C(S)	37930	Upload Photo
Old Well Road Davington House				55°20′05″N 3°26′29″W	Category C(S)	37932	Upload Photo
Star Street Range Of Cottages To Rear Of Star Inn				55°19′58″N 3°26′35″W	Category C(S)	37936	Upload Photo
2 Well Road Park House (South Side)				55°20′00″N 3°26′31″W	Category B	37938	Upload Photo
Well Road Burnside (South Side)				55°20′05″N 3°26′03″W	Category B	37940	Upload Photo
Craigieburn House				55°20′06″N 3°23′43″W	Category B	16849	Upload Photo
Craigieburn, Lodge And Gatepiers				55°19′59″N 3°23′40″W	Category C(S)	16851	Upload Photo

== Key ==
The scheme for classifying buildings in Scotland is:

- Category A: "buildings of national or international importance, either architectural or historic; or fine, little-altered examples of some particular period, style or building type."
- Category B: "buildings of regional or more than local importance; or major examples of some particular period, style or building type, which may have been altered."
- Category C: "buildings of local importance; lesser examples of any period, style, or building type, as originally constructed or moderately altered; and simple traditional buildings which group well with other listed buildings."

In March 2016 there were 47,288 listed buildings in Scotland. Of these, 8% were Category A, and 50% were Category B, with the remaining 42% being Category C.
