= Kirkpatrick-Juxta =

Parish in Dumfries and Galloway, Scotland

Coordinates: 55.2942°N 3.4461°W

Kirkpatrick-Juxta is a parish in Dumfries and Galloway on the A701, between Biggar, Moffat and Lockerbie. The parish straddles the main road A74 (M). It is primarily a rural parish.

One source describes its name as meaning "the lands next to the church of St Patrick". Another source describes it as the church of St. Patrick named in the 15th century as closest to the See of Glasgow (the other churches were Kirkpatrick-Fleming, Kirkpatrick in Nithsdale, Kirkpatrick-Durham and Kirkpatrick-Irongray). Another source says the original name was Kilpatrick.

The 1791-1845 Statistical Accounts of Scotland described the size of the Parish as 21,000 acres (33 sq mi; 85 km^{2}) with Johnstone Parish to the South, Crawford and closeburn to the West and Wamphry and Moffat to the East and North. Previously the parish was part of the county of Dumfriesshire but became part of the Dumfries and Galloway Council Area following the Local Government (Scotland) Act 1974.

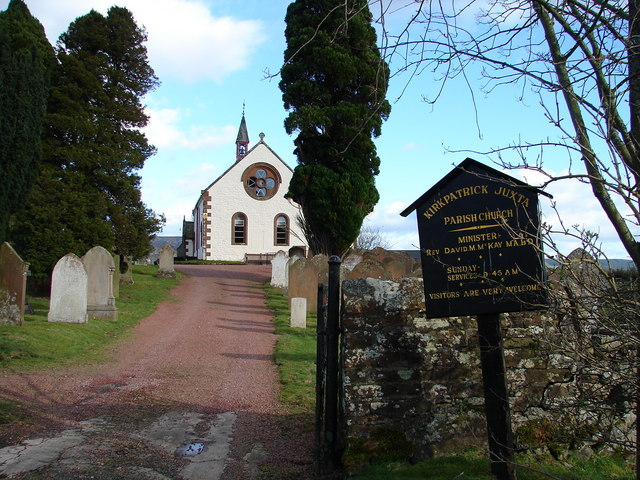
Kirkpatrick Juxta Church near Beattock

The parish church was built in 1798/1799 designed by John McCracken a mason from Dumfries. It was remodelled and given a new interior in 1875 by James Barbour. The previous church was built about 1676.

The parish includes Beattock railway station, sections of the River Annan and Queensberry Hill.

The ruins of Auchincass Castle also lie in the parish.

== Notable residents ==
- Very Rev William Singer, Moderator of the General Assembly of the Church of Scotland in 1830
- Jimmy Niven (1861-1933) footballer
