= Moffat Museum =

Museum in Scotland

- Established: 1984
- Location: Moffat, Scotland
- Coordinates: 55°19′55″N 3°26′38″W
- Type: Local

Moffat Museum is a community museum in Moffat, Scotland.

It was established in the Old Moffat Bakehouse in 1984. The museum expanded into a neighbouring building and reopened in 2013. It is arranged over two floors and has a courtyard at the back of the building. The museum focuses on local and family history and includes topics such as farming, local trades and crafts, sports, education and the Hydropathic Hotel and Spa. There is also a model railway and information on Moffat railway station.
