= Moffat Town Hall =

Municipal building in Moffat, Scotland

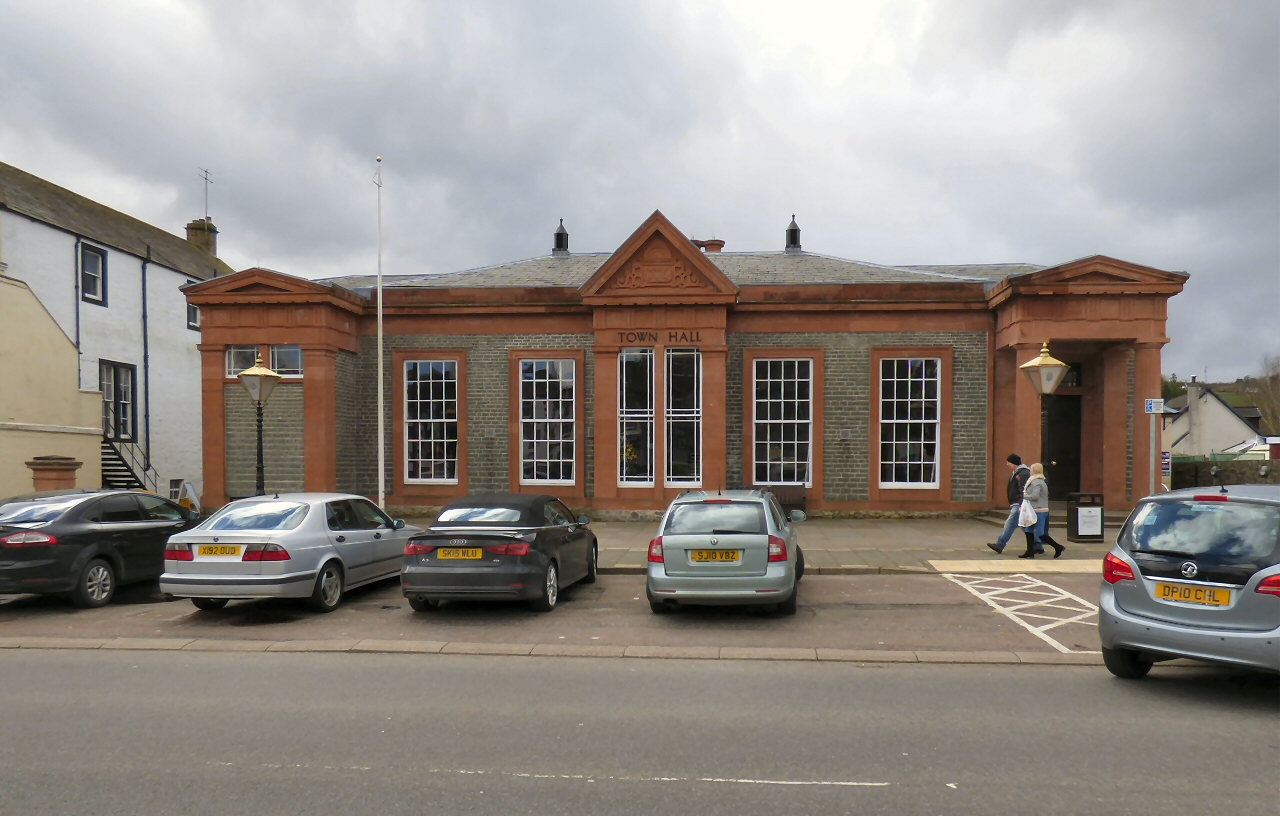
- Moffat Town Hall

- Shown in Dumfries and Galloway
- 55.3333°N 3.4452°W
- Location: High Street, Moffat

History
- Built: 1827

Site notes
- Architect: Walter Newall
- Architectural style: Neoclassical style

Listed Building – Category B
- Official name: Town Hall, High Street, Moffat
- Designated: 3 August 1971
- Reference no.: LB37927

Moffat Town Hall is a municipal building in the High Street in Moffat, Dumfries and Galloway, Scotland. The structure, which is used as community events venue, is a Category B listed building.

== History ==
In the early 1820s, a group of local businessmen decided to form a company known as the "Moffat Bath Company" to finance and commission a new bath house for users of the sulphurous spring in the town. Users of the spring had already included the poet, Robert Burns, and the biographer, James Boswell. The plan was to take advantage of increasing demand by piping the sulphurous water down from the spring to a tank, and then on to the new bath house in the centre of the town. The new building was designed by Walter Newall in the neoclassical style, built in coursed whinstone with ashlar dressings and was completed in 1827.

The design involved a broadly symmetrical single-storey main frontage with seven bays facing onto the High Street with the end bays projected forward as pavilions. The central bay, which was also projected forward, contained two tall casement windows flanked by Doric order pilasters supporting an entablature, a frieze with triglyphs, and a pediment with a panel inscribed with the word "Baths" in the tympanum. The connecting sections were fenestrated with sash windows with architraves. The left hand end bay was pilastered and infilled, while the right hand end bay took the form of a Doric order portico. Internally, the principal rooms were the baths themselves, which were at the back of the complex, and a large assembly room, which was at the front of the complex and was used by the burgh council as its meeting place from an early stage.

The building was acquired by the commissioners of burgh property in 1897 and then transferred to the burgh council itself for a nominal sum in 1966. It then continued to serve as the meeting place of the burgh council for much of the 20th century but ceased to be the local seat of government when the enlarged Annandale and Eskdale District Council was formed in 1975.

The Moffat Town Hall Redevelopment Trust, a charity which was formed in 2008, acquired a 21-year lease over the building from Dumfries and Galloway Council in November 2012. The trust went on to commission a programme of refurbishment works costing £600,000. The work, which was financed by Historic Scotland and Dumfries and Galloway Council, involved stripping away external paintwork, repairs to the masonry and repointing of the cement, and was completed in 2013.

A plaque to commemorate the life of Lieutenant Samuel Wallace of the Royal Field Artillery, who was awarded the Victoria Cross for his actions at Gonnelieu in France during the First World War, was dedicated at the town hall on 20 November 2017.

== See also ==
- List of listed buildings in Moffat, Dumfries and Galloway
