= Moffat RFC =

Scottish rugby union club, based in Moffat

(Scotland) Moffat RFC
- Full name: Moffat Rugby Football Club
- Union: Scottish Rugby Union
- Nickname: The Rams
- Founded: 1994
- Location: Moffat, Scotland
- Ground: Holm Park, Moffat
- President: (Scotland) David Little
- Coach: (Scotland) Cammy Little
- Captain: (Scotland) Ryan Herdsman
- League: West Division Three
- 2019–20: West Division Three, 5th in Conf 1
Team kit

Official website
- moffatramsrfc.org

Moffat Rugby Football Club (abbreviated as Moffat RFC) and known as The Rams are a rugby union side, currently playing in the West Division Three.

The team is based in Moffat in south-west Scotland, and they play at Holm Park.

== History ==
Founded in 1994, the club is named "The Rams" after the statue in the High Street which commemorates Moffat's connections with the wool trade. The ground is situated at The Holm, Selkirk Road and is wholly owned by the club.

1st XV senior training takes place on Tuesday and Thursdays at 7pm, at Holm Park.

Cammy Little of the Rams won the Glasgow Warriors Community Hero of the 2021–22 season.

== Honours ==
- Scottish Rugby Union West Division Four
  - Champions: 2014-15
- Glasgow Warriors Community Hero of the Year 2021-22
  - Cammy Little

== Notable former players ==
- Roy Laidlaw
- Alex Dunbar
