= William Singer (minister) =

Scottish minister

William Singer (c.1770–1840) was a Scottish minister who served as Moderator of the General Assembly of the Church of Scotland in 1830. He also was a historian, mapping the Roman roads of Dumfriesshire and also took a strong interest in agricultural improvements.

== Life ==
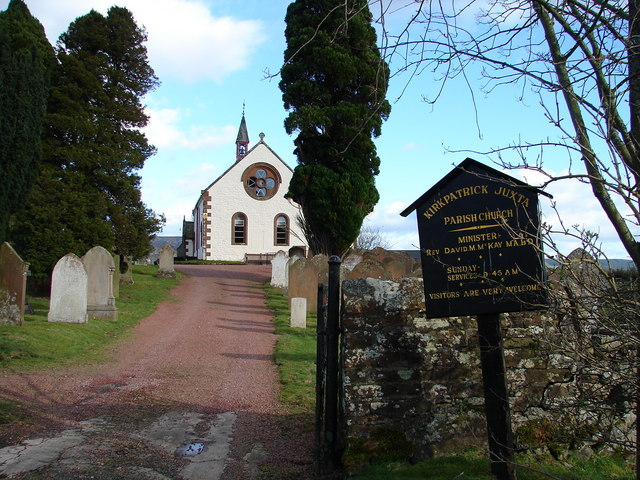
Kirkpatrick Juxta Church near Beattock

He is thought to be the eldest son of William Singer (d.1820) and was born in Dumfriesshire.

From around 1795 he was minister of the parish of Kirkpatrick-Juxta.

The parish church was built in 1798/1799 designed by John McCracken. It was remodelled and given a new interior in 1875 by James Barbour.

In 1830 he succeeded Very Rev Patrick Forbes as Moderator.

He was a member of the Royal Highland and Agricultural Society, writing frequently on irrigation issues.

He died on 27 October 1840.

== Publications ==
- General Observations on the Practice and Principles of Irrigation
- Report of Survey of Watered Meadows in Dumfriesshire (1806)
- A Statement of the Numbers the Duties the Families and the Livings of the Church of Scotland (1807)
- General View of the Agriculture, State of Property and Improvements in the County of Dumfries (1812)
