= Moffat toffee =

Confection made in Moffat, Scotland

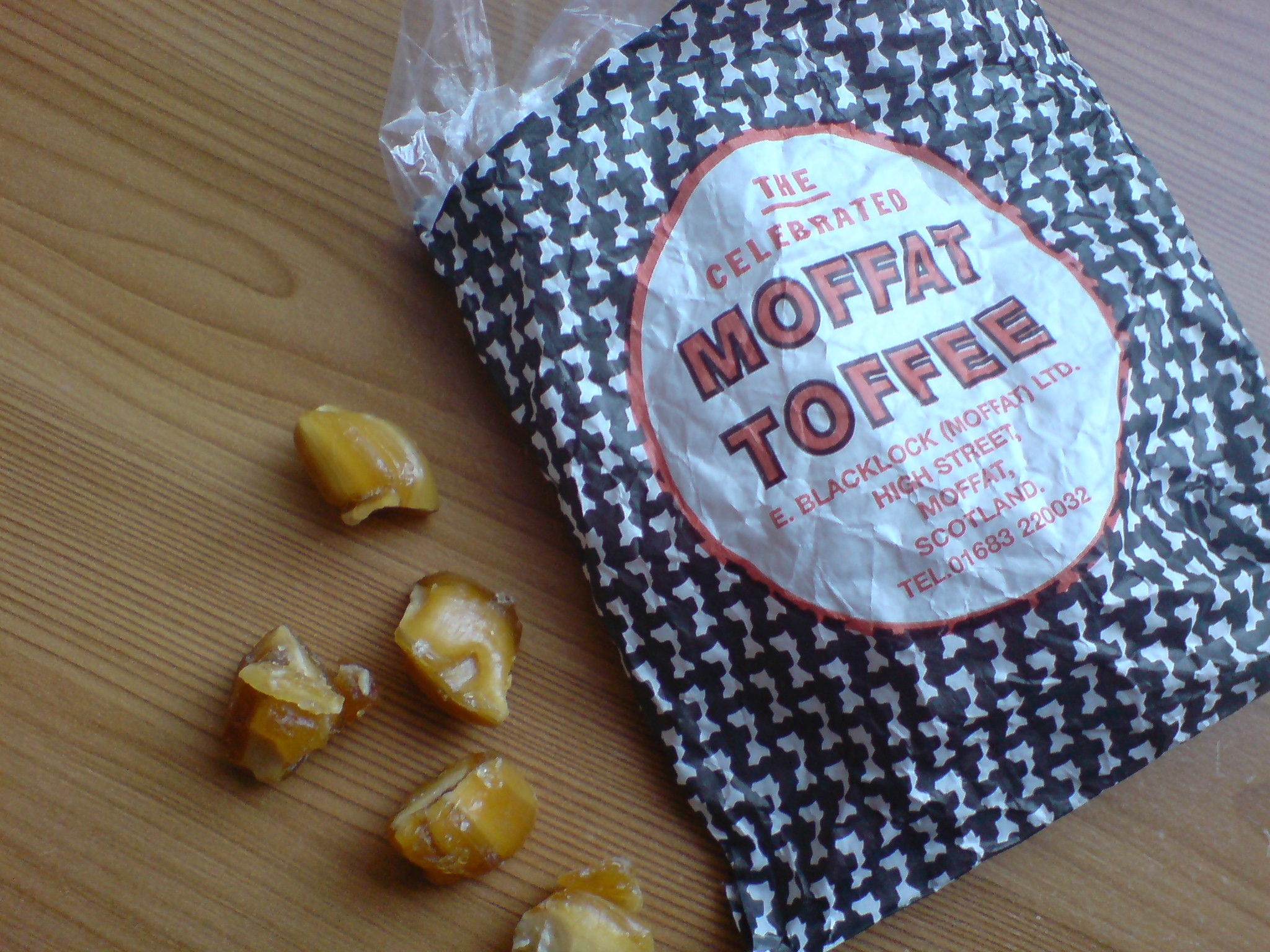
- Moffat toffee with accompanying paper bag
- Type: Confectionery
- Place of origin: Scotland
- Region or state: Dumfriesshire
- Created by: Janet Cook Johnstone

Moffat toffee is a boiled sweet originating from and made in the Scottish town of Moffat.

The confection has a tangy but sweet centre which gives the sweet its unusual flavour.

The Moffat Toffee old family recipe is thought to have been used for the first time commercially by present owner Blair Blacklock's great-grandmother, Janet Cook Johnstone, around the late 19th century. The toffee was made by hand in batches of about 7 lbs (3 kilos) at the time. It was sold mainly in uncut flat rounds of varying sizes. To this day it is still made in Moffat and over 300 kilos of the sweet are made every week.

The sweet can be found in many sweet shops, garden centres and other retail outlets in Scotland, including the Moffat Toffee Shop.
