= Jimmy Niven =

Scottish footballer

James Bryden Niven (10 February 1861 – 1933) was a Scottish international footballer.

Niven was born in the parish of Kirkpatrick-Juxta near Moffat, Dumfriesshire, the son of James Bryden Niven, Sr. and Elizabeth Saunders.

Niven was one of two Scottish internationalists from Moffat. The other was James Fraser. While playing for Moffat F.C., Niven was an awarded a full Scotland international cap, for having played in the 8–2 defeat of Ireland on 14 March 1885. The game was played at the second Hampden Park, later known as Cathkin Park, and Alex Higgins of Kilmarnock scored a hat-trick. This was the only full international cap that both players received.

Niven died in West Derby, Lancashire, in 1933.
