= Stranraer Academy =

Secondary school in Stranraer, Scotland

Location
- McMaster's Road; Stranraer, Dumfries and Galloway, DG9 8BY; Scotland

Information
- Type: Secondary school
- Motto: Aim high, work hard, be kind, no excuses
- Religious affiliation: Secular
- Established: 1845; 181 years ago
- Headteacher: Jamie Farquhar
- Gender: Co-educational
- Age: 11 to 18
- Enrolment: 992 at Sept 2023
- Houses: Inch, Logan, Dunskey, Glenapp
- Colours: Blue, white, black (Senior School)
- School years: S1 - S6
- Feeder schools: Belmont, Castle Kennedy, Drochduil, Drummore, Glenluce, Kirkcolm, Leswalt, Park, Portpatrick, Rephad, St. Joseph’s, Sandhead, Sheuchan
- Website: http://www.stranraeracademy.org

Stranraer Academy is a secondary school in Stranraer in south west Scotland. It serves the area of Stranraer, the Rhins, and parts of the Machars.

The original Stranraer Academy was opened in 1845 at a cost of £2000 (equivalent to £160,000 in 2024). It was built on the site of the present Stranraer Campus of Dumfries & Galloway College. In 1965 a new Academy (B Block) was built alongside a new High School (A Block), and in 1970 the schools joined together.

== Recent history ==
The Academy is a six-year comprehensive school, with a school roll above 1000, and is the second-most attended secondary school in Dumfries and Galloway. Nearly 100 full- and part-time teachers work at the academy, and are aided by a team of support staff.

In May 2006, the school's rector, Jimmy Higgins, announced his retirement following an unfavorable HMIe report in January 2006 and left the following August. After his retirement, Joanna Pallet became Acting Head Teacher until a replacement (Norman Dawson) could be found.

The school received a follow-up report from HMIe January 2008. The inspectorate stated that there have been "significant improvements", particularly in terms of the overall quality of learning and teaching and that there had also been some improvements in pupils' attainment, relative to schools with similar characteristics. They also stated that more now remained to be done to rebuild the school's reputation in the community, improve attainment levels, address staffing difficulties and deal with outstanding health and safety issues.

== Buildings ==
Part of the Academy's Phase 1 Project.

Up to the mid-1990s the school consisted of three buildings built in the 1960s and 70s. At this time Dumfries & Galloway Council drew up plans to rebuild the entire school by 2000. Phase 1 was opened in 1997. In February 2000 A Block was vacated and classes moved into newly refurbished areas in B and C Block, creating a more compact campus. Due to funding problems (particular with [PPP] projects) Phase 2 was continually delayed by the council, along with the demolition of 'A' Block, which lay empty and derelict for five years. After campaigning by the local newspaper, school, school board, and student council, demolition work on 'A' Block finally begun in 2005, being completed in January 2006.

The academy was part of Dumfries and Galloway's £100 million public private partnership (PPP) project to build nine new schools within Dumfries and Galloway (e4d&g). The new school was completed in early 2010.

Delays in completion of Phase 2 of the Academy has led to a deterioration in the building quality of the 1997 New Building, and thus as part of the e4d&g project this building is to be fully refurbished.

== Notable former pupils ==
- Jamie Adams, Footballer - St. Johnstone FC
- Richard Arkless, SNP Former Member of Parliament for Dumfries and Galloway
- Colin Calderwood, Scotland Football International
- Craig Hamilton, Scotland Rugby International - Edinburgh Rugby
- Emma Harper, SNP Member of the Scottish Parliament for South of Scotland
- Allan Jenkins, Footballer - Greenock Morton
- Kevin Kyle, Scottish Football International - Professional Footballer
- Bobby Lammie, Olympic curler
- Euan Kyle, curler
- Allan Little, BBC Foreign Correspondent
- Rory Loy, Footballer
- David Speirs MP, Australian Politician
- Dame Leslie Strathie, Former Chief Executive of HM Revenue and Customs
- Fred Urquhart (writer)

== Gallery ==

Stranraer Academy's B Block, pictured in 2004 before a refurbishment.

In 2005 the school's old 'A' Block was demolished after five years sitting empty

View of the 'New Building' pictured in 2000. The building was completed in 1997/8.
