= Tom Parrinello =

English footballer (born 1989)

Personal information
- Full name: Tommaso Salvatore Parrinello
- Date of birth: 11 November 1989 (age 36)
- Place of birth: Stoke Gifford, England
- Height: 5 ft 4 in (1.63 m)
- Position: Defender

Team information
- Current team: Hambrook AFC
- Number: 6

Senior career*
Years	Team	Apps	(Gls)
2006–2009	Bristol Rovers	77	(1)
2008–2009	→ Weston-super-Mare (loan)	6	(0)
2009–2010	Weston-super-Mare	2	(0)
2010–2011	Gloucester City	35	(0)
- Mangotsfield Utd
	Hambrook Afc	34	(1)
- * Club domestic league appearances and goals as of 23 March 2011

Tommaso Salvatore "Tom" Parrinello (born 11 November 1989) is an English former football defender of Italian descent who is currently a full time plasterer for RR Coke plastering services.

== Career ==
Parrinello made his debut for the Bristol Rovers first team on 1 December 2007, when he appeared in an FA Cup second round match against Rushden & Diamonds, coming on as a substitute for Craig Disley.

He was the youngest of the five scholars to be offered a professional contract in the summer of 2006. As a sixteen-year-old, he made a number of reserve team appearances in 2005/06 and was a regular in the reserve side in 2006/07 and 2007/08.

Parrinello joined Weston-super-Mare on loan in December 2008 in order to gain some first team experience, but the move became permanent two months later.

He joined Gloucester City in the summer of 2010 and was as an almost ever-present for the 2010/11 season.

In 2011/12 season he joined Mangotsfield Utd.

He is currently the Lead Professional Development Phase Coach at Bristol Rovers having previously held other coaching roles within the academy.
