= Matt Groves =

English footballer (born 1988)

Personal information
- Full name: Matthew Groves
- Date of birth: 11 December 1988 (age 37)
- Place of birth: Bristol, England
- Position: Striker

Team information
- Current team: Bristol Manor Farm

Youth career
- 2007: Bristol Rovers

Senior career*
Years	Team	Apps	(Gls)
2007–2009	Bristol Rovers	1	(0)
2008	→ Chippenham Town (loan)	3	(0)
2008	→ Tiverton Town (loan)	7	(1)
2009	→ Mangotsfield United (loan)	15	(2)
2009	Weston-super-Mare	3	(0)
2009–2010	Weymouth	24	(2)
2010	Yate Town	8	(2)
2010	Mangotsfield United	39	(11)
2013–2015	Gloucester City	55	(6)
2015–2017	Mangotsfield United	75	(11)
2017	Larkhall Athletic	?	(?)
2017–	Bristol Manor Farm	?	(?)
- * Club domestic league appearances and goals as of 7 June 2017 (UTC)

Matthew Groves (born 11 December 1988) is an English professional footballer who plays for Bristol Manor Farm. He plays as a striker.Recently joined step 5 club Bitton AFC under manager Dan Langdon.

== Career ==
Born in Bristol, Groves graduated through the Bristol Rovers centre of excellence, based at the Bristol Academy of Sport, and was awarded his first professional contract by Rovers in May 2007. His debut for the first team came on 1 December 2007, in a second-round FA Cup match against Rushden & Diamonds when he came on as a substitute for Andy Williams.

In March 2008 Groves joined Chippenham Town on loan until the end of the 2007–08 season. At the start of the following season he moved to Tiverton Town on loan.

He made a third loan move in December 2008, this time to Mangotsfield United where he remained for three months, but after returning to his parent club he was released from his contract. After his release he was signed by Weston-super-Mare to play for them in the Conference South, where he made one start and two substitute appearances.

After a trial at another Conference South club, Weymouth, Groves signed a one-year deal in July 2009. He left the financially troubled club in March 2010 when faced with the alternative of a 50% pay cut. He had scored twice from 24 league games. He ended the 2010–11 season with a brief stint at Yate Town, before re-joining their local rivals Mangotsfield United that summer.
