= Millburn Academy =

- Acadamaidh Allt a' Mhuilinn

Location
- Diriebught Road; Inverness, IV2 3QR; Scotland; 57.4792°N 4.2087°W

Information
- Type: Secondary school, state funded
- Motto: Strive to Achieve
- Established: 1961; 65 years ago
- Local authority: Highland
- Acting Rector: Johnny Croall
- Staff: approx. 135 (70 teaching)
- Enrolment: approx. 1130
- Website: www.millburnacademy.co.uk

Millburn Academy (Gaelic: Acadamaidh Allt a' Mhuilinn) is a six-year secondary school in Inverness, Scotland. It serves the portion of Inverness east of the River Ness along with rural areas to the south of the city's reach, with a catchment area that includes the primary schools of Crown, Daviot, Drakies, Inshes, Raigmore and Strathdearn. The school runs parallel to the 'Mill Burn' which was originally used for a Whisky distillery. The distillery is now gone and has been replaced by a chain hotel.

== School badge ==
The school badge was designed by the former head of Art and Design at the school, the late James Cameron. It consists of:

- A torch: the symbol of learning;
- A mill wheel and water which operated on the Mill Burn;
- An eagle, the symbol of St John and the school motto, "Strive to Achieve".

== School building ==
The original school building and school huts were replaced by the new school building in 2007. The new school was built through the Public Private Partnership Agreement for £26,000,000. The building consists of 3 floors. The ground floor is made up of the support for learning, guidance, physical education and technical departments as well as a large social area. There is also a canteen on the ground floor which serves hot and cold meals daily. A notable feature is the huge sports hall which is situated in the centre of the building. The first floor is made up of the business, history, geography, modern studies, religious education, mathematics, music and science departments. The spiral staircase in the main foyer leads up to another social area. The second and top floor is made up of the English, modern languages and art departments.

The school also has a large grass playing field and a fourth generation astroturf multi-purpose pitch. The car parking facilities are available both adjacent to Diriebught Road and Victoria drive.

== Rectors ==
- John Mathieson MA FRSGS 1961 - 1972
- William T Weatherspoon BSc Dip Ed 1972 - 1989
- GC Spence MA 1990 - 2007
- Delia Thornton MA 2007- 2011
- Gavin MacLean 2011–2018
- Johnny Croall 2018–2023
- Kerry Sinclair 2023–Present
