= James Fraser (footballer) =

Scottish footballer

James Fraser was a Scottish international footballer.

James Fraser was one of two internationalists from Moffat in Dumfries and Galloway, the other being James B Niven. Fraser was a prominent forward in south of Scotland football but little is known about his life or playing career.

He gained his one Scottish international cap while playing for Moffat F.C. The game was on 28 March 1891 at Celtic Park, with a 2–1 victory for Scotland against Ireland.
