= Stewarton Academy =

Secondary school in Stewarton, East Ayrshire, Scotland

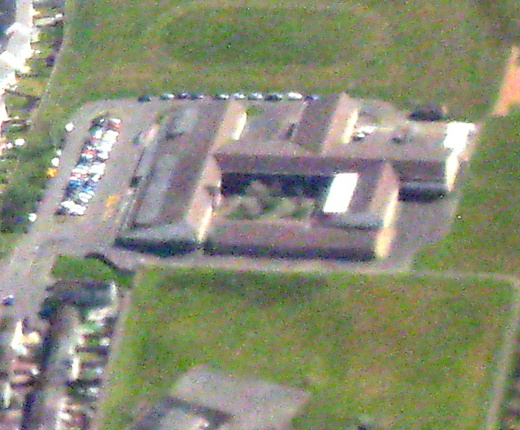
- School badge Aerial view of Stewarton Academy

Location
- Cairnduff Place, Stewarton, East Ayrshire, Scotland, KA3 5QF; 55.68252°N 4.50118°W

Information
- Type: 11–18 non demonational secondary school
- Motto: Be Courteous
- Authority: East Ayrshire Council
- Head teacher: John Stuart
- Grades: S1–S6
- Gender: Boys and girls
- Age range: 11–18
- Enrollment: 914 (2026)
- Color
- Website: Stewarton Academy

Stewarton Academy is a 11–18 co-educational, non-denominational secondary school in the town of Stewarton, East Ayrshire, Scotland. The current Head Teacher of Stewarton Academy is Mr John Stuart. As of November 2026, Stewarton Academy had a total of 914 pupils attending the school.

== Overview ==
=== History ===
In November 2020, the school was affected by an outbreak of COVID-19. As a result, the school was deep cleaned prior to pupils and staff returning.

Pupils at Stewarton Academy won the Readers Cup Challenge in 2016 against other local schools.

=== Catchment ===
Stewarton Academy serves a rural part of East Ayrshire including Stewarton, Dunlop and Kilmaurs. Currently, Stewarton Academy has four associated primary schools; Dunlop Primary School, Kilmaurs Primary School, Nether Robertland Primary School and Lainshaw Primary School. Pupils attending Stewarton Academy from the areas of Lugton, Burnhouse and Dunlop, Cunninghamhead and Kilmaurs are entitled to subsidised school transportation as a result of the rural nature of the schools catchment area.

Stewarton Academy provides a training programme to pupils interested in a career within the construction industry. This initiative has been funded and supported by local construction firm GRAHAM.

=== Upgrade investments ===
In 2017, East Ayrshire Council pledged £13.2 million in investment towards Stewarton Academy in order to provide vital upgrades and repairs to the current school estate.

Over the next six years, Stewarton Academy will see full refurbishment of the existing building, improved sports facilities and the construction of a new extension. Funding has been allocated by East Ayrshire Council for:

- £7 million for the extension
- £2 million to upgrade the sports facilities
- £4 million to improve heating, electrical systems, ventilation systems, roofing, accessibility adaptations and hospitality and catering facilities
- £2.5 million for additional support needs provision

== Attainment and achievement ==
=== Academic performance ===
The school's academic performance in terms of examination results is above the national average in Scotland. In 2022, it ranked as the 190th best performing state school in Scotland, an increase from its position in 2021 where it was ranked as the 200th best performing Scottish secondary school. As a result, Stewart Academy is regarded as the best performing secondary school in East Ayrshire.

In 2019, the percentage of fourth year (S4) pupils at Stewarton Academy who attained 5 or more A–C pass grades at SCQF Level 3 or higher stood at 59.8%, increasing to 78.6% in 2020 with a slight decrease to 76.2% in 2021. Different measures were used to obtain data for pass results during the COVID-19 pandemic in Scotland (2020–2021). In 2022, the number of pupils obtaining five of more passes at Level 3 decreased to 70%. The number of pupils who obtained five or more SCQF passes at Level 4 in 2019 was 59.1%, 75.6% in 2020, 76.2% in 2021 and 60% in 2022. Five or more SCQF passes at Level 5 stood at 37.3% in 2019, 49.1% in 2020, 47.7 in 2021 and increased to 53% in 2022.

Pupils in sixth year (S6) attaining at least one qualification at SCQF Level 6 (Higher) stood at 48% in 2018 before decreasing to 45% in 2019. In 2020, the percentage dropped further to 39.7% before an increase to 44% the following year. By 2022, the percentage of pupils attaining at least one higher qualification increased again to 49%. By contrast, the number of pupils attaining three or more higher qualifications at SCQF Level 6 in 2018 stood at 24%, dropping to 17% in 2019 before increasing to 27% the following year. In both 2021 and 2022, the percentage remained unchanged at 24% attaining three or more higher qualifications.

The Advanced Higher performance of pupils in S6 at Stewarton Academy is consistently strong, with 31% of pupils in S6 attaining at least one Advanced Higher qualification in 2022. In 2018, this stood at 28.8% before decreasing for the next two years, falling to 26.9% in 2019 and 20.6% in 2020. It increased slightly to 21.8% in 2021.

=== Extra–curricular ===
Wider achievement at Stewarton Academy is provided via the means of clubs that pupils may partake in, including theatre trips, debating, young enterprise activities, wind bands choirs, the Stewarton Academy Jazz Band, music club, the Stewarton Academy String Group, football, netball, gymnastics, table tennis, dodgeball, athletics/cross country and dance clubs.

Each year group at Stewarton Academy are represented by Pupil Councillors who represent their respective year group within the School Senate. It is the responsibility of the Pupil Councillors to collate pupil responses for inclusion in national surveys and discussions. Meetings of the School Senate are held at least twice yearly where all Pupil Councillors and the Senior Senators meet as the School Senate, with Pupil Councillor required to feedback to their peers on the discussions and outcomes of each meeting of the senate.

== See also ==
- List of schools in Scotland
