= Lockerbie Academy =

Coordinates: 55.1289°N 3.3589°W

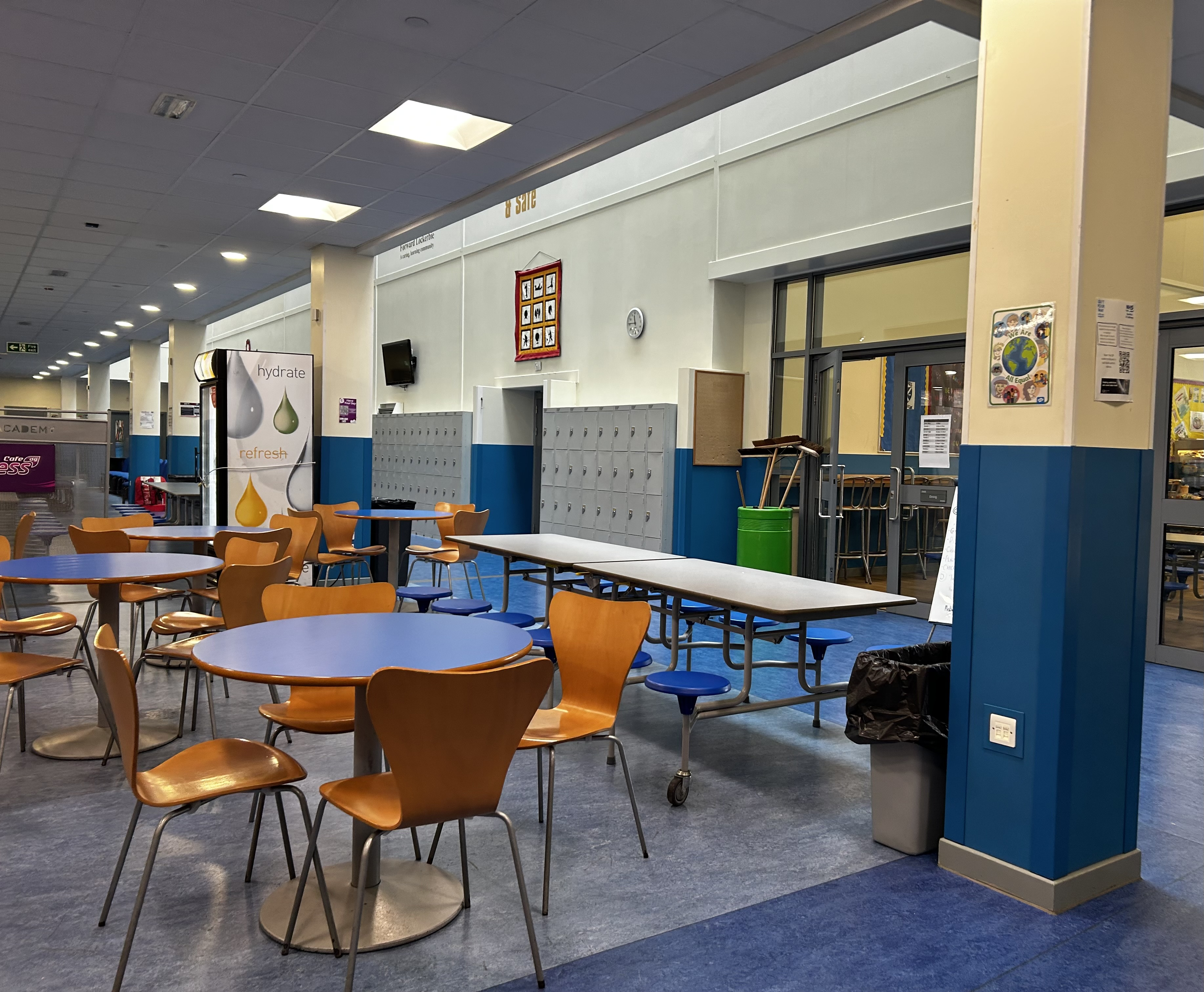
- Lockerbie Academy's Lunch Hall

Location
- Lockerbie Academy, Glasgow Road, Lockerbie; Lockerbie, Scotland; South-West of Scotland; Dumfries and Galloway, DG11 2AT; Scotland; 55°07'43.8"N 3°21'31.7"W

Information
- Former name: Dryfesdale Public Old School
- Type: Non-Denominational Secondary School
- Motto: Nunquam Non Paratus (Never Unprepared)
- Established: 1845; 181 Years Ago
- Local authority: Dumfries and Galloway Council
- School number: SEED: 5948630
- Head teacher: Nav Munogee
- Acting headteacher: Kerry Curry
- Gender: Mixed
- Age range: 11-18
- Education system: The Scottish Curriculum for Excellence
- Language: English
- Hours in school day: 6
- Houses: Milk Kirtle Annan Dryfe
- Slogan: Forward Lockerbie
- Feeder schools: Applegarth Primary School Eaglesfield Primary School Hightae Primary School Hoddom Primary School Hottsbridge Primary School Johnstonebridge Primary School Lockerbie Primary School Lochmaben Primary School Nethermill Primary School St Mungo Primary School Tundergarth Primary School
- Affiliation: Syracuse University
- Information: 4th Scottish Secondary School to win the National Nurturing Schools Award from NurtureUK
- Website: lockerbieacademy.dumgal.sch.uk

Lockerbie Academy is a mainstream Non-denominational secondary school in Lockerbie, Scotland. It is combined with Lockerbie Primary. The school roll is around 700 students as of March 2026.

== History ==
=== Dryfesdale Public Old School ===
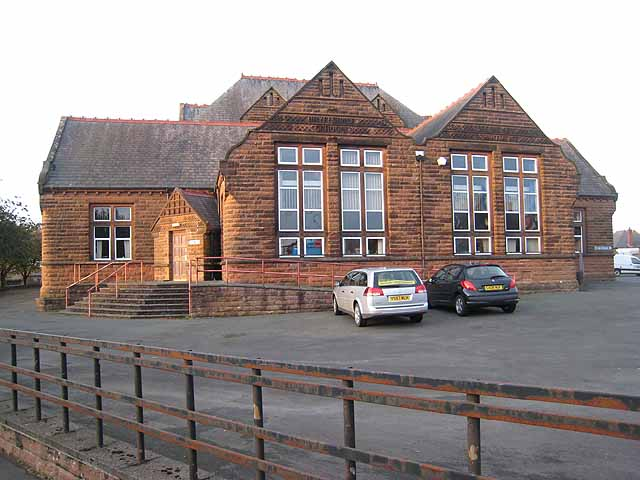
Lockerbie Old School in 2008

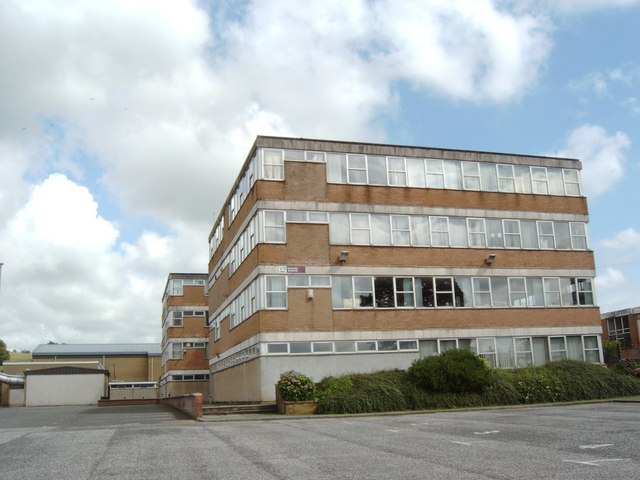
Lockerbie Academy in 2007 just a few years before it was demolished

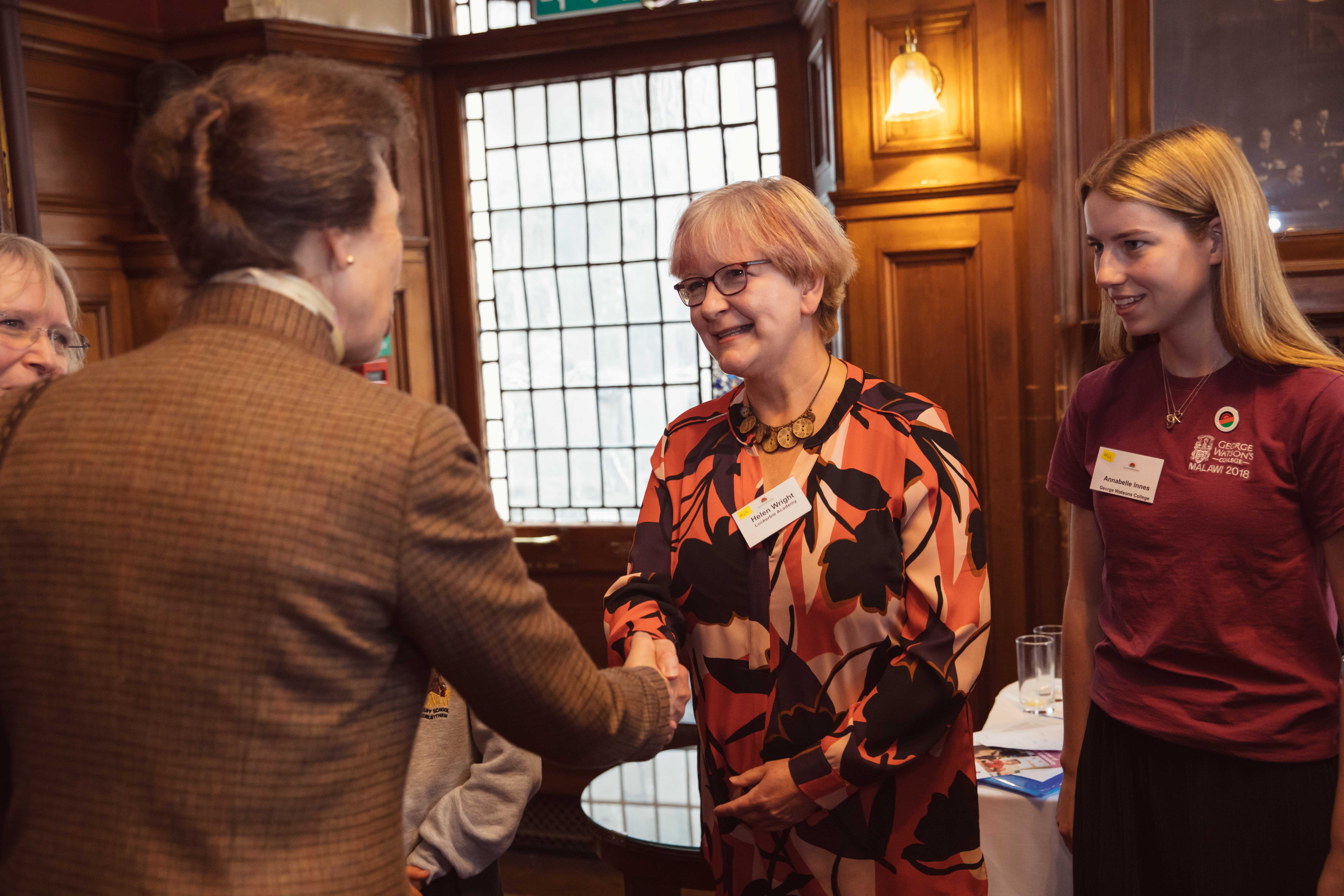
Helen Wright of Lockerbie Academy recognised by Princess Anne in 2019

The building housing the original Lockerbie Academy was built in 1875, as the Dryfesdale Public Old School – this building is known as the Lockerbie Old School. After the 1988 Lockerbie bombing, the Old School was used as a headquarters for the investigation.

=== Lockerbie Academy ===
Lockerbie Academy Opened in 1961 after Dryfesdale Public Old School served the town for nearly a century. After the opening of Lockerbie Academy, Dryfesdale Public Old School was then used as Lockerbie Primary School.

=== Thawale School Link ===
In Early 2009, Lockerbie Academy partnered with Thawale Primary School in the Mulanji District of Malawi. The link showed pupils from Lockerbie Academy visiting the primary school in Malawi, their last visit was in 2018. The partnership then ended in Early 2022.

=== Demolition of Lockerbie Academy ===
Lockerbie Academy was demolished in 2010 as a new Lockerbie Academy replaced it, it was also known to be structurally outdated. After Lockerbie Academy was demolished, the site was bought by Cunninghame Housing Association, who turned the site into a residential area, they named the residential street Academy Place due to the previous site being the location of Lockerbie Academy.

=== Opening of Present Lockerbie Academy ===
The present Lockerbie Academy building officially opened on the 21st of June 2010 with the opening performed by council leader Ivor Hyslop, David Mundell, Harley Copland, and Sadie Patterson. A Time Capsule was placed on the school ground which is to be opened on May 28th 2040.

=== Scholarship ===
The school created a scholarship programme with Syracuse University in New York, US; 35 students from Syracuse University were killed in the bombing over Lockerbie. For the 2025-2026 school year, the scholarship was replaced with a one-week immersion trip where pupils took part in remembrance ceremonies for the bombing, including a rose-laying ceremony and a service at Hendricks Chapel. The scholarship programme is to be resumed in autumn 2026.

== Memorial ==
Outside of Lockerbie Academy there is a Memorial Cairn meant for the victims of the Lockerbie Bombing. The Memorial was built before the opening of Lockerbie Academy.

Lockerbie Academy pupils visit the Hendricks Chapel every year for a Rose laying ceremony on a memorial for the victims.

== Sports ==
Lockerbie Academy has a Leisure and Sports Facility which includes; a 4-court sports hall, a 14-station gym and fitness suite, a dance studio, and a Multi-Use Games Area.

Soccer Stars Academy is a football class that takes place in Lockerbie Academy for 18 Months Old to 9 Year Olds.

== Literature ==
Lockerbie Academy has a book that was published in 2007 called ‘Gaun up Tae the Big Schule’ detailing the history of Lockerbie Academy.

== Eco Schools ==
Lockerbie Academy has been involved with Eco-Schools and was the first school in the Dumfries and Galloway area to be awarded the Green Flag in 2014. They are on their way to their third flag.

== Relationship with Syracuse ==
In 2019, Syracuse University students visited Lockerbie while on a London trip for the 2019 Lockerbie ambassadorial delegation. They visited Lockerbie Academy and different Memorials around Lockerbie.

=== Cycle to Syracuse ===
Cycle to Syracuse was a special event where firemen and police officers who responded to the Lockerbie Bombing cycled to Syracuse University for the 30th Anniversary of the Terrorist Attack. Alongside first responders were (now former) Lockerbie Academy Head Teacher Brian Asher.

== Neolithic Hall ==
In 2006, during the excavation for the upcoming Lockerbie Academy, Archaeologists had found the remains of a large Neolithic Timber Hall dating back to 3950-3700 BC.

=== Inside the Hall ===
Inside of the timber hall, experts had found rare Flax Seeds, showing early farming and plant processing.

=== Other periods ===
The timber hall had a Bronze Age cremation and inhumation cremation and a post-medieval corn-drying kiln.

== Awards ==
The School won 2 Green Flags from Eco-Schools making it the first in the Dumfries and Galloway region to get the award

The school won The National Nurturing Schools Award in 2026 from Nurture UK. Making it the 4th Scottish Secondary School to win the Award.

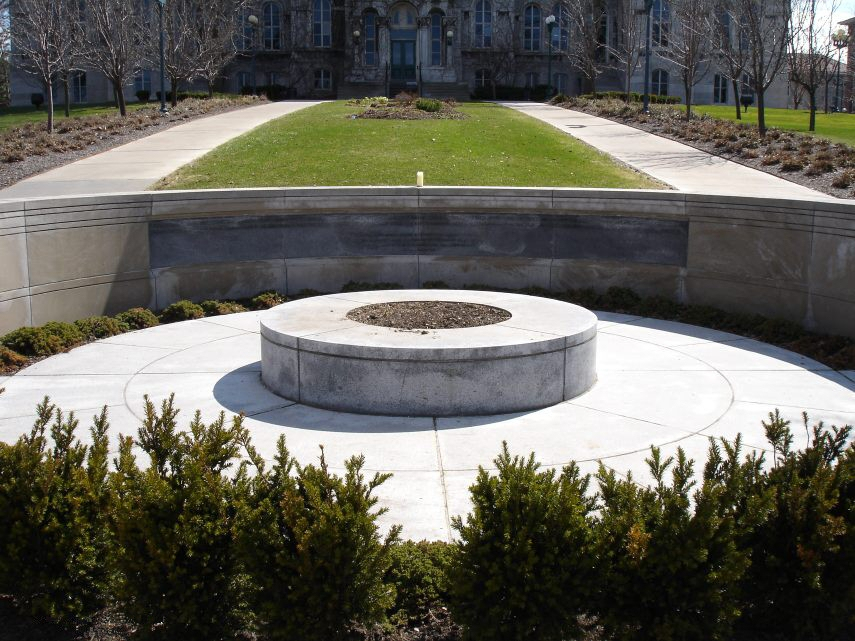
The Syracuse University Memorial for the 270 lives lost on Pan Am 103

== Notable alumni ==
- Nick De Luca, rugby union player.
- David Mundell: Scottish Conservatives politician and solicitor who has served as Member of Parliament for Dumfriesshire, Clydesdale and Tweeddale since 2005.
- David Murdoch, curler.

== In popular culture ==
Lockerbie Academy was used in the zombie movie called Outpost: Black Sun and was used as a fictional part of eastern Europe before it was demolished.

Lockerbie Academy is recreated and shown in the recently released Netflix limited series The Bombing Of Pan Am 103 where they used it as a Headquarters for the Investigation of the bombing.
