= Moffat Academy =

Location
- Moffat, DG10 9QL; Scotland
- Coordinates: 55.3292°N 3.4371°W

Information
- Motto: Ready Aye Ready
- Established: 1639
- Local authority: Dumfries and Galloway
- Head teacher: Tara Woods
- Gender: Co-educational
- Age: 2 to 18
- Enrolment: 577
- Houses: Hartfell, Queensberry (Secondary); Dowding, Macadam (Primary)
- Website: https://www.dumgal.gov.uk/article/15550/Moffat-Academy

Moffat Academy is a school in Moffat, Dumfries and Galloway, Scotland. It educates children from nursery to Secondary 6.

== History ==
Moffat Academy traces its history to the local grammar school founded in 1639 by Dr Johnstone. During the 1810s, the school entered a low period as there were suspicions that the funds endowed by Johnstone's estate were misused. It then merged with a local parish school in 1834 and named "Moffat Academy". Until the construction of new premises beginning in 2007, the school was housed on the same site for over 150 years. In 1988, fifth and sixth year classes were added, meaning pupils could now attend the school all the way to age 18. Prior to this students staying on after fourth year had to travel south to Lockerbie Academy to complete fifth and sixth years. The academy moved to its new premises in 2010.

On the 4th of March, 2024, First Minister Humza Yousaf and the Cabinet Secretary for Education and Skills Jenny Gilruth visited the academy to launch a new framework to combat gender-based violence in Scottish schools. While there, Yousaf spoke to pupils on topics ranging from gender-based violence to misogyny, and was given a tour of the school by head teacher Tara Woods. After the visit, Yousaf noted "I had heard a lot about the ethos and culture that’s being promoted within the school but I wanted to see it first hand and I’ve been blown away. It exceeded my expectations genuinely, just how incredibly inclusive an environment they have here at Moffat Academy."
