= Moffat, Dumfries and Galloway =

Coordinates: 55.332°N 3.442°W

Moffat: Scottish Gaelic: Am Magh Fada
- Town
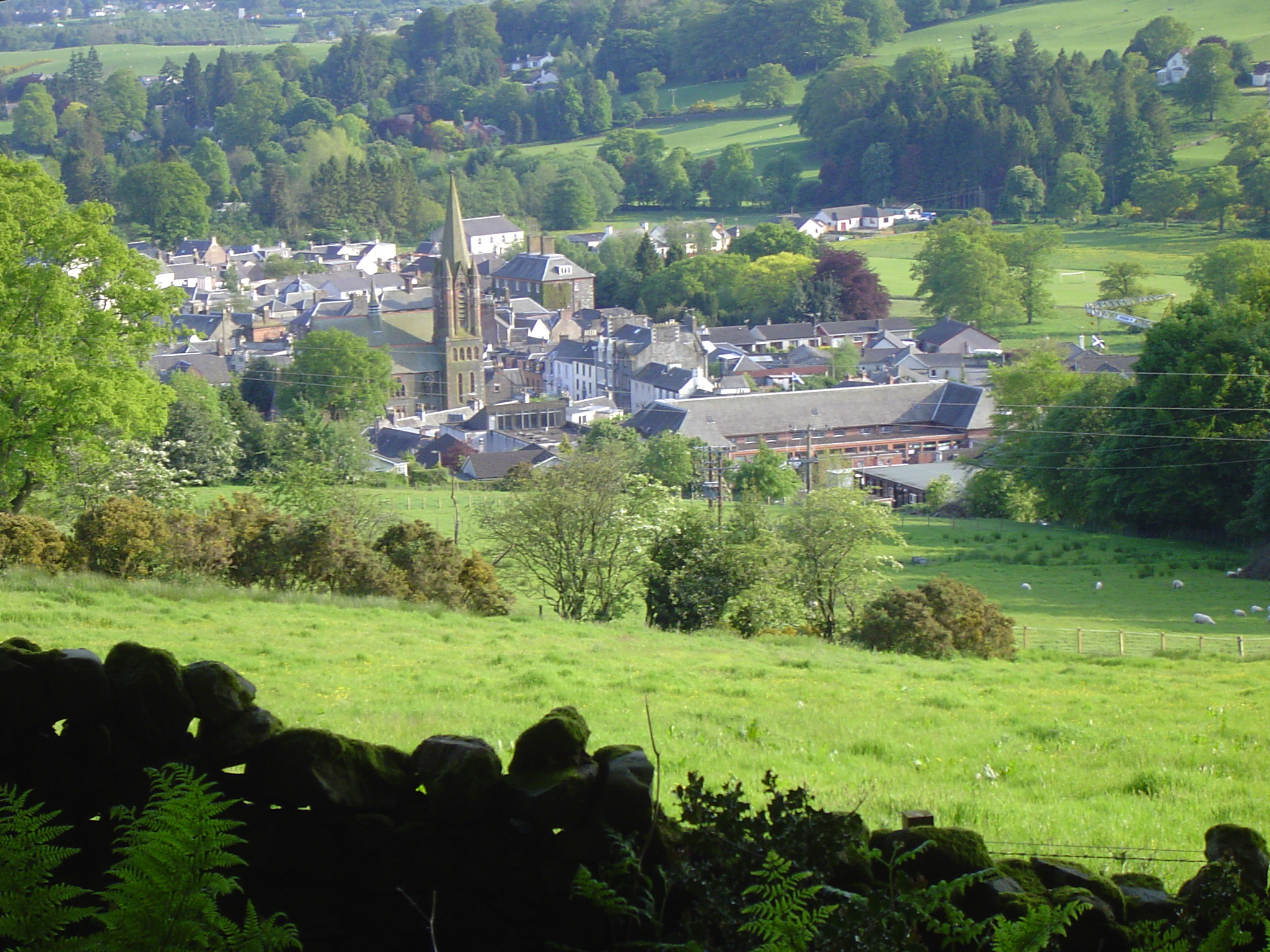
- Moffat from the surrounding hills

- Location within Dumfries and Galloway
- Population: 2,497 (2022)
- OS grid reference: NT085052
- Council area: Dumfries and Galloway
- Lieutenancy area: Dumfries
- Country: Scotland
- Sovereign state: United Kingdom
- Post town: MOFFAT
- Postcode district: DG10
- Dialling code: 01683
- Police: Scotland
- Fire: Scottish
- Ambulance: Scottish
- UK Parliament: Dumfriesshire, Clydesdale and Tweeddale
- Scottish Parliament: Dumfriesshire

Moffat is a historic market town, burgh and parish in Dumfries and Galloway, Scotland. Historically part of Dumfriesshire, it lies on the River Annan, and was a centre of the wool trade and a spa town. It had a population of 2,497 in 2022.

Moffat is around 59 miles (95 kilometres) to the southeast of Glasgow, 51 miles (82 kilometres) southwest of Edinburgh, 21 miles (34 kilometres) northeast of Dumfries and 44 miles (71 kilometres) northwest of Carlisle.

The Moffat House Hotel, located at the northern end of the High Street, was designed by John Adam. The nearby Star Hotel, a mere 20 ft (6 m) wide, was listed in the Guinness Book of Records as the narrowest hotel in the world. Moffat won the Britain in Bloom contest in 1996.

The town is held to be the ancestral seat of Clan Moffat. The Devil's Beef Tub, near Moffat was used by the members of Clan Moffat and later the members of Clan Johnstone to hoard cattle stolen in predatory raids. Moffat is home to Moffat toffee.

== History ==
=== Early tourism as a spa town ===
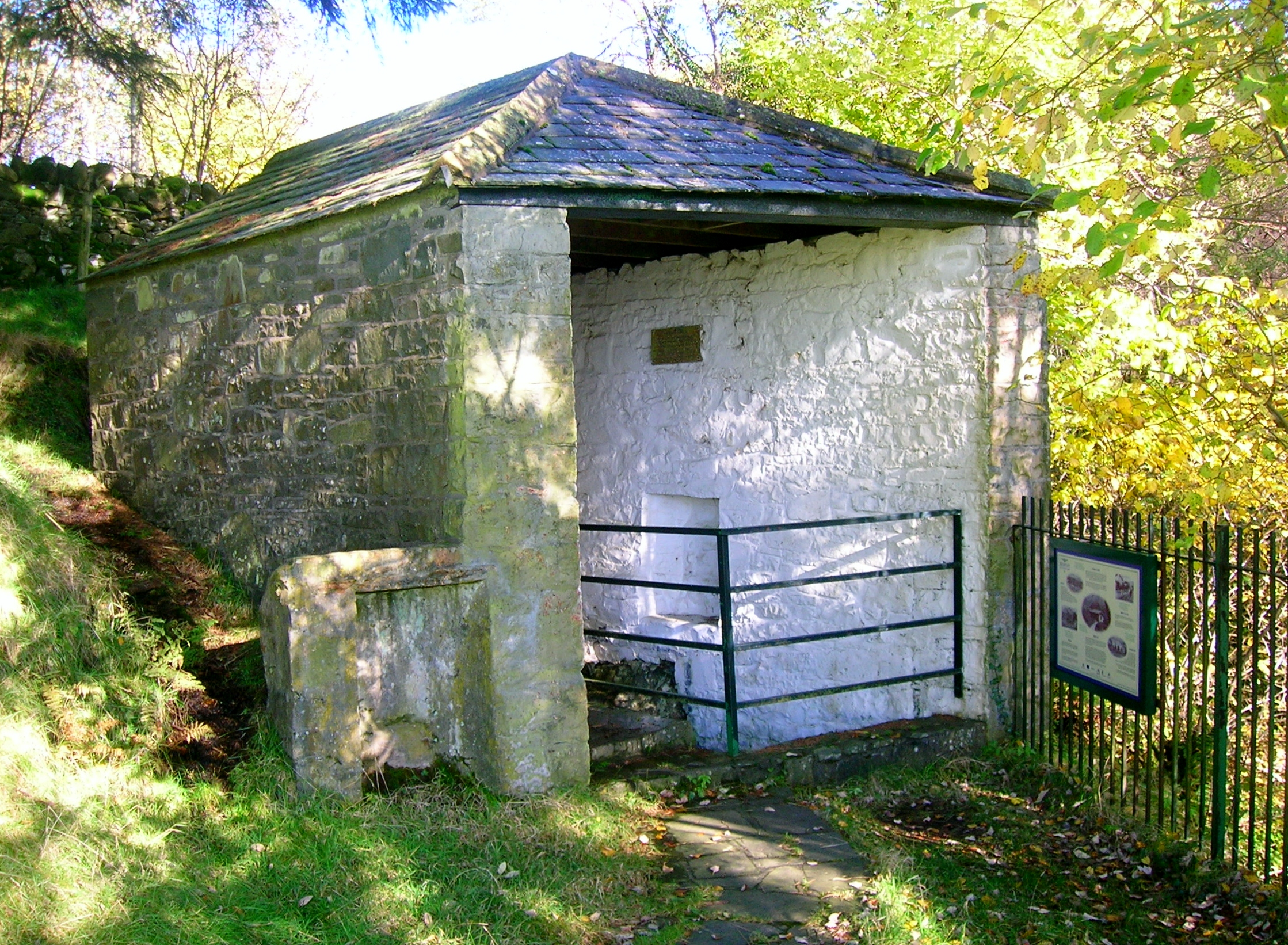
The old sulphurous well building

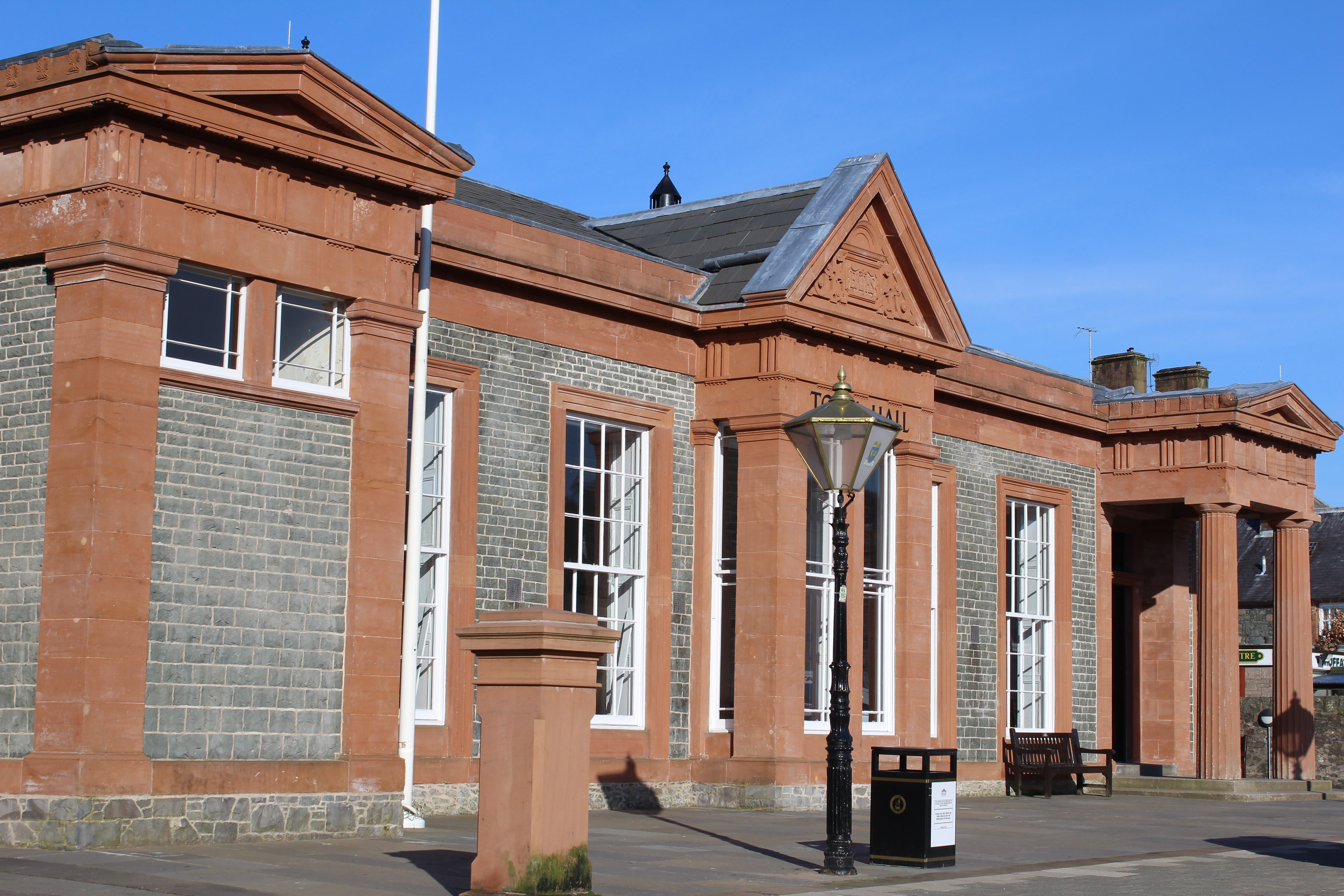
Moffat Town Hall

From 1633 Moffat began to grow from a small village into a popular spa town. The sulphurous and saline waters of Moffat Spa were believed to have healing properties, specifically curative for skin conditions, gout, rheumatism and stomach complaints. In 1730 these were complemented by the addition of iron springs. During the Victorian era the high demand led to the water being piped down from the well to a tank in Tank Wood and on to a specially built bath house in the town centre (Moffat Town Hall).

The population of Moffat at the time of the 1841 census was 1,413 inhabitants.

Luxurious hotels sprang up to accommodate the increasing numbers of tourists. One such hotel opened during Moffat's heyday in 1878, Moffat's Hydropathic hotel was destroyed in a fire in 1921.

The old well was refurbished in the mid 1990s, and is still accessible by vehicle and foot. The water smells very strongly of sulphur, with deposits on the walls and well itself. At the grand reopening of the well, people visiting were encouraged to drink a glass full.

The well can be reached by following Haywood Road and climbing up Tank Wood (on the right at the top): the path at the end was the original route to the well. An alternative is to drive or walk up Well Road, and eventually, one reaches the Well Cottage and the car park for the well. As stated, when the water was first piped into town for the baths, it was pumped uphill to a tank in the appropriately named Tank Wood, before travelling back downhill to the bath house.

Larchhill Well was a chalybeate well located on Old Well Road near Wellwoodhead Cottage. The well is no longer visible.

=== Origin of the name ===
The name of the town Moffat is the anglicised form of an endonym, of Gaelic origin. This quasi-place-name has been theorized to be translated as "the long plain," which could be derived from two elements: magh ("plain") and fada ("long"). The area of Moffat lies at the head of the plain of Annandale which stretches south as far as the eye can see from the hills above Moffat.

== Governance ==
Moffat is in the parliamentary constituency of Dumfriesshire, Clydesdale and Tweeddale, David Mundell is the current Conservative Party member of parliament.

It is part of the South Scotland region in the Scottish Parliament, being in the constituency of Dumfriesshire. Oliver Mundell of the Conservatives is the MSP.

Prior to Brexit, for the European Parliament its residents voted to elect MEPs for the Scotland constituency.

== Wool trade ==
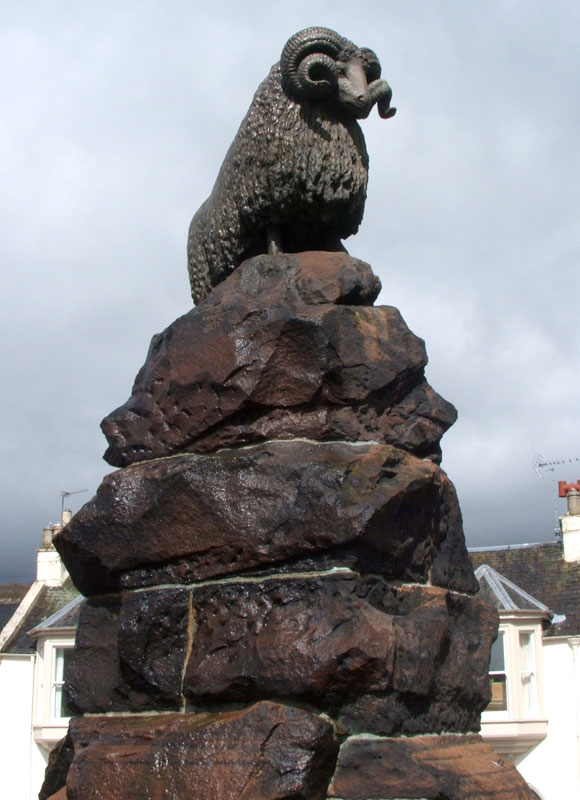
Ram statue

Moffat was a notable market in the wool trade, and this is commemorated with a statue of a ram by William Brodie in the town's marketplace. The ram was presented to the town by William Colvin, a local businessman, in 1875. The ram's ears are missing, as they have been since it was first presented.

== Famous and infamous visitors ==
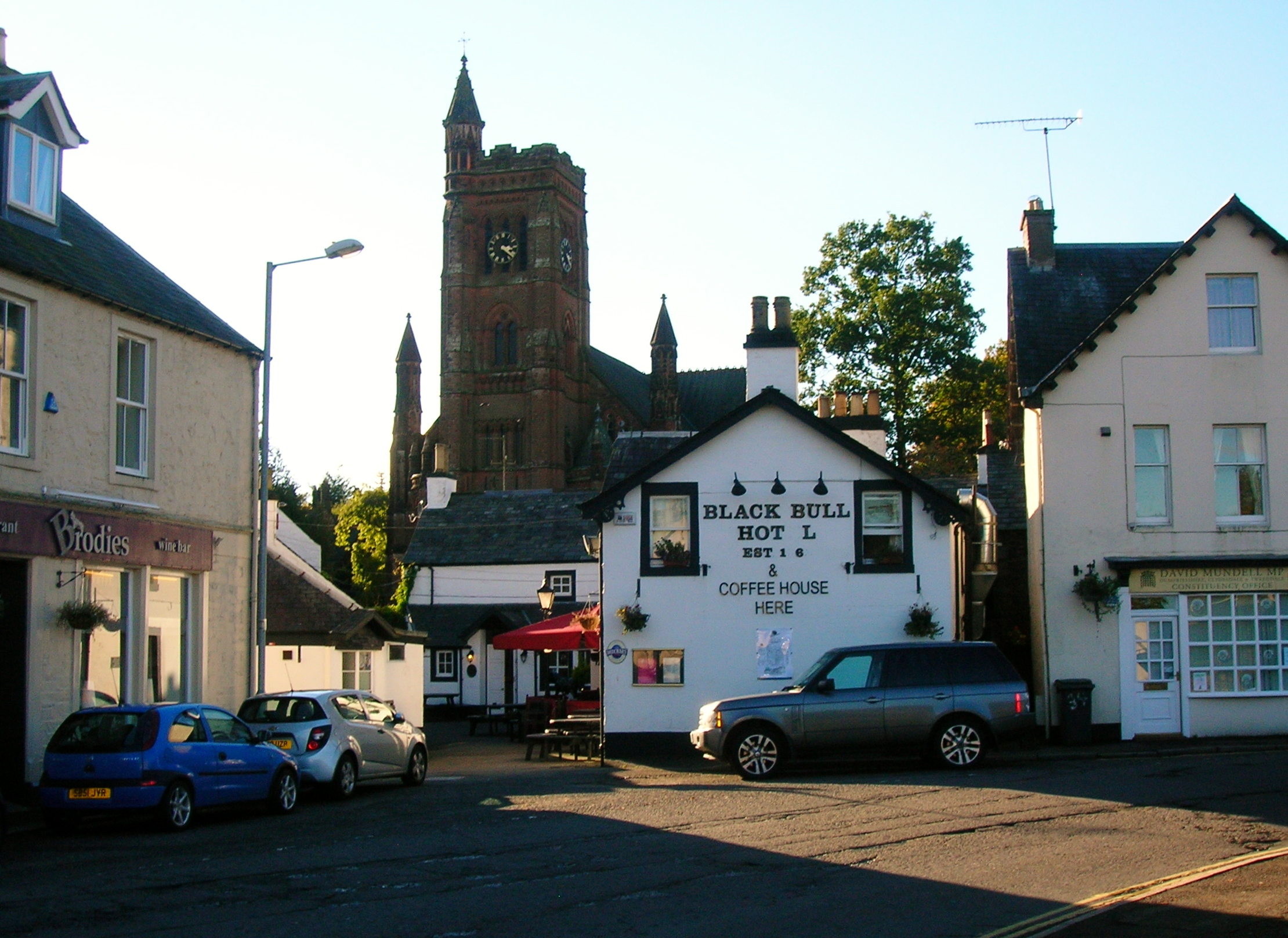
Robert Burns' haunt, the Black Bull Hotel.

Robert Burns came for the waters and frequented the local bars.

The infamous murderer William Hare may have stayed in the Black Bull Hotel during his escape to Ireland, after turning King's evidence against William Burke in the Burke and Hare murders.

John Loudon McAdam, Scottish engineer and road-builder, died in Moffat and is buried there.

In 1935, the remains of the victims of the Lancaster murderer, Dr Buck Ruxton, were found in a stream near The Devil's Beef Tub. A landmark case in legal history, it was the first in which the murderer was successfully convicted using the type of highly sophisticated forensic techniques which are taken for granted in the 21st century. The bridge at the top is still used to this day - near the very top it is a switchback that is not quite wide enough for two vehicles to pass on. The area is colloquially known as "Ruxton's Dump". The bridge from which Ruxton threw the parcelled remains has been straightened and widened; Gardenholme Linn, the deep wooded defile into which the packages were thrown is on the east side of the road (A701).

Samuel Wallace, a Victoria Cross recipient, died in the town.

== Tourism ==
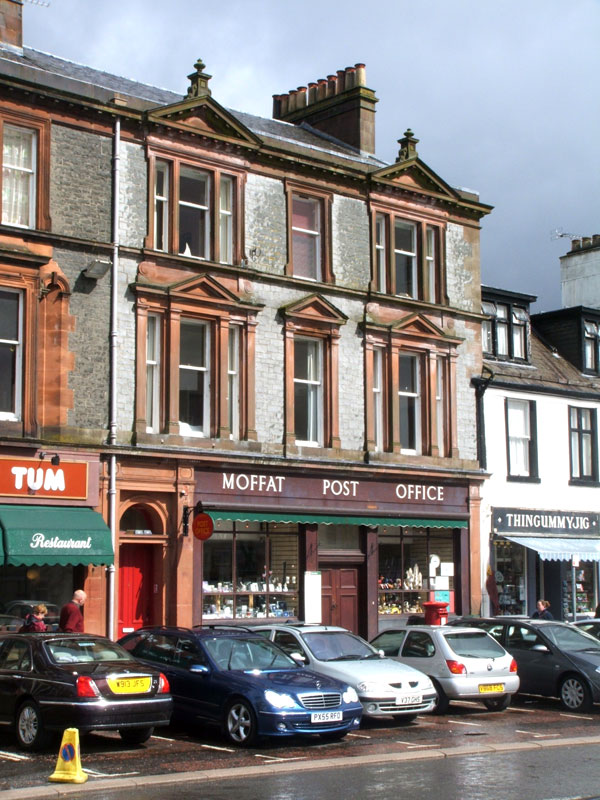
Post Office

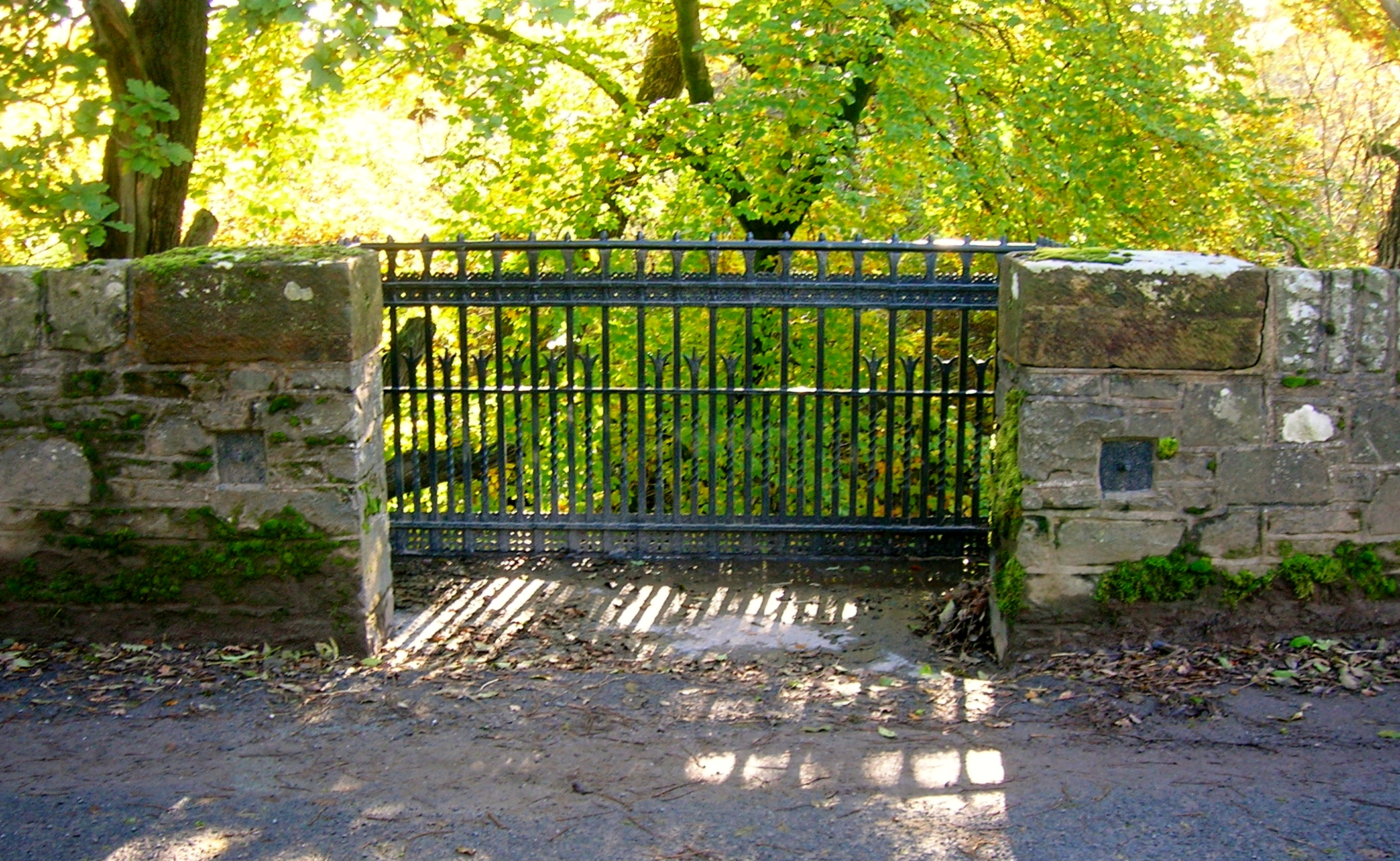
Observation platform on the Archbank Bridge near Moffat Well.

The town attracts many tourists all year round, both as visitors and as walkers in the surrounding hills. Notable buildings include the Annandale Arms Hotel and Restaurant which has been awarded several AA rosettes, Real and Local Food medals and four stars from Food Review Scotland.

Shops include the Moffat Toffee Shop and The Edinburgh Woollen Mill, while its restaurants and cafes include The Bombay Cuisine, Claudio's, Arietes, The Rumblin' Tum, The Balmoral and the Buccleuch Arms Hotel and Restaurant. The Buccleuch has also been awarded Gold in Visitscotland's Green Tourism Business Scheme.

Moffat also has a recreation park with a boating pond and a memorial to Air Chief Marshal Hugh Dowding.

There is an official Camping and Caravanning Club campsite (for tents, caravans and motorhomes) that is open all year as of 13 March 2008. This is situated next to the Hammerlands Centre - a combination garden centre, gift shop, restaurant, fish farm and children's play area with farmyard animals.

For walkers there is also the Gallow Hill. Moffat is also situated only a few miles from the Southern Upland Way where it passes through Beattock, and the Sir Walter Scott Way starts here.

Northeast of Moffat is the Grey Mare's Tail waterfall, this hanging-valley waterfall is 60m tall and lies within a nature reserve.

=== International Dark Sky Place ===
Moffat was designated as an International Dark Sky Community. It has an observatory that can be used and booked by the public, either for their own telescopes or to use the installed scope.

== Education ==
Moffat Academy teaches pupils of Nursery, Primary and Secondary School age; there are currently just over 520 pupils taught at the school. It was sited in its former location in the north of the town from 1834. In February 2010 the school moved to a new site in the south-east of the town on Jeff Brown Drive.

== Sport and recreation ==
Moffat RFC caters for all ages. The 1st XV plays in the Scottish Rugby Union league structure. They are also known as "The Rams" after the statue in the High Street. The ground wholly owned by the club is situated at The Holm, Selkirk Road.

Moffat's main football club is Upper Annandale F.C., who represent the town in the South of Scotland Football League.

Moffat Golf Club was founded in 1884. In 1904, Ben Sayers of North Berwick was invited to design the present 18-hole course. Located high on Coats Hill overlooking the town, it is some 670 feet above sea level.

A 53-mile (85 km) long-distance walking route called Annandale Way running through Annandale (from the source of the River Annan to the sea) was opened in September 2009. The route passes very close to the town of Moffat, and a diversion from it into the town adds very little in distance.

The nearby Moffat Hills offer many walking routes, and the town itself is the closest base for access to these hills.

== Transport ==
Moffat is near the A74(M) motorway which runs to the south and west of the town.

Between 1883 and 1964, Moffat had its own railway station at the end of a short 1 mile (1.6 km) branch line from Beattock railway station on the West Coast Main Line. The passenger service on the branch was withdrawn in 1954, and freight services in 1964. Nearby Beattock station lasted until 1972. The nearest railway station to Moffat today is at Lockerbie.

== Notable people ==
- Danny Bhoy (born 1975), comedian.
- Eleanor Bor (1898–1957), British writer.
- Sir Thomas Bouche (1822–1880), civil engineer and designer of the first Tay Bridge.
- William Carruthers (1830–1922), botanist.
- William Dickson (1751–1823), was secretary to the Governor of Barbados for 13 years. There he witnessed slaves being brutally treated. From January to March 1792 he toured Scotland from Kirkcudbright to Nairn presenting evidence of the evils of the slave trade. This evidence was summarised in 'An abstract of the evidence delivered before a select committee of the House of Commons'. He wrote a book on the subject entitled Mitigation of Slavery.
- Air Chief Marshal Hugh Dowding (1882–1970), commander of RAF Fighter Command during the Battle of Britain, was born at St Ninian's School, Moffat in 1882. The former school is now sheltered housing for RAF veterans. There is a memorial to Dowding in Station Park. It is in a local red sandstone with a bronze memorial tablet on the wall and RAF crest badges on the flanking 'wings'. The architect and designer was D. Bruce Walker and the sculptor Scott Sutherland RSA.
- James Fraser, Scottish international footballer,
- Ellen or Helen Hyslop (1766–1852), was said to have had a daughter, Helen or Ellen Armstrong, fathered by the poet Robert Burns. The gravestone of the mother and her daughter is to be found in the old cemetery. Unusually for Victorian memorials, the name of the father is not recorded on the stone. Ellen died aged 87 and her daughter lived until the age of 98.
- Stephen Mitchell (1789–1874), Tobacco Baron and philanthropist. Founder of the Mitchell Library in Glasgow. Lived and died in Moffat 1869-74.
- James D. Murray (born 1931), mathematical biologist.
- James B Niven (1861–1933), Scottish international footballer.
- Ivor Robson, the official starter for the Open golf tournament from 1975 to 2015.
- D. E. Stevenson (1892–1973), author and cousin to Robert Louis Stevenson.

== Twin town ==
Moffat is twinned with:

- Montreuil-sur-Ille, Ille-et-Vilaine, France

== See also ==
- Moffat Museum
