= Giffen railway station =

Former railway station in Scotland

Giffen
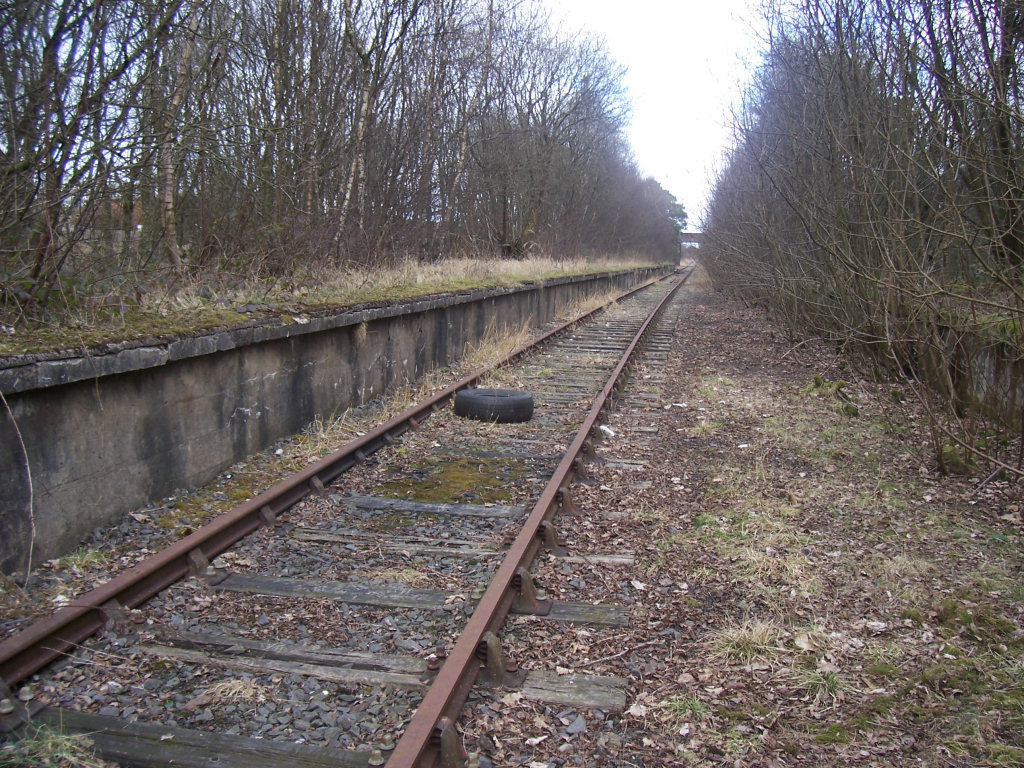
- The remains of Giffen station in 2006

General information
- Location: Near Barrmill, Ayrshire; Scotland
- Coordinates: 55.7202°N 4.6125°W
- Grid reference: NS359505
- Platforms: 3

Other information
- Status: Disused

History
- Original company: Lanarkshire and Ayrshire Railway
- Pre-grouping: Caledonian Railway
- Post-grouping: London, Midland and Scottish Railway

Key dates
- 3 September 1888: Opened as Kilbirnie Junction
- 1 October 1889: Renamed Giffen
- 4 July 1932: Closed
Location

Giffen railway station was a railway station approximately one mile south-west of the village of Barrmill, North Ayrshire, Scotland. The station was part of the Lanarkshire and Ayrshire Railway.

== History ==
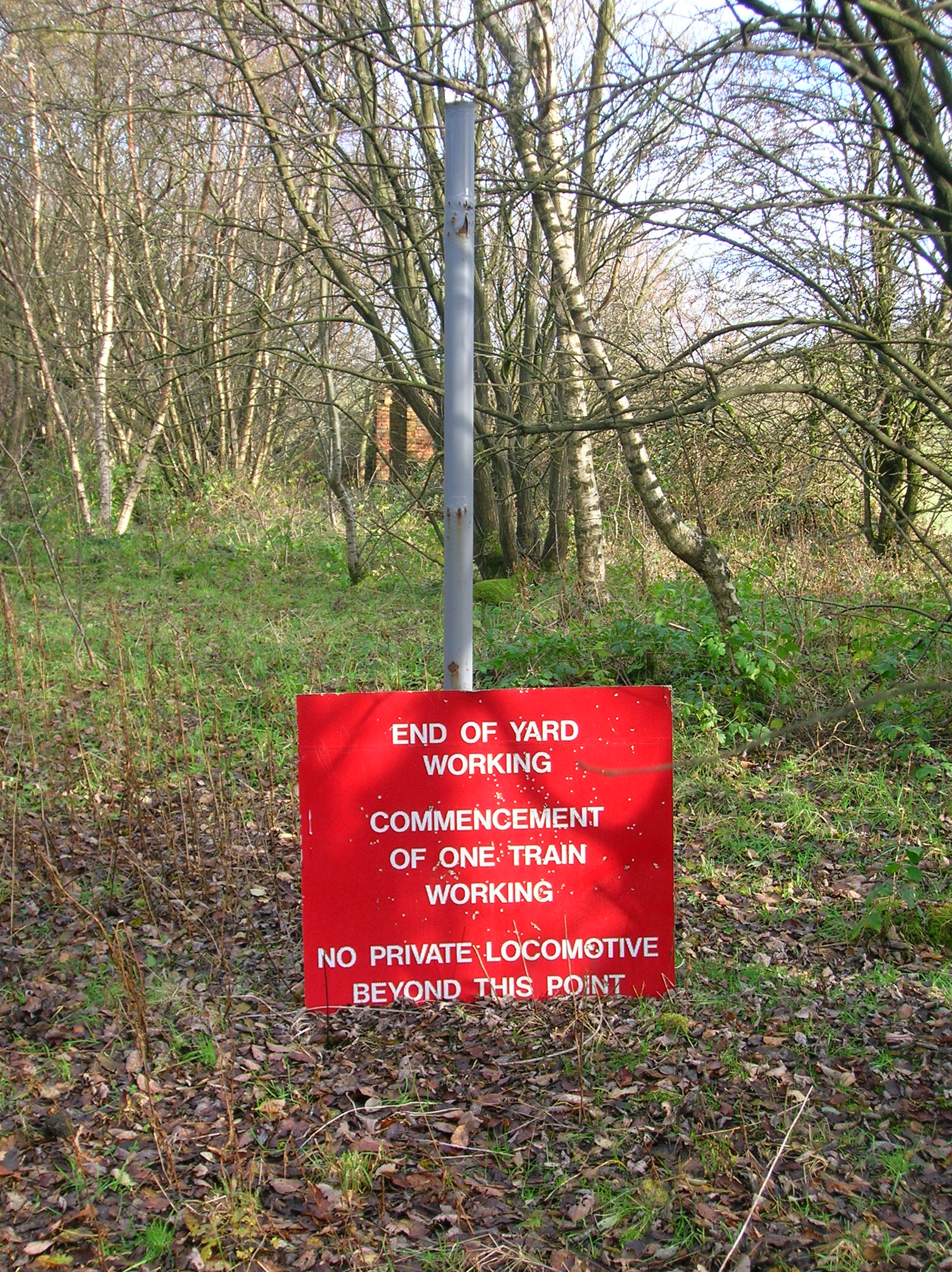
Old sign for munitions traffic operations

The station opened on 3 September 1888 and was known as Kilbirnie Junction, however it was renamed Giffen on 1 October 1889. Giffen had three platforms, a small station building, and at one point at least seven members of staff. A one time station master was Mr Willie Haining and his son Billy was born in the station master's house in April 1934. The station had large concrete letters spelling out the name with, oddly, a triskelion or Isle of Man symbol set between the two words. Sunday school pupils would walk to the station from Barrmill for a day out in Saltcoats. Giffen station closed on 4 July 1932.

Today (2011) the three platforms of Giffen station still exist (although overgrown and in disrepair), and a single intact railway line runs through the station from Lugton to DM Beith. This track was used regularly to transport supplies into the base, however the track became disused in 1996 and the majority is now overgrown. The connection with the main line at Lugton was lifted in 2008 as part of the track doubling operations on the Lugton to Stewarton section of the Glasgow to Carlisle via Dumfries railway line.

The track near Lugton did see one more recent use on 2 September 2000 when it was used in a rail crash simulation in order to test emergency response times as a result of the Paddington rail crash in 1999.

A footpath on old OS maps as running from the nearby Nettlehirst house down to the station and then to the Gatend and South Barr road via an overbridge.

A feature of WWII was the use of the line for what locals called the night time 'Ghost Trains' that carried injured service personnel to the Glasgow hospitals from where they had been landed at the port of Ardrossan.

== Views of the station area ==
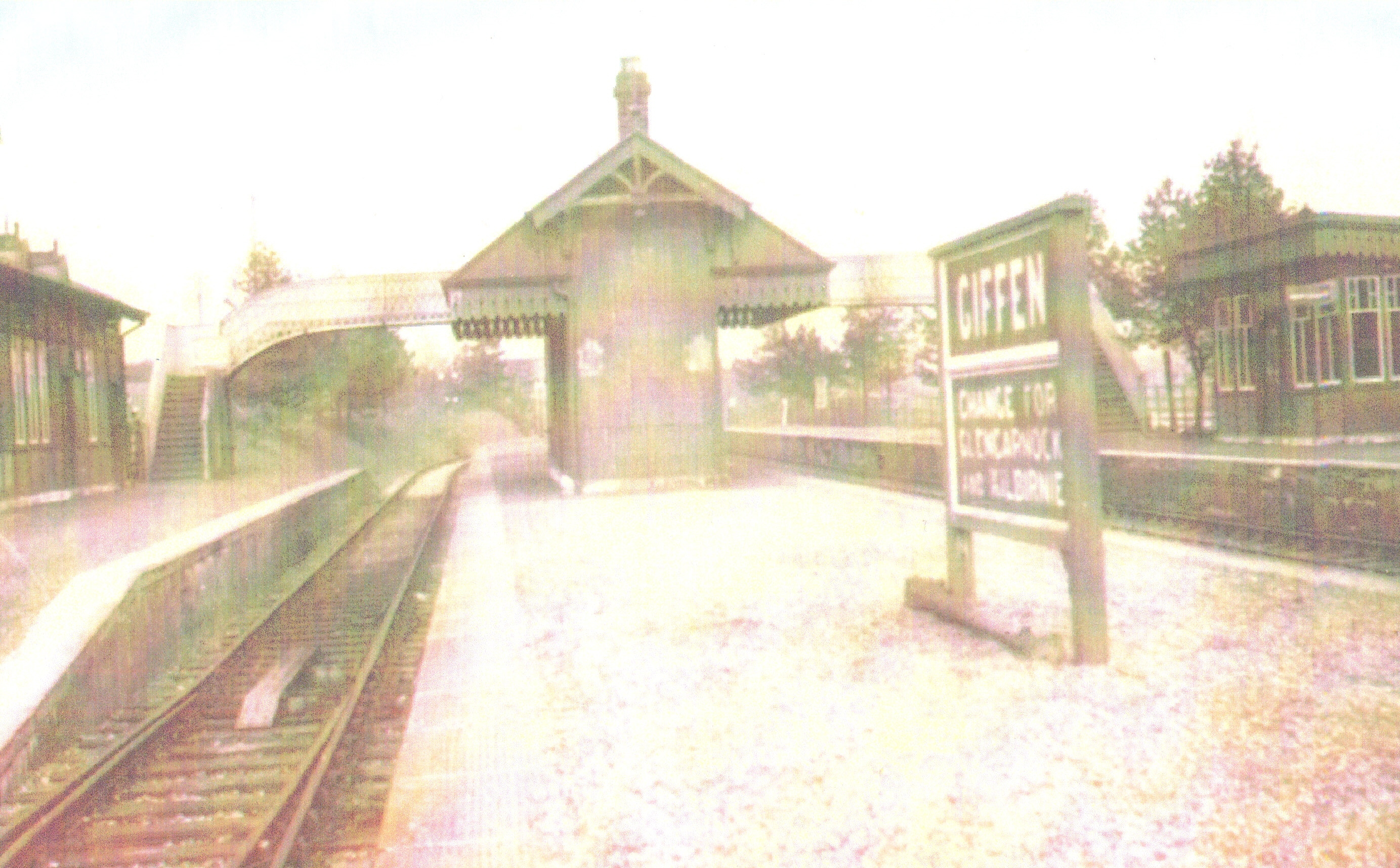
Giffen station in the late 19th century

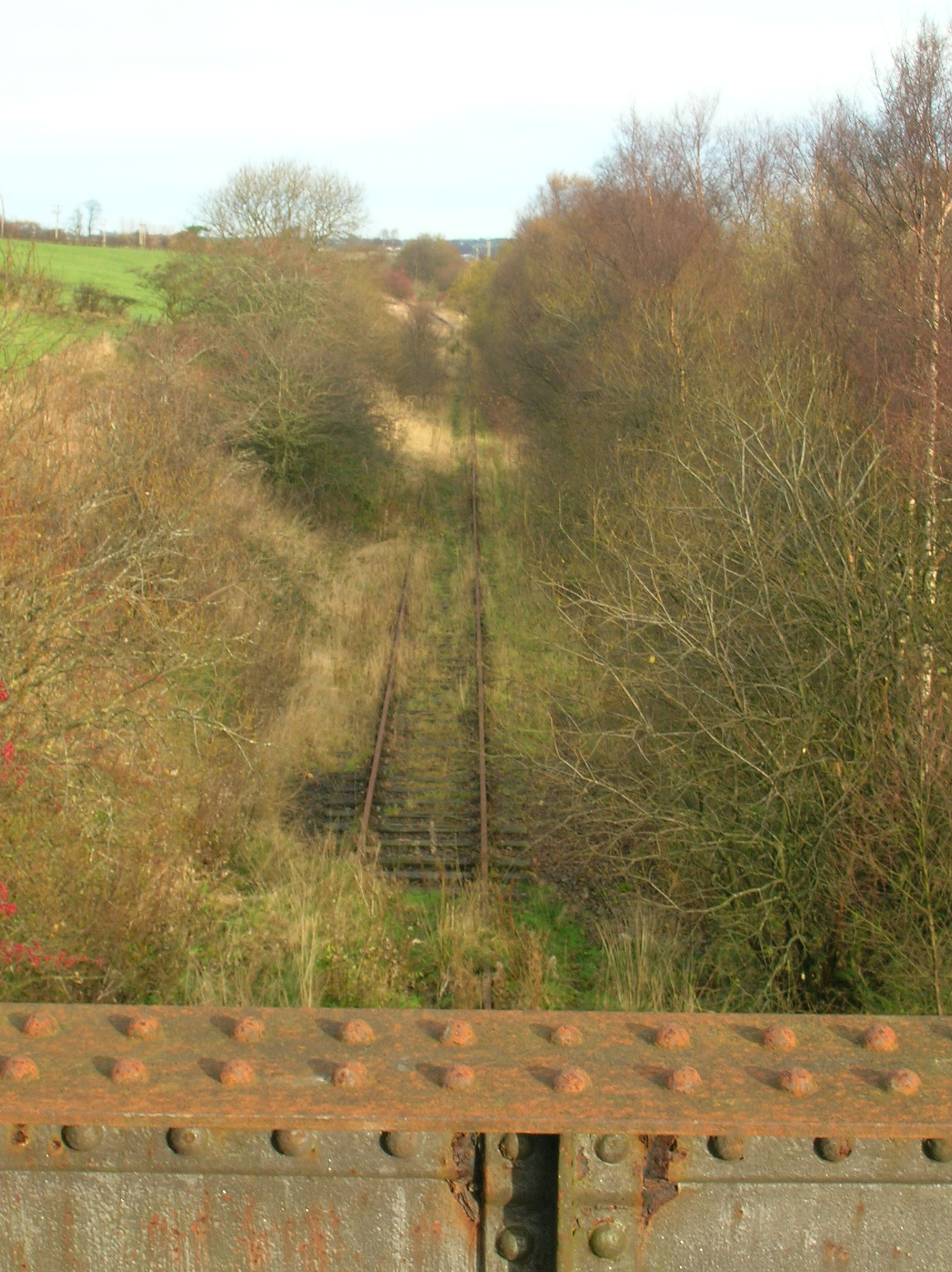
Looking towards Barrmill from the Giffen overbridge in 2008

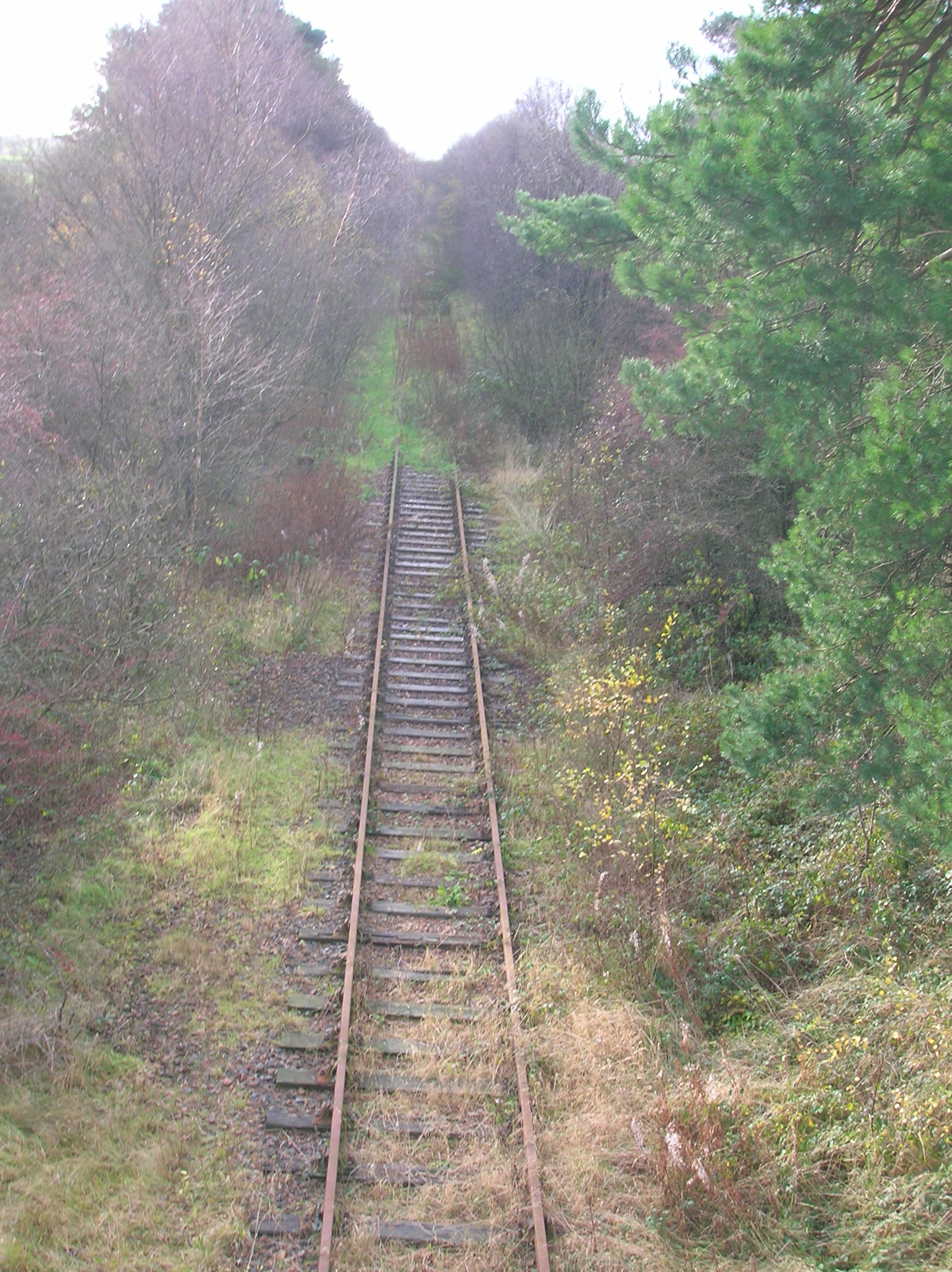
Giffen station from the overbridge in 2008

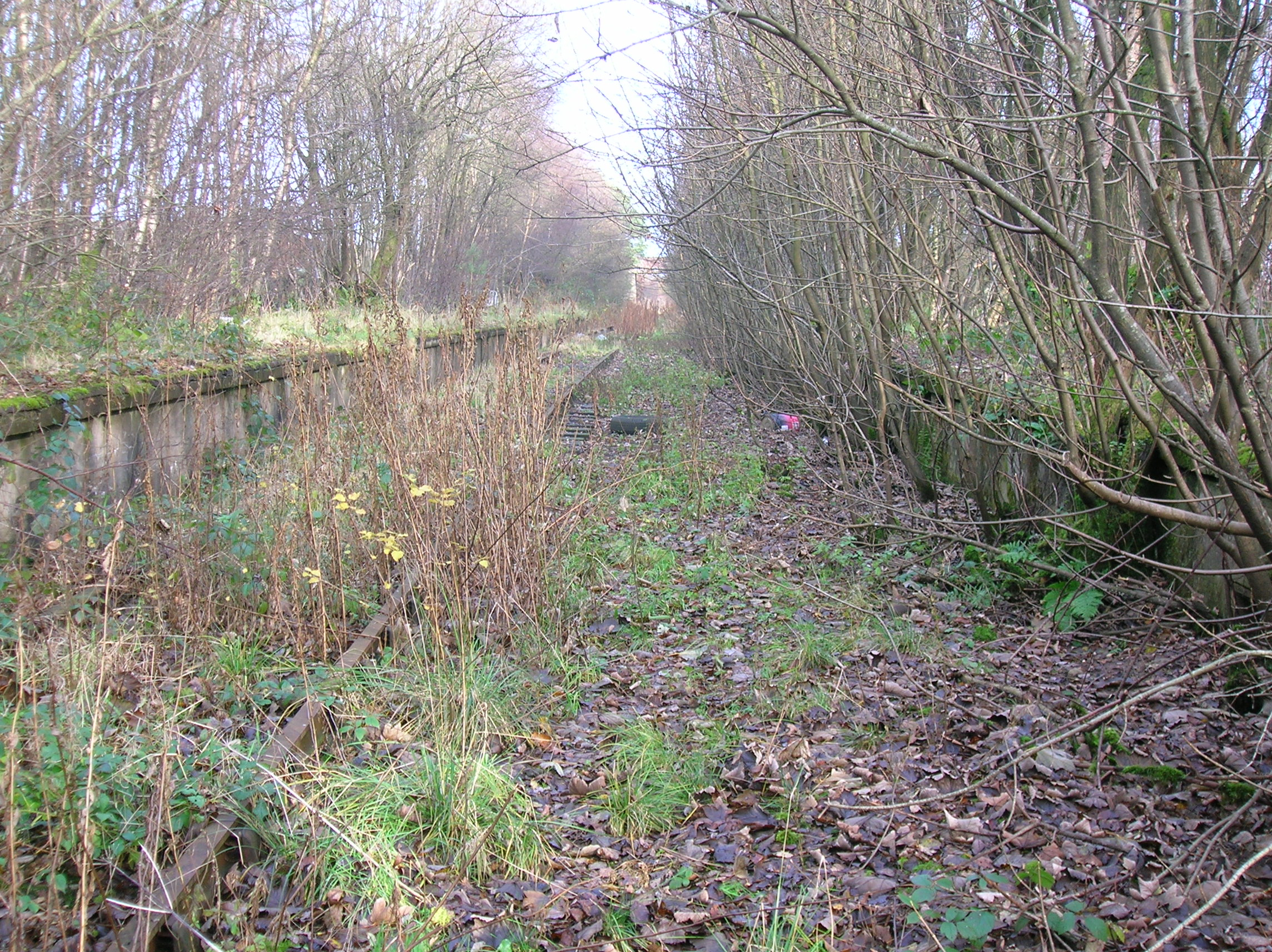
Giffen station looking towards Barrmill in 2008
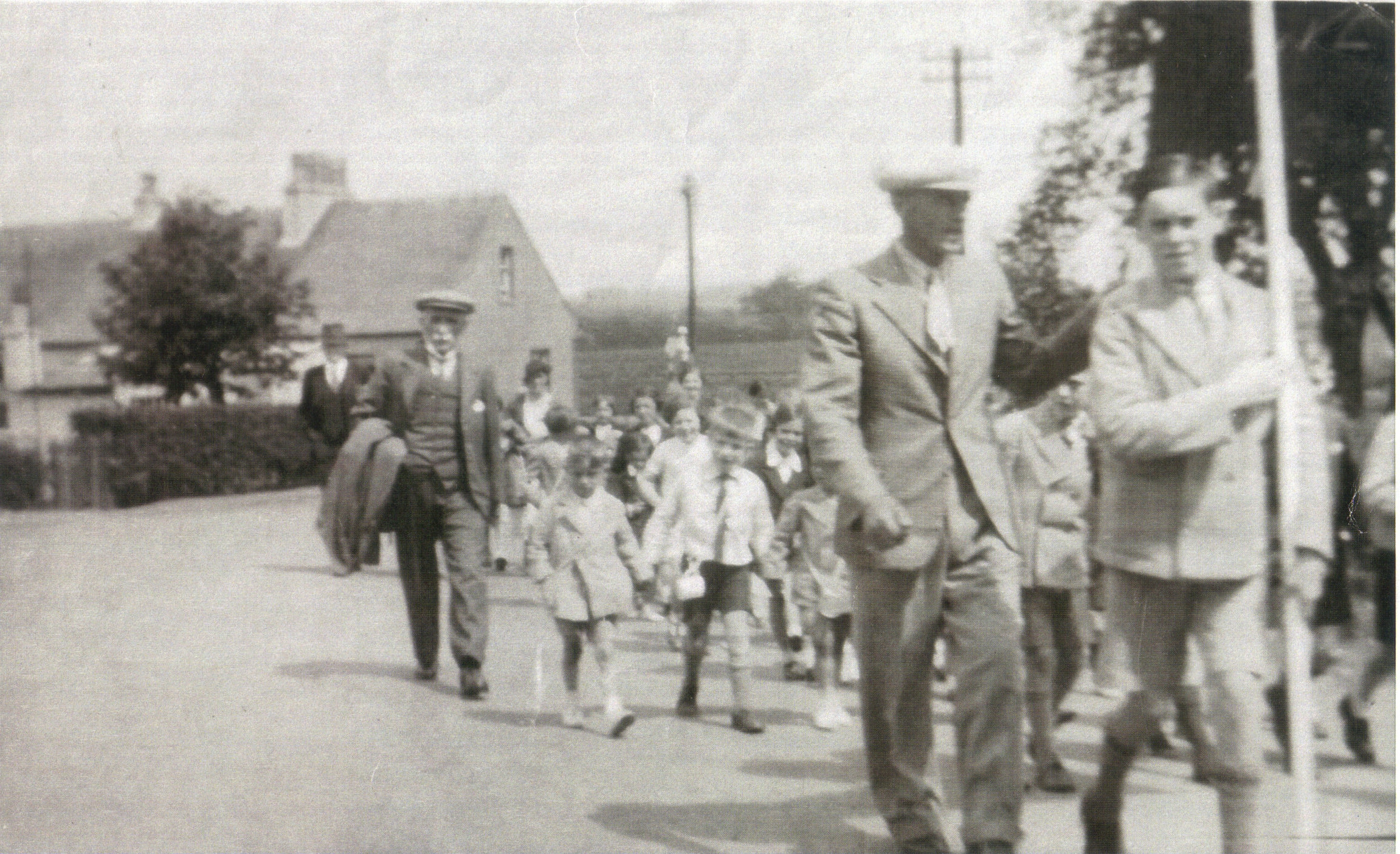
Sunday School group walking to Giffen station from Barrmill

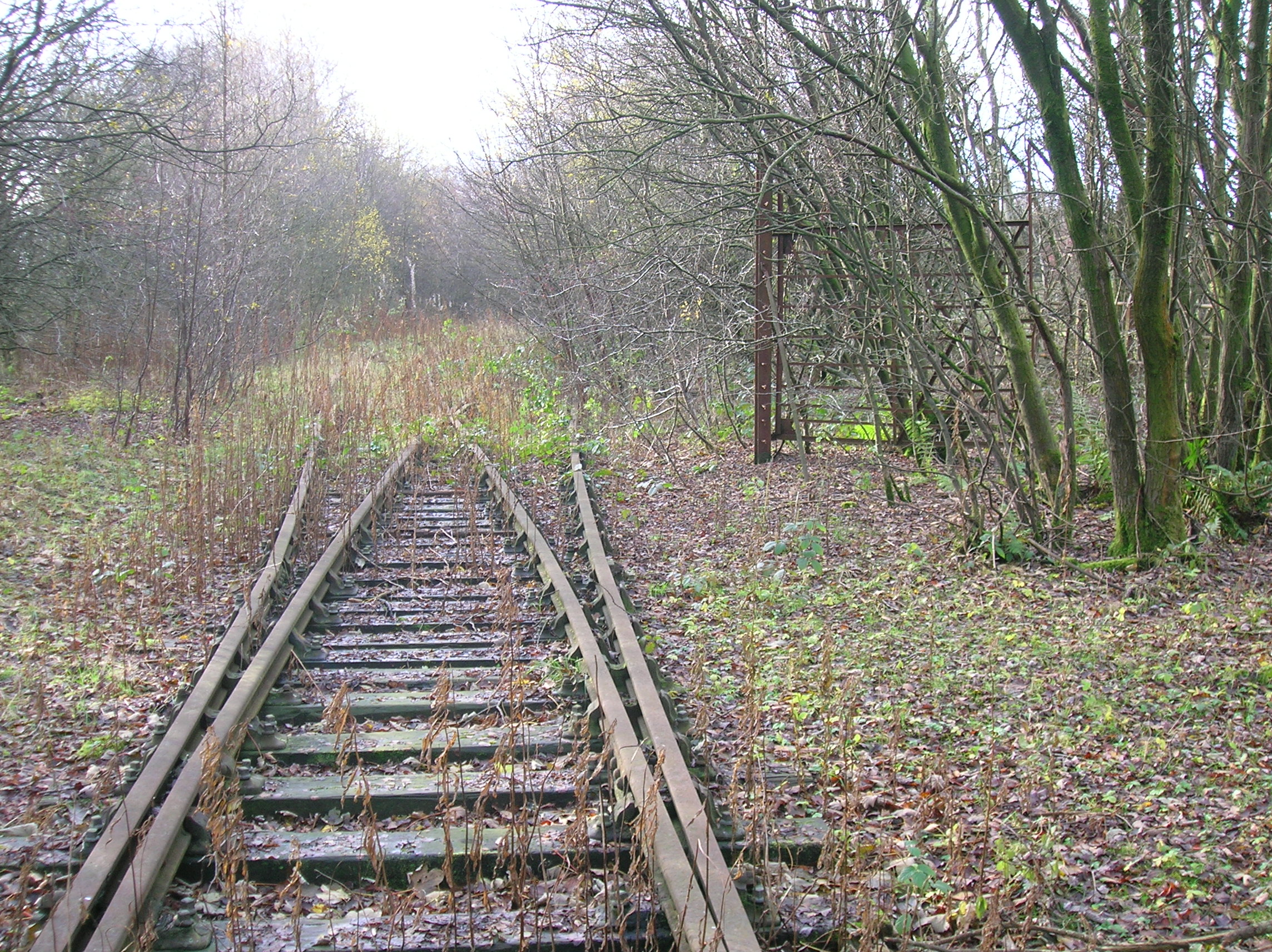
Pointwork and an old security gate in 2008

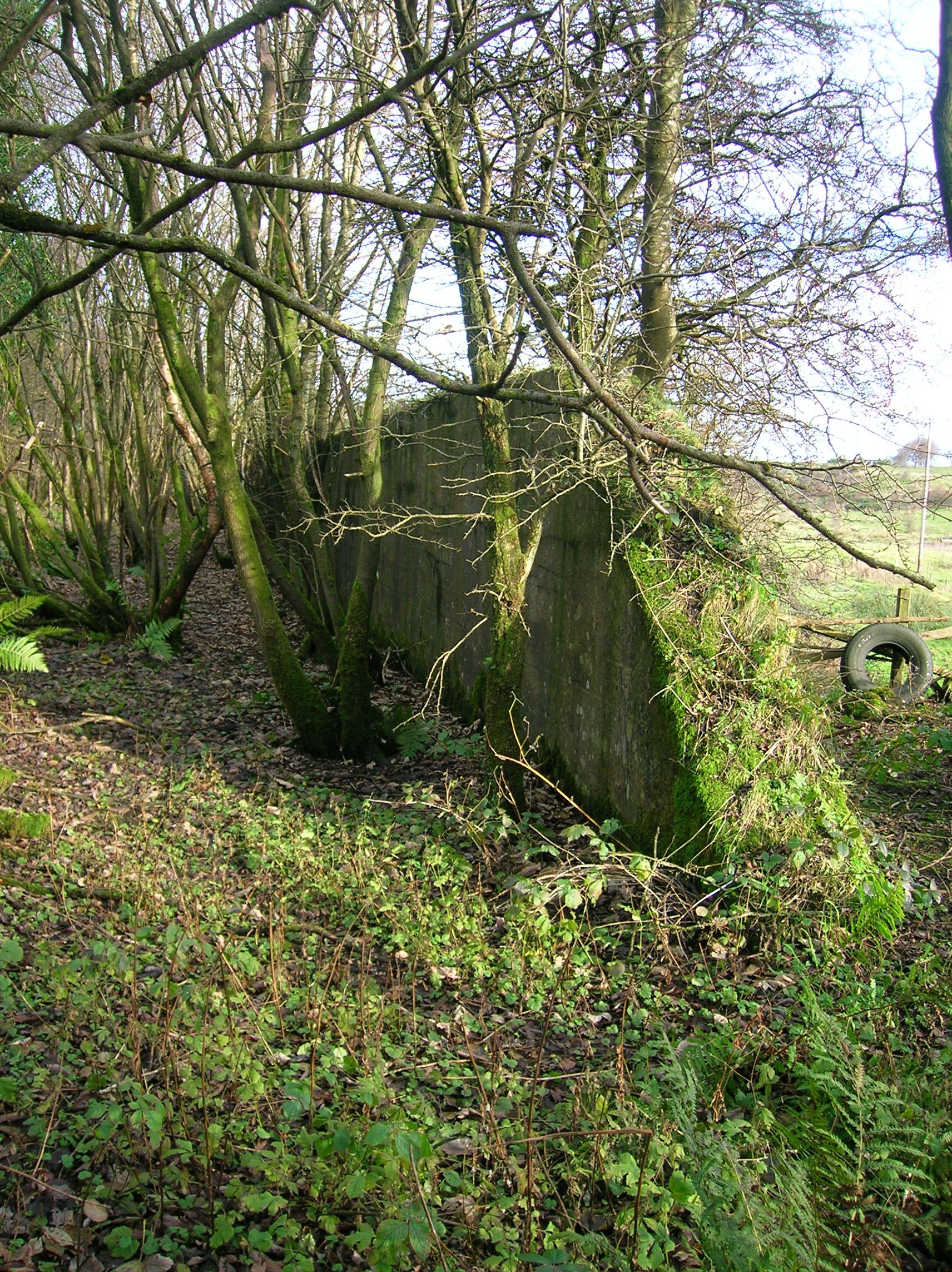
An old blast wall next to the station in 2008. The OS maps show that a railway line ran from near here to the Lime Kilns at Nettlehirst until at least 1912.

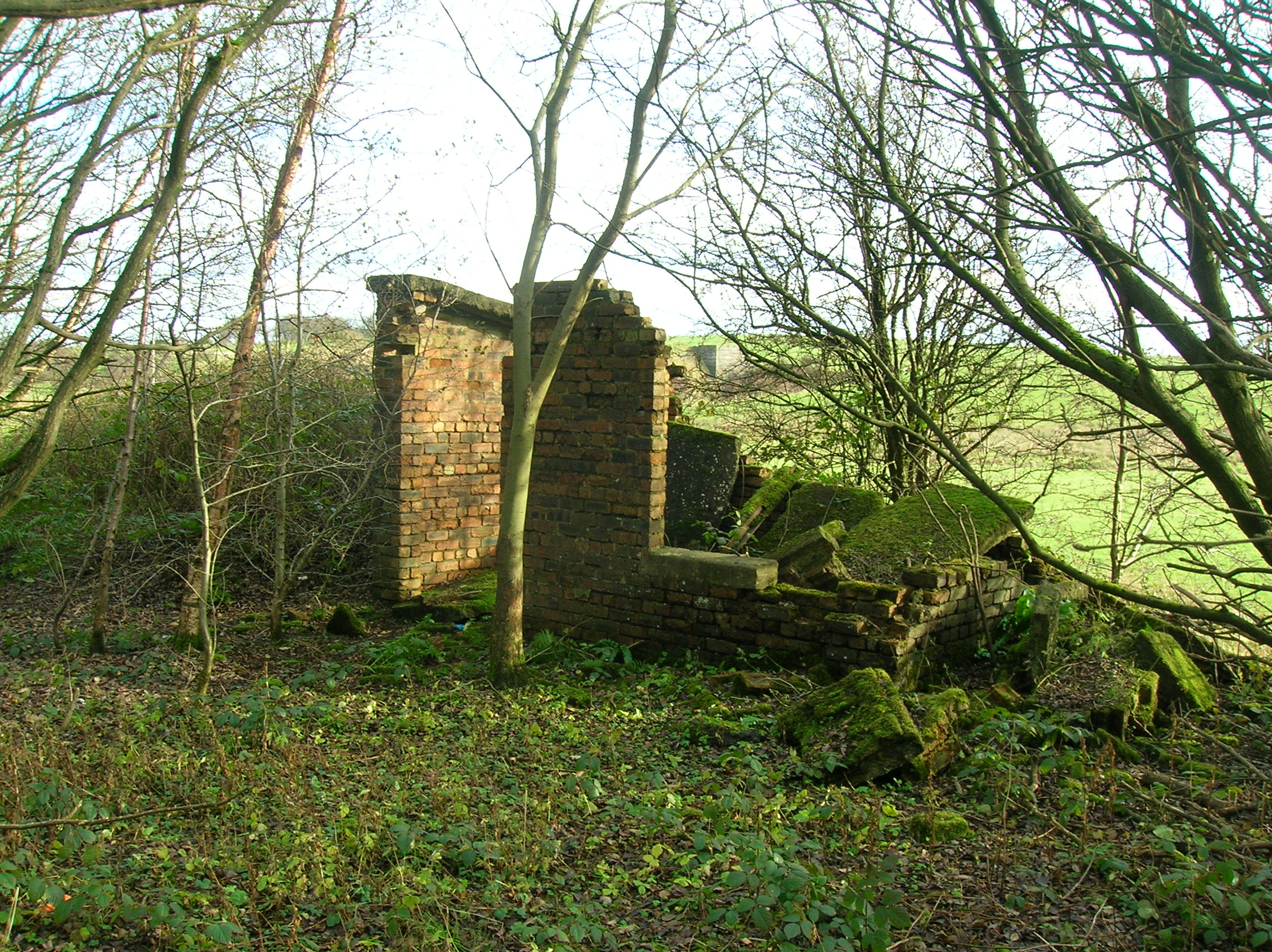
Workmen's hut near the blast wall in 2008. One of the old Nettlehirst Lime kilns is visible in the background.

=== Workings details ===
In 1907 the Caledonian Railway Working Timetable (WTT) states that in relation to the nearby Gree Goods station :

Brakesmen of Trains having work to do at this place must get the Key from him and hand it in on arrival at Giffen to the Station Master, who will return it by first train. The Signalman at Lugton Station Box will signal the train forward as per clause (b) of Block telegraph Regulations.

Preceding station	Historical railways	Following station
Brackenhills; Line and station closed	Caledonian Railway; Lanarkshire and Ayrshire Railway	Lugton; Line and station closed
Auchenmade; Line and station closed	Caledonian Railway; Lanarkshire and Ayrshire Railway	Lugton; Line and station closed
