= Gree Goods station =

Railway goods station in North Ayrshire, Scotland

Gree Goods
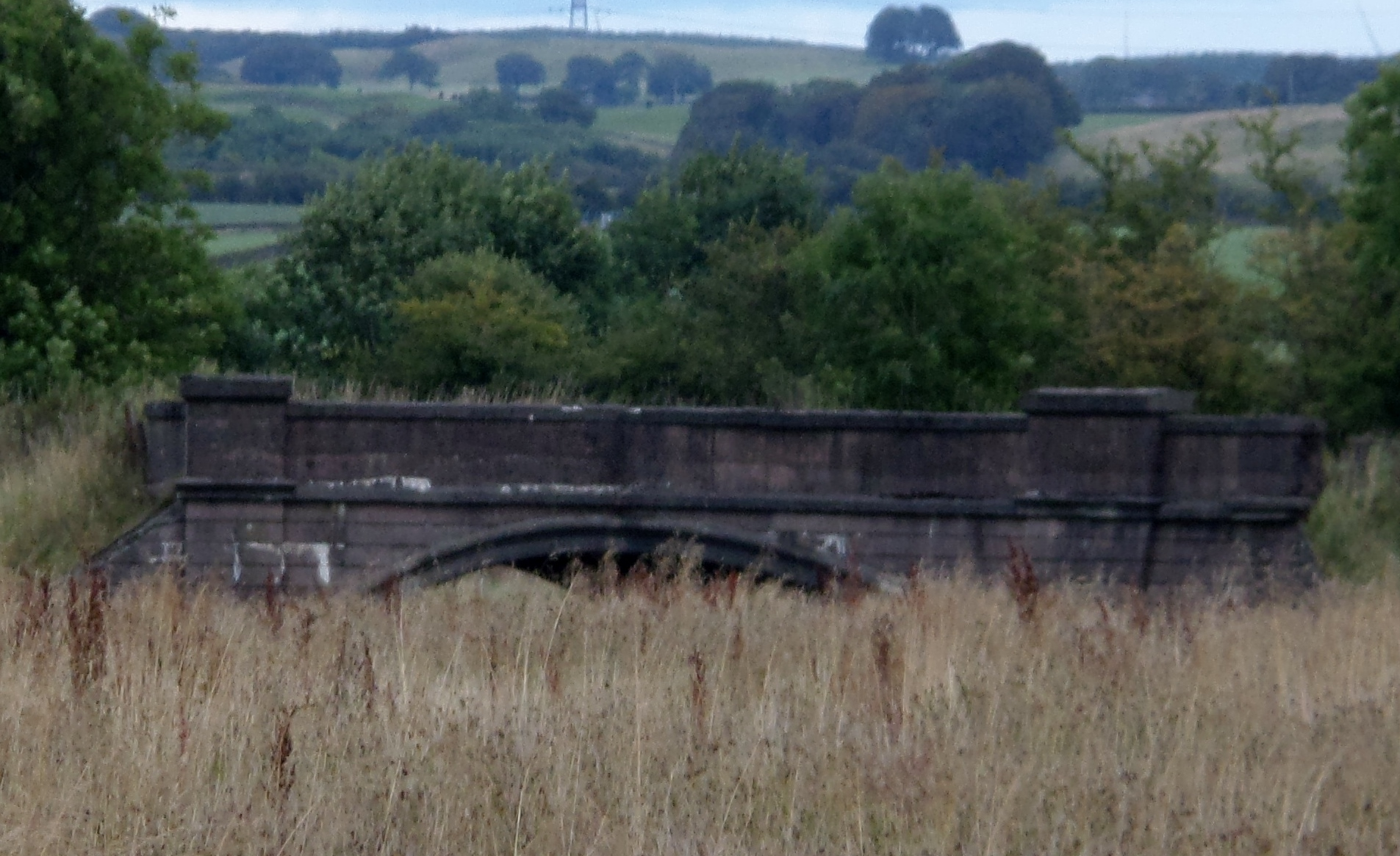
- Site of Gree Goods station and road overbridge

General information
- Location: Near Lugton, Ayrshire; Scotland
- Coordinates: 55.725376°N 4.567380°W
- Grid reference: NS388509
- Platforms: Goods station

Other information
- Status: Disused

History
- Original company: L&A
- Pre-grouping: CR
- Post-grouping: LMS

Key dates
- 1 May 1903: Opened
- Circa 1950: Goods services withdrawn
Location

Gree Goods station or Gree Depot as it was listed in the Caledonian Railway Working Timetable was a relatively short lived railway freight facility located approximately one miles south of Lugton on the A736 Lochlibo Road, North Ayrshire, Scotland. Gree Goods served the industrial and agricultural requirements for transportation in the vicinity, with the village of Burnhouse not far away, sitting on the crossroads to Barrmill, Dunlop and Irvine. Over Gree, High Gree, Nether Gree, Gree and Brownhills Farms were located nearby. Gree Goods was close to the Lugton East Junction, just south of the 11 arch Gree Viaduct. The nearest passenger station on the line north was Lugton High and to the south was Giffen.

Although a rather remote location today, the facility would have had freight transport business in the form of lime for the fields, cattle, horse and sheep movements, milk and cheese delivery, mining and quarrying related items, etc.

== Infrastructure ==
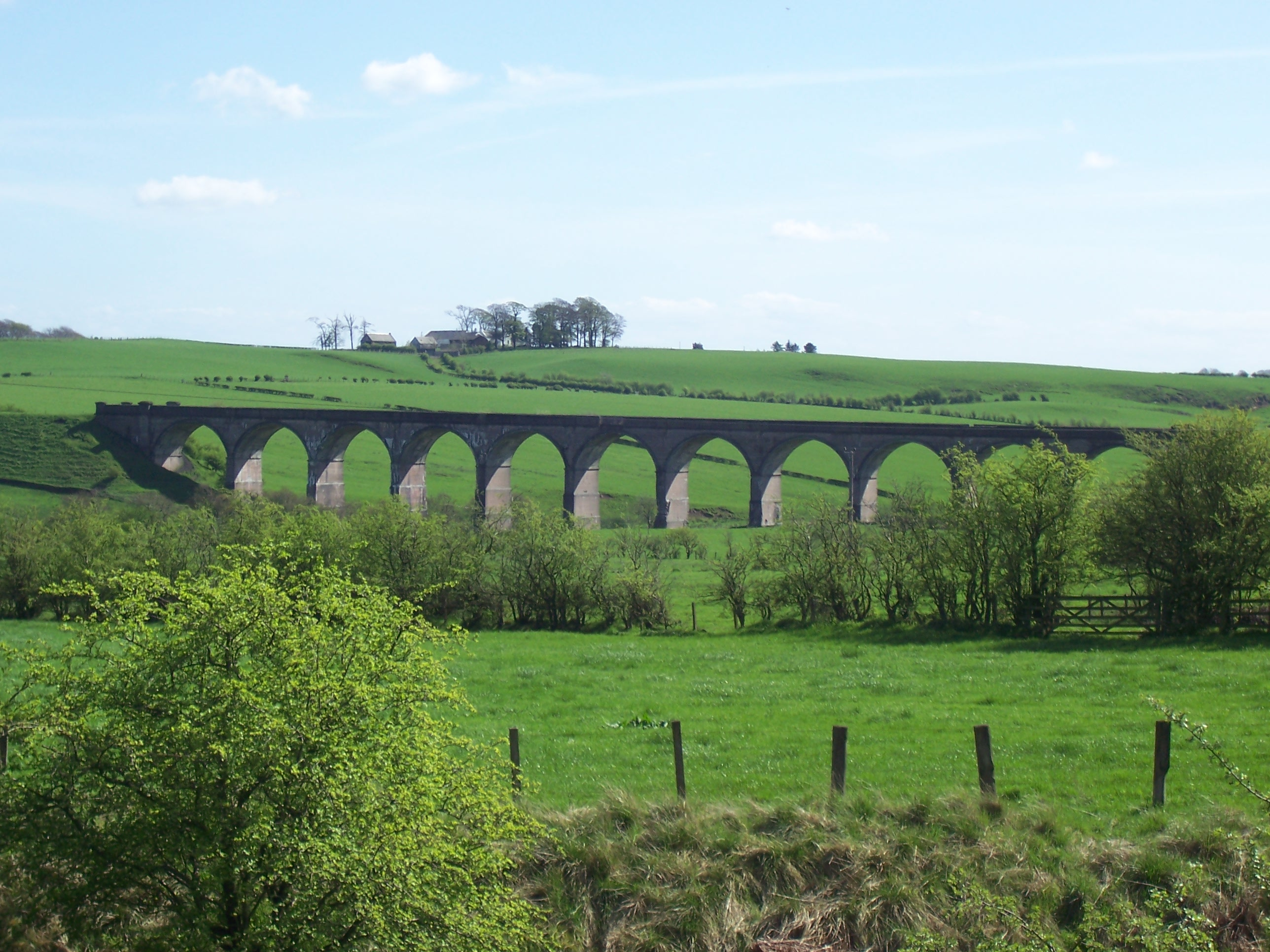
The old Gree Viaduct near Gree Goods station

The OS maps of 1896 does not show the goods station or main line and it was not until 1910 that a fairly basic infrastructure is indicated with the double track main line and a single siding running off to branch twice, two sidings running to a loading dock and a single siding running past a second loading dock to a point near the road access off the A736. A signal box was not present and only a possible ground frame and a lone signal post at the siding are shown. A crane is shown. The site was located in a cutting which had been expanded to contain the two loading docks, etc. By 1958 the tracks had all been lifted, including the main line.

Netherton Goods station was a similar goods only depot located near Netherton Farm on Springhill Road between Neilston and Patterton.

== History ==
Opened by the Lanarkshire and Ayrshire Railway, then joining the Caledonian Railway it became part of the London Midland and Scottish Railway during the Grouping of 1923.

Gree Goods station lay down the line that ran towards Barrmill and the station and junction of Giffen. It was supervised by staff at Lugton High Station. Trains ran along this line until 17 December 1950 when the line from Lugton High via Gree to Giffen Junction was taken out of use. By 1958 the Gree sidings had been lifted.

The goods station at Gree opened 1 May 1903 and had closed by 1950. A similar goods station was located down the line beyond Auchenmade station at Lissens.

=== Workings details ===
In 1907 the Caledonian Railway Working Timetable (WTT) shows that the 12.10pm goods from Gushetfaulds to Ardrossan via Cathcart worked Gree siding. The May 1915 'appendix' to the WTT states that - The Siding must only be worked during daylight and not during a Fog or Snowstorm. The Points Locking Frame is secured by a padlock. The Key of the Box in which the Points Locking Frame is placed, is in the custody of the Signalman at Lugton Station.

Brakesmen of Trains having work to do at this place must get the Key from him and hand it in on arrival at Giffen to the Station Master, who will return it by first train. The Signalman at Lugton Station Box will signal the train forward as per clause (b) of Block telegraph Regulations.

== The site today ==
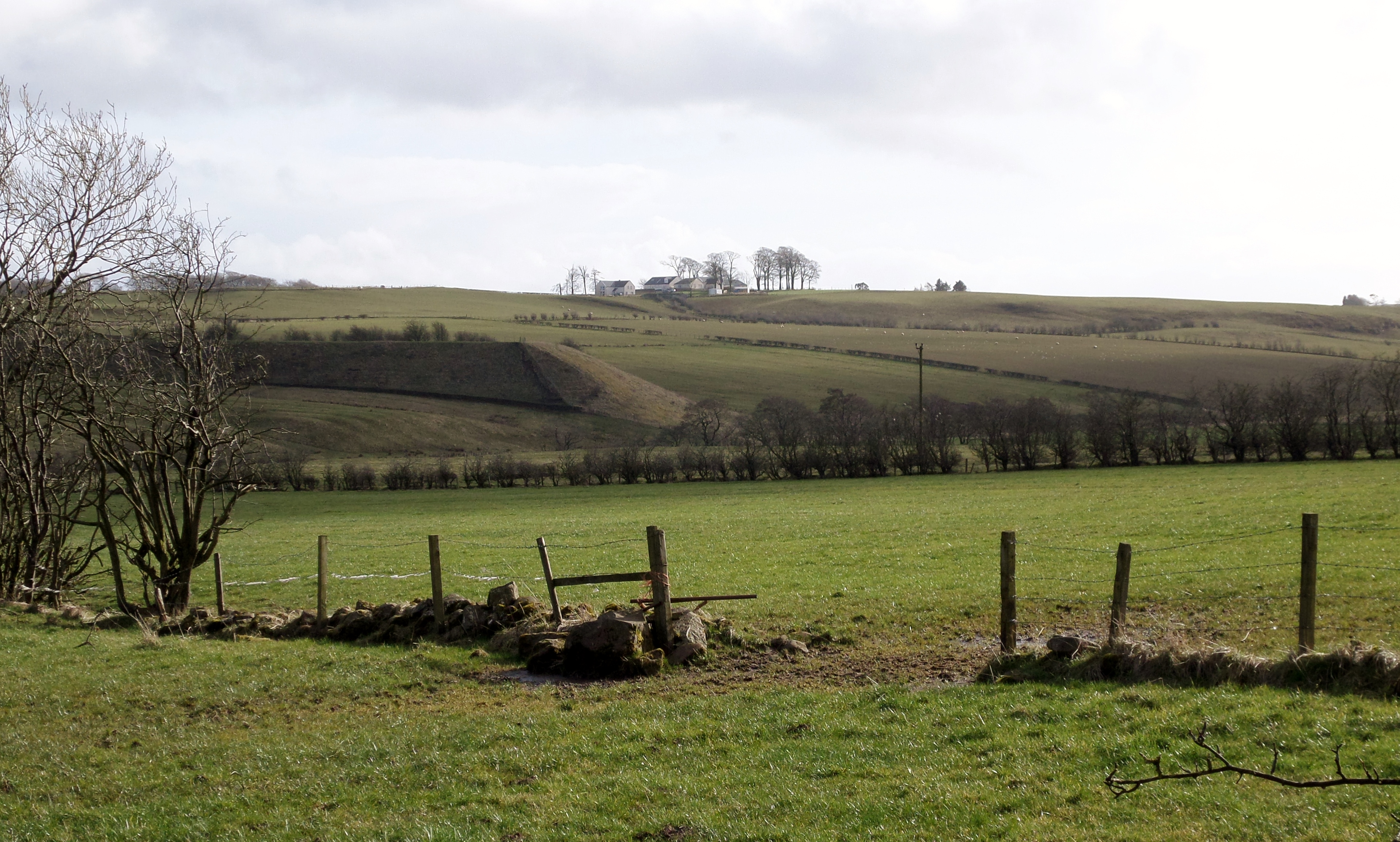
Site of the former Gree Viaduct in 2013

Railway workers cottages were never built at the site probably as the facility was small and this area had good transport being located on the A736 Lochlibo and the village of Lugton was nearby. The Gree Goods station site was located partly in a cutting and the whole site became an infill in the later 20th century so that nothing remains visible apart from the two typical 'Concrete Bob's' McAlpine's concrete road overbridges and the railway cutting on the other side of the minor road to Brownhill Farm. Gree Viaduct was demolished in 2002.

Preceding station	Historical railways	Following station
Giffen; Line and station closed	Caledonian Railway; Lanarkshire and Ayrshire Railway	Lugton High; Line and station closed
