= Lugton High railway station =

Railway station in East Ayrshire, Scotland

Lugton High
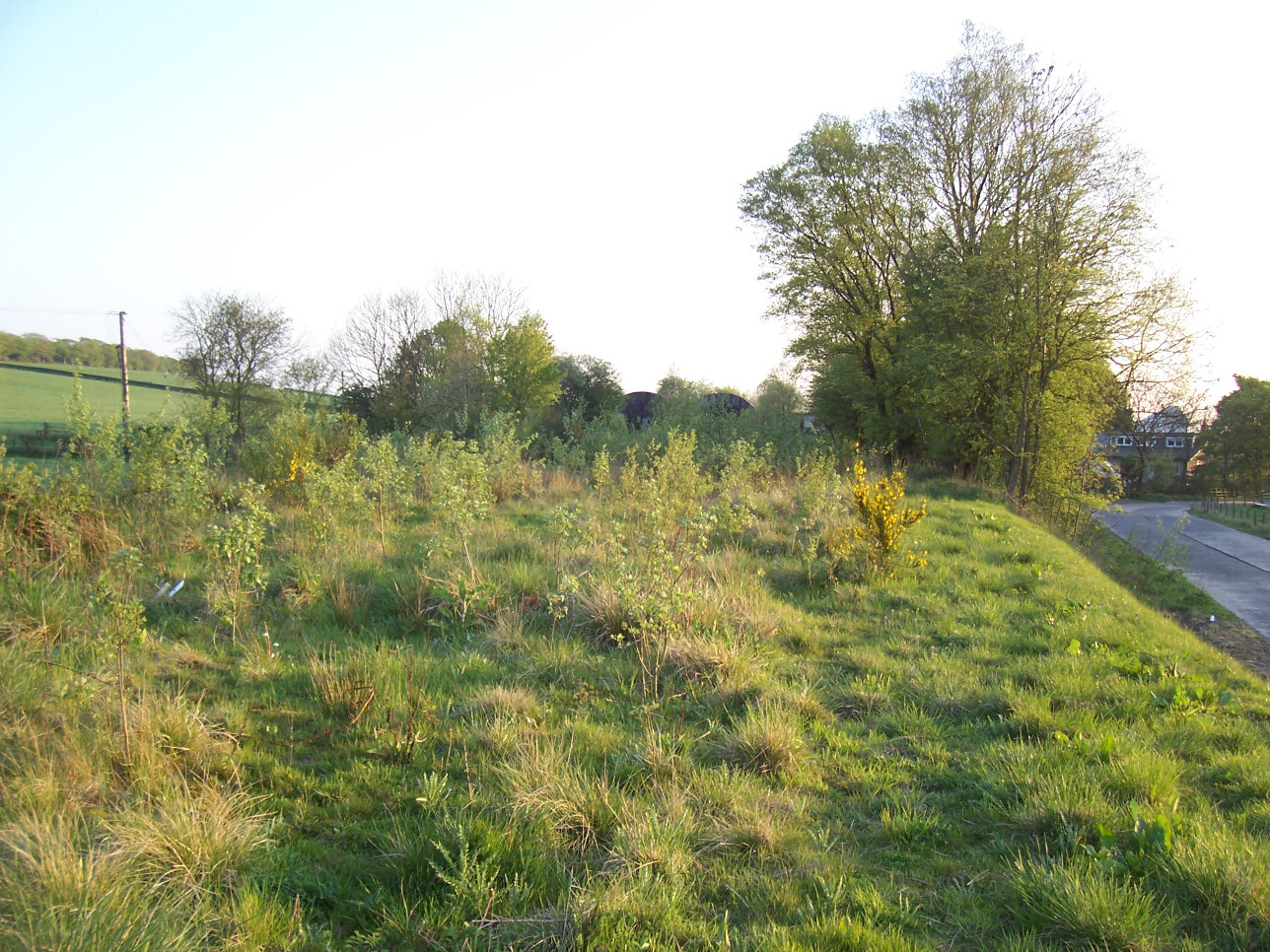
- The site of Lugton High in 2007

General information
- Location: Lugton, Ayrshire; Scotland
- Coordinates: 55.7417°N 4.5271°W
- Grid reference: NS414526
- Platforms: 2

Other information
- Status: Disused

History
- Original company: Lanarkshire and Ayrshire Railway
- Pre-grouping: Caledonian Railway
- Post-grouping: LMS

Key dates
- 1 May 1903: Opened as Lugton
- 1 January 1917: Closed
- 1 February 1919: Reopened
- 2 July 1924: Renamed Lugton High
- 4 July 1932: Closed to regular services
Location

Lugton High railway station was a railway station serving the hamlet of Lugton, East Ayrshire, Scotland as part of the Lanarkshire and Ayrshire Railway.

== History ==
The station opened on 1 May 1903 and was simply known as Lugton. It closed between 1 January 1917 and 2 March 1919 due to wartime economy, and upon the grouping of the L&AR into the London, Midland and Scottish Railway in 1923, it was renamed Lugton High on 2 June 1924. The station closed to passengers on 4 July 1932.

Little remains of this station today, aside from the stationmaster's house and related buildings, the abutments of a bridge crossing the A735 to the south, and a large embankment to the north.

Gree Goods station was located between Lugton and Barrmill, just to the south of the now demolished Gree Viaduct and near the clachan of that name.

Preceding station	Historical railways	Following station
Giffen; Line and station closed	Caledonian Railway; Lanarkshire and Ayrshire Railway	Uplawmoor; Line and station closed

== 2007 gallery ==
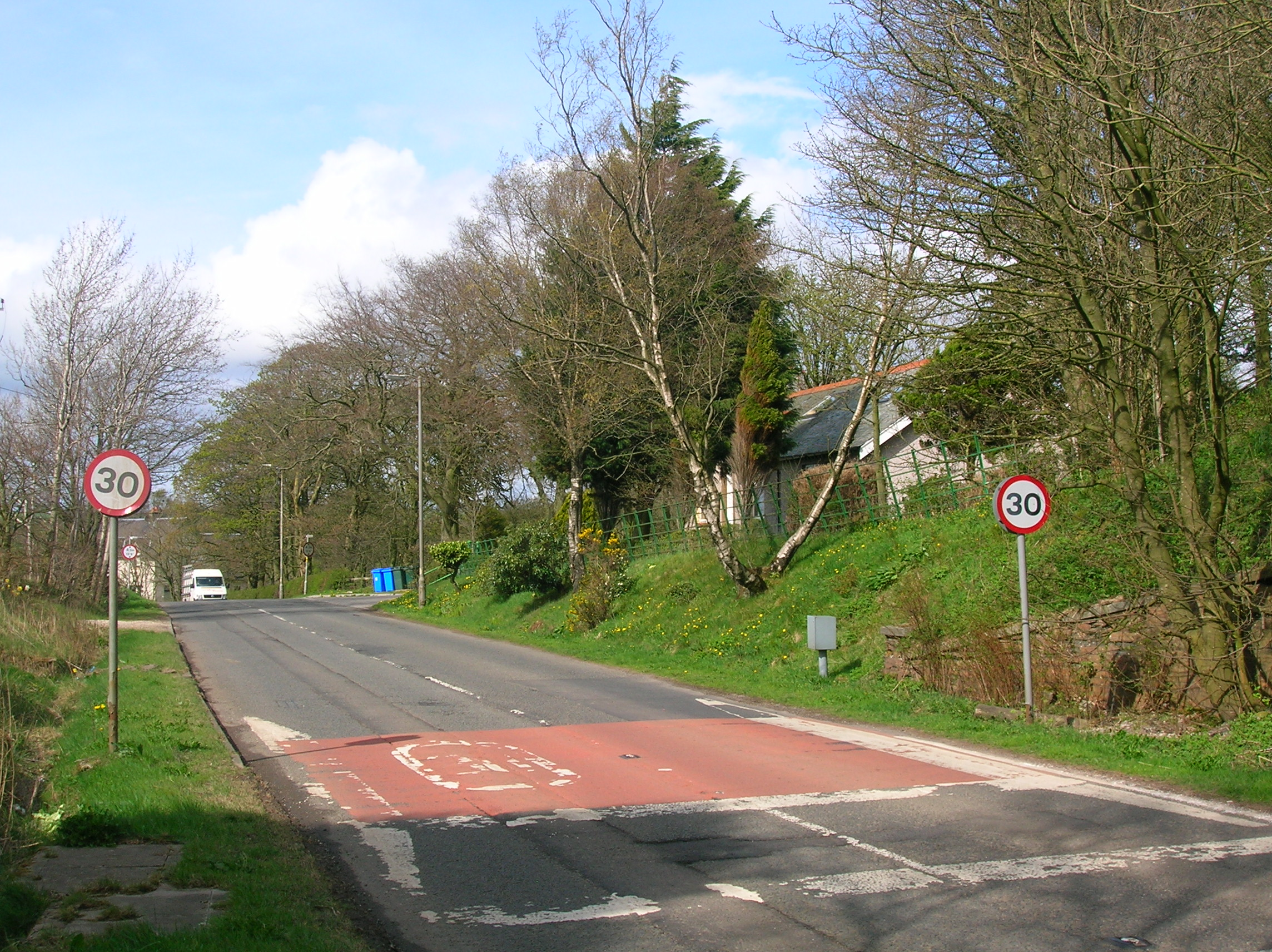
The stationmaster's house

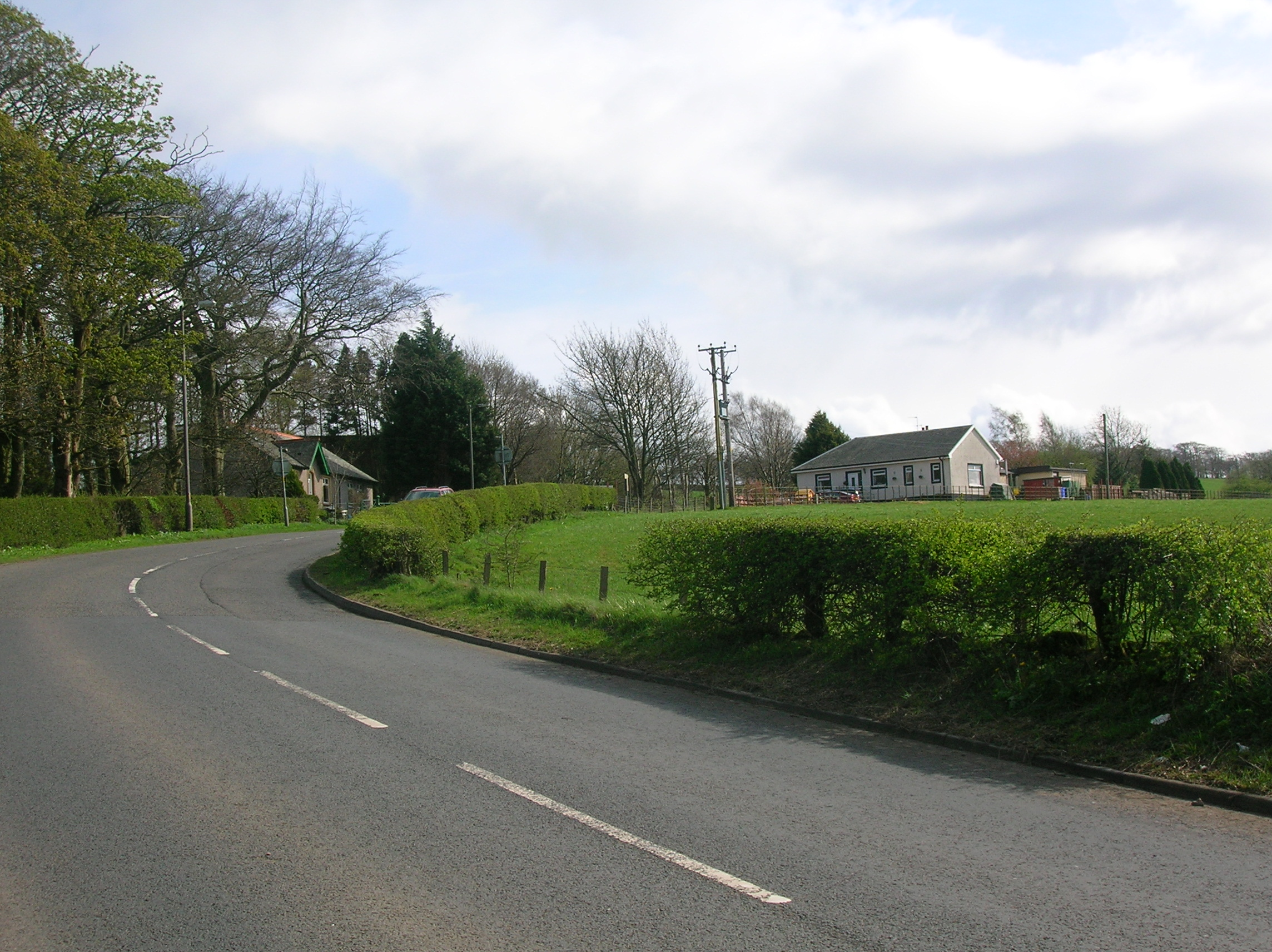
The stationmaster's house on the left and the much altered railway workers' houses on the right

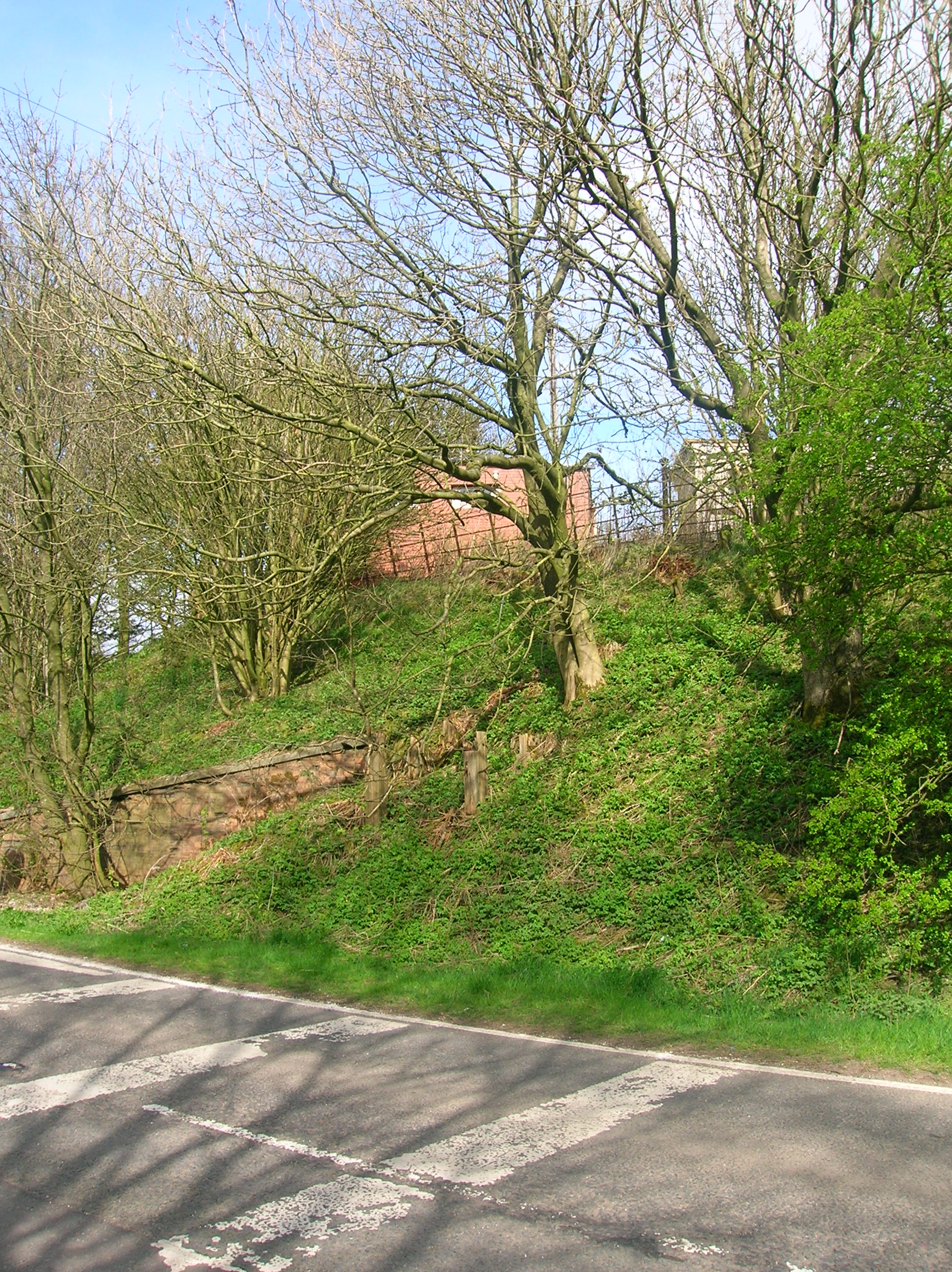
The remains of the wooden pedestrian footbridge and way up to the station
