= Netherton Goods station =

Railway public freight facility in East Renfrewshire, Scotland

Netherton Goods
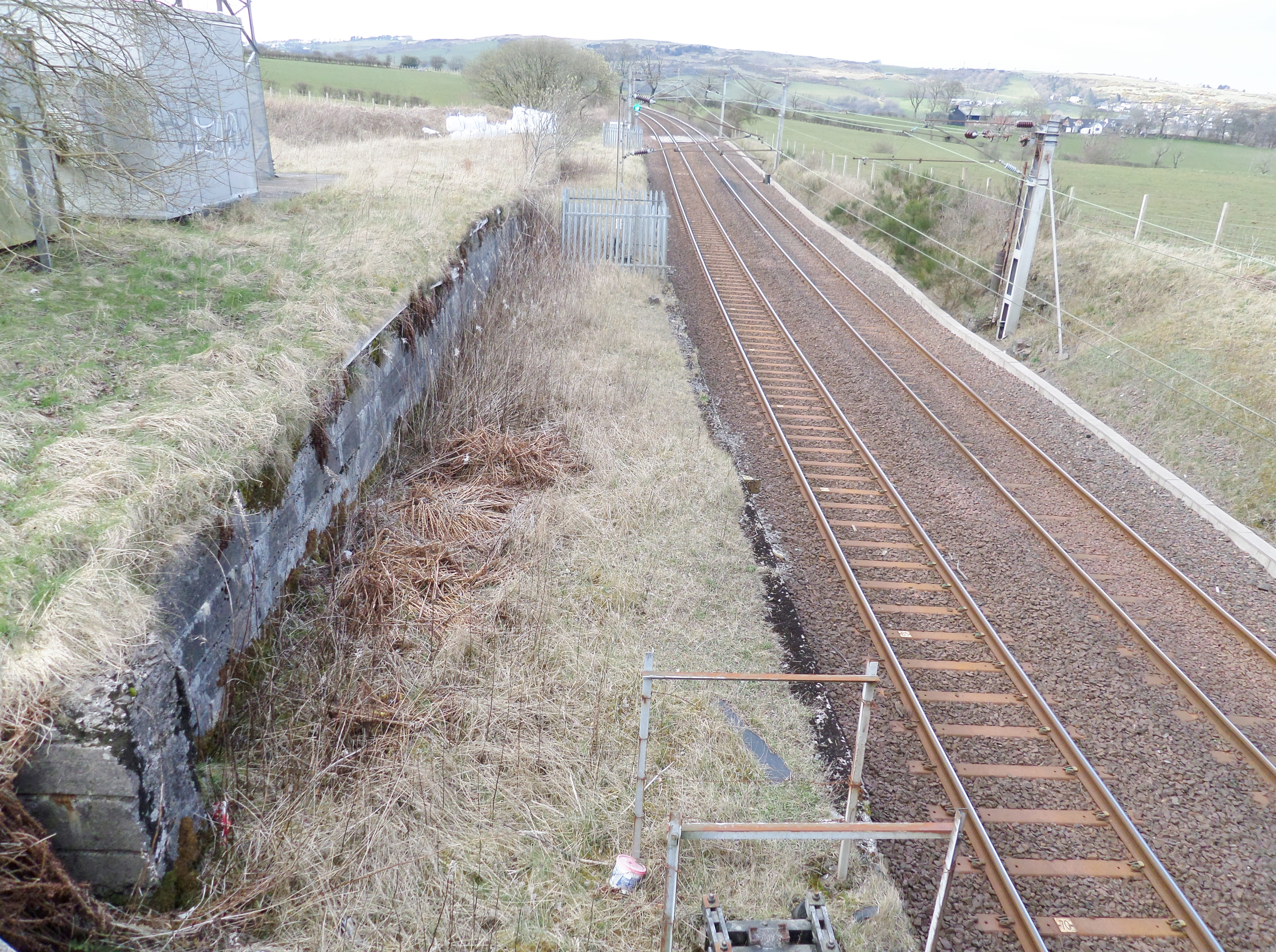
- Site of Netherton Goods station from the road overbridge

General information
- Location: Near Neilston, East Renfrewshire; Scotland
- Coordinates: 55.785492°N 4.396302°W
- Grid reference: NS498572
- Platforms: Goods station

Other information
- Status: Disused

History
- Original company: L&A
- Pre-grouping: CR
- Post-grouping: LMS

Key dates
- 1 May 1903: Opened
- Circa 1958: Goods services withdrawn
Location

Netherton Goods station or Netherton Depot was a railway public freight facility located between Neilston railway station and Patterton railway station just west of the proposed site of Lyoncross railway station, East Renfrewshire, Scotland. Netherton Goods served the industrial and agricultural requirements for transportation in the vicinity, with the town of Arthurlie not far away, sitting on and near country lanes to Neilston, Arthurlie, and Barrhead. Netherton, Glanderston, Balgraystone, and Dyke Farms were located nearby. Netherton Goods was close to Lyoncross Junction between the Lanarkshire and Ayrshire Railway and the Paisley and Barrhead District Railway near Balgray Reservoir.

Although a seemingly remote location today the facility would have had freight transport business in the form of lime for the fields, cattle, horse and sheep movements, milk and cheese delivery, mining and quarrying related items, etc.

== Infrastructure ==
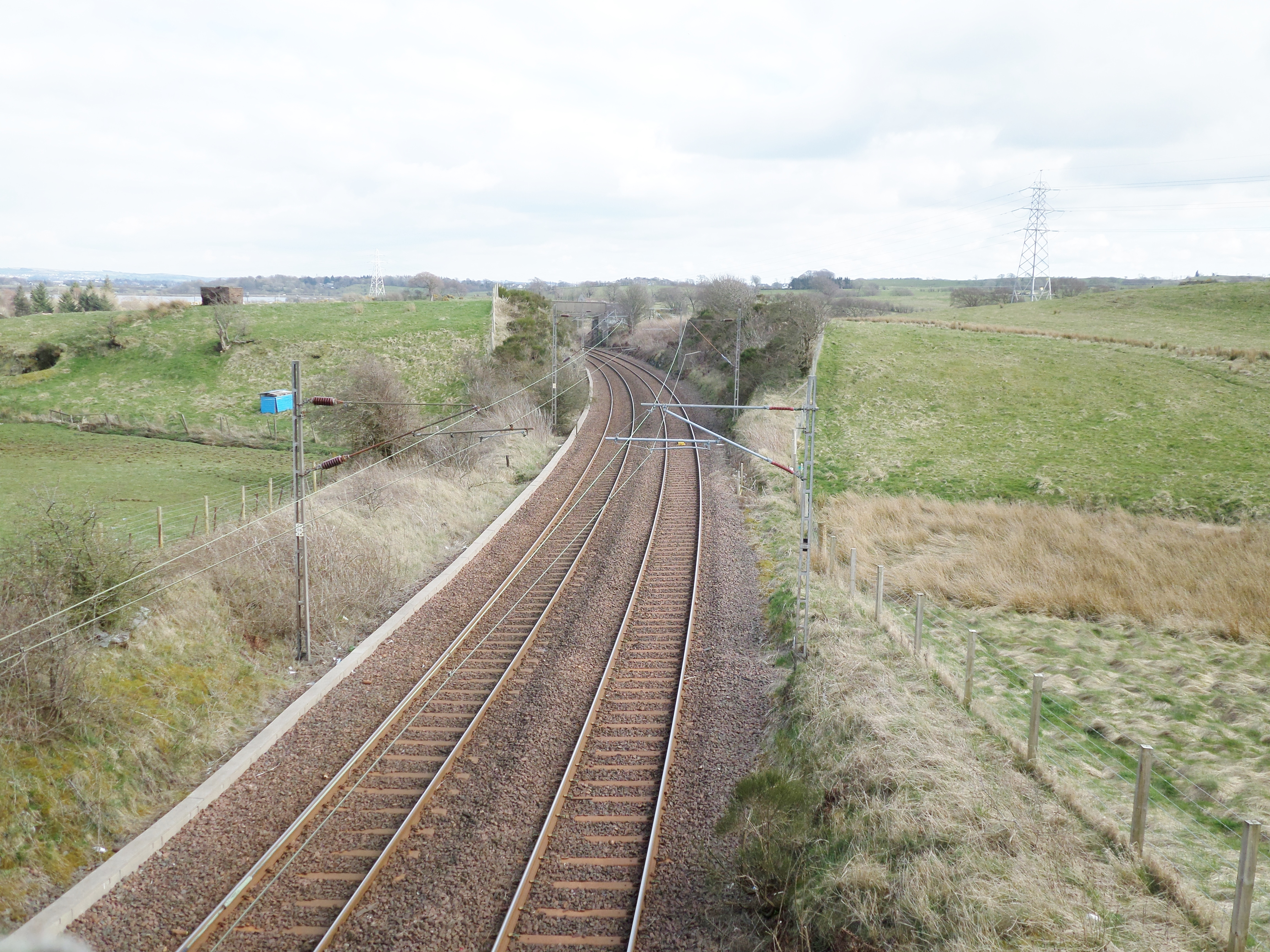
The view towards Lyoncross Junction and Patterton.

The OS maps of 1911 show a fairly basic infrastructure with the double track main line and a single siding running off to branch twice, one siding running to a loading dock, and a single siding running to a shorter second loading and unloading area. The access point was from Springhill Road, just across from the road overbridge. A signal box was not present and only a possible ground frame and a lone signal post at the siding are shown. A weighing machine is shown and the demolition rubble of this brick structure was still visible in 2016. In 1958 the tracks were still in situ.

== History ==
Opened by the Lanarkshire and Ayrshire Railway in 1903, then joining the Caledonian Railway it became part of the London Midland and Scottish Railway during the Grouping of 1923.

Netherton Goods station lay on the line that ran towards Neilston and Uplawmoor and then onwards to eventually reach a terminus at Ardrossan Montgomerie Pier railway station. It was supervised by staff at Neilston railway station.

Other pure goods stations down the line were located at Gree (opened on 1 May 1903 and closed by 1950) and at Lissens close to Kilwinning.

=== Workings details ===
In 1907 the Caledonian Railway Working Timetable (WTT) shows that the 12.10 pm goods from Gushetfaulds to Ardrossan via Cathcart worked nearby Gree siding and it would probably have worked Netherton en route.

== The site today ==
Railway workers' accommodation cottages were never built at the site probably as the facility was too small. Although the sidings have been lifted the site is still in use for access and the storage of materials. The electrified double track line of the Neilston branch still runs past the site. Two telecoms system masts and associated GSM-R equipment are located on the old loading dock and provide railway staff with voice and text communication.

Preceding station	National Rail	Following station
Neilston railway station Line and station open	ScotRail; Cathcart Circle Lines	Patterton
	Historical railways	
Neilston railway station Line and station open	Caledonian Railway; Lanarkshire and Ayrshire Railway	Lyoncross; Line open; station never constructed
