= Mike Calveley =

English footballer (born 1999)

Personal information
- Full name: Michael Thomas Calveley
- Date of birth: 22 June 1999 (age 27)
- Place of birth: Chester, England
- Height: 1.78 m (5 ft 10 in)
- Position: Midfielder

Team information
- Current team: Chorley
- Number: 8

Youth career
- Port Vale

Senior career*
Years	Team	Apps	(Gls)
2017–2019	Port Vale	3	(0)
2017	→ Leek Town (loan)	8	(0)
2018–2019	→ Nuneaton Borough (loan)	38	(4)
2019–2020	Curzon Ashton	21	(3)
2020–	Chorley	230	(32)
- * Club domestic league appearances and goals as of 10:54, 26 April 2026 (UTC)

Michael Thomas Calveley (born 22 June 1999) is an English professional footballer who plays as a midfielder for National League North club Chorley.

He turned professional at Port Vale in May 2017 and went on to play on loan at Leek Town and Nuneaton Borough. Released in May 2019, he signed for Curzon Ashton four months later. He joined Chorley in July 2020.

== Career ==
=== Port Vale ===
Calveley turned professional at Port Vale in May 2017; he signed a one-year contract shortly after receiving the club's Youth Player of the Year award. On 13 September 2017, he joined Northern Premier League Division One South side Leek Town on a one-month loan. Vale manager Michael Brown said that he sanctioned the loan move because of his respect for "Blues" manager Neil Baker. He scored his first senior goal with a 25 yards (23 m) strike in Town's 4–1 FA Trophy victory over Lincoln United at Harrison Park on 7 October. He was recalled by new "Valiants" manager Neil Aspin to make his senior debut in a 4–2 victory over Crewe Alexandra in an EFL Trophy group stage match at Vale Park on 7 November.

On 19 July 2018, he joined National League North side Nuneaton Borough on loan, along with teammate Dior Angus. He made his debut for "Boro" on the opening day of the 2018–19 season, and went in goal for the last ten minutes of the game after goalkeeper Louis Gray was sent off, managing to keep a clean sheet as his new team recorded a 0–0 draw with Ashton United. On 26 December, he scored his first goal for Nuneaton in a 3–1 defeat at AFC Telford United. On 19 January, he scored both of Nuneaton's goals in their 2–2 draw at Hereford. He was recalled from his loan spell by new Vale manager John Askey in April, having scored four goals in 42 matches for Nuneaton. However, he played just two minutes for Vale as a substitute and Askey confirmed that he would not be offering Calveley a new contract on 16 May; meanwhile he was voted as Nuneaton's players' Player of the Year.

=== Curzon Ashton ===
Calveley joined National League North side Curzon Ashton and made his debut for the "Nash" on 28 September 2019, in a 2–1 defeat at Farsley Celtic. He scored three goals in 22 games during the 2019–20 season, which was curtailed early due to the COVID-19 pandemic in England.

=== Chorley ===
Calveley was signed by National League North rivals Chorley on 8 July 2020. Manager Jamie Vermiglio said that "he'll bring strength and energy to the midfield and our supporters will no doubt appreciate his work ethic". The "Magpies" enjoyed a deep run in the FA Cup, making it through three rounds of qualification with wins over Gateshead and York City and a bye. In the first round Proper, they came from two goals down to beat Wigan Athletic 3–2 after extra time, with Calveley providing the assist for Elliot Newby in Chorley's first goal of the comeback. They beat another League One side away from home in the second round, Peterborough United, and Calveley scored the winning goal on 62 minutes. He also scored in the next round as Chorley beat Championship side Derby County 2–0 at Victory Park. The cup run came to an end in the fourth round with a 1–0 home defeat to Premier League side Wolverhampton Wanderers. However, the 2020–21 season was curtailed early in February due to the pandemic.

He agreed on a one-year contract extension in October 2021, keeping him at Chorley until the summer of 2023. He scored three goals across 42 appearances in the 2021–22 campaign, including playing in the play-off quarter-final defeat to York City. He made 46 appearances in the 2022–23 season, where Chorley missed out on the play-offs with defeat on the final day. He played 44 of Chorley's 46 league games of the 2023–24 season, helping the club to the play-offs with a fourth-place finish. They were beaten by Brackley Town at the semi-final stage.

Calveley signed a new long-term contract with Chorley in October 2024 as manager Andy Preece felt he would continue to be a key member of the squad for "the next four or five seasons". He publicly praised the player again for his dependability the following month. Calveley scored 12 goals in 50 games during the 2024–25 campaign, including the play-off semi-final defeat at Scunthorpe United. He signed a new contract with the club in April 2026, saying "it was a no brainer for me and I'm excited for what the future holds for me here". He scored seven goals in 42 league games in the 2025–26 campaign. He was appointed as club captain in August 2026.

== Style of play ==
Port Vale youth team coach Mick Ede stated that Calveley is "a big midfielder, a destroyer, but when he gets on the ball you know he generally looks for that forward pass and breaks lines".

== Career statistics ==
As of end of the 2025–26 season

Appearances and goals by club, season and competition
Club	Season	League			FA Cup		League Cup		Other		Total	
Club	Season	Division	Apps	Goals	Apps	Goals	Apps	Goals	Apps	Goals	Apps	Goals
Port Vale	2017–18	League Two	2	0	0	0	0	0	1 (Note: Appearance in the EFL Trophy)	0	3	0
Port Vale	2018–19	EFL League Two	1	0	0	0	0	0	0	0	1	0
Port Vale	Total		3	0	0	0	0	0	1	0	4	0
Leek Town (loan)	2017–18	NPL - Division One South	8	0	0	0	—		3 (Note: Appearances in the FA Trophy and the Northern Premier League League Challenge Cup)	1	11	1
Nuneaton Borough (loan)	2018–19	National League North	38	4	0	0	—		4 (Note: Appearances in the Birmingham Senior Cup, Worcestershire Senior Cup and FA Trophy)	0	42	4
Curzon Ashton	2019–20	National League North	21	3	0	0	—		1 (Note: Appearance(s) in the FA Trophy)	0	22	3
Chorley	2020–21	National League North	15	1	4	2	—		1	0	20	3
Chorley	2021–22	National League North	40	3	0	0	—		2 (Note: 1 appearance in the FA Trophy and 1 appearance in the play-offs)	0	42	3
Chorley	2022–23	National League North	44	2	0	0	—		2	0	46	2
Chorley	2023–24	National League North	44	7	0	0	—		5 (Note: 4 appearances and 1 goal in the FA Trophy and 1 appearance in the play-offs)	1	49	8
Chorley	2024–25	National League North	45	12	0	0	—		5 (Note: 3 appearances in the FA Trophy and 2 appearances in the play-offs)	0	50	12
Chorley	2025–26	National League North	42	7	0	0	—		0	0	42	7
Chorley	2026–27	National League North	0	0	0	0	—		0	0	0	0
Chorley	Total		230	32	4	2	0	0	15	1	249	35
Career total			300	39	4	2	0	0	24	2	328	43
