= Harry Benns =

English footballer

Personal information
- Full name: Harry Francis Benns
- Date of birth: 13 January 2000 (age 26)
- Place of birth: Warrington, England
- Position: Midfielder

Youth career
- Manchester City
- 2014–2018: Port Vale

Senior career*
| Years | Team | Apps | (Gls) |
| 2018–2019 | Port Vale | 1 | (0) |
| 2018 | → Stafford Rangers (loan) | 14 | (0) |
| 2019 | → Kidsgrove Athletic (loan) | 3 | (0) |
| 2019–2022 | Hyde United | 42 | (1) |
| 2022–2023 | Stalybridge Celtic | 24 | (5) |
| 2023–2024 | Bamber Bridge | 14 | (5) |
| Total | | 98 | (11) |
- * Club domestic league appearances and goals

Harry Francis Benns (born 13 January 2000) is an English former semi-professional footballer who played as a midfielder.

Benns turned professional at Port Vale in May 2018, making his first-team debut that month. He joined Stafford Rangers on loan for the first half of the 2018–19 season and ended the campaign on loan at Kidsgrove Athletic. Released by Port Vale at the end of the 2018–19 season, he then joined Hyde United for three years. He joined Stalybridge Celtic in July 2022 and moved to Bamber Bridge the following season.

== Career ==
=== Port Vale ===
Benns came through the youth team at Port Vale and was given a professional contract in May 2018 after being named as Youth Player of the Year for the 2017–18 season. Manager Neil Aspin gave him his debut on the final day of the 2017–18 season, a 5–0 defeat at Cambridge United on 5 May. However, he entered the game as a 75th-minute substitute for Ben Whitfield when the "Valiants" were already four goals down. This made him the first player born in the 21st century to represent the Port Vale first team.

On 23 August 2018, Benns joined Northern Premier League Premier Division side Stafford Rangers on an initial month-long loan deal – later extended until the end of the 2018–19 season; coach Gary Brabin said that "it is an opportunity for him now to play men's football and get to know what it is about". On 8 September, he scored his first goal in senior football, providing Rangers with the winner in a 2–1 victory at Grimsby Borough in the first round of qualification for the FA Cup. He was named as Stafford Rangers Player of the Month for September. On 20 March 2019, he joined Northern Premier League Division One West club Kidsgrove Athletic on loan until the end of the season. Vale manager John Askey confirmed that he would not be offering Benns a new contract on 16 May.

=== Non-League ===
Benns joined Northern Premier League Premier Division side Hyde United after arriving at Ewen Fields on the first day of the 2019–20 pre-season. He made 16 appearances for the "Tigers", scoring one goal, before picking up a season-ending injury in December. He did not feature in the 2020–21 season, which was curtailed after ten games due to the COVID-19 pandemic in England. He featured 30 times in the 2021–22 campaign and was an unused substitute in the final of the Manchester Premier Cup, where Hyde were beaten by Ashton United. He left the club alongside five others players after rejecting the opportunity to return for pre-season training.

On 5 July 2022, Benns joined Stalybridge Celtic, also of the Northern Premier League Premier Division. He scored six goals from 21 starts and seven substitute appearances in the 2022–23 season as Celtic were relegated in 20th-place. He joined Bamber Bridge in the summer and enjoyed a good start to the 2023–24 season, scoring six goals in 17 games. However, he suffered a double leg fracture with significant ankle damage in a 2–2 draw at Ashton United on 4 November. A GoFundMe was set up to support his recovery as he was left unable to work for a lengthy period of time.

== Style of play ==
Speaking in May 2018, Port Vale youth team coach Mike Ede described Benns as a creative midfielder who "is clever, has the ability to score goals and will take shots from places where you don't think" and who "can play off to the side or as a number 10".

== Career statistics ==
Appearances and goals by club, season and competition
| Club | Season | League | | | FA Cup | | League Cup | | Other | | Total | |
| Club | Season | Division | Apps | Goals | Apps | Goals | Apps | Goals | Apps | Goals | Apps | Goals |
|---|---|---|---|---|---|---|---|---|---|---|---|---|
| Port Vale | 2017–18 | EFL League Two | 1 | 0 | 0 | 0 | 0 | 0 | 0 | 0 | 1 | 0 |
| Port Vale | 2018–19 | EFL League Two | 0 | 0 | 0 | 0 | 0 | 0 | 0 | 0 | 0 | 0 |
| Port Vale | Total | | 1 | 0 | 0 | 0 | 0 | 0 | 0 | 0 | 1 | 0 |
| Stafford Rangers (loan) | 2018–19 | Northern Premier League Premier Division | 14 | 0 | 2 | 1 | 0 | 0 | 6 (Note: 2 Appearances in the Northern Premier League Challenge Cup, 2 appearances in FA Trophy, 1 appearance in Walsall Senior Cup and 1 appearance in Staffordshire Senior Cup.) | 0 | 22 | 1 |
| Kidsgrove Athletic (loan) | 2018–19 | Northern Premier League Division One West | 3 | 0 | 0 | 0 | 0 | 0 | 0 | 0 | 3 | 0 |
| Hyde United | 2019–20 | Northern Premier League Premier Division | 16 | 0 | 1 | 0 | 1 | 0 | 4 (Note: 2 appearances in the Manchester Senior Cup, 1 appearance and 1 goal in the Cheshire Senior Cup and 1 appearance in the FA Trophy) | 1 | 22 | 1 |
| Hyde United | 2020–21 | Northern Premier League Premier Division | 0 | 0 | 0 | 0 | 0 | 0 | 0 | 0 | 0 | 0 |
| Hyde United | 2021–22 | Northern Premier League Premier Division | 26 | 1 | 1 | 0 | 0 | 0 | 3 (Note: 2 appearances in the Manchester Senior Cup, 1 appearance and 1 goal in Cheshire Senior Cup) | 1 | 30 | 2 |
| Hyde United | Total | | 42 | 1 | 2 | 0 | 1 | 0 | 7 | 2 | 52 | 3 |
| Stalybridge Celtic | 2022–23 | Northern Premier League Premier Division | 24 | 5 | 1 | 0 | 0 | 0 | 3 (Note: 1 appearance in the FA Trophy, 1 appearance and 1 goal in the Cheshire Senior Cup and 1 appearance in the Manchester Senior Cup) | 1 | 28 | 6 |
| Bamber Bridge | 2023–24 | Northern Premier League Premier Division | 14 | 5 | 1 | 0 | 0 | 0 | 2 (Note: Appearance/s in the FA Trophy) | 1 | 17 | 6 |
| Career total | | | 98 | 11 | 6 | 1 | 1 | 0 | 18 | 4 | 123 | 16 |

== Honours ==
Hyde United

- Manchester Premier Cup runner-up: 2022
