= Dior Angus =

English footballer (born 1994)

Personal information
- Full name: Dior Thomas Angus
- Date of birth: 18 January 1994 (age 32)
- Place of birth: Coventry, England
- Height: 6 ft 0 in (1.83 m)
- Position: Forward

Youth career
- Solihull Moors

Senior career*
Years	Team	Apps	(Gls)
2011–2013	Solihull Moors	31	(7)
2011	→ Leamington (loan)	0	(0)
2012	→ Banbury United (loan)	13	(1)
2013–2014	Kidderminster Harriers	6	(0)
2013	→ Worcester City (loan)	2	(0)
2014	Solihull Moors	12	(1)
2014–2015	Daventry Town	7	(0)
2015–2016	Stratford Town	40	(5)
2016–2018	Redditch United	44	(17)
2018–2019	Port Vale	3	(1)
2018	→ Tamworth (loan)	6	(3)
2018	→ Nuneaton Borough (loan)	21	(9)
2019	→ Barrow (loan)	11	(2)
2019–2021	Barrow	58	(14)
2021–2022	Wrexham	42	(7)
2022–2023	Harrogate Town	9	(0)
2023–2024	Altrincham	35	(4)
2024	AFC Telford United	8	(3)
2024–2025	Southport	33	(5)
2025	Bootle	13	(1)
Total		394	(80)
- * Club domestic league appearances and goals

Dior Thomas Angus (born 18 January 1994) is an English former professional footballer who played as a forward. He scored 100 goals in 450 league and cup appearances across a 14-year career.

Angus began his career in non-League football, playing for Solihull Moors, Leamington (on loan), Banbury United (on loan), Kidderminster Harriers, Worcester City (on loan), Daventry Town, Stratford Town and Redditch United. He earned a move to Port Vale in January 2018 after he scored 17 goals for Redditch in the first half of the 2017–18 season. From Vale, he was loaned out to Tamworth, Nuneaton Borough and Barrow before he joined Barrow on a permanent contract in May 2019. He helped Barrow to win promotion into the Football League as champions of the National League in the 2019–20 season, before moving on to Wrexham in January 2021. He was sold to Harrogate Town in September 2022 and joined Altrincham in June 2023. He spent one season with Altrincham before moving on to AFC Telford United and then Southport in 2024. He joined Bootle in July 2025 and retired four months later.

== Career ==
=== Non-league ===
Angus began his career at Solihull Moors under the management of Marcus Bignot. He joined Southern League Premier Division side Leamington on loan during 2011–12 pre-season, and scored twice on his first-team debut in a 4–1 victory over Highgate United in the opening round of the Birmingham Senior Cup on 27 September. However, he featured just twice more. He failed to break into the starting eleven. He went on to join Southern League Premier Division rivals Banbury United on loan, scoring four goals from 21 appearances. He made his debut for Solihull on 13 October 2012, in 2–0 win over Guiseley at Damson Park. He scored his first goal for the Moors on 20 November, in a 2–2 draw at Boston United. He went on to score seven goals from 33 appearances throughout the 2012–13 campaign.

On 17 June 2013, Angus signed a one-year contract with Conference Premier club Kidderminster Harriers. He was loaned out to Worcester City of the Conference North, but was sent back to Aggborough on 25 November after refusing to play for Worcester in the FA Trophy. He made six appearances for the "Carpetmen" before being released in January 2014. He returned to Solihull Moors, and scored one goal in 12 games in the second half of the 2013–14 season.

On 26 June 2014, Angus joined Southern League Division One Central club Daventry Town. He made ten appearances in the 2014–15 season, scoring two goals. He then moved up a division to join Stratford Town. He scored five goals from 41 appearances in the 2015–16 season. On 2 December 2016, Angus joined Redditch United, becoming manager Darren Byfield's third acquisition from Stratford Town that season. He ended the 2016–17 campaign with two goals from 23 games for the "Reds" and one goal from nine games for Stratford. He scored 17 goals from 23 appearances in the first half of the 2017–18 season.

=== Port Vale ===
On 1 January 2018, Angus signed an 18-month contract with EFL League Two side Port Vale. Despite Angus not being under contract at Redditch, Port Vale offered the club a pre-season friendly and some loan signings in compensation. Manager Neil Aspin said there was no pressure Angus to make an instant impact at Vale Park. He made his first-team debut on 6 January, coming on as a 75th-minute substitute for Marcus Harness in a 1–0 defeat at Forest Green Rovers. On 22 March, he joined National League North side Tamworth on loan until the end of the 2017–18 season. He scored three goals in six games for the "Lambs", though his loan spell at The Lamb Ground was cut short after Tamworth's relegation was confirmed. He returned to Port Vale and scored his first goal from his first start in the English Football League on 28 April, in a 2–1 home defeat to Carlisle United. After the game Aspin said that "I really hope that he can produce it at this level [League Two], but there is no pressure on him".

On 19 July 2018, he joined National League North side Nuneaton Borough on loan, along with "Valiants" teammate Mike Calveley. He returned to Port Vale on 3 January after having scored 13 goals for 25 appearances in the first half of the 2018–19 season despite "Boro" being rooted to the bottom of the league table. He said his time at Liberty Way meant a lot to him as his father was a former player at the club, though the club's financial crisis meant his own spell there was "interesting but enjoyable"; he noted that "I have never played in a team where we have had three different home kits from the start of the season to this point".

=== Barrow ===
On 15 January 2019, Angus joined National League side Barrow on loan until the end of the 2018–19 season. He picked up an ankle injury in March. He was subsequently warned by manager Ian Evatt not to rush his recovery, hoping to return to fitness early and proving himself worthy of a contract in the few remaining games of the season. Vale manager John Askey confirmed that he would not be offering Angus a new contract on 16 May. Four days later, Angus signed a one-year contract at Barrow, with the option for a further 12 months.

He signed a new contract in January 2020 to keep him at the club until summer 2021, with the option of an extra year. Despite undergoing a 14-game drought spell at the start of the 2019–20 season, he went on to form an effective strike partnership with Scott Quigley and the "Bluebirds" were top of the National League when the league was suspended due to the coronavirus pandemic in March 2020. Though the season was not resumed, Barrow went on to be promoted to the Football League as National League champions.

On 12 September 2020, Angus scored for Barrow in a 1–1 draw with Stevenage at Holker Street. This was the club's first EFL goal in over 48 years.

=== Wrexham ===
On 1 February 2021, Angus signed for National League side Wrexham on an 18-month contract after leaving Barrow. Injuries to Kwame Thomas and Jordan Ponticelli left Angus as the only fit striker available to manager Dean Keates in early April. Having scored six goals by the start of May, Angus said that the "Red Dragons" play-off campaign was "ours to lose". However, Wrexham missed out on the play-offs after drawing with Dagenham & Redbridge on the final day of the 2020–21 season. The club took up an option to extend his contract by an additional 12 months in January 2022, with manager Phil Parkinson stating that "he's had a frustrating time through injury and illness, but with his contract now sorted early in the transfer window, we are now focused completely on getting Dior back up to speed". He featured 21 times in the 2021–22 season, though was not in the matchday squad for the play-off semi-final defeat to Grimsby Town at the Racecourse Ground or the 2022 FA Trophy final defeat to Bromley at Wembley Stadium. He was also not named in a matchday squad in the first six games of the 2022–23 campaign.

=== Harrogate Town ===
On 1 September 2022, Angus returned to the Football League to join Harrogate Town for an undisclosed fee. He had to wait until 7 January to make his home debut at Wetherby Road, following a frustrating four-month spell with ankle ligament injuries and illnesses. He made nine appearances in the 2022–23 campaign, including only one league start.

=== Return to non-League ===
He joined National League club Altrincham in June 2023, where manager Phil Parkinson looked to add competition for striker Regan Linney. He scored four goals, providing five assists in 38 appearances before being released at the end of the 2023–24 campaign following Altrincham's defeat to Bromley in the play-off semi-finals.

On 19 June 2024, he dropped down two divisions to sign with Southern League Premier Division Central side AFC Telford United after Kevin Wilkin admitted he had previously made several unsuccessful attempts to sign him.

On 12 October 2024, Angus joined National League North side Southport. He scored five goals in 33 league games in the 2024–25 season.

On 25 July 2025, he joined Northern Premier League Division One West club Bootle. On 19 November 2025, Angus announced his retirement.

== Style of play ==
Angus was a forward who described his style of play as being about "goals, pace [and] work rate".

== Personal life ==
Angus worked as an electrician and a model before turning professional in 2018. He is the son of Terry Angus, a defender who played for Northampton Town and Fulham.

== Career statistics ==
Appearances and goals by club, season and competition
Club	Season	League			FA Cup		Other		Total	
Club	Season	Division	Apps	Goals	Apps	Goals	Apps	Goals	Apps	Goals
Solihull Moors	2012–13	Conference North	31	7	0	0	2 (Note: Appearance(s) in the FA Trophy.)	0	33	7
Leamington (loan)	2011–12	Southern League; Premier Division	0	0	1	0	2 (Note: Appearance(s) in the Birmingham Senior Cup.)	2	3	2
Banbury United (loan)	2011–12	Southern League; Premier Division	13	1	0	0	8 (Note: 1 appearance in the Oxfordshire Senior Cup, 4 appearances and 1 goal in the Southern League Cup, 3 appearances and 2 goals in the Buckingham Senior Charity Cup.)	3	21	4
Kidderminster Harriers	2013–14	Conference Premier	6	0	0	0	0	0	6	0
Worcester City (loan)	2013–14	Conference North	2	0	0	0	0	0	2	0
Solihull Moors	2013–14	Conference North	12	1	0	0	0	0	12	1
Daventry Town	2014–15	Southern League; Division One Central	7	0	1	0	2 (Note: 1 appearance and 1 goal in the Northamptonshire Senior Cup, 1 appearance and 1 goal in the Southern League Cup.)	2	10	2
Stratford Town	2015–16	Southern League; Premier Division	34	5	1	0	6 (Note: 3 appearances in the Birmingham Senior Cup, 3 appearances in the FA Trophy)	0	41	5
Stratford Town	2016–17	Southern League; Premier Division	6	0	0	0	3 (Note: 1 appearance in the Southern League Cup, 2 appearances in the FA Trophy)	1	9	1
Stratford Town	Total		40	5	1	0	9	1	50	6
Redditch United	2016–17	Southern League; Premier Division	23	2	0	0	0	0	23	2
Redditch United	2017–18	Southern League; Premier Division	21	15	2	0	2 (Note: 1 appearance in the Southern League Cup and 1 appearance in the FA Trophy.)	2	25	17
Redditch United	Total		44	17	2	0	2	2	48	19
Port Vale	2017–18	EFL League Two	3	1	—		—		3	1
Port Vale	2018–19	EFL League Two	0	0	0	0	1 (Note: Appearance(s) in the EFL Trophy.)	0	1	0
Port Vale	Total		3	1	0	0	1	0	4	1
Tamworth (loan)	2017–18	National League North	6	3	0	0	0	0	6	3
Nuneaton Borough (loan)	2018–19	National League North	21	9	0	0	4 (Note: Appearances in the Birmingham Senior Cup, Worcestershire Senior Cup and FA Trophy.)	4	25	13
Barrow (loan)	2018–19	National League	11	2	0	0	0	0	11	2
Barrow	2019–20	National League	36	10	1	0	3	2	40	12
Barrow	2020–21	EFL League Two	22	4	1	0	2 (Note: 1 appearance in the EFL Trophy and 1 appearance in the EFL Cup.)	1	25	5
Barrow	Total		69	16	2	0	5	3	76	19
Wrexham	2020–21	National League	25	6	0	0	0	0	25	6
Wrexham	2021–22	National League	17	1	3	0	2	0	22	1
Wrexham	2022–23	National League	0	0	0	0	0	0	0	0
Wrexham	Total		42	7	3	0	2	0	47	7
Harrogate Town	2022–23	EFL League Two	9	0	0	0	0	0	9	0
Altrincham	2023–24	National League	35	4	1	0	2	0	38	4
AFC Telford United	2024–25	Southern League; Premier Division Central	8	3	1	0	1	1	10	4
Southport	2024–25	National League North	33	5	0	0	0	0	33	5
Bootle	2025–26	Northern Premier League; Division One West	13	1	4	2	0	0	17	3
Career total			394	80	16	2	40	18	450	100

== Honours ==
Barrow

- National League: 2019–20
