= 2018–19 Port Vale F.C. season =

Port Vale F.C.
2018–19 season
- Chairman: Norman Smurthwaite
- Manager: Neil Aspin (until 30 January); Danny Pugh (caretaker 30 January – 4 February); John Askey (from 4 February)
- Stadium: Vale Park
- EFL League Two: 20th (49 points)
- FA Cup: First round (eliminated by Sunderland)
- EFL Cup: First round (eliminated by Lincoln City)
- EFL Trophy: Quarter-finals (eliminated by Bristol Rovers)
- Player of the Year: Scott Brown
- Top goalscorer: League: Tom Pope (11); All: Tom Pope (14)
- Highest home attendance: 7,940 vs. Stoke City U21, 4 December 2018
- Lowest home attendance: 554 vs. Middlesbrough U21, 16 October 2018
- Average home league attendance: 4,431
- Biggest win: 4–0 vs. Stoke City U21, 4 December 2018
- Biggest defeat: 0–4 and 2–6
Home colours	Away colours

The 2018–19 season was Port Vale's 107th season of football in the English Football League, and second consecutive season in EFL League Two.

Neil Aspin marked his first summer transfer window as the club's manager with ten new permanent signings and five loan players to build his own squad, all of which were free signings except for striker Ricky Miller. The season started with five defeats in the opening seven games before a 1–1 draw at Forest Green Rovers on 8 September marked a turnaround in results and performances. The team suffered 4–0 and 6–2 defeats at home to Lincoln City in the first round of the EFL Cup and in the league, though managed to win 1–0 at local rivals Crewe Alexandra to maintain a lower mid-table position from the end of August to the end of October. In the EFL Trophy, the two home group games set record low attendances at Vale Park and Nelson Agho became the youngest player in the club's history aged 15 years, 262 days. They won all three group games to advance to the knockout stages, where they were drawn against Stoke City U21 – the academy team of Potteries derby rivals Stoke City; Vale won the match 4–0 in front of a season-high crowd of 7,940, but hooligans amongst the Stoke supporters caused around £100,000 of damage to Vale Park and surrounding areas of Burslem.

Vale suffered a miserable December following their win over Stoke, drawing three and losing two of their five league games against teams around them in the bottom half of the table. They did manage to pick up a 1–1 draw at league leaders Lincoln City on New Year's Day, though after the game, Aspin considered leaving the club after feeling that supporters had shown him a "lack of respect". He chose to stay and oversaw a run to the EFL Trophy quarter-finals, where Vale ended up being knocked out by Bristol Rovers. However, he resigned on 30 January following a run of one win in ten league games. He was succeeded by John Askey, who turned the team's form around after losing his first four games in charge. As relegation seemed increasingly unlikely, attention then turned to ownership issues, as fans protested against chairman Norman Smurthwaite. Rejecting offers to buy the club, Smurthwaite claimed that he would put the club into administration on 5 May if he were still the club's owner. Carol and Kevin Shanahan completed their takeover on 7 May.

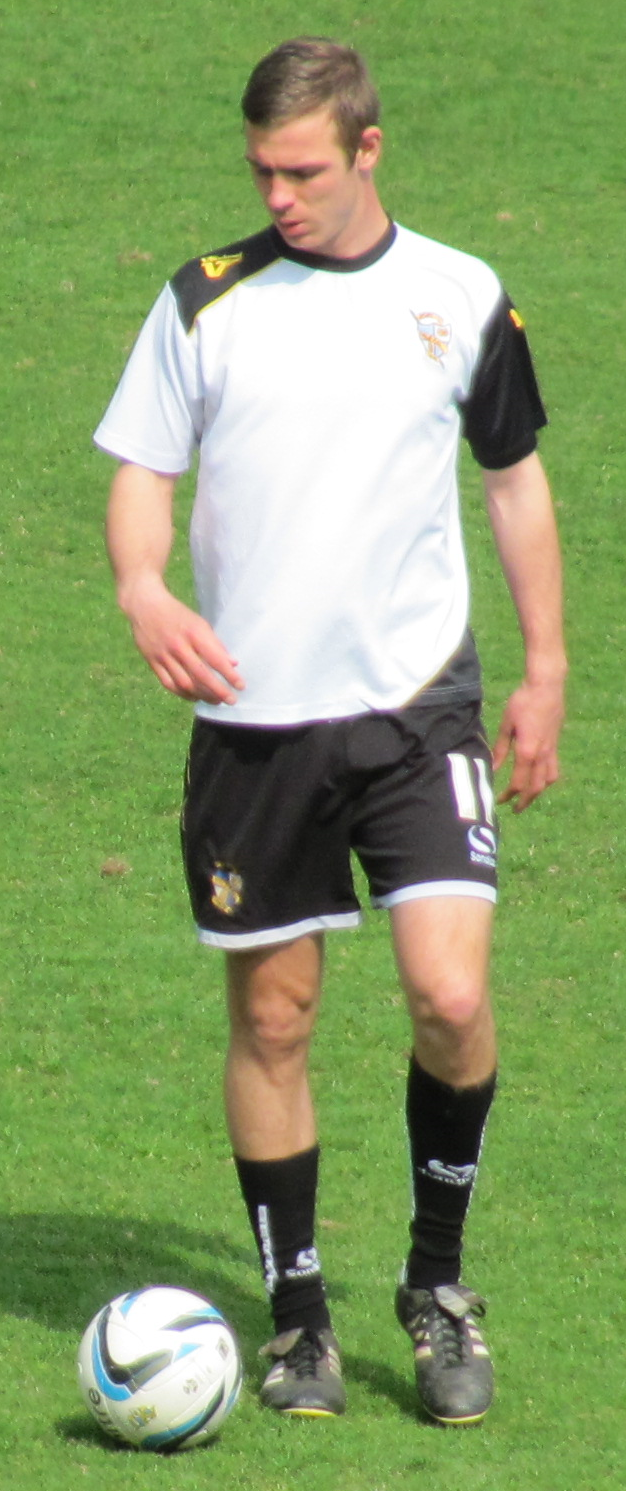
Tom Pope finished as top-scorer with 14 goals.

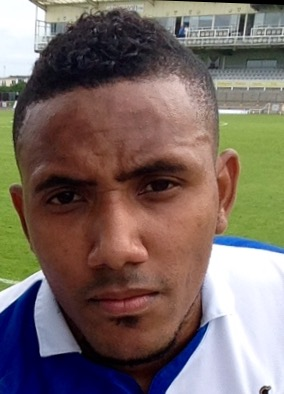
Cristian Montaño contributed seven goals.

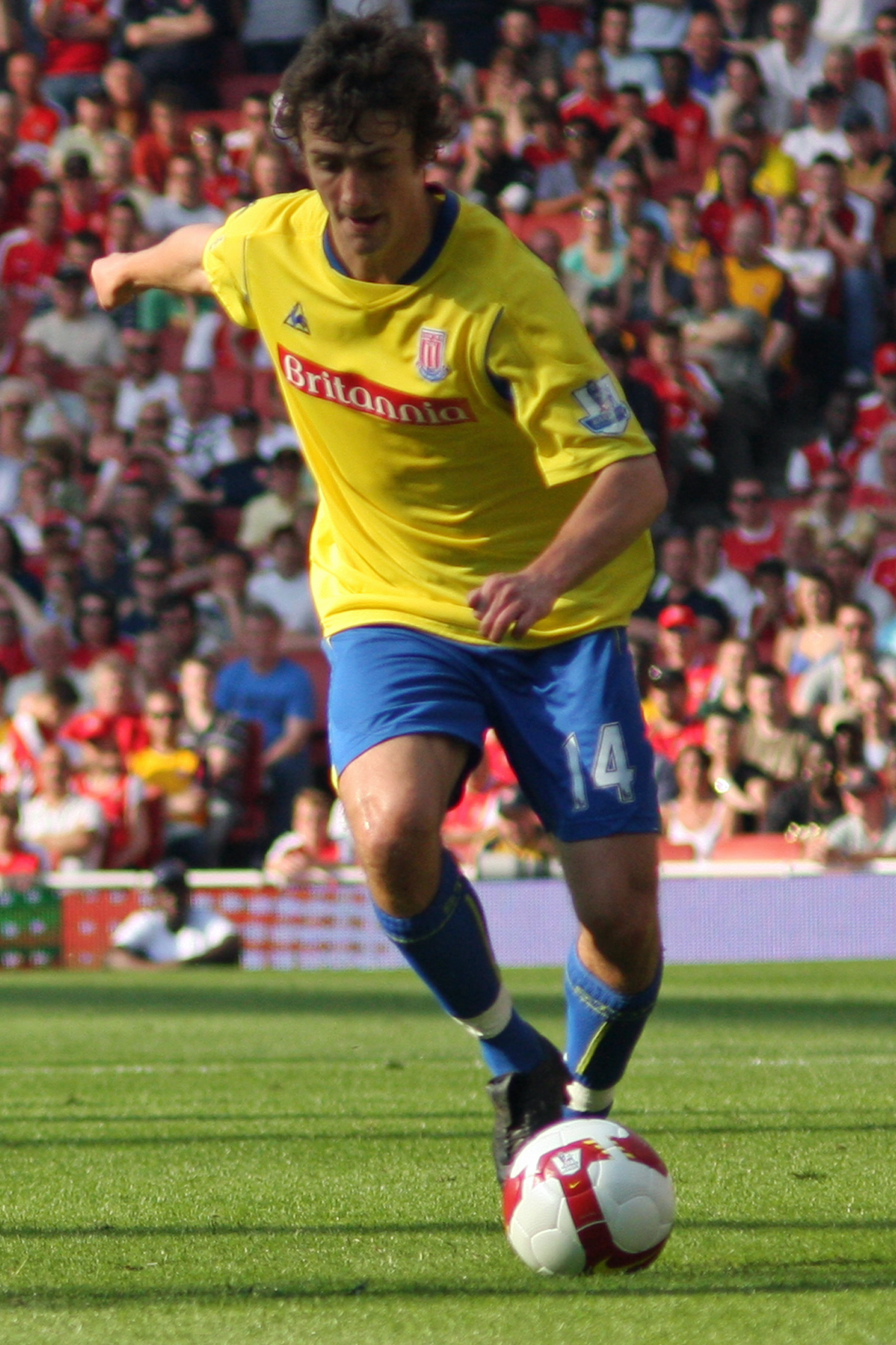
Danny Pugh had his final season as a player.

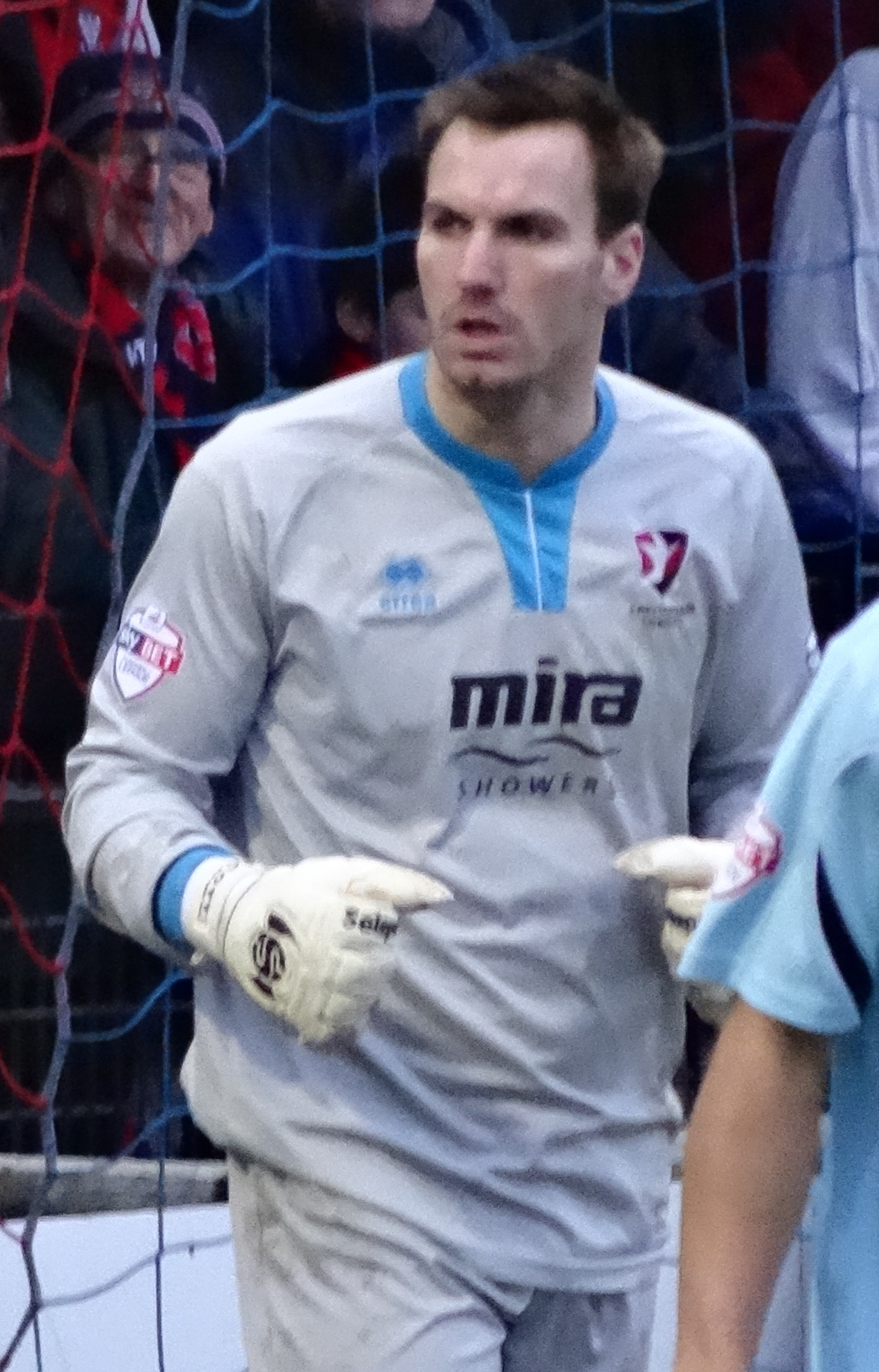
Goalkeeper Scott Brown won the club's Player of the Year award.

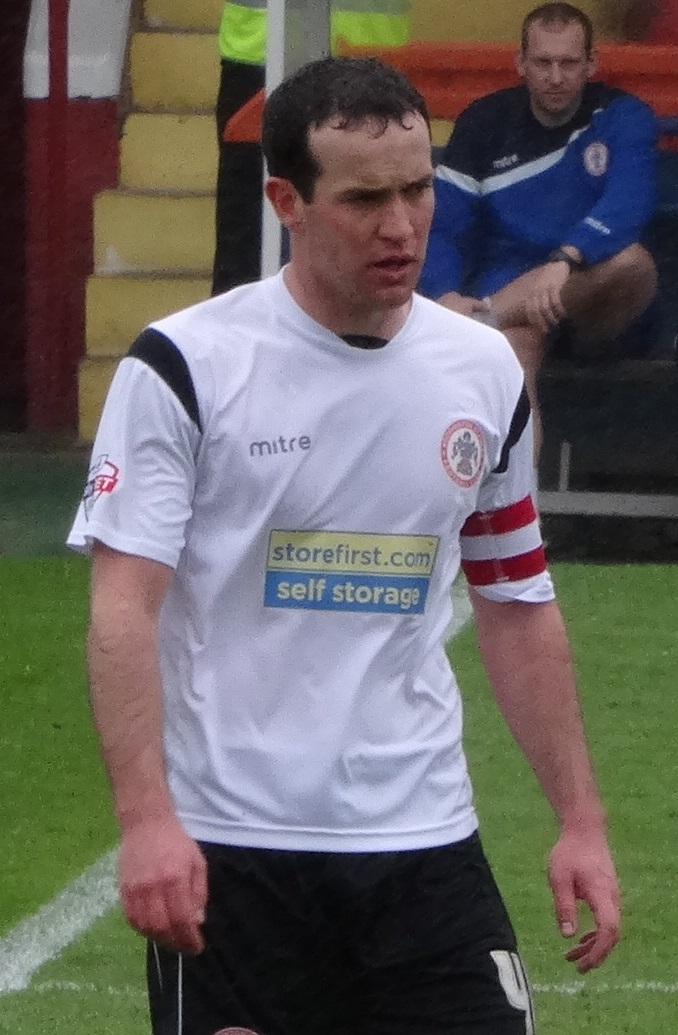
Luke Joyce made 42 appearances.

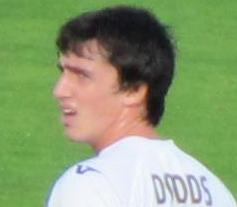
Louis Dodds had an unsuccessful loan spell.

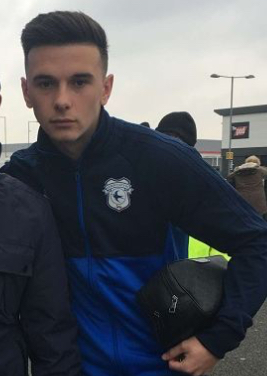
Mark Harris featured six times.

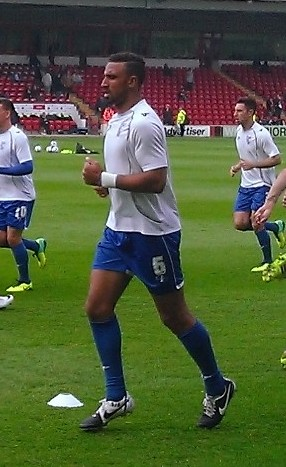
Leon Legge played 37 games.

== Overview ==
=== EFL League Two ===
Neil Aspin's first signing of the window was 33-year-old goalkeeper Scott Brown, who had been an ever-present for Wycombe Wanderers when they won promotion out of EFL League Two the previous season. Aspin stated that Brown's experience would help with organising the Vale's young defenders on the pitch. He quickly followed this by bringing in 30-year-old Carlisle United midfielder Luke Joyce on a two-year contract and 24-year-old Alfreton Town winger Brendon Daniels on a six-month contract, describing Joyce as "vastly experienced" and Daniels as "a local lad who is desperate to prove himself". Next to arrive were centre-backs Leon Legge and Connell Rawlinson, arriving on free transfers after leaving Cambridge United and The New Saints respectively. Aspin said that he hoped the experience of Legge would aid the development of young centre-half Nathan Smith. His sixth signing was central midfielder Manny Oyeleke, who had just left National League side Aldershot Town after picking up their Player of the Year award. After a wait of some weeks, the seventh incoming player was revealed to be attacker Louis Dodds, who joined on a season-long loan from relegated Chesterfield; he had previously played for the Vale from 2008 to 2016. Aspin said that Dodds had been keen on a return to Vale Park and "he has cost us next to nothing really". Vale then acquired the services of Peterborough United striker Ricky Miller after paying an undisclosed fee; 29-year-old Miller had scored a remarkable goal tally in the National League but had thus far failed to establish himself in the Football League in a career hindered by legal troubles. Another Peterborough forward then arrived, this time 18-year-old Idris Kanu on a season-long loan, whilst defender Theo Vassell was also signed on a one-year deal from Aspin's former club Gateshead. Going the other way, 20-year-old forward Dan Turner joined Scottish Championship club Falkirk on a six-month loan deal – which was terminated early on 5 October. Taking his place at Vale Park was Scott Quigley, signed on a season-long loan from Blackpool. Aspin also went on to sign former Stevenage midfielder Tom Conlon, who had impressed whilst on trial.

Vale kicked off the season at home to Cambridge United on 4 August and made a flawless start with both Tom Pope and Ricky Miller getting off the mark in a 3–0 victory. However, the following performance was poor, as they fell to a 2–0 defeat at Colchester United. Aspin made his fourth loan signing of the summer later that week, bringing in 19-year-old Aston Villa full-back Mitch Clark as cover for James Gibbons and Cristian Montaño. Clark went straight into the starting eleven at home to Crawley Town on 18 August, and helped the new look defence to a clean sheet and 1–0 win despite the away side dominating the play for much of the second half. However, three days later Vale were beaten 2–1 at Carlisle United, with Aspin blaming the referee for making a "poor decision" to give a first-half penalty against Rawlinson. Vale then went on to lose 1–0 at newly promoted Tranmere Rovers, after which Aspin again bemoaned the officials, stating that his team should have been given a penalty. Aspin went on to say "We had an apology from the Lincoln game to say it wasn't a penalty, we’ve had an apology to say we should have had a penalty in the Carlisle game and an apology to say we should have had a penalty in the Tranmere game." Having managed to offload unwanted striker Tyrone Barnett on loan to Cheltenham Town, Aspin then signed 20-year-old box-to-box midfielder Lewis Hardcastle on a season-long loan from Blackburn Rovers and also brought in Ben Whitfield; Aspin had attempted to sign Whitfield in January before falling out with the player's agent.

Vale opened September at home to Newport County, and though Pope scored to make himself the all-time top-scorer at the Vale Park stadium with 56 goals, Vale still went on to lose the game 2–1 after again being denied a penalty. Away at Forest Green Rovers, Vale turned around a one-goal half-time deficit to draw 1–1 after Pope converted a penalty won by Miller; Rovers ended the match with ten men after Farrend Rawson was shown a straight red card. They then went on to beat Northampton Town 2–0, with Whitfield and Oyeleke the scorers; Oyeleke was named in the EFL team of the week and his goal was listed as the League Two goal of the weekend. Over 1,900 Vale fans went on to travel nearby rivals Crewe Alexandra and witnessed a 1–0 victory thanks to a 75th-minute Legge header, ending a run of ten months without an away victory. Second-place Exeter City then came to Burslem and took a 1–0 lead that they defended until the seventh minute of injury-time, at which point Kanu scored a dramatic late equaliser, his first goal in professional football.

Vale opened October with a difficult home tie with Milton Keynes Dons, and lost 2–0 after playing with ten men after 65 minutes when half-time substituted Montaño went off injured; Aspin defended his decision to put Montaño on as his final substitution by saying "If he wasn't 100 per cent fit, he wouldn't have been on the bench... How stupid do you think I am?" Vale then went on to lose 2–0 at second-from-bottom Grimsby Town, having gone one goal behind within the opening minute following a mistake from Clarke; after the game Aspin attempted to confront some hecklers who had abused him. League leaders Lincoln City then returned to Vale Park on 13 October, and as they did in the EFL Cup won comfortably, leading the game after three minutes and going 3–0 up by half-time before winning the match 6–2; Aspin said it was like "torture" to watch the game but that "I would only leave if I was sacked and that is not the case". Four of Lincoln's goals came from set pieces. They recovered from this performance and picked up a hard-fought 1–0 victory at Oldham Athletic seven days later, which led Aspin to say that the team was united and that he had never "lost the dressing room". Aspin named the same team away at Stevenage, which ended in a 0–0 draw. Vale then closed out the month with a 1–0 win at home to Bury, Pope scoring against the run of play early in the second half after the team held on to a clean sheet following a difficult opening half.

Despite investing heavily in the summer, Notts County came to Vale Park on 3 November just one place above the relegation zone. Both sides had to be satisfied with a 2–2 draw after a late diving header from Pope rescued a point just two minutes after Elliott Ward had put County ahead on 87 minutes; in the first half Kane Hemmings had cancelled out Luke Hannant's early header. Both Aspin and County manager Harry Kewell claimed their sides deserved to win the game. Two weeks later, Vale travelled to Mansfield Town and fell to a 1–0 defeat, with Oyeleke sent off on his return from injury after receiving two yellow cards. Vale then slipped to a 1–0 defeat at home to Swindon Town in front of just 3,877 spectators for a Saturday fixture, and failed to create any meaningful chances throughout the game. However, they saw out the month with a comfortable 3–0 victory at Yeovil Town; two of the goals came from Montaño, who had been highly criticised for his performance in the defeat to Swindon.

On 8 December, Vale seemed to be heading for 2–0 defeat at Morecambe with a poor performance when, on 83 minutes, Antony Kay successfully evaded the home side's offside trap on a free kick to pull a goal back, and then Pope scored an equalizing goal four minutes later; Brown then immediately gave away a penalty, which was missed by former Vale striker A-Jay Leitch-Smith to leave the final score at 2–2. Struggling Cheltenham Town came to Burslem the following week amidst awful weather conditions, and just 3,109 spectators witnessed a 2–2 draw, Kay secured a point with a stoppage-time header. No goals were scored in the trip to the league's bottom club Macclesfield Town – a club that had rediscovered their National League winning form under new manager Sol Campbell; the clean sheet and a third consecutive draw were earned largely thanks to some impressive first-half saves from Brown. Grimsby Town were the visitors at Vale Park on Boxing day and they came away with a 1–0 win; Wes Thomas scored the only goal of the game on 62 minutes. Oldham arrived in Burslem three days later, having sacked manager Frankie Bunn following a 6–0 defeat; Vale crashed to a 4–1 defeat to the managerless "Latics" to put intense pressure on Aspin.

Vale travelled to league leaders Lincoln City on New Year's Day and looked to be leaving with a 1–0 defeat despite a very credible performance, before Oyeleke scored a spectacular stoppage-time equaliser to secure a point; after the game Aspin threatened to quit the club after feeling that supporters had shown him a "lack of respect". After taking time to consider his position he said that he would remain as manager as he had the support of the players and the chairman. On 12 January, Vale fell to a 3–0 home defeat to Colchester, losing Pope to a hamstring injury in the process and Aspin bemoaned his side's poor run of luck. Two days later he signed versatile defender Adam Crookes on loan from Nottingham Forest, who had previously been recalled from a loan at Lincoln City after failing to break into the first-team there. Another new arrival was 23-year-old striker Danny Elliott, who was signed following a trial; he had previously been playing in the Spanish Tercera División for San Cristoba. With Pope ruled out of action for over a month with a hamstring injury, Miller was restored to the starting eleven at Crawley on 19 January and scored the only goal of the game to maintain the club's five-point gap above the relegation zone. Aspin went on to bring in 20-year-old Wales youth international forward Mark Harris on loan from Cardiff City. However, he was again facing questions over his own future following a 1–0 home defeat to promotion-chasing Carlisle United; Vale had actually looked good for a point until conceding a deflected goal on 79 minutes despite having Miller sent off for a reckless challenge just before half-time. They closed out the month with a 0–0 draw at Newport County, though ended a third consecutive game with only ten men as Gibbons was given a straight red card with five minutes left to play. Aspin tendered his resignation the following day, stating that "I am very proud of the job we [he and assistant Lee Nogan] did in keeping the club in League Two and we leave the club in a better place on and off the pitch". Despite having no manager, the club completed the loan signing of West Bromwich Albion defender Kyle Howkins, who had joined the club on loan at the same point of the 2017–18 season. Three more young midfield players were also signed, Callum Whelan and Toby Edser on loan from Manchester United and Nottingham Forest respectively, and Daniel Trickett-Smith from Leek Town – who was immediately returned on loan to Leek.

Former Macclesfield and Shrewsbury boss John Askey was appointed as the club's new manager on 4 February, signing a contract to run until the end of the season; he named Dave Kevan as his assistant. Five days later he took charge of his first game away at 20th-placed Cambridge, who leapfrogged the Vale with a 1–0 win. Askey named the same team at home to 22nd-placed Morecambe, and despite dominating the first-half they failed to score past an in-form Mark Halstead, with Pope missing a penalty; a 75th-minute Aaron Collins goal won all three points for the visitors, dragging Vale to within just five points of the bottom of the league. A 2–1 defeat at home to Tranmere three days later left Vale in 21st-place; James Norwood bagged a brace, before Whitfield's consolation ended Vale's club-record run of 571 minutes without scoring a goal. Askey switched to 4–4–2 and instigated four personnel changes for the trip to Cheltenham Town, but the result was a fourth straight defeat and a run of one goal scored in seven matches. Vale had a goal wrongly disallowed for offside against Cheltenham and launched an official complaint to the Match Official Administration System, also citing six further major incidents in games earlier in the season that had cost the club vital points.

Vale faced a crucial trip to Meadow Lane to face bottom-club Notts County on 2 March and kept a clean sheet and extended their gap over the relegation zone to four points with a goalless draw, though they dominated the game and wasted numerous chances to secure a much needed victory. Third-placed Mansfield then came to Burslem, with both sides' top-scorer absent (Pope injured and Tyler Walker suspended); Miller came into the side and scored two early second-half goals to secure an important 2–1 win, with Brown again impressing after saving a first-half penalty given away by Legge. Three days later Vale put themselves eight points clear of the relegation zone with a comfortable 3–0 home win over Yeovil; Oyeleke, Conlon and Montaño were the scorers; Colnon's goal was a goal of the season contender, and he and David Worrall played particularly well in a dominant midfield performance. The unbeaten run stretched to four games with a 0–0 draw in fierce windy conditions at Swindon. Forest Green ended the unbeaten run after the play-off chasing visitors left Burslem with a 2–0 victory, Reece Brown bagging a brace in the last minute of stoppage time after breaking the deadlock on 69 minutes; Askey bemoaned "poor" officiating in his post-match interview. Vale seemed to be heading for a defeat at Northampton after Legge was sent off just before half-time with the "Cobblers" 1–0 ahead, but Worrall scored a 44th-minute equaliser and Pope came on to convert a 75th-minute penalty; Pope's 100th goal for the club secured a 2–1 victory.

Vale banished any remaining fears of relegation on 6 April by completing the double over local rivals Crewe Alexandra, with Pope scoring the game's only goal on 78 minutes. They faced an uphill battle at Exeter seven days later after Howkins gave away a penalty in the opening minute, and were second-best all afternoon to the play-off hopefuls as the "Grecians" claimed a 2–0 win. Askey then made four changes for the return fixture with Stevenage, but a poor performance saw them slip to a 4–1 defeat, though the scoreline was generous to the "Boro". Askey started with Elliot away at promotion-chasing MK Dons, a 1–1 draw in which Brown saved a first-half penalty and Conlon scored a fine opening goal. However, Askey went on to criticise unnamed squad members for unprofessional behaviour, saying that "...there are things that have gone on in my short stay here that shouldn't go on. I have had to deal with things I have never dealt with in 30 odd years of being in football". Vale's final home game of the season was a 1–0 defeat to Askey's former club Macclesfield, who desperately needed the victory to stay in the league. The defeat set a club record for home league defeats in a season (13). The final away game of the season was a 1–1 draw at already-promoted Bury.

With a final position of 20th being the joint-lowest in the club's history (along with 1979–80 and 2017–18), albeit with an improved points tally of 49, Askey released nine of the ten out of contract players: Dior Angus, Harry Benns, Mike Calveley, Danny Elliott, Luke Hannant, Antony Kay, Michael Tonge, Dan Turner and Theo Vassell, with Sam Hornby the only one to be offered a new deal (he rejected the deal and instead joined Bradford City). He also transfer listed Connell Rawlinson and Ben Whitfield. Askey himself signed a new three-year contract, whilst Leon Legge and David Worrall also signed contract extensions. However, Ricky Miller left the club after his contract was terminated one year early by mutual consent.

=== Finances & ownership issues ===
Norman Smurthwaite formally returned to the Port Vale chairman role on 1 August. The club started a new kit wear deal with Australian firm BLK. The club sold fewer than 3,000 home and away kits throughout the campaign. Smurthwaite was quoted as saying he would provide £400,000 for Aspin to spend in the January transfer window, funded by the proceeds of the cup windfalls and sale of Jordan Hugill. Smurthwaite was hospitalised after being struck by a car whilst walking outside Vale Park on 25 January. Smurthwaite blamed "logistical challenges" for the deal to bring back former top-scorer Marc Richards breaking down on 31 January (transfer deadline day); the club instead signed four youngsters despite having no manager. As the transfer window was closing, the Port Vale Supporters' Club unanimously gave a vote of no confidence in Smurthwaite and elected to begin formal protests against his ownership. Smurthwaite went on to issue a statement to condemn "disgraceful abuse" he had received and to urge supporters not to use "inappropriate language" during protests and to consider the effect of protests on the club and the players; he stated that he was only involved in "major" decisions at the club and left day-to-day decisions to CEO Colin Garlick. Responding to accusations that the club had been operating "on the cheap", chief executive Colin Garlick stated that the club had the tenth-largest playing budget in League Two. On 1 March, Synectics Solutions owners Carol and Kevin Shanahan revealed that Smurthwaite had rejected their improved offer of £3.5 million for the club. When the couple told Smurthwaite they were planning to go public about their offer he texted them to say "sorry not interested. now please get back to your day job and continue the sterling work in the community."

"In Stoke-on-Trent, we don’t expect a Russian billionaire or a sheikh or anything like that – we just want somebody with the community at heart who is willing to build long term. I don’t think we’re asking for much. If we don’t go down this year, it will be the next year or the year after. We can’t keep dicing with danger the way we have. If we go down and he [Smurthwaite] is still there, I don’t think we’ll come back. We’ll be a Chester or a Darlington. I see us just plummeting, because we’re not well run enough to rise up again. It’s been exhausting and demoralising. It’s a heartbreaking time to be a Vale fan".

— Joe Baker, of the Black and Gold protest group.

On 23 March, Smurthwaite claimed that fans protests against him had cost the club a £500,000 stadium sponsorship deal, that he had never received a "formal offer" for the club and that he would put the club into administration if no new owner was in place by 5 May. Carol and Kevin Shanahan immediately put in a new offer for the club, leaving CEO Colin Garlick "very optimistic" of a deal being completed. Smurthwaite then stated that an Asian consortium wanted to enter exclusive talks to buy the club for £2.8m. Carol and Kevin Shanahan signed an exclusivity agreement to buy the club on 2 April. They completed their takeover of both the club and the ground on 7 May, ending Smurthwaite's seven years in charge.

=== Cup competitions ===
The first round draw of the FA Cup saw Port Vale drawn at home to League One side Sunderland. A heavy defeat seemed a distinct possibility after they went 2–0 down inside 20 minutes, but Aspin changed formation and put on Oyeleke, who helped Pope to inspire a goal before half-time, though the team could not find the equaliser and were denied a strong penalty appeal by referee Anthony Backhouse.

Port Vale were drawn at home to League Two rivals Lincoln City in the first round of the EFL Cup and made an early exit after losing 4–0 despite making only three changes from the starting eleven that opened the league campaign. This was the club's biggest home defeat in the competition's history, and the 2,440 attendance was the lowest at Vale Park in the competition since October 1981.

Vale's opponents in the group stage of the EFL Trophy were League One sides Burton Albion and Walsall, along with Academy side Middlesbrough. They opened the group at home to Burton on 9 October and won the 1–0 game thanks to a goal from substitute Ricky Miller; just 601 spectators showed up for the match, a new record low attendance for a first-team fixture at Vale Park. This record was broken seven days later as Vale recorded a 2–0 win over Middlesbrough U21, with Rawlinson joining Miller on the scoresheet. They then went on to finish as group winners after beating Walsall 2–1 at the Bescot Stadium, a game in which Nelson Agho came off the bench to become the youngest player in the club's history at the age of 15 years and 262 days.

In the second round of the EFL Trophy, Vale faced a home tie with Stoke City U21 – the youth team of Potteries derby rivals Stoke City – and easily won the match 4–0 after naming a strong starting eleven, including opening goalscorer Pope. Despite it being their under-21 team, almost 4,000 Stoke fans attended the fixture to make the total attendance 7,940, in what Staffordshire Police described as their biggest footballing operation for 10 years. After the game a portion of Stoke supporters vandalized Vale Park and surrounding areas of Burslem, Chief Superintendent Wayne Jones stated that "We're talking about a minority of 150-200 people who had no interest in the football and were there for the trouble they expected to be played out and intended to cause disorder and damage." Smurthwaite estimated the repair bill at being close to £100,000.

On 8 January, third round opponents Shrewsbury Town visited Vale Park and made 11 changes to their side that drew with Stoke City in the FA Cup three days earlier. The League One "Shrews" still proved a challenge and it took an 83rd-minute strike from Pope to take the game to a penalty shoot-out, which Vale won 4–3 whilst Aspin faced away as he was too nervous to watch. Vale exited the competition at the quarter-final stage after falling to a 3–0 defeat at struggling League One side Bristol Rovers; Conlon picked up two bookings shortly after half-time and a 61st-minute Tom Nichols penalty then stretched Bristol's lead to two goals and cued up a comfortable win for the home side.

== Results ==
=== Pre-season ===
6 July 2018 Friendly	Redditch United	1–1	Port Vale	Redditch
19:45 BST	Sinclair 90'	Report	Angus 45+2' (pen.)	Stadium: The Valley Stadium

7 July 2018 Friendly	Kidsgrove Athletic	1–1	Port Vale	Kidsgrove
12:30 BST	Malbon 40'	Report	Dodds 21'	Stadium: Hollinwood Road

14 July 2018 Friendly	Port Vale	1–1	Blackburn Rovers	Burslem
12:30 BST	Mulgrew 9' (og.)	Report	Lenihan 23'	Stadium: Vale Park; Attendance: 966; Referee: Oli Yates

17 July 2018 Friendly	FC Halifax Town	2–3	Port Vale	Halifax
19:45 BST	Maher 15' "Trialist #19" 89'	Report	Pope 41'; Worrall 47', 50'	Stadium: The Shay; Attendance: 376; Referee: Sam Barrott

18 July 2018 Friendly	Nuneaton Borough	2–2	Port Vale	Nuneaton
19:00 BST	Angus 19'; Andoh	Report	Kanu (pen.); Dodds 75'	Stadium: Liberty Way; Attendance: 138

21 July 2018 Friendly	Port Vale	0–1	Blackpool	Burslem
15:00 BST		Report	Delfouneso 5'	Stadium: Vale Park

24 July 2018 Friendly	Port Vale	2–2	Wolverhampton Wanderers U23	Burslem
19:45 BST	Ebanks-Landell 8' (og.); Dodds 37'	Report	Żyro 28'; Glandon 39'	Stadium: Vale Park; Attendance: 713

28 July 2018 Friendly	Port Vale	2–4	Shrewsbury Town	Burslem
15:00 BST	Rawlinson 32'; Pope 63'	Report	Whalley 36'; Amadi-Holloway 38', 49'; John-Lewis 77'	Stadium: Vale Park; Attendance: 996

29 July 2018 Friendly	Newcastle Town	1–1	Port Vale	Newcastle-under-Lyme
15:00 BST	Ward 77'	Report	Kanu 37'	Stadium: Lyme Valley Stadium; Attendance: 305

=== EFL League Two ===
==== League table ====
Pos	Team	Pld	W	D	L	GF	GA	GD	Pts
18	Morecambe	46	14	12	20	54	70	−16	54
19	Crawley Town	46	15	8	23	51	68	−17	53
20	Port Vale	46	12	13	21	39	55	−16	49
21	Cambridge United	46	12	11	23	40	66	−26	47
22	Macclesfield Town	46	10	14	22	48	74	−26	44

Source: EFL Official Website
Rules for classification: 1) Points; 2) Goal difference; 3) Number of goals scored; 4) Head-to-head results

==== Results by matchday ====
Round	1	2	3	4	5	6	7	8	9	10	11	12	13	14	15	16	17	18	19	20	21	22	23	24	25	26	27	28	29	30	31	32	33	34	35	36	37	38	39	40	41	42	43	44	45	46
Ground	H	A	H	A	A	H	A	H	A	H	H	A	H	A	A	H	H	A	H	A	A	H	A	H	H	A	H	A	H	A	A	H	H	A	A	H	H	A	H	A	H	A	H	A	H	A
Result	W	L	W	L	L	L	D	W	W	D	L	L	L	W	D	W	D	L	L	W	D	D	D	L	L	D	L	W	L	D	L	L	L	L	D	W	W	D	L	W	W	L	L	D	L	D
Position	4	10	5	11	15	19	17	16	13	16	16	16	16	16	16	14	13	15	17	16	15	15	15	16	17	19	19	18	19	18	20	20	21	22	22	21	21	20	21	19	18	18	19	20	20	20
Points	3	3	6	6	6	6	7	10	13	14	14	14	14	17	18	21	22	22	22	25	26	27	28	28	28	29	29	32	32	33	33	33	33	33	34	37	40	41	41	44	47	47	47	48	48	49

Source: Statto
A = Away; H = Home; W = Win; D = Draw; L = Loss

==== Matches ====
4 August 2018 1	Port Vale	3–0	Cambridge United	Burslem
15:00 BST	Miller 45+2'; Pope 47' (pen.), 69'	Report		Stadium: Vale Park; Attendance: 5,559; Referee: Trevor Kettle; Assistant referees: David Plowright, Darren Wilding; Fourth official: Matthew Smith

11 August 2018 2	Colchester United	2–0	Port Vale	Colchester
15:00 BST	Senior 8'; Jackson 23'	Report		Stadium: Colchester Community Stadium; Attendance: 3,183; Referee: Matt Donohue; Assistant referees: Stephen Finch, Nicholas Cooper; Fourth official: Adrian Waters

18 August 2018 3	Port Vale	1–0	Crawley Town	Burslem
15:00 BST	Hannant 20'	Report		Stadium: Vale Park; Attendance: 4,159; Referee: Paul Marsden; Assistant referees: David Benton, Richard Wigglesworth; Fourth official: Matthew Jones

21 August 2018 4	Carlisle United	2–1	Port Vale	Carlisle
19:45 BST	Grainger 30' (pen.); Parkes 84'	Report	Hannant 88'	Stadium: Brunton Park; Attendance: 3,688; Referee: Ben Toner; Assistant referees: Barry Gordon, Richard Wild; Fourth official: Andy Haines

25 August 2018 5	Tranmere Rovers	1–0	Port Vale	Birkenhead
15:00 BST	Norwood 77'	Report		Stadium: Prenton Park; Attendance: 6,488; Referee: Dean Whitestone; Assistant referees: Gareth Mellor, Gary Hilton; Fourth official: Lewis Smith

1 September 2018 6	Port Vale	1–2	Newport County	Burslem
15:00 BST	Pope 27'	Report	Bennett 18'; Butler 48'	Stadium: Vale Park; Attendance: 4,485; Referee: Martin Coy; Assistant referees: Matthew Parry, Joe Simpson; Fourth official: James Mainwaring

8 September 2018 7	Forest Green Rovers	1–1	Port Vale	Nailsworth
15:00 BST	Winchester 15'	Report	Pope 73' (pen.)	Stadium: The New Lawn; Attendance: 2,263; Referee: Alan Young; Assistant referees: Andy Hendley, Steven Plane; Fourth official: Ben Cobb

15 September 2018 8	Port Vale	2–0	Northampton Town	Burslem
15:00 BST	Whitfield 24'; Oyeleke 69'	Report		Stadium: Vale Park; Attendance: 4,474; Referee: Thomas Bramall; Assistant referees: Ken Haycock, Nicholas Barnard; Fourth official: Ian Dudley

22 September 2018 9	Crewe Alexandra	0–1	Port Vale	Crewe
15:00 BST		Report	Legge 75'	Stadium: Alexandra Stadium; Attendance: 6,180; Referee: Darren Drysdale; Assistant referees: Marvyn Amphlett, Helen Byrne; Fourth official: Abbas Khan

29 September 2018 10	Port Vale	1–1	Exeter City	Burslem
15:00 BST	Kanu 90+7'	Report	Law 48'	Stadium: Vale Park; Attendance: 4,615; Referee: Seb Stockbridge; Assistant referees: Ian Smedley, Richard Wigglesworth; Fourth official: Dumitru-Ravel Cheosiaua

2 October 2018 11	Port Vale	0–2	Milton Keynes Dons	Burslem
19:45 BST		Report	Aneke 23'; Agard 31'	Stadium: Vale Park; Attendance: 3,399; Referee: Ross Joyce; Assistant referees: Matthew Parry, Ian Dudley; Fourth official: Joe Hull

6 October 2018 12	Grimsby Town	2–0	Port Vale	Cleethorpes
15:00 BST	Thomas 1'; Hooper 53'	Report		Stadium: Blundell Park; Attendance: 3,842; Referee: Andy Haines; Assistant referees: Matthew Jones, Wayne Grunnill; Fourth official: Alix Pashley

13 October 2018 13	Port Vale	2–6	Lincoln City	Burslem
15:00 BST	Conlon 51'; Whitfield 90+4' (pen.)	Report	Anderson 3'; McCartan 38'; Legge 45+5' (og.); Bostwick 48'; Wharton 78'; Wilson 84'	Stadium: Vale Park; Attendance: 5,137; Referee: Brett Huxtable; Assistant referees: Joe Clark, Richard Bartlett; Fourth official: Alan Clayton

20 October 2018 14	Oldham Athletic	0–1	Port Vale	Oldham
15:00 BST			Pope 37' (pen.)	Stadium: Boundary Park; Attendance: 4,323; Referee: Peter Wright; Assistant referees: Geoffrey Liddle, Peter Gooch; Fourth official: Richard Woodward

23 October 2018 15	Stevenage	0–0	Port Vale	Stevenage
19:45 BST		Report		Stadium: Broadhall Way; Referee: Charles Breakspear; Assistant referees: Michael Webb, Richard Kendall; Fourth official: Paul Howard

27 October 2018 16	Port Vale	1–0	Bury	Burslem
15:00 BST	Pope 51'	Report		Stadium: Vale Park; Attendance: 4,375; Referee: Alan Young; Assistant referees: Anthony Moore, Christopher Kidd; Fourth official: Wade Smith

3 November 2018 17	Port Vale	2–2	Notts County	Burslem
15:00 GMT	Hannant 13'; Pope 89'	Report	Hemmings 22'; Ward 87'	Stadium: Vale Park; Attendance: 4,236; Referee: Lee Swabey; Assistant referees: Ian Smedley, Darren Wilding; Fourth official: Lisa Rashid

17 November 2018 18	Mansfield Town	1–0	Port Vale	Mansfield
15:00 GMT	Hamilton 41'	Report		Stadium: Field Mill; Attendance: 4,316; Referee: Martin Coy; Assistant referees: Steven Plane, Robert Atkin; Fourth official: Abbas Khan

24 November 2018 19	Port Vale	0–1	Swindon Town	Burslem
15:00 GMT		Report	Adebayo 11'	Stadium: Vale Park; Attendance: 3,877; Referee: Peter Wright; Assistant referees: Billy Khatib, Mark Cunliffe; Fourth official: Paul Hobday

27 November 2018 20	Yeovil Town	0–3	Port Vale	Yeovil
19:45 GMT		Report	Montaño 13', 48'; Rawlinson 31'	Stadium: Huish Park; Attendance: 2,174; Referee: Lee Collins; Assistant referees: Mark Pottage, Justin Amey; Fourth official: Matthew Lee

8 December 2018 21	Morecambe	2–2	Port Vale	Morecambe
15:00 GMT	Leitch-Smith 27'; Oswell 40'	Report	Kay 83'; Pope 87'	Stadium: Globe Arena; Attendance: 1,769; Referee: Andy Haines; Assistant referees: Simon Clayton, Barry Gordon; Fourth official: Barry Cropp

15 December 2018 22	Port Vale	2–2	Cheltenham Town	Burslem
15:00 GMT	Montaño 13'; Kay 90+3'	Report	Jones 26'; Atangana 89'	Stadium: Vale Park; Attendance: 3,109; Referee: Graham Salisbury; Assistant referees: Anthony Moore, David Benton; Fourth official: Natalie Aspinall

22 December 2018 23	Macclesfield Town	0–0	Port Vale	Macclesfield
15:00 GMT		Report		Stadium: Moss Rose; Attendance: 3,951; Referee: Darren Drysdale; Assistant referees: Lisa Rashid, Dumitru-Ravel Cheosiaua; Fourth official: Matthew Parry

26 December 2018 24	Port Vale	0–1	Grimsby Town	Burslem
15:00 GMT		Report	Thomas 62'	Stadium: Vale Park; Attendance: 5,129; Referee: Ben Toner; Assistant referees: Marvyn Amphlett, Declan Ford; Fourth official: Christopher Ward

29 December 2018 25	Port Vale	1–4	Oldham Athletic	Burslem
15:00 GMT	Whitfield 39'	Report	Lang 32'; Maouche 53'; Nepomuceno 86'; O'Grady 90+3'	Stadium: Vale Park; Attendance: 4,435; Referee: Paul Marsden; Assistant referees: Hristo Karaivanov, Joe Simpson; Fourth official: Craig Taylor

1 January 2019 26	Lincoln City	1–1	Port Vale	Lincoln
15:00 GMT	McCartan 58'	Report	Oyeleke 90'	Stadium: Sincil Bank; Attendance: 9,106; Referee: Peter Wright; Assistant referees: Abbas Khan, Anthony Moore; Fourth official: Joe Clark

12 January 2019 27	Port Vale	0–3	Colchester United	Burslem
15:00 GMT		Report	Senior 5'; Pell 18', 69'	Stadium: Vale Park; Attendance: 3,636; Referee: Scott Oldham; Assistant referees: Richard Bartlett, Gary Hilton; Fourth official: Paul Hobday

19 January 2019 28	Crawley Town	0–1	Port Vale	Crawley
15:00 GMT		Report	Miller 27'	Stadium: Broadfield Stadium; Attendance: 2,089; Referee: Dean Whitestone; Assistant referees: Nicholas Cooper, Andrew Aylott; Fourth official: Christopher Wade

26 January 2019 29	Port Vale	0–1	Carlisle United	Burslem
15:00 GMT		Report	Simpson 79'	Stadium: Vale Park; Attendance: 3,881; Referee: Charles Breakspear; Assistant referees: Christopher Ward, Richard Wigglesworth; Fourth official: Wade Smith

29 January 2019 30	Newport County	0–0	Port Vale	Newport, Wales
19:45 GMT		Report		Stadium: Rodney Parade; Attendance: 2,534; Referee: Neil Hair; Assistant referees: Kevin Morris, Christopher Kidd; Fourth official: Daniel Leach

9 February 2019 31	Cambridge United	1–0	Port Vale	Cambridge
15:00 GMT	Amoo 19'	Report		Stadium: Abbey Stadium; Attendance: 4,193; Referee: Seb Stockbridge; Assistant referees: Andrew Williams, Gareth Viccars; Fourth official: David Rock

16 February 2019 32	Port Vale	0–1	Morecambe	Burslem
15:00 GMT		Report	Collins 75'	Stadium: Vale Park; Attendance: 4,147; Referee: John Busby; Assistant referees: Richard Wild, Andy Hendley; Fourth official: Scott Oldham

19 February 2019 33	Port Vale	1–2	Tranmere Rovers	Burslem
19:45 GMT	Whitfield 59'	Report	Norwood 10', 56'	Stadium: Vale Park; Attendance: 3,835; Referee: Craig Hicks; Assistant referees: Paul Newhouse, Robert Atkin; Fourth official: Dumitru-Ravel Cheosiaua
Note: Original fixture was postponed on 1 February 2019, due to freezing temperatures and the impending weather forecast.

23 February 2019 34	Cheltenham Town	1–0	Port Vale	Cheltenham
15:00 GMT	Varney 34'	Report		Stadium: Whaddon Road; Attendance: 3,079; Referee: Peter Wright; Assistant referees: Mark Griffiths, Grant Taylor; Fourth official: Paul Hobday

2 March 2019 35	Notts County	0–0	Port Vale	Nottingham
15:00 GMT		Report		Stadium: Meadow Lane; Attendance: 7,457; Referee: Craig Hicks; Assistant referees: Gareth Mellor, Matthew Parry; Fourth official: Joe Clark

9 March 2019 36	Port Vale	2–1	Mansfield Town	Burslem
15:00 GMT	Miller 50', 52'	Report	Ajose 61'	Stadium: Vale Park; Attendance: 5,231; Referee: Darren Bond; Assistant referees: Mark Dwyer, Adam Matthews; Fourth official: James Adcock

12 March 2019 37	Port Vale	3–0	Yeovil Town	Burslem
19:45 GMT	Oyeleke 26'; Conlon 62'; Montaño 84'	Report		Stadium: Vale Park; Attendance: 3,430; Referee: Geoff Eltringham; Assistant referees: James Wilson, Jonathan Hunt; Fourth official: Matt Donohue

16 March 2019 38	Swindon Town	0–0	Port Vale	Swindon
15:00 GMT		Report		Stadium: County Ground; Attendance: 6,322; Referee: Darren Drysdale; Assistant referees: Stephen Brown, Christopher Husband; Fourth official: Marvyn Amphlett

23 March 2019 39	Port Vale	0–2	Forest Green Rovers	Burslem
15:00 GMT		Report	Brown 69', 90+4'	Stadium: Vale Park; Attendance: 4,429; Referee: Paul Marsden; Assistant referees: Hristo Karaivanov, Kevin Morris; Fourth official: Darren Wilding

30 March 2019 40	Northampton Town	1–2	Port Vale	Northampton
15:00 GMT	Hoskins 5'	Report	Worrall 44'; Pope 75' (pen.)	Stadium: Sixfields Stadium; Attendance: 5,651; Referee: Neil Hair; Assistant referees: Christopher Ward, Richard Wigglesworth; Fourth official: Matthew Jones

6 April 2019 41	Port Vale	1–0	Crewe Alexandra	Burslem
15:00 BST	Pope 78'	Report		Stadium: Vale Park; Attendance: 6,823; Referee: Andy Davies; Assistant referees: Mark Dwyer, Adam Crysell; Fourth official: Daniel Middleton

13 April 2019 42	Exeter City	2–0	Port Vale	Exeter
15:00 BST	Law 2' (pen.); Boateng 55'	Report		Stadium: St James Park; Attendance: 4,013; Referee: Tom Nield; Assistant referees: Justin Amey, Christopher Wade; Fourth official: James Durkin

19 April 2019 43	Port Vale	1–4	Stevenage	Burslem
15:00 BST	Montaño 67'	Report	Sonupe 12', 50'; Chair 84'; Guthrie 90+5'	Stadium: Vale Park; Attendance: 4,088; Referee: Nick Kinseley; Assistant referees: Lisa Rashid, Matthew Smith; Fourth official: Abbas Khan

22 April 2019 44	Milton Keynes Dons	1–1	Port Vale	Milton Keynes
15:00 BST	Wheeler 52'	Report	Conlon 48'	Stadium: Stadium MK; Attendance: 8,386; Referee: Alan Young; Assistant referees: Paul Hobday, Declan Ford; Fourth official: Ian Cooper

27 April 2019 45	Port Vale	0–1	Macclesfield Town	Burslem
15:00 BST		Report	Fitzpatrick 66'	Stadium: Vale Park; Attendance: 5,414; Referee: Carl Boyeson; Assistant referees: David Avent, Richard Bartlett; Fourth official: Jonathan Hunt

4 May 2019 46	Bury	1–1	Port Vale	Bury
15:00 BST	Rossiter 45'	Report	Pope 24'	Stadium: Gigg Lane; Attendance: 6,719; Referee: Eddie Ilderton; Assistant referees: Nicholas Barnard, Stephen Wade; Fourth official: Matthew Parry

=== FA Cup ===
11 November 2018 R1	Port Vale	1–2	Sunderland	Burslem
14:30 GMT	Pope 35'	Report	Honeyman 1'; Gooch 19'	Stadium: Vale Park; Attendance: 7,238; Referee: Anthony Backhouse; Assistant referees: Alix Pashley, Marvyn Amphlett; Fourth official: Peter Wright

=== EFL Cup ===
14 August 2018 R1	Port Vale	0–4	Lincoln City	Burslem
19:45 BST		Report	Shackell 5'; Green 48' (pen.); O'Connor 80'; Akinde 82'	Stadium: Vale Park; Attendance: 2,440; Referee: Robert Lewis; Assistant referees: Mark Cunliffe, Ian Smedley; Fourth official: Thomas Harty

=== EFL Trophy ===
Pos	Lge	Team	Pld	W	PW	PL	L	GF	GA	GD	Pts	Qualification
1	L2	Port Vale	3	3	0	0	0	5	1	+4	9	Round 2
2	L1	Walsall	3	2	0	0	1	6	4	+2	6	Round 2
3	ACA	Middlesbrough U21	3	1	0	0	2	2	5	−3	3	
4	L1	Burton Albion	3	0	0	0	3	1	4	−3	0	

Source: EFL.com

9 October 2018 Group stage	Port Vale	1–0	Burton Albion	Burslem
19:45 BST	Miller 65'	Report		Stadium: Vale Park; Attendance: 601; Referee: Robert Lewis; Assistant referees: Thomas Harty, Richard Woodward; Fourth official: Martin Woods

16 October 2018 Group stage	Port Vale	2–0	Middlesbrough U21	Burslem
19:45 BST	Miller 6'; Rawlinson 66'	Report		Stadium: Vale Park; Attendance: 554; Referee: Matthew Donohue; Assistant referees: Christopher Ward, Kevin Morris; Fourth official: Scott Oldham

13 November 2018 Group stage	Walsall	1–2	Port Vale	Walsall
19:00 GMT	Johnson 45+1'	Report	Quigley 4'; Pugh 65'	Stadium: Bescot Stadium; Attendance: 878; Assistant referees: Hristo Karaivanov, Lee Freeman; Fourth official: Ian Dudley

4 December 2018 R2	Port Vale	4–0	Stoke City U21	Burslem
19:45 GMT	Pope 6'; Montaño 40', 42'; Hannant 66'	Report		Stadium: Vale Park; Attendance: 7,940; Assistant referees: Gareth Mellor, Richard Woodward; Fourth official: Matt Donohue

8 January 2019 R3	Port Vale	1–1 (4–3 p)	Shrewsbury Town	Burslem
19:45 GMT	Pope 83'	Report	Sears 63'	Stadium: Vale Park; Attendance: 1,355; Referee: Eddie Ilderton; Assistant referees: Nicholas Barnard, Gareth Mellor; Fourth official: Chris Sarginson
	Penalties
	Oyeleke (penalty scored); Miller (penalty scored); Pope (penalty missed); Kay (penalty scored); Hannant (penalty scored)		Okenabirhie (penalty scored); Gilliead (penalty missed); Angol (penalty scored); Eisa (penalty missed); Barnett (penalty scored)

22 January 2019 Quarter-final	Bristol Rovers	3–0	Port Vale	Horfield
19:45 GMT	Clarke 16'; Nichols 62' (pen.); Rodman 68'	Report		Stadium: Memorial Stadium; Attendance: 2,016; Referee: Matthew Donohue; Assistant referees: Grant Taylor, Darren Wilding; Fourth official: Chris Sarginson

== Squad statistics ==
=== Appearances and goals ===
Key to positions: GK – Goalkeeper; DF – Defender; MF – Midfielder; FW – Forward

No.	Pos	Nat	Player	Total		EFL League Two		FA Cup		EFL Cup		EFL Trophy	
No.	Pos	Nat	Player	Apps	Goals	Apps	Goals	Apps	Goals	Apps	Goals	Apps	Goals
1	GK	(England) ENG	Scott Brown	51	0	46	0	1	0	1	0	3	0
2	DF	(England) ENG	James Gibbons	19	0	15	0	0	0	0	0	4	0
3	MF	(Colombia) COL	Cristian Montaño	33	7	29	5	1	0	1	0	2	2
4	MF	(England) ENG	Luke Joyce	42	0	37	0	1	0	0	0	4	0
5	DF	(England) ENG	Leon Legge	37	1	35	1	1	0	1	0	0	0
6	DF	(England) ENG	Antony Kay	33	2	27	2	0	0	1	0	5	0
7	MF	(England) ENG	David Worrall	29	1	25	1	0	0	1	0	3	0
8	MF	(England) ENG	Manny Oyeleke	33	3	28	3	1	0	1	0	3	0
9	FW	(England) ENG	Tom Pope	41	14	38	11	1	1	0	0	2	2
10	FW	(England) ENG	Ricky Miller	35	6	28	4	1	0	1	0	5	2
11	MF	(England) ENG	Luke Hannant	50	4	45	3	1	0	1	0	3	1
12	GK	(England) ENG	Sam Hornby	3	0	0	0	0	0	0	0	3	0
13	DF	(Wales) WAL	Connell Rawlinson	36	2	28	1	1	0	1	0	6	1
14	DF	(England) ENG	Adam Crookes	19	0	19	0	0	0	0	0	0	0
15	DF	(England) ENG	Nathan Smith	51	0	44	0	1	0	1	0	5	0
16	MF	(England) ENG	Danny Pugh	4	1	1	0	0	0	0	0	3	1
17	FW	(England) ENG	Danny Elliott	7	0	6	0	0	0	0	0	1	0
18	MF	(England) ENG	Michael Tonge	1	0	1	0	0	0	0	0	0	0
20	FW	(England) ENG	Dior Angus	1	0	0	0	0	0	0	0	1	0
21	DF	(England) ENG	Theo Vassell	22	0	15	0	1	0	1	0	5	0
22	MF	(England) ENG	Tom Conlon	39	3	34	3	1	0	0	0	4	0
23	DF	(Wales) WAL	Mitch Clark	45	0	40	0	1	0	0	0	4	0
24	MF	(England) ENG	Ben Whitfield	33	4	30	4	1	0	0	0	2	0
26	FW	(Spain) ESP	Nelson Agho	1	0	0	0	0	0	0	0	1	0
27	MF	(England) ENG	Toby Edser	0	0	0	0	0	0	0	0	0	0
28	MF	(England) ENG	Mike Calveley	1	0	1	0	0	0	0	0	0	0
29	FW	(England) ENG	Dan Turner	0	0	0	0	0	0	0	0	0	0
30	MF	(England) ENG	Lucas Green-Birch	0	0	0	0	0	0	0	0	0	0
	MF	(England) ENG	Harry Benns	0	0	0	0	0	0	0	0	0	0
	MF	(England) ENG	Daniel Trickett-Smith	0	0	0	0	0	0	0	0	0	0
Players who featured but departed the club during the season:
14	FW	(England) ENG	Scott Quigley	13	1	11	0	0	0	1	0	1	1
17	FW	(Sierra Leone) SLE	Idris Kanu	7	1	3	1	0	0	1	0	3	0
19	FW	(England) ENG	Louis Dodds	17	0	12	0	0	0	1	0	4	0
19	FW	(Wales) WAL	Mark Harris	6	0	6	0	0	0	0	0	0	0
20	MF	(England) ENG	Brendon Daniels	1	0	0	0	0	0	0	0	1	0
25	MF	(England) ENG	Lewis Hardcastle	9	0	6	0	0	0	0	0	3	0
25	MF	(England) ENG	Callum Whelan	0	0	0	0	0	0	0	0	0	0
33	DF	(England) ENG	Kyle Howkins	3	0	3	0	0	0	0	0	0	0
	FW	(England) ENG	Tyrone Barnett	0	0	0	0	0	0	0	0	0	0
	DF	(England) ENG	Joe Davis	0	0	0	0	0	0	0	0	0	0
	GK	(England) ENG	Rob Lainton	0	0	0	0	0	0	0	0	0	0

=== Top scorers ===
Place	Position	Nation	Number	Name	EFL League Two	FA Cup	EFL Cup	EFL Trophy	Total
1	FW	England	9	Tom Pope	11	1	0	2	14
2	MF	Colombia	3	Cristian Montaño	5	0	0	2	7
3	FW	England	10	Ricky Miller	4	0	0	2	6
4	MF	England	11	Luke Hannant	3	0	0	1	4
–	MF	England	24	Ben Whitfield	4	0	0	0	4
6	MF	England	22	Tom Conlon	3	0	0	0	3
–	MF	England	8	Manny Oyeleke	3	0	0	0	3
8	MF	England	6	Antony Kay	2	0	0	0	2
–	DF	Wales	13	Connell Rawlinson	1	0	0	1	2
10	FW	Sierra Leone	17	Idris Kanu	1	0	0	0	1
–	DF	England	5	Leon Legge	1	0	0	0	1
–	MF	England	16	Danny Pugh	0	0	0	1	1
–	FW	England	14	Scott Quigley	0	0	0	1	1
–	MF	England	7	David Worrall	1	0	0	0	1
				TOTALS	38	1	0	10	49

=== Disciplinary record ===
Number	Nation	Position	Name	EFL League Two		FA Cup		EFL Cup		EFL Trophy		Total	
Number	Nation	Position	Name	Yellow card	Red card	Yellow card	Red card	Yellow card	Red card	Yellow card	Red card	Yellow card	Red card
22	England	MF	Tom Conlon	7	0	0	0	0	0	1	1	8	1
10	England	FW	Ricky Miller	7	1	0	0	0	0	1	0	8	1
2	England	DF	James Gibbons	2	1	0	0	0	0	2	0	4	1 (Note: James Gibbons' red card against Newport County on 29 January was rescinded on appeal.)
5	England	DF	Leon Legge	4	1	0	0	0	0	0	0	4	1
8	England	MF	Manny Oyeleke	3	1	0	0	0	0	0	0	3	1
11	England	MF	Luke Hannant	9	0	0	0	0	0	1	0	10	0
23	Wales	DF	Mitch Clark	7	0	0	0	0	0	1	0	8	0
4	England	MF	Luke Joyce	4	0	1	0	0	0	1	0	6	0
6	England	MF	Antony Kay	5	0	0	0	0	0	1	0	6	0
3	Colombia	MF	Cristian Montaño	5	0	0	0	1	0	0	0	6	0
9	England	FW	Tom Pope	6	0	0	0	0	0	0	0	6	0
21	England	DF	Theo Vassell	4	0	0	0	0	0	1	0	5	0
13	Wales	DF	Connell Rawlinson	3	0	0	0	0	0	1	0	4	0
15	England	DF	Nathan Smith	4	0	0	0	0	0	0	0	4	0
7	England	MF	David Worrall	3	0	0	0	0	0	0	0	3	0
1	England	GK	Scott Brown	2	0	0	0	0	0	0	0	2	0
14	England	DF	Adam Crookes	2	0	0	0	0	0	0	0	2	0
19	England	FW	Louis Dodds	1	0	0	0	1	0	0	0	2	0
25	England	MF	Lewis Hardcastle	2	0	0	0	0	0	0	0	2	0
14	England	FW	Scott Quigley	2	0	0	0	0	0	0	0	2	0
17	Sierra Leone	FW	Idris Kanu	1	0	0	0	0	0	0	0	1	0
16	England	DF	Danny Pugh	0	0	0	0	0	0	1	0	1	0
			TOTALS	83	4	1	0	2	0	11	1	97	5

Sourced from Soccerway.

== Awards ==
End of Season Awards	Winner
Player of the Year	Scott Brown
Official Away Travel Player of the Year	Scott Brown
Errol Yorke Award	Scott Brown
Players' Player of the Year	Scott Brown
Young Player of the Year	Nathan Smith
PFA Community Champion	Tom Pope
Youth Player of the Year	Ryan Campbell-Gordon
Goal of the Season	Tom Conlon (vs Yeovil Town, 12 March 2019)
Service to Port Vale F.C.	Steve Speed

== Transfers ==
=== Transfers in ===
Date from	Position	Nationality	Name	From	Fee	Ref.
1 July 2018 (Note: The transfer was announced on 14 May and would become official on 1 July once his contract at Wycombe Wanderers expired)	GK	ENG	Scott Brown	Wycombe Wanderers	Free transfer	
1 July 2018 (Note: The transfer was announced on 17 May and would become official on 1 July once his contract at Alfreton Town expired)	LW	ENG	Brendon Daniels	Alfreton Town	Free transfer	
1 July 2018 (Note: The transfer was announced on 17 May and would become official on 1 July once his contract at Carlisle United expired)	DM	ENG	Luke Joyce	Carlisle United	Free transfer	
1 July 2018 (Note: The transfer was announced on 23 May and would become official on 1 July once his contract at Cambridge United expired)	CB	ENG	Leon Legge	Cambridge United	Free transfer	
1 July 2018 (Note: The transfer was announced on 22 June and would become official on 1 July once his contract at Peterborough United expired)	CF	ENG	Ricky Miller	Peterborough United	Undisclosed	
1 July 2018 (Note: The transfer was announced on 1 June and would become official on 1 July once his contract at Aldershot Town expired)	CM	ENG	Manny Oyeleke	Aldershot Town	Free transfer	
1 July 2018 (Note: The transfer was announced on 23 May and would become official on 1 July once his contract at The New Saints expired)	CB	WAL	Connell Rawlinson	(Wales) The New Saints	Free transfer	
1 July 2018 (Note: The transfer was announced on 28 June and would become official on 1 July once his contract at Gateshead expired)	CB	ENG	Theo Vassell	Gateshead	Free transfer	
25 July 2018	CM	ENG	Tom Conlon	Stevenage	Free transfer	
30 August 2018	CM	ENG	Ben Whitfield	AFC Bournemouth	Free transfer	
18 January 2019	CF	ENG	Danny Elliott	(Spain) San Cristóbal	Free transfer	
31 January 2019	AM	ENG	Daniel Trickett-Smith	Leek Town	Undisclosed	

=== Transfers out ===
Date from	Position	Nationality	Name	To	Fee	Ref.
22 November 2018	GK	ENG	Rob Lainton	(Wales) Wrexham	Free transfer	
1 January 2019	LW	ENG	Brendon Daniels	AFC Telford United	Free transfer	
7 January 2019	CF	ENG	Tyrone Barnett	Cheltenham Town	Free transfer	
1 March 2019	CB	ENG	Joe Davis	Nantwich Town	Released	
16 May 2019	CF	ENG	Dior Angus	Barrow	Released	
16 May 2019	MF	ENG	Harry Benns	Hyde United	Released	
16 May 2019	CM	ENG	Mike Calveley	Curzon Ashton	Released	
16 May 2019	CF	ENG	Danny Elliott	Chester	Released	
16 May 2019	CM	ENG	Luke Hannant	Cambridge United	Released	
16 May 2019	CB	ENG	Antony Kay	Chorley	Released	
16 May 2019	CM	ENG	Michael Tonge		Released	
16 May 2019	CF	ENG	Dan Turner	Hyde United	Released	
16 May 2019	RB	ENG	Theo Vassell	Macclesfield Town	Released	
31 May 2019	GK	ENG	Sam Hornby	Bradford City	Rejected contract	
27 June 2019	CF	ENG	Ricky Miller	Aldershot Town	Mutual consent	
30 June 2019	CM	ENG	Danny Pugh	Became a coach		

=== Loans in ===
Start date	Position	Nationality	Name	From	End date	Ref.
1 July 2018	CF	ENG	Louis Dodds	Chesterfield	25 January 2019	.
1 July 2018	CF	SLE	Idris Kanu	Peterborough United	3 January 2019	
5 July 2018	CF	ENG	Scott Quigley	Blackpool	1 January 2019	
16 August 2018	LB	WAL	Mitch Clark	Aston Villa	End of season	
30 August 2018	CM	ENG	Lewis Hardcastle	Blackburn Rovers	7 January 2019	
14 January 2019	LB	ENG	Adam Crookes	Nottingham Forest	End of season	
23 January 2019	LW	WAL	Mark Harris	(Wales) Cardiff City	30 April 2019	
31 January 2019	MF	ENG	Toby Edser	Nottingham Forest	End of season	
31 January 2019	CB	ENG	Kyle Howkins	West Bromwich Albion	30 April 2019	
31 January 2019	DM	ENG	Callum Whelan	Manchester United	2 April 2019	

=== Loans out ===
Start date	Position	Nationality	Name	To	End date	Ref.
1 July 2018	CF	ENG	Dan Turner	(Scotland) Falkirk	5 October 2018	
7 July 2018	GK	ENG	Rob Lainton	(Wales) Wrexham	22 November 2018	
20 July 2018	CF	ENG	Dior Angus	Nuneaton Town	3 January 2019	
20 July 2018	CM	ENG	Mike Calveley	Nuneaton Town	19 April 2019	
29 July 2018	LW	ENG	Brendon Daniels	Altrincham	1 September 2018	
23 August 2018	CM	ENG	Harry Benns	Stafford Rangers	31 December 2018	
30 August 2018	CF	ENG	Tyrone Barnett	Cheltenham Town	7 January 2019	
9 November 2018	CB	ENG	Joe Davis	York City	11 January 2019	
27 November 2018	LW	ENG	Brendon Daniels	AFC Telford United	1 January 2019	
15 January 2019	CF	ENG	Dior Angus	Barrow	End of season	
31 January 2019	AM	ENG	Daniel Trickett-Smith	Leek Town	End of season	
20 March 2019	MF	ENG	Harry Benns	Kidsgrove Athletic	End of season	
