= Luke Joyce =

English footballer (born 1987)

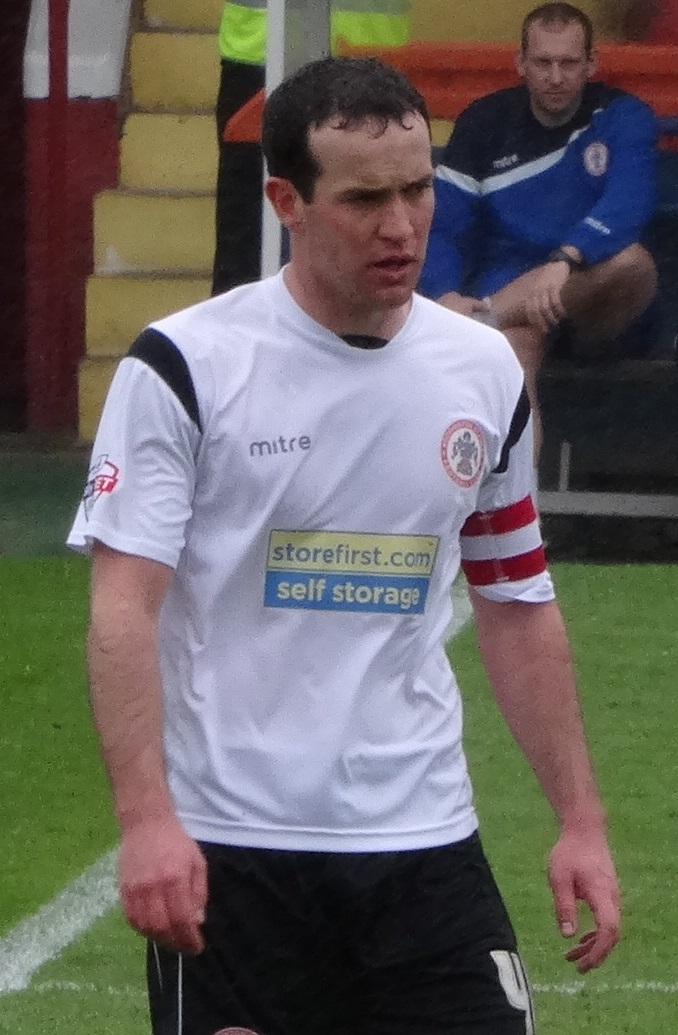
- Joyce playing for Accrington Stanley in 2014

Personal information
- Full name: Luke James Joyce
- Date of birth: 9 July 1987 (age 39)
- Place of birth: Bolton, England
- Height: 5 ft 9 in (1.75 m)
- Position: Defensive midfielder

Youth career
- 1995–1998: Bolton Wanderers
- 2003–2005: Wigan Athletic

Senior career*
Years	Team	Apps	(Gls)
2005–2006	Wigan Athletic	0	(0)
2006–2009	Carlisle United	26	(2)
2008–2009	→ Barrow (loan)	5	(0)
2009	→ Northwich Victoria (loan)	12	(2)
2009–2015	Accrington Stanley	246	(8)
2015–2018	Carlisle United	120	(3)
2018–2021	Port Vale	114	(1)
2021–2022	AFC Fylde	32	(0)
2022–2024	Radcliffe	57	(1)
Total		612	(17)
- * Club domestic league appearances and goals

Luke James Joyce (born 9 July 1987) is an English former professional footballer who is now head of recruitment at EFL League Two club Fleetwood Town. He made 700 league and cup appearances in a 19-year professional playing career.

Joyce was a midfielder who came through the youth team at Wigan Athletic to make his first-team debut in January 2006. He was allowed to sign for Carlisle United six months later, from where he was loaned out to Conference Premier clubs Barrow and Northwich Victoria during the 2008–09 season. He signed with Accrington Stanley in June 2009. He spent the next six years with the club, including over three seasons as captain, making a total of 276 league and cup appearances. He returned to Carlisle United in May 2015 and spent three years with the club, for an overall period of six years and 161 appearances in all competitions over his two spells. He moved on to Port Vale in May 2018, where he would remain a key fixture in the starting eleven for his three seasons at the club. He dropped into non-League football after signing for AFC Fylde in June 2021. He moved on to Radcliffe 12 months later and helped the club to win the 2023 Manchester Premier Cup.

== Career ==
=== Wigan Athletic ===
Joyce was born in Bolton, Greater Manchester, and was at the Academy at Bolton Wanderers from the age of eight until he was released at age ten or eleven. He went on to play Sunday League football and captained the Wigan schools' team. He joined the youth team at Wigan Athletic in June 2003. He made one appearance for the first team, coming on as a substitute for Josip Skoko in extra time of a 3–3 draw at Leeds United in an FA Cup third round replay on 17 January 2006. Manager Paul Jewell said that "he didn't let anybody down" in the game and praised his attitude in training, as did "Latics" youth team coach David Lee. However, Joyce did not make an appearance for the club in the Premier League and was allowed to leave the JJB Stadium at the end of the 2005–06 season.

=== Carlisle United ===
After a short trial, Joyce joined Carlisle United, initially with the club taking over his Wigan scholarship, signing permanently in July 2006. He made his debut in League One as an 85th-minute substitute for Simon Hackney in a 2–0 win over Cheltenham Town at Brunton Park on 3 September. He scored his first senior goal for the "Cumbrians" in a 5–0 victory over Gillingham on 24 March. He was sent off for the first time in his career in a 2–0 defeat at Port Vale on 7 April. He made a total of 16 appearances across the 2006–07 season, helping Neil McDonald's "Blues" to an eighth-place finish. He featured just three times under new manager John Ward during the 2007–08 campaign, though he managed to score his second career goal in a 3–2 win over Port Vale on 5 January.

On 27 November 2008, he joined Conference Premier club Barrow on a one-month loan; "Bluebirds" manager David Bayliss said that "Luke will definitely strengthen us but whether he starts or not remains to be seen". He made his debut at Holker Street in the shock FA Cup second round defeat of Brentford. He remained with the club for five weeks, featuring seven times, before leaving after their FA Cup elimination by Middlesbrough in January 2009. On 13 March 2009, he joined Northwich Victoria on an initial one-month loan. He scored on his debut for the "Vics" two days later in a 4–1 defeat at Cambridge United. He scored two goals in 12 games for Andy Preece's side, who ended the 2008–09 season being relegated out of the Conference Premier. Nevertheless, he said he enjoyed his time at the Victoria Stadium, and upon returning to Carlisle he found that he was to be released by manager Greg Abbott.

=== Accrington Stanley ===
On 25 June 2009, Joyce signed with League Two club Accrington Stanley. He made 50 appearances in the 2009–10 season, scoring one goal. He featured 32 times in the 2010–11 campaign, helping "Accy" to reach the League Two play-offs for the first time, before they were beaten by Stevenage at the semi-final stage. He scored three goals in 47 matches as Stanley finished in 14th-place under the stewardship of Paul Cook at the end of the 2011–12 season; Joyce took over as captain following the departure of Andrew Procter in January 2012. He made 48 appearances across the 2012–13 campaign, with Stanley ending up in 18th-place under new boss Leam Richardson. Joyce played 49 games in the 2013–14 season as Accrington posted a 15th-place finish under the stewardship of rookie manager James Beattie. When the club were bottom of the English Football League in November after failing to win in their first 12 league games, Joyce stood by Beattie, calling him a "good manager and a good bloke". Two months later Beattie returned the favour by calling Joyce an "unsung hero" after he scored his first goal in 22 months to help secure a 2–1 victory over Cheltenham Town. John Coleman returned as manager early in the 2014–15 campaign and kept Joyce as captain, with the midfielder scoring four goals from 50 appearances. Joyce said, "it has been an up and down season... overall, I guess it has been a decent season, we have secured our tenth season in the Football League and that's a massive achievement for the club the size of ours, but we are disappointed we haven't finished further up the league".

"I love Accrington Stanley and it's been like a second home to me for the last six years. They gave me my chance in professional football really because that summer when I left Carlisle nobody else was on the phone really trying to sign me. If it wasn't for Accrington I might not be a professional today. I owe the club a lot and I've thoroughly enjoyed my time. I hope the fans have enjoyed having me. I've enjoyed playing in front of them."

— Joyce wrote the Accrington Stanley fans an open letter after choosing to leave the Crown Ground in May 2015.

=== Return to Carlisle United ===
On 21 May 2015, Joyce turned down a two-year contract with Accrington to rejoin former club Carlisle United on a two-year deal. He made 42 appearances as United posted a tenth-place finish in League Two at the end of the 2015–16 season, though was booed and criticised by some supporters after suffering from poor form in March, which manager Keith Curle blamed on a "nervous period". He helped Carlisle to record a 2–1 win at Queens Park Rangers in the League Cup, before he missed a penalty in Carlisle's penalty shoot-out defeat to Liverpool at Anfield in the third round. Joyce went on to miss just one of Carlisle's 56 games during the 2016–17 season, as the club secured a play-off place with a sixth-place finish before losing to Exeter City in the play-off semi-finals. In the second round of the EFL Cup he helped Carlisle to secure a 1–1 draw at Derby County, and then remarkably converted two penalties as Carlisle were beaten 14–13 following 11 rounds of sudden death in the resulting penalty shoot-out. On 29 October, he scored with a long-range strike in a 3–1 home win over Crawley Town, which ended up winning him that month Goal of the Month award for League Two. In April 2017, it was confirmed that Joyce would remain at the club after triggering a one-year extension to his contract. He scored two goals – adding a tap in at Newport County to his strike against Crawley – in 46 appearances during the 2017–18 as Carlisle went on to finish in tenth-position, before leaving the club after rejecting a new 12-month deal on reduced terms offered to him by the managerless club.

=== Port Vale ===
On 17 May 2018, Joyce signed a two-year contract with League Two side Port Vale; manager Neil Aspin said that "he is comfortable in possession and was impressive against us for Carlisle". He chose to join the "Valiants" despite receiving a better contract offer from a club playing below the English Football League. He started the 2018–19 season in a central midfield partnership with Manny Oyeleke. However, he lost his place to Tom Conlon after Conlon returned to fitness in September, and Joyce went on to admit that "I have not quite performed as well as I would like to and had the influence on games". He continued in indifferent form for the rest of Aspin's tenure and was given permission to look for a new club in January after going seven games without a first-team appearance, though started against Lincoln City on New Year's Day and remained in the first-team thereafter. He became a key player under new manager John Askey in February. He ended the season with 35 starts and seven substitute appearances.

On 18 September 2019, he marked his 500th appearance in a Football League fixture as Vale lost 2–0 at league leaders Exeter City; he quipped that "that probably sums up my career really, Exeter away on a Tuesday night". He scored his first goal for the club on 5 October, levelling the scores in what finished as a 3–1 win over Morecambe at Vale Park. In February 2020, it was announced that Joyce had triggered a clause in his contract to keep him at the club until summer 2021. He scored one goal in 43 appearances throughout the 2019–20 season, missing just one league game due to suspension, providing the defensive cover in the holding midfield role to allow players such as Scott Burgess, Jake Taylor and Tom Conlon to get further forward. He was a joint winner of that season's Players' Player of the Year award, along with David Worrall.

On 14 November 2020, Joyce was sent off for a high tackle when Vale were leading Tranmere Rovers 2–0, and the team went on to lose 4–3 in his absence. The team also lost the three games he missed due to suspension. The losing run continued following his return to the team, leading Joyce to say that "losing games hurts... but we just have to deal with". Joyce featured 46 times in the 2020–21 season, but was one of 15 players released by new manager Darrell Clarke in May 2021. Joyce said that he was disappointed not to be offered a new contract but that "I have taken great pride in playing for Port Vale".

=== AFC Fylde ===
On 28 June 2021, Joyce agreed a one-year deal with National League North club AFC Fylde; manager Jim Bentley stated that "this is a real big signing for the football club. Luke has proven to be one of the best midfielders in League Two over many seasons. His stats are phenomenal, he's an excellent professional and is very well respected within the game". In joining the "Coasters" he rejected the opportunity to stay in League Two with Oldham Athletic. He featured 34 times in the 2021–22 campaign as Fylde finished in third-place, but did not feature in their unsuccessful play-off campaign and was released in the summer by new manager James Rowe.

=== Radcliffe ===
On 20 June 2022, Joyce joined Northern Premier League Premier Division club Radcliffe, having previously been a teammate of manager Bobby Grant at Accrington. He made 46 appearances in the 2022–23 season, including in the Manchester Premier Cup final victory over Wythenshawe Town. In December 2023, the club announced that their fixture against Workington on 6 January 2024 would be the last of Joyce's career, the player retiring to take up a role as Lead North Scout at Brentford.

== Style of play ==
Joyce described himself as a "working player in midfield" who wins the ball and passes it onto more creative teammates. Port Vale manager John Askey stated that "with Luke not only is it his football, his organisation and encouragement helps the other players". His successor, Darrell Clarke, classed Joyce as a deep-lying midfielder.

== Coaching career ==
Joyce holds a UEFA B Licence and by 2019 had set up a junior academy in Westhoughton. He left his position as Lead North Scout at Brentford to take up the position of head of recruitment at Fleetwood Town in December 2025.

== Career statistics ==
Appearances and goals by club, season and competition
Club	Season	League			FA Cup		League Cup		Other		Total	
Club	Season	Division	Apps	Goals	Apps	Goals	Apps	Goals	Apps	Goals	Apps	Goals
Wigan Athletic	2005–06	Premier League	0	0	1	0	0	0	—		1	0
Carlisle United	2006–07	League One	16	1	0	0	0	0	0	0	16	1
Carlisle United	2007–08	League One	3	1	0	0	0	0	0	0	3	1
Carlisle United	2008–09	League One	7	0	0	0	1	0	1 (Note: Appearances in the Football League Trophy)	0	9	0
Carlisle United	Total		26	2	0	0	1	0	1	0	28	2
Barrow (loan)	2008–09	Conference Premier	5	0	2	0	—		0	0	7	0
Northwich Victoria (loan)	2008–09	Conference Premier	12	2	0	0	—		0	0	12	2
Accrington Stanley	2009–10	League Two	41	1	3	0	2	0	4	0	50	1
Accrington Stanley	2010–11	League Two	27	1	1	0	1	0	3 (Note: One appearance in the Football League Trophy and two in the League Two play-offs)	0	32	1
Accrington Stanley	2011–12	League Two	43	2	1	1	1	0	2	0	47	3
Accrington Stanley	2012–13	League Two	44	0	3	0	1	0	0	0	48	0
Accrington Stanley	2013–14	League Two	46	1	1	0	1	0	1	0	49	1
Accrington Stanley	2014–15	League Two	45	3	4	1	0	0	1	0	50	4
Accrington Stanley	Total		246	8	13	2	6	0	11	0	276	10
Carlisle United	2015–16	League Two	37	0	3	0	2	0	0	0	42	0
Carlisle United	2016–17	League Two	45	1	2	0	2	0	6 (Note: Four appearances in the EFL Trophy and two in the League Two play-offs)	0	55	1
Carlisle United	2017–18	League Two	38	2	3	0	2	0	3 (Note: Appearances in the EFL Trophy)	0	46	2
Carlisle United	Total		120	3	8	0	6	0	9	0	143	3
Port Vale	2018–19	League Two	37	0	1	0	0	0	4	0	42	0
Port Vale	2019–20	League Two	36	1	3	0	1	0	3	0	43	1
Port Vale	2020–21	League Two	41	0	1	0	2	0	2	0	46	0
Port Vale	Total		114	1	5	0	3	0	9	0	131	1
AFC Fylde	2021–22	National League North	32	0	0	0	—		2 (Note: Appearances in the FA Trophy)	0	34	0
Radcliffe	2022–23	Northern Premier League; Premier Division	40	1	1	0	—		5 (Note: 1 appearance in the FA Trophy, 1 appearance in the Lancashire FA Challenge Trophy and 3 appearances in the Manchester Premier Cup)	0	46	1
Radcliffe	2023–24	Northern Premier League; Premier Division	17	0	0	0	—		5 (Note: Three appearances in FA Trophy and one appearance in Lancashire FA Challenge Trophy)	0	22	0
Radcliffe	Total		57	1	1	0	0	0	10	0	68	1
Career total			612	17	30	2	16	0	42	0	700	19

== Honours ==
Radcliffe

- Manchester Premier Cup: 2023
