= Brendon Daniels (footballer) =

English footballer (born 1993)

Personal information
- Full name: Brendon George Kofi Nana Osei Mainoo Daniels
- Date of birth: 24 September 1993 (age 33)
- Place of birth: Stoke-on-Trent, England
- Height: 5 ft 11 in (1.80 m)
- Position: Winger

Team information
- Current team: Consett

Youth career
- 2001–2011: Crewe Alexandra

Senior career*
Years	Team	Apps	(Gls)
2011–2013	Crewe Alexandra	7	(0)
2013	→ Chester (loan)	2	(1)
2014	Gateshead (trial)	0	(0)
2014	Chester	3	(0)
2014–2015	Tamworth	29	(7)
2015–2016	Harrogate Town	40	(22)
2016–2017	AFC Fylde	30	(6)
2017–2018	Alfreton Town	36	(13)
2018–2019	Port Vale	0	(0)
2018	→ Altrincham (loan)	7	(0)
2018	→ AFC Telford United (loan)	5	(2)
2019–2023	AFC Telford United	103	(22)
2023–2024	Stourbridge	25	(5)
2024	→ Mickleover (loan)	1	(0)
2024–2025	Leek Town	11	(2)
2025	→ Bradford (Park Avenue) (loan)	16	(3)
2025–	Consett	33	(2)

International career
2016	England C	1	(0)
- * Club domestic league appearances and goals as of 18:56, 26 April 2026 (UTC)

Brendon George Kofi Nana Osei Mainoo Daniels (born 24 September 1993) is an English footballer who plays as a winger for Northern Premier League Division One East club Consett.

Daniels turned professional at Crewe Alexandra in May 2011 but was released after two years with the club and dropped out of the English Football League. He had brief stays with Chester and Gateshead before signing with Tamworth in August 2014. He joined Harrogate Town in June 2015 and went on to be named both the club's Player of the Year and the National League North Team of the Year for the 2015–16 season. He signed with AFC Fylde in May 2016, who had beaten Harrogate in the play-offs, and helped his new club to win promotion as champions of the National League North for the 2016–17 campaign. He remained in the National League North, however, joining Alfreton Town in August 2017 before making a return to the Football League after being signed by Port Vale in May 2018.

He started the 2018–19 season on loan at Altrincham and went on to sign with AFC Telford United in January 2019 following a successful loan spell. He won the club's Player of the Year award for the 2019–20 season. He joined Stourbridge in August 2023 and Leek Town in June 2024. He spent the second half of the 2024–25 season on loan at Bradford (Park Avenue). He joined Consett in August 2025.

== Career ==
=== Crewe Alexandra ===
Born in Stoke-on-Trent, Daniels started his career with Crewe Alexandra at the age of nine before signing a scholarship in 2010. Back with his local school, Haywood High, he formed a strike partnership with Crewe teammate Ryan Colclough and helped Haywood to reach the Sentinel Schools' Shield final at Vale Park in 2010, where they were beaten 3–1 by Alleyne's. In May 2011, he signed his first professional contract after being handed a two-year deal by manager Dario Gradi. He made his professional debut on 11 August 2012, replacing A-Jay Leitch-Smith as a 78th-minute substitute in a 5–0 win over Hartlepool United at the Alexandra Stadium in the League Cup. He made a total of ten appearances for the "Railwaymen" in the first half of the 2012–13 season, though started only two games in League One. On 21 February 2013, he joined Conference North side Chester on a one-month loan. Two days later he scored just 12 minutes into his debut for Neil Young's "Blues" in a 2–0 win over Vauxhall Motors at the Deva Stadium. He played just one further game before returning to Crewe, who released him at the end of his contract in May 2013. Manager Steve Davis had told him he did not feature in his plans due to his lack of experience.

=== Non-League ===
Daniels had a trial with Championship side Blackburn Rovers in October 2013 and scored a brace in a Lancashire Senior Cup win over Rochdale. In January 2014, he went on trial at Gateshead and scored a hat-trick for a Gateshead XI in a Durham Challenge Cup game against Darlington 1883 at the Gateshead International Stadium. Despite this feat "Heed" manager Gary Mills opted not to offer him a contract. On 25 February 2014, Daniels signed for Chester, now of the Conference Premier and managed by Steve Burr, on non-contract terms. He went on to make three league appearances for the "Seals", before he was released at the end of the 2013–14 season.

On 2 August 2014, Brendon joined Tamworth after impressing manager Dale Belford on a trial basis. Speaking in January 2015, after the "Lambs" had won their ninth consecutive Conference North game, Daniels stated that he was happy at The Lamb Ground despite being linked to a number of other clubs. He scored seven goals in 31 appearances across the 2014–15 season as Andy Morrell's side posted a seventh-place finish, missing out on the play-offs by a single point.

On 8 June 2015, he signed with Harrogate Town. He was named as Harrogate's Player of the Year after scoring 23 goals in 43 appearances during the 2015–16 season. This tally included a strike against Grimsby Town in the FA Cup. He was also named on the National League North Team of the Year. His goals helped Simon Weaver's Town to secure a play-off place before they were eliminated at the semi-final stage by AFC Fylde. His form also attracted the attention of the England C selectors, and he made his debut for the "Three Lions" in a 2–0 victory over Ukraine C in March.

On 25 May 2016, Daniels signed a three-year contract at beaten National League North play-off finalists AFC Fylde. Manager Dave Challinor had previously had an approach for Daniels rejected by Harrogate early in the 2015–16 season. Fylde made a switch to full-time training over the summer in what chairman David Haythornthwaite described as "the biggest few months in the history of this club". Daniels scored seven goals in 32 appearances during the 2016–17 season, helping the "Coasters" to achieve their ambition by winning promotion as champions of the National League North.

On 24 August 2017, Daniels joined Alfreton Town on a one-year deal. The "Reds" could only manage a 17th-place finish at the end of the 2017–18 season, though Daniels managed to claim 13 goals from 36 National League North games, finding an upturn in form under new manager Chris Moyses after initially struggling for form at North Street under John McDermott.

=== Port Vale ===
On 17 May 2018, Daniels signed a six-month contract with League Two side Port Vale; manager Neil Aspin said that "he is a local lad who is desperate to prove himself at this level". Daniels himself said that "this is perfect, I couldn't wish to be at a better club. It is my local club... in the last four years I have worked hard and learned my craft and believe I can deliver in League Two". However, manager Neil Aspin said that Daniels reported for pre-season training unfit, and so before the 2018–19 season began Aspin sent Daniels out on loan to newly promoted National League North side Altrincham to gain match fitness. He stayed at Moss Lane for four weeks and made seven appearances for the "Robins". Upon his return to Vale Park he made his first-team debut away in a 2–1 victory at Walsall, coming on as a 65th-minute substitute for Antony Kay in the EFL Trophy group stage game.

=== AFC Telford United ===
On 27 November 2018, he returned to the National League North on loan at AFC Telford United; "Bucks" manager Gavin Cowan said that "he has phenomenal ability and has maybe fallen out of love with the game a little bit, and I want to mentor him". On 26 December, he scored a 30 yards (27 m) free kick in a 3–1 win over Nuneaton Borough at the New Bucks Head. The loan was made into a permanent deal six days later. Cowan stated that he and Daniels had "a little bit of a love-love, love-hate relationship. But it's a good one." He went on to finish the 2018–19 season with five goals in 21 games for Telford. He scored seven goals in 29 games during the 2019–20 campaign – which came to a premature conclusion due to the COVID-19 pandemic in England – and was given the club's away travel and club Player of the Year awards, with Cowan stating that "to say he's matured as a person over his time with us is an understatement". He struggled with a hamstring problem and featured five times in the 2020–21 season, which was curtailed early due to the ongoing pandemic.

Daniels signed a new contract in June 2021. However, recurrent hamstring problems caused him to miss much of the first half of the 2021–22 season and manager Paul Carden was careful not to bring him back too soon. After scoring six goals in nine games since returning to the squad he said he was only 70% fit and would continue to improve. He would lead the club's successful fight against relegation and entered talks for a new contract in the summer. He scored six goals in 35 league games in the 2022–23 campaign as Telford were relegated in last place, and left the club in the summer.

=== Later career ===
On 4 August 2023, Daniels signed with Telford's Southern League Premier Division Central club Stourbridge. He joined Southern League Premier Division Central rivals Mickleover on loan on 5 February 2024. He featured just once for Mickleover and returned to Stourbridge, ending the 2023–24 campaign with six goals in 29 games.

On 26 June 2024, Daniels joined Northern Premier League Premier Division club Leek Town. On 7 February 2025, he joined Bradford (Park Avenue) of the Northern Premier League Division One East on an initial 28-day loan. The loan was later extended until the end of the 2024–25 season.

On 6 August 2025, Daniels joined Northern Premier League Division One East side Consett. He made 35 appearances in the 2025–26 campaign, scoring two goals.

== Style of play ==
Daniels can play on the left wing or as an attacking midfielder. He has good free kick and crossing ability.

== Career statistics ==
As of match played 26 April 2025

Appearances and goals by club, season and competition
Club	Season	League			FA Cup		League Cup		Other		Total	
Club	Season	Division	Apps	Goals	Apps	Goals	Apps	Goals	Apps	Goals	Apps	Goals
Crewe Alexandra	2011–12	League Two	0	0	0	0	0	0	0	0	0	0
Crewe Alexandra	2012–13	League One	7	0	1	0	1	0	1 (Note: Appearance(s) in Football League Trophy / EFL Trophy)	0	10	0
Crewe Alexandra	Total		7	0	1	0	1	0	1	0	10	0
Chester (loan)	2012–13	Conference North	2	1	—		—		0	0	2	1
Gateshead (trial)	2013–14	Conference Premier	0	0	0	0	—		1 (Note: Appearance(s) in Durham Challenge Cup)	3	1	3
Chester	2013–14	Conference Premier	3	0	0	0	—		0	0	3	0
Tamworth	2014–15	Conference North	29	7	2	0	—		0	0	31	7
Harrogate Town	2015–16	National League North	40	22	1	1	—		2 (Note: Appearance(s) in National League North play-offs)	0	43	23
AFC Fylde	2016–17	National League North	30	6	0	0	—		2 (Note: Appearances in FA Trophy)	1	32	7
Alfreton Town	2017–18	National League North	36	13	0	0	—		0	0	36	13
Port Vale	2018–19	League Two	0	0	0	0	0	0	1	0	1	0
Altrincham (loan)	2018–19	National League North	7	0	0	0	—		0	0	7	0
AFC Telford United	2018–19	National League North	16	5	0	0	—		5	0	21	5
AFC Telford United	2019–20	National League North	28	7	0	0	—		1	0	29	7
AFC Telford United	2020–21	National League North	5	1	0	0	—		0	0	5	1
AFC Telford United	2021–22	National League North	24	5	0	0	—		1	0	25	5
AFC Telford United	2022–23	National League North	35	6	0	0	—		1	0	36	6
AFC Telford United	Total		108	24	0	0	—		8	0	116	24
Stourbridge	2023–24	SFL Premier Division Central	25	5	1	0	—		3 (Note: Two appearances and one goal in FA Trophy, one appearance in Birmingham Senior Cup)	1	29	6
Mickleover (loan)	2023–24	SFL Premier Division Central	1	0	—		—		0	0	1	0
Leek Town	2024–25	NPL Premier Division	11	2	2	0	—		1 (Note: Appearances in Staffordshire Senior Cup)	0	14	2
Bradford (Park Avenue)	2024–25	NPL East Division	16	3	—		—		0	0	16	3
Consett	2025–26	NPL East Division	33	2	0	0	—		2	0	35	2
Consett	2026–27	NPL East Division	0	0	0	0	—		0	0	0	0
Consett	Total		33	2	0	0	0	0	2	0	35	2
Career total			348	85	7	1	1	0	21	5	377	91

== Honours ==
Individual

- Harrogate Town Player of the Year: 2015–16
- National League North Team of the Year: 2015–16
- AFC Telford United Player of the Year: 2019–20

AFC Fylde

- National League North: 2016–17
