= Manny Oyeleke =

English footballer

Personal information
- Full name: Emmanuel Oyedele Oluwaseun Opeoluwa Akan Oyeleke
- Date of birth: 24 December 1992 (age 33)
- Place of birth: Wandsworth, England
- Height: 5 ft 9 in (1.75 m)
- Positions: Central midfielder; right back

Youth career
- 2002–2008: Chelsea
- 2008–2009: Queens Park Rangers
- 2009–2010: FootballCV Academy
- 2010–2012: Brentford

Senior career*
Years	Team	Apps	(Gls)
2011–2015	Brentford	1	(0)
2013	→ Northampton Town (loan)	2	(0)
2013–2014	→ Aldershot Town (loan)	28	(3)
2014	→ Aldershot Town (loan)	7	(2)
2014–2015	→ Aldershot Town (loan)	8	(0)
2015	→ Woking (loan)	5	(0)
2015–2016	Exeter City	8	(0)
2017–2018	Aldershot Town	44	(3)
2017	→ Canvey Island (loan)	6	(1)
2018–2021	Port Vale	54	(5)
2021–2023	Chesterfield	36	(2)
2023–2024	Woking	14	(0)
2024	Farnborough	15	(0)
Total		228	(16)
- * Club domestic league appearances and goals

Emmanuel Oyedele Oluwaseun Opeoluwa Akan Oyeleke (born 24 December 1992) is an English former professional footballer who played as a central midfielder or right back.

A product of the Brentford youth system, Oyeleke spent much of his senior years with the club away on loan, before joining Exeter City in May 2015. He was released after a disappointing 2015–16 season after recovering from a long-term injury, he returned to Aldershot Town in February 2017, a club for whom he had previously played on loan. He rose to prominence during the 2017–18 season and returned to the EFL to join Port Vale in June 2018. He spent nearly three seasons struggling with injuries at Vale before returning to the National League with Chesterfield in April 2021. He joined Woking for the 2023–24 season before moving to Farnborough, where he announced his retirement in December 2024.

== Career ==
=== Early years ===
Oyeleke was born in Wandsworth, London and is of Nigerian descent. He began his career at Premier League side Chelsea, playing in the youth teams from U9 to U14 level. He moved to Queens Park Rangers and played for two seasons at U15 and U16 level. Oyeleke moved to the FootballCV Academy in 2009. During the 2009–10 season, he made appearances for the academy in the Conference Youth Alliance, the Central Conference Reserve League, the Northamptonshire U18s Cup and the FA Youth Cup. He scored in the Central Conference Reserve Cup final versus Halesowen Town on 27 April 2010, levelling the score at 1–1 and helping the academy to a 3–2 shootout victory. While at the academy, Oyeleke had trials with Premier League side Stoke City and Championship sides Burnley and Derby County.

=== Brentford ===
Oyeleke signed for League One club Brentford in May 2010 on a two-year scholarship. His maiden call-up to the first-team squad came in the last game of the 2010–11 season, when he was an unused substitute during a 4–4 league draw at Huddersfield Town. Oyeleke made his Brentford debut in a 1–0 FA Cup second round defeat to Wrexham on 3 December 2011, when he came on at half-time as a substitute for Myles Weston. He made his league debut and first start for the club on 31 December, in a 3–3 draw with Milton Keynes Dons at Griffin Park. Brentford conceded three goals in the first half and as a result, Oyeleke was substituted at half-time. Speaking after the game, manager Uwe Rösler said that it had been a mistake to play Oyeleke, due to the intensity of the battle in midfield. He was not called into the first-team squad again during the 2011–12 season. Oyeleke signed his first professional contract in April 2012, a two-year deal to be a part of the development squad. Oyeleke was an unused substitute on 9 occasions for the first-team during the 2012–13 season and failed to make an appearance, though he made regular appearances for the development squad and furthered his development by gaining experience playing as a right-back.

On 6 August 2013, Oyeleke made his first competitive appearance for the club in nearly 20 months in a 3–2 extra time League Cup victory over Dagenham & Redbridge. He started the match and played 54 minutes, before being substituted for Farid El Alagui. He spent much of the 2013–14 season away on loan. He made seven appearances and scored one goal for the development squad.

It was announced on 27 June 2014 that despite being overage, Oyeleke had signed a new one-year deal to remain part of the development squad after impressing on loan away from Griffin Park during the 2013–14 season. Oyeleke made 11 development squad appearances, scoring once, during the 2014–15 season and was released by manager Mark Warburton at the end of the campaign, having made just three first-team appearances for the Bees.

==== Northampton Town (loan) ====
Over a year since his previous first-team match, Oyeleke joined League Two promotion challengers Northampton Town on a one-month loan on 28 January 2013. His first appearance for the Cobblers came on 2 February against Rotherham United, starting in a 3–1 away defeat and being substituted at half-time for Roy O'Donovan. Oyeleke returned to Griffin Park on 26 February, when his loan at Sixfields expired, having made just two appearances.

==== Aldershot Town (loans) ====
On 9 August 2013, Oyeleke joined Conference Premier side Aldershot Town on loan until 22 December. He made his debut for the club the following day, coming on as a first-half substitute for Adam Mekki in a 1–1 draw at Grimsby Town. In the following game, he scored the first competitive goal of his career in a 3–0 victory at home to Dartford. He followed up with two more goals and after scoring his fourth goal in a 6–0 rout of Tamworth on 21 December, his loan was extended until 28 January 2014. He made 33 appearances and scored four goals during his spell.

On 27 March 2014, Oyeleke returned to the Shots for his second loan spell of 2013–14 and agreed a deal to stay until the end of the season. He scored the first goal of his second spell in a vital 4–1 win over play-off challengers Alfreton Town on 8 April, with "a neat finish" from close range. Oyeleke scored on the final day of the season in a 2–1 defeat to Hereford United, with other results going the Shots' way to securing their position in the Conference Premier for the 2014–15 season with a 19th-place finish. Oyeleke made 40 appearances across his two spells with Aldershot during the 2013–14 season, scoring six goals. On 16 October 2014, Oyeleke rejoined Aldershot Town on a loan running until 13 January 2015. A leg injury hindered his chance of regular appearances and he made 11 appearances before returning to Brentford when his loan expired.

==== Woking (loan) ====
On 26 March 2015, Oyeleke joined Conference Premier side Woking on a one-month loan. He made his debut as a late substitute for Kevin Betsy in a 2–2 draw with Welling United at the Kingfield Stadium on 4 April. Oyeleke's spell came to an end after the final game of the season, his fifth appearance, after Garry Hill's Cards failed to qualify for the play-offs.

=== Exeter City ===
On 7 May 2015, Oyeleke signed for League Two side Exeter City. He made 11 appearances for the Grecians during the 2015–16 season and scored one goal, versus Premier League club Sunderland in the first round of the League Cup in the early weeks of the season. He was released at the end of the season. He signed with a new club but tore his Anterior cruciate ligament and the new club refused to ratify the contract.

=== Return to Aldershot Town ===
After recovering from a long-term injury, Oyeleke rejoined National League club Aldershot Town on 13 February 2017, on a contract running until the end of the 2016–17 season. After a month away on loan and recovering from a hamstring injury, he made his third debut for the club as a substitute for Jim Kellerman after 70 minutes of a 2–0 victory over Solihull Moors on 1 April and signed a new one-year contract at the end of the month. He finished the season with six appearances after the Shots fell to Tranmere Rovers in the National League play-offs. Despite enduring a second play-off defeat, Oyeleke had a successful 2017–18 season, making 44 appearances, scoring three goals and being voted the club's Supporters' and Players' Player of the Year. On 21 May 2018, he refused to sign a new contract and left the club. Across his three spells with Aldershot Town, Oyeleke made 101 appearances and scored eight goals.

==== Canvey Town (loan) ====
Immediately after arriving at Aldershot Town on 13 February 2017, Oyeleke was loaned to Isthmian League Premier Division club Canvey Island for one month to gain match fitness. He scored one goal during his six appearances and suffered a hamstring injury during the final match of his loan.

=== Port Vale ===
On 1 June 2018, Oyeleke returned to the EFL by signing a one-year contract with League Two club Port Vale. After recovering from an injury picked up in pre-season, he started the 2018–19 season in a central midfield partnership with Luke Joyce. On 15 September, he scored his first goal for the "Valiants" in a 2–0 victory over Northampton Town at Vale Park, which was later selected as the League Two goal of the weekend; in addition to this he was also named on the EFL team of the week. However, he picked up a hamstring injury at the start of the following month. He was ruled out of action for a few weeks. A calf injury in April saw him sidelined for the rest of the 2018–19 season, leaving manager John Askey to comment that "I think all season Manny has struggled to get right. Going into pre-season he was injured and then he had to start playing to get his fitness. That has affected him this season.... but we all know that Manny will be missed because he had shown his ability. He has looked a good player." He signed a new two-year deal in June 2019.

He picked up a hamstring injury two games into the 2019–20 season and was initially ruled out of action for four weeks, though his recovery was slow and he was sent to St George's Park National Football Centre after five weeks in order to better aid his recovery. He made his first start in seven weeks on 28 September, however, lasted just ten minutes before making a grade three tear in his hamstring and facing another extended lay off. He underwent surgery on his hamstring in October and returned to fitness in February. He made only three starts before the season was ended early due to the COVID-19 pandemic in England.

Oyeleke was again injured early in the 2020–21 campaign but returned to fitness in time to replace the suspended Luke Joyce in November. He returned to fitness towards the end of the campaign and manager Darrell Clarke said that "he looks like he is getting better with games".

=== Chesterfield ===
On 13 April 2021, Oyeleke dropped back down to the National League to sign for play-off chasing Chesterfield for an undisclosed fee, linking up with his new manager James Rowe, who was his assistant manager when Oyeleke was at Aldershot. He played 12 league games in what remained of the 2020–21 season, helping the "Spireites" to qualify for the play-offs. Chesterfield were beaten by Notts County at the quarter-final stage. A recurring calf injury restricted him to 28 appearances in the 2021–22 campaign and he did not feature under Paul Cook in the play-offs. He was absent throughout the 2022–23 season as he underwent surgery on his knee and suffered setbacks in his recovery. His departure from the club was confirmed in May 2023.

=== Woking ===
On 19 July 2023, Oyeleke joined National League side Woking on a one-year deal; manager Darren Sarll said that "Emmanuel and I have quite an extensive history and he is an individual I know as well as any person I currently work with". He played 15 games in the 2023–24 season and was not retained beyond the summer.

=== Farnborough ===
On 4 June 2024, Oyeleke joined National League South club Farnborough as manager Spencer Day's first signing of the summer. He played 17 games in the first half of the 2024–25 season and then announced his retirement from football on 28 December 2024.

== Style of play ==
Able to play as a central midfielder or at right back, Oyeleke has described himself as "quite dynamic, strong, good on the ball and a team player". Aldershot Town director Tommy Anderson stated that Oyeleke is "a very solid box-to-box midfielder... very good at protecting the defence but also very good at going forward as well" and "a very good ball player, he is someone who looks to dictate play, he loves to control the midfield. He is very versatile through the middle, he can be the water carrier or the attacking midfielder".

== Personal life ==
Oyeleke's partner gave birth to a baby daughter on 31 December 2020. In summer 2020, he co-hosted a podcast with The Athletic's Richard Amofa called Beyond The Athlete, which focused on interviewing sportsmen and women who have transitioned into other businesses and professions. He started writing a weekly blog, Living the Dream, in 2022.

== Career statistics ==
Appearances and goals by club, season and competition
Club	Season	League			FA Cup		League Cup		Other		Total	
Club	Season	Division	Apps	Goals	Apps	Goals	Apps	Goals	Apps	Goals	Apps	Goals
Brentford	2011–12	League One	1	0	1	0	0	0	0	0	2	0
Brentford	2012–13	League One	0	0	0	0	0	0	0	0	0	0
Brentford	2013–14	League One	0	0	0	0	1	0	0	0	1	0
Brentford	Total		1	0	1	0	1	0	0	0	3	0
Northampton Town (loan)	2012–13	League Two	2	0	—		—		—		2	0
Aldershot Town (loan)	2013–14	Conference Premier	35	5	2	0	—		3 (Note: Appearances in FA Trophy)	1	40	6
Aldershot Town (loan)	2014–15	Conference Premier	8	0	2	0	—		1	0	11	0
Woking (loan)	2014–15	Conference Premier	5	0	—		—		—		5	0
Exeter City	2015–16	League Two	8	0	1	0	1	1	1	0	11	1
Aldershot Town	2016–17	National League	4	0	—		—		2 (Note: Appearances in National League play-offs.)	0	6	0
Aldershot Town	2017–18	National League	40	3	2	0	—		2 (Note: 1 appearance in National League play-offs, 1 appearance in FA Trophy.)	0	44	3
Aldershot Town	Aldershot Town total		87	8	6	0	—		8	1	101	9
Canvey Island (loan)	2016–17	Isthmian League; Premier Division	6	1	—		—		—		6	1
Port Vale	2018–19	League Two	28	3	1	0	1	0	3 (Note: Appearances in EFL Trophy)	0	33	3
Port Vale	2019–20	League Two	6	0	0	0	0	0	1	0	7	0
Port Vale	2020–21	League Two	20	2	0	0	1	0	2	0	23	2
Port Vale	Total		54	5	1	0	2	0	6	0	63	5
Chesterfield	2020–21	National League	12	0	—		—		1 (Note: Appearances in play-offs)	0	13	0
Chesterfield	2021–22	National League	24	2	4	0	—		0	0	28	2
Chesterfield	2022–23	National League	0	0	0	0	—		0	0	0	0
Chesterfield	Total		36	2	4	0	0	0	1	0	41	2
Woking	2023–24	National League	14	0	0	0	—		1	0	15	0
Farnborough	2024–25	National League South	15	0	1	0	—		1	0	17	0
Career total			228	16	12	0	4	1	20	2	264	19

== Honours ==
Individual

- Aldershot Town Supporters' Player of the Year: 2017–18
- Aldershot Town Players' Player of the Year: 2017–18
