= Nelson Agho =

English footballer

Personal information
- Date of birth: 24 February 2003 (age 23)
- Place of birth: Valencia, Spain
- Height: 1.83 m (6 ft 0 in)
- Position: Forward

Youth career
- Port Vale

Senior career*
Years	Team	Apps	(Gls)
2018–2022	Port Vale	0	(0)
- * Club domestic league appearances and goals

Nelson Agho (born 24 February 2003) is a Spanish former footballer who played as a forward. He made his competitive first-team debut for Port Vale on 13 November 2018 at the age of 15 years and 262 days, making him the youngest player in the club's history. However, due to unfortunate injuries throughout his youth development years he left the club four years later without making another appearance.

== Career ==
Agho moved from Valencia to England at the age of 11 and went on to join the Port Vale Academy. He made his first-team debut for the "Valiants" on 13 November 2018, coming on as an 83rd-minute substitute for Idris Kanu in a 2–1 win over Walsall at the Bescot Stadium in an EFL Trophy group stage game; aged just 15 years and 262 days, this made him the youngest player in the club's history until Jack Shorrock broke this record four years later. In the final season of his youth team contract, 2020–21, he picked up a cruciate knee injury and missed three months after undergoing an operation, so the club secured EFL permission for an extension to his youth contract so that he had an extra year to try and win a professional deal. He was not offered a professional contract when his youth team contract expired in June 2022. He had a trial at Matlock Town that was ended when he broke his ankle in a friendly game.

== Style of play ==
Speaking in November 2018, Port Vale youth team manager Mick Ede said that "[Agho] is strong, he is quick and he has an eye for goal".

== Career statistics ==
Appearances and goals by club, season and competition
Club	Season	League			FA Cup		EFL Cup		Other		Total	
Club	Season	Division	Apps	Goals	Apps	Goals	Apps	Goals	Apps	Goals	Apps	Goals
Port Vale	2018–19	League Two	0	0	0	0	0	0	1 (Note: Appearance(s) in the Football League Trophy)	0	1	0
Port Vale	2019–20	League Two	0	0	0	0	0	0	0	0	0	0
Port Vale	2020–21	League Two	0	0	0	0	0	0	0	0	0	0
Port Vale	2021–22	League Two	0	0	0	0	0	0	0	0	0	0
Port Vale	Total		0	0	0	0	0	0	1	0	1	0
Career total			0	0	0	0	0	0	1	0	1	0
