= Toby Edser =

English footballer

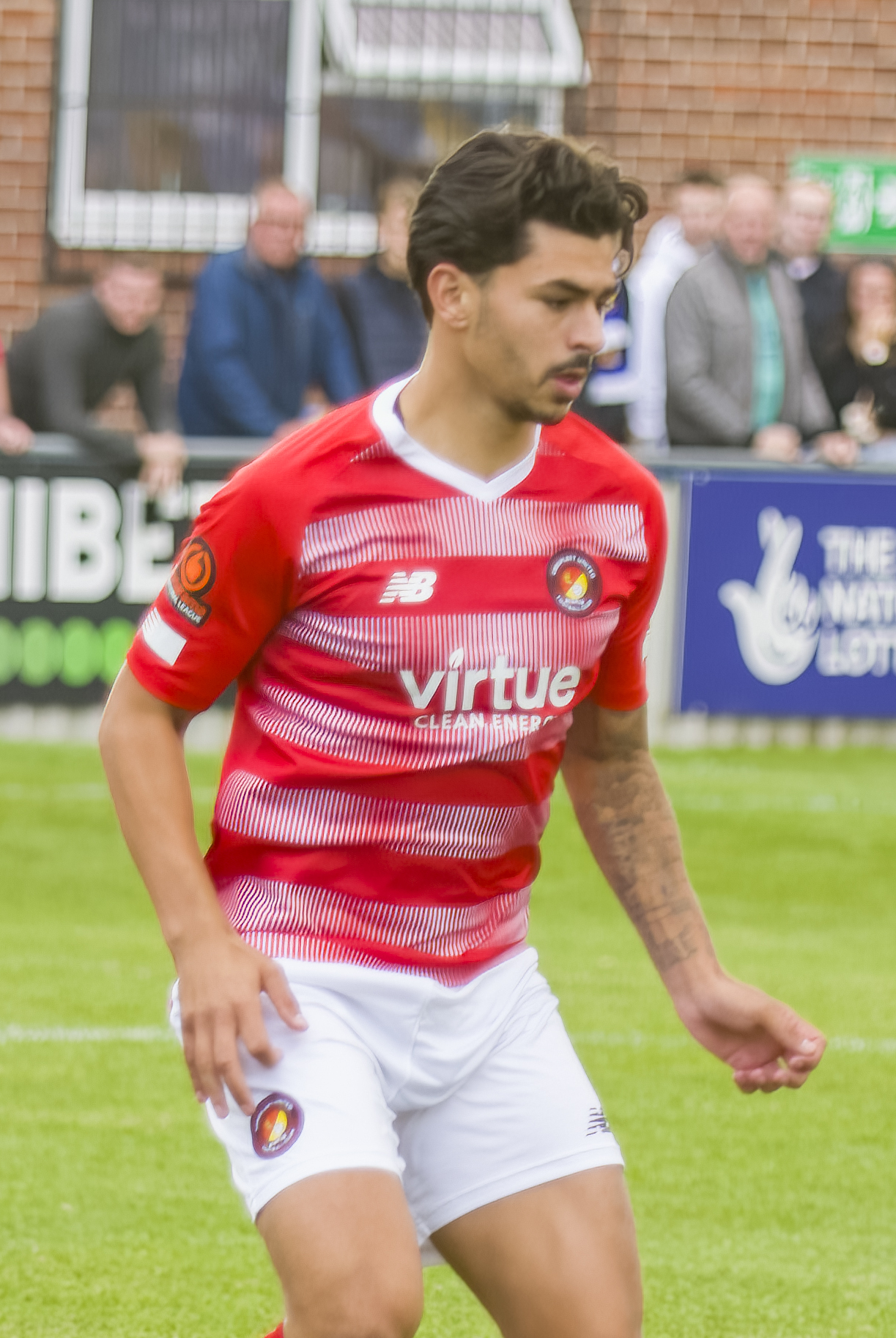
- Toby Edser playing for Ebbsfleet United in 2022

Personal information
- Full name: Toby George Edser
- Date of birth: 28 February 1999 (age 27)
- Place of birth: Guildford, England
- Height: 1.74 m (5 ft 9 in)
- Position: Midfielder

Team information
- Current team: Ebbsfleet United
- Number: 8

Youth career
- Guildford Saints
- 2007–2014: Fulham
- 2014–2015: Charlton Athletic
- 2015–2018: Nottingham Forest

Senior career*
| Years | Team | Apps | (Gls) |
| 2018–2020 | Nottingham Forest | 0 | (0) |
| 2018 | → Woking (loan) | 11 | (2) |
| 2019 | → Port Vale (loan) | 0 | (0) |
| 2019 | → Woking (loan) | 13 | (1) |
| 2020–2022 | Aldershot Town | 62 | (5) |
| 2022– | Ebbsfleet United | 159 | (16) |

International career
| 2024 | England C | 1 | (0) |
- * Club domestic league appearances and goals as of 19:06, 26 April 2026 (UTC)

Toby George Edser (born 28 February 1999) is an English professional footballer who plays as a midfielder for National League South club Ebbsfleet United. He has been capped by the England C team.

Edser began his senior career at Nottingham Forest and spent time on loan at Woking and Port Vale. He never played a first-team game with Nottingham Forest and joined Aldershot Town after being released in June 2020. He joined Ebbsfleet United after two seasons with Aldershot and helped Ebbsfleet to win the National League South title at the end of the 2022–23 season.

== Early and personal life ==
Edser is from Burpham and attended George Abbot School.

== Club career ==
=== Nottingham Forest ===
Edser was spotted by Fulham playing for the Guildford Saints as an eight-year-old and was signed to the club's Academy until his release at age 15. He was then an associated schoolboy at Charlton Athletic before he signed a two-year scholarship at Nottingham Forest in 2015. He helped Forest's under-18 team to win their league and reach the fifth round of the FA Youth Cup during the 2015–16 season. He went on to captain the under-23 side the following season and was an unused substitute for the first-team in the Championship, first appearing on the bench at the City Ground in October 2016; it was reported that he was expected to have made his senior debut had Mark Warburton's side not taken until the final day of the season to secure safety from relegation. He went on to sign a new three-year contract, but found breaking into the first-team more difficult during the 2017–18 season due to an influx of midfielders signed in the summer.

On 19 October 2018, he joined National League South side Woking on a one-month loan deal. He made his debut for the "Cardinals" at the Kingfield Stadium the next day, helping his new team to beat Welling United 1–0 in the fourth qualification round of the FA Cup. After his loan was extended he scored his first goal for the club on 24 November, in a 2–0 victory over Folkestone Invicta in the third qualification round of the FA Trophy to secure the "Cards" a place in the first round proper of the competition. Woking went on to cause a cup upset in the second round proper of the FA Cup, knocking out League Two side Swindon Town at the County Ground. He scored a total of four goals in 19 appearances for Alan Dowson's Woking. On 31 January 2019, he joined League Two club Port Vale on loan until the end of the 2018–19 season.

He returned on loan to Woking in August 2019, who were now playing in the National League. He later said he regretted leaving Woking after his first spell. He was released by Nottingham Forest at the end of the 2019–20 season.

=== Aldershot Town ===
On 18 September 2020, Edser signed with National League side Aldershot Town and said, "I'm really happy; it's been a bit stressful over the last few months". He scored four goals in 43 league appearances in the 2020–21 season and was re-signed for another year. However, he missed two months of the 2021–22 campaign with injury, marking his return to fitness in January with a goal in a 1–1 draw with Maidenhead United at the Recreation Ground.

=== Ebbsfleet United ===
In July 2022, he signed for National League South side Ebbsfleet United following a trial. He scored twelve goals from 47 appearances in the 2022–23 season, including a hat-trick in a final day 5–0 win over Hungerford Town at Stonebridge Road. Ebbsfleet won the National League South title, setting a club record of 32 wins and 109 goals. He then featured 39 times in the 2023–24 season. He played 37 league games in the 2024–25 campaign as Ebbsfleet were relegated with seven games left to play.

He scored a brace against Ashford Town in the FA Cup, his first goals in 18 months, after making a target of scoring more goals in the 2025–26 campaign. Manager Josh Wright added that "he needs to shoot more, he needs more goals". He went on to score four goals in 42 league games in the 2025–26 campaign.

== International career ==
Edser was called up to the England C team in April 2024. Manager Paul Fairclough started him in the following month's 2–0 win over Nepal.

== Style of play ==
Edser has been described by the Port Vale club website as "a talented playmaker with a strong technical ability". The Nottingham Forest club website stated that "his intelligence on the ball allows him to dictate play wherever he is on the field". He has described himself as "quite a leader on the pitch".

== Career statistics ==
As of match played 25 April 2026

Appearances and goals by club, season and competition
| Club | Season | League | | | FA Cup | | Other | | Total | |
| Club | Season | Division | Apps | Goals | Apps | Goals | Apps | Goals | Apps | Goals |
|---|---|---|---|---|---|---|---|---|---|---|
| Nottingham Forest | 2018–19 | Championship | 0 | 0 | 0 | 0 | 0 | 0 | 0 | 0 |
| Woking (loan) | 2018–19 | National League South | 11 | 2 | 4 | 0 | 4 (Note: Appearance(s) in the FA Trophy and the Surrey Senior Cup.) | 2 | 19 | 4 |
| Port Vale (loan) | 2018–19 | League Two | 0 | 0 | 0 | 0 | 0 | 0 | 0 | 0 |
| Woking (loan) | 2019–20 | National League | 13 | 1 | 1 | 0 | 0 | 0 | 14 | 1 |
| Aldershot Town | 2020–21 | National League | 43 | 3 | 1 | 0 | 3 (Note: Appearance(s) in the FA Trophy.) | 1 | 47 | 4 |
| Aldershot Town | 2021–22 | National League | 19 | 2 | 1 | 0 | 1 | 0 | 21 | 2 |
| Aldershot Town | 2022–23 | National League | 0 | 0 | 0 | 0 | 0 | 0 | 0 | 0 |
| Aldershot Town | Total | | 62 | 5 | 2 | 0 | 4 | 1 | 68 | 6 |
| Ebbsfleet United | 2022–23 | National League South | 43 | 11 | 3 | 1 | 1 | 0 | 47 | 12 |
| Ebbsfleet United | 2023–24 | National League | 37 | 1 | 1 | 0 | 1 | 0 | 39 | 1 |
| Ebbsfleet United | 2024–25 | National League | 37 | 0 | 0 | 0 | 1 | 0 | 38 | 0 |
| Ebbsfleet United | 2025–26 | National League South | 42 | 4 | 0 | 0 | 0 | 0 | 42 | 4 |
| Ebbsfleet United | 2026–27 | National League South | 0 | 0 | 0 | 0 | 0 | 0 | 0 | 0 |
| Ebbsfleet United | Total | | 159 | 16 | 4 | 1 | 3 | 0 | 166 | 17 |
| Career total | | | 245 | 24 | 11 | 1 | 11 | 3 | 267 | 28 |

== Honours ==
Ebbsfleet United

- National League South: 2022–23
