= 2021–22 Port Vale F.C. season =

Port Vale
2021–22 season
- Owner: Synsol Holdings Limited
- Chair: Carol Shanahan
- Manager: Darrell Clarke (until 15 February); Andy Crosby (acting manager 15 February – 6 May); Darrell Clarke (from 6 May)
- Stadium: Vale Park
- League Two: 5th (78 points) play-off winners
- FA Cup: Third Round (eliminated by Brentford)
- EFL Cup: First Round (eliminated by Sunderland)
- EFL Trophy: Second Round (eliminated by Rotherham United)
- Player of the Year: Ben Garrity
- Top goalscorer: League: Ben Garrity, Jamie Proctor (12); All: James Wilson (15)
- Highest home attendance: 11,669 vs. Swindon Town, 19 May 2022
- Lowest home attendance: 1,727 vs. Rochdale, 5 October 2021
- Average home league attendance: 6,103
- Biggest win: 5–0 vs. Liverpool U21, 9 November 2021
- Biggest defeat: 1–4 vs. Brentford, 8 January 2022
Home colours	Away colours	Third colours

The 2021–22 season was Port Vale's 110th season in the English Football League and fifth consecutive season in EFL League Two. It was manager Darrell Clarke's first full season in charge of the club.

Clarke oversaw a complete overhaul of the playing squad, releasing 15 out-of-contract players and placing a further three contracted players on the transfer-list, whilst making 11 permanent signings and three loan signings. His new side got off to an indifferent start, winning one but losing just one of their opening five league games whilst exiting the EFL Cup in the first round. Three wins and one loss took them into the play-offs by the end of September and earned Clarke a Manager of the Month award. They took 13 out of a possible 18 points in October to establish themselves in second place and win Clarke a second-successive Manager of the Month award. However, injuries to joint top-scorers Jamie Proctor and James Wilson took their toll the following month as Vale dropped to fifth and exited the EFL Trophy at the second round. Victories over League One sides Accrington Stanley and Burton Albion took Vale into the third round of the FA Cup.

Following an enforced five-week break from the league, Vale's promotion push faltered with only four points gained from four January fixtures, whilst they were beaten by Premier League side Brentford in the FA Cup third round. The recruitment team were extremely busy, however, as eight players were signed and nine departed (including three loans cancelled early) to combat an ever-worsening injury crisis. Despite Clarke entering a period of bereavement leave, with assistant manager Andy Crosby left in charge of first-team affairs, the team ended February on an eight-match unbeaten run – though five of these games ended in draws. After a poor start to March with one point gained from two games, Vale went on to gain 28 points from a possible 30 to leave themselves in third place in mid-April. Three straight defeats saw them drop into the play-offs, and Darrell Clarke returned to take charge for the final league game of the season. They defeated Swindon Town in the play-off semi-finals through a penalty shoot-out in dramatic circumstances. Promotion was secured at Wembley Stadium with a 3–0 victory over Mansfield Town in the final.

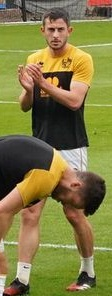
Player of the Year Ben Garrity.

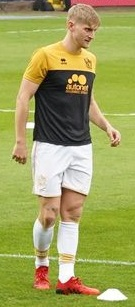
Nathan Smith played 53 of the club's 57 games.

Top-scorer James Wilson.

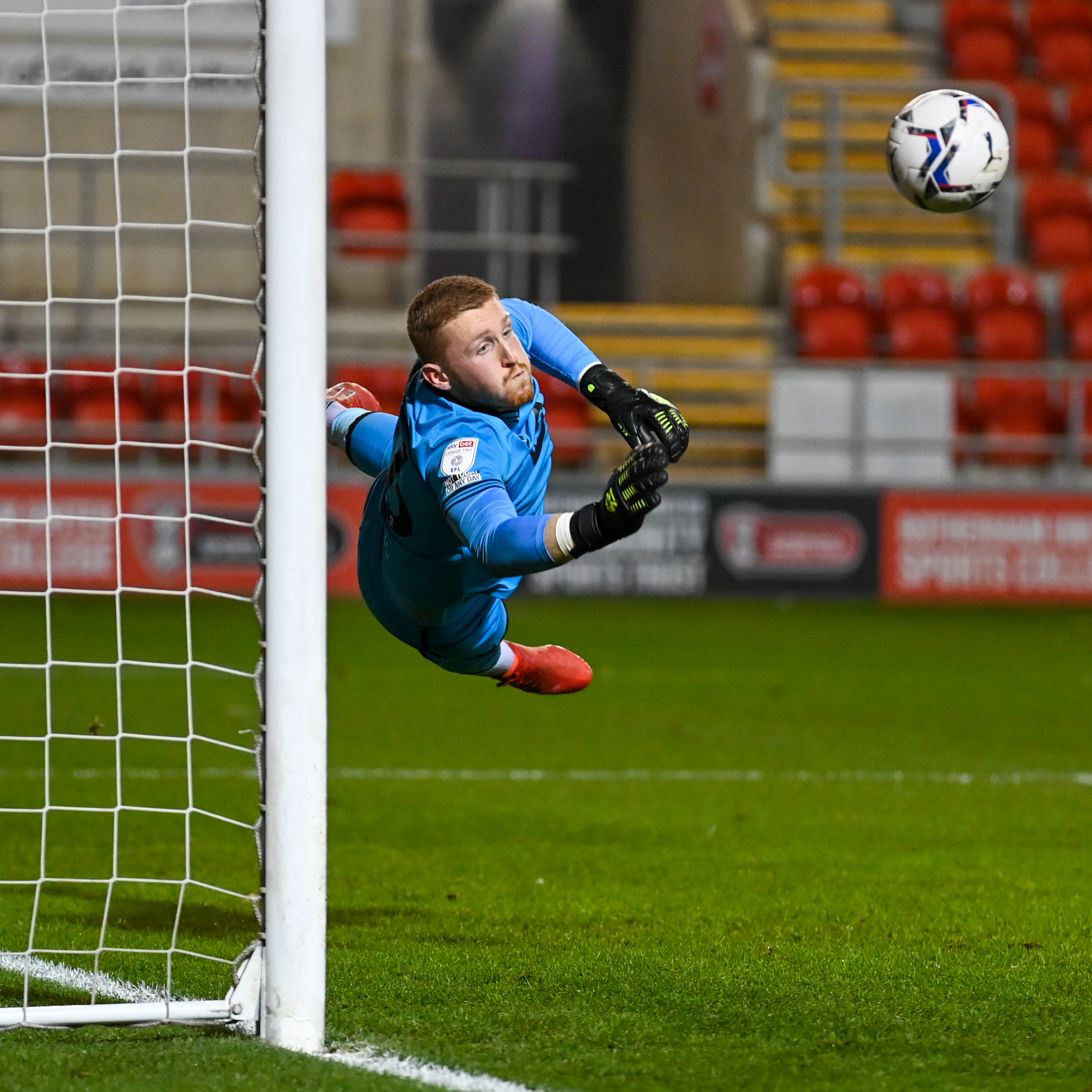
Young Player of the Year Aidan Stone.

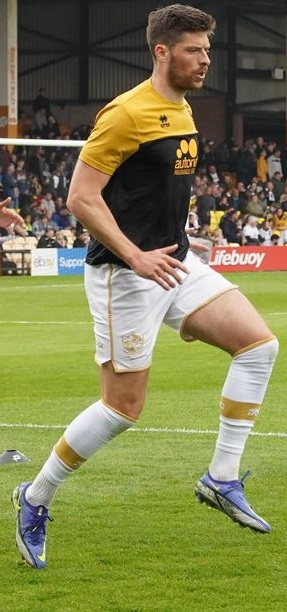
Jamie Proctor scored the goal of the season.

Mal Benning scored in the play-off final.

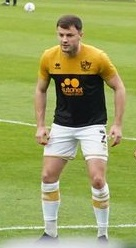
James Gibbons featured 32 times.

== Overview ==
=== EFL League Two ===
Manager Darrell Clarke had to completely rebuild the playing squad after he released all 15 out-of-contract players following the club's mid-table finish at the end of the 2020–21 season: Shaun Brisley, Scott Brown, Ryan Campbell-Gordon, Adam Crookes, Mark Cullen, David Fitzpatrick, Kurtis Guthrie, Luke Joyce, Harry McKirdy, Zak Mills, Cristian Montaño, Tom Pope, Tom Scott, Daniel Trickett-Smith and Dino Visser. He also transfer-listed Theo Robinson, Danny Whitehead and Scott Burgess. Clarke's first signing as manager was Brad Walker, a defensive ball playing central midfielder who had been released from League One club Shrewsbury Town. He then paid Blackpool an undisclosed fee for central midfielder Ben Garrity, who he described as "young, hungry and ambitious". Biddulph-born James Wilson was then signed upon his release from Salford City, a 25-year-old striker who had come through Manchester United as a highly rated teenager. The club also confirmed that Andy Crosby would be staying on at the club as assistant manager, which director of football David Flitcroft said was "a really important signing" due to his "outstanding coaching, organisational skills, knowledge, work ethic and enthusiasm". Aaron Martin, a 31-year-old centre-back who had previously worked with Crosby at Southampton, then joined on a two-year deal. Another former Salford City player, left-back Dan Jones, then joined on a two-year deal. Taking Brown's place in goal was 30-year-old Brazilian Lucas Covolan, who had been on the losing side of the National League play-off final despite scoring a stoppage-time equaliser for Torquay United. Aidan Stone, a 21-year-old goalkeeper released from Mansfield Town, also joined the club. Defender Ryan Johnson was added after he rejected a contract from newly-promoted Hartlepool United. Two more players were announced on 28 June: long-time Stevenage central midfielder Tom Pett and six-year Mansfield Town veteran full-back Mal Benning. The next arrival was 29-year-old former Rotherham United striker Jamie Proctor, who signed a one-year deal. Lewis Cass, a 21-year-old defender from Newcastle United then joined on a season-long loan.

Port Vale lost 1–0 in their opening day fixture away at Northampton Town and had Covolan sent off on his competitive debut. The first point was picked up seven days later in an entertaining goalless draw with Tranmere Rovers at Vale Park. Clarke then added Romanian wide midfielder Dennis Politic to the squad, who arrived on loan from Bolton Wanderers. Carlisle United visited Vale Park on 17 August and left with a point after another 0–0 draw. A third consecutive draw followed with a 1–1 stalemate at Stevenage, causing Clarke to condemn his side's "atrocious" first half performance. Vale achieved their first victory of the season with a 2–0 win a league leaders Forest Green Rovers, Proctor scoring both goals within the opening nine minutes. As the transfer window drew to a close, Clarke brought in striker George Lloyd on a season-long loan from Cheltenham Town. Meanwhile, Theo Robinson left the club to join divisional rivals Bradford City.

With Leon Legge out injured, Clarke signed free agent defender Danny Amos on a short-term deal to provide defensive cover. Proctor scored another brace at home to Rochdale, though defensive errors cost Vale a 3–2 defeat; captain Tom Conlon, returning from injury, said that "we started really well and then they have equalised and it has knocked the stuffing out of us". They picked up their second away win of the season at Swindon Town, with Garrity scoring both the side's goals in a 2–1 victory; after the game Clarke thanked the away support but urged critics to "not make scapegoats of any of our players". The first home win of the season came against Harrogate Town on 18 September, with David Worrall and James Wilson providing the goals that moved the Vale into the play-offs. A third straight win followed at struggling Scunthorpe United, where Garrity would score the game's only goal. Clarke was nominated for Manager of the Month and Garrity was nominated for Player of the Month; Clarke won the award, the second of his career.

Hosting second-placed Leyton Orient on 2 October, Port Vale took an early lead but went 2–1 behind on 86 minutes when Tom James – on the pitch despite having been reported as suspended for having received five yellow cards this season – scored a late goal; however, substitute Politic scored an equalising stoppage-time goal on his long-awaited debut and Proctor then scored a winner two minutes later. The victory was marred however, by racist abuse that had been sent over Instagram to opposition goalkeeper Lawrence Vigouroux by Port Vale supporters. The situation was reversed away at Sutton United as the Vale lost 4–3 despite leading 3–2 with four minutes of regular time remaining; Clarke was philosophical after the match, saying "you have to take your medicine. Last week we were joyous because we got injury-time goals, this week we are on the floor. But we will respond." They went one goal down at home to Barrow but then responded with three second-half goals to move back into third place. Vale took the lead against struggling Mansfield Town with a Conlon strike, but ended up drawing the game 1–1. On 23 October, the Vale eased to a 3–0 home win over Colchester United, with James Gibbons, James Wilson and substitute Aaron Martin sharing the goals. They found themselves a goal down at half-time at Crawley Town. Still, they came back to win 4–1, with the home side reduced to ten men. Clarke won a second-successive Manager of the Month award, becoming the first Port Vale boss to win the award two months running.

On 13 November, Vale played out a 1–1 draw with Bradford City in front of the SKY TV cameras at Vale Park as the Premier League and Championship were on an international break. However, with Proctor and now Wilson out with injuries, Vale's form stuttered with a 3–2 defeat at relegation threatened Oldham Athletic. Clarke's former club Walsall then eased to a 1–0 win at Vale Park, much to his chagrin as he stated that he was "embarrassed... [and] I won't accept that sort of performance – ever". Despite mounting injuries – including long-term absences for joint top-scorers Proctor and Wilson – they returned to winning ways with a 2–0 home victory over a poor Hartlepool United side.

Vale returned to the automatic promotion places with a 2–1 win at Clarke's former club Bristol Rovers on 7 December, with the undisciplined hosts going down to nine men after having two players sent off; the negative for Vale though was that Rodney hurt his ankle to leave all five of the club's forwards out injured. Without a recognised striker, Vale went to Newport County four days later and took the lead through makeshift striker Garrity, only to lose the game 2–1 with ten men after Jones was shown a late red card. This would prove the last match of the calendar year as three games were postponed over the Christmas holidays due to injury and illness – mainly thanks to the ongoing COVID-19 pandemic in England.

Clarke attempted to address the injury crisis in the forward roles by signing Ryan Edmondson on loan from Leeds United – who had spent the first half of the season on loan at Fleetwood Town – and Kian Harratt on loan from Huddersfield Town. Having failed to break into the first-team, Ryan Johnson was sold to Stockport County for an undisclosed fee, whilst Danny Amos, Danny Whitehead and Scott Burgess were released. Chris Hussey, a 33-year-old defender with 498 career appearances, was signed from Cheltenham Town for an undisclosed fee. The club then signed 28-year-old defender Connor Hall from Harrogate Town for an undisclosed fee, whilst Leon Legge was allowed to move in the opposite direction. The club played their first home league fixture in seven weeks on 15 January, losing 3–1 to play-off rivals Swindon Town after Covolan was sent off on the stroke of half-time for kicking out at Harry McKirdy; a furious Clarke said that "he has got to learn from that otherwise he won’t be staying at the club for very long". A 1–0 defeat at home to Salford City made it five defeats in seven league games, though spectators felt Vale were the superior side, whilst the highlight of the game was a tractor being sent on to repair a goalpost after Hall collided with it and broke it. The run of defeats were ended with a dour goalless draw at Leyton Orient on 22 January, during which Clarke named only five substitutes due to injury and illnesses to first-team players. The recruitment team sprang into action by bringing in two loanees: winger Joel Cooper from Oxford United and 6 ft 9 in (2.06 m) goalkeeper Tomáš Holý from Ipswich Town. Another new arrival was Harry Charsley, a 25-year-old midfielder signed from Mansfield Town. However, the injury crisis continued as Cass was ruled out of action for the rest of the season after tearing ankle ligaments in training. Devante Rodney left the club after being sold to Walsall. Vale beat relegation-threatened Scunthorpe United 1–0 on 29 January, with Nathan Smith scoring the game's only goal. The club made an eighth and final signing of the window by bringing in defender Sammy Robinson from Manchester City on a permanent transfer.

On 1 February, Vale earned a 1–1 home draw with league leaders Forest Green Rovers and could have won the game if it weren't for Rovers levelling the score with ten minutes left to play. A 3–1 win was achieved at struggling Carlisle, their first away win for two months. The unbeaten run was extended to five games following a 0–0 home draw with third-placed Northampton Town. However, Clarke was highly critical of his side's performance. Another draw against an automatic promotion chasing team was achieved after Proctor's stoppage-time equaliser secured a 1–1 draw at Tranmere in a game Clarke was absent for due to a family bereavement. However, three days later they were the victims of a stoppage-time equaliser as Rochdale won themselves a point with their only shot on target. With Clarke's absence continuing, Adam Murray was brought in to support acting manager Andy Crosby. They oversaw a 2–0 home win over Stevenage which took Vale to within three points of the play-offs, with Crosby saying "I couldn't be prouder of the players".

Vale opened March in much the same fashion as the previous month, drawing 1–1 with mid-table Harrogate Town. A dull 1–0 defeat at Colchester brought the unbeaten run to an end, with the hosts scoring the only goal of the game on 85 minutes. Garrity scored twice as Vale came from behind to beat Crawley 4–1 and reignite their play-off hopes. They again came from a goal down to beat Mansfield 3–1, with substitute Harratt claiming a brace. A third-successive win came at Bradford City, with opposition manager Mark Hughes noting that "they have two strikers [Proctor and Wilson] who were good enough to retain possession and get people around them". The winning streak came to an end with a 0–0 draw at home to second-place Exeter City, with Crosby saying after the game that "I was trying to blow it over the line" as David Amoo had a last minute half-chance to win the game. They returned to the play-off places with a 2–0 home victory over Sutton United, a game notable for a scissor kick goal from Proctor. On 30 March, Clarke began a 'phased return' in support of Crosby, before taking full control again at the end of the season.

Port Vale came from behind to win 2–1 at Barrow and begin April in the automatic promotion places; after the match, Crosby admitted: "I don't think we were at the races in the first half. So, we came up with some solutions at half-time, let's say". A 1–0 win at Salford City, with Charsley scoring his first goal for the club, gave them a three-point gap between the automatic promotion places and the play-offs; opposition manager Gary Bowyer was full of praise for the "Valiants", hailing them as the best side his team had faced throughout the season. Relegation-threatened Oldham were the visitors on 9 April, and despite twice losing the lead from two first-half goals from Proctor, Vale won the 3–2 with a long-range strike from Walker. A Connor Hall goal on 67 minutes gave Vale a 1–0 win at Hartlepool, and after the match Clarke joined the team in celebrating in front of the away support. The winning run looked like being extended when Proctor scored in the second minute of the game with Bristol Rovers in front of 10,840 spectators at Vale Park; however, the "Gas" equalised eight minutes later and went on to win the match 3–1. A poor performance and 2–0 defeat at nearby Walsall saw the Vale drop out of the automatic promotion places.

Port Vale needed to win their final two games to secure promotion but instead fell to a 2–1 home defeat to mid-table Newport County on the May Day bank holiday; Crosby told his team to "shut out emotion" after their third consecutive defeat and to secure a play-off place away at Exeter on the last day of the season. Clarke completed a phased return to the manager role on 6 May. Vale won 1–0 at Exeter the following day with a James Wilson goal to book themselves a place in the play-offs and deny the hosts the league title. A fifth-place finish left them facing Swindon Town in the play-off semi-finals. Fans queued overnight to be included in the 2,200 ticket allocation for the first leg at the County Ground – the club's first play-off match in 29 years. McKirdy scored a brace to put Swindon 2–0 up, though Wilson pulled a goal back to keep the Vale in the tie and leave them facing just the one goal deficit to overcome at Vale Park. Wilson levelled the tie just eight minutes into the return fixture in front of 11,669 spectators at Vale Park, and despite it being an open game there were no further goals and the tie finished 2–2 on aggregate after extra-time; Port Vale won the resulting penalty shoot-out 6–5 to secure a place in the play-off final at Wembley Stadium. A pitch invasion ensued, during which Swindon Town manager Ben Garner said his players were "physically and verbally abused". An emotional Clarke remarked that "it typified our heart all season, the heart and desire" how his side recovered from missing two penalties before Swindon had missed any of theirs. He also issued an apology as he had been sent off for an altercation with Dion Conroy in extra-time, and went on to say that: "We've got one more game to go against Mansfield, which is fitting because it's where my eldest daughter came from.... it'll be an emotional day but I'm looking forward to the final.". The final proved to be a straightforward affair as Vale cruised to a 3–0 victory after going two goals up within 24 minutes and Mansfield having a man sent off on 35 minutes; Harratt and Wilson scored the first two goals, whilst former Mansfield veteran Benning made the game secure with a late third. Despite the game being largely decided by half-time, it was still a highly emotional occasion as Clarke dedicated the win to his daughter, Ellie Clarke, who died in February at the age of 18. David Amoo was the only player not retained at the end of the season. James Gibbons also left the club to join Bristol Rovers after rejecting Vale's offer of a new contract.

=== Finances ===
For a fifth-successive season, the club kept season tickets at an "early bird price" of £310 in the Lorne Street and £295 in all other stands. Over 5,000 season tickets were sold. The club sold over 12,000 replica kits, with the home shirts inspired by Roger Federer and the away kits inspired by the club's "Black and Gold Until It's Sold" fans' group, both designed by Patrick Shanahan. The club lost £1.2 million over the season and was subsidised via loans from owner Carol Shanahan.

=== Cup competitions ===
Port Vale were drawn at home to Accrington Stanley (League One) in the first round of the FA Cup. They belied their league status to cruise to a 5–1 victory after the away side were reduced to ten men on the 70-minute mark, with Wilson scoring a hat-trick and Cass and Lloyd scoring their first goals for the club. They were drawn away to League One side Burton Albion in the second round and seemed to have been beaten 1–0 when Politic scored an equalizing goal on 79 minutes and a winner just three minutes later. Their reward was a home tie with Premier League side Brentford in the third round. Brentford won the game 4–1, though Harratt's debut goal on the 70th-minute had given the Vale hope of coming back from 2–0 down, whilst Clarke was pleased with his side's performance considering they had not played a game in four weeks.

Vale were beaten 2–1 by Sunderland (League One) in the first round of the EFL Cup. However, Clarke berated the referee for disallowing a Vale goal for a foul on the goalkeeper. He stated that the decision to award Sunderland a penalty for a foul by Stone was also incorrect.

Vale were drawn into Northern Group D of the EFL Trophy alongside Bolton Wanderers (League One), Rochdale (League Two) and Liverpool U21. Seven changes were made way at Bolton Wanderers, and Vale came from a goal down to lead 2–1, only to lose the game 3–2. They went on to beat Rochdale 1–0 at home thanks to a stoppage-time winner, in a game which saw 17-year-old Ellis Jones make his debut as a half-time substitute. Despite resting most of the first-team, Clarke's side cruised to a 5–0 victory over the Liverpool youth team. They were drawn away to League One leaders Rotherham United in the second round, and held the "Millers" to a creditable 1–1 draw before they lost the penalty shoot-out 5–3.

== Results ==
=== Pre-season ===
3 July 2021 Friendly	Kidsgrove Athletic	0–2	Port Vale	Kidsgrove
15:00 BST		Report	Wilson 30'; Bailey 82'	Stadium: Hollinwood Road; Attendance: 1,300

9 July 2021 Friendly	Stafford Rangers	2–0	Port Vale	Stafford
19:00 BST	Ofori 39' (pen.), 63'	Report		Stadium: Marston Road; Referee: Steve Martin

10 July 2021 Friendly	Newcastle Town	2–6	Port Vale	Newcastle-under-Lyme
15:00 BST	Chimenes 63', 69'	Report	Conlon 5', 26'; Worrall 31'; Bailey 41'; McFarlane 63', 88'	Stadium: Lyme Valley Stadium; Attendance: 1,066

13 July 2021 Friendly	Fleetwood Town	1–0	Port Vale	Thornton-Cleveleys
13:00 BST	Rossiter 51'	Report		Stadium: Poolfoot Farm; Attendance: 200

17 July 2021 Friendly	Port Vale	0–2	Nottingham Forest	Burslem
15:00 BST		Report	Mighten 13'; Colback 24'	Stadium: Vale Park; Attendance: 0

27 July 2021 Friendly	Port Vale	1–2	Sheffield Wednesday	Burslem
19:30 BST	Conlon 31'	Report	Iorfa 24'; Dele-Bashiru 80'	Stadium: Vale Park; Attendance: 2,708

31 July 2021 Friendly	Chesterfield	0–1	Port Vale	Chesterfield, Derbyshire
15:00 BST		Report	Wilson 36'	Stadium: Technique Stadium

=== EFL League Two ===
==== League table ====
Pos	Team	Pld	W	D	L	GF	GA	GD	Pts	Promotion, qualification or relegation
2	Exeter City (P)	46	23	15	8	65	41	+24	84	Promotion to EFL League One
3	Bristol Rovers (P)	46	23	11	12	71	49	+22	80	Promotion to EFL League One
4	Northampton Town	46	23	11	12	60	38	+22	80	Qualification for League Two play-offs
5	Port Vale (O, P)	46	22	12	12	67	46	+21	78	Qualification for League Two play-offs
6	Swindon Town	46	22	11	13	77	54	+23	77	Qualification for League Two play-offs
7	Mansfield Town	46	22	11	13	67	52	+15	77	Qualification for League Two play-offs
8	Sutton United	46	22	10	14	69	53	+16	76	

Source: EFL Official Website
Rules for classification: 1) Points; 2) Goal difference; 3) Number of goals scored; 4) Head-to-head results; 5) Wins; 6) Away goals; 7) Penalty points (sec 9.5); 8) 12-point sending off offences
(O) Play-off winners; (P) Promoted

==== Results by matchday ====
Matchday	1	2	3	4	5	6	7	8	9	10	11	12	13	14	15	16	17	18	19	20	21	22	23	24	25	26	27	28	29	30	31	32	33	34	35	36	37	38	39	40	41	42	43	44	45	46
Ground	A	H	H	A	A	H	A	H	A	H	A	H	A	H	A	H	A	H	H	A	A	H	H	A	H	H	A	H	A	A	H	A	A	H	H	A	H	H	A	A	H	A	H	A	H	A
Result	L	D	D	D	W	L	W	W	W	W	L	W	D	W	W	D	L	L	W	W	L	L	L	D	W	D	W	D	D	D	W	D	L	W	W	W	D	W	W	W	W	W	L	L	L	W
Position	22	18	18	17	10	17	11	7	4	3	4	3	4	2	2	2	3	5	5	3	3	9	9	9	9	9	8	9	9	10	9	10	10	10	9	8	9	4	3	3	3	3	3	4	6	5
Points	0	1	2	3	6	6	9	12	15	18	18	21	22	25	28	29	29	29	32	35	35	35	35	36	39	40	43	44	45	46	49	50	50	53	56	59	60	63	66	69	72	75	75	75	75	78

Updated to match(es) played on 7 May 2022. Source: Statto.com
A = Away; H = Home; W = Win; D = Draw; L = Loss

==== Matches ====
Win Draw Loss

7 August 2021 1	Northampton Town	1–0	Port Vale	Northampton
15:00 BST	Ashley-Seal 23'	Report		Stadium: Sixfields Stadium; Attendance: 5,804; Referee: Simon Mather; Assistant referees: Daniel Flynn, Mark Jones; Fourth official: Trevor Kettle

14 August 2021 2	Port Vale	0–0	Tranmere Rovers	Burslem
15:00 BST		Report		Stadium: Vale Park; Attendance: 6,986; Referee: Andy Haines; Assistant referees: Lee Freeman, Oliver Bickle; Fourth official: Thomas Harty

17 August 2021 3	Port Vale	0–0	Carlisle United	Burslem
19:45 BST		Report		Stadium: Vale Park; Attendance: 4,943; Referee: Paul Howard; Assistant referees: Declan Ford, Lewis Raper; Fourth official: Matthew Smith

21 August 2021 4	Stevenage	1–1	Port Vale	Stevenage
15:00 BST	Norris 33'	Report	Rodney 20'	Stadium: Broadhall Way; Attendance: 2,727; Referee: Sam Purkiss; Assistant referees: Darren Blunden, Kevin Howick; Fourth official: Samuel Ogles

28 August 2021 5	Forest Green Rovers	0–2	Port Vale	Nailsworth
15:00 BST		Report	Proctor 6', 9'	Stadium: The New Lawn; Attendance: 2,402; Referee: Charles Breakspear; Assistant referees: Kevin Morris, Marvyn Amphlett; Fourth official: Grant Taylor

4 September 2021 6	Port Vale	2–3	Rochdale	Burslem
15:00 BST	Proctor 8', 59'	Report	Beesley 24', 53'; O'Keeffe 78'	Stadium: Vale Park; Attendance: 6,113; Referee: Marc Edwards; Assistant referees: Adam Ricketts, Declan Ford; Fourth official: Geoff Russell

11 September 2021 7	Swindon Town	1–2	Port Vale	Swindon
15:00 BST	Simpson 49'	Report	Garrity 22', 81'	Stadium: County Ground; Attendance: 8,734; Referee: Neil Hair; Assistant referees: Louis Marks, Richard Morris; Fourth official: Dean Treleaven

18 September 2021 8	Port Vale	2–0	Harrogate Town	Burslem
15:00 BST	Worrall 27'; Wilson 47'	Report		Stadium: Vale Park; Attendance: 5,435; Referee: Andrew Kitchen; Assistant referees: Bradley Hall, Matthew Smith; Fourth official: Paul Graham

25 September 2021 9	Scunthorpe United	0–1	Port Vale	Scunthorpe
15:00 BST		Report	Garrity 44'	Stadium: Glanford Park; Attendance: 2,513; Referee: Robert Lewis; Assistant referees: Joe Clark, Alan Clayton; Fourth official: Martin Coy

2 October 2021 10	Port Vale	3–2	Leyton Orient	Burslem
15:00 BST	Wilson 6'; Politic 90+1'; Proctor 90+3'	Report	Jones 60' (og.); James 86'	Stadium: Vale Park; Attendance: 5,667; Referee: Chris Sarginson; Assistant referees: Mark Cunliffe, Christopher Kidd; Fourth official: Robert Atkin

9 October 2021 11	Sutton United	4–3	Port Vale	Sutton, London
15:00 BST	Milsom 36'; Garrity 69' (og.); Randall 87'; Rowe 90+1'	Report	Smith 21'; Proctor 28'; Conlon 78'	Stadium: Gander Green Lane; Attendance: 3,905; Referee: Declan Bourne; Assistant referees: Paul Yates, Daniel Bonneywell; Fourth official: Ryan Whitaker

16 October 2021 12	Port Vale	3–1	Barrow	Burslem
15:00 BST	Politic 51'; Jones 56' (og.); Benning 85'	Report	Banks 33'	Stadium: Vale Park; Attendance: 5,951; Referee: Andy Woolmer; Assistant referees: Grant Taylor, Shaun Hudson, Philip Dermott; Fourth official: Scott Oldham

19 October 2021 13	Mansfield Town	1–1	Port Vale	Mansfield
19:45 BST	Lapslie 64'	Report	Conlon 33'	Stadium: Field Mill; Attendance: 4,202; Referee: Will Finnie; Assistant referees: Anthony Da Costa, Declan Ford; Fourth official: Ian Smedley

23 October 2021 14	Port Vale	3–0	Colchester United	Burslem
15:00 BST	Gibbons 6'; Wilson 16'; Martin 61'	Report		Stadium: Vale Park; Attendance: 5,423; Referee: Seb Stockbridge; Assistant referees: Steven Plane, Peter Gooch; Fourth official: Christopher Husband

30 October 2021 15	Crawley Town	1–4	Port Vale	Crawley
15:00 BST	Appiah 44'	Report	Pett 76'; Conlon 49'; Francomb 80' (og.); Amoo 90+4'	Stadium: The People's Pension Stadium; Attendance: 2,234; Referee: Trevor Kettle; Assistant referees: Darren Blunden, Michael Webb; Fourth official: Kevin Howick

13 November 2021 16	Port Vale	1–1	Bradford City	Burslem
12:00 GMT	Wilson 56'	Report	Angol 74'	Stadium: Vale Park; Attendance: 7,010; Referee: Lee Swabey; Assistant referees: Matthew Parry, Thomas Harty; Fourth official: Ben Toner

20 November 2021 17	Oldham Athletic	3–2	Port Vale	Oldham
15:00 GMT	Keillor-Dunn 31'; Hart 81'; Martin 90+3' (og.)	Report	Worrall 20'; Gibbons 52'	Stadium: Boundary Park; Attendance: 6,080; Referee: Carl Brook; Assistant referees: Declan Ford, Hristo Karaivanov; Fourth official: Mark Cunliffe

23 November 2021 18	Port Vale	0–1	Walsall	Burslem
19:45 GMT		Report	Kiernan 29'	Stadium: Vale Park; Attendance: 6,248; Referee: Simon Mather; Assistant referees: Grant Taylor, Steven Plane; Fourth official: Conor Brown

27 November 2021 19	Port Vale	2–0	Hartlepool United	Burslem
15:00 GMT	Garrity 31'; Pett 90'	Report		Stadium: Vale Park; Attendance: 4,839; Referee: Tom Reeves; Assistant referees: Chris Isherwood, Lewis Raper; Fourth official: Alan Clayton

7 December 2021 20	Bristol Rovers	1–2	Port Vale	Bristol
19:45 GMT	Collins 56'	Report	Garrity 31', 33'	Stadium: Memorial Stadium; Attendance: 6,071; Referee: Craig Hicks; Assistant referees: Kevin Howick, Alex James; Fourth official: Lee Swabey

11 December 2021 21	Newport County	2–1	Port Vale	Newport
15:00 GMT	Telford 69'; Azaz 75'	Report	Garrity 25'	Stadium: Rodney Parade; Attendance: 4,074; Referee: Paul Howard; Assistant referees: Daniel Flynn, Justin Amey; Fourth official: Brett Huxtable

15 January 2022 22	Port Vale	1–3	Swindon Town	Burslem
15:00 GMT	Harratt 26'	Report	Williams 20'; Gladwin 45+5' (pen.); Smith 69' (og.)	Stadium: Vale Park; Attendance: 6,064; Referee: Andy Haines; Assistant referees: Thomas Harty, Kevin Morris; Fourth official: Andy Hendley

18 January 2022 23	Port Vale	0–1	Salford City	Burslem
19:45 GMT		Report	Elliott 50'	Stadium: Vale Park; Attendance: 4,311; Referee: James Bell; Assistant referees: Matthew Parry, Conor Brown; Fourth official: Darren Handley

22 January 2022 24	Leyton Orient	0–0	Port Vale	Leyton, London
15:00 GMT		Report		Stadium: Brisbane Road; Attendance: 5,761; Referee: Declan Bourne; Assistant referees: Paul Kelly, Stephen Brown; Fourth official: Gareth Viccars

29 January 2022 25	Port Vale	1–0	Scunthorpe United	Burslem
15:00 GMT	Smith 72'	Report		Stadium: Vale Park; Attendance: 5,467; Referee: Marc Edwards; Assistant referees: Darren Wilding, Gary Hilton; Fourth official: Mark Heywood

1 February 2022 26	Port Vale	1–1	Forest Green Rovers	Burslem
15:00 GMT	Edmondson 12'	Report	Stevens 80'	Stadium: Vale Park; Attendance: 4,508; Referee: Tom Reeves; Assistant referees: Ian Smedley, Lee Freeman; Fourth official: Peter Wright

8 February 2022 27	Carlisle United	1–3	Port Vale	Carlisle
19:45 GMT	Windsor 21'	Report	Worrall 1'; Wilson 43'; Amoo 81'	Stadium: Brunton Park; Attendance: 3,379; Referee: Andrew Kitchen; Assistant referees: David Avent, Helen Byrne, Geoffrey Liddle; Fourth official: Paul Marsden

12 February 2022 28	Port Vale	0–0	Northampton Town	Burslem
15:00 GMT		Report		Stadium: Vale Park; Attendance: 5,979; Referee: Alan Young; Assistant referees: Oliver Bickle, Richard Morris; Fourth official: Joe Clark

19 February 2022 29	Tranmere Rovers	1–1	Port Vale	Birkenhead
15:00 GMT	Hawkes 50'	Report	Proctor 90+4'	Stadium: Prenton Park; Attendance: 7,456; Referee: David Rock; Assistant referees: Daniel Flynn, Richard Woodward; Fourth official: Conor Brown

22 February 2022 30	Rochdale	1–1	Port Vale	Rochdale
BST	Ball 90+3'	Report	Garrity 45'	Stadium: Spotland Stadium; Attendance: 2,667; Referee: Sam Barrott; Assistant referees: Lisa Rashid, Mark Cunliffe; Fourth official: Ben Speedie

26 February 2022 31	Port Vale	2–0	Stevenage	Burslem
15:00 GMT	O'Neill 6' (og.); Edmondson 12'	Report		Stadium: Vale Park; Attendance: 5,157; Referee: Scott Oldham; Assistant referees: Geoff Russell, Bradley Hall; Fourth official: Danny Gratton

1 March 2022 32	Harrogate Town	1–1	Port Vale	Harrogate
19:45 BST	Pattison 23'	Report	Edmondson 68'	Stadium: Wetherby Road; Attendance: 2,257; Referee: Darren Bond; Assistant referees: Philip Dermott, Akil Howson; Fourth official: Andy Haines

5 March 2022 33	Colchester United	1–0	Port Vale	Colchester
15:00 GMT	Dallison 85'	Report		Stadium: Colchester Community Stadium; Attendance: 2,772; Referee: Brett Huxtable; Assistant referees: Joseph Stokes, James Vallance; Fourth official: Paul Lister

12 March 2022 34	Port Vale	4–1	Crawley Town	Burslem
15:00 GMT	Ben Garrity 26', 51'; Worrall 38'; Hall 61'	Report	Smith 9' (og.)	Stadium: Vale Park; Attendance: 5,131; Referee: Ross Joyce; Assistant referees: Adam Ricketts, Christopher Husband; Fourth official: Hristo Karaivanov

15 March 2022 35	Port Vale	3–1	Mansfield Town	Burslem
19:45 GMT	Wilson 33'; Harratt 76', 88'	Report	Oates 22'	Stadium: Vale Park; Attendance: 5,233; Referee: Peter Wright; Assistant referees: Matthew Parry, Anthony Moore; Fourth official: Matthew Smith

19 March 2022 36	Bradford City	1–2	Port Vale	Bradford
15:00 GMT	Vernam 70'	Report	Garrity 50'; Wilson 63'	Stadium: Valley Parade; Attendance: 16,046; Referee: Darren Drysdale; Assistant referees: Lewis Raper, Stephen Wade; Fourth official: Alan Clayton

22 March 2022 37	Port Vale	0–0	Exeter City	Burslem
19:45 GMT		Report		Stadium: Vale Park; Attendance: 5,301; Referee: Bobby Madley; Assistant referees: Christopher Ward, Mark Jones; Fourth official: Scott Oldham

26 March 2022 38	Port Vale	2–0	Sutton United	Burslem
15:00 GMT	Wilson 7'; Proctor 23'	Report		Stadium: Vale Park; Attendance: 6,362; Referee: Martin Coy; Assistant referees: Steven Plane, Abbas Khan; Fourth official: Richard Woodward

2 April 2022 39	Barrow	1–2	Port Vale	Barrow-in-Furness
15:00 BST	Kay 24'	Report	Proctor 59'; Martin 89'	Stadium: Holker Street; Attendance: 3,215; Referee: James Oldham; Assistant referees: David Avent, Simon Clayton; Fourth official: Lewis Smith

5 April 2022 40	Salford City	0–1	Port Vale	Salford
19:45 BST		Report	Charsley 59'	Stadium: Moor Lane; Attendance: 2,449; Referee: Darren Handley; Assistant referees: Richard Wrigglesworth, Robert Atkin, David Hunt, Richard Wigglesworth; Fourth official: Richard Wild

9 April 2022 41	Port Vale	3–2	Oldham Athletic	Burslem
15:00 BST	Proctor 10', 34'; Walker 54'	Report	Missilou 16'; Keillor-Dunn 45+1'	Stadium: Vale Park; Attendance: 8,354; Referee: Will Finnie; Assistant referees: Daniel Flynn, Grant Taylor; Fourth official: Mark Cunliffe

15 April 2022 42	Hartlepool United	0–1	Port Vale	Hartlepool
15:00 BST		Report	Hall 67'	Stadium: Victoria Park; Attendance: 5,517; Referee: Chris Sarginson; Assistant referees: Conor Brown, Wayne Grunnill; Fourth official: Scott Williams

18 April 2022 43	Port Vale	1–3	Bristol Rovers	Burslem
15:00 BST	Proctor 2'	Report	Anderson 10'; Connolly 32'; Loft 90+4'	Stadium: Vale Park; Attendance: 10,840; Referee: Craig Hicks; Assistant referees: Joe Clark, Andy Hendley; Fourth official: Anthony Moore

23 April 2022 44	Walsall	2–0	Port Vale	Walsall
15:00 BST	Perry 67'; Osadebe 90+3'	Report		Stadium: Bescot Stadium; Attendance: 6,840; Referee: Tom Nield; Assistant referees: Oliver Bickle, Marvyn Amphlett; Fourth official: Thomas Harty

2 May 2022 45	Port Vale	1–2	Newport County	Burslem
15:00 BST	Garrity 51'	Report	Haynes 3'; Azaz 72'	Stadium: Vale Park; Attendance: 9,048; Referee: Carl Brook; Assistant referees: Conor Brown, Dumitru-Ravel Cheosiaua, Adam Ricketts; Fourth official: Darren Drysdale

7 May 2022 46	Exeter City	0–1	Port Vale	Exeter
15:00 BST		Report	Wilson 36'	Stadium: St James Park; Referee: Tom Reeves; Assistant referees: Daniel Flynn, Conor Farrell; Fourth official: Carl Brook

==== Play-offs ====
15 May 2022 Semi-final first leg	Swindon Town	2–1	Port Vale	Swindon
12:00 BST	McKirdy 26', 68'	Report	Wilson 83'	Stadium: County Ground; Attendance: 14,086; Referee: Ross Joyce; Assistant referees: Paul Lister, Andrew Aylott; Fourth official: Tom Reeves

19 May 2022 Semi-final second leg	Port Vale	1–0 (2–2 agg.) (6–5 p)	Swindon Town	Burslem
19:45 BST	Wilson 8'	Report		Stadium: Vale Park; Attendance: 11,669; Referee: Seb Stockbridge; Assistant referees: Lisa Rashid, Hristo Karaivanov; Fourth official: Martin Coy
	Penalties
	Wilson (penalty scored); Worrall (penalty missed); Edmondson (penalty missed); Charsley (penalty scored); Pett (penalty scored); Garrity (penalty scored); Gibbons (penalty scored); Benning (penalty scored)		Payne (penalty scored); Gladwin (penalty scored); McKirdy (penalty missed); Reed (penalty scored); Davison (penalty missed); Conroy (penalty scored); Egbo (penalty scored); Iandolo (penalty missed)

28 May 2022 Final	Mansfield Town	0–3	Port Vale	London
16:00 BST		Report	Harratt 20'; Wilson 24'; Benning 85'	Stadium: Wembley Stadium; Attendance: 37,303; Referee: Jarred Gillett; Assistant referees: Nick Greenhalgh, Neil Davies; Fourth official: Josh Smith; Man of the Match: James Wilson

=== FA Cup ===
6 November 2021 R1	Port Vale	5–1	Accrington Stanley	Burslem
15:00 GMT	Wilson 30', 73', 79'; Cass 85'; Lloyd 90+3'	Report	Hamilton 85'	Stadium: Vale Park; Attendance: 4,605; Referee: Ben Speedie; Assistant referees: Bradley Hall, Simon Shaw; Fourth official: Andy Hendley

4 December 2021 R2	Burton Albion	1–2	Port Vale	Burton upon Trent
15:00 GMT	Leak 23'	Report	Politic 79', 82'	Stadium: Pirelli Stadium; Attendance: 3,539; Referee: Martin Coy; Assistant referees: Ian Smedley, Dumitru-Ravel Cheosiaua; Fourth official: Rob Ellis

8 January 2022 R3	Port Vale	1–4	Brentford	Burslem
15:00 GMT	Harratt 70'	Report	Forss 26'; Mbeumo 66', 76', 87' (pen.)	Stadium: Vale Park; Attendance: 8,069; Referee: Thomas Bramall; Assistant referees: Mark Dwyer, Adrian Waters; Fourth official: Marc Edwards

=== EFL Cup ===
10 August 2021 R1	Port Vale	1–2	Sunderland	Burslem
19:45 BST	Proctor 67'	Report	Hawkes 40'; O'Brien 50' (pen.)	Stadium: Vale Park; Attendance: 3,267; Referee: Sam Allison; Assistant referees: Anthony Moore, Lisa Rashid; Fourth official: Lewis Smith

=== EFL Trophy ===
Pos	Div	Team	Pld	W	PW	PL	L	GF	GA	GD	Pts	Qualification
1	L1	Bolton Wanderers	3	3	0	0	0	10	3	+7	9	Advance to Round 2
2	L2	Port Vale	3	2	0	0	1	8	3	+5	6	Advance to Round 2
3	L2	Rochdale	3	1	0	0	2	4	4	0	3	
4	ACA	Liverpool U21	3	0	0	0	3	1	13	−12	0	

Source: EFL.com

31 August 2021 Group stage	Bolton Wanderers	3–2	Port Vale	Horwich
19:00 BST	Doyle 28'; Delfouneso 54'; Afolayan 77'	Report	Conlon 35'; Amoo 43'	Stadium: University of Bolton Stadium; Attendance: 2,926; Referee: Scott Oldham; Assistant referees: Grant Taylor, Matthew Parry, Gary Hilton; Fourth official: Garreth Rhodes

5 October 2021 Group stage	Port Vale	1–0	Rochdale	Burslem
19:00 BST	Taylor 90+3' (og.)	Report		Stadium: Vale Park; Attendance: 1,727; Referee: James Oldham; Assistant referees: Kenwyn Hughes, Dumitru-Ravel Cheosiaua; Fourth official: Lisa Rashid

9 November 2021 Group stage	Port Vale	5–0	Liverpool U21	Burslem
19:00 GMT	Lloyd 15'; Politic 26'; Benning 51'; Martin 63'; Taylor 77'	Report		Stadium: Vale Park; Attendance: 2,349; Referee: Tom Nield; Assistant referees: Ian Smedley, Lee Freeman; Fourth official: Oliver Bickle

30 November 2021 R2	Rotherham United	1–1 (5–3 p)	Port Vale	Rotherham
19:00 GMT	Smith 56'	Report	Amoo 87'	Stadium: New York Stadium; Attendance: 1,560; Referee: Peter Wright; Assistant referees: Daniel Woodward, Simon Clayton; Fourth official: Daniel Middleton
	Penalties
	Smith (penalty scored); Sadlier (penalty scored); Ferguson (penalty scored); Ladapo (penalty scored); Mattock (penalty scored)		Conlon (penalty scored); Walker (penalty scored); Rodney (penalty scored); Amoo (penalty missed)

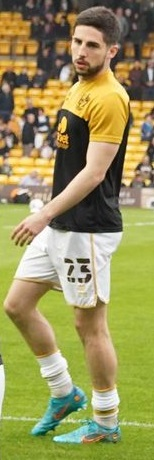
Tom Pett played 47 games.

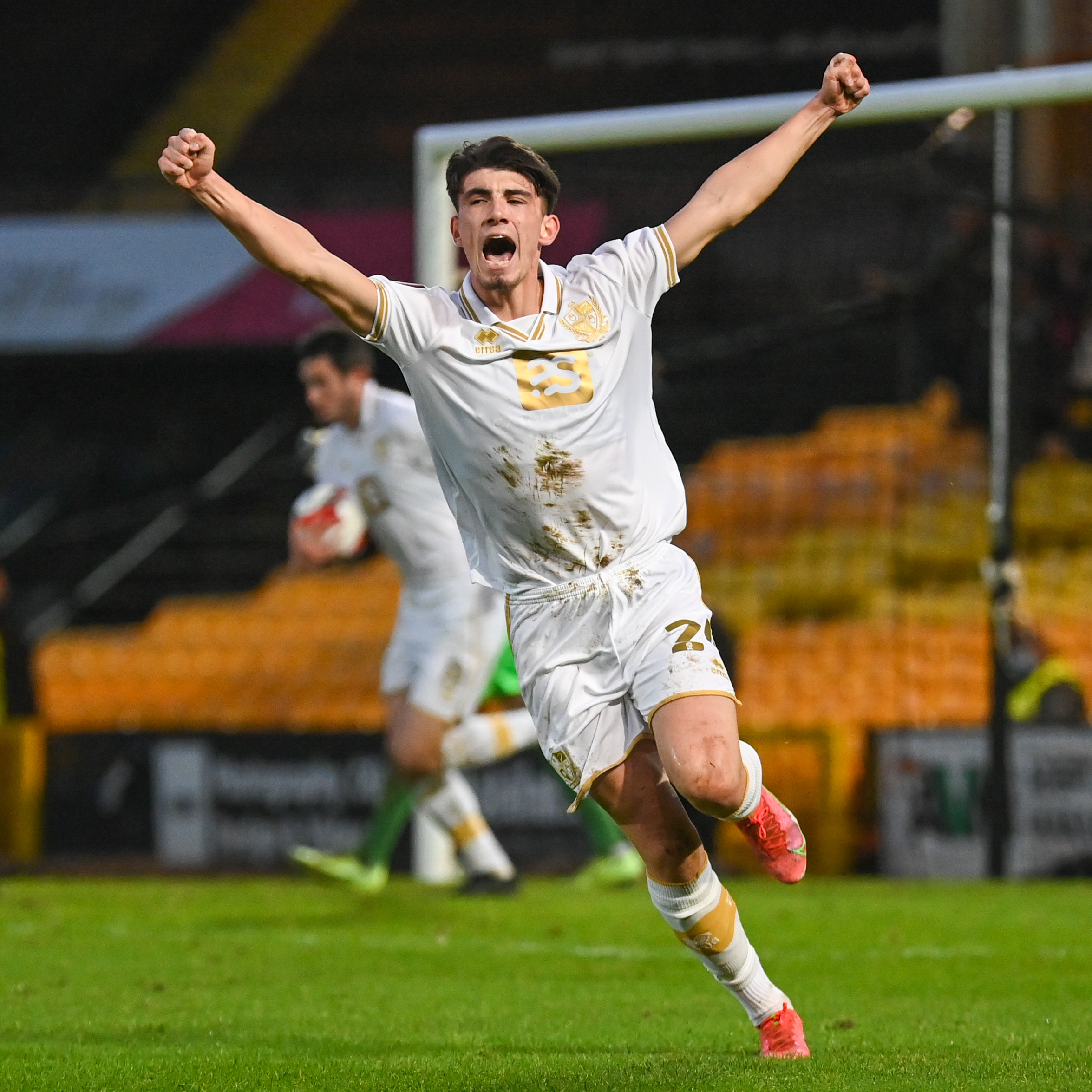
Kian Harratt scored in the play-off final.

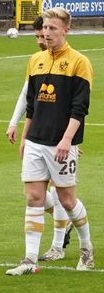
Harry Charsley featured 23 times

Aaron Martin played 36 matches.

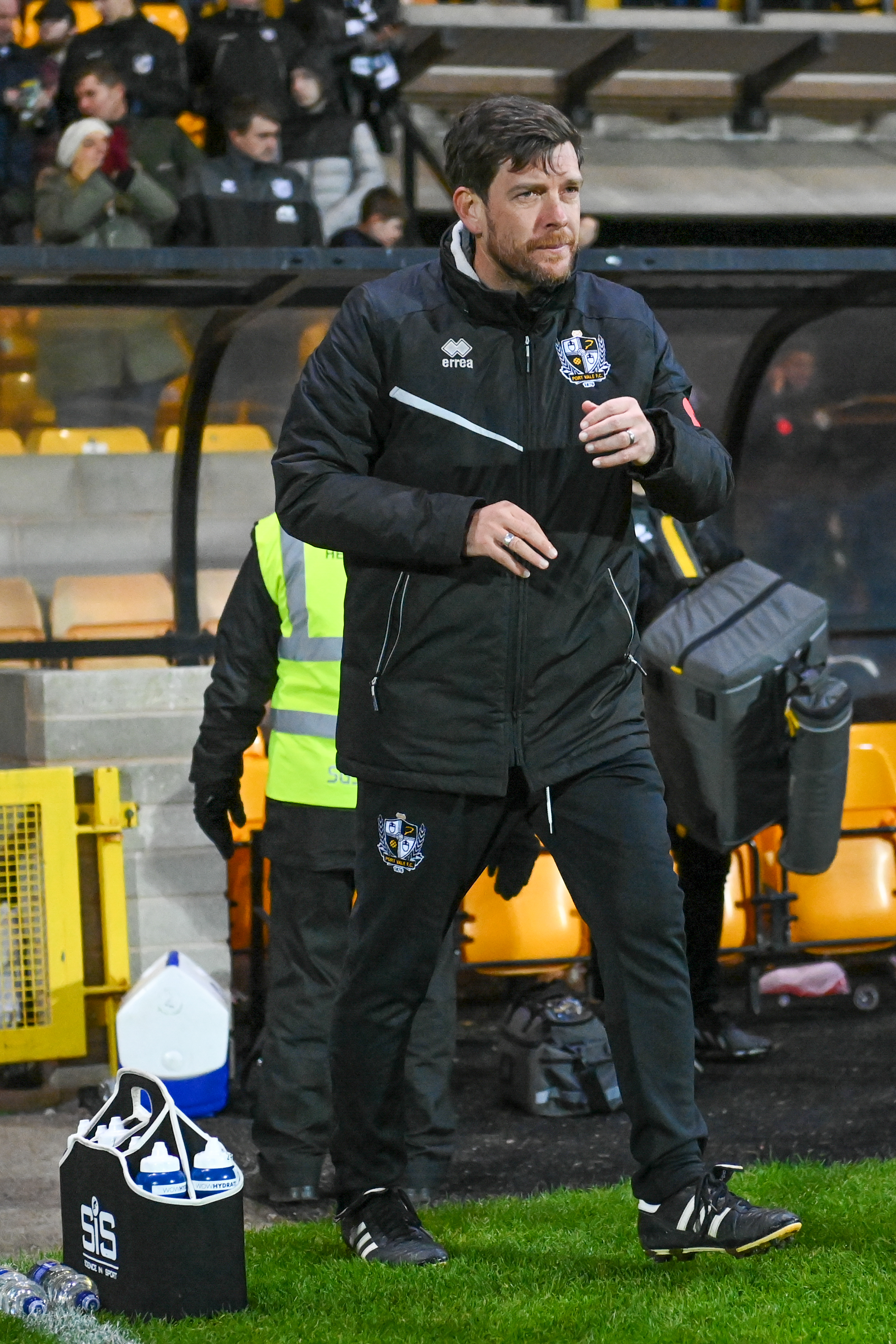
Manager Darrell Clarke.

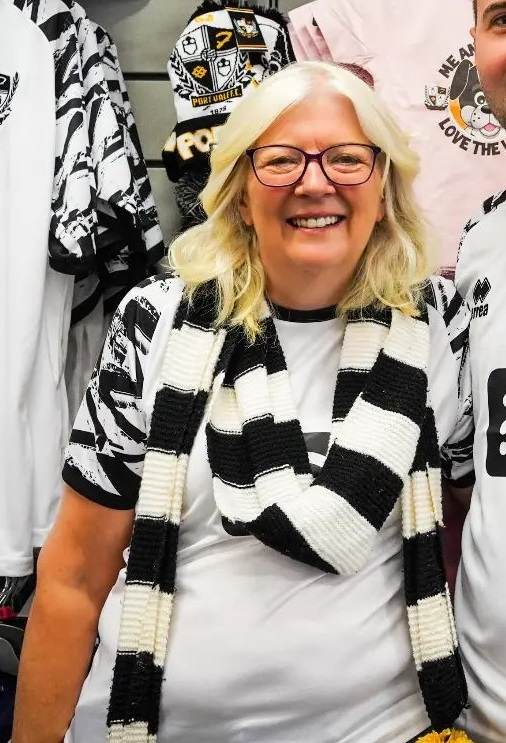
Club chairperson Carol Shanahan.

== Squad statistics ==
=== Appearances and goals ===
Key to positions: GK – Goalkeeper; DF – Defender; MF – Midfielder; FW – Forward

No.	Pos	Nat	Player	Total		EFL League Two		FA Cup		EFL Cup		EFL Trophy		EFL playoffs	
No.	Pos	Nat	Player	Apps	Goals	Apps	Goals	Apps	Goals	Apps	Goals	Apps	Goals	Apps	Goals
1	GK	(Brazil) BRA	Lucas Covolan	22	0	21	0	1	0	0	0	0	0	0	0
2	DF	(England) ENG	James Gibbons	31	2	24	2	2	0	0	0	2	0	3	0
3	DF	(England) ENG	Dan Jones	26	0	23	0	1	0	1	0	1	0	0	0
4	MF	(England) ENG	Brad Walker	35	1	28	1	3	0	1	0	3	0	0	0
5	DF	(England) ENG	Connor Hall	27	2	24	2	0	0	0	0	0	0	3	0
6	DF	(England) ENG	Nathan Smith	53	2	44	2	3	0	1	0	2	0	3	0
7	MF	(England) ENG	David Worrall	50	4	41	4	3	0	1	0	2	0	3	0
8	MF	(England) ENG	Ben Garrity	53	12	43	12	3	0	1	0	3	0	3	0
9	FW	(England) ENG	James Wilson	47	15	41	9	2	3	1	0	0	0	3	3
10	MF	(England) ENG	Tom Conlon	23	4	19	3	2	0	0	0	2	1	0	0
11	DF	(England) ENG	Mal Benning	36	3	27	1	1	0	1	0	4	1	3	1
13	FW	(England) ENG	Jamie Proctor	34	13	31	12	0	0	1	1	0	0	2	0
14	MF	(England) ENG	Alex Hurst	2	0	1	0	0	0	0	0	1	0	0	0
15	DF	(England) ENG	Chris Hussey	19	0	19	0	0	0	0	0	0	0	0	0
16	DF	(England) ENG	Aaron Martin	36	3	29	2	3	0	0	0	2	1	2	0
17	MF	(England) ENG	Jake Taylor	18	1	11	0	1	0	0	0	3	1	3	0
18	FW	(England) ENG	Eden Bailey	2	0	1	0	0	0	1	0	0	0	0	0
19	MF	(England) ENG	David Amoo	35	4	28	2	2	0	1	0	4	2	0	0
20	MF	(Republic of Ireland) IRL	Harry Charsley	23	1	20	1	0	0	0	0	0	0	3	0
21	DF	(England) ENG	Sammy Robinson	1	0	1	0	0	0	0	0	0	0	0	0
22	GK	(Czech Republic) CZE	Tomáš Holý	9	0	9	0	0	0	0	0	0	0	0	0
23	MF	(England) ENG	Tom Pett	47	2	40	2	2	0	1	0	1	0	3	0
24	FW	(England) ENG	Kian Harratt	22	5	19	3	1	1	0	0	0	0	2	1
25	MF	(England) ENG	Ellis Jones	1	0	0	0	0	0	0	0	1	0	0	0
26	GK	(England) ENG	Aidan Stone	28	0	18	0	2	0	1	0	4	0	3	0
28	MF	(England) ENG	Kamani McFarlane	0	0	0	0	0	0	0	0	0	0	0	0
29	FW	(England) ENG	Ryan Edmondson	21	3	19	3	0	0	0	0	0	0	2	0
30	MF	(Northern Ireland) NIR	Joel Cooper	6	0	6	0	0	0	0	0	0	0	0	0
31	GK	(England) ENG	Joe Collinge	0	0	0	0	0	0	0	0	0	0	0	0
32	MF	(England) ENG	Tommy McDermott	0	0	0	0	0	0	0	0	0	0	0	0
Players who featured but departed the club during the season:
5	DF	(England) ENG	Leon Legge	8	0	5	0	0	0	1	0	2	0	0	0
15	DF	(Northern Ireland) NIR	Ryan Johnson	8	0	4	0	0	0	0	0	4	0	0	0
20	FW	(England) ENG	George Lloyd	11	2	7	0	1	1	0	0	3	1	0	0
21	FW	(England) ENG	Devante Rodney	17	1	15	1	0	0	0	0	2	0	0	0
22	MF	(Romania) ROU	Dennis Politic	16	5	10	2	3	2	0	0	3	1	0	0
24	DF	(Northern Ireland) NIR	Danny Amos	3	0	0	0	0	0	0	0	3	0	0	0
27	DF	(England) ENG	Lewis Cass	27	1	19	0	3	1	1	0	4	0	0	0
33	MF	(England) ENG	Scott Burgess	3	0	2	0	0	0	0	0	1	0	0	0
	FW	(Jamaica) JAM	Theo Robinson	0	0	0	0	0	0	0	0	0	0	0	0
	MF	(England) ENG	Danny Whitehead	0	0	0	0	0	0	0	0	0	0	0	0

=== Top scorers ===
Place	Position	Nation	Number	Name	EFL League Two	FA Cup	EFL Cup	EFL Trophy	Play-offs	Total
1	FW	England	9	James Wilson	9	3	0	0	3	15
2	FW	England	13	Jamie Proctor	12	0	1	0	0	13
3	MF	England	8	Ben Garrity	12	0	0	0	0	12
4	FW	England	24	Kian Harratt	3	1	0	0	1	5
–	MF	Romania	22	Dennis Politic	2	2	0	1	0	5
6	FW	England	19	David Amoo	2	0	0	2	0	4
–	FW	England	10	Tom Conlon	3	0	0	1	0	4
–	MF	England	7	David Worrall	4	0	0	0	0	4
9	DF	England	11	Mal Benning	1	0	0	1	1	3
–	FW	England	29	Ryan Edmondson	3	0	0	0	0	3
–	DF	England	16	Aaron Martin	2	0	0	1	0	3
12	DF	England	2	James Gibbons	2	0	0	0	0	2
–	DF	England	5	Connor Hall	2	0	0	0	0	2
–	FW	England	20	George Lloyd	0	1	0	1	0	2
–	MF	England	23	Tom Pett	2	0	0	0	0	2
–	DF	England	6	Nathan Smith	2	0	0	0	0	2
17	DF	England	27	Lewis Cass	0	1	0	0	0	1
–	MF	Ireland	20	Harry Charsley	1	0	0	0	0	1
–	FW	England	21	Devante Rodney	1	0	0	0	0	1
–	MF	England	17	Jake Taylor	0	0	0	1	0	1
–	MF	England	4	Brad Walker	1	0	0	0	0	1
–	–	–	–	Own goals	3	0	0	1	0	4
				TOTALS	66	8	1	9	5	88

=== Disciplinary record ===
Number	Nation	Position	Name	EFL League Two		FA Cup		EFL Cup		EFL Trophy		Play-offs		Total	
Number	Nation	Position	Name	Yellow card	Red card	Yellow card	Red card	Yellow card	Red card	Yellow card	Red card	Yellow card	Red card	Yellow card	Red card
1	Brazil	GK	Lucas Covolan	1	2	0	0	0	0	0	0	0	0	1	2
3	England	DF	Dan Jones	4	1	1	0	0	0	0	0	0	0	5	1
10	England	MF	Tom Conlon	3	1	0	0	0	0	0	0	0	0	3	1
4	England	MF	Brad Walker	11	0	0	0	1	0	1	0	0	0	13	0
2	England	DF	James Gibbons	6	0	1	0	0	0	0	0	0	0	7	0
6	England	DF	Nathan Smith	7	0	0	0	0	0	0	0	0	0	7	0
16	England	DF	Aaron Martin	5	0	0	0	0	0	0	0	0	0	5	0
7	England	MF	David Worrall	4	0	0	0	1	0	0	0	0	0	5	0
11	England	DF	Mal Benning	3	0	0	0	0	0	1	0	0	0	4	0
8	England	MF	Ben Garrity	4	0	0	0	0	0	0	0	0	0	4	0
23	England	MF	Tom Pett	3	0	0	0	0	0	0	0	1	0	4	0
13	England	FW	Jamie Proctor	4	0	0	0	0	0	0	0	0	0	4	0
26	England	GK	Aidan Stone	4	0	0	0	0	0	0	0	0	0	4	0
9	England	FW	James Wilson	3	0	0	0	0	0	0	0	1	0	4	0
20	Ireland	MF	Harry Charsley	2	0	0	0	0	0	0	0	1	0	3	0
24	England	FW	Kian Harratt	3	0	0	0	0	0	0	0	0	0	3	0
5	England	DF	Connor Hall	2	0	0	0	0	0	0	0	0	0	2	0
17	England	MF	Jake Taylor	1	0	0	0	0	0	1	0	0	0	2	0
19	England	MF	David Amoo	0	0	0	0	1	0	0	0	0	0	1	0
29	England	FW	Ryan Edmondson	1	0	0	0	0	0	0	0	0	0	1	0
15	Northern Ireland	DF	Ryan Johnson	1	0	0	0	0	0	0	0	0	0	1	0
20	England	FW	George Lloyd	1	0	0	0	0	0	0	0	0	0	1	0
22	Romania	MF	Dennis Politic	1	0	0	0	0	0	0	0	0	0	1	0
21	England	FW	Devante Rodney	1	0	0	0	0	0	0	0	0	0	1	0
			TOTALS	74	4	2	0	3	0	3	0	3	0	84	4

Sourced from Soccerway.

== Awards ==
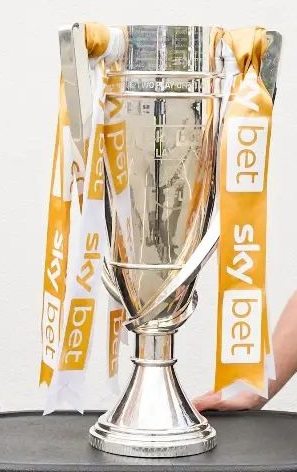
The 2022 EFL League Two play-off trophy

End of Season Awards	Winner
Player of the Year	Ben Garrity
Players' Player of the Year	Ben Garrity
Club Player of the Year	Tom Conlon
Goal of the Season	Jamie Proctor (vs Sutton United, 26 March 2022)
Top Goalscorer	Jamie Proctor (15)
Young Player of the Year	Aidan Stone
Youth Player of the Year	Tommy McDermott
Supporters' Club Player of the Year	Ben Garrity

== Transfers ==
=== Transfers in ===
Date from	Position	Nationality	Name	From	Fee	Ref.
4 June 2021	CM	ENG	Ben Garrity	Blackpool	Undisclosed	
1 July 2021 (Note: The transfer was announced on 28 June and would become official on 1 July once his contract at Mansfield Town expired)	LB	ENG	Mal Benning	Mansfield Town	Free transfer	
1 July 2021 (Note: The transfer was announced on 23 June and would become official on 1 July once his contract at Torquay United expired)	GK	BRA	Lucas Covolan	Torquay United	Free transfer	
1 July 2021 (Note: The transfer was announced on 27 June and would become official on 1 July once his contract at Hartlepool United expired)	CB	NIR	Ryan Johnson	Hartlepool United	Free transfer	
1 July 2021 (Note: The transfer was announced on 10 June and would become official on 1 July once his contract at Salford City expired)	LB	ENG	Dan Jones	Salford City	Free transfer	
1 July 2021 (Note: The transfer was announced on 9 June and would become official on 1 July once his contract at Hamilton Academical expired)	CB	ENG	Aaron Martin	(Scotland) Hamilton Academical	Free transfer	
1 July 2021 (Note: The transfer was announced on 29 June and would become official on 1 July once his contract at Stevenage expired)	LM	ENG	Tom Pett	Stevenage	Free transfer	
1 July 2021 (Note: The transfer was announced on 25 June and would become official on 1 July once his contract at Mansfield Town expired)	GK	ENG	Aidan Stone	Mansfield Town	Free transfer	
1 July 2021 (Note: The transfer was announced on 2 June and would become official on 1 July once his contract at Shrewsbury Town expired)	DM	ENG	Brad Walker	Shrewsbury Town	Free transfer	
1 July 2021 (Note: The transfer was announced on 7 June and would become official on 1 July once his contract at Salford City expired)	CF	ENG	James Wilson	Salford City	Free transfer	
5 July 2021	CF	ENG	Jamie Proctor	Rotherham United	Free transfer	
3 September 2021	LB	NIR	Danny Amos	Doncaster Rovers	Free transfer	
10 January 2022	LB	ENG	Chris Hussey	Cheltenham Town	Undisclosed	
11 January 2022	CB	ENG	Connor Hall	Harrogate Town	Undisclosed	
28 January 2022	CM	IRL	Harry Charsley	Mansfield Town	Undisclosed	
31 January 2022	RB	ENG	Sammy Robinson	Manchester City	Free transfer (Note: Manchester City retained a sell-on clause.)	

=== Transfers out ===
Date from	Position	Nationality	Name	To	Fee	Ref.
31 August 2021	CF	JAM	Theo Robinson	Bradford City	Mutual consent	
6 January 2022	CB	NIR	Ryan Johnson	Stockport County	Undisclosed	
7 January 2022	LB	NIR	Danny Amos	Grimsby Town	Released	
7 January 2022	CM	ENG	Danny Whitehead	AFC Fylde	Mutual consent	
11 January 2022	CB	ENG	Leon Legge	Harrogate Town	Undisclosed	
14 January 2022	CM	ENG	Scott Burgess	Grimsby Town	Mutual consent	
28 January 2022	RW	ENG	Devante Rodney	Walsall	Undisclosed	
21 June 2022	MF	ENG	Alex Hurst	York City	Undisclosed	
30 June 2022	LB	ENG	John Clarke	Reading U23	Free transfer	
22 June 2022	RB	ENG	James Gibbons	Bristol Rovers	Rejected contract	
30 June 2022	RW	ENG	David Amoo	Stevenage	Released	

=== Loans in ===
Date from	Position	Nationality	Name	From	Date until	Ref.
12 July 2021	CB	ENG	Lewis Cass	Newcastle United	27 January 2022 (Note: On 27 January, Cass returned back early to his parent club Newcastle after he was ruled out of the rest of the season.)	
16 August 2021	RW	ROM	Dennis Politic	Bolton Wanderers	17 January 2022 (Note: On 17 January, Politic was recalled back early by his parent club Bolton.)	
30 August 2021	CF	ENG	George Lloyd	Cheltenham Town	13 January 2022 (Note: On 13 January, Lloyd was recalled back early by his parent club Cheltenham.)	
4 January 2022	CF	ENG	Ryan Edmondson	Leeds United	End of season	
7 January 2022	CF	ENG	Kian Harratt	Huddersfield Town	End of season	
27 January 2022	LM	NIR	Joel Cooper	Oxford United	End of season	
27 January 2022	GK	CZE	Tomáš Holý	Ipswich Town	End of season	

=== Loans out ===
Date from	Position	Nationality	Name	From	Date until	Ref.
15 October 2021	CM	ENG	Danny Whitehead	Altrincham	24 December 2021	
12 March 2022	CF	ENG	Eden Bailey	Newcastle Town	24 April 2022	
19 March 2022	CM	ENG	Ellis Jones	Newcastle Town	24 April 2022	
19 March 2022	CM	ENG	Kamani McFarlane	Wythenshawe Amateurs	10 April 2022	
