= Aidan Stone =

English footballer (born 1999)

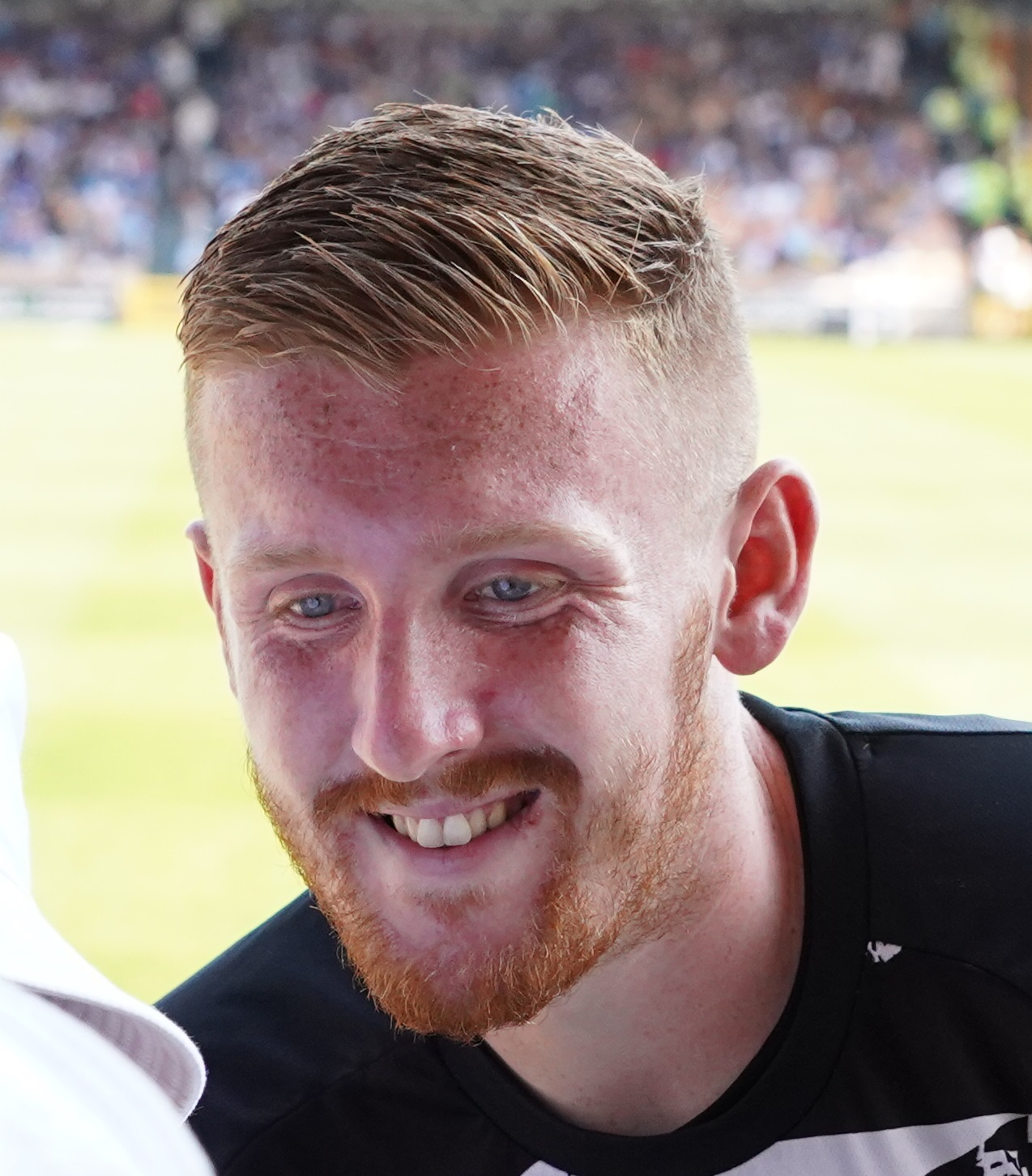
- Stone in August 2022.

Personal information
- Full name: Aidan Thomas Stone
- Date of birth: 20 July 1999 (age 27)
- Place of birth: Stafford, England
- Height: 6 ft 1 in (1.86 m)
- Position: Goalkeeper

Team information
- Current team: Truro City
- Number: 24

Senior career*
Years	Team	Apps	(Gls)
2015–2016	Sporting Khalsa		
2016–2017	Brocton		
2017–2019	Burnley	0	(0)
2018	→ Lancaster City (loan)	0	(0)
2019–2021	Mansfield Town	24	(0)
2019–2020	→ Widnes (loan)	5	(0)
2021–2023	Port Vale	38	(0)
2023–2025	Notts County	23	(0)
2024–2025	→ Boston United (loan)	13	(0)
2025	Yeovil Town	17	(0)
2025–	Truro City	33	(0)

International career
2017	England Schoolboys U18	6	(0)
- * Club domestic league appearances and goals as of 14:52, 26 April 2026 (UTC)

Aidan Thomas Stone (born 20 July 1999) is an English professional footballer who plays as a goalkeeper for National League South club Truro City.

Stone began his career at Sporting Khalsa and Brocton, before being signed by Burnley, from where he was loaned out to Lancaster City. He joined Mansfield Town in June 2019 and made his English Football League debut in February 2020. He signed with Port Vale in June 2021 and helped the club to win promotion out of League Two via the play-offs in 2022. He joined Notts County on a free transfer in June 2023. He was loaned to Boston United in September 2024 and transferred to Yeovil Town in February 2025. He signed with Truro City in August 2025.

== Early and personal life ==
Aidan Thomas Stone was born in Stafford on 20 July 1999. He grew up in Hednesford and attended Kingsmead School and Wolgarston High School. He is a Birmingham City supporter.

== Career ==
=== Early career ===
Stone played as a centre-half in his youth until he put on extra weight at the age of 14 and decided to concentrate on goalkeeping. He played for Sporting Khalsa. Having failed a three-month trial spell at Walsall at the age of 16, he joined Midland League side Brocton in February 2016, winning the club's young player and players' Player of the Year awards during the 2016–17 Premier Division relegation campaign. He won a total of six caps for the England Schoolboys U18s team in 2017, playing against Northern Ireland and Australia in England's victorious Centenary Shield campaign.

=== Burnley ===
Stone was signed by Burnley to a one-year contract with the option of a further 12 months in June 2017. He signed a new one-year contract in April 2018. He joined Lancaster City in July 2018 in a loan deal to run the first half of the 2018–19 season. He made one FA Trophy appearance at Lancaster. He played for Burnley U23s in the 2019 Lancashire Senior Cup final, which ended in a 2–0 defeat to Blackburn Rovers. He credited Nick Pope, Joe Hart and Tom Heaton for having a positive influence on his career, saying "it's nice to have them as colleagues but also as friends".

=== Mansfield Town ===
Stone signed for Mansfield Town on 24 June 2019 after impressing manager John Dempster on trial, and was expected to provide competition for first-choice goalkeeper Conrad Logan whilst Bobby Olejnik recovered from a knee injury. He made his senior debut at Field Mill on 27 August in a Football League Trophy game against Everton U21; the match finished 1–1 with Everton winning the resulting penalty shoot-out 4–1. On 1 December, he joined Northern Premier League Division One North West club Widnes on a one-month loan deal, having been recommended to the club by Mansfield's Head of Recruitment Andy Burgess. He played five games for the "Whites". In January 2020, Mansfield manager Graham Coughlan said he was hoping to give Stone some more first-team experience before the end of the 2019–20 season. He made his English Football League debut on 15 February, in a 1–0 home win over Newport County.

He made 24 appearances in the 2020–21 season and was praised by manager Nigel Clough in April for recovering from a costly error in a 1–1 draw with Newport County to pick up the man of the match award for his performance in a 1–0 win at Stevenage. The following month he was named as the club's Football in the Community's PFA Community Champion for his championing of a healthy eating campaign with Wynndale Primary School. However, the club confirmed that Stone would not be offered a new contract. Stone described the decision as "a bit of a shock" as "I thought I'd done enough to earn a new contract".

=== Port Vale ===
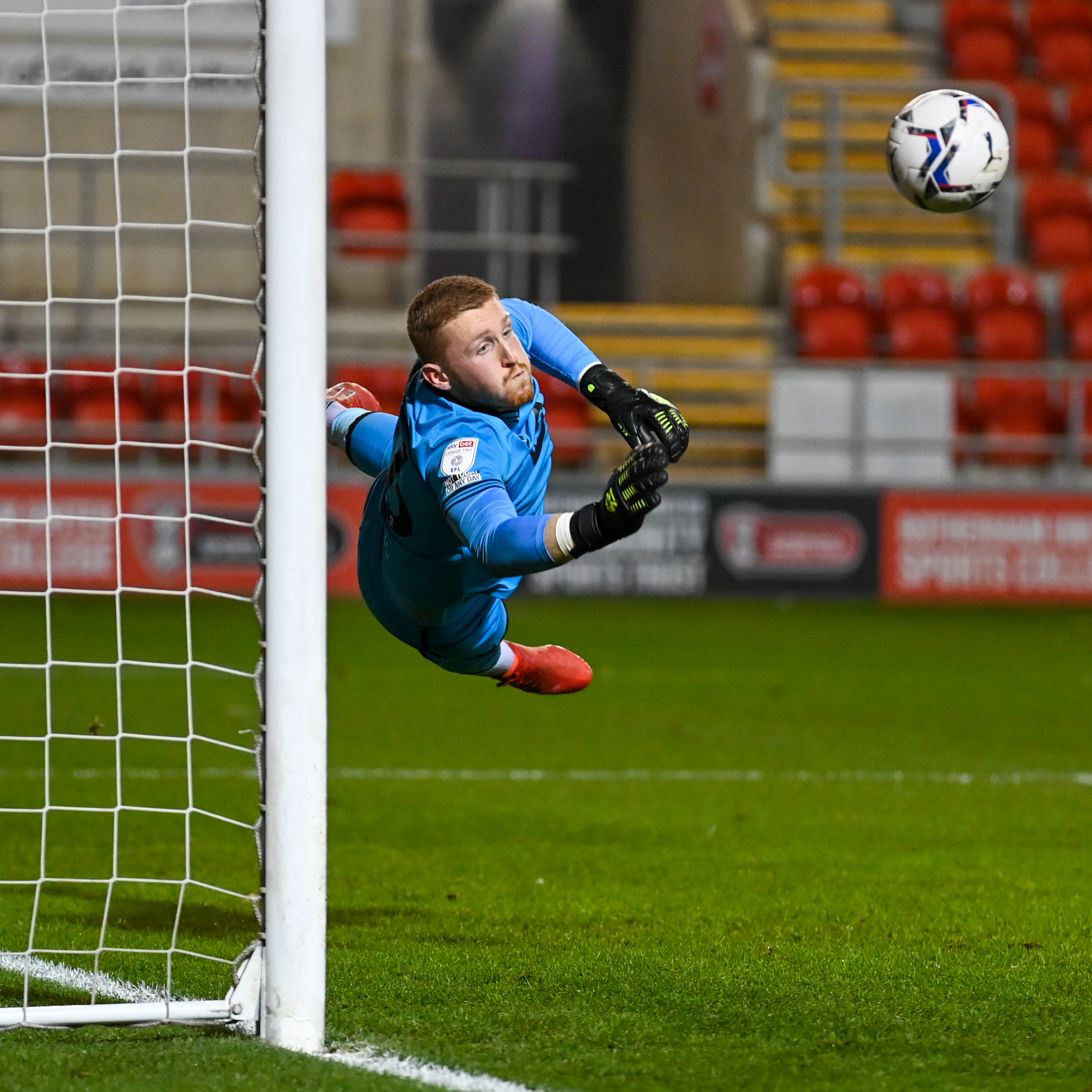
Stone in goal for Port Vale (November 2021)

On 25 June 2021, Port Vale announced that they had signed Stone on a one-year deal to start on 1 July, with the option of a further 12 months; manager Darrell Clarke said that "we are pleased to have secured Aidan's future at Vale Park and expect to have a healthy dose of competition now in the goalkeeping positions, following Lucas Covolan's arrival earlier in the week." He was given the chance to secure a starting place after Covolan was sent off on the opening day of the 2021–22 season. Covolan was returned to the starting eleven upon serving his suspension, only to be sent off yet again in January; Stone had to then sit on the bench behind new loan signing Tomáš Holý until giving an impressive performance upon being given his first league start in two months on 12 March. He remained in goal for the rest of the season and saved three penalties in the penalty shoot-out victory over Swindon Town in the play-off semi-final. He started in the play-off final at Wembley Stadium as Vale secured promotion with a 3–0 victory over Mansfield Town; Michael Baggaley of The Sentinel wrote that "[Stone had an] early mix up with Gibbons but retrieved the situation with a save from Murphy... spilled a ball into the area but Hall cleared off the line.... [Stone] has played a huge part in getting Vale this far". The club named him as Young Player of the Year and invoked their option to extend his contract by a further 12 months in June 2022. The club then gave Stone a new deal to run until 2024.

He lost his first-team spot to loan signing Jack Stevens early in the 2022–23 campaign, with Clarke claiming that further work with coach Carlo Nash would bring out Stone's potential as a "top half of League One goalie". Stevens remained first-choice goalkeeper for much of the campaign, though Stone was returned to the first XI in February, at which stage Clarke said that there was little to choose between the two. Stone ended the campaign with 26 appearances, twenty of which were in the league. He was permitted to leave the club on a free transfer after Port Vale signed Connor Ripley from Morecambe.

=== Notts County ===
On 23 June 2023, Stone signed a two-year deal with League Two club Notts County, where he would compete with Sam Slocombe for a first-team place. He was sent off on his debut for the club as County were beaten 5–1 at Sutton United on the opening day of the 2023–24 season; he had brought down Scott Kashket following a poor back-pass. He was transfer-listed at the end of the season by new head coach Stuart Maynard.

He started the 2024–25 season on the sidelines as new signing Alex Bass was preferred in goal. On 25 September, he joined Boston United in the National League on loan until January. On 30 January 2025, Stone mutually terminated his contract with Notts County to pursue opportunities closer to his family home in the south-west.

=== Yeovil Town ===
On 3 February 2025, Stone signed for National League side Yeovil Town. He said he wanted to help the club to regain their Football League status. Manager Mark Cooper said that Stone had settled in well at Huish Park. He played 17 games in what remained of the 2024–25 campaign. On 1 August 2025, Stone mutually terminated his contract with Yeovil Town.

=== Truro City ===
On 1 August 2025, Stone joined newly promoted National League club Truro City on a one-year deal with an option to extend. Assistant manager Stewart Yetton said that Stone had been playing "brilliantly" after replacing Dan Lavercombe in the first XI. He featured 37 times in the 2025–26 season, which ended in relegation. Despite the relegation, his contract was extended.

== Style of play ==
Stone has been described as a vocal goalkeeper with good distribution skills.

== Career statistics ==
As of end of 2025–26 season

Appearances and goals by club, season and competition
Club	Season	League			FA Cup		EFL Cup		Other		Total	
Club	Season	Division	Apps	Goals	Apps	Goals	Apps	Goals	Apps	Goals	Apps	Goals
Burnley	2018–19	Premier League	0	0	0	0	0	0	—		0	0
Lancaster City (loan)	2018–19	NPL Premier Division	0	0	0	0	—		1 (Note: Appearance in the FA Trophy.)	0	1	0
Mansfield Town	2019–20	League Two	3	0	0	0	0	0	1 (Note: Appearance(s) in the EFL Trophy.)	0	4	0
Mansfield Town	2020–21	League Two	21	0	1	0	0	0	2	0	24	0
Mansfield Town	Total		24	0	1	0	0	0	3	0	28	0
Widnes (loan)	2019–20	NPL Division One West	5	0	0	0	—		0	0	5	0
Port Vale	2021–22	League Two	18	0	2	0	1	0	7 (Note: 4 appearances in the EFL Trophy and 3 appearances in the play-offs)	0	28	0
Port Vale	2022–23	League One	20	0	1	0	1	0	4	0	26	0
Port Vale	Total		38	0	3	0	2	0	11	0	54	0
Notts County	2023–24	League Two	23	0	2	0	0	0	1	0	26	0
Notts County	2024–25	League Two	0	0	0	0	0	0	0	0	0	0
Notts County	Total		23	0	2	0	0	0	1	0	26	0
Boston United (loan)	2024–25	National League	13	0	0	0	—		4 (Note: Two appearances in the National League Cup, two appearances in the FA Trophy)	0	17	0
Yeovil Town	2024–25	National League	17	0	—		—		—		17	0
Truro City	2025–26	National League	33	0	0	0	—		4 (Note: Three appearances in the National League Cup, one appearance in the FA Trophy)	0	37	0
Truro City	2026–27	National League South	0	0	0	0	—		0	0	0	0
Truro City	Total		33	0	0	0	0	0	4	0	37	0
Career total			153	0	6	0	2	0	24	0	185	0

== Honours ==
Burnley

- Lancashire Senior Cup runner-up: 2019

Port Vale

- EFL League Two play-offs: 2022
