= 2023 EFL League Two play-off final =

Association football match

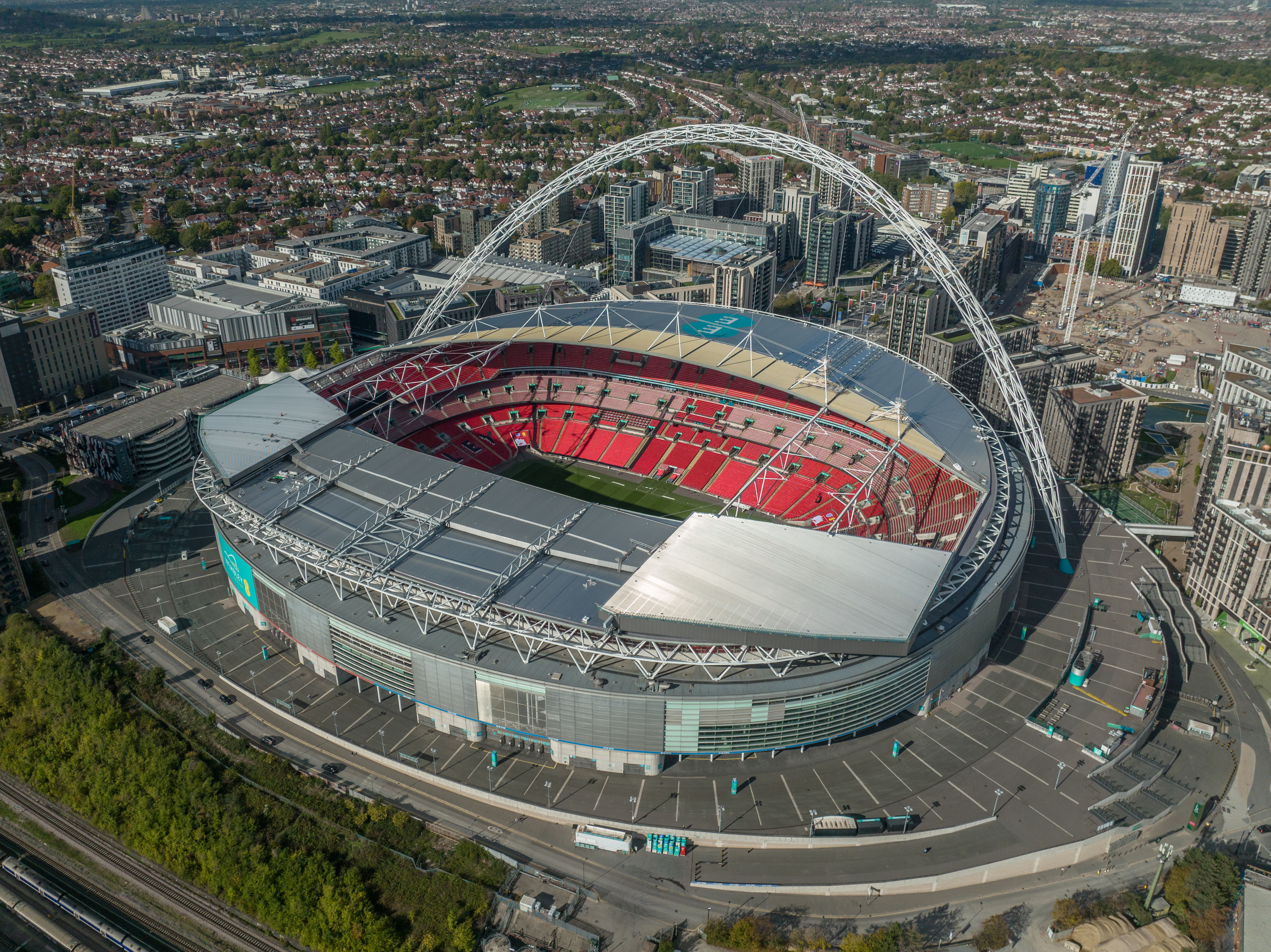
- Wembley Stadium in London hosted the final.
Stockport County	Carlisle United
1	1
- After extra time Carlisle United won 5–4 on penalties
- Date: 28 May 2023
- Venue: Wembley Stadium, London
- Referee: Tom Nield
- Attendance: 34,004

The 2023 EFL League Two play-off final was an association football match that took place on 28 May 2023 at Wembley Stadium, London, between Stockport County and Carlisle United. The match determined the fourth and final team to gain promotion from EFL League Two, the fourth tier of English football, to EFL League One. The top three teams of the 2022–23 EFL League Two, Leyton Orient, Stevenage and Northampton Town, gained automatic promotion to League One, while the clubs placed from fourth to seventh in the table took part in the 2023 English Football League play-offs. The winners of the play-off semi-finals competed for the final promotion place for the 2023–24 season in League One.

Tom Nield was the referee for the match, which was played in front of 34,004 spectators. Stockport took the lead through an own goal in the first half when Carlisle's Jon Mellish deflected a cross over his own goalkeeper. They held the lead until the 84th minute but Carlisle then scored an equaliser when Omari Patrick hit a low shot into Stockport's goal. The game finished 1–1 after 90 minutes and went to extra time. There were no further goals in the additional period so the match was decided by a penalty shoot-out. Carlisle scored all of their penalties, but Stockport missed their second when Carlisle's goalkeeper Tomáš Holý saved Ryan Rydel's shot. This gave Carlisle a 5–4 shoot-out win and promotion to League One.

== Route to the final ==
EFL League Two final table, leading positions
Pos	Team	Pld	W	D	L	GF	GA	GD	Pts
1	Leyton Orient (C, P)	46	26	13	7	61	34	+27	91
2	Stevenage (P)	46	24	13	9	61	39	+22	85
3	Northampton Town (P)	46	23	14	9	62	42	+20	83
4	Stockport County	46	22	13	11	65	37	+28	79
5	Carlisle United (O, P)	46	20	16	10	66	43	+23	76
6	Bradford City	46	20	16	10	61	43	+18	76
7	Salford City	46	22	9	15	72	54	+18	75

Source: EFL Official Website
(C) Champions; (O) Play-off winners; (P) Promoted

Stockport County finished the regular 2022–23 season in fourth place in EFL League Two, the fourth tier of the English football league system, one place and three points ahead of Carlisle United. Both therefore missed out on the three automatic places for promotion to EFL League One and instead took part in the play-offs to determine the fourth promoted team. Stockport finished four points behind Northampton Town (who were promoted in third place), six behind second-placed Stevenage and twelve points behind league winners Leyton Orient. Stockport secured at least a play-off place after beating Leyton Orient in their penultimate game, retaining the possibility of automatic promotion until the season's final day. Carlisle secured a play-off berth on the final day with a draw against Sutton United, finishing the season in fifth place, three points behind Stockport.

Stockport faced seventh-placed Salford City in their play-off semi-final with the first match of the two-legged tie being held at Moor Lane in Salford on 13 May 2023. Matt Smith gave the home side the lead in the first half, when he headed the ball into the Stockport goal following a cross by Elliot Watt. They had a chance to double their lead on 71 minutes, when Conor McAleny shot from within the penalty area, but Ben Hinchliffe, the Stockport goalkeeper, dived to save it and the match ended 1–0. The second leg took place a week later at Edgeley Park in Stockport. Salford had several opportunities to extend their aggregate lead in the first half, but it was Stockport who scored first, when Isaac Olaofe headed into the corner of the goal from Ryan Rydel's cross. With the aggregate score level, the game went to extra time, in which Stevie Mallan restored Salford's overall lead with a deflected shot. Jack Stretton scored for Stockport three minutes later, however, giving Stockport a 2–1 match win, but leaving the tie level 2–2 on aggregate. In the ensuing penalty shoot-out, Salford failed to score three of the four penalties they took, two of them being saved by Hinchliffe, and it was Stockport who progressed, winning the shootout 3–1.

In the other play-off semi-final, Carlisle faced Bradford City and the first leg was played on 14 May 2023 at Valley Parade in Bradford. Eighteen minutes into the game, Jamie Walker gave the home side the lead, firing the bouncing ball underneath Carlisle goalkeeper Tomáš Holý following a pass from Scott Banks. Carlisle had some chances to equalise, but that proved the only goal and the match ended 1–0 to Bradford. The return leg took place at Brunton Park, Carlisle, four days later. Midway through the first half, Owen Moxon fired a shot at goal which was saved by Bradford goalkeeper Harry Lewis. The ball rebounded and was chased by Carlisle's John-Kymani Gordon and Bradford's Brad Halliday; the ball ended up in the goal, with Halliday credited with an own goal having touched the ball last. No additional goals were scored in normal time, so with the aggregate score level at 1–1, the game went to extra time. In the first half of extra time, Carlisle scored again to take the lead in the tie, when Callum Guy hit a bouncing half volley past Lewis. Bradford levelled the tie again when Matt Derbyshire scored following a run down the right wing by Banks, but Ben Barclay scored midway through the second period to seal a 3–1 win for Carlisle on the night, the 3–2 aggregate score taking them to the final.

== Match ==
=== Background ===
The two finalists played each other twice during the regular season, with Stockport winning their home fixture 2–0 in October 2022 and a 2–2 draw in the reverse fixture at Brunton Park in April 2023, three games before the end of the season. Kristian Dennis was the highest scorer for Carlisle with 20 league goals during the season while Kyle Wootton was Stockport's top marksman with 14 goals during the league campaign.

Carlisle manager Paul Simpson urged his players to enjoy the occasion, recalling his own experience playing at Wembley, when he "got so nervous about the day that [he] couldn’t enjoy it". He also noted the logistical difficulties for players and supporters in travelling from Carlisle to London, but noted that the game was a "fantastic" one to be involved with. Simpson had previously managed Stockport himself, and his son Jake was part of the Stockport coaching team for the final. Simpson's counterpart Dave Challinor expressed confidence in his team's ability to achieve a second consecutive promotion, noting that Stockport were "in a really strong situation, the fact we have got two players in Antoni Sarcevic and Chris Hussey that have played in a play-off final, so in terms of that, they can pass on completely different feelings and emotions, and we need to use those experiences in a positive way".

The referee for the match was Tom Nield, who had officiated Stockport once during the season, in their play-off semi-final first leg, but had not been involved in any Carlisle games. The assistant referees were Alex James and Hristo Karaivanov with Darren Williams as a reserve, and the fourth official was Simon Mather. Neil Swarbrick and Derek Eaton were named as the video assistant referee and assistant video assistant referee respectively.

The match was televised live by Sky Sports on its Football channel and was also available for live streaming on Sky Go and NOW. BBC Local Radio stations covered the game for each team: BBC Radio Cumbria for Carlisle United and BBC Radio Manchester for Stockport County.

=== Summary ===
The match kicked off at 1:30 p.m. in front of a crowd 34,004. John Ashdown of The Guardian reported that Stockport had been the better side in the opening half hour, but with neither side having any serious goal opportunities. Stockport took the lead on 34 minutes through an own goal, when Olaofe's cross from the right-hand side bounced off Jon Mellish's shin and over the top of the goalkeeper into the Carlisle net. Carlisle had a chance to equalise just before half time when Joel Senior broke free from the halfway line and attempted to set up Gordon with an open goal, but Stockport defender Akil Wright was able to block the cross.

Twelve minutes into the second half, Stockport had a major opportunity to extend their lead. Hussey sent a free kick into the penalty area where it was received by Wright in space in front of the centre of the goal. Wright headed the ball towards goal but his shot went wide, former Stockport defender Liam Hogan telling the BBC at the time that he "should be scoring there". On 71 minutes, Stockport's Myles Hippolyte made a strong challenge on Corey Whelan, which Ashdown felt merited action from VAR, but there was no free kick given. Carlisle made several substitutions in their attempt to score an equaliser as the game neared its end, and they thought they had won a penalty for handball when Kyle Knoyle cleared a Mellish shot off the line on 83 minutes, but after a VAR check it was not given. They did find the equaliser one minute later, however, when Omari Patrick hit a low shot into the goal from 15 yards (14 m) out. The game finished 1–1 at the end of 90 minutes, and went into extra time.

The first period of extra time had few chances on goal, while in the second period, there was one chance for each side – Stockport's Stretton (who had also played for Carlisle on loan earlier in the season) saw a shot saved by Carlisle goalkeeper Holý, while Dennis's shot for Carlisle was saved by Stockport's Hinchliffe. There were no further goals and the match was to be decided by a penalty shoot-out. In the shoot-out, the first kick for each side was scored, but then Stockport's Rydel saw his kick saved by Holý, who dived to his right. Ashdown described this as "not a great penalty". Mellish then scored his penalty for Carlisle to give them a 2–1 lead after two kicks each. The subsequent two kicks for each side were successful, as was Stockport's final penalty which was scored by Will Collar. Carlisle's final kick was then scored by Taylor Charters to complete a 5–4 shoot-out win and send the Cumbrian team into League One for the 2023–24 season.

=== Details ===
28 May 2023
13:30 BST

Stockport County	1–1 (a.e.t.)	Carlisle United
Mellish 34' (o.g.)	Report	Patrick 84'
Penalties
Lemonheigh-Evans (penalty scored); Rydel (penalty missed); Hippolyte (penalty scored); Stretton (penalty scored); Collar (penalty scored)	4–5	(penalty scored) Dennis; (penalty scored) Mellish; (penalty scored) Edmondson; (penalty scored) Moxon; (penalty scored) Charters

Wembley Stadium, London
Attendance: 34,004
Referee: Tom Nield

GK	1	(England) Ben Hinchliffe
CB	4	(England) Akil Wright	(substituted off) 69'
CB	6	(England) Fraser Horsfall
CB	23	(England) Chris Hussey
RM	3	(England) Kyle Knoyle
CM	8	(Northern Ireland) Callum Camps	(substituted off) 85'
CM	18	(England) Ryan Croasdale
CM	10	(England) Antoni Sarcevic	(substituted off) 114'
LM	17	(England) Ryan Rydel
CF	20	(England) Isaac Olaofe	(substituted off) 82'
CF	9	(Republic of Ireland) Paddy Madden	(substituted off) 69'
Substitutes:
GK	25	(Czech Republic) Vítězslav Jaroš
DF	5	(Republic of Ireland) Neill Byrne	(substituted on) 85'
DF	31	(Wales) Joe Lewis
MF	7	(Wales) Connor Lemonheigh-Evans	(substituted on) 114'
MF	14	(England) Will Collar	(substituted on) 69' (yellow card) 105+2'
MF	21	(Grenada) Myles Hippolyte	(substituted on) 69'
FW	16	(Scotland) Jack Stretton	(substituted on) 82'
Head Coach:
(England) Dave Challinor

GK	1	(Czech Republic) Tomáš Holý
CB	17	(Republic of Ireland) Corey Whelan
CB	6	(England) Paul Huntington
CB	22	(England) Jon Mellish	(yellow card) 24' (goal) 34' (o.g.)
RM	2	(England) Joel Senior
CM	8	(England) Callum Guy	(substituted off) 78'
CM	4	(England) Owen Moxon
LM	3	(Scotland) Jack Armer	(substituted off) 82'
AM	35	(Northern Ireland) Alfie McCalmont	(substituted off) 61'
CF	36	(England) John-Kymani Gordon	(substituted off) 78'
CF	41	(England) Joe Garner	(substituted off) 61'
Substitutes:
GK	30	(Republic of Ireland) Michael Kelly
DF	33	(England) Jack Robinson
MF	15	(England) Taylor Charters	(substituted on) 78' (yellow card) 90+2'
FW	7	(England) Jordan Gibson	(substituted on) 78'
FW	9	(England) Ryan Edmondson	(substituted on) 61'
FW	10	(England) Omari Patrick	(substituted on) 61' (goal) 84'
FW	14	(England) Kristian Dennis	(substituted on) 82'
Head Coach:
(England) Paul Simpson

Statistics
	Stockport County F.C.	Carlisle United F.C.
Possession	50%	50%
Goals scored	1	1
Shots on target	1	4
Shots off target	15	6
Fouls committed	14	19
Corner kicks	5	5
Yellow cards	1	2
Red cards	0	0

== Post-match ==
After the game, Simpson described Carlisle's promotion as a "massive achievement", commenting that "things like this don't come easy", especially as he felt that the club's players had been written off at the beginning of the season. He praised Stockport and his opposite number, stating that they had a "really strong plan in place" and reasons to be optimistic. Reflecting on his team's defeat, Challinor said: "we've had the emotions of a penalty shoot-out win and loss within the space of a week. But these experiences, we have to use them and learn from them to turn them into a positive."

Carlisle's stay in League One was limited to one season, as they were relegated back to League Two at the end of the 2023–24 season. Simpson left the club in September 2024 after a poor start to the season, and the club were relegated again in 2024–25, dropping to the National League. Stockport went on to become League Two champions in 2023–24, earning promotion to League One a year after they missed out at Wembley. In 2024–25, their first season in that division, they finished in third place, earning a place in the play-offs for promotion to the EFL Championship, although they were eliminated at the semi-final stage.
