= Ellis Jones (footballer, born 2003) =

English footballer

Personal information
- Full name: Ellis Raymond Jones
- Date of birth: 4 December 2003 (age 22)
- Place of birth: Wednesbury, England
- Positions: Midfielder; centre-back

Team information
- Current team: Flint City Bucks

Youth career
- Port Vale

College career
Years	Team	Apps	(Gls)
2023	Oklahoma Christian Eagles	15	(5)
2024–	Wisconsin Badgers	13	(1)

Senior career*
Years	Team	Apps	(Gls)
2021–2022	Port Vale	0	(0)
2022	→ Newcastle Town (loan)	5	(0)
2022–2023	Alvechurch	3	(0)
2024–2025	FC Tucson	18	(1)
2025–	Flint City Bucks		
- * Club domestic league appearances and goals as of 13 December 2024

Ellis Raymond Jones (born 4 December 2003) is an English footballer who plays as a midfielder for USL League Two club Flint City Bucks and college soccer for the Wisconsin Badgers.

Jones began his career at Port Vale and played on loan at Newcastle Town. He then joined American college side Oklahoma Christian Eagles before transferring to the University of Wisconsin. During this time in college he also played for FC Tucson and the Flint City Bucks.

== Career ==
=== Port Vale ===
Jones made his first-team debut for Port Vale at the age of 17 whilst still a second-year youth team scholar, coming on as a half-time substitute for Brad Walker in a 1–0 win over Rochdale in an EFL Trophy group stage game at Vale Park on 5 October 2021. manager Darrell Clarke said that he had done well in the game and that "he earned it [his debut], I don't give them out for the sake of it. Some clubs do but I don't agree with that". He was then played in central defence by youth-team Coach Billy Paynter "to help him develop with more time on the ball", and was also given the captain's armband in youth-team games. On 19 March 2022, Jones joined Northern Premier League Division One West side Newcastle Town on loan. He played a total of five games for Newcastle. He was not offered a professional contract when his youth-team contract expired in June 2022.

=== Alvechurch ===
Jones signed with Southern League Premier Division Central club Alvechurch, making three starts and four substitute appearances during the 2022–23 season.

=== United States ===
Jones travelled to the United States and joined the Oklahoma Christian Eagles and Lady Eagles whilst studying Business at Oklahoma Christian University. He was named the Lone Star Conference Freshman of the Year, First Team All-Conference, and All-Freshman team and became the first Oklahoma Christian men's soccer player to earn First Team All-South Central Region honours at the Division II level. He joined FC Tucson of USL League Two in May 2024. On 4 January 2025, he transferred to the Flint City Bucks. He was re-signed as team captain in February 2026.

== Style of play ==
Jones is a central midfielder, though can also play at centre-back.

== Career statistics ==
As of match played 23 April 2022

Appearances and goals by club, season and competition
Club	Season	League			FA Cup		EFL Cup		Other		Total	
Club	Season	Division	Apps	Goals	Apps	Goals	Apps	Goals	Apps	Goals	Apps	Goals
Port Vale	2021–22	EFL League Two	0	0	0	0	0	0	1 (Note: Appearance(s) in the EFL Trophy.)	0	1	0
Newcastle Town (loan)	2021–22	Northern Premier League; Division One West	5	0	0	0	0	0	0	0	5	0
Alvechurch	2022–23	Southern League; Premier Division Central	3	0	1	0	0	0	3	0	7	0
Career total			8	0	1	0	0	0	4	0	13	0
