= Tomáš Holý =

Czech footballer

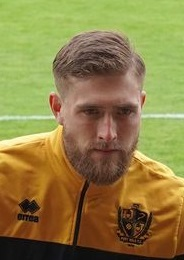
- Holý in May 2022

Personal information
- Full name: Tomáš Holý
- Date of birth: 10 December 1991 (age 34)
- Place of birth: Rychnov nad Kněžnou, Czechoslovakia
- Height: 2.06 m (6 ft 9 in)
- Position: Goalkeeper

Team information
- Current team: Viagem Ústí nad Labem

Youth career
- 2006–2010: Hradec Králové
- 2010–2011: Sparta Prague

Senior career*
Years	Team	Apps	(Gls)
2011–2017	Sparta Prague B	12	(0)
2013–2014	→ Vlašim (loan)	9	(0)
2014–2015	→ Viktoria Žižkov (loan)	41	(0)
2015–2017	→ Fastav Zlín (loan)	20	(0)
2017–2019	Gillingham	97	(0)
2019–2022	Ipswich Town	57	(0)
2021	→ Cambridge United (loan)	2	(0)
2022	→ Port Vale (loan)	9	(0)
2022–2024	Carlisle United	63	(0)
2024–2025	Baník Most-Souš	24	(0)
2025–2026	Artis Brno	16	(0)
2026–	Viagem Ústí nad Labem	0	(0)

International career
2006–2007	Czech Republic U16	3	(0)
2007–2008	Czech Republic U17	3	(0)
2008–2009	Czech Republic U18	6	(0)
- * Club domestic league appearances and goals as of 24 May 2026

Tomáš Holý (Czech pronunciation: [ˈtomaːʃ ˈɦoliː]; born 10 December 1991) is a Czech professional footballer who plays as a goalkeeper for Czech National Football League club Viagem Ústí nad Labem.

Holý started his professional career at Sparta Prague, having previously been part of the Hradec Králové youth system. He featured for Sparta Prague's reserve team Sparta Prague B during the 2010–11 and 2011–12 seasons. During his time with Sparta Prague, he spent time out on loan at Vlašim, Viktoria Žižkov and Fastav Zlín. In January 2017, Holý moved to English football to join Gillingham. He spent two and a half seasons at Gillingham, making over 100 appearances before joining Ipswich Town on a free transfer in June 2019. He was the club's first-choice goalkeeper for most of his first two seasons at the club but was dropped for the 2021–22 campaign and instead spent time on loan at Cambridge United and Port Vale. He joined Carlisle United on a free transfer in June 2022 and helped the club to win the EFL League Two play-offs in 2023. He returned to the Czech Republic to play for Baník Most-Souš the following year and signed with Artis Brno for the 2025–26 season and Viagem Ústí nad Labem the season after.

He has won youth-level caps for the Czech Republic at U16, U17 and U18 levels.

== Club career ==
=== Sparta Prague ===
Born in Rychnov nad Kněžnou, Czechoslovakia, Holý signed for the Czech side Sparta Prague in 2010, at the age of 18, having previously been with Hradec Králové since the age of 14. He made his career league debut for Sparta Prague B on 11 June 2011 in a Czech 2. Liga 2–1 home loss against FK Varnsdorf. He made 11 appearances during the 2011–12 season.

Holý joined Vlašim on loan in July 2013, with head coach Michal Horňák needing a replacement for the departing Michal Toma, whose excellent performances had helped to the keep the club from being relegated out of the Czech Národní Liga the previous season. He played nine Czech Národní Liga matches in the 2013–14 season before he was loaned out to divisional rivals Viktoria Žižkov. Speaking in June 2014, Viktoria Žižkov head coach Jindřich Trpišovský said that he was pleased with Holý's performances until he was sidelined with injury, which left David Pokorný to take over for the rest of the campaign. Holý returned to Žižkov for the 2014–15 season, featuring in another 28 games as Viktoria posted a fourth-place finish.

Holý joined Fastav Zlín on loan in July 2015. He made his debut for Zlín in the Czech First League – the top level of the Czech football league system – in a 1–0 win at Bohemians 1905 on 26 July, in what was a quiet game for the goalkeeper. He kept clean sheets in his next two appearances, though the 2–0 home win over Baník Ostrava proved a lot more eventful as visiting fans rushed the field at the Letná Stadion to attack Holý with improvised weaponry; Ostrava coach Radomír Korytář blamed Holý for provoking the supporters by colliding with striker Marek Šichor. Zlín head coach Bohumil Páník was forced to play Stanislav Dostál in goal for the matches against Sparta Prague, though Holý joked that he had hoped his parent club would not notice if he played against them as he had not been to the Stadion Letná in two years. Holý would, however, lose his first-team place anyway after conceding two goals from unforced errors in a 4–2 defeat at Viktoria Plzeň on 17 October. He played 20 games in the 2015–16 season, helping Zlín to finish two places above the relegation zone. He was offered a deal to play in the Georgian capital Tbilisi, but instead opted to try and secure a club in England.

Holý playing for Gillingham in 2018

=== Gillingham ===
Holý signed a two-and-a-half-year contract with EFL League One side Gillingham on 20 January 2017. Commenting on the signing, head coach Adrian Pennock said: "He is a good size, a good presence, he kicks it well, handles it well and it is good competition for Stuart Nelson, that’s what we need". Holý had initially been invited to trial with the "Gills" by Pennock's predecessor Justin Edinburgh, but managed to impress Pennock sufficiently to win a contract. He made his debut at Priestfield Stadium on 25 March, in a 1–0 defeat to Peterborough United; Pennock said that his performance showed confidence and that he was blameless for the goal. Holý went on to make six appearances during the second half of the 2016–17 season, and was defended by Pennock after gifting Milton Keynes Dons a winning goal when he missed the ball in an attempted punch.

He recovered from a blunder in a pre-season friendly to establish himself as the first-choice keeper for the 2017–18 season. He made a shaky start to the campaign. Still, he would finish it in impressive form, making 49 appearances in all competitions and keeping 10 clean sheets. He kept his place for the 2018–19 season, making 52 appearances throughout the season, keeping 15 clean sheets. Manager Steve Lovell instructed him to take more command of his penalty area and was pleased with the Czech's subsequent improvement. Holý was offered a new contract by Gillingham after refusing to enter negotiations until safety from relegation was confirmed, though he ultimately declined the offer anyway. Chairman Paul Scally had previously admitted that only promotion into the Championship could change Holý's mind.

=== Ipswich Town ===
On 24 May 2019, Holý agreed to join Ipswich Town on a two-year deal upon the expiry of his Gills contract. He was given the number 1 shirt upon joining the club. Holý made his debut for the "Blues" on 3 August, keeping a clean sheet in a 1–0 away win over Burton Albion, on the opening day of the 2019–20 season. He kept six clean sheets in the first ten league games of the season, including a run of five consecutive clean sheets in the league, equalling a club record. On 26 November, Holý saved a penalty in a 0–0 home draw with Wycombe Wanderers at Portman Road. He competed with on-loan goalkeeper Will Norris for a starting place in the team during the season, making 25 appearances in all competitions and keeping 10 clean sheets. Manager Paul Lambert said that he had "two top goalkeepers in top form" as he switched between the two goalkeepers 18 times between games.

Ipswich took up the option to extend Holý's contract by an additional year in July 2020, keeping him at the club until 2022. He was named in the League One team of the week for his performance in a 2–0 win against Accrington Stanley in October 2020. He faced competition from David Cornell for a starting place, with Cornell going on to play ten league games. Holý kept 17 clean sheets in 37 appearances, helping Ipswich to a ninth-place finish, and finished as runner-up to James Wilson in the club's Player of the Year vote.

On 26 October 2021, having failed to make a league appearance that season up until that point, Holý joined fellow League One club Cambridge United on an emergency week-long loan. He joined the U's to cover for the concussed Dimitar Mitov and "Blues" boss Paul Cook felt that the opportunity would do Holý good. He featured twice for Cambridge, conceding just the one goal. However, speaking in the January transfer window, new Ipswich manager Kieran McKenna hinted that Holý would leave the club in the summer as he had fallen behind Christian Walton and countryman Václav Hladký in the pecking order.

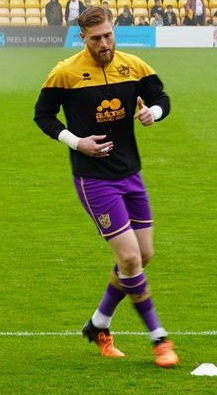
Holý warming up at Vale Park in May 2022

On 27 January 2022, Holý joined League Two side Port Vale on loan for the remainder of the 2021–22 season. Port Vale manager Darrell Clarke had felt that previous incumbent Lucas Covolan had "let his team mates down" by being sent off for a second time in the season. Holý played nine games for the "Valiants" until being dropped in favour of Aidan Stone. On 5 May 2022, Ipswich confirmed that Holý would leave the club upon his contract's expiration. He made 65 appearances in all competitions during his three-year spell with the club.

=== Carlisle United ===
On 9 June 2022, Holý agreed to join League Two side Carlisle United on a two-year deal after manager Paul Simpson released reigning Player of the Year Mark Howard. He was an ever-present throughout the 2022–23 campaign, with Michael Kelly playing in EFL Trophy games. Carlisle secured promotion via the play-offs with victory over Stockport County at Wembley Stadium; they won 5–4 on penalties following a 1–1 draw after extra time, with Holý saving Ryan Rydel's penalty kick.

Although Holý made the winning save in the Play-off final, his overall statistics placed him as the lowest performing goalkeeper in the 2022–23 season. He finished the campaign with -7.01 goals prevented, the lowest of any goalkeeper that season in any of England's top-four leagues.

Holý's poor form continued into the 2023–24 season, as he made crucial mistakes in consecutive matches against Blackpool, Northampton Town and Cheltenham Town. He found himself replaced by new signing Harry Lewis following the January transfer window. This appearance against Cheltenham Town proved to be his last for the club, and he was released at the end of the season following relegation.

=== Return to Czech Republic ===
On 4 October 2024, Holý signed a contract with Bohemian Football League club FK Baník Most-Souš. He played 24 league games in the 2024–25 season.

On 17 June 2025, Holý signed a contract with Czech National Football League club Artis Brno. He played 18 matches in the 2025–26 campaign. He left the club at the end of the season, having achieved a Goalkeeper of the Month award.

On 25 June 2026, Holý signed a two-year contract with Czech National Football League club Viagem Ústí nad Labem.

== International career ==
Holý has been capped by the Czech Republic at U16, U17 and U18 levels.

== Style of play ==
One of the tallest players in world football at 6 ft 9 in (2.06 m), Holý is a commanding goalkeeper with good shot-stopping and kicking abilities. His height gives him a natural advantage in covering the goal, collecting crosses, and distributing the ball long distances.

== Personal life ==
Holý has been noted for his "positive" and "infectious" personality. Cambridge United manager Mark Bonner described him as a "brilliant character". His uncle, Ondrej Volšík, works as a football coach after also playing for Hradec Králové's youth team as a goalkeeper.

== Career statistics ==
As of match played 27 May 2026

Appearances and goals by club, season and competition
Club	Season	League			National cup (Note: Includes Czech Cup, FA Cup)		League cup (Note: Includes EFL Cup)		Other		Total	
Club	Season	Division	Apps	Goals	Apps	Goals	Apps	Goals	Apps	Goals	Apps	Goals
Sparta Prague B	2010–11	Czech 2. Liga	1	0	0	0	—		0	0	1	0
Sparta Prague B	2011–12	Czech 2. Liga	11	0	0	0	—		0	0	11	0
Sparta Prague B	2012–13	Czech 2. Liga	0	0	0	0	—		0	0	0	0
Sparta Prague B	Total		12	0	0	0	0	0	0	0	12	0
Vlašim (loan)	2013–14	Czech Národní Liga	9	0	0	0	—		0	0	9	0
Viktoria Žižkov (loan)	2013–14	Czech Národní Liga	14	0	0	0	—		0	0	14	0
Viktoria Žižkov (loan)	2014–15	Czech Národní Liga	27	0	1	0	—		0	0	28	0
Viktoria Žižkov (loan)	Total		41	0	1	0	0	0	0	0	42	0
Fastav Zlín (loan)	2015–16	Czech First League	20	0	0	0	—		0	0	20	0
Fastav Zlín (loan)	2016–17	Czech First League	0	0	1	0	—		0	0	1	0
Fastav Zlín (loan)	Total		20	0	1	0	0	0	0	0	21	0
Gillingham	2016–17	League One	6	0	—		—		—		6	0
Gillingham	2017–18	League One	45	0	3	0	1	0	0	0	49	0
Gillingham	2018–19	League One	46	0	5	0	1	0	0	0	52	0
Gillingham	Total		97	0	8	0	2	0	0	0	107	0
Ipswich Town	2019–20	League One	21	0	2	0	0	0	2 (Note: Appearance(s) in EFL Trophy)	0	25	0
Ipswich Town	2020–21	League One	36	0	0	0	1	0	0	0	37	0
Ipswich Town	2021–22	League One	0	0	0	0	1	0	2	0	3	0
Ipswich Town	Total		57	0	2	0	2	0	4	0	65	0
Cambridge United (loan)	2021–22	League One	2	0	0	0	—		0	0	2	0
Port Vale (loan)	2021–22	League Two	9	0	—		—		—		9	0
Carlisle United	2022–23	League Two	46	0	2	0	1	0	3 (Note: Appearance(s) in play-offs)	0	52	0
Carlisle United	2023–24	League One	17	0	1	0	1	0	2	0	21	0
Carlisle United	Total		63	0	3	0	2	0	5	0	73	0
Baník Most-Souš	2024–25	Bohemian League	24	0	0	0	—		0	0	24	0
Artis Brno	2025–26	Czech National League	16	0	2	0	—		0	0	18	0
Viagem Ústí nad Labem	2026–27	Czech National League	0	0	0	0	—		0	0	0	0
Career total			350	0	17	0	6	0	9	0	382	0

== Honours ==
Carlisle United

- EFL League Two play-offs: 2023
