= Kian Harratt =

English footballer (born 2002)

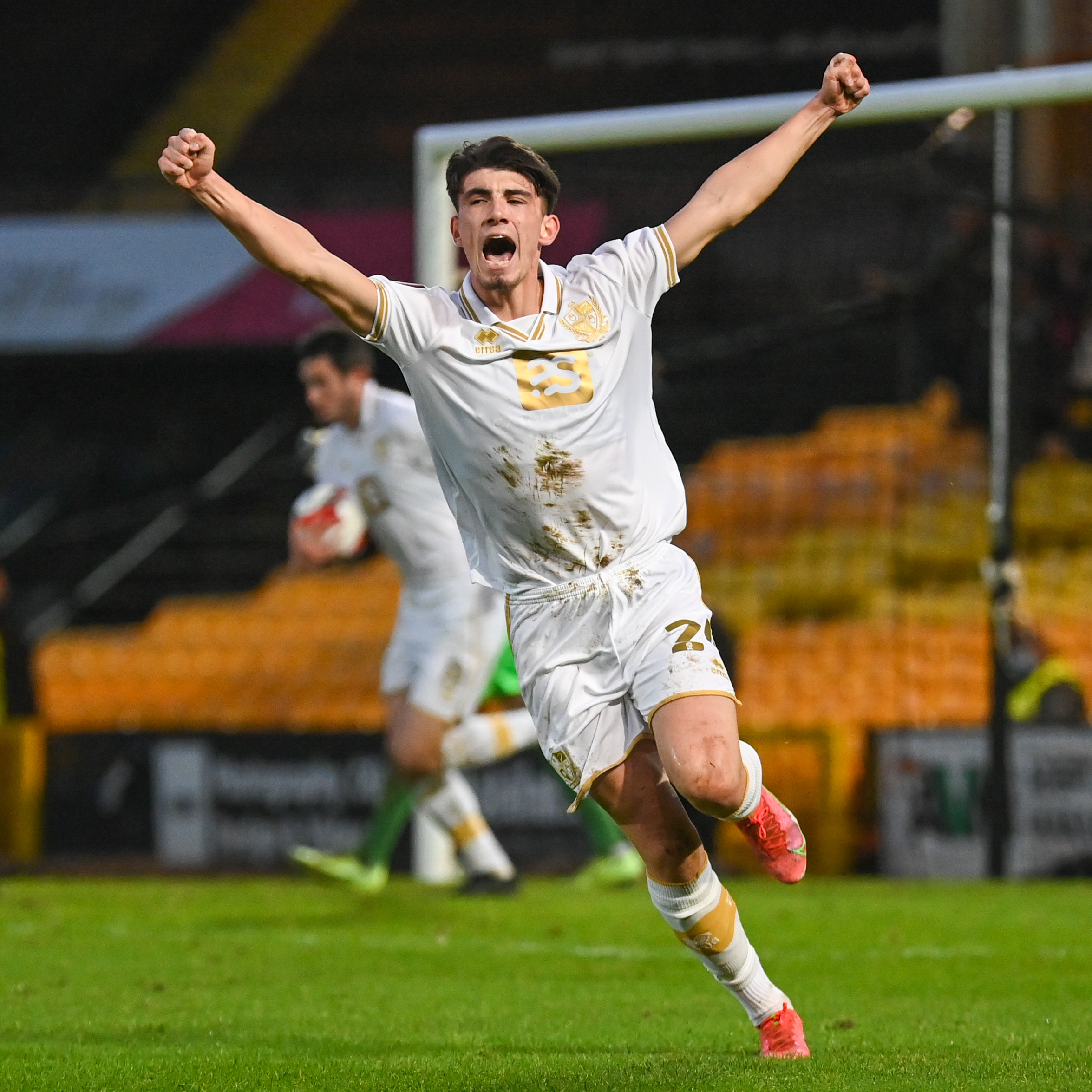
- Harratt celebrates his first professional goal in 2022

Personal information
- Full name: Kian Shay Harratt
- Date of birth: 21 June 2002 (age 24)
- Place of birth: Pontefract, England
- Height: 6 ft 0 in (1.82 m)
- Position: Striker

Team information
- Current team: Spalding United
- Number: 19

Youth career
- Barnsley
- Leeds United
- 2017–2019: Huddersfield Town

Senior career*
| Years | Team | Apps | (Gls) |
| 2019–2025 | Huddersfield Town | 25 | (2) |
| 2020 | → Harrogate Town (loan) | 4 | (0) |
| 2020 | → Guiseley (loan) | 5 | (0) |
| 2022 | → Port Vale (loan) | 19 | (3) |
| 2022 | → Bradford City (loan) | 5 | (0) |
| 2024–2025 | → Fleetwood Town (loan) | 16 | (1) |
| 2025 | Fleetwood Town | 4 | (0) |
| 2025–2026 | Oldham Athletic | 17 | (3) |
| 2026 | → Brackley Town (loan) | 10 | (1) |
| 2026 | Worksop Town | 11 | (3) |
| 2026– | Spalding United | 1 | (0) |
- * Club domestic league appearances and goals as of 18:00, 14 November 2026 (UTC)

Kian Shay Harratt (born 21 June 2002) is an English professional footballer who plays as a striker for National League North club Spalding United.

Harratt made his professional debut at Huddersfield Town in December 2019. He went on to play on loan at Harrogate Town, Guiseley, Port Vale and Bradford City. He helped Port Vale to win promotion out of League Two via the play-offs in 2022. Between November 2022 and December 2024, he received two criminal convictions, one for hare coursing and one for poaching, and received a four-month ban from football for betting on football matches. He spent the first half of the 2024–25 season on loan at Fleetwood Town before the deal was made permanent in the January transfer window. He was sold to Oldham Athletic two months later. He was promoted out of the National League play-offs with Oldham in 2025. He was loaned to Brackley Town in January 2026. He was released by Oldham and joined Worksop Town in July 2026, but left the club by mutual consent in October 2026. He joined Spalding United the following month.

== Early and personal life ==
Harratt was born in Pontefract, West Yorkshire and raised in nearby Hemsworth. On 1 November 2022, Harratt was fined £830 and ordered to pay £150 in costs and a victim surcharge of £83 after being convicted of taking part in hare coursing with two accomplices. On 19 December 2024, he and an accomplice were fined £1,153 each for entering land as a trespasser at night with poaching equipment after being arrested in Whashton on 6 February. A video of him throwing a chair at a woman whilst on holiday in Ibiza went viral in June 2025, though he defended his actions on TikTok by saying he "felt terrible" and was "very apologetic" as he had instead meant to hit a man who had antagonised his friends.

== Career ==
=== Huddersfield Town ===
Harratt played for junior club Upton United and was at the academies at Barnsley and Leeds United, before signing for Huddersfield Town at under-17 level after impressing during a trial spell. He scored 32 goals in 47 games for the under-17 and under-19 teams in the 2018–19 season. He made his Championship debut in a 2–0 defeat to West Yorkshire derby rivals Leeds United at Kirklees Stadium on 7 December 2019; manager Danny Cowley played him as a 72nd-minute substitute for Josh Koroma.

Harratt joined National League club Harrogate Town on a one-month loan starting on 17 January 2020. He picked up an assist for Alex Bradley on his first start for the club, in a 2–0 victory over Eastleigh in the FA Trophy at Wetherby Road; manager Simon Weaver stated that "his energy output and his movement caused Eastleigh a lot of problems... you can see he is going to get a lot of goals in his career". The loan was extended, though the 2019–20 season was curtailed early due to the COVID-19 pandemic in England, and he returned to Harrogate for the play-offs in July. He was an unused substitute in the play-off final at Wembley Stadium, where Harrogate secured a place in the English Football League with victory over Notts County.

Harratt joined National League North side Guiseley on loan on 24 October 2020, on a loan intended to last until 3 January 2021, but was recalled by Huddersfield manager Carlos Corberán on 15 December. He signed an extended contract in December 2021, to keep him at the club until June 2025, with an additional year option.

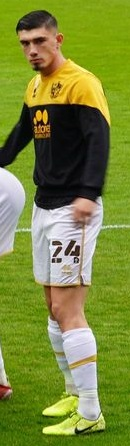
Harratt warming up at Vale Park in May 2022.

He joined League Two club Port Vale on loan on 7 January 2022, until the end of the 2021–22 season, where he would be reunited with former Huddersfield academy coach Dean Whitehead. Huddersfield's Head of Football Operations Leigh Bromby stated that "it was clear from our conversations how much they wanted the player and the role they envisage for him". He scored with a diving header on making his debut the following day, having come on as a substitute in a 4–1 defeat to Premier League club Brentford in an FA Cup third-round game at Vale Park. Manager Darrell Clarke said after the game that "he has got a bit about him... we are really pleased and thankful to Huddersfield for allowing [the loan]". Harratt went on to also score on his league debut for the "Valiants" in a 3–1 defeat to Swindon Town on 15 January. On 15 March, he came off the bench to score a brace in a 3–1 home win over Mansfield Town, receiving a booking for taking his shirt off during the first goal celebration, and was compared to a young Billy Sharp by acting manager Andy Crosby. He started in the play-off final at Wembley Stadium as Vale secured promotion with a 3–0 victory over Mansfield Town; Michael Baggaley of The Sentinel wrote that "The Stags defence couldn't handle him" and that he "put Vale in front with a diving header and was only denied a second by the offside flag".

On 2 June 2022, he returned to League Two after agreeing to join Huddersfield's West Yorkshire derby rivals Bradford City on loan for the entirety of the 2022–23 season. Manager Mark Hughes said that: "Kian has a big personality and a real drive to succeed, so we are looking forward to seeing how he fares at Valley Parade." He made his club debut as a substitute on 30 July and was sent off deep into stoppage time following an altercation with Doncaster Rovers goalkeeper Jonathan Mitchell as Bradford recorded a 0–0 home draw. He received a three-match ban following the incident. He scored his first and only goal for Bradford in an EFL Trophy tie against Sheffield Wednesday on 30 August. His father spoke out on social media in September to complain of his son's lack of game time at the club. On 4 November 2022, Harratt's loan at Bradford was terminated and he returned to Huddersfield, following his criminal conviction for hare coursing. He scored his first goal for Huddersfield on 7 April 2023, scoring a late header in a 3–2 win away at Watford. Manager Neil Warnock described him as a "good lad" and challenged the player to establish himself in the Huddersfield first-team the following season.

He signed a contract extension in August 2023, with sporting director Mark Cartwright commenting that "his next challenge is to break into the first team on a more consistent basis". He scored two goals in 16 games in the 2023–24 season. He was given a four-month ban and fined £3,200 in February 2024 after placing 484 bets on football matches, including those involving his parent and loan clubs, between 30 June 2020 and 3 June 2023.

=== Fleetwood Town ===
On 30 August 2024, Harratt returned to League Two on a season-long loan with Fleetwood Town despite having featured four times for Huddersfield at the start of the 2024–25 campaign. On 7 January, the loan deal was made into a permanent transfer on undisclosed terms after he had registered three goals and an assist in 20 appearances.

=== Oldham Athletic ===
On 11 March 2025, Harratt joined National League side Oldham Athletic for an undisclosed fee, signing a contract until the end of the 2025–26 season. He scored the winning goal in extra-time of the 3–2 victory over Southend United in the final at Wembley to secure the club a place back in the English Football League. He scored his first goal of the 2025–26 season on 29 December, securing a 2–1 victory at Walsall.

On 24 January 2026, Harratt returned to the National League to join Brackley Town on loan until the end of the 2025–26 season. Brackley went on to be relegated, with Harratt contributing one goal from eleven appearances. Upon his return to Boundary Park, he was named as one of seven players to be released upon the season's conclusion.

=== Worksop Town ===
On 15 July 2026, Harratt joined National League North club Worksop Town following a successful trial period. He scored in his first two appearances, and ended his time at the club with three goals in 11 league games. He left the club via mutual consent on 28 October 2026.

=== Spalding United ===
On 14 November 2026, Harratt joined National League North club Spalding United, and made his debut later that day in the FA Trophy.

== Style of play ==
Harratt is a striker with a strong physical presence and good movement.

== Career statistics ==
As of match played 14 November 2026

Appearances and goals by club, season and competition
| Club | Season | League | | | FA Cup | | EFL Cup | | Other | | Total | |
| Club | Season | Division | Apps | Goals | Apps | Goals | Apps | Goals | Apps | Goals | Apps | Goals |
|---|---|---|---|---|---|---|---|---|---|---|---|---|
| Huddersfield Town | 2019–20 | Championship | 1 | 0 | 0 | 0 | 0 | 0 | — | | 1 | 0 |
| Huddersfield Town | 2020–21 | Championship | 0 | 0 | 0 | 0 | 0 | 0 | — | | 0 | 0 |
| Huddersfield Town | 2021–22 | Championship | 0 | 0 | 0 | 0 | 0 | 0 | 0 | 0 | 0 | 0 |
| Huddersfield Town | 2022–23 | Championship | 4 | 1 | 1 | 0 | 0 | 0 | — | | 5 | 1 |
| Huddersfield Town | 2023–24 | Championship | 15 | 1 | 0 | 0 | 1 | 1 | — | | 16 | 2 |
| Huddersfield Town | 2024–25 | League One | 2 | 0 | 0 | 0 | 2 | 0 | 0 | 0 | 4 | 0 |
| Huddersfield Town | Total | | 22 | 2 | 1 | 0 | 3 | 1 | 0 | 0 | 26 | 3 |
| Harrogate Town (loan) | 2019–20 | National League | 4 | 0 | — | | — | | 2 (Note: Appearances in FA Trophy) | 0 | 6 | 0 |
| Guiseley (loan) | 2020–21 | National League North | 5 | 0 | 1 | 0 | — | | 0 | 0 | 6 | 0 |
| Port Vale (loan) | 2021–22 | League Two | 19 | 3 | 1 | 1 | — | | 2 (Note: Appearances in EFL League Two play-offs) | 1 | 22 | 5 |
| Bradford City (loan) | 2022–23 | League Two | 5 | 0 | 0 | 0 | 1 | 0 | 3 (Note: Appearances in EFL Trophy) | 1 | 9 | 1 |
| Fleetwood Town (loan) | 2024–25 | League Two | 16 | 1 | 1 | 0 | 0 | 0 | 3 | 2 | 20 | 3 |
| Fleetwood Town | 2024–25 | League Two | 4 | 0 | — | | — | | — | | 4 | 0 |
| Fleetwood Town | Total | | 20 | 1 | 1 | 0 | 0 | 0 | 3 | 2 | 24 | 3 |
| Oldham Athletic | 2024–25 | National League | 9 | 2 | — | | — | | 1 (Note: Appearance in National League play-offs) | 1 | 10 | 3 |
| Oldham Athletic | 2025–26 | League Two | 8 | 1 | 0 | 0 | 1 | 0 | 2 | 0 | 11 | 1 |
| Oldham Athletic | Total | | 17 | 3 | 0 | 0 | 1 | 0 | 3 | 1 | 21 | 4 |
| Brackley Town (loan) | 2025–26 | National League | 10 | 1 | — | | — | | 1 (Note: Appearance in National League Cup) | 0 | 11 | 1 |
| Worksop Town | 2026–27 (Note: Sources for individual cup appearances for Worksop Town in the 2026–27 season:) | National League North | 11 | 3 | 3 | 0 | — | | 1 (Note: Appearance in Sheffield & Hallamshire Senior Cup) | 1 | 15 | 4 |
| Spalding United | 2026–27 (Note: Sources for individual cup appearances for Spalding United in the 2026–27 season:) | National League North | 1 | 0 | — | | — | | 1 | 0 | 2 | 0 |
| Career total | | | 114 | 13 | 7 | 1 | 5 | 1 | 16 | 6 | 142 | 21 |

== Honours ==
Harrogate Town

- National League play-offs: 2020

Port Vale

- EFL League Two play-offs: 2022

Oldham Athletic

- National League play-offs: 2025
