= 2022 EFL League Two play-off final =

Association football match

- Wembley Stadium in London hosted the final.
Mansfield Town	Port Vale
0	3
- Date: 28 May 2022
- Venue: Wembley Stadium, London
- Man of the Match: James Wilson
- Referee: Jarred Gillett
- Attendance: 37,303

The 2022 EFL League Two play-off final was an association football match which was played on 28 May 2022 at Wembley Stadium, London, to determine the fourth and final team to gain promotion from EFL League Two, the fourth tier of English football, to EFL League One. The top three teams of the League Two, Forest Green Rovers, Exeter City and Bristol Rovers, gained automatic promotion to League One, while the clubs placed from fourth to seventh in the table took part in the 2022 English Football League play-offs. Port Vale and Mansfield Town competed for the final place in the 2022–23 season in League One.

Jarred Gillett was the referee for the match, which was played in front of 37,303 spectators. Port Vale took the lead midway through the first half through Kian Harratt and doubled their advantage four minutes later when James Wilson scored. Mansfield Town's Oliver Hawkins was then sent off after being shown two yellow cards in the space of five minutes to reduce his team to ten players. Port Vale had two goals disallowed for offside before Mal Benning scored with five minutes to go to secure a 3–0 win for his side. Wilson was named man of the match.

== Route to the final ==
EFL League Two final table, leading positions
Pos	Team	Pld	W	D	L	GF	GA	GD	Pts
1	Forest Green Rovers (C, P)	46	23	15	8	75	44	+31	84
2	Exeter City (P)	46	23	15	8	65	41	+24	84
3	Bristol Rovers (P)	46	23	11	12	71	49	+22	80
4	Northampton Town	46	23	11	12	60	38	+22	80
5	Port Vale	46	22	12	12	67	46	+21	78
6	Swindon Town	46	22	11	13	77	54	+23	77
7	Mansfield Town	46	22	11	13	67	52	+15	77

(C) Champions; (P) Promoted

Port Vale finished the regular 2021–22 season in fifth place in EFL League Two, the fourth tier of the English football league system, two places and one point ahead of Mansfield Town. Both therefore missed out on the three automatic places for promotion to EFL League One and instead took part in the play-offs to determine the fourth promoted team. Port Vale finished two points behind Bristol Rovers (who were promoted in third place) and six behind both second-placed Exeter City and league winners Forest Green Rovers. Northampton Town dropped to fourth position in the table on the final day of regular season despite winning 3–1 at Barrow, as Bristol Rovers defeated bottom club Scunthorpe United 7–0 to secure automatic promotion on goals scored.

Mansfield Town faced fourth-placed Northampton Town in their play-off semi-final with the first match of the two-legged tie being held at the One Call Stadium in Mansfield on 14 May 2022. Rhys Oates gave the home side an early lead when he struck the ball into the Northampton Town goal through goalkeeper Jonny Maxted's legs. Jordan Bowery then scored in the 31st minute from a Jamie Murphy cross to double Mansfield Town's lead. Midway through the second half, Northampton Town halved the deficit when Ali Koiki scored after a pass from Louis Appéré, and the match ended 2–1. The second leg took place four days later at Sixfields Stadium in Northampton. Steve McLaughlin gave the visiting side the lead in the 31st minute, from an Elliott Hewitt cross, to extend Mansfield Town's aggregate lead. Despite dominating possession, Northampton Town failed to score and the match ended 1–0, with Mansfield Town progressing to the play-off final 3–1 on aggregate.

In the other play-off semi-final, Port Vale faced Swindon Town and the first leg was played on 15 May 2022 at the County Ground in Swindon. Midway through the first half, Harry McKirdy gave the home side the lead, scoring with a header from a corner from Jonny Williams. He doubled his side's advantage in the 68th minute: Port Vale goalkeeper Aidan Stone saved a shot from Jack Payne but the ball rebounded to McKirdy who scored. With seven minutes remaining, Port Vale scored through James Wilson who tapped the ball into the Swindon Town goal from a Jamie Proctor shot, and the match ended 2–1 to Swindon Town. The return leg took place at Vale Park, Stoke-on-Trent, four days later. Eight minutes into the match, Kian Harratt crossed the ball for Port Vale's Wilson to score, to level the tie 2–2 on aggregate. No further goals were scored in regular time, and the match went into extra time, during which Darrell Clarke, the Port Vale manager, was sent off after an altercation with Dion Conroy. No additional goals were scored so the game had to be decided with a penalty shoot-out. Swindon Town goalkeeper Lewis Ward saved penalties from both David Worrall and Ryan Edmondson but McKirdy's strike went high over the crossbar. Stone then saved Josh Davison's penalty before Mal Benning scored Port Vale's sixth spot-kick to make it 6–5. Ellis Iandolo's penalty was off-target and Port Vale won the shoot-out to qualify for the final. After the shoot-out, a crowd of supporters invaded the pitch, with Swindon Town manager Ben Garner stating that his players had been "verbally and physically abused".

== Match ==
=== Background ===
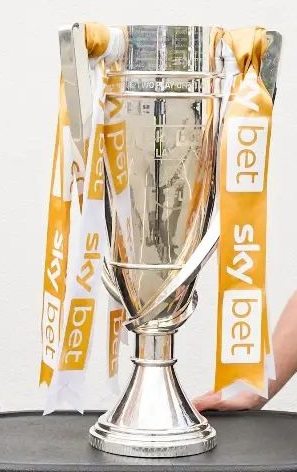
The play-off trophy in Port Vale colours

This was Mansfield Town's second appearance in a play-off final, having lost on penalties to Huddersfield Town in the 2004 Football League Third Division play-off final. They had played in the fourth tier of English football since gaining promotion back to the English Football League after winning the Football Conference in the 2012–13 season. This was Mansfield Town's first visit to Wembley Stadium since losing 1–0 against Darlington in the 2011 FA Trophy final. Port Vale had participated in play-off finals twice before, winning the two-legged 1989 Football League Third Division play-off final against Bristol Rovers, and losing the 1993 Football League Second Division play-off final 3–0 against West Bromwich Albion at the old Wembley stadium. They had played in League Two since being relegated from League One in the 2016–17 season. This year's play-off final marked Port Vale's first appearance at the renovated Wembley Stadium.

In the league games between the sides during the regular season, Port Vale secured a 1–1 draw away at the One Call Stadium in October 2021 before winning 3–1 at home the following March. Going into the final, Wilson was Port Vale's top scorer with 14 goals in 46 matches, followed by Proctor on 13 goals in 33 games. Oates was the leading scorer for Mansfield Town, having scored 12 goals in 44 games, followed by Bowery on 9 goals in 46 matches.

In May 2022, the EFL announced that for the first time, the video assistant referee (VAR) system would be used at all play-off finals. The referee for the final was Jarred Gillett, who was assisted by Neil Davies and Nick Greenhalgh. James Linnington was the fourth official while Peter Bankes acted as the VAR. Before the match, Mansfield Town's manager Nigel Clough confirmed that neither he nor Clarke were consulted about the introduction of VAR. Port Vale made no changes to their starting eleven from the side who played in the second leg of the play-off semi-final while Mansfield brought in Murphy and Matty Longstaff. Mansfield Town wore gold shirts, navy shorts and gold socks while Port Vale's kit comprised white shirts, shorts and socks.

Port Vale manager Clarke had returned from bereavement leave 22 days before the final and upon winning the play-off semi-final stated that: "We've got one more game to go against Mansfield, which is fitting because it's where my eldest daughter came from ... it's the town where I was born ... it'll be an emotional day but I'm looking forward to the final." Andy Crosby, Port Vale's assistant manager, led his side out for the final, having covered for Clarke during his absence earlier in the season.

=== Summary ===
James Wilson scored Port Vale's second goal.

Mansfield Town kicked off the match at around 4.00 p.m. on 28 May 2022 in front of 37,303 supporters at Wembley Stadium, London. In the ninth minute, Murphy took advantage of a mistake between Port Vale's goalkeeper Stone and James Gibbons but his header was saved by Stone. Seven minutes later, Hall headed the ball back into his own penalty area forcing Stone to make a clearance. On 19 minutes, John-Joe O'Toole conceded possession of the ball midway inside his own half allowing Port Vale's Ben Garrity to pass to Harratt whose long-range shot struck the bottom of the Mansfield Town goalpost. A minute later, Port Vale took the lead when Benning's cross was headed into the Mansfield Town goal at close range by Harratt. In the 24th minute, Port Vale doubled their lead through Wilson: Worrall crossed from the right and Garrity's header struck the Mansfield Town crossbar, rebounding to Wilson who scored. In the 30th minute, Hawkins received the first booking of the game for a foul on Port Vale's Nathan Smith. Four minutes later, Benning's shot was saved at the near post by Mansfield Town's goalkeeper Nathan Bishop. Hawkins was then sent off in the 35th minute after receiving his second yellow card in the space of five minutes, this time for a late tackle on Wilson. With three minutes of regular time in the half remaining, Connor Hall cleared a close-range shot from Bowery after a mistake from Stone. Hewitt became the second Mansfield Town player to be booked when he fouled Jake Taylor in the 44th minute before Benning's free kick was headed wide of the Mansfield Town goal. In first-half injury time, James Perch was shown a yellow card for late tackle on Garrity but the resulting free kick Wilson went narrowly outside the post. Bishop then saved from Wilson and the half came to an end with Port Vale leading 2–0.

Neither side made any changes to their playing personnel during the interval. In the 52nd minute, Taylor's volley from just outside the Mansfield Town penalty area went wide of the goalpost. Two minutes later, Mansfield Town made the first substitution of the match with George Lapslie coming on to replace Murphy. On the hour mark, McLaughlin's strike went wide of Port Vale's goal. Soon after, Harratt shot the ball from close range into the Mansfield Town net but the goal was disallowed as he was adjudged to have been offside. In the 66th minute, Mansfield Town made their second change, with George Maris replacing Longstaff. A minute later, former Mansfield Town player Harry Charsley came on in place of Taylor in Port Vale's first substitution of the game. In the 70th minute, Port Vale had a second disallowed goal after Charsley struck the ball into the net from a curling Worrall cross: the recent substitute was deemed to have been offside. Two minutes later Stone saved a shot from Oates who also saw a 74th-minute strike go wide of the Port Vale goal. With 14 minutes of the match remaining, Proctor replaced Harratt for Port Vale in their second substitution. Three minutes later Lucas Akins came on for Mansfield Town's last substitution, in place of Stephen Quinn. In the 85th minute, Benning made it 3–0 to Port Vale after volleying in a cross from Worrall. Aaron Martin then replaced Worrall in Port Vale's final substitution of the game. After three minutes of injury time, the final whistle was blown and Port Vale won the match 3–0 to secure promotion to League One.

=== Details ===
28 May 2022
16:00 BST

Mansfield Town	0–3	Port Vale
	Report	Harratt 20'; Wilson 24'; Benning 85'

Wembley Stadium, London
Attendance: 37,303
Referee: Jarred Gillett

Mansfield Town	Port Vale

GK	1	(England) Nathan Bishop
RB	4	(Wales) Elliott Hewitt	(yellow card) 44'
CB	14	(England) James Perch	(yellow card) 45+4'
CB	12	(England) Oliver Hawkins	(yellow card) 30' (yellow-red card) 35'
LB	3	(England) Stephen McLaughlin
RM	44	(England) Matty Longstaff	(substituted off) 65'
CM	35	(Republic of Ireland) John-Joe O'Toole
LM	16	(Republic of Ireland) Stephen Quinn	(substituted off) 79'
MF	7	(Scotland) Jamie Murphy	(substituted off) 54'
FW	9	(England) Jordan Bowery
FW	18	(England) Rhys Oates
Substitutes:
GK	24	(Czech Republic) Marek Štěch
DF	23	(England) Kieran Wallace
MF	8	(England) Ollie Clarke
MF	10	(England) George Maris	(substituted on) 65'
MF	25	(Wales) Ryan Stirk
MF	32	(England) George Lapslie	(substituted on) 54'
FW	34	(England) Lucas Akins	(substituted on) 79'
Manager: (England) Nigel Clough

GK	26	(England) Aidan Stone
RB	2	(England) James Gibbons
CB	6	(England) Nathan Smith
LB	5	(England) Connor Hall
RM	7	(England) David Worrall	(substituted off) 86'
CM	23	(England) Tom Pett
CM	17	(England) Jake Taylor	(substituted off) 67'
LM	11	(England) Mal Benning
MF	8	(England) Ben Garrity
FW	9	(England) James Wilson
FW	24	(England) Kian Harratt	(substituted off) 77'
Substitutes:
GK	1	(Brazil) Lucas Covolan
DF	16	(England) Aaron Martin	(substituted on) 86'
DF	21	(England) Sammy Robinson
MF	20	(Republic of Ireland) Harry Charsley	(substituted on) 67'
FW	13	(England) Jamie Proctor	(substituted on) 77'
FW	19	(England) David Amoo
FW	29	(England) Ryan Edmondson
Manager: (England) Darrell Clarke

Statistics
	Mansfield Town	Port Vale
Possession	55%	45%
Goals scored	0	3
Shots on target	2	6
Shots off target	5	11
Fouls committed	9	6
Corner kicks	5	3
Yellow cards	3	0
Red cards	1	0

== Post-match ==
Reflecting on the season and his personal life, Port Vale manager Clarke said "With all we’ve come through, to put in that performance in the manner we did was outstanding." Mansfield Town manager Nigel Clough said "We didn't give ourselves a chance" and noted that he would not be watching his former side Nottingham Forest in the 2022 EFL Championship play-off final, claiming "I don’t care if I don’t see another football game for the foreseeable future". Wilson was named as man of the match.
