= Wolgarston High School =

Location
- Cannock road Penkridge, Staffordshire, ST19 5RX; England
- Coordinates: 52.72257°N 2.098249°W

Information
- Type: Academy
- Local authority: Staffordshire County Council
- Trust: Penk Valley Academy Trust
- Department for Education URN: 145381 Tables
- Ofsted: Reports
- Chair of Governors: Kevin Maycock
- Headteacher: Dan Boden
- Gender: Coeducational
- Age: 13 to 18
- Houses: Alps; Pyrenees; Himalayas; Rockies
- Colours: Purple and Green
- Website: http://www.wolgarston.staffs.sch.uk/

Wolgarston High School is a coeducational upper school and sixth form located in Penkridge, Staffordshire, England. Wolgarston High School is an age 13 to 18 school, with Year 9 as the main year of entry. The school is smaller than most secondary schools, but with a relatively large sixth form. The great majority of students are from White British backgrounds. The proportions of students who have learning difficulties and/or disabilities or who are eligible for free school meals are both well below national averages. The proportion of students who have a statement of special educational needs is just below the national average. The proportion of students from minority ethnic backgrounds is much lower than the national average. The school has a Leading Parent Partnership award, an International School award and Healthy Schools status. It was redesignated as a Specialist Technology College in 2007. Since 2018 the school converted to academy status and is part of the Penk Valley Academy Trust.
