= James Gibbons (footballer) =

English footballer (born 1998)

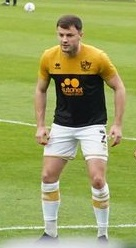
- Gibbons warming up at Vale Park in May 2022

Personal information
- Full name: James Andrew Gibbons
- Date of birth: 16 March 1998 (age 28)
- Place of birth: Trentham, Stoke-on-Trent, England
- Height: 5 ft 9 in (1.75 m)
- Position: Full-back

Team information
- Current team: Notts County
- Number: 2

Youth career
- 2009–2016: Port Vale

Senior career*
Years	Team	Apps	(Gls)
2016–2022	Port Vale	111	(3)
2016	→ Leek Town (loan)	4	(0)
2022–2024	Bristol Rovers	37	(0)
2024	→ Cambridge United (loan)	13	(0)
2024–2026	Cambridge United	68	(7)
2026–	Notts County	0	(0)
- * Club domestic league appearances and goals as of 08:23, 3 May 2026 (UTC)

James Andrew Gibbons (born 16 March 1998) is an English professional footballer who plays as a full-back for EFL League One club Notts County.

A graduate of the Port Vale youth team, he enjoyed a short loan spell at Leek Town in the 2016–17 season and made his first-team debut at Vale Park in December 2016. He established himself in the first team during the 2017–18 season, and though he found himself frequently overlooked the following season, he managed to regain his first-team place during the 2019–20 campaign. He helped the club to win promotion out of League Two via the play-offs in 2022, before signing with Bristol Rovers in June 2022. He spent the second half of the 2023–24 season on loan at Cambridge United, after which he joined the club permanently. He was named as the club's Player of the Year for the 2025–26 League Two promotion-winning season, also being named on the PFA Team of the Year, though subsequently moved on to Notts County.

== Career ==
=== Port Vale ===
Gibbons first joined Port Vale at the age of 11, though by the age of 15, coaches questioned whether he would make it in the game due to his small stature. At the age of 13 he was tasked with collecting donations for the club in a bucket as they battled administration. He went on to turn professional at the club under Rob Page in April 2016. He joined Northern Premier League Division One South club Leek Town on a one-month loan on 17 September 2016, and made his debut for the club later that day in a 2–1 defeat to Sheffield. He made a total of five starts for the club. He made his senior debut for the "Valiants" as a 60th-minute substitute for Paulo Tavares in a 4–0 victory over Hartlepool United in an FA Cup tie at Vale Park on 4 December 2016. He signed a new one-year contract in May 2017.

He did not make a first-team appearance under manager Michael Brown, but was selected by caretaker-managers David Kelly and Chris Morgan for his EFL League Two debut on 23 September 2017, and was sent off after receiving two yellow cards during what ended as a 1–1 draw at Yeovil Town. New manager Neil Aspin said that "I don't look at him as a young lad, I just look at him as a player. He is a player who deserves to be playing and I am happy with him." He signed a two-year contract extension in November to keep him at the club until 2020. He was sent off for the second time in his career on 12 December, again away at Yeovil, for committing a dangerous challenge; he was handed a four-match suspension. However, Aspin heavily criticised referee Gavin Ward and said, "there is no criticism from me [for Gibbons] in this instance because he is a competitive player and we want to keep that". Gibbons returned to the starting eleven after serving his suspension, and though the defensive line-up changed due to the departures of Gavin Gunning and Tom Anderson he refused to accept any excuses for what he admitted was a decline in the team's form and his performances. He was named as the club's Young Player of the Year at the end of the 2017–18 season.

He started the 2018–19 season in the starting eleven as a right-back and had only teenage loanee Mitch Clark as competition. However, he found himself out of the starting eleven as Aspin felt he was too inconsistent. A hip injury then saw him sidelined for a month. On 29 January 2019, he was sent off for the third time in his career during a 0–0 draw at Newport County, but the club successfully appealed the red card. He made the last of his 19 appearances of the season in a 1–0 defeat at Cheltenham Town on 23 February.

He started the 2019–20 season as new manager John Askey's first-choice right-back, ahead of new signing Callum Evans. He did, however, pick up five yellow cards in the league before October and was given a one match suspension, leading to Askey to criticise him for picking up "daft bookings". After a public vote held in December 2019, he was named by The Sentinel as Port Vale's second-best right-back of the 2010s with 27% of the vote, behind Adam Yates (62%) and ahead of Ben Purkiss (11%). On 14 January, he scored his first goal in professional football during a 2–1 defeat at Morecambe. It was revealed the next month that the club had an option to extend his contract beyond the summer. However, he instead signed a new contract to keep him at the club until summer 2022.

He missed the start of the 2020–21 season after picking up an injury in pre-season, which allowed new signing Zak Mills to begin the campaign at right-back. He then picked up a hamstring injury in his second appearance of the season and was ruled out of action for the first half of the season after undergoing surgery. He marked his 100th appearance for the club with a return to the starting eleven, in a 5–0 victory over Southend United on 30 January. However, he aggravated the hamstring injury in the penultimate game of the season in May. New manager Darrell Clarke began an overhaul of the playing squad in May 2021 but publicly praised Gibbons and two other existing players (Nathan Smith and Tom Conlon); Gibbons said that hearing such praise from the manager whilst injured "means the world" to him.

Gibbons missed the start of the 2021–22 season with his hamstring injury, returning to fitness at the end of August. With David Worrall now established at right-wing-back in a 3–5–2 formation, Gibbons slotted into the side at left-wing-back and formed "an impressive relationship" with left-sided centre-half Dan Jones. After providing an assist and a goal during a 3–2 defeat at Oldham Athletic on 20 November, it was reported in The Sentinel that "his performances at left wing back have been a highlight of the season so far". After signing veteran left-wing-back Chris Hussey in the January transfer window, Clarke stated that Gibbons would remain an important members of the squad and that he liked to have competition for all positions. However, Gibbons picked up another hamstring injury which saw him ruled out for a few weeks. He returned to action in mid-February and said "I trust my hamstrings now. Hopefully, that is the last of them." Instead he missed a month of action with ankle ligament damage. He started in the play-off final at Wembley Stadium as Vale secured promotion with a 3–0 victory over Mansfield Town; Michael Baggaley of The Sentinel wrote that "[Gibbons] had a fine game... quality player who proved it again when it mattered". He was offered a new contract in June 2022.

=== Bristol Rovers ===
On 22 June 2022, Gibbons joined fellow newly promoted League One side Bristol Rovers on a two-year deal, having turned down the offer of a new contract with Port Vale. Gibbons made his debut at the Memorial Stadium on the opening day of the 2022–23 season as Rovers fell to a late 2–1 defeat to another newly promoted side in Forest Green Rovers. Gibbons played the full ninety minutes in Rovers' first two matches of the season, before a scan revealed a stress fracture in his foot that would rule him out through injury for around eight to twelve weeks. Gibbons' return to first-team action came on 4 October when he came off of the bench in a 2–0 EFL Trophy victory over Crystal Palace U21. He dropped to the bench the following month as manager Joey Barton switched to a back three and preferred Scott Sinclair at right-wing-back.

He missed the start of the 2023–24 season due to injury. In his first appearance of the campaign, Gibbons scored his first goal for the club in a 4–1 EFL Trophy Group stage victory over Cheltenham Town, later scoring an own goal. He made a further 13 appearances for Rovers, including an FA Cup game with Whitby Town in which he set up the opening goal. However, he lost his first-team place under new boss Matt Taylor, with Jack Hunt and Luke Thomas being preferred at right-back. Bristol Rovers released him in June 2024 at the end of his contract.

=== Cambridge United ===
On 30 January 2024, Gibbons joined fellow League One club Cambridge United on loan for the remainder of the 2023–24 season, saying that Neil Harris is "a gaffer that I want to play for and work for". He was named in the League One team of the week for his performance in a 4–0 win at Carlisle United on 17 February. He played at right-back, left-back, left-wing back and centre-half during his time at Cambridge. He signed a two-year contract with the club on 25 June.

Gibbons picked up a knee injury in a match against Peterborough United in November and was ruled out of action for three months. He returned to action in the new year, though was sent off on 1 March for a foul on Crawley Town's Charlie Barker. He featured 30 times in the 2024–25 campaign, which ended in relegation into League Two. He was nominated for the December 2025 PFA League Two fans' player of the month award. He was named in the EFL Team of the Week with 11 clearances and 11 duels in a "commanding display" during a 2–1 win at Fleetwood Town. He was nominated as League Two Player of the Month after Cambridge kept three clean sheets in six games throughout April, with Gibbons claiming three goals and an assist. He was named as Cambridge United Player of the Year for the 2025–26 season, which ended in Cambridge securing automatic promotion back into League One. He was named on the League Two Team of the Season, having more goal involvements than any other defender in the division. He was also named on the League Two PFA Team of the Year.

=== Notts County ===
On 29 May 2026, Gibbons agreed to join fellow newly promoted League One club Notts County on a two-year deal.

== Style of play ==
Gibbons is a right-back, though can also fill in at left-back. His physicality has led to a poor disciplinary record and therefore suspensions, though Gibbons commented that "you are not going to win every tackle so it is going to happen". He is also adept at going forward and delivering crosses.

== Career statistics ==
As of match played 2 May 2026

Appearances and goals by club, season and competition
Club	Season	League			FA Cup		EFL Cup		Other		Total	
Club	Season	Division	Apps	Goals	Apps	Goals	Apps	Goals	Apps	Goals	Apps	Goals
Port Vale	2016–17	League One	0	0	1	0	0	0	0	0	1	0
Port Vale	2017–18	League Two	30	0	3	0	0	0	3 (Note: Appearances in the EFL Trophy.)	0	36	0
Port Vale	2018–19	League Two	15	0	0	0	0	0	4	0	19	0
Port Vale	2019–20	League Two	32	1	3	0	1	0	3	0	39	1
Port Vale	2020–21	League Two	11	0	0	0	0	0	1	0	12	0
Port Vale	2021–22	League Two	23	2	3	0	0	0	5 (Note: 2 appearance in the EFL Trophy and 3 appearances in the play-offs)	0	31	2
Port Vale	Total		111	3	10	0	1	0	16	0	138	3
Leek Town (loan)	2016–17	Northern Premier League; Division One South	4	0	0	0	—		1 (Note: Appearance(s) in the FA Trophy.)	0	5	0
Bristol Rovers	2022–23	League One	28	0	2	0	0	0	4	0	34	0
Bristol Rovers	2023–24	League One	9	0	1	0	0	0	4	1	14	1
Bristol Rovers	Total		37	0	3	0	0	0	8	1	48	1
Cambridge United (loan)	2023–24	League One	13	0	—		—		—		13	0
Cambridge United	2024–25	League One	29	1	1	0	0	0	0	0	30	1
Cambridge United	2025–26	League Two	39	6	2	0	2	0	2	0	45	6
Cambridge United	Total		81	7	3	0	2	0	2	0	88	7
Notts County	2026–27	League One	0	0	0	0	0	0	0	0	0	0
Career total			233	10	16	0	3	0	27	1	279	11

== Honours ==
Port Vale

- EFL League Two play-offs: 2022

Cambridge United

- EFL League Two promotion: 2025–26

Individual

- Cambridge United Player of the Year: 2025–26
- PFA Team of the Year: 2025–26 League Two
