= Rhys Browne =

English-Antiguan footballer (born 1995)

Personal information
- Full name: Stephen Rhys Browne
- Date of birth: 16 November 1995 (age 30)
- Place of birth: Romford, England
- Height: 1.77 m (5 ft 10 in)
- Positions: Winger; forward

Team information
- Current team: Chelmsford City
- Number: 14

Youth career
- Interwood
- 2012–2014: Norwich City

Senior career*
Years	Team	Apps	(Gls)
2014–2015	Charlton Athletic	0	(0)
2015	→ VCD Athletic (loan)	3	(1)
2015–2016	Aldershot Town	37	(6)
2016–2017	Grimsby Town	5	(0)
2017	→ Macclesfield Town (loan)	17	(2)
2017–2019	Yeovil Town	63	(5)
2019–2020	Port Vale	11	(0)
2020–2021	Wealdstone	1	(0)
2021	Sutton United	12	(0)
2021–2022	Wealdstone	42	(13)
2022–2024	Woking	47	(15)
2024–2026	Barnet	42	(7)
2026–	Chelmsford City	9	(1)

International career^{‡}
2015–	Antigua and Barbuda	13	(2)
- * Club domestic league appearances and goals as of 18:40, 7 November 2026 (UTC) ‡ National team caps and goals as of 04:36, 28 September 2024 (UTC)

Stephen Rhys Browne (born 16 November 1995) is a footballer who plays for National League South club Chelmsford City. Able to play as a winger or striker, he has been capped by the Antigua and Barbuda national football team.

A former youth team player at Norwich City and Charlton Athletic, he also spent time on loan at Isthmian League side VCD Athletic. He won the FA Youth Cup and Norfolk Senior Cup with Norwich but did not play a first-team game for the "Canaries". He spent the 2015–16 season with Aldershot Town in the National League before winning a move into the English Football League with Grimsby Town in June 2016. From Grimsby, he was loaned out to Macclesfield Town and played on the losing side in the 2017 FA Trophy final. He joined Yeovil Town in June 2017 before departing following the club's relegation out of the Football League at the end of the 2018–19 season. However, he remained in the Football League, signing with Port Vale in July 2019. He left the club in August 2020 and joined Sutton United via Wealdstone in January 2021. Sutton went on to win promotion as National League champions at the end of the 2020–21 season. He rejoined Wealdstone in June 2021 and was sold to Woking in October 2022. He signed with Barnet in June 2024 and helped the team to the 2024–25 National League title. He moved on to Chelmsford City in May 2026.

== Club career ==
=== Early career ===
Browne joined Norwich City as a youth team player, having previously played for Interwood. He was part of the squad that won the 2012–13 FA Youth Cup with 4–2 aggregate victory over Chelsea, as well as the Norfolk Senior Cup that same season with a 2–0 win over Wroxham. He never made the senior team at Carrow Road however and was released by Norwich at the end of the 2013–14 season, subsequently joining Charlton Athletic. From Charlton he was loaned out to VCD Athletic of the Isthmian League. He left The Valley after being released by Charlton in May 2015.

=== Aldershot Town ===
Following his release from Charlton, Browne went on trial with National League club Aldershot Town. During his time on trial he scored in friendlies against Basingstoke Town and Chelsea under-21s, and impressed manager Barry Smith enough to win a contract on 31 July 2015. Browne made his competitive début and scored his first goal for the "Shots" in a 2–1 defeat to Gateshead at the Recreation Ground on 8 August. He went on to score seven goals in 41 appearances across the 2015–16 season as Aldershot posted a 15th-place finish.

=== Grimsby Town ===
On 21 June 2016, Browne signed a two-year contract with newly promoted League Two side Grimsby Town for an undisclosed fee. He made his debut for the "Mariners" in the EFL Cup, coming on as a 55th-minute substitute for Sean McAllister in a 1–0 defeat at Derby County. He made a further seven appearances for the club, all as a substitute, and new manager Marcus Bignot revealed that he was working to get the young striker a loan move closer to his family home after time spent on compassionate leave following the death of his father. On 12 January, he joined National League side Macclesfield Town on loan until the end of the 2016–17 season. He scored his first goal in his first league start for the "Silkmen", in a 1–0 win at Eastleigh on 21 February. He scored four goals in six games of the club's FA Trophy run, including one in the final at Wembley Stadium, though Macclesfield would lose the game 3–2 to York City. In all he scored six goals in 24 games during his time at Moss Rose.

Paul Hurst brought me in at Grimsby and left so there was a change in manager. After that it was a bit of a rollercoaster and not knowing how to settle so it wasn't anything about not liking it. A lot was happening with me off the field and I needed to play some games (out on loan) and take away what was going on. I was in a position where I was away from my family and not playing games.

— Browne arrived at Blundell Park at a bad time and found it difficult to settle.

=== Yeovil Town ===
On 16 June 2017, Browne left Grimsby for Yeovil Town, signing a two-year contract for an undisclosed fee. He stated that the "Glovers" aim was to achieve automatic promotion, though admitted that "I've never really played in this league before so I don't really know what the test is". On 30 January, he scored past former club Grimsby in a 3–0 win at Huish Park. He ended the 2017–18 campaign with six goals in 42 games as Darren Way's Yeovil posted a 19th-place finish. Having contributed just one goal from 30 appearances in the 2018–19 season and missing the end-of-season run-in with a hamstring injury, Yeovil released Browne following the club's relegation from the Football League.

=== Port Vale ===
Browne signed for League Two side Port Vale on 27 July 2019, having been on trial at the club throughout pre season; he had previously played under manager John Askey at Macclesfield Town. A hamstring problem caused him to miss the first month of the 2019–20 season, and he eventually made his debut for the "Valiants" on 14 September, replacing Callum Evans 35 minutes into a 1–0 win over Plymouth Argyle at Vale Park; ironically Evans was taken off due to a hamstring injury, as was winger David Amoo, leaving Browne with an opportunity to stake a first-team place in their absence. He scored his first goal for the club in an EFL Trophy tie against Mansfield Town on 3 December. After the game Askey commented that Browne "has a tendency to be lazy" but "has got a lot of ability [and] if he is confident then he can play at a high level". Speaking in February, first-team coach Danny Pugh said that "he has done exceptionally well in the last couple of games... [though] it has been a frustrating season [for him and] maybe he has not played as much as he would have liked". He signed a new one-year contract after he ended the campaign with one goals in 15 appearances. On 29 August 2020, Browne left Port Vale having had his contract terminated at his request. Askey cited family reasons for the player's departure, adding that "it was a shame because he was doing well".

=== Non-League ===
On 23 December 2020, Browne signed for National League side Wealdstone. He made only one brief appearance for the Stones, in a 4–0 defeat at Maidenhead United on Boxing Day. On 6 January 2021, Browne signed for fellow National League side Sutton United. He made 14 appearances in the second half of the 2020–21 season, as Sutton secured promotion into the Football League as champions of the National League. However, he was one of seven players released in the summer by manager Matt Gray. Browne returned to Wealdstone in June 2021, signing a one-year contract with an option for a second year. On 13 November 2021, Browne scored his first goal for the Stones, coming off the bench and scoring the only goal in a 1–0 victory over Barnet at Grosvenor Vale. In March 2022, Browne scored three goals in two games, with a goal away to Maidenhead United and a brace in a 3–2 win over Weymouth. He ended the 2021–22 season with six goals in 29 games.

On 14 October 2022, Browne joined league rivals Woking for an undisclosed fee, scoring seven goals in 13 league games early in Wealdstone's season. He scored 13 goals from 31 appearances in the remainder of the 2022–23 campaign, helping Woking to a fourth-place finish. He featured 22 times in the 2023–24 season, including in the final day victory over AFC Fylde that secured safety from relegation. Following their final-day survival, he was offered a new contract by Woking.

=== Barnet ===
On 14 May 2024, Browne joined National League rivals Barnet on a two-year deal. He scored seven goals in 30 matches across the 2024–25 campaign as the club secured promotion back into the Football League as National League champions. He featured 14 times in the 2025–26 season, and was not retained at the end of his contract.

=== Chelmsford City ===
On 29 May 2026, Browne signed a two-year deal with National League South club Chelmsford City, citing the winning culture that head of football John Still and manager Mark Cooper were trying to instill at the club. He scored on his debut for the Clarets in a 1–1 draw at Hemel Hempstead Town on 8 August.

== International career ==
Browne made his international début for Antigua and Barbuda at the Sir Vivian Richards Stadium on 10 June 2015, coming on as a 66th-minute substitute for Keiran Murtagh in a 4–1 defeat to Saint Lucia in the second round of 2018 FIFA World Cup CONCACAF qualification. His second cap and first international start came in the second leg, where he was substituted in the 46th-minute in a 4–1 win; Antigua won 5–4 on aggregate, and advanced to the third round. He scored his first international goal on 21 March 2018, opening the scoring in a 3–2 friendly win over Bermuda.

== Style of play ==
On signing for Aldershot Town, manager Barry Smith said, "Rhys fulfils everything that we're looking for in a wide player – he's quick, he's got a trick, he's enthusiastic and has had a good upbringing in football. When you see someone as exciting as Rhys you want to have these type of players in your squad". Yeovil manager Darren Way commented that "Rhys is technically a very, very gifted player and someone I've been aware of for the last two years. He likes to get the ball to feet, be positive in one-on-one situations and he's got a good end product in the final third".

== Personal life ==
Browne is the son of former Yeovil Town footballer Steve Browne.

== Career statistics ==
=== Club ===
As of end of 2025–26 season

Appearances and goals by club, season and competition
Club	Season	League			FA Cup		League Cup		Other		Total	
Club	Season	Division	Apps	Goals	Apps	Goals	Apps	Goals	Apps	Goals	Apps	Goals
Charlton Athletic	2014–15	Championship	0	0	0	0	0	0	—		0	0
VCD Athletic (loan)	2014–15	Isthmian League; Premier Division	3	1	0	0	—		—		3	1
Aldershot Town	2015–16	National League	37	6	3	1	—		1 (Note: Appearance(s) in FA Trophy)	0	41	7
Grimsby Town	2016–17	League Two	5	0	1	0	1	0	1 (Note: Appearance(s) in EFL Trophy)	0	8	0
Macclesfield Town (loan)	2016–17	National League	17	2	—		—		7	4	24	6
Yeovil Town	2017–18	League Two	35	4	2	0	1	0	4	2	42	6
Yeovil Town	2018–19	League Two	28	1	1	0	0	0	1	0	30	1
Yeovil Town	Total		63	5	3	0	1	0	5	2	72	7
Port Vale	2019–20	League Two	11	0	1	0	0	0	3	1	15	1
Wealdstone	2020–21	National League	1	0	0	0	—		0	0	1	0
Sutton United	2020–21	National League	12	0	0	0	—		2	0	14	0
Wealdstone	2021–22	National League	29	6	0	0	—		0	0	29	6
Wealdstone	2022–23	National League	13	7	0	0	—		0	0	13	7
Wealdstone	Total		42	13	0	0	0	0	0	0	42	13
Woking	2022–23	National League	28	13	2	0	—		1	0	31	13
Woking	2023–24	National League	19	2	2	0	—		1	2	22	4
Woking	Total		47	15	4	0	—		2	2	53	17
Barnet	2024–25	National League	29	7	0	0	—		1	1	30	8
Barnet	2025–26	League Two	13	0	0	0	1	1	0	0	14	1
Barnet	Total		42	7	0	0	1	1	1	1	44	9
Chelmsford City	2026–27	National League South	0	0	0	0	—		0	0	0	0
Career total			280	49	12	1	3	1	22	10	317	61

=== International ===
As of match played 18 November 2023.

Appearances and goals by national team and year
National team	Year	Apps	Goals
Antigua and Barbuda	2015	2	0
Antigua and Barbuda	2016	4	0
Antigua and Barbuda	2018	4	1
Antigua and Barbuda	2021	2	1
Antigua and Barbuda	2023	1	0
Total		13	2

As of match played 8 June 2021. Antigua & Barbuda score listed first, score column indicates score after each Browne goal.

International goals by date, venue, cap, opponent, score, result and competition
No.	Date	Venue	Cap	Opponent	Score	Result	Competition
1	21 March 2018	Sir Vivian Richards Stadium, North Sound, Antigua & Barbuda	7	Bermuda	1–0	3–2	Friendly
2	4 June 2021	Sir Vivian Richards Stadium, North Sound, Antigua & Barbuda	11	Grenada	1–0	1–0	2022 FIFA World Cup qualification

== Honours ==
Norwich City Youth

- FA Youth Cup: 2012–13
- Norfolk Senior Cup: 2012–13

Macclesfield Town

- FA Trophy runner-up: 2016–17

Sutton United

- National League: 2020–21

Barnet

- National League: 2024–25
