= Jordan McFarlane-Archer =

English footballer (born 1993)

Personal information
- Full name: Jordan Junior McFarlane-Archer
- Date of birth: 11 November 1993 (age 32)
- Place of birth: Bedworth, England
- Height: 6 ft 3 in (1.90 m)
- Position: Forward

Youth career
- –2012: Chasetown

Senior career*
Years	Team	Apps	(Gls)
2012	Chasetown	7	(0)
2013	Coleshill Town	7	(1)
2013	Cradley Town		
2013–2014	Tipton Town		
2014–2015	Tividale		
2015	Redditch United		
2015	→ Boldmere St. Michaels (loan)		
2015–2016	Bedworth United	34	(16)
2016–2017	Stourbridge		
2017–2018	Chester	21	(4)
2018–2019	Bury	0	(0)
2018	→ Maidenhead United (loan)	8	(0)
2018–2019	→ Southport (loan)	21	(4)
2019–2020	Port Vale	3	(0)
2020	→ Stockport County (loan)	3	(0)
2020	Boston United	3	(0)
2020–2024	Southport	85	(30)
2025	Stourbridge	1	(0)
Total		193	(55)
- * Club domestic league appearances and goals

Jordan Junior McFarlane-Archer (born 11 November 1993) is an English former professional footballer who played as a forward.

McFarlane-Archer spent his early career with a multitude of non-League clubs, including: Chasetown, Coleshill Town, Cradley Town, Tipton Town, Tividale, Redditch United, Boldmere St. Michaels, Bedworth United and Stourbridge. He turned professional after being signed to Chester in October 2017 and then entered the English Football League with a move to Bury in July 2018. From Bury, he was loaned out to Maidenhead United and Southport, before joining Port Vale after Bury were expelled from the Football League in August 2019. Having failed to break into the Vale first team, he was loaned to Stockport County in January 2020. He signed for Boston United in September 2020 and moved on to Southport two months later. He spent a year out of the game before he signed with Stourbridge in August 2025.

== Career ==
=== Early career ===
Archer spent time in the youth team at Chasetown, before scoring on his debut for the reserves in November 2011, and making his Northern Premier League Premier Division debut in a 1–0 defeat to Marine on 3 March 2012. After eight appearances for the "Scholars" in the 2011–12 relegation season, Archer moved on to Coleshill Town, making his debut for the "Colemen" in a 2–0 victory over Alvechurch at Pack Meadow on 6 August 2013. He made a total of seven Midland Football Alliance appearances and one FA Cup qualification appearance, scoring his first goal in senior football with a penalty in a 4–0 win at Continental Star on 14 August. He went on to play for Cradley Town, Tipton Town and Tividale. He joined Redditch United on 4 June 2015. However, he struggled to get games for the "Reds" as Luke Shearer and Daniel Dubidat were preferred up front by manager Liam McDonald, and he was loaned out to Boldmere St. Michaels. Archer moved on to Bedworth United in September 2015. Despite him scoring 16 goals from 34 league games, the "Greenbacks" were relegated out of the Southern League Premier Division at the end of the 2015–16 season. The Warwickshire-based club were placed in the Northern Premier League Division One South for the 2016–17 season. He joined Stourbridge on 6 November 2016. He worked at a bank during his time at Stourbridge. Stourbridge reached the Northern Premier League Premier Division play-offs and he scored in their play-off semi-final victory over Workington at the War Memorial Athletic Ground. However, they were beaten by Spennymoor Town in the final. During his 11 months with the "Glassboys" he scored 22 goals in 51 appearances and spent a week on trial at Walsall in summer 2017. On 24 October 2017, he turned professional after being signed to a two-year contract by National League side Chester. "Blues" manager Marcus Bignot said that he believed Archer could play in the Football League.

=== Bury ===
On 12 July 2018, Archer signed a two-year contract with League Two side Bury after being bought for an undisclosed fee (reported to be around £20,000). "Shakers" manager Ryan Lowe said that Archer was "a wanted man" and praised sporting director Les Dykes and chairman Stewart Day for completing the deal. On 31 August, he joined National League side Maidenhead United on a two-month loan at York Road. He played eight games for Alan Devonshire's "Magpies". On 9 November, he joined National League North side Southport on a two-month loan deal at Haig Avenue. "Sandgrounders" manager Liam Watson went on to extend Archer's loan until the end of the 2018–19 season. He won the Liverpool Senior Cup with Southport, after they beat Prescot Cables on penalties after drawing the final 0–0. He was not paid for the last five months of his time at Gigg Lane and had to rely on 50% of his wages being paid by the Professional Footballers' Association.

=== Port Vale ===
Bury were expelled from the English Football League on 30 August 2019, and Archer signed a one-year deal with League Two club Port Vale the following day. He was signed by manager John Askey to provide competition for strikers Tom Pope, Richie Bennett and Mark Cullen. He made his debut for the "Valiants" on 3 September, coming on as a 60th-minute substitute for Tom Pope in an EFL Trophy tie with Shrewsbury Town at Vale Park; he went on to score the winning goal on 75 minutes as Vale came from behind to win 2–1. He dislocated his shoulder four days later, but rejected a shoulder operation in favour of physiotherapy as he wanted to avoid a lengthy spell on the sidelines recovering from surgery.

On 17 January 2020, he joined National League play-off chasing side Stockport County on a one-month loan. Manager Jim Gannon said that he signed Archer to help arrest the "Hatters" dip in form, saying "I believe the new signings will add extra dimensions to us, add physical presence and the quality that has gone missing". However, he was limited to just three appearances due to injury. Port Vale released him at the end of the 2019–20 season.

=== Non-League ===
On 4 September 2020, he signed with National League North club Boston United. He made three substitute appearance and did not start a game for the "Pilgrims". On 9 November 2020, he joined Southport for an undisclosed fee, signing a contract to run until May 2022. He scored four goals from eight league games before the 2020–21 season was curtailed due to the COVID-19 pandemic in England. He scored 17 goals in 43 games during the 2021–22 campaign. He signed a two-year contract extension in April 2022, much to manager Liam Watson's delight. He scored ten goals from 33 league games during the 2022–23 season. He made five appearances in the 2023–24 campaign.

On 6 August 2025, after a year out of football, Archer signed for Southern League Premier Division Central club Stourbridge.

== Style of play ==
In June 2015, Redditch United manager Liam McDonald said that Archer is "strong and fast and knows where goal is."

== Personal life ==
His younger brother, Cameron Archer, is also a footballer for Southampton in the EFL Championship. He is of Jamaican descent through his mother.

== Career statistics ==
Appearances and goals by club, season and competition
Club	Season	League			FA Cup		League Cup		Other		Total	
Club	Season	Division	Apps	Goals	Apps	Goals	Apps	Goals	Apps	Goals	Apps	Goals
Chasetown	2011–12	Northern Premier League; Premier Division	7	0	0	0	0	0	1 (Note: Appearance(s) in the Walsall Senior Cup.)	0	8	0
Coleshill Town	2013–14	Midland Alliance	7	1	1	0	—		0	0	8	0
Bedworth United	2015–16	Southern League; Premier Division	34	16	0	0	1	0	1 (Note: Appearance(s) in the FA Trophy.)	0	36	16
Chester	2017–18	National League	21	4	0	0	—		0	0	21	4
Bury	2018–19	League Two	0	0	0	0	0	0	0	0	0	0
Maidenhead United (loan)	2018–19	National League	8	0	0	0	—		0	0	8	0
Southport (loan)	2018–19	National League North	21	4	2	0	—		0	0	23	4
Port Vale	2019–20	League Two	3	0	0	0	—		5 (Note: Appearance(s)in the EFL Trophy.)	1	8	1
Stockport County (loan)	2019–20	National League	3	0	0	0	—		0	0	3	0
Boston United	2020–21	National League North	3	0	0	0	—		0	0	3	0
Southport	2020–21	National League North	8	4	0	0	—		4	0	12	4
Southport	2021–22	National League North	39	15	1	0	—		3	2	43	17
Southport	2022–23	National League North	33	10	0	0	—		1	0	34	10
Southport	2023–24	National League North	5	1	0	0	—		0	0	5	1
Southport	Total		85	30	1	0	0	0	8	2	94	32
Stourbridge	2025–26	Southern League; Premier Division	1	0	0	0	0	0	0	0	1	0
Career total			193	55	4	0	1	0	15	3	213	58

== Honours ==
Southport

- Liverpool Senior Cup: 2019
