= Jonny Maddison =

English footballer

Personal information
- Full name: Jonathan Geoffrey Maddison
- Date of birth: 4 September 1994 (age 32)
- Place of birth: Chester-le-Street, England
- Height: 6 ft 4 in (1.93 m)
- Position: Goalkeeper

Youth career
- –2012: Sunderland

Senior career*
Years	Team	Apps	(Gls)
2012–2013	Sunderland	0	(0)
2013	→ Crawley Town (loan)	0	(0)
2013–2014	Crawley Town	0	(0)
2014–2016	Leicester City	0	(0)
2015	→ Leamington (loan)	9	(0)
2016–2018	Yeovil Town	15	(0)
2018–2019	Darlington	28	(0)
2019–2020	Port Vale	0	(0)
Total		52	(0)
- * Club domestic league appearances and goals

Jonathan Geoffrey Maddison (born 4 September 1994) is an English former professional footballer who played as a goalkeeper and now coaches at the Sunderland Academy. He made 61 league and cup appearances in a seven-year playing career.

He began his career at Sunderland before joining Crawley Town in May 2013 following a spell on loan. He joined Leicester City a year later and made his debut in senior football on loan at Leamington in March 2015. He signed with Yeovil Town in July 2016 and made his debut in the English Football League in April 2017. However, he left the club in June 2018 to play first-team football at non-League Darlington. Upon signing with Port Vale in July 2019, he returned to the Football League but did not make a league appearance during his one season at the club.

== Career ==
=== Sunderland ===
Maddison was awarded a two-year scholarship at the Sunderland Academy in 2011. On 29 January 2013, Maddison signed for League Two club Crawley Town on loan until the end of the 2012–13 season; "Red Devils" manager Richie Barker said that he would provide competition for Paul Jones.

=== Crawley Town ===
In May 2013, having been released by Sunderland, Maddison signed permanently for Crawley Town on a one-year contract, but failed to make an appearance for the Sussex club before being released at the end of the 2013–14 season.

=== Leicester City ===
Maddison then joined the development side of Premier League club Leicester City. In March 2015, Maddison joined National League North side Leamington on loan until the end of the 2014–15 season. He made his debut in senior football for the "Brakes" on 14 March, in a 1–0 defeat at Gainsborough Trinity. He made eight further appearances for Leamington, becoming the seventh goalkeeper to feature for them during the campaign as the club suffered relegation into the seventh tier.

=== Yeovil Town ===
On 14 July 2016, Maddison signed for League Two side Yeovil Town on a one-year contract. He made his Yeovil debut on 30 August, in a 4–3 victory over Portsmouth in an EFL Trophy fixture at Huish Park. On 14 April 2017, following an injury to first-choice keeper Artur Krysiak, Maddison made his English Football League debut for Yeovil at Newport County. In June 2017, after making 11 appearances in his first season with the "Glovers", Maddison signed a new two-year contract with the club.

He had to wait until another injury to Krysiak in February of the 2017–18 season before playing a first-team game, though he won praise from manager Darren Way for his performance in a 2–0 home win over Barnet on 13 February; Way stated that "he wanted to move in the window but this is his opportunity; you're judged on your reputation and his reputation with the supporters singing his name is very high". He made a total of ten league appearances during the campaign before leaving Yeovil by mutual consent on 26 June 2018.

=== Darlington ===
On 26 June 2018, Maddison joined National League North club Darlington. Manager Tommy Wright described his arrival as "a real coup for the club". He featured 29 times in the 2018–19 campaign.

=== Port Vale ===
Maddison signed a one-year deal with League Two side Port Vale on 31 July 2019, after impressing manager John Askey on trial; he was expected to provide cover for Player of the Year winner Scott Brown. He made his debut for the "Valiants" in a 2–1 victory over Newcastle United U21 in an EFL Trophy group stage game at Vale Park on 11 November. This would prove to be his only appearance for the club and he was released at the end of the 2019–20 season.

== Coaching life ==
Maddison was unable to find a new club during the COVID-19 pandemic in England, and instead spent two years working as an operations manager for Amazon, before taking up a coaching position at the Academy at Middlesbrough. He later began coaching at the Sunderland Academy.

== Career statistics ==
Appearances and goals by club, season and competition
Club	Season	League			FA Cup		League Cup		Other		Total	
Club	Season	Division	Apps	Goals	Apps	Goals	Apps	Goals	Apps	Goals	Apps	Goals
Sunderland	2012–13	Premier League	0	0	0	0	0	0	—		0	0
Crawley Town (loan)	2012–13	League One	0	0	0	0	0	0	0	0	0	0
Crawley Town	2013–14	League One	0	0	0	0	0	0	0	0	0	0
Leicester City	2014–15	Premier League	0	0	0	0	0	0	—		0	0
Leicester City	2015–16	Premier League	0	0	0	0	0	0	—		0	0
Leamington (loan)	2014–15	National League North	9	0	0	0	—		0	0	9	0
Yeovil Town	2016–17	League Two	5	0	0	0	0	0	6 (Note: Appearance(s) in EFL Trophy)	0	11	0
Yeovil Town	2017–18	League Two	10	0	0	0	0	0	1	0	11	0
Yeovil Town	Total		15	0	0	0	0	0	7	0	22	0
Darlington	2018–19	National League North	28	0	1	0	—		0	0	29	0
Port Vale	2019–20	League Two	0	0	0	0	0	0	1	0	1	0
Career total			52	0	1	0	0	0	8	0	61	0
