= Jake Taylor (footballer, born 1998) =

English footballer (born 1998)

Personal information
- Full name: Jake Jon Taylor
- Date of birth: 8 September 1998 (age 28)
- Place of birth: Manchester, England
- Height: 5 ft 10 in (1.78 m)
- Position: Midfielder

Team information
- Current team: Southport

Youth career
- 20??–2014: Manchester United
- 2015–2019: Nottingham Forest

Senior career*
Years	Team	Apps	(Gls)
2019–2021	Nottingham Forest	0	(0)
2019–2020	→ Port Vale (loan)	18	(5)
2020–2021	→ Scunthorpe United (loan)	13	(0)
2021–2022	Port Vale	23	(1)
2022–2024	Morecambe	51	(1)
2025	Truro City	8	(0)
2026–	Southport	8	(0)
- * Club domestic league appearances and goals as of 18:56, 1 May 2026 (UTC)

Jake Jon Taylor (born 8 September 1998) is an English professional footballer who plays as a midfielder for National League North club Southport.

Taylor began his career at Nottingham Forest, though he never made a first-team appearance. He spent time on loan at Port Vale and Scunthorpe United before joining Port Vale on a permanent transfer in January 2021. He helped the club to win promotion out of League Two via the play-offs in 2022. He was sold to Morecambe in July 2022. He spent two seasons with Morecambe and then spent a year out of the game before joining Truro City in August 2025. He moved on to Southport in January 2026.

== Career ==
=== Nottingham Forest ===
Taylor was a pupil at Moorside High School in Swinton, Greater Manchester and was associated with Manchester United as a schoolboy until he was not offered a scholarship at Old Trafford at the age of 16. In July 2015 he began a two-year apprenticeship at Nottingham Forest's youth team. On 30 August 2019, he joined EFL League Two side Port Vale on loan after impressing manager John Askey in training games during a trial spell. Taylor said that "Port Vale have strong links with Forest, as you have seen with Adam Crookes and also Toby Edser came in. Phil Sproson is good friends with the academy manager Gary Brazil so the link is there. They have shown an interest and I have jumped at it."

He made his debut the following day, coming on as a 67th-minute substitute for Cristian Montaño in a 1–0 win over Cambridge United at Vale Park. He later said that "I knew it would be physical but I think I have dealt with that quite well. Probably the speed of the game has surprised me." On 24 September, he scored his first goal in senior football in a 3–2 victory at Macclesfield Town in the EFL Trophy. He scored his first league goal four days later, bending the ball into the top corner from the edge of the penalty area in a 3–3 draw at Leyton Orient. On 2 November, he scored the only goal of the game at local rivals Crewe Alexandra. He picked up an injury early in January, but nevertheless had his loan spell extended until the end of the 2019–20 season. The loan deal was extended after Forest rebuffed two transfer bids from the Vale. However, he was unable to add to his tally of seven goals in 25 appearances as the league was ended early due to the COVID-19 pandemic in England.

On 1 October 2020, Taylor joined League Two club Scunthorpe United on loan for the remainder of the 2020–21 season. Taylor was recalled from his loan at Glanford Park in January, having made 14 appearances for Neil Cox's "Iron".

=== Port Vale ===
On 11 January 2021, Taylor signed a permanent deal with Port Vale on a three-and-a-half-year deal. Rather than pay Nottingham Forest a transfer fee, the club agreed to a large sell-on clause. New manager Darrell Clarke dropped Taylor from the starting line-up after saying he needed to "add that bit of steel to his game", though added that "I see him having a bright future". He was sidelined with injury in early April, having scored once from 13 appearances for the club in the second half of the 2020–21 season. His agent, Phil Sproson, commented that "he has to have a good pre-season and then see what develops... he just needs to recapture the form he had when he first came on loan".

He missed the pre-season and the start of the 2021–22 regular season with a thigh injury. He made 11 appearances before a reoccurrence of a quad injury saw ruled out of action "for a substantial time" in January. He returned to action on 15 April, earning praise from interim manager Andy Crosby for his performance after coming on as a 55th-minute substitute in a 1–0 win at Hartlepool United. He started in the play-off final at Wembley Stadium as Vale secured promotion with a 3–0 victory over Mansfield Town; Michael Baggaley of The Sentinel wrote that "[Taylor] used the ball well, spreading play with some pin-point crossfield passes".

=== Morecambe ===
Taylor was reportedly a target of Morecambe in June 2022, with manager Derek Adams looking to sign him on a "bargain deal" to replace the departed Aaron Wildig. The transfer was confirmed on 8 July, with Morecambe paying an undisclosed fee and Taylor signing a two-year deal and stating that "I just wanted to go to a club where I felt wanted, play regularly and express myself". He missed two months of the season after picking up a muscle injury against Accrington Stanley at the start of October. He made 15 starts and twelve substitute appearances throughout the 2022–23 campaign as Morecambe were relegated out of League One. He played 32 games in the 2023–24 campaign, scoring one goal, and was not retained at the end of his contract. He spent the 2024–25 season without a club as he struggled to overcome persistent injuries.

=== Truro City ===
Taylor signed a short-term deal with newly promoted National League club Truro City, managed by former Port Vale boss John Askey, on 6 August 2025. On 19 December, he departed the club by mutual consent.

=== Southport ===
On 15 January 2026, Taylor joined Southport of the National League North. He ruptured his thigh and set up a GoFundMe campaign to raise funds to pay for his surgery.

== Style of play ==
Taylor describes himself as a "ball-playing midfielder", though can also play at left-back.

== Career statistics ==
As of match played 21 February 2026

Appearances and goals by club, season and competition
Club	Season	League			FA Cup		EFL Cup		Other		Total	
Club	Season	Division	Apps	Goals	Apps	Goals	Apps	Goals	Apps	Goals	Apps	Goals
Nottingham Forest	2019–20	Championship	0	0	0	0	0	0	—		0	0
Nottingham Forest	2020–21	Championship	0	0	0	0	0	0	—		0	0
Nottingham Forest	Total		0	0	0	0	0	0	0	0	0	0
Scunthorpe United (loan)	2020–21	League Two	13	0	1	0	—		0	0	14	0
Port Vale (loan)	2019–20	League Two	18	5	3	0	0	0	4 (Note: Appearance(s) in EFL Trophy)	2	25	7
Port Vale	2020–21	League Two	12	1	—		—		1	0	13	1
Port Vale	2021–22	League Two	11	0	1	0	0	0	6 (Note: 3 appearances in EFL Trophy and 3 appearances in League Two play-offs)	1	18	1
Port Vale	Total		41	6	4	0	0	0	11	3	56	9
Morecambe	2022–23	League One	23	0	0	0	2	0	2	0	27	0
Morecambe	2023–24	League Two	28	1	2	0	1	0	1	0	32	1
Morecambe	Total		51	1	2	0	3	0	3	0	59	1
Truro City	2025–26	National League	8	0	0	0	–		2 (Note: Appearance(s) in National League Cup)	0	10	0
Southport	2025–26	National League North	8	0	–		–		–		8	0
Southport	2026–27	National League North	0	0	0	0	–		0	0	0	0
Southport	Total		8	0	0	0	0	0	0	0	8	0
Career total			121	7	7	0	3	0	16	3	147	10

== Honours ==
Port Vale

- EFL League Two play-offs: 2022
