= Steve Browne =

English footballer (1964–2017)

Personal information
- Full name: Stephen Logan Browne
- Date of birth: 21 June 1964
- Place of birth: Hackney, England
- Date of death: 1 January 2017 (aged 52)
- Position: Midfielder

Youth career
- –1981: Charlton Athletic

Senior career*
Years	Team	Apps	(Gls)
1981–1982	Charlton Athletic	1	(0)
1983	Maidstone United	10	(0)
1988–1991	Wealdstone		
- Sutton United
1994–1995	Wealdstone		
1995–1996	Yeovil Town	27	(2)
1996	Hendon	4	(0)
1997–1998	Yeovil Town	41	(0)
1998–2003	Slough Town	30	(1)

Managerial career
- 1999–2003: Slough Town
- 2003–2004: Boreham Wood
- 2004–2005: Dover Athletic
- 2007–2008: Potters Bar Town
- 2008–2009: Enfield Town
- * Club domestic league appearances and goals

Stephen Logan Browne (21 June 1964 – 1 January 2017) was an English professional footballer who played as a midfielder in the English Football League for Charlton Athletic and in non-League football for Maidstone United, Wealdstone, Yeovil Town and Slough Town.

== Career ==
Browne joined Charlton Athletic as a youth player straight from school and made his first team debut as a 17-year-old against Wrexham in February 1982. He had a four-game spell at Isthmian League side Hendon at the start of 1996. He had a spell with Yeovil Town and was an integral part of the squad that gained promotion back to the Conference from the Isthmian League in the 1996–97 campaign under the tenure of Graham Roberts. He made a total of 88 appearances for the Glovers. In the early part of the 1998–99 season he signed for Slough Town and was player/assistant manager, where he linked up again with Graham Roberts. He made 45 appearances as a player before succeeding Roberts as manager after his departure in 1999. In October 2004 he was appointed manager of Isthmian League side Dover Athletic on a contract until the end of the 2005–06 season. He was sacked as manager of Dover in January 2005, following a takeover by Jim Parmenter as chairman and he was replaced by former boss Clive Walker. In June 2005 he took Dover to an industrial tribunal over his sacking, however, the dispute was settled a month later. He was appointed manager of Isthmian League Division One North side Potters Bar Town in May 2007 and remained there until December 2008 when he joined Enfield Town.

== Personal life ==
Browne died on in January 2017, at the age of 52, following a battle with bowel cancer. His son Rhys Browne is an Antigua and Barbuda international and also played in the English Football League.
