= 2019–20 Port Vale F.C. season =

Port Vale F.C.
2019–20 season
- Owner: Synsol Holdings Limited
- Chairperson/s: Carol and Kevin Shanahan (until 30 January); Carol Shanahan (from 30 January)
- Manager: John Askey
- Stadium: Vale Park
- League Two: 8th (1.54 points per game)
- FA Cup: Third Round (eliminated by Manchester City)
- EFL Cup: First Round (eliminated by Burton Albion)
- EFL Trophy: Third Round (eliminated by Salford City)
- Player of the Year: David Worrall
- Top goalscorer: League: Richie Bennett, Tom Pope (6 each); All: Tom Pope (10)
- Highest home attendance: 5,931 vs. Northampton Town, 10 August 2019
- Lowest home attendance: 571 vs. Newcastle United U21, 12 November 2019
- Average home league attendance: 4,862
- Biggest win: 3–0 vs. Colchester United, 15 February 2020
- Biggest defeat: 0–3 (twice), 1–4, 2–5
Home colours	Away colours

The 2019–20 season was Port Vale's 108th season of football in the English Football League, and third consecutive season in EFL League Two.

Manager John Askey reshaped the squad by letting 14 players go and bringing in 14 new signings. However, David Amoo was the only new player in the starting eleven for the season's opening game. They lost just one league game in six matches in August, though this was a heavy 5–2 defeat at Grimsby Town, and they also exited the EFL Cup in the first round. September saw them in indifferent form, as they picked up just one league win, though Vale did secure their place in the knockout stages of the EFL Trophy. October saw more promise as they picked up their first away win, though they were held to disappointing draws at home to struggling teams. They went on to claim five wins in six games in November, including a 1–0 victory at local rivals Crewe Alexandra and wins against Milton Keynes Dons and Cheltenham Town in the FA Cup. They drew four of their six games in December. However, they did win a penalty shoot-out to advance in the EFL Trophy before ending 2019 with a 2–0 win over league leaders Swindon Town.

Vale had a quiet January transfer window, with only one new arrival and no major departures. A highlight of the season came in the FA Cup third round, as a glamour tie at Premier League champions Manchester City ended in a 4–1 defeat. However, a 3–0 defeat to Salford City in the EFL Trophy was a less auspicious end to the club's cup interests. They went unbeaten throughout February, picking up wins over promotion rivals Northampton Town and Colchester United, to end the month in the play-off places. On 13 March, all EFL fixtures were suspended due to the COVID-19 pandemic in the United Kingdom. On 15 May, League Two clubs voted to end the season after 37 games, causing Vale to finish one place outside the play-offs.

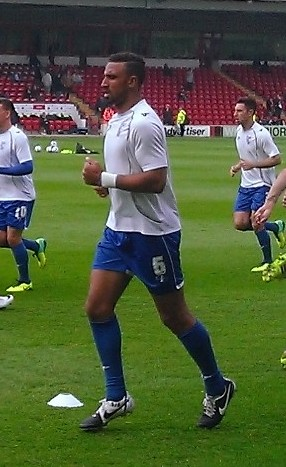
Club captain Leon Legge.

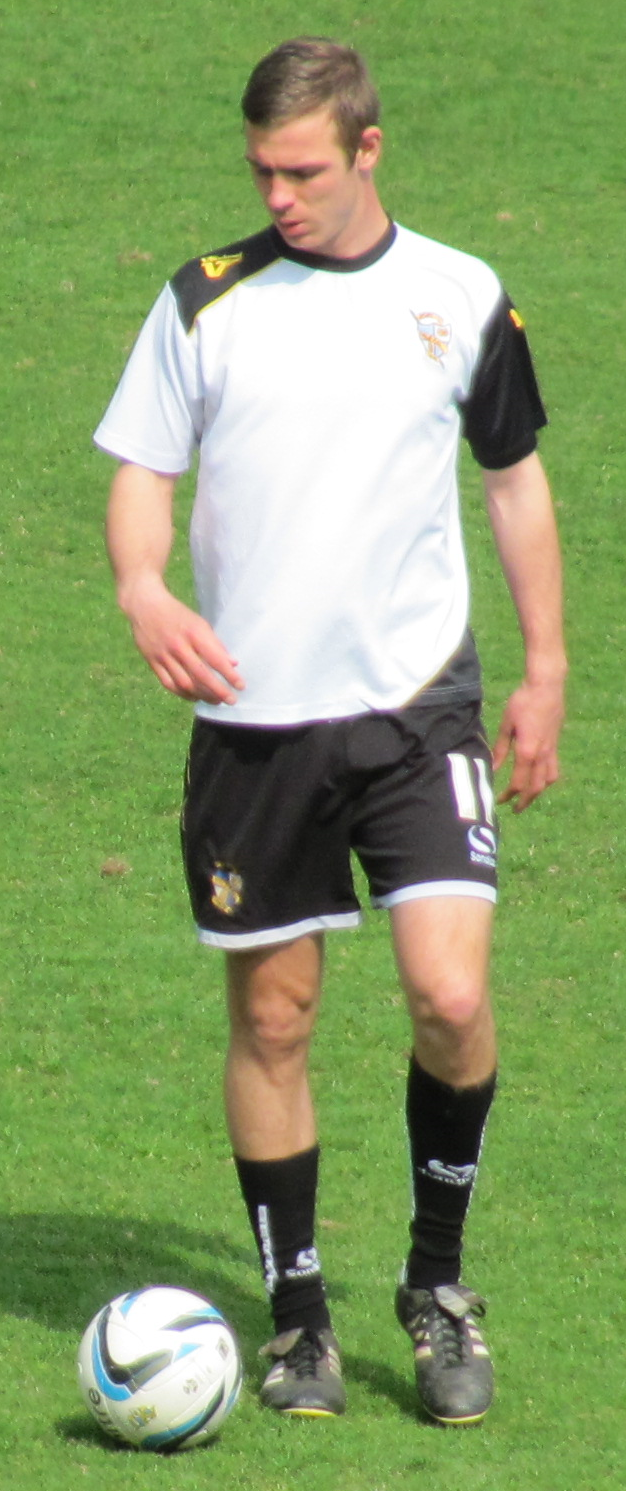
Tom Pope finished as top-scorer with 10 goals.

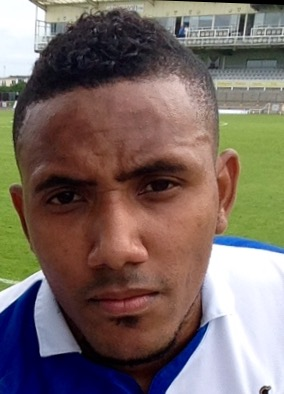
Cristian Montaño made 36 appearances.

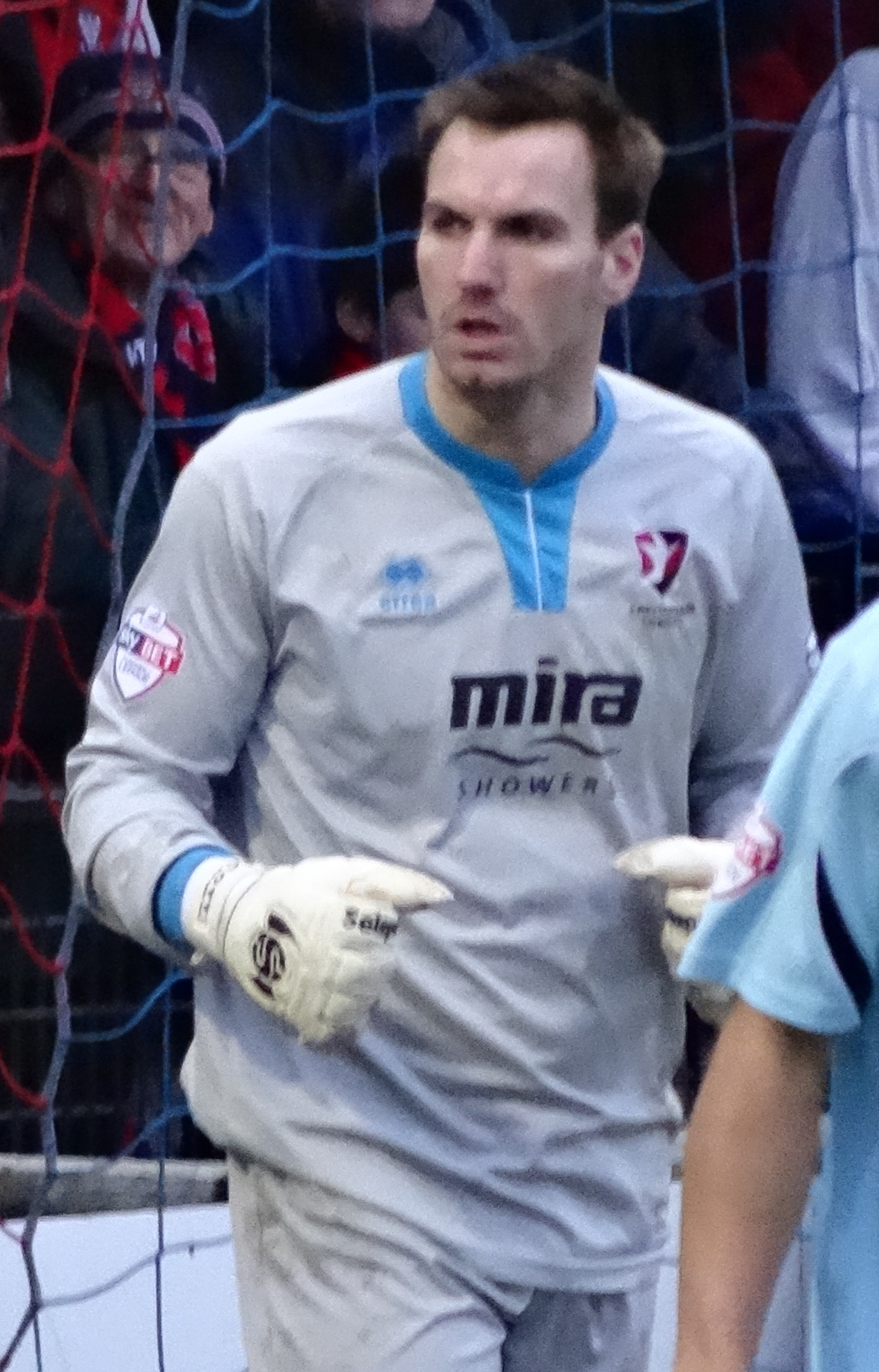
Goalkeeper Scott Brown played all but one of the club's games.

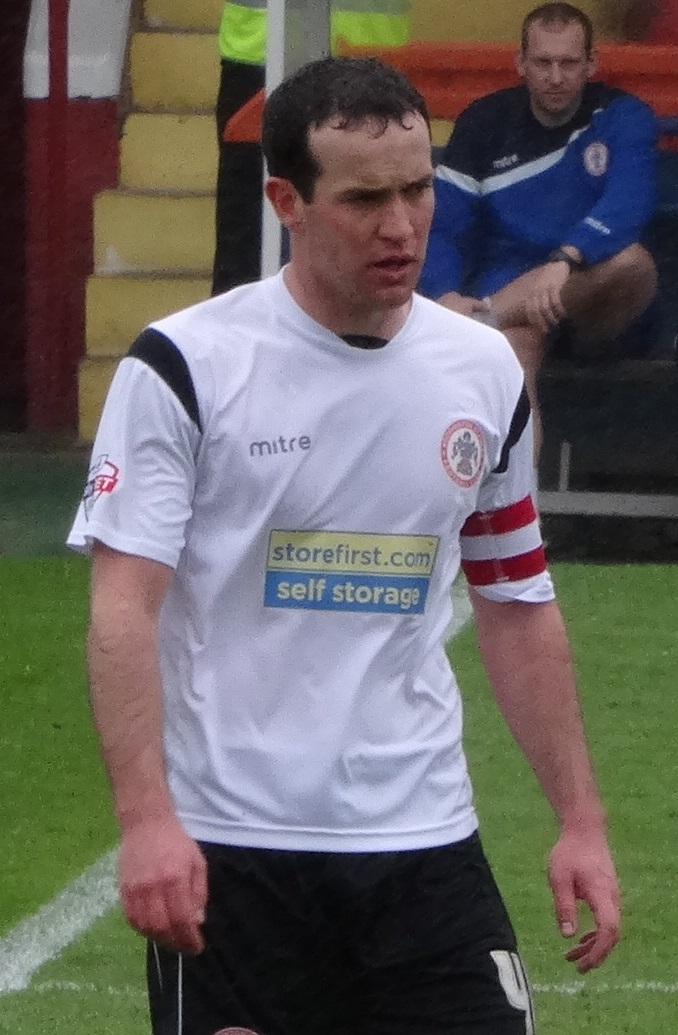
Luke Joyce was a joint-winner of the club's Players' Player of the Year award.

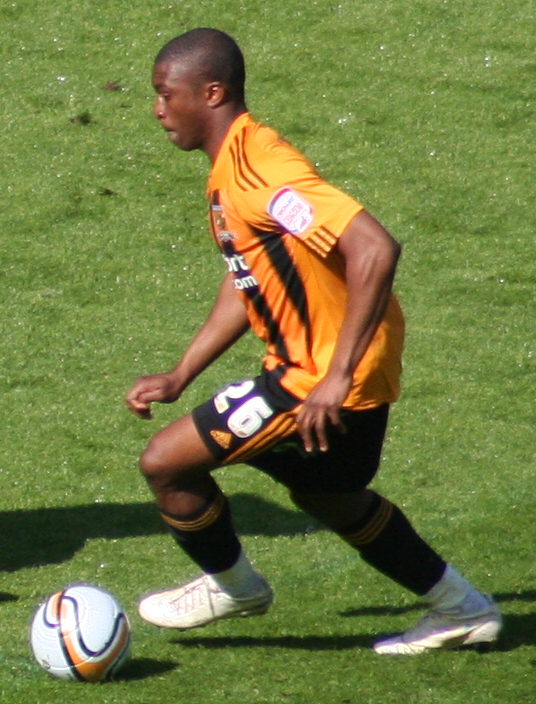
David Amoo had an inconsistent season, earning both plaudits and criticism.

== Overview ==
=== EFL League Two ===
Manager John Askey called for patience as he and new owners Carol and Kevin Shanahan tried to rebuild the club following Norman Smurthwaite's ownership. Though the budget was reduced he aimed to have a smaller and more competitive squad. His first summer signing was midfielder Scott Burgess, released from Bury despite an impressive loan spell at York City; the 21-year-old had previously played on loan at Macclesfield Town in Askey's National League title-winning season. He next signed Adam Crookes, a 21-year-old defender who had been released by Nottingham Forest despite impressing whilst on loan at Vale in the second half of the 2018–19 season. He then signed 25-year-old Kieran Kennedy, "a footballing centre-half" who turned down a new deal at Wrexham in order to return to the English Football League. Big target man striker Richie Bennett then joined, having been let go by Carlisle United. The signings of 27-year-old former Blackpool striker Mark Cullen and 25-year-old former youth team midfielder Ryan Lloyd were confirmed on 26 June. On 8 July, winger David Amoo arrived on a one-year deal after rejecting a new contract with Cambridge United; this was the first signing to meet Askey's priorities of bringing in a winger, a right-back and a backup goalkeeper. Askey also evaluated five trialists in pre-season friendlies: 19-year-old Bradford (Park Avenue) midfielder Alex Hurst, former Darlington goalkeeper Jonny Maddison, former Millwall and Reading right-back Shaun Cummings, former Yeovil Town winger Rhys Browne and former Coventry City striker Kwame Thomas. Cummings left without a contract as Askey instead again signed another of his former Macclesfield Town players, 23-year-old Callum Evans, who – like Lloyd – had been released by Macclesfield boss Sol Campbell. Bookmakers predicted a mid-table finish for the club. The club kit was reverted to Erreà manufacturers and the shirt sponsors were revealed as Synectics Solutions, the company owned by chairpersons Carol and Kevin Shanahan. The black and gold away kit was launched in tribute to the protestors who helped to oust Smurthwaite. As pre-season drew to a close the club took a week long trip to Scotland. Trialist winger Rhys Browne, yet another former Macclesfield player, became the ninth summer signing on the day of the club's final pre-season friendly. Signing number ten was the new back-up goalkeeper, 24-year-old Jonny Maddison, who had impressed on trial. A third of the five trialists was also signed. However, Alex Hurst was immediately loaned back to Bradford (Park Avenue) to gain match experience.

Vale opened the season with a creditable 1–1 draw at Colchester United, having had a fifth-minute Tom Pope penalty cancelled out by a Luke Norris goal just before half-time. Connell Rawlinson left Vale for National League side Notts County on a free transfer on 5 August, having been transfer-listed by Askey in pre-season. The first game at Vale Park of the Shanahan era came against Northampton Town, and Amoo opened his account for the club with a header before "Cobblers" midfielder Ryan Watson levelled the score at 1–1 just before half-time; Askey said the players performed well but needed to show more belief. On 17 August, Vale travelled to Moor Lane for their first ever game against Salford City and came close to recording their first win of the season after Bennett put them ahead with nine minutes to go, only for Jake Beesley to level the game at 1–1 in the third minute of stoppage-time. Four days later Vale recorded their first ever victory over Forest Green Rovers; James Gibbons went from hero to villain within the opening six minutes as he crossed for Bennett to score only to give away the ball soon after the restart to gift Joseph Mills the equalising goal, and then Cristian Montaño crossed the ball to Amoo for the game's winning goal on 34 minutes. However, they ended the week with a their first league loss of the season, a heavy 5–2 defeat at Grimsby Town that Askey described as a "reality check". Askey boosted his squad with a triple signing, bringing in 29-year-old former Notts County defender Shaun Brisley, 25-year-old former Bury striker Jordan McFarlane-Archer, and 20-year-old midfielder Jake Taylor on loan from Nottingham Forest. Vale ended the month with a dour 1–0 victory over Cambridge United, Amoo's 84th-minute cross having been bungled over the goalline by a United defender.

On 3 September, it was confirmed that the club had come up with an agreement to cancel Ben Whitfield's contract, who was not in Askey's first-team plans. Five days later Vale fell to a narrow 1–0 defeat at second-placed Newport County; Jamille Matt heading home on 77 minutes after Corey Whitely found room to cross on the Vale's left on 77 minutes. On 14 September, Vale suffered three first-half injuries at home to pre-season promotion favourites Plymouth Argyle, but rallied to a 1–0 victory after Nathan Smith scored the game's only goal on 76 minutes. Another tough fixture saw them travel to league leaders Exeter City just three days later. They managed to hold their hosts up until the 81st-minute, when Ryan Bowman netted the opening goal of a 2–0 loss. Askey experimented with two strikers at home to a strong Mansfield Town club, though his team were fortunate to grab a 2–2 draw after Smith scored a stoppage-time equaliser; Askey went on to bemoan the officials and the Mansfield striker Danny Rose for winning a penalty with a dive. The next trip was to National League champions Leyton Orient and had to settle for a points after sharing six goals, coming from behind to dominate the first half but then lose the lead twice in the second half.

Vale launched a controversial new commercial campaign in October, offering youngsters the chance to swap Stoke City shirts and tickets for Vale ones, which was a response to Stoke's popular 'City 7s' scheme which handed seven year-olds a shirt and match tickets for a game at the Bet365 Stadium. Back on the pitch, Askey signed versatile midfielder Will Atkinson on a short-term deal following injuries to Tom Conlon and Manny Oyeleke. He replaced a suspended Gibbons at right-back at home to Morecambe (a club record 11 years and 11 months after his last game for the club) and though Vale trailed 1–0 at half-time, the visitors were down to ten men and a superb Luke Joyce strike after the break started a comeback and Vale ended up 3–1 winners after a brace from Pope. However, they then fell to a disappointing 2–1 defeat at Macclesfield Town after losing an early lead; Askey had experimented with a midfield diamond against his former club, going 4–3–3 to 4–4–2. A drab 1–1 home draw with 23rd-placed Stevenage followed despite Vale taking an early lead with an excellent team goal. Three days later they won 2–1 at second-placed Bradford City, with substitute Atkinson scoring his first goal for the club to win the game three minutes into injury-time. They again failed to build on a positive result and performance though as they then grounded out a 0–0 home draw with a poor Oldham Athletic side.

Vale travelled up the A500 to face local rivals Crewe Alexandra on 2 November, who were top of the table and managed to edge a tight game 1–0 with a strike from Taylor on 61 minutes. A fortnight later and they were one goal down at home to managerless Carlisle United within the opening minute, but then came from behind to win the game 2–1 with a late strike from substitute Cullen. However, they then lost a one-goal lead at Scunthorpe United to lose 2–1, with in-form David Worrall also picking up Vale's first red card of the season for scuffling with Matty Lund after the final whistle.

Vale's unbeaten home league record came to an end on 7 December, as struggling Walsall engineered a 1–0 victory with the only goal of the game coming within the first minute of the second half; Conlon was also sent off. The following week they held Crawley Town to a 0–0 draw at Broadfield Stadium. Third-place Cheltenham Town then visited Burslem and shared two goals in an exciting 1–1 draw. Vale seemed to be heading for a 2–0 Boxing Day victory away at Mansfield Town after goals from centre-backs Smith and Legge, but mistakes from full-backs Montaño and Gibbons allowed Mansfield to finish level at 2–2. League leaders Swindon Town were the visitors for the final game of the calendar year and Vale managed an impressive 2–0 victory, ending a run of six games without a win.

Vale's habit of losing points from winning positions was demonstrated again on New Year's Day as they blew a half-time lead to draw 2–2 with Macclesfield Town. Having been eliminated from two cup competitions in a week, they went to second-bottom Stevenage on 11 January and seemed to heading for a goalless draw until Conlon was fouled in the penalty box, leaving Pope to score the game's only goal from the penalty spot on 88 minutes. However, three days later they lost 2–1 at Morecambe after going two goals down within the opening 12 minutes, who had been bottom of the table before Stevanage's defeat to Vale; Gibbons scored the consolation goal, his first goal in senior football. They returned to Vale Park to play out-of-form Leyton Orient and won 1–0 thanks for a strike from Amoo, closing the gap to the play-offs to three points. However, they then fell to a 3–0 defeat at league leaders Swindon Town after losing Smith to injury on 29 minutes. Vale then beat second-placed Exeter City 3–1 at home after turning round a half-time deficit thanks to a brace from Bennett. The January transfer window was a quiet one for the "Valiants", though Askey did re-sign defender Mitch Clark on loan from Leicester City. The board of directors was also reshuffled, with Carol Shanahan named as sole chair whilst husband Kevin took an ambassadorial role.

Clark's cross was deflected into the net to give Vale a 1–0 home lead over Salford City, though they went on to draw the game 1–1 after the 2015 summer transfer window target Tom Elliott netted a 75th-minute equaliser. The following week saw a drab game at Northampton Town. Still, a Worrall goal won all three points for the Vale and lifted them out of tenth position for the first time in over two months. They made it back-to-back wins with an eventful 3–2 victory at Forest Green Rovers; Vale led by three goals with 12 minutes to go, but a straight red for Clark was followed by two goals for Rovers and a second yellow card for Pope. In the face of multiple suspensions and the difficult conditions posed by Storm Dennis, Vale cruised to a 3–0 home victory over Colchester United to take their place in the play-offs, with Conlon scoring his first of the season and Cullen bagging a brace. The following week Vale brought a large away following to Walsall but had to settle for a point after twice losing the lead in a 2–2 draw. They picked up an identical result at home to Scunthorpe United the following week, surrendering a 2–1 lead to a 90th-minute George Miller equaliser.

Vale faced a difficult trip to play-off rivals Cheltenham on 7 March, but managed to end their hosts five match winning run with a goalless draw and had two penalty shouts turned down, including one that referee Scott Duncan initially gave only to change his mind after consulting his linesman. Bennett left the club the following week, after being sold to National League side Stockport County for an undisclosed fee. On 13 March, all EFL fixtures were suspended until at least 3 April due to the COVID-19 pandemic in the United Kingdom. Six days later, the suspension was extended until 30 April, before eventually that date too was scrubbed to an unspecified time when "it is safe to resume". To help the local area during the crisis, Carol Shanahan turned the club into a community hub, delivering food and care packages to the north of the city and working closely with the city council, schools and charities. The next month it was confirmed that the club would place the entire club staff on furlough, including players and coaches from the first-team and youth team.

On 15 May, League Two clubs voted to end the season after 37 games, causing Vale to finish one place outside the play-offs; CEO Colin Garlick said that the club had voted for the proposal despite meaning they narrowly missed out on the play-offs as it would help to secure the financial future of all the clubs in the division. A BBC Sport study with Professor James Reade and Dr Carl Singleton from the Economics Department at the University of Reading predicted that Vale would have finished seventh if the season had played out. Askey confirmed that eight players would be offered new contracts – Luke Joyce, David Amoo, Rhys Browne, Shaun Brisley, Cristian Montaño, Tom Conlon, Mark Cullen and Nathan Smith – whilst six players would be released: Will Atkinson, Kieran Kennedy, Callum Evans, Ryan Lloyd, Jonny Maddison and Jordan McFarlane-Archer.

"Manager John Askey sets up Port Vale very well in all areas of play. In attack, they look to make use of the entire pitch. They form triangles out wide and open up the midfield so that progressive passes can reach the lone striker. Their frontline also possesses players who can drift away from opposing defenders and others who can act as a target man and direct outlet for the team. Defensively, all of the Vale team contribute to the press and shape. The three most noteworthy players here however, are goalkeeper Scott Brown and the two centre-backs ahead of him. This defensive trio contain names that rank amongst the league’s best, and are capable of dealing with direct or possession-based opponents.... Port Vale from front to back have a solid structure and great individual quality. They’ve caught the eye in 2019–20 with a play-off push. Perhaps in 2020–21, John Askey’s boys in black and white can do even better."

— An analysis of the club's tactics by analyst Edward Walker.

=== Cup competitions ===
Vale faced a difficult tie at Milton Keynes Dons (League One) in the FA Cup first round but secured their place into the next round with Worrall scoring the game's only goal inside 20 minutes. They were then drawn away to League Two rivals Cheltenham Town and progressed into the third round thanks to a second half Tom Pope hat-trick after having trailed 1–0 at half-time. The club were rewarded in the third round draw with a trip to the Premier League champions, Manchester City. Pep Guardiola praised Vale's away support after the club sold out their 8,000 ticket allocation. City took the lead through Oleksandr Zinchenko on 20 minutes, before Pope levelled the scoreline with a 35th-minute header; City though went on to secure a 4–1 victory thanks to goals from Sergio Agüero, Taylor Harwood-Bellis and Phil Foden.

Vale were drawn at home to Burton Albion (League One) in the first round of the EFL Cup, and though Cullen scored his first goal for the club with a 53rd-minute penalty, Burton went on to win the game 2–1.

Vale were drawn against Shrewsbury Town (League One), Macclesfield Town (League Two) and the Newcastle United Academy in the group stages of the EFL Trophy; Askey had previously managed both Shrewsbury and Macclesfield. Vale showed their strength in depth by coming from behind to beat Shrewsbury 2–1; Kennedy, Evans and McFarlane-Archer made their debuts, and it was McFarlane-Archer who claimed the winning goal on 75 minutes. They then effectively booked their place into the next round with a 3–2 victory at Macclesfield, Burgess (on his debut) and Taylor scored their first goals for the club, whilst Hurst also made his professional debut in the game; despite 283 travelling supporters making the short trip, the attendance of 757 was the fourth lowest for a competitive Port Vale fixture in recorded history. Askey made eleven changes for the visit of Newcastle United's youngsters as Vale had already qualified for the next round; Cullen scored both goals of a 2–1 victory. They were then drawn at home to League Two rivals Mansfield Town and advanced after winning 4–2 on penalties; as with the league game between the two sides earlier in the season Vale came from behind in the match to draw 2–2, though this time it was the Vale who lost a 2–1 lead in stoppage-time. In the third round they faced a trip to League Two Salford City, where they had drawn 1–1 in the league back in August; however, a poor performance saw them eliminated 3–0.

== Results ==
Win	Draw	Loss

=== Pre-season ===
6 July 2019 Friendly	Kidsgrove Athletic	1–2	Port Vale F.C.	Kidsgrove
15:00 BST	Williamson 83'	Report	Cullen 20'; Bennett 65'	Stadium: Hollinwood Road; Attendance: 1,689

13 July 2019 Friendly	Leek Town	1–2	Port Vale	Leek
15:00 BST	Bott 86'	Report	Pope 19'; Amoo 77'	Stadium: Harrison Park; Attendance: 1,100

17 July 2019 Friendly	Port Vale	1–0	Fleetwood Town	Burslem
19:30 BST	Amoo 58'	Report		Stadium: Vale Park; Attendance: 780; Referee: Mike Dean

20 July 2019 Friendly	Port Vale	1–3	Burnley	Burslem
15:00 BST	Pope 10'	Report	Brady 53', 84'; Vydra 81'	Stadium: Vale Park; Attendance: 1,272; Referee: Oli Yates

27 July 2019 Friendly	Port Vale	1–2	Bury	Burslem
15:00 BST	Cullen 63'	Report	Bunn 23'; Archer 38'	Stadium: Vale Park

=== EFL League Two ===
==== League table ====
Pos	Team	Pld	W	D	L	GF	GA	GD	Pts	PPG	Promotion, qualification or relegation
4	Cheltenham Town	36	17	13	6	52	27	+25	64	1.78	Qualification for League Two play-offs (Note: Four teams play for one spot and promotion to EFL League One.)
5	Exeter City	37	18	11	8	53	43	+10	65	1.76	Qualification for League Two play-offs
6	Colchester United	37	15	13	9	52	37	+15	58	1.57	Qualification for League Two play-offs
7	Northampton Town (O, P)	37	17	7	13	54	40	+14	58	1.57	Qualification for League Two play-offs
8	Port Vale	37	14	15	8	50	44	+6	57	1.54	
9	Bradford City	37	14	12	11	44	40	+4	54	1.46	
10	Forest Green Rovers	36	13	10	13	43	40	+3	49	1.36	
11	Salford City	37	13	11	13	49	46	+3	50	1.35	
12	Walsall	36	13	8	15	40	49	−9	47	1.31	

Source: EFL Official Website
Rules for classification: 1) Points per game; 2) Goal difference; 3) Number of goals scored; 4) Head-to-head results; 5) Wins; 6) Away goals; 7) Penalty points (sec 9.5); 8) 12-point sending off offences
(O) Play-off winners; (P) Promoted

==== Results by matchday ====
Round	1	2	3	4	5	6	7	8	9	10	11	12	13	14	15	16	17	18	19	20	21	22	23	24	25	26	27	28	29	30	31	32	33	34	35	36	37	38	39	40	41	42	43	44	45	46
Ground	A	H	A	H	A	H	A	H	A	H	A	H	A	H	A	H	A	H	A	H	A	H	A	H	H	A	A	H	A	H	H	A	A	H	A	H	A	H	H	A	H	A	H	A	H	A
Result	D	D	D	W	L	W	L	W	L	D	D	W	L	D	W	D	W	W	L	L	D	D	D	W	D	W	L	W	L	W	D	W	W	W	D	D	D	P	P	P	P	P	P	P	P	P
Position	13	16	17	11	16	10	14	10	15	13	15	10	13	16	10	11	10	8	9	10	10	10	10	10	10	10	10	10	10	10	10	9	8	6	8	7	8	8	8	8	8	8	8	8	8	8
Points	1	2	3	6	6	9	9	12	12	13	14	17	17	18	21	22	25	28	28	28	29	30	31	34	35	38	38	41	41	44	45	48	51	54	55	56	57	57	57	57	57	57	57	57	57	57

Source: Statto
A = Away; H = Home; W = Win; D = Draw; L = Loss

==== Matches ====
3 August 2019 1	Colchester United	1–1	Port Vale	Colchester
15:00 BST	Norris 45'	Report	Pope 5' (pen.)	Stadium: Colchester Community Stadium; Attendance: 3,729; Referee: Darren Drysdale; Assistant referees: Stephen Brown, Kevin Howick; Fourth official: Ryan Whitaker

10 August 2019 2	Port Vale	1–1	Northampton Town	Burslem
15:00 BST	Amoo 26'	Report	Watson 42+5'	Stadium: Vale Park; Attendance: 5,931; Referee: David Rock; Assistant referees: Christopher Ward, Robert Atkin; Fourth official: Wade Smith

17 August 2019 3	Salford City	1–1	Port Vale	Salford
15:00 BST	Beesley 90+3'	Report	Bennett 81'	Stadium: Moor Lane; Attendance: 3,770; Referee: Anthony Backhouse; Assistant referees: Wayne Grunnill, Chris Isherwood; Fourth official: Danny Gratton

20 August 2019 4	Port Vale	2–1	Forest Green Rovers	Burslem
19:45 BST	Bennett 4'; Amoo 34'	Report	Mills 6'	Stadium: Vale Park; Attendance: 4,010; Referee: Ross Joyce; Assistant referees: Joe Clark, Christopher Husband; Fourth official: Martin Woods

24 August 2019 5	Grimsby Town	5–2	Port Vale F.C.	Cleethorpes
15:00 BST	Cook 20'; Ogbu 51'; Green 57'; Waterfall 80'; Hanson 86'	Report	Whitehouse 13' (og.); Smith 62'	Stadium: Blundell Park; Attendance: 4,290; Referee: Will Finnie; Assistant referees: Geoffrey Liddle, Paul Newhouse; Fourth official: Joe Simpson

31 August 2019 6	Port Vale	1–0	Cambridge United	Burslem
15:00 BST	Bennett 84'	Report		Stadium: Vale Park; Attendance: 4,874; Referee: James Oldham; Assistant referees: Kevin Mulraine, Paul Graham; Fourth official: Ollie Williams

7 September 2019 7	Newport County	1–0	Port Vale	Newport, Wales
15:00 BST	Matt 77'	Report		Stadium: Rodney Parade; Attendance: 3,913; Referee: Christopher Pollard; Assistant referees: Marvyn Amphlett, Craig Taylor; Fourth official: Simon Shaw

14 September 2019 8	Port Vale	1–0	Plymouth Argyle	Burslem
15:00 BST	Smith 76'	Report		Stadium: Vale Park; Attendance: 5,275; Referee: Marc Edwards; Assistant referees: Anthony Moore, Graeme Fyvie; Fourth official: Conor Brown

17 September 2019 9	Exeter City	2–0	Port Vale	Exeter
19:45 BST	Bowman 81'; Kennedy 89' (og.)	Report		Stadium: St James Park; Attendance: 3,765; Referee: Alan Young; Assistant referees: Mark Pottage, Darren Wilding; Fourth official: Mark Russell

21 September 2019 10	Port Vale	2–2	Mansfield Town	Burslem
19:45 BST	Cullen 45+4'; Smith 90+4'	Report	Gordon 14'; Rose 75' (pen.)	Stadium: Vale Park; Attendance: 5,109; Referee: Josh Smith; Assistant referees: Gary Hilton, Wade Smith; Fourth official: Dumitru-Ravel Cheosiaua

28 September 2019 11	Leyton Orient	3–3	Port Vale	Leyton, London
15:00 BST	Wright 4', 90+3'; Wilkinson 59'	Report	Burgess 23'; Legge 28'; Taylor 85'	Stadium: Brisbane Road; Attendance: 5,490; Referee: Scott Oldham; Assistant referees: Carl Fitch, Mike Desborough; Fourth official: Matthew Lee

5 October 2019 12	Port Vale	3–1	Morecambe	Burslem
15:00 BST	Joyce 49'; Pope 68', 90'	Report	O'Sullivan 18'	Stadium: Vale Park; Attendance: 4,485; Referee: Charles Breakspear; Assistant referees: Alan Clayton, Richard Morris; Fourth official: Mark Jones

12 October 2019 13	Macclesfield Town	2–1	Port Vale	Macclesfield
15:00 BST	Gnahoua 39'; Osadebe 64'	Report	Bennett 12'	Stadium: Moss Rose; Attendance: 3,647; Referee: Darren Handley; Assistant referees: David Benton, Andrew Dallison; Fourth official: Danny Gratton

19 October 2019 14	Port Vale	1–1	Stevenage	Burslem
15:00 BST	Taylor 8'	Report	Guthrie 23' (pen.)	Stadium: Vale Park; Attendance: 4,429; Referee: Peter Wright; Assistant referees: Abbas Khan, Conor Brown; Fourth official: David Plowright

22 October 2019 15	Bradford City	1–2	Port Vale	Bradford
19:45 BST	Vaughan 45+1' (pen.)	Report	Worrall 18'; Atkinson 90+3'	Stadium: Valley Parade; Attendance: 14,345; Referee: Graham Salisbury; Assistant referees: Paul Newhouse, William Smallwood; Fourth official: Barry Gordon

26 October 2019 16	Port Vale	0–0	Oldham Athletic	Burslem
15:00 BST		Report		Stadium: Vale Park; Attendance: 4,301; Referee: Robert Lewis; Assistant referees: Robert Atkin, Ollie Williams, Ian Smedley; Fourth official: Kevin Morris

2 November 2019 17	Crewe Alexandra	0–1	Port Vale	Crewe
15:00 GMT		Report	Taylor 61'	Stadium: Gresty Road; Attendance: 7,705; Referee: Ross Joyce; Assistant referees: Matthew Perry, Joe Clark; Fourth official: Lewis Smith

16 November 2019 18	Port Vale	2–1	Carlisle United	Burslem
15:00 GMT	Worrall 60'; Cullen 83'	Report	Loft 1'	Stadium: Vale Park; Attendance: 4,783; Referee: Martin Coy; Assistant referees: Marvyn Amphlett, Thomas Harty; Fourth official: Richard Bartlett

23 November 2019 19	Scunthorpe United	2–1	Port Vale	Scunthorpe
15:00 GMT	van Veen 37'; Ntlhe 51'	Report	Taylor 30'	Stadium: Glanford Park; Attendance: 3,391; Referee: James Oldham; Assistant referees: Ian Smedley, Conor Brown; Fourth official: David Benton

7 December 2019 20	Port Vale	0–1	Walsall	Burslem
15:00 GMT		Report	Adebayo 46'	Stadium: Vale Park; Attendance: 5,079; Referee: Andy Haines; Assistant referees: Mark Cunliffe, Michael Webb; Fourth official: Peter Gibbons

14 December 2019 21	Crawley Town	0–0	Port Vale	Crawley
15:00 GMT		Report		Stadium: Broadfield Stadium; Attendance: 1,944; Referee: Will Finnie; Assistant referees: Carl Fitch, Alasdair Ross; Fourth official: Stephen Brown

21 December 2019 22	Port Vale	1–1	Cheltenham Town	Burslem
15:00 GMT	Tozer 39' (og.)	Report	Addai 24'	Stadium: Vale Park; Attendance: 4,404; Referee: Leigh Doughty; Assistant referees: Kevin Morris, Oliver Bickle; Fourth official: Natalie Aspinall

26 December 2019 23	Mansfield Town	2–2	Port Vale	Mansfield
15:00 GMT	Maynard 81'; Hamilton 90+3'	Report	Smith 53'; Legge 66'	Stadium: Field Mill; Attendance: 5,565; Referee: Martin Coy; Assistant referees: Richard Woodward, Joe Simpson; Fourth official: Alan Clayton

29 December 2019 24	Port Vale	2–0	Swindon Town	Burslem
15:00 GMT	Burgess 13'; Taylor 52'	Report		Stadium: Vale Park; Attendance: 5,495; Referee: Scott Oldham; Assistant referees: Chris Isherwood, Ian Smedley; Fourth official: David Plowright

1 January 2020 25	Port Vale	2–2	Macclesfield Town	Burslem
15:00 GMT	Worrall 18'; Amoo 62'	Report	Harris 56'; Ironside 57'	Stadium: Vale Park; Attendance: 5,350; Referee: Ben Toner; Assistant referees: Paul Graham, Andrew Dallison; Fourth official: James Wilson

11 January 2020 26	Stevenage	0–1	Port Vale	Stevenage
15:00 GMT		Report	Pope 88' (pen.)	Stadium: Broadhall Way; Attendance: 2,646; Referee: Lee Swabey; Assistant referees: Oliver Jackson, Paul Kelly; Fourth official: George Byrne

14 January 2020 27	Morecambe	2–1	Port Vale	Morecambe
15:00 GMT	Old 6'; Stockton 12'	Report	Gibbons 71'	Stadium: Globe Arena; Attendance: 1,639; Referee: Marc Edwards; Assistant referees: David Avent, Anthony Moore; Fourth official: Matthew Perry

18 January 2020 28	Port Vale	1–0	Leyton Orient	Burslem
15:00 GMT	Amoo 71'	Report		Stadium: Vale Park; Attendance: 5,047; Referee: Michael Salisbury; Assistant referees: Joe Simpson, Matthew Bristow, Gareth Mellor; Fourth official: Daniel Middleton

25 January 2020 29	Swindon Town	3–0	Port Vale F.C.	Swindon
15:00 GMT	Legge 41' (og.); Hope 45'; Doughty 60'	Report		Stadium: County Ground; Attendance: 7,343; Referee: Craig Hicks; Assistant referees: Dumitru-Ravel Cheosiaua, Daniel Cook; Fourth official: Matthew Lee

28 January 2020 30	Port Vale	3–1	Exeter City	Burslem
19:45 GMT	Bennett 50' (pen.), 70'; Legge 64'	Report	Ajose 22'	Stadium: Vale Park; Attendance: 3,347; Referee: Paul Marsden; Assistant referees: Hristo Karaivanov, Marc Wilson; Fourth official: Conor Brown

1 February 2020 31	Port Vale	1–1	Salford City	Burslem
15:00 GMT	Burgess 55' (og.)	Report	Elliott 75'	Stadium: Vale Park; Attendance: 5,281; Referee: Neil Hair; Assistant referees: Christopher Ward, Andrew Dallison; Fourth official: Oliver Bickle

8 February 2020 32	Northampton Town	0–1	Port Vale	Northampton
15:00 GMT		Report	Worrall 72'	Stadium: Sixfields Stadium; Attendance: 5,583; Referee: Charles Breakspear; Assistant referees: Samuel Ogles, Oliver Mackey; Fourth official: Anthony Da Costa

11 February 2020 33	Forest Green Rovers	2–3	Port Vale	Nailsworth
19:45 GMT	Winchester 78' (pen.), 90+5'	Report	Brisley 14'; Pope 38', 70' (pen.)	Stadium: The New Lawn; Attendance: 1,682; Referee: Trevor Kettle; Assistant referees: Mike Desborough, Andrew Laver; Fourth official: Christopher Husband

15 February 2020 34	Port Vale	3–0	Colchester United	Burslem
15:00 GMT	Conlon 14'; Cullen 54', 72'	Report		Stadium: Vale Park; Attendance: 5,199; Referee: Leigh Doughty; Assistant referees: Robert Atkin, Ollie Williams; Fourth official: Matthew Smith

22 February 2020 35	Walsall	2–2	Port Vale	Walsall
15:00 GMT	Adebayo 15'; Gordon 58'	Report	Legge 12'; Burgess 36'	Stadium: Bescot Stadium; Attendance: 6,301; Referee: Anthony Backhouse; Assistant referees: Graeme Fyvie, William Smallwood; Fourth official: James Bell

29 February 2020 36	Port Vale	2–2	Scunthorpe United	Burslem
15:00 GMT	Cullen 16'; Smith 78'	Report	Gilliead 71'; Miller 90'	Stadium: Vale Park; Attendance: 5,121; Referee: Antony Coggins; Assistant referees: Paul Graham, Dumitru-Ravel Cheosiaua; Fourth official: Richard Bartlett

7 March 2020 37	Cheltenham Town	0–0	Port Vale	Cheltenham
15:00 GMT		Report		Stadium: Whaddon Road; Attendance: 3,741; Referee: Scott Duncan; Assistant referees: Adam Crysell, Lee Venamore; Fourth official: Scott Jackson

14 March 2020 38	Port Vale	v	Crawley Town	Burslem
15:00 GMT				Stadium: Vale Park
Note: Season was ended early due to the COVID-19 pandemic in England.

17 March 2020 39	Port Vale	v	Bradford City	Burslem
19:45 GMT				Stadium: Vale Park
Note: Season was ended early due to the COVID-19 pandemic in England.

21 March 2020 40	Oldham Athletic	v	Port Vale	Oldham
15:00 GMT				Stadium: Boundary Park
Note: Season was ended early due to the COVID-19 pandemic in England.

28 March 2020 41	Port Vale	v	Crewe Alexandra	Burslem
15:00 GMT				Stadium: Vale Park
Note: Season was ended early due to the COVID-19 pandemic in England.

4 April 2020 42	Carlisle United	v	Port Vale	Carlisle
15:00 BST				Stadium: Brunton Park
Note: Season was ended early due to the COVID-19 pandemic in England.

10 April 2020 43	Port Vale	v	Grimsby Town	Burslem
15:00 BST				Stadium: Vale Park
Note: Season was ended early due to the COVID-19 pandemic in England.

13 April 2020 44	Cambridge United	v	Port Vale	Cambridge
15:00 BST				Stadium: Abbey Stadium
Note: Season was ended early due to the COVID-19 pandemic in England.

18 April 2020 45	Port Vale	v	Newport County	Burslem
15:00 BST				Stadium: Vale Park
Note: Season was ended early due to the COVID-19 pandemic in England.

25 April 2020 46	Plymouth Argyle	v	Port Vale	Plymouth
15:00 BST				Stadium: Home Park
Note: Season was ended early due to the COVID-19 pandemic in England.

=== FA Cup ===
9 November 2019 R1	Milton Keynes Dons	0–1	Port Vale	Milton Keynes
15:00 BST		Report	Worrall 20'	Stadium: Stadium MK; Attendance: 3,598; Referee: Craig Hicks; Assistant referees: Ryan Whitaker, Hristo Karaivanov; Fourth official: Lloyd Wood

30 November 2019 R2	Cheltenham Town	1–3	Port Vale	Cheltenham
15:00 GMT	Reid 3' (pen.)	Report	Pope 60', 63', 68'	Stadium: Whaddon Road; Attendance: 2,725; Referee: Ross Joyce

4 January 2020 R3	Manchester City	4–1	Port Vale	Manchester
17:31 GMT	Zinchenko 20'; Agüero 42'; Harwood-Bellis 58'; Foden 76'	Report	Pope 35'	Stadium: City of Manchester Stadium; Attendance: 52,433; Referee: Lee Mason; Assistant referees: Nicholas Hopton, Adrian Waters; Fourth official: Seb Stockbridge

=== EFL Cup ===
13 August 2019 R1	Port Vale	1–2	Burton Albion	Burslem
19:45 BST	Cullen 53' (pen.)	Report	Boyce 9'; Fraser 62'	Stadium: Vale Park; Attendance: 2,252; Referee: Paul Marsden; Assistant referees: Lisa Rashid, Ian Smedley; Fourth official: Rob Ellis

=== EFL Trophy ===
Pos	Div	Team	Pld	W	PW	PL	L	GF	GA	GD	Pts	Qualification
1	L2	Port Vale	3	3	0	0	0	7	4	+3	9	Advance to Round 2
2	L1	Shrewsbury Town	3	2	0	0	1	7	3	+4	6	Advance to Round 2
3	L2	Macclesfield Town	3	1	0	0	2	5	7	−2	3	
4	ACA	Newcastle United U21	3	0	0	0	3	2	7	−5	0	

Source: EFL.com

3 September 2019 Group stage	Port Vale	2–1	Shrewsbury Town	Burslem
19:45 BST	Amoo 63' (pen.); Archer 75'	Report	Kennedy 27' (og.)	Stadium: Vale Park; Attendance: 1,008; Referee: Leigh Doughty; Assistant referees: Hristo Karaivanov, Natalie Aspinall; Fourth official: Alan Clayton

24 September 2019 Group stage	Macclesfield Town	2–3	Port Vale	Macclesfield
19:45 BST	Ironside 16'; Archibald 90+2'	Report	Burgess 34'; Bennett 52'; Taylor 74'	Stadium: Moss Rose; Attendance: 757; Referee: Carl Boyeson; Assistant referees: Richard Bartlett, Thomas Harty; Fourth official: Mark Cunliffe

12 November 2019 Group stage	Port Vale	2–1	Newcastle United U21	Burslem
19:45 BST	Cullen 40', 85'	Report	Anderson 50'	Stadium: Vale Park; Attendance: 571; Referee: Paul Marsden; Assistant referees: Matthew Smith, Matthew Jones; Fourth official: Mark Cunliffe

3 December 2019 R2	Port Vale	2–2 (4–2 p)	Mansfield Town	Burslem
19:45 GMT	Browne 64'; Taylor 82'	Report	Hamilton 50'; Sterling-James 90+2'	Stadium: Vale Park; Attendance: 1,164; Referee: Marc Edwards; Assistant referees: Anthony Moore, William Smallwood; Fourth official: Steven Copeland
	Penalties
	Joyce (penalty scored); Taylor (penalty scored); Burgess (penalty scored); Atkinson (penalty scored)		Hamilton (penalty missed); Mellis (penalty scored); Benning (penalty missed); Knowles (penalty scored)

7 January 2020 R3	Salford City	3–0	Port Vale	Salford
19:45 GMT	Burgess 35'; Armstrong 79'; Jervis 84'	Report		Stadium: Moor Lane; Attendance: 630; Referee: Christopher Sarginson; Assistant referees: Richard Wigglesworth, Ian Smedley; Fourth official: Conor Brown

== Squad statistics ==
=== Appearances and goals ===
Key to positions: GK – Goalkeeper; DF – Defender; MF – Midfielder; FW – Forward

No.	Pos	Nat	Player	Total		EFL League Two		FA Cup		EFL Cup		EFL Trophy	
No.	Pos	Nat	Player	Apps	Goals	Apps	Goals	Apps	Goals	Apps	Goals	Apps	Goals
1	GK	(England) ENG	Scott Brown	45	0	37	0	3	0	1	0	4	0
2	DF	(England) ENG	James Gibbons	39	1	32	1	3	0	1	0	3	0
3	DF	(England) ENG	Adam Crookes	17	0	14	0	0	0	1	0	2	0
4	MF	(England) ENG	Luke Joyce	43	1	36	1	3	0	1	0	3	0
5	DF	(England) ENG	Leon Legge	42	4	37	4	3	0	1	0	1	0
6	DF	(England) ENG	Kieran Kennedy	4	0	1	0	0	0	0	0	3	0
7	MF	(England) ENG	David Worrall	39	5	34	4	2	1	1	0	2	0
8	MF	(England) ENG	Manny Oyeleke	7	0	6	0	0	0	0	0	1	0
9	FW	(England) ENG	Tom Pope	37	10	32	6	3	4	1	0	1	0
10	MF	(England) ENG	Tom Conlon	27	1	22	1	2	0	1	0	2	0
11	MF	(Colombia) COL	Cristian Montaño	36	0	30	0	3	0	1	0	2	0
12	MF	(England) ENG	Will Atkinson	15	1	11	1	1	0	0	0	3	0
13	FW	(England) ENG	Mark Cullen	25	8	18	5	1	0	1	1	5	2
14	MF	(England) ENG	Danny Pugh	0	0	0	0	0	0	0	0	0	0
15	DF	(England) ENG	Nathan Smith	41	5	34	5	3	0	1	0	3	0
16	MF	(England) ENG	Jake Taylor	25	7	18	5	3	0	0	0	4	2
17	MF	(Antigua and Barbuda) ANT	Rhys Browne	15	1	11	0	1	0	0	0	3	1
18	DF	(England) ENG	Callum Evans	9	0	5	0	1	0	0	0	3	0
19	MF	(England) ENG	David Amoo	37	5	32	4	3	0	1	0	1	1
20	MF	(England) ENG	Scott Burgess	29	4	24	3	2	0	0	0	3	1
22	MF	(England) ENG	Ryan Lloyd	12	0	6	0	0	0	1	0	5	0
23	DF	(England) ENG	Ryan Campbell-Gordon	2	0	1	0	0	0	0	0	1	0
24	DF	(Wales) WAL	Mitch Clark	4	0	4	0	0	0	0	0	0	0
25	MF	(England) ENG	Daniel Trickett-Smith	1	0	0	0	0	0	0	0	1	0
27	MF	(England) ENG	Alex Hurst	1	0	0	0	0	0	0	0	1	0
28	DF	(England) ENG	Shaun Brisley	14	1	9	1	1	0	0	0	4	0
29	FW	(England) ENG	Jordan McFarlane-Archer	8	1	3	0	0	0	0	0	5	1
30	GK	(England) ENG	Jonny Maddison	1	0	0	0	0	0	0	0	1	0
Players who featured but departed the club during the season:
12	DF	(Wales) WAL	Connell Rawlinson	0	0	0	0	0	0	0	0	0	0
14	MF	(England) ENG	Ben Whitfield	0	0	0	0	0	0	0	0	0	0
21	FW	(England) ENG	Richie Bennett	30	7	26	6	1	0	1	0	2	1
24	MF	(England) ENG	Joe Berks	0	0	0	0	0	0	0	0	0	0
26	MF	(England) ENG	Lucas Green-Birch	0	0	0	0	0	0	0	0	0	0

=== Top scorers ===
Place	Position	Nation	Number	Name	EFL League Two	FA Cup	EFL Cup	EFL Trophy	Total
1	FW	England	9	Tom Pope	6	4	0	0	10
2	FW	England	13	Mark Cullen	5	0	1	2	8
3	FW	England	21	Richie Bennett	6	0	0	1	7
–	MF	England	16	Jake Taylor	5	0	0	2	7
5	MF	England	19	David Amoo	4	0	0	1	5
–	MF	England	15	Nathan Smith	5	0	0	0	5
–	MF	England	7	David Worrall	4	1	0	0	5
8	MF	England	20	Scott Burgess	3	0	0	1	4
–	DF	England	5	Leon Legge	4	0	0	0	4
10	FW	England	29	Jordan McFarlane-Archer	0	0	0	1	1
–	MF	England	12	Will Atkinson	1	0	0	0	1
–	DF	England	28	Shaun Brisley	1	0	0	0	1
–	MF	Antigua and Barbuda	17	Rhys Browne	0	0	0	1	1
–	MF	England	10	Tom Conlon	1	0	0	0	1
–	DF	England	2	James Gibbons	1	0	0	0	1
–	MF	England	4	Luke Joyce	1	0	0	0	1
–	–	–	–	Own goals	3	0	0	0	3
				TOTALS	50	5	1	9	65

=== Disciplinary record ===
Number	Nation	Position	Name	EFL League Two		FA Cup		EFL Cup		EFL Trophy		Total	
Number	Nation	Position	Name	Yellow card	Red card	Yellow card	Red card	Yellow card	Red card	Yellow card	Red card	Yellow card	Red card
7	England	MF	David Worrall	5	1	0	0	0	0	0	0	5	1
9	England	FW	Tom Pope	4	1	0	0	0	0	0	0	4	1
24	Wales	DF	Mitch Clark	1	1	0	0	0	0	0	0	1	1
10	England	MF	Tom Conlon	1	1	0	0	0	0	0	0	1	1
2	England	DF	James Gibbons	10	0	0	0	1	0	0	0	11	0
4	England	MF	Luke Joyce	9	0	1	0	0	0	0	0	10	0
5	England	DF	Leon Legge	9	0	0	0	0	0	0	0	9	0
11	Colombia	MF	Cristian Montaño	8	0	0	0	0	0	0	0	8	0
28	England	DF	Shaun Brisley	3	0	0	0	0	0	0	0	3	0
3	England	DF	Adam Crookes	3	0	0	0	0	0	0	0	3	0
16	England	MF	Jake Taylor	3	0	0	0	0	0	0	0	3	0
19	England	MF	David Amoo	1	0	0	0	1	0	0	0	2	0
21	England	FW	Richie Bennett	1	0	0	0	1	0	0	0	2	0
12	England	MF	Will Atkinson	1	0	0	0	0	0	0	0	1	0
1	England	GK	Scott Brown	1	0	0	0	0	0	0	0	1	0
20	England	MF	Scott Burgess	1	0	0	0	0	0	0	0	1	0
6	England	DF	Kieran Kennedy	0	0	0	0	0	0	1	0	1	0
15	England	DF	Nathan Smith	1	0	0	0	0	0	0	0	1	0
			TOTALS	64	4	1	0	3	0	1	0	69	4

Sourced from Soccerway.

== Awards ==
End of Season Awards	Winner
Player of the Year	David Worrall
Players' Player of the Year	Luke Joyce & David Worrall
Goal of the Season	Tom Pope (vs Manchester City, 4 January 2020)
Young Player of the Year	Scott Burgess
Youth Player of the Year	Luke Chambers
Supporter's Club Award	David Worrall
Official Away Travel Player of the Year	David Worrall

== Transfers ==
=== Transfers in ===
Date from	Position	Nationality	Name	From	Fee	Ref.
1 July 2019 (Note: The transfer was announced on 21 June and would become official on 1 July once his contract at Carlisle United expired)	CF	ENG	Richie Bennett	Carlisle United	Free transfer	
1 July 2019 (Note: The transfer was announced on 24 May and would become official on 1 July once his contract at Bury expired)	CM	ENG	Scott Burgess	Bury	Free transfer	
1 July 2019 (Note: The transfer was announced on 31 May and would become official on 1 July once his contract at Nottingham Forest expired)	CB	ENG	Adam Crookes	Nottingham Forest	Free transfer	
1 July 2019 (Note: The transfer was announced on 26 June and would become official on 1 July once his contract at Blackpool expired)	CF	ENG	Mark Cullen	Blackpool	Free transfer	
1 July 2019 (Note: The transfer was announced on 3 June and would become official on 1 July once his contract at Wrexham expired)	CB	ENG	Kieran Kennedy	Wrexham	Free transfer	
1 July 2019 (Note: The transfer was announced on 26 June and would become official on 1 July once his contract at Macclesfield Town expired)	AM	ENG	Ryan Lloyd	Macclesfield Town	Free transfer	
8 July 2019	RW	ENG	David Amoo	Cambridge United	Free transfer	
20 July 2019	DM	ENG	Callum Evans	Macclesfield Town	Free transfer	
27 July 2019	RW	ATG	Rhys Browne	Yeovil Town	Free transfer	
31 July 2019	GK	ENG	Jonny Maddison	Darlington	Free transfer	
3 August 2019	MF	ENG	Alex Hurst	Bradford Park Avenue	Free transfer	
30 August 2019	CB	ENG	Shaun Brisley	Notts County	Free transfer	
31 August 2019	CF	ENG	Jordan McFarlane-Archer	Bury	Free transfer	
4 October 2019	CM	ENG	Will Atkinson	Mansfield Town	Free transfer	

=== Transfers out ===
Date from	Position	Nationality	Name	To	Fee	Ref.
5 July 2019	MF	ENG	Luke Daley	Huddersfield Town	Undisclosed	
5 August 2019	CB	WAL	Connell Rawlinson	Notts County	Free transfer	
3 September 2019	CM	ENG	Ben Whitfield	Torquay United	Mutual consent	
14 January 2020	MF	ENG	Joe Berks	Stafford Rangers	Released	
14 January 2020	MF	ENG	Lucas Green-Birch	Market Drayton Town	Released	
12 March 2020	CF	ENG	Richie Bennett	Stockport County	Undisclosed	
19 May 2020	CF	ENG	Jordan McFarlane-Archer	Boston United	Released	
19 May 2020	CM	ENG	Will Atkinson	Alfreton Town	Released	
19 May 2020	DM	ENG	Callum Evans	Bath City	Released	
19 May 2020	CB	ENG	Kieran Kennedy	York City	Released	
19 May 2020	AM	ENG	Ryan Lloyd	Hereford	Released	
19 May 2020	GK	ENG	Jonny Maddison		Released	

=== Loans in ===
Date from	Position	Nationality	Name	From	Date until	Ref.
30 August 2019	MF	ENG	Jake Taylor	Nottingham Forest	End of season	
30 January 2020	RB	WAL	Mitch Clark	Leicester City	End of season	

=== Loans out ===
Date from	Position	Nationality	Name	To	Date until	Ref.
3 August 2019	MF	ENG	Alex Hurst	Bradford Park Avenue	23 April 2020	
5 August 2019	MF	ENG	Joe Berks	Stafford Rangers	25 December 2019	
13 September 2019	LB	ENG	Ryan Campbell-Gordon	Ilkeston Town	13 October 2019	
13 September 2019	AM	ENG	Daniel Trickett-Smith	Curzon Ashton	14 November 2019	
21 September 2019	CM	ENG	Lucas Green-Birch	Market Drayton Town	21 October 2019	
20 November 2019	CB	ENG	Kieran Kennedy	Wrexham	23 April 2020	
18 December 2019	MF	ENG	Hayden Campbell	Kidsgrove Athletic	January 2020	
18 December 2019	FW	ENG	Maxwell Chimenes	Newcastle Town	January 2020	
16 January 2020	CF	ENG	Jordan McFarlane-Archer	Stockport County	15 February 2020	
21 February 2020	AM	ENG	Daniel Trickett-Smith	FC United of Manchester	17 March 2020	
29 February 2020	LB	ENG	Ryan Campbell-Gordon	Kidsgrove Athletic	17 March 2020	
