= Carol Shanahan =

English businesswoman

Carol Shanahan OBE
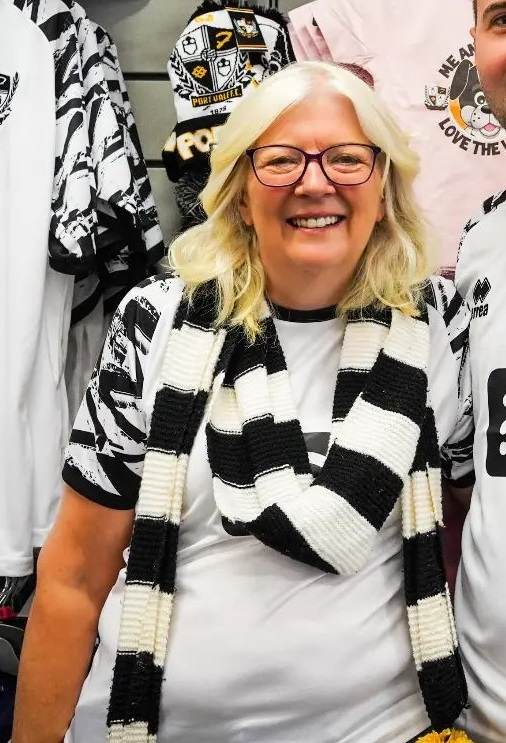
- Shanahan in Port Vale colours in 2022
- Born: 27 December 1957 (age 68); Skegness, England
- Occupation: Businesswoman

Chairperson of Port Vale
- In office 2019–present
- Preceded by: Norman Smurthwaite

Chancellor of Keele University
- In office 2026–present
- Preceded by: James Timpson

Personal details
- Spouse: Kevin Shanahan
- Children: Kate, Rosie, Patrick, Francesca

Carol Ann Shanahan OBE (born 27 December 1957) is an English businesswoman and club chairperson of Port Vale Football Club.

== Business career ==
Shanahan was born in December 1957 in Skegness. She moved to West Bromwich at the age of six to live with her mother, who was the secretary to the West Bromwich Albion club doctor; it was at The Hawthorns that Shanahan first became interested in football. She left school without any formal qualifications. At age 17, she became the first female main-frame computer operator at Hoskins Systems in Birmingham. She met Kevin Shanahan in 1979, a fellow IT worker. The pair would later marry and have four children – Kate, Rosie, Patrick and Francesca – before founding fintech company Synectics Solutions in February 1992. Synectics works to prevent fraud and has international clients, including governments, banks, building societies, and insurance companies.

Originally based in Newcastle-under-Lyme, the company moved to Burslem in 2015, in a large building next to Vale Park. The company received one of the Queen's Awards for Enterprise in 2019, leading her to state that "To win an award of this calibre is a fantastic achievement, contributed to by every one of our 360 employees. Of the many awards we have won over the past few years, this is the pinnacle of our work to date." This came two years after Shanahan was named as 'Director of the Year for Leadership in Corporate Social Responsibility' at the Institute of Directors awards. The Shanahans set up hospitality firm Summit Hospitality after finding they had extra rooms in Synectics' new building. She was awarded an honorary doctorate by Staffordshire University in 2017 and also became chair of the Port Vale Foundation Trust. She founded the Hubb Foundation in February 2019, a charitable organisation to help underprivileged children in Stoke-on-Trent. She sold her controlling interest in Synectics in 2024, though remained on the board of directors along with her daughter, Rosie. Shanahan was announced as new Chancellor of Keele University in May 2026, four years after receiving an honorary degree from the university.

== Chair of Port Vale ==
Having first attempted to buy Port Vale in 2015 and had a £1.25 million bid rejected in May 2017, she and Kevin finally bought out Norman Smurthwaite for more than £5 million in May 2019 following months of negotiation. Initially she and Kevin were co-chairs of the club before Kevin stepped down to leave Carol as the sole chair in January 2020. The next month she was voted as the fourth best owner in English football in a poll carried out by the 'Against League 3' pressure group.

"The way we viewed it...yes we have paid far too much but you look at it as a business deal. So, as a business person if you were going to assess it, you would say why on earth have you done that! But that isn't how we viewed it. We really viewed it as almost a loved one was held hostage and someone had to pay the ransom. The club would have gone into administration, it would have folded."

— Shanahan explained why she felt compelled to buy the Port Vale in May 2019.

Shanahan voted with the chairs of the other League Two clubs to end the 2019–20 season after 37 games due to the COVID-19 pandemic in England, causing Vale to finish one place outside the play-offs; CEO Colin Garlick said that the club had voted for the proposal despite meaning they narrowly missed out on the play-offs as it would help to secure the financial future of all the clubs in the division. Shanahan said she "came away shaking" from the vote, but made her decision for "the greater good" of the game. A BBC Sport study predicted that Vale would have finished seventh and reached the play-offs if the season had played out. To help the local area during the crisis, Shanahan turned the club into a community hub, delivering food and care packages to the north of the city and working closely with the city council, schools and charities.

Shanahan was appointed Officer of the Order of the British Empire (OBE) in the 2020 Birthday Honours for services to the community of Stoke-on-Trent during the COVID-19 epidemic. She sacked club manager John Askey in January 2021, following a two-month losing run that saw the team drop from the play-off places to 17th in the table. The following month she appointed David Flitcroft as the club's first ever director of football, working alongside new managerial appointment Darrell Clarke – the club paid Walsall a compensation fee to sign Clarke. She was given an honorary degree by Keele University in May 2021 and named as a member on the EFL Trust Board three months later. She was named as Community Heroine of the Year at The Women of the Year Luncheon & Awards in April 2022. Clarke returned from a close family bereavement to lead Vale through the League Two play-off semi-finals at the end of the 2021–22 season. Promotion was secured with a 3–0 victory over Mansfield Town in the final.

She initiated a shake-up in the club's boardroom in April 2023, whilst remaining a "hands on owner". Darrell Clarke was also sacked later that month and his assistant, Andy Crosby, was appointed as the club's new manager. Crosby was sacked on 5 February 2024. With fan opinion turning hostile towards Flitcroft, Shanahan published a lengthy open letter on the club website defending Flitcroft and his achievements as Port Vale's director of football. Darren Moore was hired as the club's new manager on a five-and-a-half-year contract, which Moore said was "a testament to the long-term vision of the club". David Flitcroft was sacked. Port Vale was relegated at the end of the 2023–24 season. At this point, Shanahan apologised to the fans and stated her intent for the club to gain promotion again. She also decided to do less public speaking after she was filmed without her knowledge while giving an after-match speech in the Valiant Suite. The club secured an immediate promotion in the 2024–25 season and Shanahan stated that they were stronger than they had been the previous time they went up. Both Shanahan and the club itself were awarded Honorary Freedom of Stoke-on-Trent in recognition of eminent services to the city. By this time, the home attendance figures at Vale Park had doubled from the time that Shanahan took over the club.
