= John Askey =

English football manager and former player (born 1964)

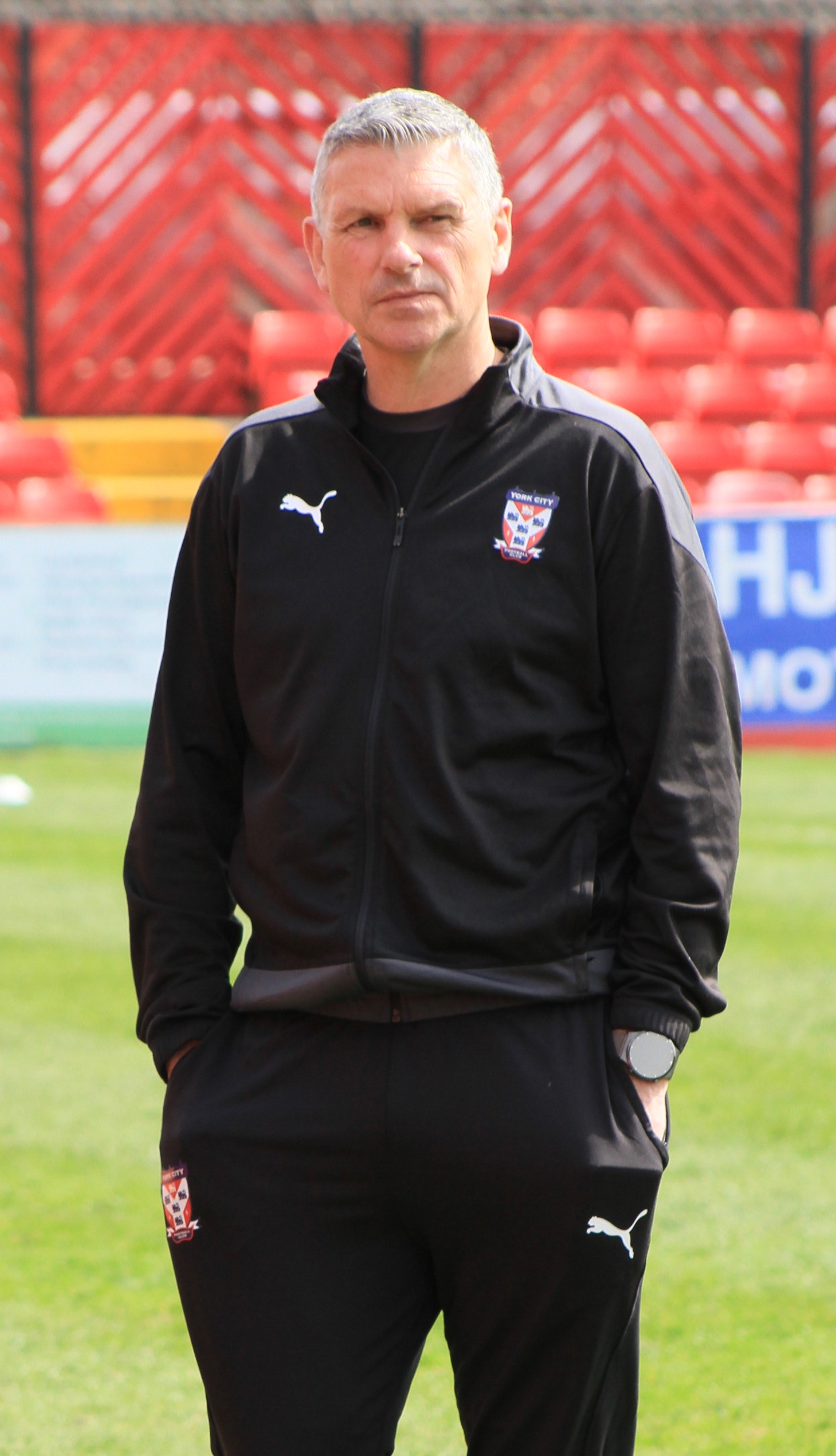
- Askey as manager of York City in 2022

Personal information
- Full name: John Colin Askey
- Date of birth: 4 November 1964 (age 62)
- Place of birth: Stoke-on-Trent, England
- Height: 6 ft 0 in (1.83 m)
- Positions: Winger; striker

Team information
- Current team: Truro City (manager)

Youth career
- 1979–1982: Port Vale

Senior career*
Years	Team	Apps	(Gls)
1982–1983	Port Vale	0	(0)
1983–1984	Milton United		
1984–2003	Macclesfield Town	511	(109)
Total		511	(109)

International career
1990	England Semi-Pro	1	(0)

Managerial career
- 2003–2004: Macclesfield Town
- 2013–2018: Macclesfield Town
- 2018: Shrewsbury Town
- 2019–2021: Port Vale
- 2021–2022: York City
- 2023: Hartlepool United
- 2024–: Truro City
- * Club domestic league appearances and goals

John Colin Askey (born 4 November 1964) is an English professional football manager and former player who is the manager of National League South club Truro City.

Able to play as a winger or as a striker, Askey had pace and intelligence. A former youth team player at Port Vale, he joined Macclesfield Town from Milton United in 1984. During his time at the club, Macclesfield spent six seasons in the Football League and won the Northern Premier League title in 1986–87, the Football Conference title in 1994–95 and 1996–97, and promotion out of the Third Division in 1997–98. Town also won the Northern Premier League Challenge Cup, Northern Premier League President's Cup, Bob Lord Challenge Trophy, Cheshire Senior Cup and Staffordshire Senior Cup. In 19 seasons at the club, he scored 155 goals in 679 league and cup appearances, becoming the club's record appearance holder and fourth-highest goalscorer; he was named as the club's PFA Fans' Favourites and was later rewarded with the freedom of Macclesfield in August 2018.

Askey stayed on at Macclesfield Town as a coach after retiring as a player and was appointed as manager in October 2003. He was replaced as manager in April 2004 but stayed on at the club as a coach before he was appointed as manager for a second time in April 2013. He coached Macclesfield to the 2017 FA Trophy final, in which they were beaten by York City. The following season, 2017–18, he led the team back into the Football League as champions of the National League despite having one of the division's lowest budgets. Following this achievement, he managed Shrewsbury Town in June 2018, before his dismissal five months later. He was appointed as Port Vale manager in February 2019 and remained in the job until January 2021. He took up the management position at York City in November 2021 and led the club to promotion out of the National League North via the play-offs at the end of the 2021–22 season. He was appointed as manager of League Two club Hartlepool United in February 2023 but was unable to keep Hartlepool in League Two. He was dismissed as Hartlepool manager in December 2023 and took charge at Truro City six months later. He led Truro into the fifth tier for the first time as 2024–25 champions of the National League South.

== Playing career ==
=== Early life and career ===
John Colin Askey was born on 4 November 1964 in Stoke-on-Trent. His father, Colin, made over 200 appearances for Port Vale in the 1950s. Askey was one of five children; Bob, Mark, Steve, and Joanne. He played youth team football for Milton Spurs, Milton schools, Hanley schools and Stoke-on-Trent schoolboys, before joining Port Vale's youth team at the age of 15. He was never handed a first-team debut at Vale Park and rejected manager John McGrath's £5-a-week offer following the conclusion of his six-month Youth Training Scheme contract. After leaving the club he spent a year working as a labourer for a pottery firm in Tunstall, before entering the insurance industry at the age of 19. He also played amateur football for Milton United – managed by his father – and Miners Arms Milton.

=== Macclesfield Town ===
Askey first joined Macclesfield Town, alongside his brother Bob, to fill a gap when the club were short of players. He scored on his debut during the 1984–85 season, coming on as a substitute away at Morecambe on 29 December. He went on to score one goal in three appearances as Macclesfield finished as runners-up to Stafford Rangers in the Northern Premier League. He featured 13 times in the 1985–86 season, before scoring seven goals in 17 appearances as Macclesfield won the Northern Premier League title in 1986–87. Macclesfield went on to secure a treble after winning the Northern Premier League President's Cup and beating Burton Albion 2–0 in the Northern Premier League Challenge Cup final at Maine Road.

Macclesfield played in the Football Conference for the first time in the 1987–88 season, and Askey scored 18 goals in 59 games as Town posted an 11th-place finish. Macclesfield also reached the final of the Cheshire Senior Cup, losing 2–1 to Runcorn at Gresty Road. He scored 13 goals in 51 matches in the 1988–89 season as the club rose to seventh-place; he was named as the club's Player of the Year. In a repeat of the previous year's Cheshire Senior Cup final, they again were beaten finalists by Runcorn. They rose to the fourth spot in 1989–90, with Askey contributing 12 goals from 49 games. He also toured Japan with the Middlesex Wanderers amateurs. Macclesfield also reached the finals of both the Cheshire Senior Cup and Staffordshire Senior Cup, losing out to Hyde United and Northwich Victoria respectively. Askey made his only appearance for the England national semi-pro team on 6 March 1990 in a 0–0 draw with Wales at Penydarren Park in a friendly. His 15 goals in 46 games for Macclesfield in the 1990–91 season left him as the division's joint-13th top-scorer. Macclesfield also finally won the Cheshire Senior Cup, beating Witton Albion 2–0 in the final at Gresty Road. He reached ten goals in 47 games in the 1991–92 season as Macclesfield dropped down to 13th place; they did, though, retain the Cheshire Senior Cup with another 2–0 win over Witton Albion, this time at Prenton Park.

The decline continued into the 1992–93 season as Macclesfield finished just two points above the relegation zone. Askey scored 13 goals in 53 games in the 1993–94 season, including a hat-trick in a 6–1 win over Gateshead on 6 November; Macclesfield improved under new manager Sammy McIlroy, finishing seventh and picking up a cup double, winning the Bob Lord Challenge Trophy after beating Yeovil Town in the final and lifting the Staffordshire Senior Cup for the first time after beating Wednesfield in the final. He went on to score 12 goals in 41 league games as Macclesfield won the Conference title in 1994–95. Still, the club failed to gain Football League status as Moss Rose failed to meet the required capacity requirements. Askey broke his leg in a pre-season friendly with Winsford United and missed the entire 1995–96 season due to a broken leg, leaving him unable to play in the FA Trophy and Bob Lord Challenge Trophy finals. He marked his return to fitness with 11 goals in 49 league games in the 1996–97 season as Macclesfield won their second Conference title, this time securing a place in the Football League. Town also won the Staffordshire Senior Cup by beating Bilston Town and reached the finals of the Cheshire Senior Cup and Bob Lord Challenge Trophy, losing out to Hyde United and Kidderminster Harriers respectively.

Macclesfield won promotion in their maiden Football League season, finishing runners-up to Notts County and thereby winning promotion out of the Third Division at the end of the 1997–98 season. It was at this point that, at the age of 34, he finally turned fully professional; speaking in 2020, he said,"I just thought, well we are playing teams like Man City, Stoke, Burnley and Preston. I'll just go full time for a year and enjoy myself and get myself really fit. That's what I did and I have been full time ever since." However, they finished bottom of the Second Division in 1998–99, despite Askey contributing seven goals from 46 games. Again consistent back in the Third Division in the 1999–2000 season, Askey was again named the club's Player of the Year after scoring 15 goals from 41 starts and four substitute appearances. The 2000–01 season would prove his last as a key first-team member; however, his three goals in 43 games helped Town to a mid-table finish. He was limited to 19 appearances throughout the 2001–02 season by new manager David Moss and he scored in his final match for the club on the last day of the 2002–03 season, against Rochdale. His total of 155 goals in 679 league and cup appearances made him the club's record appearance holder and fourth highest goalscorer. He was voted as the club's PFA Fans' Favourites and cult hero in 2005.

== Style of play ==
Askey was a winger with a high scoring rate. He was known as a skilful and intelligent player, and was also adept as a striker.

== Management career ==
=== Macclesfield Town ===
Askey worked at Macclesfield Town as reserve-team manager, leading the reserves to the Football Combination Division Two title. He went on to work as assistant manager to David Moss before taking over as caretaker manager on 27 October 2003 when Moss was dismissed with the club in 20th place in the Third Division. He was appointed permanently in December after winning three of his seven matches in caretaker charge. Askey was demoted to assistant manager to new manager Brian Horton on 1 April 2004 with Macclesfield second from bottom of the Third Division. Horton managed to steer the club out of the Third Division relegation zone. Askey stayed on as assistant manager and with the arrival of Paul Ince, moved on to work as youth team manager.

After remaining at the club as youth and reserve-team manager, Askey was again given charge of the first-team at Macclesfield on a caretaker basis on 3 April 2013 when manager Steve King was dismissed. His appointment was made permanent on 4 June despite him losing four of his five matches in caretaker charge. He took the club to the third round of the FA Cup and 15th in the Conference Premier in the 2013–14 season, and was given a one-year rolling contract in the summer, though budget cutbacks meant that he lost the services of assistant manager Efe Sodje. Named as Conference Premier Manager of the Month award for January 2015 after his team recorded three victories, he led the club to a sixth-place finish in the 2014–15 season, finishing just one point outside of the play-offs, and signed a new extended contract in the summer. He led the club to a tenth-place finish in 2015–16.

His Macclesfield team beat League One club Walsall in the first round of the 2016–17 FA Cup, becoming the only non-League club to beat an English Football League team in the opening round that season; Askey said "it is massive as it means we can pay the VAT bill this week". Macclesfield finished the season in ninth place and also reached the 2017 FA Trophy final at Wembley Stadium, where they were beaten 3–2 by York City. However, many of the squad left at the end of the season as Macclesfield were unable to compete financially with many of their divisional rivals; George Pilkington, Mitch Hancox and Danny Whitaker being some of the few players who remained. He won the National League Manager of the Month award for December 2017. Macclesfield endured a difficult season off the pitch during the 2017–18 season, as financial problems meant that players went unpaid in January despite the wage bill being one of the lowest in the division. Despite these restrictions, Askey managed to guide Macclesfield to promotion back to the Football League as champions of the National League on a budget of £350,000.

=== Shrewsbury Town ===
On 1 June 2018, Askey succeeded Paul Hurst as manager of League One club Shrewsbury Town. Signing a three-year contract, he said "My hopes are to get Shrewsbury promoted. Whether that will be next season, or in another year or two, you've got to aim high". He appointed John Filan, whom he had previously worked with at Macclesfield, as his assistant, whilst retaining the services of goalkeeping coach Danny Coyne and physiotherapist Chris Skitt as his backroom staff. He was dismissed on 12 November 2018 following a 1–1 draw with non-League Salford City in the FA Cup first round; he had won just five of his 21 matches in charge and left the club 18th in League One.

"He inherited a squad that narrowly missed out on promotion to the Championship in May, but in reality, he had a big rebuilding job to replace last season's stars – Jon Nolan, Dean Henderson, Toto Nsiala, Alex Rodman, Stefan Payne, Ben Godfrey and Carlton Morris. The timing of his appointment and the consequences of several high-profile departures in the transfer window with just days to go all made Askey's job even harder to emulate the club's success under Paul Hurst."

— BBC Shropshire's Nick Southall felt that the Shrewsbury job something of a poisoned chalice for Askey.

=== Port Vale ===
On 4 February 2019, Askey was appointed manager of League Two club Port Vale on a contract until the end of the 2018–19 season, and named Dave Kevan as his assistant. He said joining the club "feels like coming home". Vale boasted the tenth-largest playing budget in League Two but were underperforming in 18th-place. There was no 'new manager bounce' as Vale fell to four defeats in his first four games, though his coaching methods eventually paid off with an impressive 2–1 win over promotion-chasing Mansfield Town on 9 March. He was named EFL manager of the week after he made two attacking substitutions and reorganised the team's 4–3–3 system to a 4–4–1 formation following a sending off for Leon Legge at Northampton Town on 30 March, inspiring his team to come from 1–0 behind to win 2–1. He was nominated for that month's League Two Manager of the Month award, having secured 11 points from six games to ease relegation fears. Vale ended the season in 20th-place after securing 16 points from Askey's 16 games in charge and he signed a new three-year contract in May 2019, two weeks after Carol and Kevin Shanahan bought the club from Norman Smurthwaite.

Askey let 14 players go and signed 14 new players for the 2019–20 season, with big names departing, including Ben Whitfield, Luke Hannant and Ricky Miller, whilst backup goalkeeper Sam Hornby chose to leave after rejecting a new contract offer. Coming into the club were goalkeeper Jonny Maddison; defenders Adam Crookes, Kieran Kennedy and Shaun Brisley; midfielders Scott Burgess, Ryan Lloyd, Callum Evans, Alex Hurst and Jake Taylor (on loan); wingers David Amoo and Rhys Browne; and strikers Mark Cullen, Richie Bennett and Jordan McFarlane-Archer. He was again nominated for the League Two Manager of the Month, with the EFL writing that "Slow and steady has been Vale's progress under Askey's astute management this season. Their consistency in February – three wins, three draws and 12 goals from six games – finally lifted his side into the play-off positions." However, the club were one place outside the play-offs when the season was called off due to the COVID-19 pandemic in England.

Askey confirmed that eight players would be offered new contracts for the 2020–21 season, whilst six players would be released. He signed seven players to replace the departures: Devante Rodney, Zak Mills, Danny Whitehead, Theo Robinson, David Fitzpatrick, Dino Visser and Harry McKirdy. He was nominated for the League Two Manager of the Month award for September after his team had secured seven points from nine without conceding a goal. However, he came under pressure by the end of November after losing five matches in succession. The losing run was ended with a 6–3 victory at Bolton Wanderers on 5 December. This was followed by two draws and then a 4–3 defeat to Walsall in which Askey's team lead 2–0 at the interval. This led to further mounting pressure with Askey calling their second-half performance as "schoolboy defending at its worst". A 2–0 defeat to Barrow on 26 December led him to admit that "the wheels have just fallen off" the club's promotion campaign as they slipped to 17th in the table. He was dismissed by Vale on 4 January 2021 after a six-match run without a win left the team 17th in League Two. He returned to Macclesfield, now a phoenix club in the North West Counties League Premier Division, to mentor manager Danny Whitaker on a short-term basis in August.

=== York City ===
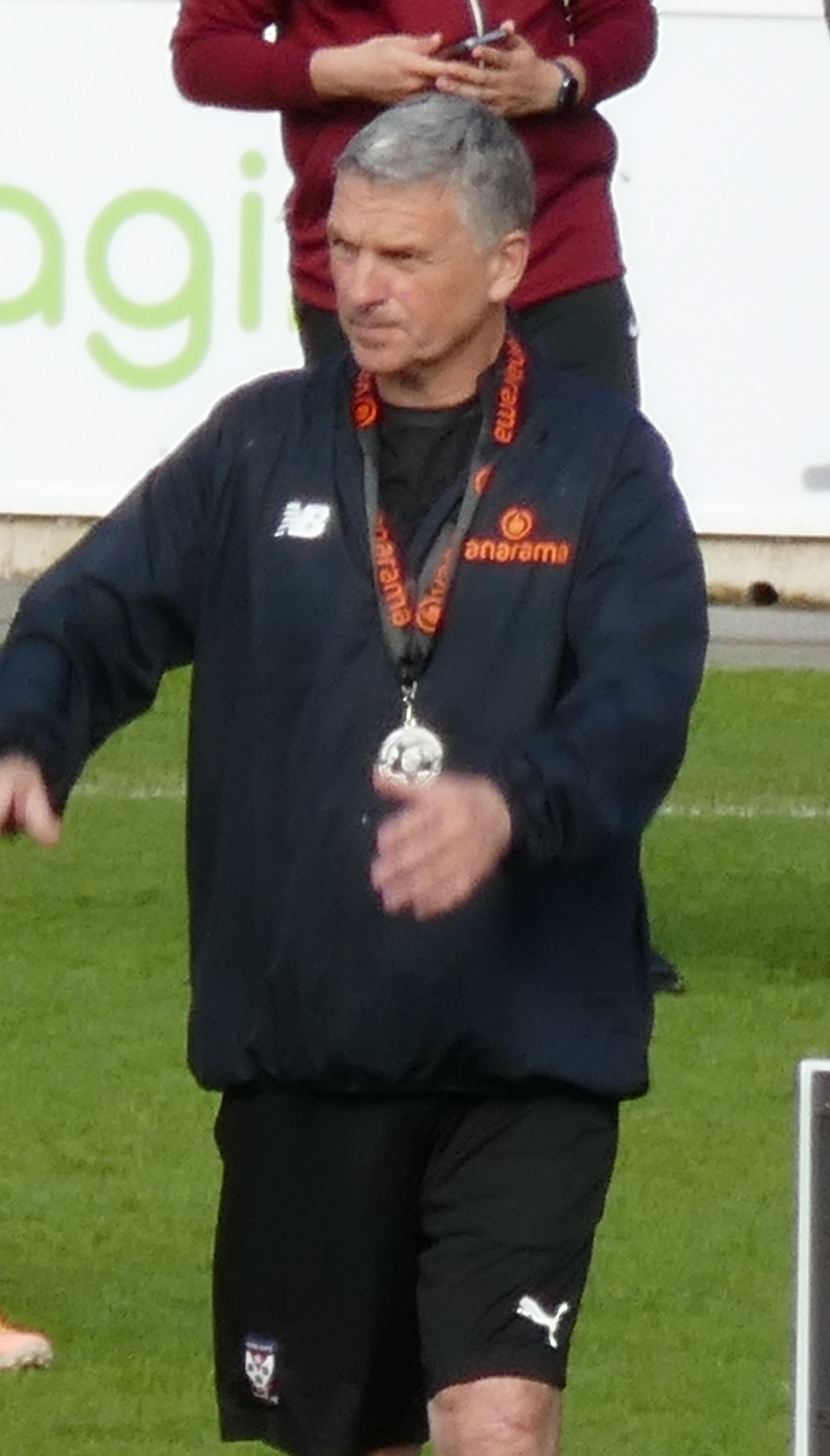
Askey after managing York City in the 2022 National League North play-off final

Askey joined the management team at National League North club York City in November 2021 "to support Steve Watson on a temporary basis" while assistant manager Micky Cummins was suspended pending betting charges. The pair had previously worked together when Askey employed Watson as his assistant at Macclesfield. After just one match with this arrangement, Watson was dismissed on 13 November and Askey took over as interim manager for the rest of the 2021–22 season. Askey was awarded the Manager of the Month award for February 2022 after leading his team to a 100% win record and the quarter-final of the FA Trophy. He was named as the club's permanent manager on 24 March. Having been eleventh when Askey arrived at York, they ended the 2021–22 season in fifth place to qualify for the play-offs.

York advanced past Chorley and Brackley Town to reach the play-off final. Askey admitted that "I didn't think we could do it" as the club had to play so much football after having many games called off over the Christmas period. Promotion was then secured by beating Boston United 2–0 in the play-off final and Askey said that "to do it in the centenary year and in the new ground [York Community Stadium], hopefully this is a new start for the football club". On 16 November 2022, Askey was dismissed with the club in 12th position of the National League. The club statement admitted that: "Given John's popularity and his incredible success last season, we understand that many fans may be upset and confused by this decision". Chairman Glen Henderson had previously admitted to rising tensions between the board and manager.

=== Hartlepool United ===
Askey was appointed manager of League Two club Hartlepool United on 23 February 2023 after Keith Curle was dismissed, with the club sitting just one point above the relegation zone but having played four more games than 23rd-place Crawley Town. Hartlepool remained unbeaten in Askey's first eight matches before a 2–0 defeat away to Newport County on 15 April. However, Askey could not prevent Hartlepool from being relegated to the National League despite a 3–1 home victory against Barrow in the penultimate match of the season.

After Hartlepool won three of their first four National League matches of the 2023–24 season, Askey signed a new contract until the summer of 2026. However, on 30 December 2023, Askey was dismissed as the Hartlepool manager following a defeat to Oldham Athletic. This defeat had left Hartlepool in 17th position in the National League having won three of their previous 19 league matches.

=== Truro City ===
On 6 June 2024, Askey was appointed manager of National League South club Truro City on a multi-year contract with the expectation of a fight against relegation. He was named as National League South Manager of the Week following a 1–0 win over league leaders Hemel Hempstead Town on 5 October. He signed a new multi-year contract in December with the club fourth in the table. He was named Manager of the Month following four wins from five games in April. Truro ended the 2024–25 season as champions with 26 wins from 46 games to win a place in the fifth tier for the first time in the history of Cornish football. He was later named National League South Manager of the Season for his side's success.

Truro were bottom of the National League at Christmas 2025 after suffering five straight losses, though they won on Boxing Day to take themselves within three points of safety. Truro were relegated in last place at the end of the 2025–26 season, in the club's first season as a professional club, and Askey said that the club had "learned from the experience". He was nominated as National League South Manager of the Month for October 2026 after an unbeaten run took them to the top of the division.

== Managerial style ==
Askey has a reputation for playing attractive football and for managing teams on a budget by spotting ability in young players and helping revive the careers of players whose careers had stalled. His favoured formation is a 4–3–3 and he prefers to play with a high-tempo, pressing style. Former player Adam Yates said that Askey was a hard working coach who was open to input from his players and did not hold a grudge; in terms of tactics he felt Askey was "quite fond of the three in midfield and three up top". Macclesfield and Port Vale defender Kieran Kennedy said that Askey liked to play passing football but also "he had a plan B, C and D which really helped us if we were up against it." Football agent Phil Sproson described Askey as "an attack-minded manager".

== Personal life ==
His father, Colin Askey, had a 15-year career in the Football League, spent mostly with Port Vale. His brother, Bob Askey, managed Newcastle Town. Macclesfield council named Askey 'Honorary Freeman of Macclesfield' in a ceremony in August 2018. When Macclesfield Town was liquidated in September 2020 over debts exceeding £500,000, it was revealed that Askey was personally owed £173,000 by the club.

== Career statistics ==
Appearances and goals by club, season and competition
Club	Season	League			FA Cup		League cup (Note: Includes Football League Cup, Northern Premier League Challenge Cup, Bob Lord Challenge Trophy)		Other		Total	
Club	Season	Division	Apps	Goals	Apps	Goals	Apps	Goals	Apps	Goals	Apps	Goals
Port Vale	1982–83	Fourth Division	0	0	0	0	0	0	0	0	0	0
Macclesfield Town	1984–85	Northern Premier League	2	1	0	0	1	0	0	0	3	1
Macclesfield Town	1985–86	Northern Premier League	9	0	1	1	1	0	2 (Note: Appearances in Northern Premier League President's Cup)	0	13	1
Macclesfield Town	1986–87	Northern Premier League	10	2	0	0	3	4	4	1	17	7
Macclesfield Town	1987–88	Football Conference	41	10	9	4	1	1	8 (Note: Four appearances and two goals in FA Trophy, four appearances and one goal in Cheshire Senior Cup)	3	59	18
Macclesfield Town	1988–89	Football Conference	35	11	2	0	1	0	13 (Note: Eight appearances and two goals in FA Trophy, four appearances in Cheshire Senior Cup, one in Staffordshire Senior Cup)	2	51	13
Macclesfield Town	1989–90	Football Conference	33	9	2	0	1	0	13 (Note: Three appearances in FA Trophy, five appearances and one goal in Cheshire Senior Cup, five appearances and two goals in Staffordshire Senior Cup)	3	49	12
Macclesfield Town	1990–91	Football Conference	39	14	2	0	0	0	5 (Note: One appearance in FA Trophy, four appearances and one goal in Cheshire Senior Cup)	1	46	15
Macclesfield Town	1991–92	Football Conference	33	5	2	1	2	1	10 (Note: Six appearances and one goal in FA Trophy, four appearances and two goals in Cheshire Senior Cup)	3	47	10
Macclesfield Town	1992–93	Football Conference	31	7	8	1	4	0	2 (Note: Appearances in FA Trophy)	0	45	8
Macclesfield Town	1993–94	Football Conference	30	3	3	1	7	4	13 (Note: Five appearances and one goal in FA Trophy, two appearances and one goal in Cheshire Senior Cup, six appearances and three goals in Staffordshire Senior Cup)	5	53	13
Macclesfield Town	1994–95	Football Conference	30	9	2	0	3	1	6 (Note: Four appearances in FA Trophy, one in Cheshire Senior Cup, one appearance and two goals in Staffordshire Senior Cup)	2	41	12
Macclesfield Town	1995–96	Football Conference	0	0	0	0	0	0	0	0	0	0
Macclesfield Town	1996–97	Football Conference	37	7	0	0	2	0	10 (Note: One appearance in FA Trophy, four appearances and two goals in Cheshire Senior Cup, four appearances and two goals in Staffordshire Senior Cup, one appearance in JT Thompson Shield)	4	49	11
Macclesfield Town	1997–98	Third Division	39	6	0	0	2	0	1 (Note: Appearance in Football League Trophy)	0	42	6
Macclesfield Town	1998–99	Second Division	38	4	4	1	4	2	0	0	46	7
Macclesfield Town	1999–2000	Third Division	40	15	2	0	2	0	1	0	45	15
Macclesfield Town	2000–01	Third Division	37	3	1	0	4	0	1	0	43	3
Macclesfield Town	2001–02	Third Division	18	1	1	0	0	0	0	0	19	1
Macclesfield Town	2002–03	Third Division	9	2	1	0	1	0	0	0	11	2
Macclesfield Town	Total		511	109	40	9	39	13	89	24	679	155
Career total			511	109	40	9	39	13	89	24	679	155

== Managerial statistics ==
As of match played 17 November 2026

Managerial record by team and tenure
Team	From	To	Record					Ref.
Team	From	To	P	W	D	L	Win %	Ref.
Macclesfield Town	27 October 2003	1 April 2004	27	7	8	12	25.9	
Macclesfield Town	3 April 2013	1 June 2018	267	120	58	89	44.9	
Shrewsbury Town	1 June 2018	12 November 2018	21	5	8	8	23.8	
Port Vale	4 February 2019	4 January 2021	91	34	25	32	37.4	
York City	13 November 2021 (Note: Askey was appointed by York City on 13 November 2021 after the team's 0–0 draw with Curzon Ashton earlier the same day. The match had been taken by Steve Watson before his dismissal.)	16 November 2022	59	27	15	17	45.8	
Hartlepool United	23 February 2023	30 December 2023	41	12	11	18	29.3	
Truro City	6 June 2024	Present	127	53	29	45	41.7	
Total			633	258	154	221	40.8	

== Honours ==
=== As a player ===
Macclesfield Town

- Football League Third Division second-place promotion: 1997–98
- Football Conference: 1994–95, 1996–97
- Northern Premier League: 1986–87; runner-up: 1984–85
- Northern Premier League Challenge Cup: 1986–87
- Northern Premier League President's Cup: 1986–87
- Cheshire Senior Cup: 1990–91, 1991–92; runner-up: 1987–88, 1988–89, 1989–90
- Bob Lord Challenge Trophy: 1993–94; runner-up: 1996–97
- Staffordshire Senior Cup: 1993–94, 1996–97; runner-up: 1989–90

Individual

- Macclesfield Town Player of the Year: 1988–89, 1999–2000

=== As a manager ===
Macclesfield Town

- National League: 2017–18
- FA Trophy runner-up: 2016–17
- Cheshire Senior Cup: 2014–15

York City

- National League North play-offs: 2022

Truro City

- National League South: 2024–25

Individual

- National League South Manager of the Season: 2024–25
- Conference Premier / National League Manager of the Month: January 2015, December 2017
- National League North Manager of the Month: February 2022
- National League South Manager of the Month: April 2025
