= Callum Evans =

English footballer (born 1995)

Personal information
- Full name: Callum Leeroy Evans
- Date of birth: 11 October 1995 (age 31)
- Place of birth: Bristol, England
- Height: 1.77 m (5 ft 9 1/2 in)
- Positions: Right-back; left-back; midfielder

Youth career
- 2010–2015: Manchester United

Senior career*
Years	Team	Apps	(Gls)
2015–2017	Barnsley	3	(0)
2017	→ Macclesfield Town (loan)	2	(0)
2017–2018	Forest Green Rovers	2	(0)
2017	→ Torquay United (loan)	10	(0)
2018	→ Macclesfield Town (loan)	14	(0)
2018–2019	Macclesfield Town	14	(1)
2019–2020	Port Vale	5	(0)
2020–2022	Bath City	6	(0)
2022–2023	Frome Town	15	(0)
Total		71	(1)
- * Club domestic league appearances and goals

Callum Leeroy Evans (born 11 October 1995) is an English former footballer who played as a right-back. A pacey player, he could also play at left-back or in central midfield.

A graduate of the Academy at Manchester United, he signed with Barnsley in July 2015. He made his debut in senior football in January 2017 and was loaned out to Macclesfield Town the following month. He joined Forest Green Rovers in May 2017, from where he was loaned out to Torquay United four months later. He returned on loan to Macclesfield Town in January 2018. He helped the club to win promotion into the English Football League as champions of the National League at the end of the 2017–18 season. He joined Macclesfield permanently in May 2018 before moving to Port Vale in July 2019. He returned to non-League football with Bath City in August 2020 before moving on to Frome Town in January 2022.

== Career ==
=== Barnsley ===
Evans joined Manchester United as a 14-year-old and progressed through the club's youth system, making it into Warren Joyce's under-21 side by October 2014. He left Old Trafford when he was released in June 2015. He joined Barnsley on a one-year deal the following month to link up with the "Tykes" under-21s squad and upon the expiry of that contract the club opted to extend his contract for a further year.

On 28 January 2017, he made his Championship debut in a 1–0 win at Rotherham United, coming on as a 60th-minute substitute for left-back Aidy White. With White injured, manager Paul Heckingbottom gave Evans his first start followed three days later, in a 3–1 defeat to Wolverhampton Wanderers at Oakwell. On 17 February, Evans signed for National League side Macclesfield Town on loan until the end of the 2016–17 season. Having featured just three times for both Barnsley and Macclesfield, he was released by Barnsley in May 2017.

=== Forest Green Rovers ===
On 22 May 2017, Evans signed for newly-promoted League Two side Forest Green Rovers on a one-year contract. Rovers manager Mark Cooper stated that "you don't spend four years at Manchester United if you're a mug". He made his debut at The New Lawn on the opening day of the 2017–18 campaign, a 2–2 draw with Barnet, but was substituted on 68 minutes and subsequently dropped from the first-team. On 15 September, he returned to the National League on a three-month loan deal at Gary Owers's Torquay United. He made 12 appearances for the "Gulls" before returning to Forest Green after his loan spell at Plainmoor expired. He appeared for the Green in a 2–1 defeat to Wycombe Wanderers on New Year's Day but was taken off just before half-time. He was released by Forest Green in May 2018.

=== Macclesfield Town ===
Evans re-joined Macclesfield Town for a second loan spell on 15 January 2018. He featured in 14 games as the club won promotion into the English Football League as champions of the National League at the end of the 2017–18 season. He was offered a permanent contract at Macclesfield by manager John Askey in May 2018. However, he was used mainly as a squad player at Moss Rose by both Mark Yates and Sol Campbell in the 2018–19 campaign. He did though manage to score his first goal in professional football on 2 February, hitting the net from 15 yards (14 m) in a 3–1 defeat at Mansfield Town.

=== Port Vale ===
On 20 July 2019, Evans signed a one-year deal with League Two side Port Vale, who were managed by former Macclesfield boss John Askey. He started the 2019–20 season on the bench, with James Gibbons preferred at right-back. He made his debut for the "Valiants" on 3 September, in 2–1 victory over Shrewsbury Town in an EFL Trophy tie at Vale Park. He played a total of just nine games, which just one start, and was released by Port Vale at the end of the season.

=== Later career ===
On 11 August 2020, Evans joined National League South club Bath City; manager Jerry Gill stated that "Callum brings a desire, work ethic and obvious technical ability and is keen to develop his game further". He played eight games in the 2020–21 season, which was curtailed early due to the COVID-19 pandemic in England.

On 22 January 2022, Evans signed with Frome Town on a contract to run until the end of the 2021–22 season. He played eight games as the "Robins" posted a second-place finish in the league, including the play-off semi-final defeat to Bristol Manor Farm. He played eleven games in the 2022–23 campaign before leaving the club in January 2023, with manager Danny Greaves explaining he wanted to take a break from the game.

== Style of play ==
Evans preferred to play at right-back but could also provide cover at left-back and central midfield. He was blessed with natural pace and had good passing skills.

== Career statistics ==
Appearances and goals by club, season and competition
Club	Season	League			FA Cup		League Cup		Other		Total	
Club	Season	Division	Apps	Goals	Apps	Goals	Apps	Goals	Apps	Goals	Apps	Goals
Barnsley	2016–17	Championship	3	0	0	0	0	0	—		3	0
Macclesfield Town (loan)	2016–17	National League	2	0	0	0	—		1 (Note: Appearance in the FA Trophy)	0	3	0
Forest Green Rovers	2017–18	League Two	2	0	0	0	0	0	0	0	2	0
Torquay United (loan)	2017–18	National League	10	0	1	0	—		1	0	12	0
Macclesfield Town (loan)	2017–18	National League	14	0	0	0	—		0	0	14	0
Macclesfield Town	2018–19	League Two	14	1	0	0	1	0	3 (Note: Appearance in the EFL Trophy)	0	18	1
Macclesfield Town	Total		28	1	0	0	1	0	3	0	32	1
Port Vale	2019–20	League Two	5	0	1	0	0	0	3	0	9	0
Bath City	2020–21	National League South	6	0	1	0	—		1	0	8	0
Frome Town	2021–22	Southern League; Division One South	6	0	0	0	—		2	0	8	0
Frome Town	2022–23	Southern League; Division One South	9	0	1	0	—		1	0	11	0
Frome Town	Total		15	0	1	0	0	0	3	0	19	0
Career total			71	1	4	0	1	0	12	0	88	1

== Honours ==
Macclesfield Town

- National League: 2017–18
