= Alex Hurst (footballer) =

English footballer

Personal information
- Full name: Alexander Charles Hurst
- Date of birth: 6 October 1999 (age 27)
- Place of birth: Stoke-on-Trent, England
- Height: 5 ft 8 in (1.73 m)
- Positions: Midfielder; left-back; forward

Team information
- Current team: Leek Town

Youth career
- Crewe Alexandra

Senior career*
Years	Team	Apps	(Gls)
2018	Matlock Town	7	(0)
2018–2019	Bradford (Park Avenue)	25	(1)
2019–2022	Port Vale	21	(1)
2019–2020	→ Bradford (Park Avenue) (loan)	32	(0)
2022–2023	York City	38	(2)
2023–2024	Macclesfield	13	(0)
2024–	Leek Town		
- * Club domestic league appearances and goals as of 20:23, 26 April 2026 (UTC)

Alexander Charles Hurst (born 6 October 1999) is an English professional footballer who plays as a midfielder for Northern Premier League Premier Division club Leek Town.

A former Academy player at Crewe Alexandra, he won a move from Matlock Town to Bradford (Park Avenue) in October 2018, before being picked up by Port Vale in August 2019. He returned on loan at Bradford (Park Avenue) during the 2019–20 season. He played 26 games for Port Vale in the 2020–21 season but featured just twice the following season and joined York City in June 2022. He signed with Macclesfield in September 2023 before he joined Leek Town in June 2024.

== Career ==
=== Early career ===
Hurst came through the Academy at Crewe Alexandra and played for the "Railwaymen" at under-18 and under-23 level. He joined Northern Premier League Premier Division side Matlock Town in August 2018 after impressing "Gladiators" boss Dave Hoole on trial. He was signed by National League North club Bradford (Park Avenue) on 19 October 2018. He made his debut for the Avenue the following day, and after coming on for Nicky Wroe as a 68th-minute substitute went and scored a goal with five minutes in what finished as a 6–0 victory at Nuneaton Borough. He was handed his first start by manager Mark Bower on Boxing day, as Bradford recorded a 5–1 victory at Guiseley. He ended the 2018–19 season with 13 starts and 12 substitute appearances to his name, including a brief cameo in a 1–0 defeat at Spennymoor Town in the play-off quarter-finals.

=== Port Vale ===
On 3 August 2019, Hurst signed a two-year contract with English Football League side Port Vale after impressing manager John Askey on trial, though was immediately returned to Bradford (Park Avenue) on a five-month loan deal. Bradford manager Garry Thompson said that "He's worked hard and deserves everything he's got. Whilst we naturally want to keep our best players, the transfer shows that we are committed to developing talent but also won't stand in anyone's way to progress." On 24 September, he made his debut for the "Valiants" in a 3–2 victory at Macclesfield Town in the EFL Trophy, coming on as a 90th-minute substitute for Scott Burgess; the rules of the competition meant that he was able to play for the club during his loan spell at Bradford. On 23 January, the loan deal was extended until the end of the 2019–20 season. Bradford remained rooted to the foot of the table, though Vale coach Dave Kevan felt the experience was character building for Hurst.

He scored his first goal for the club on 10 November 2020, with a 15 yards (14 m) strike in a 4–2 win over Liverpool U21 in the group stages of the EFL Trophy. He made his League Two debut on 5 December, coming on as a 69th-minute substitute for Cristian Montaño in a 6–3 victory at Bolton Wanderers. He made his first start in the EFL seven days later, and Askey said that "for an hour I thought he was excellent" in the 1–1 draw with Colchester United at Vale Park. He scored his first goal in the English Football League on 6 March, during a 3–2 defeat at Cheltenham Town. He signed a new two-year contract the following month, with manager Darrell Clarke commenting that "we are very much looking forward to seeing Hursty continue his development". However, he played just two games in the 2021–22 promotion campaign, though director of football David Flitcroft said: "Alex has faced tough competition for game time here at Port Vale but has remained professional throughout and has played a key role as a member of our extended squad".

=== York City ===
On 20 June 2022, Hurst joined newly-promoted National League club York City for an undisclosed fee. The move saw Hurst once again play under John Askey, the manager who had signed him for Port Vale. He was sent off for a challenge on Frank Vincent in a 2–1 defeat at Aldershot Town on 22 October, though Askey said that he disagreed with the referee's decision. Hurst played 36 games in the 2022–23 season, scoring two goals.

=== Macclesfield ===
On 27 September 2023, Hurst signed for Northern Premier League Premier Division club Macclesfield on a deal until the end of the season. He played 24 games in the 2023–24 campaign and was released at the end of the season.

=== Leek Town ===
On 2 June 2024, Hurst joined newly-promoted Northern Premier League Premier Division side Leek Town. On 22 March, he scored a hat-trick in a 3–1 home win over Ashton United. He ended the 2024–25 season with 15 goals in 38 games.

== Style of play ==
Hurst has played as a left-sided midfielder, left-back, attacking midfielder or forward. He has been described as having pace, ball-control ability and strength.

== Career statistics ==
As of end of the 2025–26 season

Appearances and goals by club, season and competition
Club	Season	League			FA Cup		EFL Cup		Other		Total	
Club	Season	Division	Apps	Goals	Apps	Goals	Apps	Goals	Apps	Goals	Apps	Goals
Matlock Town	2018–19	NPL Premier Division	7	0	1	0	—		0	0	8	0
Bradford (Park Avenue)	2018–19	National League North	25	1	0	0	—		0	0	25	1
Port Vale	2019–20	League Two	0	0	0	0	0	0	1 (Note: Appearances in the EFL Trophy.)	0	1	0
Port Vale	2020–21	League Two	20	1	0	0	1	0	5	1	26	2
Port Vale	2021–22	League Two	1	0	0	0	0	0	1	0	2	0
Port Vale	Total		21	1	0	0	1	0	7	1	29	2
Bradford (Park Avenue) (loan)	2019–20	National League North	32	0	1	0	—		2 (Note: Appearances in the FA Trophy.)	0	35	0
York City	2022–23	National League	33	2	1	0	—		2	0	36	2
York City	2023–24	National League	5	0	0	0	—		0	0	5	0
York City	Total		38	2	1	0	0	0	2	0	41	2
Macclesfield	2023–24	NPL Premier Division	13	0	2	0	—		9 (Note: 6 appearances and 1 goal in the FA Trophy; 3 appearances in the Cheshire Senior Cup)	1	24	1
Leek Town	2024–25	NPL Premier Division	33	10	2	2	—		3 (Note: Appearances in the Staffordshire Senior Cup.)	3	38	15
Leek Town	2025–26 (Note: Statistics for the 2025–26 season not known.)	NPL Premier Division										
Leek Town	2026–27	NPL Premier Division	0	0	0	0	—		0	0	0	0
Career total			169	14	7	2	1	0	23	5	200	21
