= Adam Crookes =

English footballer

Personal information
- Full name: Adam Mark Crookes
- Date of birth: 18 November 1997 (age 28)
- Place of birth: Lincoln, England
- Height: 6 ft 0 in (1.83 m)
- Position: Defender

Team information
- Current team: Wroxham

Youth career
- St. Helen's
- Navenby
- 2005–2019: Nottingham Forest

Senior career*
| Years | Team | Apps | (Gls) |
| 2017–2019 | Nottingham Forest | 0 | (0) |
| 2017–2018 | → Guiseley (loan) | 15 | (0) |
| 2018–2019 | → Lincoln City (loan) | 0 | (0) |
| 2019 | → Port Vale (loan) | 19 | (0) |
| 2019–2021 | Port Vale | 30 | (1) |
| 2021–2022 | Grimsby Town | 24 | (0) |
| 2022–2025 | York City | 56 | (6) |
| 2025–2026 | Gainsborough Trinity | 30 | (0) |
| 2026– | Wroxham | 3 | (0) |
- * Club domestic league appearances and goals as of 17:00, 31 October 2026 (UTC)

Adam Mark Crookes (born 18 November 1997) is an English semi-professional footballer who plays as a defender for Isthmian League North Division club Wroxham.

A graduate of the Nottingham Forest Academy, he captained the under-18's to the Professional Development League 2 title in the 2015–16 season. He spent part of the 2017–18 campaign on loan at Guiseley and was loaned out to Lincoln City and Port Vale the following season, before joining Vale permanently on a two-year contract in May 2019. He signed with Grimsby Town in July 2021 and moved on to York City in June 2022. He spent three seasons with York before he joined Gainsborough Trinity in June 2025. He stayed with Gainsborough for the 2025–26 season before moving on to Wroxham.

== Early and personal life ==
Born in Lincoln, Crookes attended Priory City of Lincoln Academy. His agent is Phil Sproson.

== Career ==
=== Nottingham Forest ===
Crookes began his career with St. Helen's and Navenby before signing for Nottingham Forest at eight. He captained Forest's under-18 team to the Professional Development U18 League 2 title and the fifth round of the FA Youth Cup in the 2015–16 season. In an interview with the Nottingham Post in November 2017, he said that, "I thought I've been playing quite strongly and hopefully I can push on, and maybe the gaffer (Mark Warburton) is going to have a look at me. If not, I'll look to go on loan." He moved on loan to struggling National League side Guiseley the following month. He made his senior debut on 20 December, in a 2–1 defeat at Gateshead in the FA Trophy. He made his league debut at Nethermoor Park three days later in a 1–1 draw with Aldershot Town. Having established himself in the first-team for Paul Cox's "Lions", the loan was later extended until the end of the 2017–18 season. However, he was recalled by Forest manager Aitor Karanka in March 2018, after making 16 appearances.

He moved on loan to his hometown club, Lincoln City, in August 2018 after impressing manager Danny Cowley on trial. He made his debut in the EFL Cup on 28 August, as the "Imps" fell to a 4–1 defeat at Championship side Blackburn Rovers. However, he failed to break into the first-team for the League Two leaders and was recalled to the City Ground in January 2019, having made only four further EFL Trophy appearances at Sincil Bank.

=== Port Vale ===
On 14 January 2019, Crookes joined struggling League Two side Port Vale on loan for the remainder of the 2018–19 season. Manager Neil Aspin state that "A natural left-footer in the defence is something we've not had and he'll compete for a place". He made his debut in the English Football League in a 1–0 win at Crawley Town on 19 January. He maintained his first-team place under new manager John Askey, impressing both playing on the left of a back three and at left-back in a back four. Assistant manager Dave Kevan said that Crookes had good character and that the management team would monitor his availability in the summer. Nottingham Forest released Crookes on 13 May 2019. However, his agent Phil Sproson revealed that he had received contract offers from Vale and another, unnamed club. He signed a two-year deal with Port Vale on 31 May.

He began the 2019–20 season playing at left-back and said that he had been studying Liverpool full-back Andrew Robertson to improve his performance in the role. He maintained his first-team place until a "freakish training accident" saw him sidelined in late-October. He returned to training after a four-month layoff, but was unable to add to his 17 starts before the season was ended early due to the COVID-19 pandemic in England.

He struggled for playing time at the start of the 2020–21 season as he was behind centre-backs Nathan Smith, Leon Legge and Shaun Brisley in the pecking order, though impressed the management after filling in at left-back in the absence of Cristian Montaño and David Fitzpatrick. He scored his first goal in professional football on 30 January, in a 5–1 home win over Southend United. He started new manager Darrell Clarke's first two games in charge, playing left-back in a 4–4–2 and then left-sided centre-back in a 3–5–2 formation. However, he was one of 15 players released at the end of the season.

=== Grimsby Town ===
He signed a one-year contract with National League club Grimsby Town on 9 July 2021; manager Paul Hurst said he had been aware of Crookes for some time and that former manager Clarke had spoken well of him. He played 24 league games in the 2021–22 campaign, helping the "Mariners" to qualify for the play-offs with a sixth-place finish. Grimsby secured promotion with victory in the play-off final. However, Crookes was not in the matchday squad at London Stadium. On 11 June, the club announced their retained list and confirmed that Crookes would be released upon the expiry of his contract at the end of the month.

=== York City ===
On 30 June 2022, Crookes joined newly promoted National League club York City, alongside Grimsby teammate Scott Burgess, both of whom had played under York manager John Askey at Port Vale. He recovered from an injury early in the season and signed a two-and-a-half-year contract in January 2023. He was named in the National League Team of the Week on 9 April following good performances against Chesterfield and Barnet. He made 23 appearances in the 2023–24 season, after having missed the final six weeks with a hamstring injury.

He suffered a quad injury in August 2024 that kept him sidelined for six weeks; manager Adam Hinshelwood commented that he would be a "big miss". by the end of November, Crookes managed to win a place on the Vanarama Team of the Week for his goal and performance in a 6–2 victory over Maidenhead United at the York Community Stadium. However, he tore his calf in the new year and so was sidelined again for some weeks. When questioned about his injury record, Hinshelwood said that he was showing faith in Crookes and would not need to sign a replacement. He played 13 league games in the 2024–25 campaign and was released upon the expiry of his contract.

=== Non-League ===
On 2 June 2025, Crookes joined Northern Premier League Premier Division side Gainsborough Trinity. The move into semi-professional football allowed him to start a new career. Crookes made his competitive debut on 10 August 2025, starting in central defence in a 3–0 home defeat by Ashton United. He was used both in central defence and at left-back during the season, although his availability was affected by injury and illness during the winter. Crookes left Gainsborough following the conclusion of the 2025–26 season.

Crookes joined Isthmian League North Division club Wroxham during the summer of 2026. The club described him as a cultured left-sided defender and stated that manager Jordan Southgate had secured his signing despite competition from other clubs. His opening months with Wroxham were disrupted by an injury sustained during a defeat by Takeley in August. He returned following a lengthy absence on 10 October, helping Wroxham defeat Concord Rangers 3–1.

== Style of play ==
Crookes has been described as "a left-sided defender equally comfortable playing left-sided centre back or at left back [who] can also play as a defensive midfielder if required".

== Career statistics ==
As of match played 31 October 2026

Appearances and goals by club, season and competition
| Club | Season | League | | | FA Cup | | EFL Cup | | Other | | Total | |
| Club | Season | Division | Apps | Goals | Apps | Goals | Apps | Goals | Apps | Goals | Apps | Goals |
|---|---|---|---|---|---|---|---|---|---|---|---|---|
| Nottingham Forest | 2017–18 | Championship | 0 | 0 | 0 | 0 | 0 | 0 | — | | 0 | 0 |
| Nottingham Forest | 2018–19 | Championship | 0 | 0 | 0 | 0 | 0 | 0 | — | | 0 | 0 |
| Nottingham Forest | Total | | 0 | 0 | 0 | 0 | 0 | 0 | 0 | 0 | 0 | 0 |
| Guiseley (loan) | 2017–18 | National League | 15 | 0 | 0 | 0 | — | | 1 (Note: Appearance in the FA Trophy.) | 0 | 16 | 0 |
| Lincoln City (loan) | 2018–19 | League Two | 0 | 0 | 0 | 0 | 1 | 0 | 4 (Note: Appearances in the EFL Trophy.) | 0 | 5 | 0 |
| Port Vale (loan) | 2018–19 | League Two | 19 | 0 | — | | — | | 0 | 0 | 19 | 0 |
| Port Vale | 2019–20 | League Two | 14 | 0 | 0 | 0 | 1 | 0 | 2 | 0 | 17 | 0 |
| Port Vale | 2020–21 | League Two | 16 | 1 | 1 | 0 | 1 | 0 | 4 | 0 | 22 | 1 |
| Port Vale | Total | | 49 | 1 | 1 | 0 | 2 | 0 | 6 | 0 | 58 | 1 |
| Grimsby Town | 2021–22 | National League | 24 | 0 | 0 | 0 | — | | 1 | 0 | 25 | 0 |
| York City | 2022–23 | National League | 22 | 3 | 0 | 0 | — | | 4 | 0 | 26 | 3 |
| York City | 2023–24 | National League | 21 | 2 | 2 | 0 | — | | 0 | 0 | 23 | 2 |
| York City | 2024–25 | National League | 13 | 1 | 1 | 0 | — | | 1 | 0 | 15 | 1 |
| York City | Total | | 56 | 6 | 3 | 0 | 0 | 0 | 5 | 0 | 64 | 6 |
| Wroxham | 2026–27 | Isthmian League; North Division | 4 | 0 | 0 | 0 | — | | 0 | 0 | 4 | 0 |
| Career total (Note: Statistics for Gainsborough Trinity are not known.) | | | 148 | 7 | 4 | 0 | 3 | 0 | 17 | 0 | 170 | 7 |

== Honours ==
Nottingham Forest

- Professional Development League 2: 2015–16
