= Eden Bailey =

English footballer (born 2004)

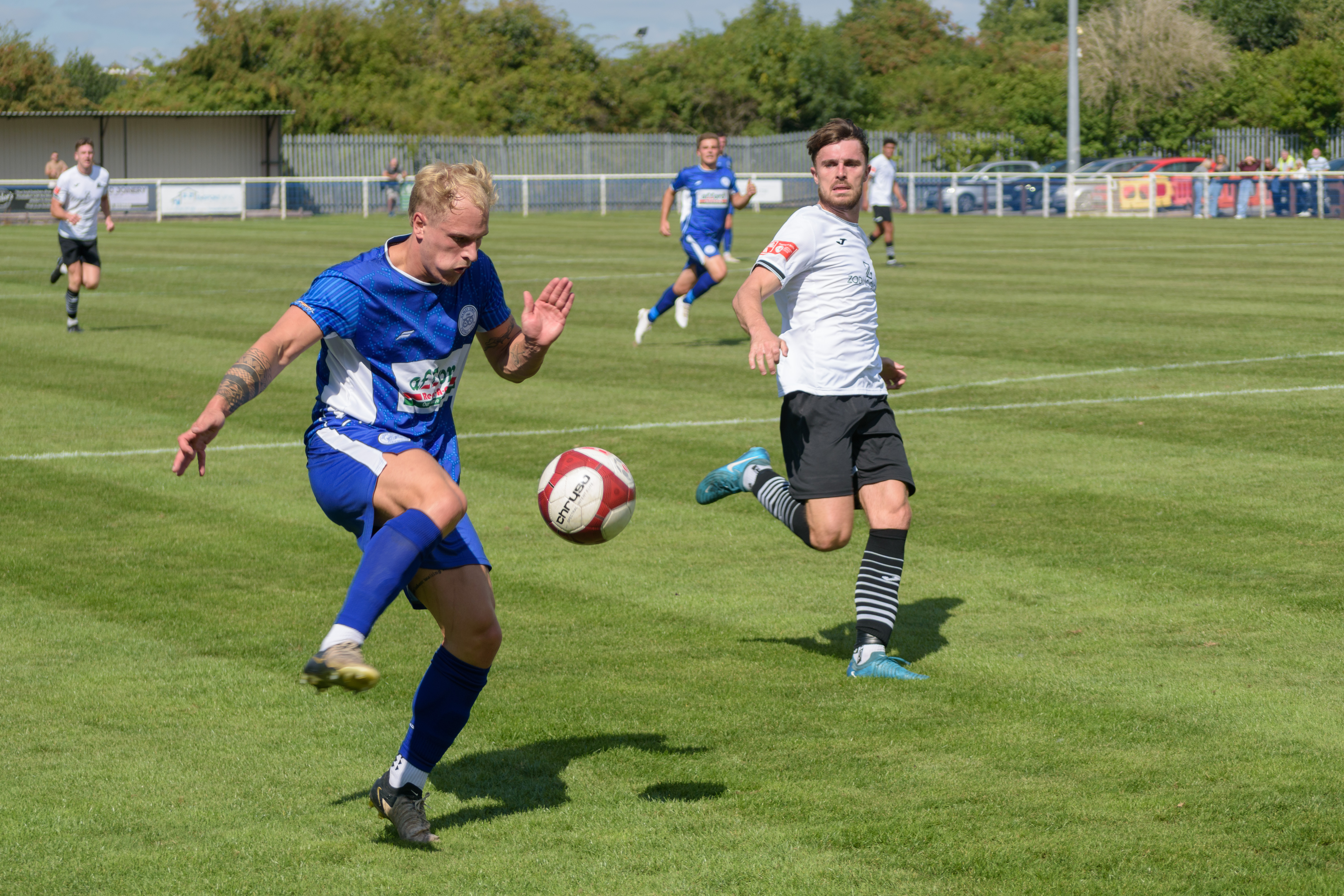
- Bailey (left) playing for Hanley Town in 2025

Personal information
- Full name: Eden Mark Bailey
- Date of birth: 4 February 2004 (age 22)
- Place of birth: Stoke-on-Trent, England
- Height: 1.78 m (5 ft 10 in)
- Position: Forward

Team information
- Current team: Hanley Town

Youth career
- 2012–2020: Port Vale

Senior career*
Years	Team	Apps	(Gls)
2020–2022	Port Vale	1	(0)
2022	→ Newcastle Town (loan)	9	(1)
2022–2023	Altrincham	0	(0)
2022–2023	→ Hanley Town (loan)	7	(2)
2023	→ Mossley (loan)	9	(5)
2023–2024	Mossley	17	(1)
2024	Clitheroe	3	(0)
2024	Hednesford Town	10	(1)
2024	Atherton Collieries	7	(0)
2024	City of Liverpool	7	(0)
2024–2025	1874 Northwich	22	(13)
2025–	Hanley Town		
- * Club domestic league appearances and goals as of 09:47, 7 May 2025 (UTC)

Eden Mark Bailey (born 4 February 2004) is an English professional footballer who plays as a forward for Northern Premier League Division One West club Hanley Town.

Bailey made his competitive debut at Port Vale in August 2021, though he was released at the end of the 2021–22 season following a short loan spell with Newcastle Town. He signed with Altrincham in November 2022 and was loaned out to Hanley Town and Mossley in the 2022–23 season. He joined Mossley permanently and then played for Clitheroe, Hednesford Town, Atherton Collieries, and City of Liverpool. He spent the 2024–25 season with 1874 Northwich, then moved on to Hanley Town in June 2025. He won the Midland League Premier Division title with Hanley in the 2025–26 campaign.

== Career ==
=== Port Vale ===
Bailey began his career at Port Vale at the age of eight and was named as Youth Player of the Year for the 2020–21 season. He made his first-team debut on 10 August 2021, coming on as a 75th-minute substitute for James Wilson in a 2–1 defeat to Sunderland in an EFL Cup first round fixture at Vale Park. He made his League Two debut as a substitute in a 2–1 defeat at Newport County on 11 December. On 12 March 2022, he joined Newcastle Town of the Northern Premier League Division One West on an initial one-month loan deal; he made his debut for Castle later that day in a 2–0 home defeat to Bootle. Port Vale youth team manager Billy Paynter said that "he played on the left of a three and was a threat, he had a very good game" and had recovered well from an ankle injury that had kept him out of action for two months earlier in the season. On 19 March, he scored his first career goal with a header 12 minutes into a 2–2 draw at Mossley. He played a total of nine games for Newcastle. He was not offered a professional contract when his youth team contract expired in June 2022.

=== Non-League ===
On 17 November 2022, Bailey signed for National League club Altrincham, immediately joining Hanley Town of the Northern Premier League Division One West on loan until the end of the 2022–23 season. Altrincham manager Phil Parkinson said that he had "a real diamond on our hands". He was recalled in March. On 17 March, he joined Mossley on loan for the rest of the season, having scored against Mossley on his debut for Hanley. He was released at the end of the 2022–23 season. He signed with Mossley on 10 June 2023. On 15 February 2024, he signed with Clitheroe. Less than one month later, he joined Hednesford Town. He played 12 games in the remainder of the 2023–24 season, scoring two goals, including one in the Walsall Senior Cup semi-final defeat to Chasetown.

On 6 July 2024, Bailey joined Atherton Collieries. In October 2024, he joined City of Liverpool. On 30 November 2024, Bailey joined 1874 Northwich, the successor club to a team both his father and grandfather played for in Northwich Victoria. He made his debut in their 3–2 Midland League Premier Division victory against Tividale, in which he scored the first goal. He scored 15 goals from 25 appearances in the 2024–25 campaign. He played in the play-off final defeat to Shifnal Town.

On 24 June 2025, he joined Hanley Town, who had just been relegated to the Midland League Premier Division. Hanley were promoted as league champions at the end of the 2025–26 campaign. Bailey had scored 20 goals in 37 games before suffering a serious knee injury in early March.

== Style of play ==
Altrincham manager Phil Parkinson has described Bailey as "a modern-day centre-forward" who can "hold the ball up, run the channels and, most importantly, score goals".

== Personal life ==
His grandfather, Terry Bailey, played professionally for Port Vale in the 1970s and his father, Mark Bailey, played professionally for Rochdale, Lincoln City and Macclesfield Town.

== Career statistics ==
As of end of the 2024–25 season

Appearances and goals by club, season and competition
Club	Season	League			FA Cup		EFL Cup		Other		Total	
Club	Season	Division	Apps	Goals	Apps	Goals	Apps	Goals	Apps	Goals	Apps	Goals
Port Vale	2020–21	EFL League Two	0	0	0	0	0	0	0	0	0	0
Port Vale	2021–22	EFL League Two	1	0	0	0	1	0	0	0	2	0
Port Vale	Total		1	0	0	0	1	0	0	0	2	0
Newcastle Town (loan)	2021–22	Northern Premier League; Division One West	9	1	0	0	—		0	0	9	1
Altrincham	2022–23	National League	0	0	0	0	—		0	0	0	0
Hanley Town (loan)	2022–23	Northern Premier League; Division One West	7	2	0	0	—		0	0	7	2
Mossley (loan)	2022–23	Northern Premier League; Division One West	9	5	0	0	—		0	0	9	5
Mossley	2023–24	Northern Premier League; Division One West	17	1	3	1	—		2 (Note: one appearance in FA Trophy and one appearance in Manchester Premier Cup)	0	22	2
Mossley	Total		26	6	3	1	0	0	2	0	31	7
Clitheroe	2023–24	Northern Premier League; Division One West	3	0	0	0	—		0	0	3	0
Hednesford Town	2023–24	Northern Premier League; Division One West	10	1	0	0	—		2 (Note: one appearance in Birmingham Senior Cup and one appearance and one goal in Walsall Senior Cup)	1	12	2
Atherton Collieries	2024–25	Northern Premier League; Division One West	7	0	1	0	—		3 (Note: Two appearance in FA Trophy and one appearance and one goal in FA Challenge Cup)	1	11	1
City of Liverpool	2024–25	Northern Premier League; Division One West	7	0	0	0	—		0	0	7	0
1874 Northwich	2024–25	Midland League; Premier Division	22	13	0	0	—		3 (Note: Includes one appearance and two goals in Midland Football League Cup)	2	25	15
Hanley Town	2026–27	Northern Premier League; Division One West	0	0	0	0	—		0	0	0	0

== Honours ==
Hanley Town

- Midland League Premier Division: 2025–26
