= Dino Visser =

South African footballer

Personal information
- Full name: Dino Ben Visser
- Date of birth: 10 July 1989 (age 37)
- Place of birth: Polokwane, South Africa
- Height: 1.89 m (6 ft 2 in)
- Position: Goalkeeper

Team information
- Current team: Leek Town

Youth career
- 200?–2010: Platinum Stars

Senior career*
Years	Team	Apps	(Gls)
2010–2012	Platinum Stars	1	(0)
2012–2014	Bloemfontein Celtic	0	(0)
2013–2014	→ Black Leopards (loan)	16	(0)
2014–2016	Polokwane City	10	(0)
2016–2017	Santos	23	(0)
2017–2018	Platinum Stars	15	(0)
2018–2019	Cape Umoya United	20	(0)
2019–2020	Exeter City	0	(0)
2020	Crewe Alexandra	0	(0)
2020–2021	Port Vale	0	(0)
2022–2023	Hereford	22	(0)
2023–	Leek Town (Note: Statistics for the 2025–26 season not known.)	58	(0)
- * Club domestic league appearances and goals as of 19:18, 1 May 2026 (UTC)

Dino Ben Visser (born 10 July 1989) is a South African soccer player who plays as a goalkeeper for Northern Premier League Premier Division club Leek Town.

Visser began his career with Platinum Stars in his native country, South Africa, making his Premier Soccer League debut in March 2011. Visser was touted as one of the most exciting young prospects from South Africa for some time. Visser played for Bloemfontein Celtic, Black Leopards and Polokwane City and picked up a winners medal when Bloemfontein Celtic won the 2012 Telkom Knockout. He was the regular first-team goalkeeper at Santos during the 2016–17 season. Despite this, the club were relegated out of the National First Division. He returned to the top flight with former club Platinum Stars the next season as the regular first-choice goalkeeper. He remained as such when Platinum Stars was sold and renamed to Cape Umoya United.

In June 2019, Visser decided to move to England and eventually signed a short-term deal at Exeter City. After the expiration of his deal, he left the club to instead sign a short-term deal with Crewe Alexandra in March 2020. He signed a deal with Port Vale five months later but left the club after spending the second half of the 2020–21 season out injured. He signed with Hereford in September 2022 and was released at the end of the 2022–23 season before joining Leek Town in November 2023. He helped the club to win the Northern Premier League Division One West title in the 2023–24 campaign.

== Career ==
=== South Africa ===
Visser began his career with Platinum Stars, where head coach Steve Komphela described him and fellow youngster Allan Thomas as "good, up-and-coming young goalkeepers". In 2010, Visser featured for Platinum Stars in a friendly against England, as part of their preparations for the 2010 World Cup. Visser made his first-team debut under the stewardship of Owen Da Gama on 5 March 2011, keeping a clean sheet and the earning man of the match award in a 0–0 draw with SuperSport United at the Royal Bafokeng Stadium in the Premier Soccer League, with regular custodian Tapuwa Kapini suspended. This would prove to be his only appearance for the "Dikwena" however, as he refused to sign a new three-year deal with the club and instead chose to become a free agent in the summer. He moved on to Bloemfontein Celtic and was an unused substitute in the 2012 Telkom Knockout final, as Celtic beat Mamelodi Sundowns 3–0 at the Moses Mabhida Stadium.

He was loaned out to National First Division side Black Leopards for the 2013–14 season. He played 16 games to help Kosta Papić's "Lidoda Duvha" to record a second-place finish. However, they missed out on promotion as they went on to lose to Polokwane City in the play-offs; Visser entered the game as a 31st-minute replacement for Jacob Mokhasi, with the Leopards already two goals down, and his outstanding saves were too late to sway the game. Visser then signed with Polokwane City and started as the first choice in head coach Boebie Solomons' plans for the 2014–15 season as Botswana international Modiri Marumo was waiting on a work permit. He only played 11 games for the club after falling out with the club ownership structure, who came out to deny rumours that he had been released midway through the 2015–16 season.

Visser joined Santos in August 2016. He played 24 games during the 2016–17 season, though the "People's Team" would be relegated down to the SAFA Second Division in last place. He rejoined Platinum Stars in August 2017, signing a two-year deal, to compete with Mwenya Chibwe, Steven Hoffman and Mbongeni Mzimela for a place in Peter Butler's starting eleven. Stars finished second-bottom of the South African Premier Division and were relegated; Visser featured a total of 21 times, including playing in all the play-off matches. The Platinum Stars entity was sold and renamed Cape Umoya United, who were aiming for promotion under head coach Roger De Sá. He featured 24 times in the 2018–19 campaign. However, the "Spirited Ones" could only manage a tenth-place finish.

=== England ===
Following the expiration of his Cape Umoya United contract at the end of the 2018–19 National First Division season, Visser moved to England. He went on trial with Charlton Athletic in July 2019, but ultimately the "Addicks" instead opted to sign Ben Amos. In October, he joined EFL League Two club Exeter City on a short-term deal, who were missing Lewis Ward with a broken arm. Visser made his debut for the club in a 3–1 victory over West Ham United U21 at St James Park in the group stage of the EFL Trophy. In the following round, Visser kept a clean sheet against League One promotion contenders Oxford United, incredibly saving all three of Oxford's penalties in the ensuing penalty shoot-out – a performance which earned him the tournament's 'Player of the Round' award. Following on from the expiration of Visser's short-term contract and a second injury to Jonny Maxted, Visser was offered the chance to return to the "Grecians" in February; however, he rejected this, and the following month joined EFL League Two rivals Crewe Alexandra and promotion favourites on a short-term deal to the end of the 2019–20 season.

He signed for League Two club Port Vale on 27 August 2020 after impressing manager John Askey on trial, who hoped he would challenge established number one Scott Brown for a first-team place. He made his debut against Tranmere Rovers at Vale Park on 8 September, keeping a clean sheet and then saving three penalties in the shoot-out to secure two points for the "Valiants" in the group stages of the EFL Trophy. However, he was deregistered at the end of the January transfer window after he was sidelined with a hamstring injury. Both Brown and Visser were released at the end of the 2020–21 season by new manager Darrell Clarke.

On 23 September 2022, Visser signed for National League North club Hereford following an injury to on-loan goalkeeper Harvey Wiles-Richards. He became the club's first-choice goalkeeper after Christmas. He made 22 appearances in all competitions before being released by new manager Paul Caddis at the end of the 2022–23 season. On 16 November 2023, after almost seven months without a club, Visser joined Northern Premier League Division One West club Leek Town. Town set a club record 798 minutes without conceding a goal, with Visser playing 708 of those minutes. Leek were crowned Northern Premier League Division One West champions at the end of the 2023–24 season. He made 24 appearances games during the campaign, including an appearance in the Staffordshire Senior Cup final where Leek lost 1–0 to Rushall Olympic. He played 41 games of the 2024–25 campaign. He made his 100th club appearance in March 2026.

== Career statistics ==
As of match played 29 March 2025

Appearances and goals by club, season and competition
Club	Season	League			National cup (Note: Includes Nedbank Cup, FA Cup)		League cup (Note: Includes Carling Knockout Cup, EFL Cup)		Other		Total	
Club	Season	Division	Apps	Goals	Apps	Goals	Apps	Goals	Apps	Goals	Apps	Goals
Platinum Stars	2010–11	South African Premier Division	1	0	0	0	0	0	0	0	1	0
Bloemfontein Celtic	2012–13	South African Premier Division	0	0	0	0	0	0	0	0	0	0
Black Leopards (loan)	2013–14	National First Division	16	0	1	0	0	0	1 (Note: Appearance(s) in the play-offs.)	0	18	0
Polokwane City	2014–15	South African Premier Division	10	0	0	0	1	0	0	0	11	0
Santos	2016–17	National First Division	23	0	1	0	0	0	0	0	24	0
Platinum Stars	2017–18	South African Premier Division	15	0	0	0	2	0	4	0	21	0
Cape Umoya United	2018–19	National First Division	20	0	4	0	0	0	0	0	24	0
Exeter City	2019–20	EFL League Two	0	0	0	0	0	0	2 (Note: Appearance(s) in the EFL Trophy.)	0	2	0
Crewe Alexandra	2019–20	EFL League Two	0	0	0	0	0	0	0	0	0	0
Port Vale	2020–21	EFL League Two	0	0	0	0	1	0	5	0	6	0
Hereford	2022–23	National League North	22	0	0	0	—		0	0	22	0
Leek Town	2023–24	Northern Premier League; Division One West	22	0	—		—		2 (Note: Appearance(s) in the Staffordshire Senior Cup.)	0	24	0
Leek Town	2024–25	Northern Premier League; Premier Division	36	0	2	0	0	0	3 (Note: 1 appearance in the FA Trophy and 2 appearances in the Staffordshire Senior Cup.)	0	41	0
Leek Town	2025–26	Northern Premier League; Premier Division										
Leek Town	2026–27	Northern Premier League; Premier Division	0	0	0	0	0	0	0	0	0	0
Leek Town	Total		58	0	2	0	0	0	5	0	65	0
Career total			165	0	8	0	4	0	17	0	194	0

== Honours ==
Bloemfontein Celtic

- Telkom Knockout: 2012

Leek Town

- Northern Premier League Division One West: 2023–24
- Staffordshire Senior Cup runner-up: 2024
