= Ryan Campbell-Gordon =

English footballer

Personal information
- Full name: Ryan Joseph Campbell-Gordon
- Date of birth: 2 May 2001 (age 25)
- Place of birth: Nottingham, England
- Height: 5 ft 10 in (1.78 m)
- Position: Left-back

Team information
- Current team: Long Eaton United

Youth career
- 2017–2019: Port Vale

Senior career*
Years	Team	Apps	(Gls)
2019–2021	Port Vale	1	(0)
2019	→ Ilkeston Town (loan)	10	(1)
2020	→ Kidsgrove Athletic (loan)		
2020	→ Hednesford Town (loan)	3	(0)
2020	→ Gainsborough Trinity (loan)	2	(0)
2021–2022	Hanley Town	26	(2)
2023–	Long Eaton United		
- * Club domestic league appearances and goals as of 11:26, 26 April 2026 (UTC)

Ryan Joseph Campbell-Gordon (born 2 May 2001) is an English semi-professional footballer who plays as a left-back for Northern Premier League Division One Midlands club Long Eaton United.

Campbell-Gordon made his debut in the English Football League for Port Vale in August 2019. He had loan spells at Ilkeston Town, Kidsgrove Athletic, Hednesford Town and Gainsborough Trinity, before joining Hanley Town after being released in summer 2021. He helped Hanley to win the Midland League Premier Division title at the end of the 2021–22 season. He joined Long Eaton United in September 2023.

== Career ==
=== Port Vale ===
Campbell-Gordon came through the Port Vale youth team and won the club's Youth Team Player of the Year award for the 2018–19 season. He signed his first professional contract with the club in May 2019, tying him with the "Valiants" until summer 2021. The next month he was highlighted as an 'outstanding candidate' by the League Football Education, as he "met with some challenging situations in the local community" and spent six months of his childhood without a school before being accepted into the Ormiston Horizon Academy in Chell and going on to achieve a BTEC Level 3 Diploma. He made his debut in senior football on 24 August 2019, coming on as a 78th-minute substitute for David Worrall in a 5–2 defeat at Grimsby Town. On 14 September, he joined Northern Premier League Division One South East side Ilkeston Town on a one-month loan. On 29 February 2020, he returned to the Northern Premier League Division One South East on loan at Kidsgrove Athletic.

In September 2020, he joined Hednesford Town on a one-month loan deal. He made three Southern League Premier Division Central appearances for the "Pitmen". Also, he played a game in the qualification rounds of the FA Cup. On 27 October, he joined Northern Premier League Premier Division side Gainsborough Trinity on loan. He played three games for the "Holy Blues" before the Northern Premier League was suspended due to restrictions put in place because of the COVID-19 pandemic in England. He did not feature throughout the 2020–21 season and was released by new manager Darrell Clarke in May 2021.

=== non-League ===
On 15 June 2021, Campbell-Gordon he was revealed to be signing for Midland League Premier Division club Hanley Town; he shared the same agent with the manager Carl Dickinson and had been coached by assistant manager Dave Kevan at Port Vale. Hanley won promotion as champions of the Midland League Premier Division at the end of the 2021–22 season.

He joined Southern League Premier Division Central club Long Eaton United on 22 September 2023. He featured 19 times in the 2023–24 relegation campaign. He signed a contract extension in October 2024 that would keep him at the club until the summer of 2026 as manager Brad Munn felt Campbell-Gordon was a "a true example to all players, young and old". He made 42 appearances in the 2024–25 campaign, including in the play-off semi-final defeat at Corby Town. He was named as the club's Supporters Player of the Season.

== Style of play ==
Campbell-Gordon was described by Port Vale youth team coach Mick Ede as "a modern day full back", boasting good athletic and attacking abilities.

== Career statistics ==
As of end of the 2025–26 season

Appearances and goals by club, season and competition
Club	Season	League			FA Cup		EFL Cup		Other		Total	
Club	Season	Division	Apps	Goals	Apps	Goals	Apps	Goals	Apps	Goals	Apps	Goals
Port Vale	2019–20	League Two	1	0	0	0	0	0	1 (Note: Appearance(s) in the EFL Trophy.)	0	2	0
Port Vale	2020–21	League Two	0	0	0	0	0	0	0	0	0	0
Port Vale	Total		1	0	0	0	0	0	1	0	2	0
Ilkeston Town (loan)	2019–20	Northern Premier League; Division One South East	10	1	0	0	—		1 (Note: Appearance(s) in the Derbyshire Senior Cup.)	0	11	1
Hednesford Town (loan)	2020–21	Southern League; Premier Division Central	3	0	1	0	—		0	0	4	0
Gainsborough Trinity (loan)	2020–21	Northern Premier League; Premier Division	2	0	0	0	—		1 (Note: Appearance(s) in the FA Trophy)	0	3	0
Hanley Town	2021–22	Midland League Premier Division	26	2	7	0	—		2 (Note: Two appearances in FA Vase)	0	35	2
Long Eaton United	2023–24	Southern League; Premier Division Central	18	0	0	0	—		1	0	19	0
Long Eaton United	2024–25	Northern Premier League; Division One Midlands	36	0	2	0	—		4 (Note: 2 appearances in the FA Trophy, 1 appearance in the Derbyshire Senior Cup and 1 appearance in the play-offs)	0	42	0
Long Eaton United	2025–26 (Note: Statistics for the 2025–26 season not known.)	Northern Premier League; Division One Midlands										
Long Eaton United	2026–27	Northern Premier League; Division One Midlands	0	0	0	0	—		0	0	0	0

== Honours ==
Hanley Town

- Midland League Premier Division: 2021–22
