= 2020–21 Port Vale F.C. season =

Port Vale
2020–21 season
- Owner: Synsol Holdings Limited
- Chairperson: Carol Shanahan
- Manager: John Askey (until 4 January); Danny Pugh (caretaker 4 January – 15 February); Darrell Clarke (from 15 February)
- Stadium: Vale Park
- League Two: 13th (60 points)
- FA Cup: First Round (eliminated by King's Lynn Town)
- EFL Cup: Second Round (eliminated by Fleetwood Town)
- EFL Trophy: Third Round (eliminated by Sunderland)
- Player of the Year: Tom Conlon
- Top goalscorer: League: Devante Rodney (11); All: Devante Rodney (12)
- Average home league attendance: 0 (behind closed doors)
- Biggest win: 5–1 vs. Southend United, 30 January 2021
- Biggest defeat: 0–4 vs. Mansfield Town, 2 January 2021
Home colours	Away colours	Third colours

The 2020–21 season was Port Vale's 109th season in the English Football League and fourth consecutive season in EFL League Two. Though no honours were won on the pitch, Port Vale was named as Community Club of the Year at the 2021 EFL Awards for their work helping the local area during the COVID-19 pandemic.

Going into his second full season as the club's manager, John Askey kept largely the same squad that finished just outside the play-offs in 2019–20, signing just seven players before the season kicked off in September. Fans were not allowed to attend matches due to the ongoing COVID-19 pandemic in the United Kingdom. Vale exited the EFL Cup in the second round but were second in the league by the end of September. Four wins and three defeats in October in seven games saw them maintain a play-off place. However, they lost six matches in November, causing them to exit the FA Cup in the first round to non-League King's Lynn Town and drop firmly into mid-table in the league. Pressure built over the Christmas period as Vale ended the year 16th in the table, and Askey left the club on 4 January, two days after a 4–0 defeat to Mansfield Town. Danny Pugh spent the rest of the month as caretaker manager, overseeing comprehensive victories over Grimsby Town and Southend United as well as an exit from the EFL Trophy and two defeats in games he was unable to attend due to him testing positive for COVID-19.

David Flitcroft was appointed as the club's first ever director of football in February and Darrell Clarke was signed from Walsall as the club's new manager. It took Clarke eight games to get his first win as Vale manager. Still, this was followed by another two consecutive victories, which left Vale nine points clear of the relegation zone going into April. The winning run continued, and 16 out of a possible 18 points were secured in April, with just a single goal conceded. Clarke released all 15-out-of-contract players at the end of the season and placed a further three contracted players on the transfer-list.

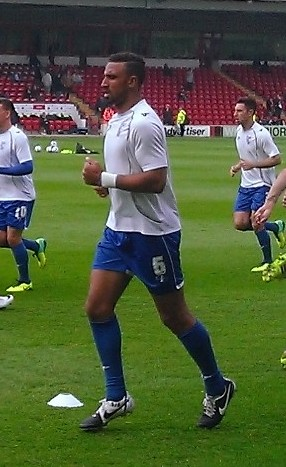
Club captain Leon Legge.

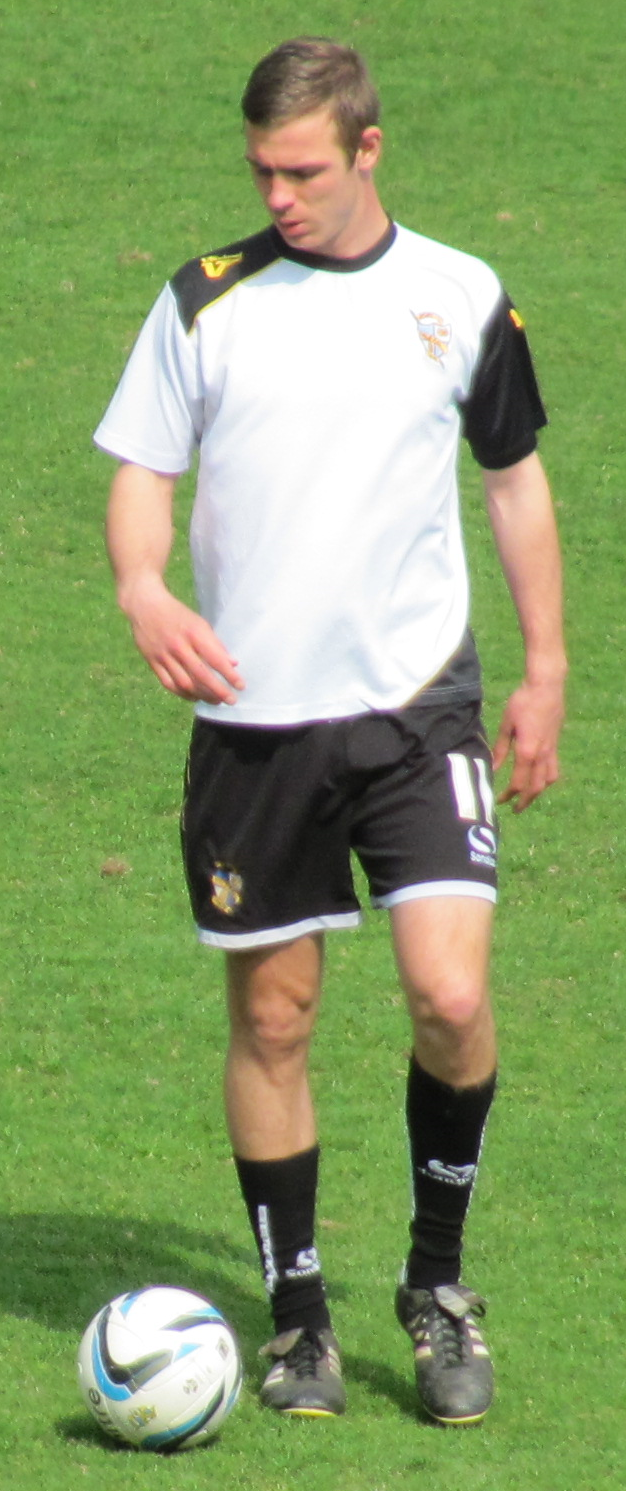
Tom Pope left the club after nine seasons in two spells.

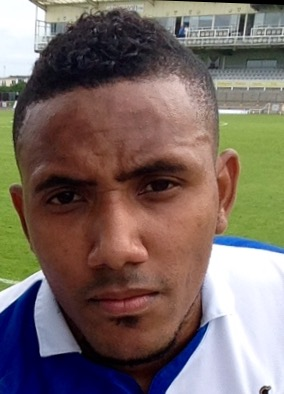
Cristian Montaño made 34 appearances.

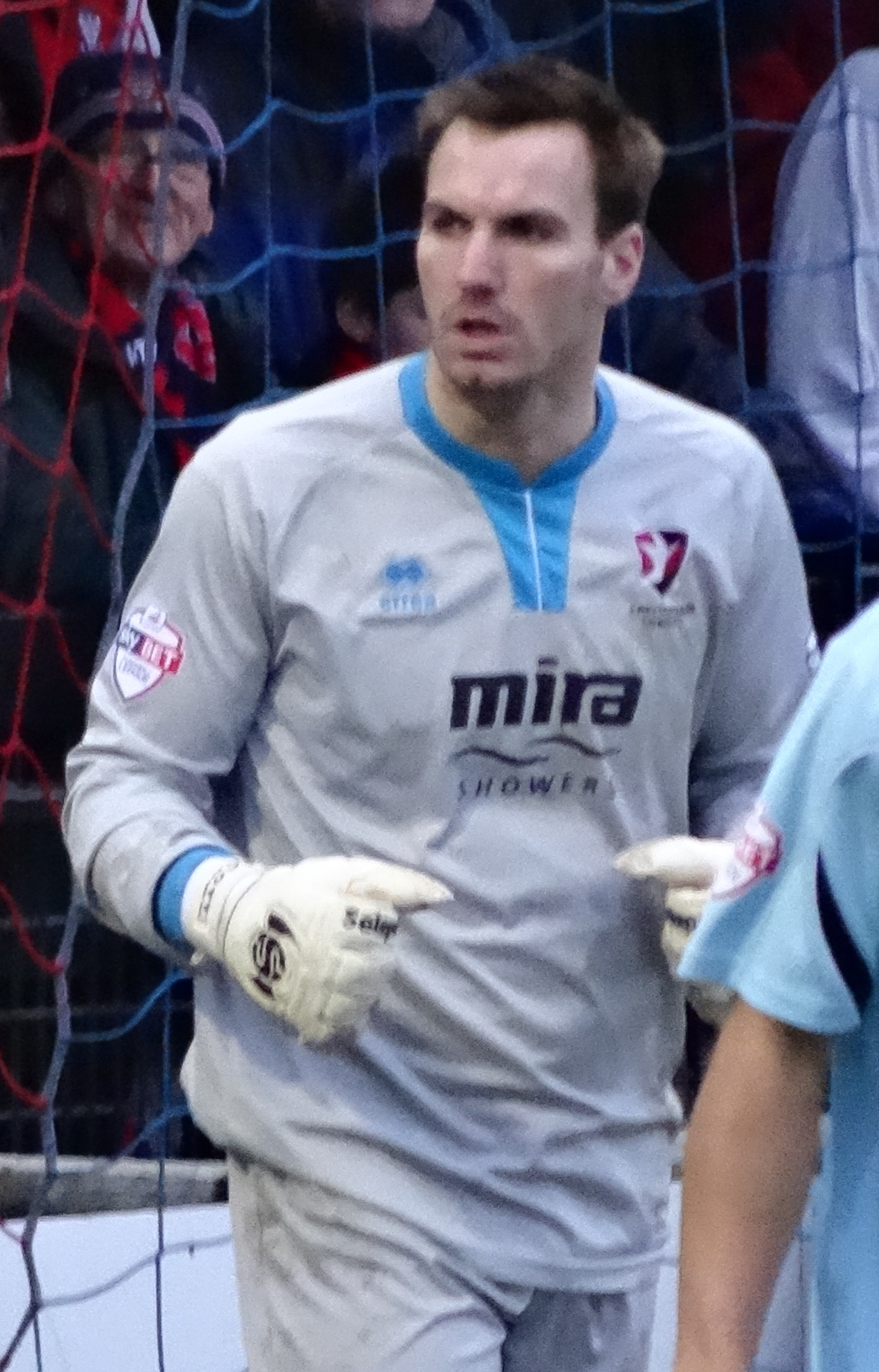
Goalkeeper Scott Brown played all 46 league games.

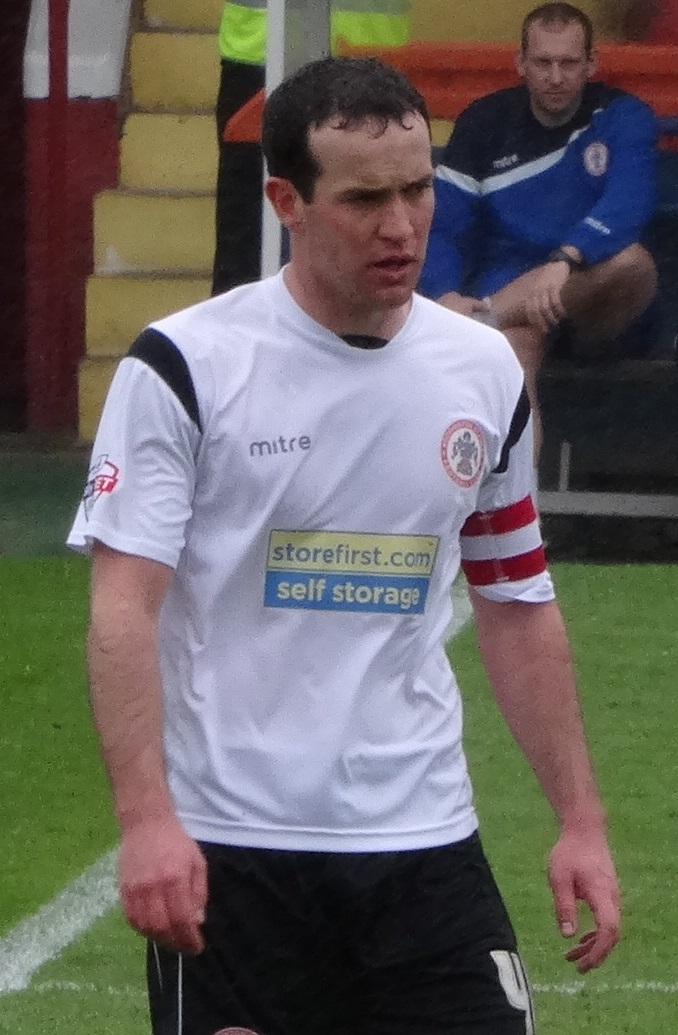
Luke Joyce missed just five league games

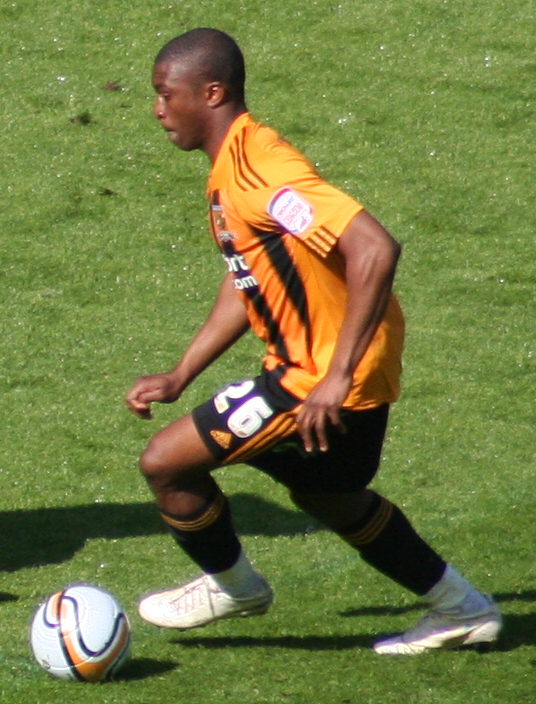
David Amoo missed parts of the season due to injuries.

== Overview ==
=== EFL League Two ===
On 7 July 2020, manager John Askey made his first summer signing in 22-year-old striker Devante Rodney, who had been released by Salford City. Two weeks later he brought in versatile right-back Zak Mills, who had been released by Oldham Athletic, in order to provide competition for James Gibbons. Tom Pope began the season with a six match ban after a Twitter post he made in January was judged to have amounted to Antisemitic canard. Askey meanwhile continued to strengthen the squad, bringing in midfielder Danny Whitehead, who had also played under Askey at Macclesfield Town and had just been released from Salford City. The club kit was revealed later that week, the unique “V” patterned home strip having partly designed by Robbie Williams, club owner Carol Shanahan and her son Patrick. Askey looked at a number of players on trial during pre-season, including free agents Dino Visser, Harvey Bradbury, Rhys Lovett, Ethan Beckford and David Fitzpatrick, as well as Nottingham Forest academy player Kieran Hayes. However, the next signing, a fourth and final striker, was Theo Robinson, who had played for the club in 2016. He also signed trialist left-back David Fitzpatrick, another of his former charges at Macclesfield, on a one-year deal. He completed the squad with goalkeeper Dino Visser, who "did everything asked of him" in his trial. However, winger Rhys Browne left the club by mutual consent, citing family reasons; Askey said that "it was a shame because he was doing well". Askey looked to replace him quickly by bringing in Harry McKirdy (free agent) and Ryan McLean (Newcastle Town) on trial and went on to sign McKirdy to a one-year deal.

Vale opened the season with a convincing 2–0 home win over Crawley Town on 12 September, Mark Cullen scoring both of the goals; this extended the club's record of not losing a league opening fixture since 2004. The following week they travelled to St James Park, home of the previous season's play-off finalists, and picked up another 2–0 win, with Tom Conlon scoring a goal and providing the assist for Rodney's first goal for the club. Port Vale met Harrogate Town in a league fixture for the first time on 29 September and the two teams played out a 0–0 draw in a hard-fought game. Askey was nominated for the EFL League Two Manager of the Month award as the team had secured seven points from nine without conceding a goal.

Going into October, Vale were beaten 1–0 at Morecambe after Shaun Brisley gave away a soft penalty with 14 minutes left to play; after the game opposition manager Derek Adams stated that the gameplan had been to stop Luke Joyce getting on the ball and to play on the counterattack. With right-back James Gibbons sidelined with a long-term injury, Askey brought in Leicester City full-back Mitch Clark for his third loan spell at the club. He started at home to Carlisle United on 10 October, a game in which Vale lost 1–0 after Rodney missed a free header and Pope missed a penalty. They got back to winning ways at home to Paul Scholes's Salford City; Scott Brown saved a penalty and Cristian Montaño went on to score the game's only goal with four minutes left to play. However, they fell to a 3–1 defeat at league leaders Cambridge United three days later, with Paul Mullin claiming a hat-trick. A trip to struggling Oldham Athletic followed and Vale claimed all three points from Boundary Park thanks to goals from Nathan Smith and Mitch Clark. They went on to pick up back-to-back wins after coming from a goal down to claim a 2–1 home victory over Cheltenham Town. A brace from Pope on Halloween saw the Vale win at bottom-placed Southend United.

On 14 November, Vale fell to a 4–3 home defeat to Tranmere Rovers; they had been leading 2–0 at half-time but the game changed in the away side's favour after Joyce was sent off on 52 minutes. The game had many talking points besides the sending off, including a goal disallowed for either side, a penalty for either side and the way Vale reacted to going a man down. Three days later Vale would lose 1–0 to Scunthorpe United thanks to a superb strike from Abo Eisa. A third consecutive league defeat followed as Vale failed to hold on to a 0–0 draw at league leaders Newport County after Leon Legge was sent off for picking up two yellow cards; Newport's goal was scored six minutes into injury-time by 41-year-old Kevin Ellison. Second-from-bottom Stevenage seemed like the perfect place to end the losing run, but Vale were beaten 2–1. They finished off the month by losing 3–2 at home to Leyton Orient, conceding the winning goal five minutes from time.

The trip to Bolton Wanderers on 5 December saw an away side on a run of five defeats visit a side on a six-game winning spell. Vale defied the odds to record a 6–3 victory in a game with nine different goalscorers, becoming the first away side to score six goals at the University of Bolton Stadium. The next week Vale outperformed Colchester United but only held on to the lead for seven minutes after allowing the away side to equalise after a lapse in defensive concentration. Another 1–1 home draw with a play-off team followed this time Forest Green Rovers equalising just seven minutes after Vale opened the scoring with an own goal. The team's trip to Walsall's Bescot Stadium started excellently as they led 2–0 at half-time; however, the home side made four changes during the break and equalised after 11 minutes and despite Rodney putting Vale back in front, Walsall went on to win the game 4–3 after Jake Scrimshaw and Dan Scarr completed second half braces. Barrow then inflicted a Boxing day defeat on the side at Vale Park, with former loanee Scott Quigley opening the scoring thanks to an assist from former Vale captain Antony Kay; after the match, Askey admitted that "the wheels have just fallen off" the club's promotion campaign as they slipped to 17th in the table. He named three academy players on the bench at Valley Parade on 29 December, as Vale saw out 2020 with a 0–0 draw with Bradford City.

The new year began with a 4–0 defeat at Mansfield Town thanks to a Jordan Bowery hat-trick and Legge being sent off for the second time of the season; speaking in his post-match interview, Askey alluded to "a lot of strange happenings going", saying that "it’s not a level playing field at the moment". This proved to be Askey's last game in charge and he left the club on 4 January, with coach Danny Pugh stepping in as caretaker manager. Pugh made Conlon the new club captain. Pugh selected a 4–4–2 formation for first game in charge, a 3–0 home win over Grimsby Town that proved to be a stark contrast to their defeat seven days previously. The club then signed Jake Taylor, a 22-year-old midfielder who had impressed on loan from Nottingham Forest the previous season, to a three-and-a-half-year deal. With Pope ruled out injured for the rest of the season, the club also brought in striker Kurtis Guthrie after he secured his release from Bradford City. In order to comply with EFL squad limit rules the club deregistered Harry McKirdy and Theo Robinson so as to make room for the two new signings. Guthrie started on the bench at Forest Green Rovers on 16 January, which ended as a 1–1 draw following a late equalising goal from Rodney. However, two days later, Pugh had to start self-isolation after testing positive for COVID-19; his assistants – Frank Sinclair, Billy Paynter and Anthony Griffith took over first-team duties in his absence. They oversaw a 3–1 defeat to Walsall in which Brown played poorly and allowed a weak back-pass to bobble over his foot and into the back of the net. The bad run continued at Scunthorpe, as poor defending allowed a brace from Ryan Loft to condemn Vale to a 2–0 loss; stand-in manager Frank Sinclair said that "it wasn’t good enough, especially the first half". Pugh returned to the touchline in time to oversee a 5–1 victory over bottom-club Southend United, who Pope described as "the worst professional side I have ever seen". On transfer deadline day the club signed 19-year-old centre-back Mustapha Olagunju on loan from Huddersfield Town and 20-year-old striker Will Swan on loan from Nottingham Forest.

The search for a new manager continued into February, with David Flitcroft and John McGreal seen as the two front-runners for the position. The team went on to lose 3–1 at Tranmere, with James Vaughan scoring a brace. Flitcroft was appointed as the club's first-ever director of football on 8 February. Seven days later Darrell Clarke was announced as the club's new manager, with Walsall being paid a compensation fee. His first match in charge was a 1–1 draw at Leyton Orient, in which he was pleased with his team's effort. His first home match was a goalless draw with Stevenage, after which he commented that "Effort and commitment - excellent. But nowhere near good enough for me on the quality". The league leaders, Cambridge, left Burslem with three points after an excellent late strike from Liam O'Neil.

On 2 March, Vale were beaten 1–0 at Salford, and lost both Gibbons and Montaño to hamstring injuries. A trip to league leaders Cheltenham Town four days later saw the team two goals down within the opening 20 minutes, with Brown – who had publicly criticised many of his teammates in the week – having scored an own goal; Vale would lose the game 3–2 despite Will Swan and Alex Hurst scoring their first Football League goals in the late stages. Vale dominated at home to Oldham Athletic on 9 March, but failed to convert any of their chances as the game ended 0–0, with Clarke bemoaning his side's lack of ruthlessness and musing that "we led the horse to a lot of water there didn't we?". After the game Clarke announced that experienced coach Andy Crosby had been added to the staff, whilst there would be a ban on players speaking to the media until the end of the campaign. However, the losing run continued as Bolton Wanderers came away from Vale Park with a 1–0 win, after which Clarke encouraged players who were unwilling to fight for the club to tell him so as "we look them in the eye sometimes and just get the feeling they are not really fancying this". Clarke finally got his first win as Port Vale manager on 16 March as Conlon and Rodney fired Vale to a 2–1 home win over Newport County, and after the match said "the players tonight deserve all the plaudits". Rodney then went on to score the only goal of the game at Colchester to put the Vale ten points clear of the relegation zone. A 3–1 victory at Crawley Town all but guaranteed safety from relegation and earned the team praise from opposition manager John Yems. Following the match it was confirmed that Zak Mills missed the rest of the season due to injury, and the club gained special dispensation from the EFL to re-register Harry McKirdy to the 22-man squad in his place.

Robinson ended his 19-game-long goal drought two minutes into the home game with Exeter City on 2 April, which ended up giving the Vale a 1–0 victory that Clarke dedicated to the memory of recently deceased former defender Lee Collins. Rebecca Welch became the first woman to be appointed to referee an EFL fixture for Vale's trip to Harrogate Town on 5 April, and she oversaw a fifth consecutive win for the away side with Guthrie scoring his first goal in 15 games for the club to wrap up a 2–0 win. A 1–0 home victory over play-off hopefuls Morecambe extended the winning run to six games; the match was halted for 30 minutes in the first half due to heavy snowfall. On 13 April, Manny Oyeleke, whose contract was due to expire in the summer, was allowed to leave the club to join National League play-off chasing Chesterfield. The six-game winning run – the club's longest winning streak since March 1996 – came to an end with a goalless draw at play-off hopefuls Carlisle United. A brace from Conlon, including a wonder strike to open the scoring, was enough to win 2–0 at Barrow. A 2–1 win over Bradford City kept the unbeaten run going, though Clayton Donaldson's consolation goal brought Vale's five match clean sheet streak to an end.

Vale's nine-game unbeaten run came to an end with a 1–0 defeat at already-relegated Grimsby Town after Matt Green capitalised on an under-hit back-pass from Joyce; Montaño was sent off late in the game after receiving a second yellow card for dissent. The season came to an end with a 3–0 defeat to Mansfield Town as a number of changes were made to the starting eleven, after which Clarke commented that "I can’t wait to get rid of the deadwood if I am honest". Two days later, Clarke released all 15 out of contract players: Brisley, Brown, Ryan Campbell-Gordon, Adam Crookes, Cullen, Fitzpatrick, Guthrie, Joyce, McKirdy, Mills, Montaño, Pope, Scott, Daniel Trickett-Smith and Visser. He also transfer-listed Robinson, Whitehead and Scott Burgess.

=== Finances ===
The season began with no fans allowed into any grounds across the English Football League due to the ongoing COVID-19 pandemic in England, with initial plans to see crowds return to stadiums in October. However, these plans were halted due to a rise in cases nationally in September. Port Vale fans bought around 4,000 season tickets regardless, the same as during the previous season, and shirt sales were also at a record high; chairperson Carol Shanahan said that "the club are overwhelmed and beyond grateful in the trust and support we have been shown by Port Vale fans". By 31 March, the club had sold 11,000 replica shirts – 6,000 of which were black away kit – as compared to 3,800 sales the previous season. The club was given the Community Club of the Year (Overall & Midlands) awards at the 2021 EFL Awards for "a staggering 300,000 food parcels and 6,000 phone calls delivered to those in need during the pandemic", whilst club president and former manager John Rudge was given the Contribution to League football award. The club earned £270,983 of net revenue from the EFL's iFollow service. The Shanahan's had to invest over £1 million into the club to make up for the shortfall from playing behind closed doors.

=== Cup competitions ===
Port Vale were drawn at home to King's Lynn Town (National League) in the first round of the FA Cup, the first-ever meeting between the two clubs. Vale lost the game 1–0 as King's Lynn claimed their first clean sheet of the season.

The first round draw of the EFL Cup was made by Paul Merson and set Port Vale away at Scunthorpe United (League Two). Vale won the tie with Zac Mills and Theo Robinson scoring debut goals in a 2–1 win. The draw for both the second and third rounds were confirmed simultaneously, and guaranteed the club a home tie with Everton (Premier League) or Salford City (League Two) if they managed first to overcome Fleetwood Town (League One). Askey made ten changes against Fleetwood and was encouraged by his team's performance in a 2–1 defeat.

The regional group stage draw for the EFL Trophy placed Port Vale in a group with Tranmere Rovers (League Two), Wigan Athletic (League One) and Liverpool under-21s. They drew their home fixture with Tranmere Rovers 0–0 and Visser went on to save three penalties in the shoot-out to secure two points for the Vale. They effectively booked their place into the next round with a 3–1 victory at Wigan Athletic, in which Robinson scored a brace. Vale finished top of the group with a 4–2 home win over Liverpool U21. They then advanced into the third round with a 2–1 win over Wolverhampton Wanderers U21. In the third round, an away tie at League One giants Sunderland proved too much for a Vale side with seven changes from their last league fixture, as the "Black Cats" claimed a 2–0 victory; it was later revealed that Pope broke his arm with 19 minutes left to play and he carried on playing until the full-time whistle.

== Results ==
=== Pre-season ===
15 August 2020 Friendly	Port Vale	1–2	Blackpool	Burslem
15:00 BST	Burgess 51'	Report	Kaikai 43'; Anderson 54'	Stadium: Vale Park; Attendance: 0

18 August 2020 Friendly	Fleetwood Town	1–2	Port Vale	Thornton-Cleveleys
15:00 BST	Saunders 33'	Report	Conlon 10'; Browne 35' (pen.)	Stadium: Poolfoot Farm; Attendance: 0 Referee: Simon Mather

26 August 2020 Friendly	Nottingham Forest	1–2	Port Vale	Loughborough
15:00 BST	Mighten	Report	og. Robinson	Stadium: Loughborough University; Attendance: 0

29 August 2020 Friendly	Port Vale	2–1	Rochdale	Burslem
15:00 BST	Conlon 45' (pen.), 56' (pen.)	Report	Morley 65' (pen.)	Stadium: Vale Park; Attendance: 0 Referee: Rob Lewis

=== EFL League Two ===
==== League table ====
Pos	Team	Pld	W	D	L	GF	GA	GD	Pts
9	Exeter City	46	18	16	12	71	50	+21	70
10	Carlisle United	46	18	12	16	60	51	+9	66
11	Leyton Orient	46	17	10	19	53	55	−2	61
12	Crawley Town	46	16	13	17	56	62	−6	61
13	Port Vale	46	17	9	20	57	57	0	60
14	Stevenage	46	14	18	14	41	41	0	60
15	Bradford City	46	16	11	19	48	53	−5	59
16	Mansfield Town	46	13	19	14	57	55	+2	58
17	Harrogate Town	46	16	9	21	52	61	−9	57

Updated to match(es) played on 31 May 2021. Source: EFL Official Website
Rules for classification: 1) Points; 2) Goal difference; 3) Number of goals scored; 4) Head-to-head results; 5) Wins; 6) Away goals; 7) Penalty points (sec 9.5); 8) 12-point sending off offences

==== Results by matchday ====
Matchday	1	2	3	4	5	6	7	8	9	10	11	12	13	14	15	16	17	18	19	20	21	22	23	24	25	26	27	28	29	30	31	32	33	34	35	36	37	38	39	40	41	42	43	44	45	46
Ground	H	A	H	A	H	H	A	A	H	A	H	H	A	A	H	A	H	H	A	H	A	A	H	A	H	A	H	A	A	H	H	A	A	H	H	H	A	A	H	A	H	A	A	H	A	H
Result	W	W	D	L	L	W	L	W	W	W	L	L	L	L	L	W	D	D	L	L	D	L	W	D	L	L	W	L	D	D	L	L	L	D	L	W	W	W	W	W	W	D	W	W	L	L
Position	3	2	2	5	10	8	13	10	7	5	8	8	9	11	13	11	14	13	16	17	16	17	13	14	16	16	15	16	19	18	20	21	21	21	21	20	19	18	16	15	13	14	14	12	13	13
Points	3	6	7	7	7	10	10	13	16	19	19	19	19	19	19	22	23	24	24	24	25	25	28	29	29	29	32	32	33	34	34	34	34	35	35	38	41	44	47	50	53	54	57	60	60	60

Updated to match(es) played on 5 April 2021. Source: 11v11 for league tables and fixtures
A = Away; H = Home; W = Win; D = Draw; L = Loss

==== Matches ====
Win Draw Loss

12 September 2020 1	Port Vale	2–0	Crawley Town	Burslem
15:00 BST	Cullen 39', 66'	Report		Stadium: Vale Park; Attendance: 0 Referee: Sam Allison; Assistant referees: Gary Hilton, Christopher Kidd; Fourth official: Joe Simpson

19 September 2020 2	Exeter City	0–2	Port Vale	Exeter
15:00 BST		Report	Conlon 21'; Rodney 72'	Stadium: St James Park; Attendance: 0 Referee: Sam Purkiss; Assistant referees: Samuel Ogles, Michael Begley; Fourth official: Garry Maskell

26 September 2020 3	Port Vale	0–0	Harrogate Town	Burslem
15:00 BST		Report		Stadium: Vale Park; Attendance: 0 Referee: Ben Toner; Assistant referees: Andy Hendley, Ian Smedley, Kenwyn Hughes; Fourth official: Ollie Williams

3 October 2020 4	Morecambe	1–0	Port Vale	Morecambe
15:00 BST	Phillips 76' (pen.)	Report		Stadium: Globe Arena; Attendance: 0 Referee: Bobby Madley; Assistant referees: Geoffrey Liddle, Barry Gordon; Fourth official: Peter Gooch

10 October 2020 5	Port Vale	0–1	Carlisle United	Burslem
15:00 BST		Report	Mellish 55'	Stadium: Vale Park; Attendance: 0 Referee: James Bell; Assistant referees: Darren Wilding, Steven Plane; Fourth official: Oliver Bickle

17 October 2020 6	Port Vale	1–0	Salford City	Burslem
15:00 BST	Montaño 86'			Stadium: Vale Park; Attendance: 0 Referee: James Adcock; Assistant referees: Marvyn Amphlett, Danny Gratton; Fourth official: Anthony Moore

20 October 2020 7	Cambridge United	3–1	Port Vale	Cambridge
19:45 BST	Mullin 3' (pen.), 51', 90+5'	Report	Robinson 18' (pen.)	Stadium: Abbey Stadium; Attendance: 0 Referee: Trevor Kettle; Assistant referees: Leigh Crowhurst, Stephen Brown; Fourth official: Aaron Farmer

24 October 2020 8	Oldham Athletic	1–2	Port Vale	Oldham
15:00 BST	Dearnley 50'	Report	Smith 12'; Clark 39'	Stadium: Boundary Park; Attendance: 0 Referee: Martin Coy; Assistant referees: Paul Newhouse, Gary Hilton; Fourth official: Anthony Backhouse

27 October 2020 9	Port Vale	2–1	Cheltenham Town	Burslem
19:45 GMT	Legge 52'; Worrall 68'	Report	Williams 48'	Stadium: Vale Park; Attendance: 0 Referee: Dean Whitestone; Assistant referees: Mark Russell, Craig Taylor; Fourth official: Sam Lewis

31 October 2020 10	Southend United	0–2	Port Vale	Southend-on-Sea
15:00 GMT		Report	Pope 48', 64'	Stadium: Roots Hall; Attendance: 0 Referee: Tom Nield; Assistant referees: Darren Blunden, Alasdair Ross; Fourth official: Stuart Butler

14 November 2020 11	Port Vale	3–4	Tranmere Rovers	Burslem
19:45 GMT	Conlon 16' (pen.); Amoo 24'; Rodney 75'	Report	Vaughan 58', 71' (pen.); Woolery 90+3'; Morris 90+6'	Stadium: Vale Park; Attendance: 0 Referee: Carl Brook; Assistant referees: Matthew Smith, Kevin Howick; Fourth official: Paul Graham

17 November 2020 12	Port Vale	0–1	Scunthorpe United	Burslem
19:00 GMT		Report	Eisa 28'	Stadium: Vale Park; Attendance: 0 Referee: Leigh Doughty; Assistant referees: Paul Hodskinson, Mark Dwyer; Fourth official: Matthew Jones

21 November 2020 13	Newport County	1–0	Port Vale	Newport, Wales
15:00 GMT	Ellison 90+6'	Report		Stadium: Rodney Parade; Attendance: 0 Referee: Alan Young; Assistant referees: Simon Shaw, Steven Plane; Fourth official: John Flynn

24 November 2020 14	Stevenage	2–1	Port Vale	Stevenage
19:45 GMT	Oteh 10'; Newton 53'	Report	Rodney 81'	Stadium: Broadhall Way; Attendance: 0 Referee: Paul Howard; Assistant referees: Louis Marks, Darren Wilding; Fourth official: Paul Evans

28 November 2020 15	Port Vale	2–3	Leyton Orient	Burslem
13:00 GMT	Legge 8'; Montaño 76'	Report	Johnson 11'; Wilkinson 31'; Brophy 85'	Stadium: Vale Park; Attendance: 0 Referee: Peter Wright; Assistant referees: Grant Taylor, Andrew Dallison; Fourth official: Sam Barrott

5 December 2020 16	Bolton Wanderers	3–6	Port Vale	Horwich
15:00 GMT	Jones 11'; Doyle 66'; Isgrove 78'	Report	Oyeleke 6'; Legge 9'; Conlon 42' (pen.); Montaño 46'; Worrall 50'; Smith 62'	Stadium: University of Bolton Stadium; Attendance: 0 Referee: Carl Boyeson; Assistant referees: Robert Atkin, David Hunt; Fourth official: Richard Woodward

12 December 2020 17	Port Vale	1–1	Colchester United	Burslem
15:00 GMT	Rodney 58'	Report	Norris 65'	Stadium: Vale Park; Attendance: 0 Referee: Chris Sarginson; Assistant referees: Thomas Harty, Andy Hendley; Fourth official: Geoff Russell

15 December 2020 18	Port Vale	1–1	Forest Green Rovers	Burslem
19:45 GMT	Stokes 34' (og.)	Report	Collins 41'	Stadium: Vale Park; Attendance: 0 Referee: Charles Breakspear; Assistant referees: Lisa Rashid, Daniel Flynn; Fourth official: Gary Hilton

19 December 2020 19	Walsall	4–3	Port Vale	Walsall
15:00 GMT	Scrimshaw 52', 80'; Scarr 56', 82'	Report	Pope 37'; Conlon 44'; Rodney 75'	Stadium: Bescot Stadium; Attendance: 0 Referee: Anthony Backhouse; Assistant referees: Paul Graham, Matthew Smith; Fourth official: Matthew Bristow

26 December 2020 20	Port Vale	0–2	Barrow	Burslem
15:00 GMT		Report	Quigley 23'; Brough 50'	Stadium: Vale Park; Attendance: 0 Referee: Sam Barrott; Assistant referees: Dumitru-Ravel Cheosiaua, Oliver Bickle; Fourth official: Grant Taylor

29 December 2020 21	Bradford City	0–0	Port Vale	Bradford
19:45 GMT		Report		Stadium: Valley Parade; Attendance: 0 Referee: Peter Wright; Assistant referees: Richard Wigglesworth, Daniel Woodward; Fourth official: Wayne Grunnill

2 January 2021 22	Mansfield Town	4–0	Port Vale	Mansfield
15:00 GMT	Clarke 1'; Bowery 32', 77' (pen.), 80'	Report		Stadium: Field Mill; Attendance: 0 Referee: Ben Toner; Assistant referees: Marvyn Amphlett, Abbas Khan; Fourth official: Lisa Rashid

9 January 2021 23	Port Vale	3–0	Grimsby Town	Burslem
15:00 GMT	Brisley 8'; Rodney 15'; Waterfall 60' (og.)	Report		Stadium: Vale Park; Attendance: 0 Referee: Graham Salisbury; Assistant referees: Christopher Husband, Ian Smedley; Fourth official: Anthony Backhouse

16 January 2021 24	Forest Green Rovers	1–1	Port Vale	Nailsworth
15:00 GMT	Cadden 20'	Report	Rodney 76'	Stadium: The New Lawn; Attendance: 0 Referee: Kevin Johnson; Assistant referees: Andrew Laver, Robert Dabbs; Fourth official: Sam Allison

23 January 2021 25	Port Vale	1–3	Walsall	Burslem
15:00 GMT	Conlon 33'	Report	Adebayo 6', 55'; Fitzpatrick 68' (og.)	Stadium: Vale Park; Attendance: 0 Referee: Lee Swabey; Assistant referees: Darren Wilding, Geoff Russell, Richard Woodward; Fourth official: Peter Wright

26 January 2021 26	Scunthorpe United	2–0	Port Vale	Scunthorpe
19:45 GMT	Loft 26', 32'	Report		Stadium: Glanford Park; Attendance: 0 Referee: James Bell; Assistant referees: Kenwyn Hughes, David Hunt; Fourth official: William Smallwood

30 January 2021 27	Port Vale	5–1	Southend United	Burslem
15:00 GMT	Rodney 1', 45+2'; Cordner 20' (og.); Crookes 27'; Oyeleke 89'	Report	Ferguson 85'	Stadium: Vale Park; Attendance: 0 Referee: Carl Brook; Assistant referees: Daniel Flynn, Martyn Holmes; Fourth official: Mark Cunliffe

6 February 2021 28	Tranmere Rovers	3–1	Port Vale	Birkenhead
15:00 GMT	Woolery 17'; Vaughan 30', 59'	Report	Taylor 41'	Stadium: Prenton Park; Attendance: 0 Referee: Alan Young; Assistant referees: Gary Hilton, Peter Gooch; Fourth official: Conor Brown

20 February 2021 29	Leyton Orient	1–1	Port Vale	Leyton
15:00 GMT	Kemp 63'	Report	Worrall 47'	Stadium: Brisbane Road; Attendance: 0 Referee: Graham Salisbury; Assistant referees: Nicholas Cooper, Christopher Kidd; Fourth official: Gregory Read

23 February 2021 30	Port Vale	0–0	Stevenage	Burslem
19:45 GMT		Report		Stadium: Vale Park; Attendance: 0 Referee: Martin Coy; Assistant referees: Ian Smedley, Gary Hilton, Andrew Dallison, William Smallwood; Fourth official: Joe Clark

27 February 2021 31	Port Vale	0–1	Cambridge United	Burslem
15:00 GMT		Report	O'Neil 85'	Stadium: Vale Park; Attendance: 0 Referee: Lee Swabey; Assistant referees: Alistair Nelson, Christopher Husband; Fourth official: Peter Wright

2 March 2021 32	Salford City	1–0	Port Vale	Salford
19:45 GMT	Henderson 45'	Report		Stadium: Moor Lane; Attendance: 0 Referee: Tom Nield; Assistant referees: Andy Hendley, Christopher Ward; Fourth official: Steven Copeland

6 March 2021 33	Cheltenham Town	3–2	Port Vale	Cheltenham
15:00 GMT	May 14'; Brown 18' (og.); Sercombe 75'	Report	Swan 83'; Hurst 85'	Stadium: Whaddon Road; Attendance: 0 Referee: Robert Lewis; Assistant referees: Andrew Laver, Simon Shaw; Fourth official: Louis Marks

9 March 2021 34	Port Vale	0–0	Oldham Athletic	Burslem
19:45 GMT		Report		Stadium: Vale Park; Attendance: 0 Referee: Kevin Johnson; Assistant referees: Richard Bartlett, Abbas Khan; Fourth official: Anthony Moore

13 March 2021 35	Port Vale	0–1	Bolton Wanderers	Burslem
15:00 GMT		Report	Jones 63'	Stadium: Vale Park; Attendance: 0 Referee: Craig Hicks; Assistant referees: Hristo Karaivanov, Mark Cunliffe; Fourth official: Ollie Williams

16 March 2021 36	Port Vale	2–1	Newport County	Burslem
19:00 GMT	Conlon 12'; Rodney 75'	Report	Scrimshaw 55'	Stadium: Vale Park; Attendance: 0 Referee: Marc Edwards; Assistant referees: Grant Taylor, Richard Morris; Fourth official: Paul Graham

20 March 2021 37	Colchester United	0–1	Port Vale	Colchester
15:00 GMT		Report	Rodney 19'	Stadium: Colchester Community Stadium; Attendance: 0 Referee: Bobby Madley; Assistant referees: Damith Bandara, Conor Farrell; Fourth official: Anthony Da Costa

27 March 2021 38	Crawley Town	1–3	Port Vale	Crawley
15:00 GMT	Nadesan 45'	Report	Conlon 13'; Smith 65'; Worrall 76'	Stadium: Broadfield Stadium; Attendance: 0 Referee: Chris Sarginson; Assistant referees: Stephen Brown, Martyn Holmes; Fourth official: Michael Chard

2 April 2021 39	Port Vale	1–0	Exeter City	Burslem
15:00 BST	Robinson 2'	Report		Stadium: Vale Park; Attendance: 0 Referee: Leigh Doughty; Assistant referees: Mark Jones, George Byrne; Fourth official: Philip Dermott

5 April 2021 40	Harrogate Town	0–2	Port Vale	Harrogate
15:00 BST		Report	Worrall 48'; Guthrie 90'	Stadium: Wetherby Road; Attendance: 0 Referee: Rebecca Welch; Assistant referees: Geoffrey Liddle, Barry Gordon; Fourth official: Seb Stockbridge

10 April 2021 41	Port Vale	1–0	Morecambe	Burslem
15:00 BST	Smith 34'	Report		Stadium: Vale Park; Attendance: 0 Referee: Antony Coggins; Assistant referees: Dean Treleaven, Kevin Morris; Fourth official: Oliver Bickle

17 April 2021 42	Carlisle United	0–0	Port Vale	Carlisle
15:00 BST		Report		Stadium: Brunton Park; Attendance: 0 Referee: Peter Wright; Assistant referees: Robert Atkin, Ivan Stankovic; Fourth official: Paul Newhouse

20 April 2021 43	Barrow	0–2	Port Vale	Barrow-in-Furness
19:45 BST		Report	Conlon 30', 76'	Stadium: Holker Street; Attendance: 0 Referee: Andy Haines; Assistant referees: Mark Cunliffe, Paul Graham; Fourth official: Matthew Dicicco

24 April 2021 44	Port Vale	2–1	Bradford City	Burslem
15:00 BST	Robinson 16'; Conlon 32' (pen.)	Report	Donaldson 14'	Stadium: Vale Park; Attendance: 0 Referee: Ben Speedie; Assistant referees: James Vallance, Steven Plane; Fourth official: Will Finnie

1 May 2021 45	Grimsby Town	1–0	Port Vale	Cleethorpes
15:00 BST	Green 32'	Report		Stadium: Blundell Park; Attendance: 0 Referee: Will Finnie; Assistant referees: Conor Brown, Declan Ford; Fourth official: Daniel Woodward

8 May 2021 46	Port Vale	0–2	Mansfield Town	Burslem
15:00 BST		Report	McLaughlin 10', 63'; Quinn 30'	Stadium: Vale Park; Attendance: 0 Referee: Sam Allison; Assistant referees: Grant Taylor, John Flynn; Fourth official: Kevin Morris

=== FA Cup ===
Win Draw Loss

7 November 2020 R1	Port Vale	0–1	King's Lynn Town	Burslem
15:00 GMT		Report	Carey 82'	Stadium: Vale Park; Attendance: 0 Referee: David Richardson; Assistant referees: Kevin Morris, Peter Gooch; Fourth official: Steven Copeland

=== EFL Cup ===
Win Draw Loss

5 September 2020 R1	Scunthorpe United	1–2	Port Vale	Scunthorpe
15:00 BST	Loft 69'	Report	Mills 45+5'; Robinson 90+3'	Stadium: Sands Venue Stadium; Attendance: 0 Referee: Neil Hair; Assistant referees: Christopher Ward, Oliver Bickle; Fourth official: Thomas Parsons

15 September 2020 R2	Fleetwood Town	2–1	Port Vale	Fleetwood
19:00 BST	Madden 14'; Morris 75'	Report	Whitehead 49'	Stadium: Highbury Stadium; Attendance: 0 Referee: Ross Joyce; Assistant referees: Graeme Fyvie, Alan Clayton; Fourth official: Mark Cunliffe

=== EFL Trophy ===
Win Draw Loss

Pos	Div	Team	Pld	W	PW	PL	L	GF	GA	GD	Pts	Qualification
1	L2	Port Vale	3	2	1	0	0	7	3	+4	8	Advance to Round 2
2	L2	Tranmere Rovers	3	1	1	1	0	5	4	+1	6	Advance to Round 2
3	L1	Wigan Athletic	3	1	0	1	1	9	6	+3	4	
4	ACA	Liverpool U21	3	0	0	0	3	5	13	−8	0	

Source: EFL.com

8 September 2020 Group stage	Port Vale	0–0 (4–3 p)	Tranmere Rovers	Burslem
19:45 BST		Report		Stadium: Vale Park; Attendance: 0 Referee: Declan Bourne; Assistant referees: Andrew Dallison, Chris Isherwood; Fourth official: Scott Tallis
	Penalties
	Whitehead (penalty scored); Cullen (penalty scored); Conlon (penalty missed); Trickett-Smith (penalty missed); Rodney (penalty scored); Fitzpatrick (penalty scored)		Banks (penalty scored); Khan (penalty missed); Morris (penalty scored); O'Connor (penalty scored); Payne (penalty missed); Walker-Rice (penalty missed)

6 October 2020 Group stage	Wigan Athletic	1–3	Port Vale	Wigan
19:45 BST	Pearce 79'	Report	Robinson 13', 30'; Montaño 55'	Stadium: DW Stadium; Attendance: 0 Referee: Sam Barrott; Assistant referees: Robert Atkin, Christopher Husband; Fourth official: David Richardson

10 November 2020 Group stage	Port Vale	4–2	Liverpool U21	Burslem
19:45 GMT	Cullen 12'; Hurst 19'; McKirdy 61'; Rodney 64'	Report	Millar 11', 34'	Stadium: Vale Park; Attendance: 0 Referee: Thomas Bramall; Assistant referees: Oliver Bickle, Matthew Perry; Fourth official: Matthew Bristow

8 December 2020 R2	Port Vale	2–1	Wolverhampton Wanderers U21	Burslem
19:00 GMT	McKirdy 27'; Mills 80'	Report	Perry 20'	Stadium: Vale Park; Attendance: 0 Referee: Scott Oldham; Assistant referees: Kevin Morris, Joe Simpson; Fourth official: Lewis Smith

12 January 2021 R3	Sunderland	2–0	Port Vale	Sunderland
18:00 GMT	O'Brien 21'; McGeady 90+7' (pen.)	Report		Stadium: Stadium of Light; Attendance: 0 Referee: Declan Bourne; Assistant referees: Kevin Mulraine, Gareth Mellor; Fourth official: Garreth Rhodes

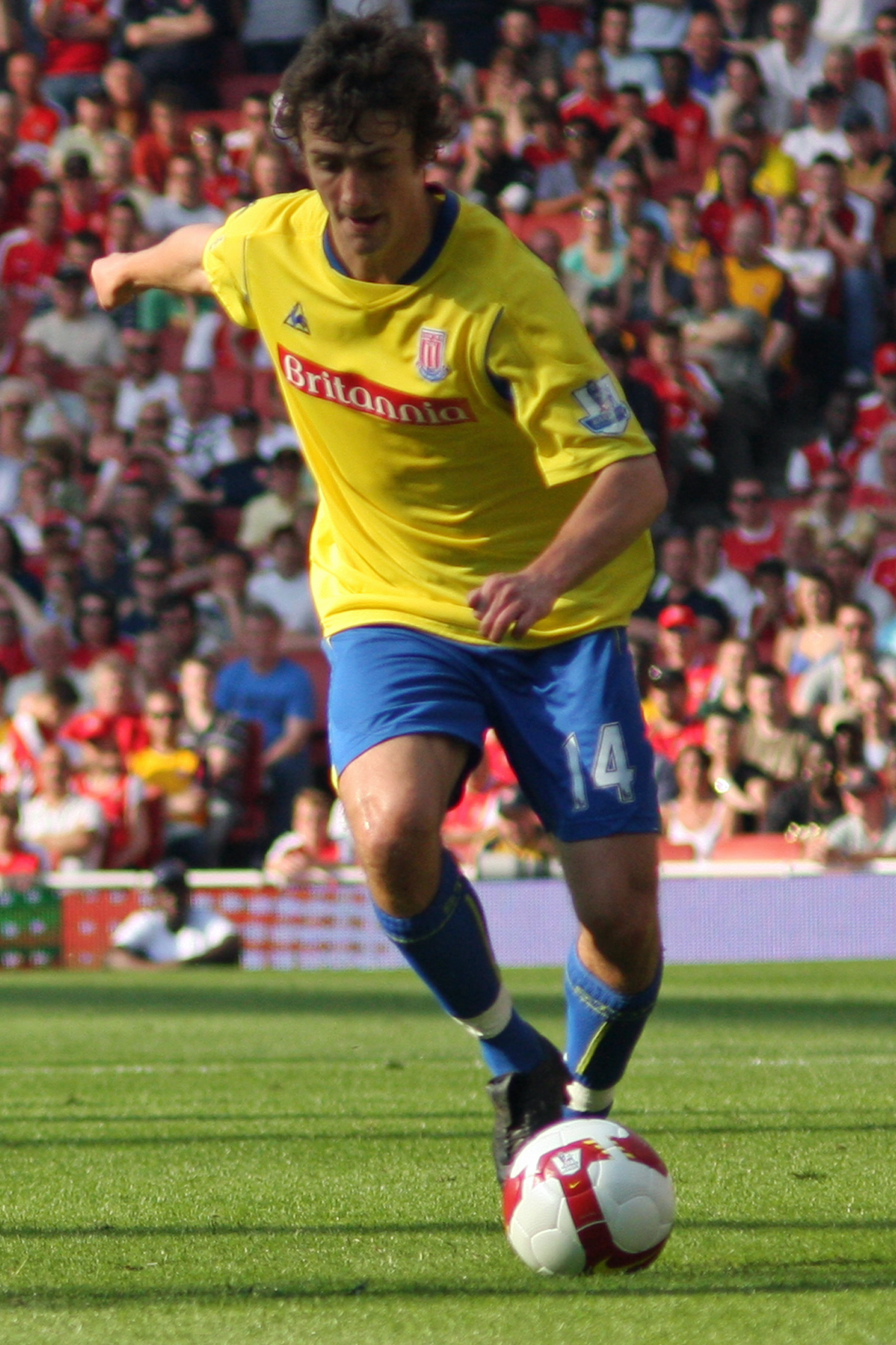
Caretaker manager Danny Pugh.

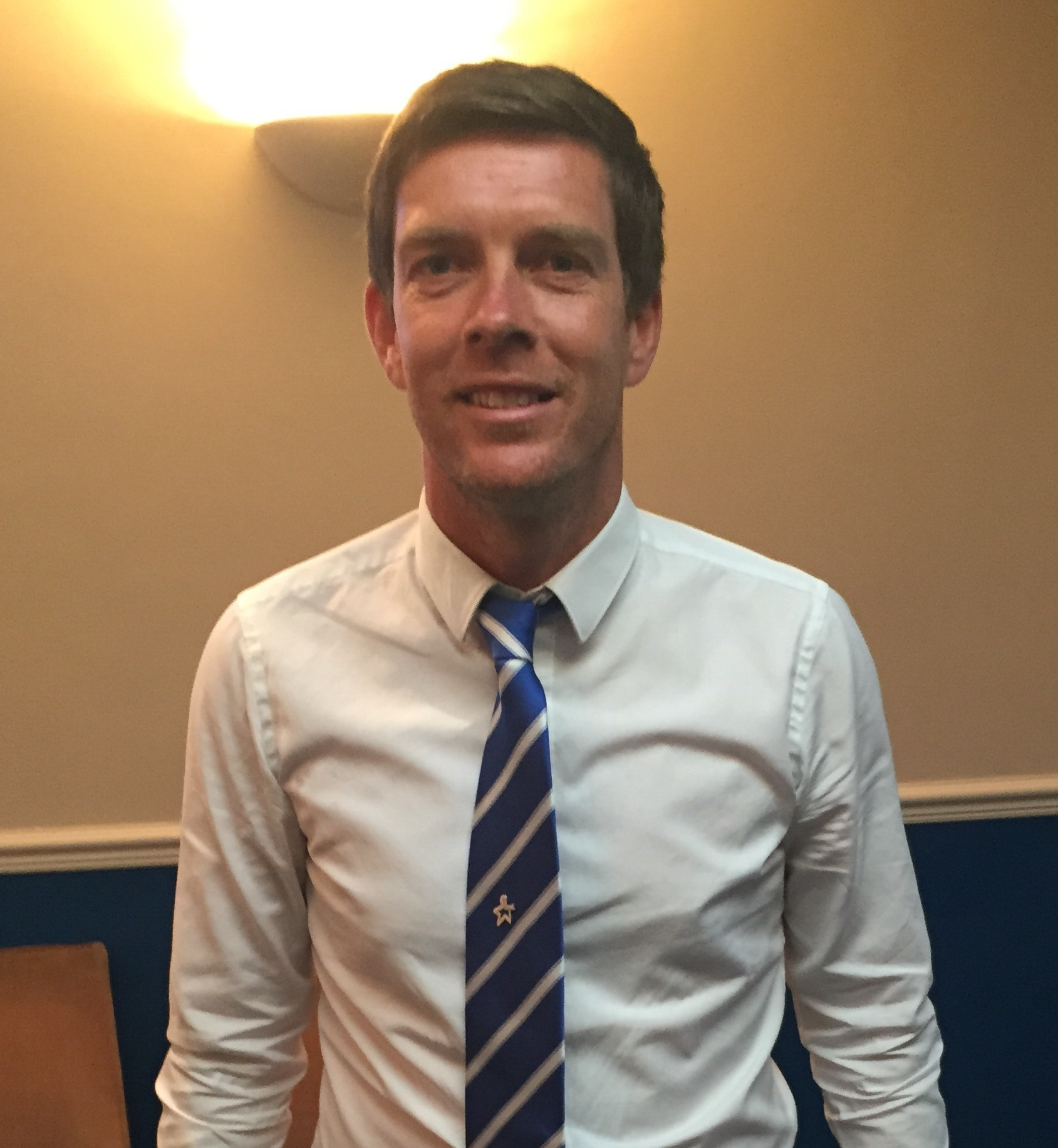
New manager Darrell Clarke.

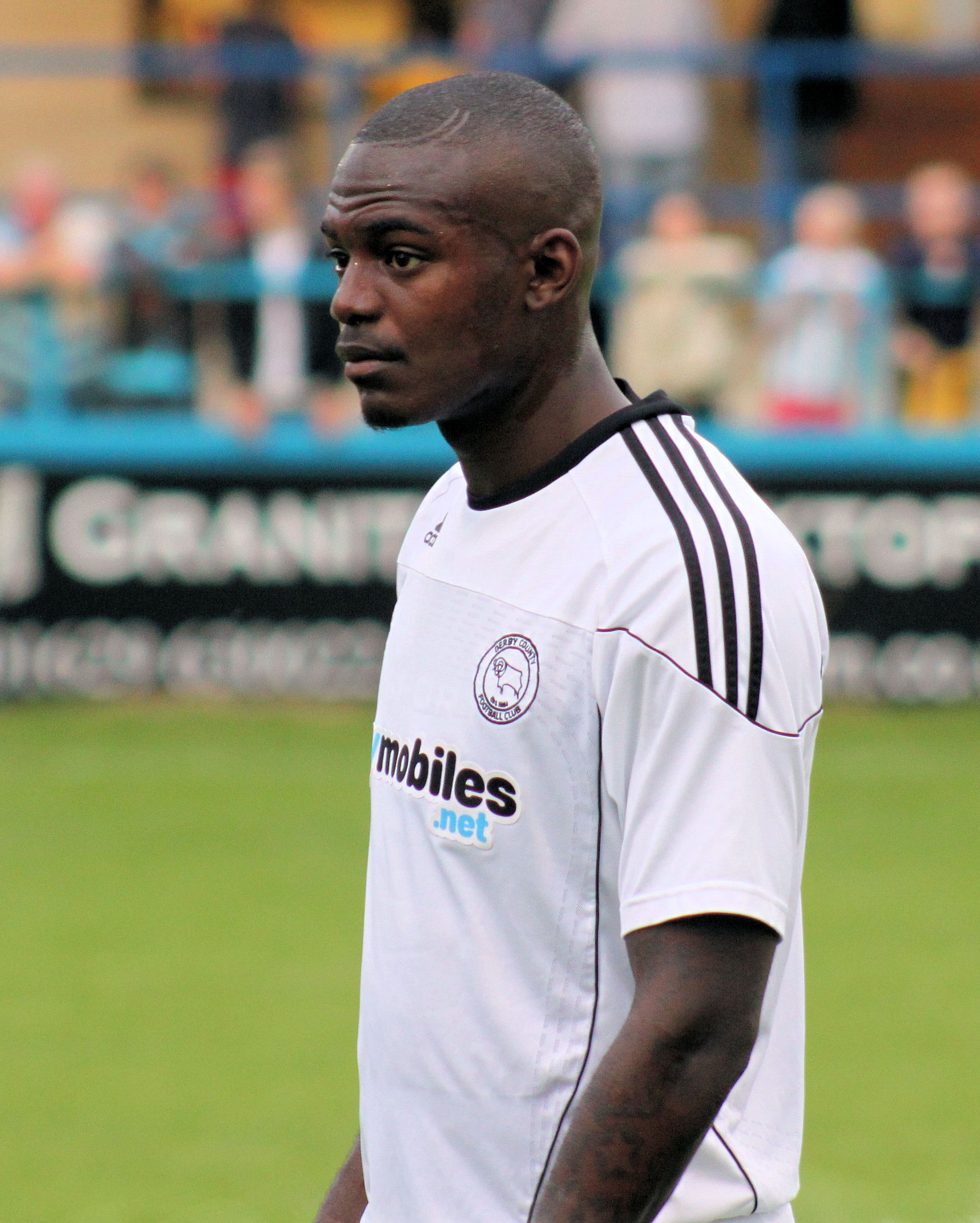
Theo Robinson scored six goals.

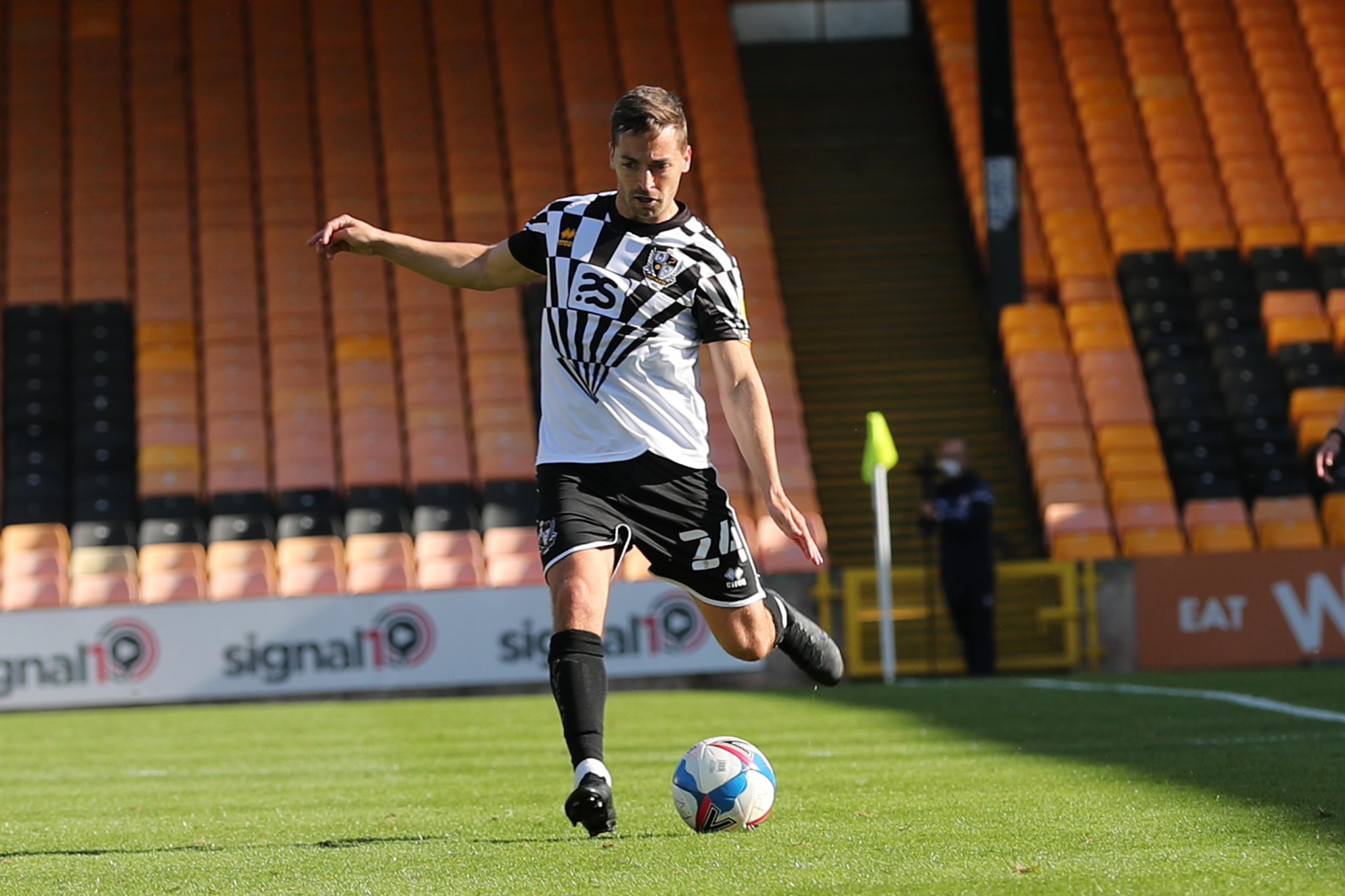
David Fitzpatrick played 27 games.

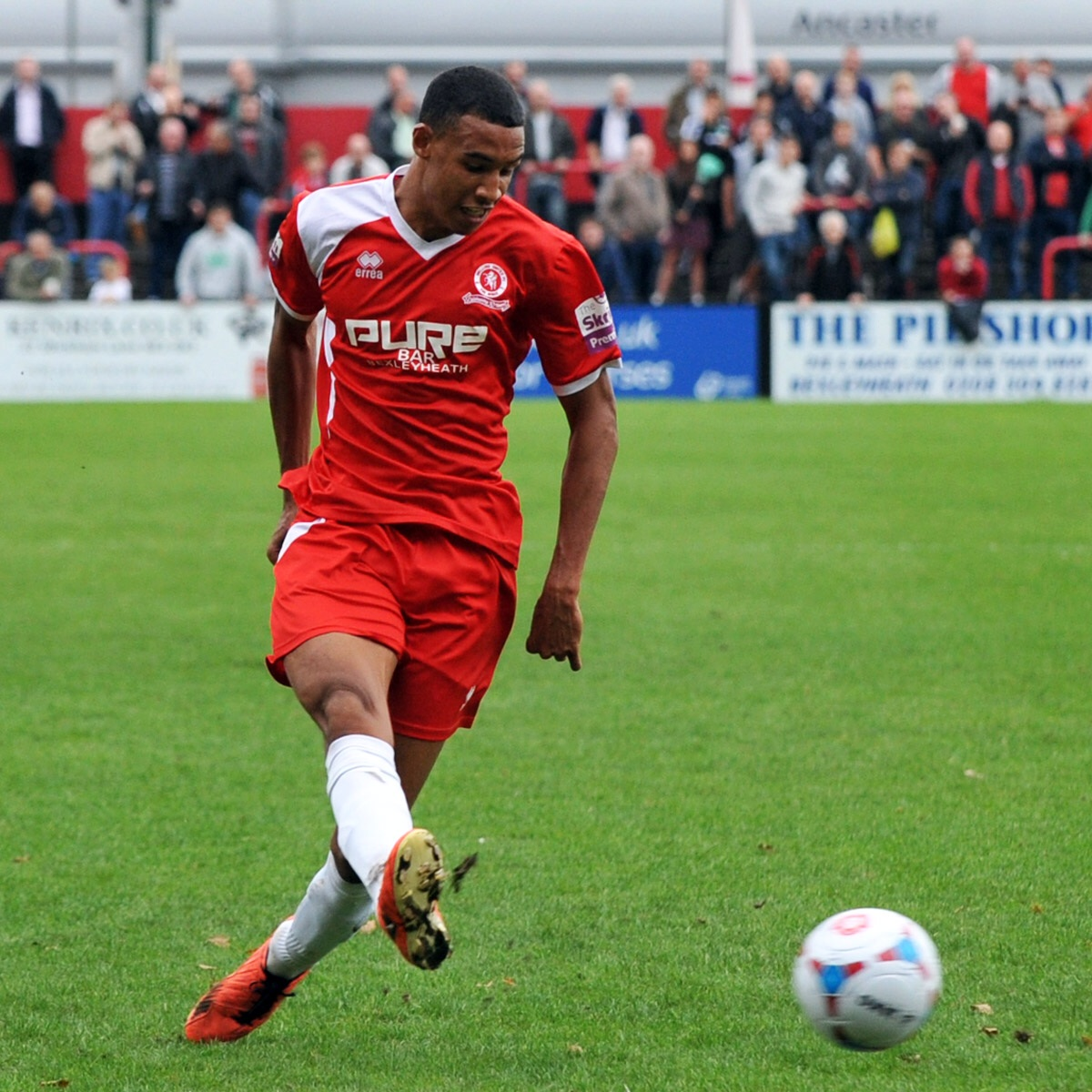
Kurtis Guthrie scored one goal in 17 games.

== Squad statistics ==
=== Appearances and goals ===
Key to positions: GK – Goalkeeper; DF – Defender; MF – Midfielder; FW – Forward

No.	Pos	Nat	Player	Total		EFL League Two		FA Cup		EFL Cup		EFL Trophy	
No.	Pos	Nat	Player	Apps	Goals	Apps	Goals	Apps	Goals	Apps	Goals	Apps	Goals
1	GK	(England) ENG	Scott Brown	48	0	46	0	1	0	1	0	0	0
2	DF	(England) ENG	James Gibbons	12	0	11	0	0	0	0	0	1	0
3	DF	(England) ENG	Adam Crookes	22	1	16	1	1	0	1	0	4	0
4	MF	(England) ENG	Luke Joyce	46	0	41	0	1	0	2	0	2	0
5	DF	(England) ENG	Leon Legge	40	3	37	3	1	0	1	0	1	0
6	DF	(England) ENG	Nathan Smith	50	4	44	4	1	0	1	0	4	0
7	MF	(England) ENG	David Worrall	42	5	37	5	1	0	2	0	2	0
9	FW	(England) ENG	Tom Pope	23	3	19	3	1	0	0	0	3	0
10	MF	(England) ENG	Tom Conlon	48	10	42	10	1	0	1	0	4	0
11	MF	(Colombia) COL	Cristian Montaño	34	4	29	3	0	0	1	0	4	1
12	FW	(Jamaica) JAM	Theo Robinson	37	6	29	3	1	0	2	1	5	2
13	FW	(England) ENG	Mark Cullen	22	3	18	2	0	0	1	0	3	1
14	FW	(England) ENG	Kurtis Guthrie	17	1	17	1	0	0	0	0	0	0
15	DF	(England) ENG	Zak Mills	25	2	21	0	0	0	2	1	2	1
16	DF	(England) ENG	Shaun Brisley	29	1	24	1	0	0	1	0	4	0
17	MF	(England) ENG	Jake Taylor	13	1	12	1	0	0	0	0	1	0
18	MF	(England) ENG	Danny Whitehead	20	1	15	0	0	0	2	1	3	0
19	MF	(England) ENG	David Amoo	29	1	26	1	1	0	0	0	2	0
20	MF	(England) ENG	Scott Burgess	31	0	24	0	1	0	2	0	4	0
21	FW	(England) ENG	Devante Rodney	44	12	40	11	0	0	1	0	3	1
22	MF	(England) ENG	Harry McKirdy	12	2	8	0	1	0	1	0	2	2
23	DF	(England) ENG	Ryan Campbell-Gordon	0	0	0	0	0	0	0	0	0	0
24	DF	(England) ENG	David Fitzpatrick	27	0	22	0	0	0	1	0	4	0
25	MF	(England) ENG	Daniel Trickett-Smith	2	0	0	0	0	0	1	0	1	0
26	MF	(England) ENG	Luke Chambers	0	0	0	0	0	0	0	0	0	0
27	MF	(England) ENG	Alex Hurst	26	2	20	1	0	0	1	0	5	1
28	DF	(England) ENG	Michael Lennon	0	0	0	0	0	0	0	0	0	0
29	FW	(England) ENG	Eden Bailey	0	0	0	0	0	0	0	0	0	0
30	GK	(South Africa) RSA	Dino Visser	6	0	0	0	0	0	1	0	5	0
31	GK	(England) ENG	Joe Collinge	0	0	0	0	0	0	0	0	0	0
32	GK	(England) ENG	Tom Scott	0	0	0	0	0	0	0	0	0	0
33	DF	(England) ENG	Mustapha Olagunju	6	0	6	0	0	0	0	0	0	0
34	FW	(England) ENG	Will Swan	10	1	10	1	0	0	0	0	0	0
Players who featured but departed the club during the season:
8	MF	(England) ENG	Manny Oyeleke	23	2	20	2	0	0	1	0	2	0
17	DF	(Wales) WAL	Mitch Clark	12	1	11	1	1	0	0	0	0	0

=== Top scorers ===
Place	Position	Nation	Number	Name	EFL League Two	FA Cup	EFL Cup	EFL Trophy	Total
1	FW	England	21	Devante Rodney	11	0	0	1	12
2	MF	England	10	Tom Conlon	10	0	0	0	10
3	FW	Jamaica	12	Theo Robinson	3	0	1	2	6
4	MF	England	7	David Worrall	5	0	0	0	5
5	MF	Colombia	11	Cristian Montaño	3	0	0	1	4
–	DF	England	6	Nathan Smith	4	0	0	0	4
7	FW	England	13	Mark Cullen	2	0	0	1	3
–	DF	England	5	Leon Legge	3	0	0	0	3
–	FW	England	9	Tom Pope	3	0	0	0	3
10	FW	England	27	Alex Hurst	1	0	0	1	2
–	MF	England	22	Harry McKirdy	0	0	0	2	2
–	DF	England	15	Zak Mills	0	0	1	1	2
–	MF	England	8	Manny Oyeleke	2	0	0	0	2
14	DF	England	19	David Amoo	1	0	0	0	1
–	DF	England	16	Shaun Brisley	1	0	0	0	1
–	DF	Wales	17	Mitch Clark	1	0	0	0	1
–	DF	England	3	Adam Crookes	1	0	0	0	1
–	FW	England	14	Kurtis Guthrie	1	0	0	0	1
–	FW	England	34	Will Swan	1	0	0	0	1
–	MF	England	17	Jake Taylor	1	0	0	0	1
–	MF	England	18	Danny Whitehead	0	0	1	0	1
–	–	–	–	Own goals	3	0	0	0	3
				TOTALS	57	0	3	9	69

=== Disciplinary record ===
Number	Nation	Position	Name	EFL League Two		FA Cup		EFL Cup		EFL Trophy		Total	
Number	Nation	Position	Name	Yellow card	Red card	Yellow card	Red card	Yellow card	Red card	Yellow card	Red card	Yellow card	Red card
5	England	DF	Leon Legge	11	2	1	0	1	0	0	0	13	2
11	Colombia	MF	Cristian Montaño	9	1	0	0	1	0	0	0	10	1
4	England	MF	Luke Joyce	4	1	0	0	0	0	0	0	4	1
16	England	DF	Shaun Brisley	7	0	0	0	1	0	1	0	9	0
10	England	MF	Tom Conlon	2	0	1	0	0	0	2	0	5	0
14	England	FW	Kurtis Guthrie	4	0	0	0	0	0	0	0	4	0
15	England	DF	Zak Mills	3	0	0	0	1	0	0	0	4	0
1	England	GK	Scott Brown	3	0	0	0	0	0	0	0	3	0
8	England	MF	Manny Oyeleke	3	0	0	0	0	0	0	0	3	0
21	England	FW	Devante Rodney	3	0	0	0	0	0	0	0	3	0
7	England	MF	David Worrall	3	0	0	0	0	0	0	0	3	0
3	England	DF	Adam Crookes	2	0	0	0	0	0	0	0	2	0
19	England	MF	David Amoo	1	0	0	0	0	0	0	0	1	0
17	Wales	DF	Mitch Clark	1	0	0	0	0	0	0	0	1	0
24	England	DF	David Fitzpatrick	0	0	0	0	0	0	1	0	1	0
2	England	DF	James Gibbons	1	0	0	0	0	0	0	0	1	0
27	England	MF	Alex Hurst	0	0	0	0	1	0	0	0	1	0
6	England	DF	Nathan Smith	1	0	0	0	0	0	0	0	1	0
34	England	FW	Will Swan	1	0	0	0	0	0	0	0	1	0
18	England	MF	Danny Whitehead	1	0	0	0	0	0	0	0	1	0
			TOTALS	59	4	2	0	5	0	4	0	70	4

Sourced from Soccerway.

== Awards ==
End of Season Awards	Winner
Player of the Year	Tom Conlon
Players' Player of the Year	Tom Conlon
Club Player of the Year	Tom Conlon
Supporters' Club Player of the Year	Tom Conlon
Goal of the Season	Tom Conlon (vs Barrow, 20 April 2021)
Young Player of the Year	Devante Rodney
Youth Player of the Year	Eden Bailey
Community Champion	Scott Brown
Official Away Travel Player of the Year	David Worrall
EFL Long Service award	Steve Speed (groundsman)
EFL Awards	Winner
Community Club of the Year (Overall)	Port Vale
Community Club of the Year (Midlands)	Port Vale
Contribution to League football	John Rudge
EFL League Two Team of the Season	David Worrall

== Transfers ==
=== Transfers in ===
Date from	Position	Nationality	Name	From	Fee	Ref.
7 July 2020	CF	ENG	Devante Rodney	Salford City	Free transfer	
16 July 2020	RB	ENG	Zak Mills	Oldham Athletic	Free transfer	
3 August 2020	CM	ENG	Danny Whitehead	Salford City	Free transfer	
24 August 2020	CF	JAM	Theo Robinson	Southend United	Free transfer	
25 August 2020	LB	ENG	David Fitzpatrick	Macclesfield Town	Free transfer	
27 August 2020	GK	RSA	Dino Visser	Crewe Alexandra	Free transfer	
11 September 2020	AM	ENG	Harry McKirdy	Carlisle United	Free transfer	
11 January 2021	CM	ENG	Jake Taylor	Nottingham Forest	Undisclosed	
15 January 2021	CF	ENG	Kurtis Guthrie	Bradford City	Free transfer	
25 January 2021	GK	ENG	Tom Scott	Manchester City	Free transfer	

=== Transfers out ===
Date from	Position	Nationality	Name	To	Fee	Ref.
5 August 2020	FW	ENG	Maxwell Chimenes	Newcastle Town	Free transfer	
29 August 2020	RW	ATG	Rhys Browne	Wealdstone	Mutual consent	
23 September 2020	CM	ENG	Hayden Campbell	Salford City	Free transfer	
13 April 2021	CM	ENG	Manny Oyeleke	Chesterfield	£10,000	
10 May 2021	CB	ENG	Shaun Brisley	Wrexham	Released	
10 May 2021	GK	ENG	Scott Brown	Exeter City	Released	
10 May 2021	LB	ENG	Ryan Campbell-Gordon	Hanley Town	Released	
10 May 2021	CB	ENG	Adam Crookes	Grimsby Town	Released	
10 May 2021	CF	ENG	Mark Cullen	Hartlepool United	Released	
10 May 2021	LB	ENG	David Fitzpatrick	Altrincham	Released	
10 May 2021	CF	ENG	Kurtis Guthrie	(India) RoundGlass Punjab	Released	
10 May 2021	DM	ENG	Luke Joyce	AFC Fylde	Released	
10 May 2021	AM	ENG	Harry McKirdy	Swindon Town	Released	
10 May 2021	RB	ENG	Zak Mills	Walsall	Released	
10 May 2021	LB	COL	Cristian Montaño	(Scotland) Livingston	Released	
10 May 2021	CF	ENG	Tom Pope	Congleton Town	Released	
10 May 2021	GK	ENG	Tom Scott	FC Halifax Town	Released	
10 May 2021	AM	ENG	Daniel Trickett-Smith	Leek Town	Released	
10 May 2021	GK	RSA	Dino Visser	Hereford	Released	

=== Loans in ===
Date from	Position	Nationality	Name	From	Date until	Ref.
9 October 2020	RB	WAL	Mitch Clark	Leicester City	1 January 2021	
1 February 2021	CB	ENG	Mustapha Olagunju	Huddersfield Town	End of season	
1 February 2021	MF	ENG	Will Swan	Nottingham Forest	End of season	

=== Loans out ===
Date from	Position	Nationality	Name	From	Date until	Ref.
19 September 2020	LB	ENG	Ryan Campbell-Gordon	Hednesford Town	26 October 2020	
13 October 2020	AM	ENG	Daniel Trickett-Smith	Leek Town	1 January 2021	
27 October 2020	LB	ENG	Ryan Campbell-Gordon	Gainsborough Trinity	1 January 2021	
