= David Fitzpatrick (footballer, born 1990) =

English footballer (born 1990)

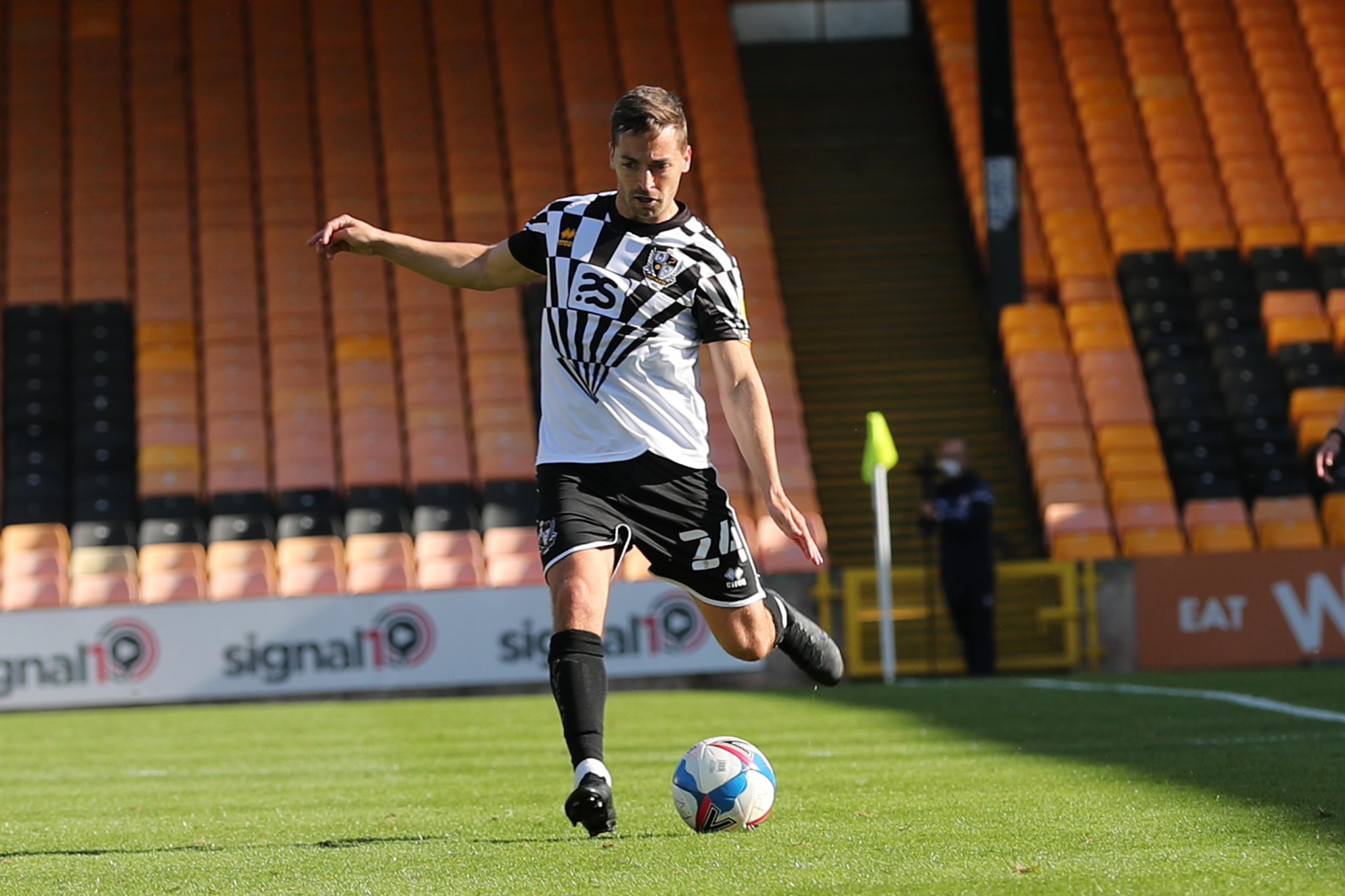
- Fitzpatrick playing for Port Vale in 2020.

Personal information
- Full name: David James Fitzpatrick
- Date of birth: 28 February 1990 (age 36)
- Place of birth: Manchester, England
- Height: 1.79 m (5 ft 10 in)
- Position: Left back

Team information
- Current team: Avro

Youth career
- –2010: Stockport County

Senior career*
Years	Team	Apps	(Gls)
2010–2011	Northwich Victoria		
2011	New Mills		
2011–2012	Northwich Victoria		
2012–2013	New Mills		
2013–2015	Southport	80	(3)
2015–2020	Macclesfield Town	181	(4)
2020–2021	Port Vale	22	(0)
2021	Altrincham	9	(0)
2022	Chester	20	(0)
2022–2024	Radcliffe	21	(0)
2024–	Avro (Note: Statistics for the 2025–26 season not known.)	54	(3)

International career
2013–2014	England C	3	(0)
- * Club domestic league appearances and goals as of 19:22, 26 April 2026 (UTC)

David James Fitzpatrick (born 28 February 1990) is an English professional footballer who plays as a left back for Northern Premier League Premier Division club Avro.

Fitzpatrick began his career playing semi-professional football for Northwich Victoria and New Mills in the Northern Premier League. He won the Cheshire Senior Cup with Northwich in 2011, scoring both goals in the final. He joined Southport in 2013. He established himself in the Conference Premier with 80 league appearances in two seasons, also winning three caps for the England C team. He signed with Macclesfield Town in September 2015 and soon established himself in the first team, helping the club to reach the 2017 FA Trophy final. He played all 46 league games of the 2017–18 National League title-winning campaign and made his debut in the English Football League the next season at the age of 28. He signed with Port Vale in August 2020 and moved on to Altrincham 12 months later. He signed with Chester in January 2022 and moved on to Radcliffe five months later. He signed with Avro in January 2024 and helped the club to win the Northern Premier League Division One West play-offs in 2026.

== Club career ==
=== Early career ===
Born in Manchester, Fitzpatrick started his career at Stockport County before joining Northern Premier League Premier Division side Northwich Victoria in November 2010. Having made over 30 appearances for the club throughout the 2010–11 season, scoring five goals, he signed a new contract at the end of the season. He scored both of Northwich's goals in their 2–0 victory over Altrincham in the Cheshire Senior Cup final.

As a result of a lack of first-team action, Fitzpatrick was released by Victoria in October 2011 to join Northern Premier League Division One South side New Mills. Fitzpatrick made ten appearances for New Mills, scoring four goals, before rejoining Northwich Victoria on 23 December 2011. Northwich finished the 2011–12 season in second place but were actually relegated due to financial issues. In the summer of 2012, Fitzpatrick rejoined New Mills permanently. The "Millers" finished third in the 2012–13 campaign, but lost out to Trafford in the play-off semi-finals. Whilst playing in the Northern Premier League he also turned out for Altrincham Sunday League pub side Brookland's Tap and worked a full-time job in Human Resources for a claims company.

=== Southport ===
After an impressive season at New Mills, he joined Southport on 28 July 2013, who were managed by former Northwich manager Alan Wright. In Fitzpatrick's first season in the Conference Premier, he made 46 appearances and scored his only goal on the last day of the 2013–14 season, "a stunning 30 yards (27 m) strike" in a 2–1 win over FC Halifax Town at Haig Avenue, won him the club's Goal of the Season award. His second season at the club saw him make 37 league appearances under three different managers: Martin Foyle, Gary Brabin and Paul Carden.

=== Macclesfield Town ===
Following trial periods at Crawley Town and Stevenage, Fitzpatrick joined Macclesfield Town in September 2015 on a four-month contract. In January 2016, his contract with the club was extended until the end of the season. After making 37 appearances for Macclesfield during the 2015–16 season, with Fitzpatrick praised for his performances, he signed a one-year contract extension at the end of the season. The 2016–17 campaign saw Fitzpatrick make 37 league appearances, whilst he also played in the 2017 FA Trophy final at Wembley Stadium, where Macclesfield lost 3–2 to York City. He signed another one-year contract extension in the summer. The 2017–18 season was another successful season for Fitzpatrick as he appeared in every one of Macclesfield's 46 league matches as the club finished top of the National League, and were promoted to League Two, with Fitzpatrick signing a new two-year contract with Macclesfield Town as a result. He was also named in the Non-League Paper's National League Team of the Season, alongside teammate Danny Whitaker and manager John Askey.

On 4 August 2018, he made his first appearance in the English Football League (EFL) in a 3–2 defeat to Swindon Town, before going on to make 40 appearances, scoring thrice in a season where Macclesfield would marginally survive relegation, finishing 22nd. The 2019–20 season saw Fitzpatrick make 21 appearances without scoring as Macclesfield would survive relegation despite a points deduction as a result of Bury's expulsion from the Football League, with the "Silkmen" eventually finishing 23rd. Fitzpatrick accused the EFL of unfairly treating the club as they were deducted a total of 13 points, whilst the League Two campaign was ended early due to the COVID-19 pandemic in England. However, on 11 August, the EFL won an appeal to an independent arbitration panel to deduct a further four points from Macclesfield, relegating the club into the National League and handing a reprieve to Stevenage. He was released at the end of the 2019–20 season.

=== Port Vale ===
On 25 August 2020, Fitzpatrick signed a one-year contract with Port Vale after impressing on trial. He said the decision to sign up was "a no-brainer really" as he previously worked well with former Macclesfield manager John Askey and players such as Danny Whitehead. He was one of 15 players that were released at the end of the 2020–21 season.

=== Non-League ===
He went on to have a trial with Altrincham after manager Phil Parkinson faced an injury crisis in pre-season, with Andy White, Connor Hampson and Shaun Densmore all ruled out; Fitzpatrick was signed to a contract with the National League club on 1 August 2021. On 31 December 2021, Fitzpatrick departed the club at the end of his short-term contract following the return of the injured players whom he was brought in to cover.

On 6 January 2022, Fitzpatrick joined National League North side Chester on a deal until the end of the 2021–22 season; he had previously worked with manager Steve Watson at Macclesfield. His arrival led to the departure of previous incumbent left-back Josh Askew. He made 20 appearances to help the "Seals" to avoid relegation and Watson credited his experience as part of an improved defensive record at the Deva Stadium.

On 27 June 2022, Fitzpatrick joined Northern Premier League Premier Division club Radcliffe. He played 21 matches in the first half of the 2022–23 season. On 19 January 2024, he signed with Northern Premier League Division One West side Avro. He was named as the club's Player of the Month for March. He ended the 2023–24 season with 15 appearances to his name. He featured 42 times in the 2024–25 season, scoring three goals, and he re-signed for the 2025–26 season. He played in Avro's play-off final victory over Stalybridge Celtic at the Whitebank Stadium on 2 May 2026.

== International career ==
On 19 November 2013, Fitzpatrick made his debut for the England C team in a 2–2 draw with Czech Republic U21. He won further caps against Slovakia U23 and Hungary in May 2014.

== Style of play ==
Fitzpatrick is a left-back with good composure who likes to play a simple game.

== Personal life ==
Fitzpatrick worked in Human resources from 2010 to 2020.

== Career statistics ==
As of end of the 2025–26 season

Appearances and goals by club, season and competition
Club	Season	League			FA Cup		EFL Cup		Other		Total	
Club	Season	Division	Apps	Goals	Apps	Goals	Apps	Goals	Apps	Goals	Apps	Goals
Southport	2013–14	Conference Premier	43	1	2	0	—		1 (Note: Appearance(s) in FA Trophy.)	0	46	1
Southport	2014–15	Conference Premier	37	2	6	0	—		2	0	45	2
Southport	Total		80	3	8	0	—		3	0	91	3
Macclesfield Town	2015–16	National League	37	0	2	0	—		5	0	44	0
Macclesfield Town	2016–17	National League	37	0	4	0	—		9	0	50	0
Macclesfield Town	2017–18	National League	46	1	2	0	—		0	0	48	1
Macclesfield Town	2018–19	League Two	40	3	1	0	3	0	3 (Note: Appearance(s) in EFL Trophy.)	0	47	3
Macclesfield Town	2019–20	League Two	21	0	0	0	1	0	2	1	24	1
Macclesfield Town	Total		181	4	9	0	4	0	19	1	213	5
Port Vale	2020–21	League Two	22	0	0	0	1	0	4	0	27	0
Altrincham	2021–22	National League	9	0	2	0	—		0	0	11	0
Chester	2021–22	National League North	20	0	0	0	—		0	0	20	0
Radcliffe	2022–23	NPL Premier Division	19	0	1	0	—		1 (Note: Appearance(s) in Manchester Premier Cup.)	0	21	0
Radcliffe	2023–24	NPL Premier Division	2	0	0	0	—		1	0	3	0
Radcliffe	Total		21	0	1	0	—		2	0	24	0
Avro	2023–24	NPL Division One West	15	0	0	0	—		0	0	15	0
Avro	2024–25	NPL Division One West	39	3	1	0	—		2	0	42	3
Avro	2025–26	NPL Division One West										
Avro	2026–27	NPL Division One West	0	0	0	0	—		0	0	0	0
Avro	Total		54	3	1	0	0	0	2	0	57	3
Career total			387	10	21	0	5	0	30	1	443	11

== Honours ==
Northwich Victoria

- Cheshire Senior Cup: 2011

Macclesfield Town

- FA Trophy runner-up: 2017
- National League: 2017–18

Avro

- Northern Premier League Division One West: 2026
