= Scott Burgess (footballer) =

English footballer (born 1997)

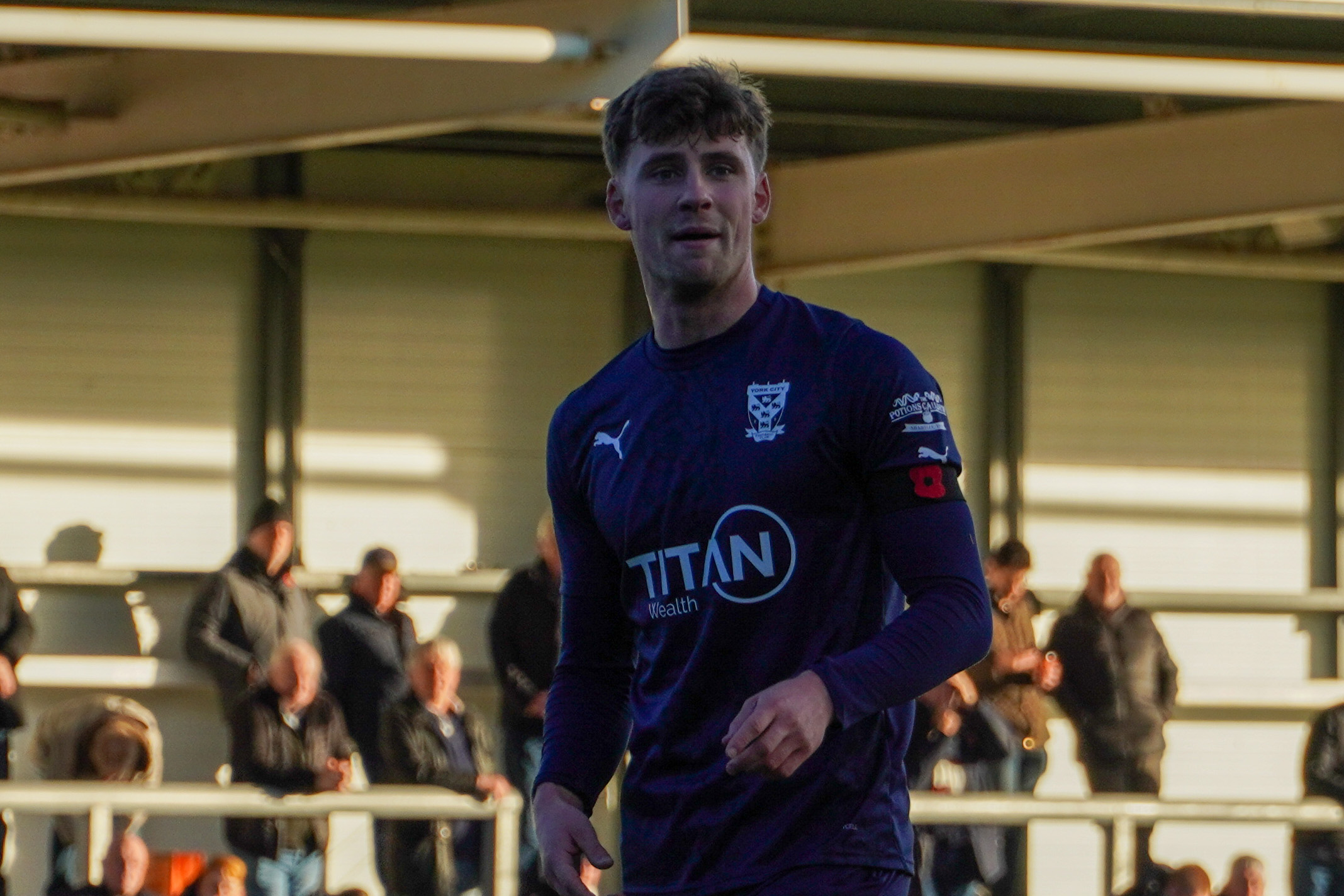
- Scott Burgess in 2023.

Personal information
- Full name: Scott Andrew Burgess
- Date of birth: 12 August 1997 (age 29)
- Place of birth: Warrington, England
- Height: 5 ft 10 in (1.79 m)
- Position: Central midfielder

Team information
- Current team: Chester
- Number: 24

Youth career
- –2014: Bury

Senior career*
| Years | Team | Apps | (Gls) |
| 2014–2019 | Bury | 20 | (2) |
| 2015 | → Stalybridge Celtic (loan) | 3 | (0) |
| 2016 | → Bergsøy (loan) | 14 | (4) |
| 2017–2018 | → Macclesfield Town (loan) | 31 | (0) |
| 2018 | → Wrexham (loan) | 1 | (0) |
| 2019 | → York City (loan) | 16 | (1) |
| 2019–2022 | Port Vale | 50 | (3) |
| 2022 | Grimsby Town | 14 | (0) |
| 2022–2024 | York City | 24 | (1) |
| 2022–2023 | → Kidderminster Harriers (loan) | 4 | (0) |
| 2024–2025 | Truro City | 2 | (0) |
| 2025– | Chester | 19 | (2) |
| 2025 | → Ashton United (loan) | 10 | (0) |
- * Club domestic league appearances and goals as of 10:45, 26 April 2026 (UTC)

Scott Andrew Burgess (born 12 August 1997) is an English semi-professional footballer who plays as a central midfielder for National League North club Chester.

Burgess started his career with Bury, making his first-team debut in May 2014. From there he was loaned out to non-League sides Stalybridge Celtic, Macclesfield Town, Wrexham and York City, as well as Norwegian Third Division club Bergsøy. He spent the 2017–18 season at Macclesfield and helped them win the National League title. He joined Port Vale on a free transfer in May 2019 and stayed with the club for two-and-a-half seasons before joining Grimsby Town in January 2022. He signed with York City in July 2022 and was loaned to Kidderminster Harriers. He joined Truro City in August 2024 and moved on to Chester in January 2025.

== Career ==
=== Bury ===
Burgess was born in Warrington, Cheshire. He came through the youth system of Bury. Burgess played in every youth-team match in the 2013–14 season, making 28 appearances as the team reached the Lancashire Senior Cup final. He made his first-team debut in League Two on 3 May 2014 in a 0–0 draw away to Morecambe, starting the match before being replaced in the 54th minute. He turned professional at the club 12 months later.

On 10 September 2015, Burgess was loaned out for one month to Stalybridge Celtic of the National League North. However, he played only 21 minutes across three substitute appearances for Stalybridge, his final game a 1–0 win over F.C. United of Manchester at Bower Fold. He joined Norwegian Third Division club Bergsøy on 31 March 2016 on loan until July. Bury manager David Flitcroft explained that he had wanted to play Burgess himself but felt unable to due to the team's good home form and poor away form.

With the club now in League One, he broke into the Bury first-team under new head coach Chris Brass during the 2016–17 season and signed a two-year contract extension in December, just days after scoring his first goal in professional football in a 4–2 defeat at Bristol Rovers. He ended the month with his second goal to earn Bury a 1–1 draw at Bradford City, lobbing goalkeeper Colin Doyle on 39 minutes. He ended the campaign with two goals and two assists in 17 appearances, though fell out of favour under new boss Lee Clark and would not feature at all in his next two seasons at Gigg Lane.

Burgess joined National League club Macclesfield Town on 4 July 2017 on loan for the 2017–18 season. He made 22 starts and 11 substitute appearances as Macclesfield were promoted to League Two as 2017–18 National League champions. He scored one goal for Macclesfield, a volley against Stourbridge in the FA Cup, which won him the club's goal of the month award for October. Speaking on his time at Moss Rose, Burgess said "It's a tough league and it's a physical league, I'm learning each day in training and I keep learning more with each game I play and adapting to how team's play, so this loan spell has been good for me."

Burgess joined National League club Wrexham on 22 August 2018 on a three-month loan. He returned to Bury on 22 November after making only two appearances for Sam Ricketts's Wrexham due to the form of other players. He joined National League North club York City on 24 January 2019 on loan until the end of the 2018–19 season. Assistant manager Micky Cummins revealed that manager Steve Watson had previously tried to sign him whilst at Gateshead. Often used as an attacking central midfielder in a 4–3–3 formation, he played 16 matches for York and scored one goal, a long-range volley against Kidderminster Harriers that was named York's goal of the season. The club offered him a permanent contract at the end of the season.

=== Port Vale ===
Burgess signed a one-year contract with League Two club Port Vale, which was managed by former Macclesfield manager John Askey, on 24 May 2019. Speaking in September, Askey said that he would "possibly" look to get Burgess out on loan to a National League side as the midfielder had failed to make a first-team appearance for Vale. He finally made his first-team debut on 24 September, and marked it with a goal in a 3–2 victory at former club Macclesfield Town in the EFL Trophy. After the game he said that "I have had to be patient with the team doing well in the league, but the gaffer spoke to me and just encouraged me in training to keep working hard. I am glad to get my chance and hopefully I have repaid him with a good performance". Despite also scoring in his league debut four days later, he had to wait until the end of October before managing to firmly secure a place in the starting eleven in a high-energy pressing midfield three with Jake Taylor and Luke Joyce. He signed a two-year contract extension in February 2020. He scored four goals in 29 appearances throughout the 2019–20 season and won the club's Young Player of the Year award.

The 2020–21 season was a poor one for Burgess as lots of competition for places in central midfield meant that he made only two starts after Darrell Clarke was appointed manager in February. Clarke placed Burgess on the transfer-list in May 2021. He was not given a squad number for the 2021–22 season and Clarke said that he would try and arrange a loan move into the National League. However, no move materialized and in November Clarke confirmed that Burgess would be reintegrated into the squad and become available for selection for first-team games, though said that Ben Garrity, Tom Pett, Tom Conlon, Jake Taylor and Brad Walker "are probably ahead of him in the pecking order as things stand". On 14 January 2022, Burgess had his contract with Port Vale terminated by mutual consent.

=== Grimsby Town ===
On the same day as his departure from Port Vale was confirmed, Burgess signed for National League club Grimsby Town on a deal to run until the end of the 2021–22 season. Grimsby manager Paul Hurst said that he would offer creativity to the midfield that had been lacking in the absence of John McAtee. Having appeared three times as a substitute in order to help build his fitness, Burgess made his full debut on 12 February in a 3–1 win over Aldershot Town at Blundell Park. Grimsby secured promotion with a 2–1 victory over Solihull Moors in the play-off final at the London Stadium, although Burgess was not in the matchday squad. On 11 June, the club announced their retained list and confirmed that Burgess would be released upon the expiry of his contract at the end of the month.

=== York City ===
On 30 June 2022, Burgess joined newly promoted National League club York City, alongside Grimsby teammate Adam Crookes, both of whom had played under York City manager John Askey at Port Vale. On 30 September 2022, Burgess joined National League North club Kidderminster Harriers on loan until January 2023. He featured eleven times for York and four times for Kidderminster in the 2022–23 season. In October 2023, assistant manager Neil Cox said that he had impressed new manager Neal Ardley in training, and Burgess was given a first appearance in a squad since February as a result. He was a substitute in a 2–1 victory over Dagenham & Redbridge and claimed an assist. He led the club's assist tally when he tore a meniscus in training in February, which left him ruled out of action of the rest of the 2023–24 season. Burgess was not offered a new contract by York City at the end of the season.

=== Truro City ===
On 30 August 2024, Burgess joined National League South club Truro City on non-contract terms, reuniting again with manager John Askey.

=== Chester ===
On 24 January 2025, Burgess joined National League North side Chester. He played three games in the second half of the 2024–25 season, and was an unused substitute in the play-off final defeat to Scunthorpe United. He signed a new one-year deal in July 2025 as he had impressed during his short stay despite spending much of the time out injured. He joined Ashton United of the Northern Premier League on loan on 18 October 2025. He returned to Chester on 29 December after ten appearances. On 28 March 2026, he scored a "brilliant half-volley from distance" to secure a 1–0 win at Curzon Ashton. He played in the play-off quarter-final defeat to Macclesfield.

== Style of play ==
Burgess can play in the centre or right side of midfield and is known as a creative attacking player, though lacking physical presence. Speaking in May 2019, York City assistant manager Micky Cummins described him as brave and comfortable on the ball, with good technical and dead ball skills.

== Career statistics ==
As of match played 28 April 2026

Appearances and goals by club, season and competition
| Club | Season | League | | | FA Cup | | EFL Cup | | Other | | Total | |
| Club | Season | Division | Apps | Goals | Apps | Goals | Apps | Goals | Apps | Goals | Apps | Goals |
|---|---|---|---|---|---|---|---|---|---|---|---|---|
| Bury | 2013–14 | League Two | 1 | 0 | 0 | 0 | 0 | 0 | 0 | 0 | 1 | 0 |
| Bury | 2014–15 | League Two | 0 | 0 | 0 | 0 | 0 | 0 | 0 | 0 | 0 | 0 |
| Bury | 2015–16 | League One | 3 | 0 | 1 | 0 | 0 | 0 | 1 (Note: Appearance in Football League Trophy) | 0 | 5 | 0 |
| Bury | 2016–17 | League One | 16 | 2 | 0 | 0 | 0 | 0 | 1 | 0 | 17 | 2 |
| Bury | 2017–18 | League One | 0 | 0 | — | | — | | — | | 0 | 0 |
| Bury | 2018–19 | League Two | 0 | 0 | — | | 0 | 0 | 0 | 0 | 0 | 0 |
| Bury | Total | | 20 | 2 | 1 | 0 | 0 | 0 | 2 | 0 | 23 | 2 |
| Stalybridge Celtic (loan) | 2015–16 | National League North | 3 | 0 | 0 | 0 | — | | — | | 3 | 0 |
| Bergsøy (loan) | 2016 | Norwegian Third Division | 14 | 4 | — | | — | | — | | 14 | 4 |
| Macclesfield Town (loan) | 2017–18 | National League | 31 | 0 | 1 | 1 | — | | 1 (Note: Appearance in FA Trophy) | 0 | 33 | 1 |
| Wrexham (loan) | 2018–19 | National League | 1 | 0 | 1 | 0 | — | | — | | 2 | 0 |
| York City (loan) | 2018–19 | National League North | 16 | 1 | — | | — | | — | | 16 | 1 |
| Port Vale | 2019–20 | League Two | 24 | 3 | 2 | 0 | 0 | 0 | 3 (Note: Appearance(s) in EFL Trophy) | 1 | 29 | 4 |
| Port Vale | 2020–21 | League Two | 24 | 0 | 1 | 0 | 2 | 0 | 4 | 0 | 31 | 0 |
| Port Vale | 2021–22 | League Two | 2 | 0 | 0 | 0 | 0 | 0 | 1 | 0 | 3 | 0 |
| Port Vale | Total | | 50 | 3 | 3 | 0 | 2 | 0 | 8 | 1 | 63 | 4 |
| Grimsby Town | 2021–22 | National League | 14 | 0 | — | | — | | — | | 14 | 0 |
| York City | 2022–23 | National League | 9 | 0 | 0 | 0 | — | | 2 | 0 | 11 | 0 |
| York City | 2023–24 | National League | 20 | 1 | 5 | 0 | — | | 0 | 0 | 25 | 1 |
| York City | Total | | 29 | 1 | 5 | 0 | 0 | 0 | 2 | 0 | 36 | 1 |
| Kidderminster Harriers (loan) | 2022–23 | National League North | 4 | 0 | 0 | 0 | — | | 0 | 0 | 4 | 0 |
| Truro City | 2024–25 | National League South | 2 | 0 | 1 | 0 | — | | 0 | 0 | 3 | 0 |
| Chester | 2024–25 | National League North | 3 | 0 | — | | — | | 0 | 0 | 3 | 0 |
| Chester | 2025–26 | National League North | 16 | 2 | 0 | 0 | — | | 1 (Note: Appearance in play-offs) | 0 | 17 | 2 |
| Chester | 2026–27 | National League North | 0 | 0 | 0 | 0 | — | | 0 | 0 | 0 | 0 |
| Chester | Total | | 19 | 2 | 0 | 0 | 0 | 0 | 1 | 0 | 20 | 2 |
| Ashton United (loan) | 2025–26 | NPL Premier Division | 10 | 0 | 0 | 0 | — | | 0 | 0 | 10 | 0 |
| Career total | | | 213 | 13 | 12 | 1 | 2 | 0 | 14 | 1 | 241 | 15 |

== Honours ==
Macclesfield Town

- National League: 2017–18
