= Baylee Dipepa =

English footballer (born 12 January 2007)

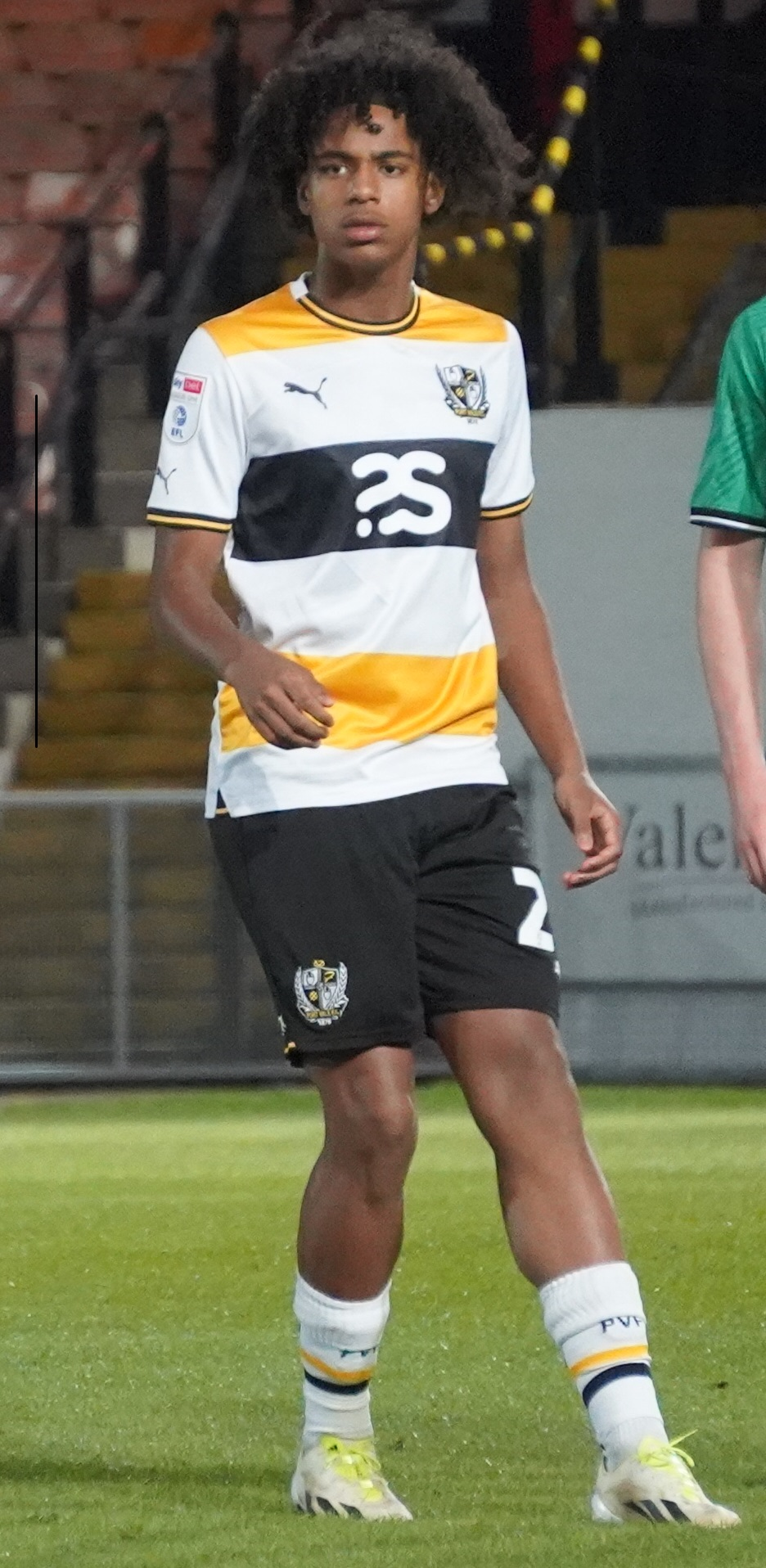
- Dipepa with Port Vale in 2023

Personal information
- Full name: Baylee Jack Dipepa
- Date of birth: 12 January 2007 (age 19)
- Place of birth: Blythe Bridge, England
- Position: Striker

Team information
- Current team: Southampton

Youth career
- 2015–2023: Port Vale

Senior career*
Years	Team	Apps	(Gls)
2023–2024	Port Vale	25	(3)
2024–	Southampton	0	(0)

International career^{‡}
2024	England U17	7	(4)
2024–	England U18	9	(1)
2025–	England U19	1	(1)
- * Club domestic league appearances and goals as of 15:54, 24 August 2024 (UTC) ‡ National team caps and goals as of 11:28, 9 October 2025 (UTC)

Baylee Jack Dipepa (born 12 January 2007) is an English professional footballer who plays as a striker for EFL Championship club Southampton.

Dipepa began his career at Port Vale, playing 31 matches by age 17 and winning caps for England U17. He was sold to Southampton for an undisclosed fee in August 2024.

== Club career ==
=== Port Vale ===
Dipepa first joined Port Vale at under-9 level. He made his first-team debut after coming on as a substitute in a 1–0 win over Crewe Alexandra in an EFL Trophy group stage game at Vale Park on 5 September 2023. On 9 December, at the age of 16 years and 331 days old he became the seventh-youngest player in the club's history to play a Football League game when he came on as a substitute for Ethan Chislett in a 1–0 win at Exeter City. He signed his first professional contract in January 2024, when manager Andy Crosby and director of football, David Flitcroft went on record to praise his good attitude and future potential. He won his first league start under new manager Darren Moore on 27 February, when he picked up an assist in a 2–2 draw with Fleetwood Town. He scored his first career goal in a 2–1 home defeat to Shrewsbury Town on 10 March to become the second-youngest goalscorer in the club's history after 16-year-old teammate Jack Shorrock. He scored his second goal in a 2–0 win over Bristol Rovers on 29 March after he dribbled the ball from 35 yards (32 m) into shooting range. He signed a contract extension in July 2024 to keep him at the club for three years. He was also named as the club's Young Player of the Year. Upon his departure, manager Darren Moore said that "although everybody at the club is sad to see Baylee leave, the offer was fantastic for the club".

=== Southampton ===
On 30 August 2024, Dipepa joined Premier League side Southampton on an undisclosed fee and was assigned to the under-21 squad. He was linked with a move to Shrewsbury Town in January 2026, though the deal collapsed after he sustained a serious injury. Having scored 14 goals in 28 games for Southampton U21 in the 2024–25 season, injuries limited him to 12 appearances and three goals in the 2025–26 campaign. Dipepa signed a three-year contract extension in September 2026.

== International career ==
Dipepa was called up to the England under-17 team in March 2024. He scored twice on his debut having come off the substitutes bench in a 5–1 win over Northern Ireland in 2024 UEFA European Under-17 Championship qualification at St. George's Park. On 20 May 2024, Dipepa was included in the England squad for the 2024 UEFA European Under-17 Championship. He scored his only goal of the tournament in the opening group game against France. He came off the bench as a substitute in the quarter-final and successfully took his penalty as England were eliminated by Italy on penalties.

He was named in the England under-18 squad for the Lafarge Foot Avenir in August 2024. On 4 September 2024, he made his U18 debut against Portugal.

Dipepa made a goalscoring debut for the England U19s during a 2–0 win over Ukraine at Pinatar Arena on 3 September 2025.

== Career statistics ==
As of match played 24 August 2024

Appearances and goals by club, season and competition
Club	Season	League			FA Cup		EFL Cup		Other		Total	
Club	Season	Division	Apps	Goals	Apps	Goals	Apps	Goals	Apps	Goals	Apps	Goals
Port Vale	2023–24	League One	22	3	0	0	0	0	4 (Note: Appearance(s) in the EFL Trophy)	0	26	3
Port Vale	2024–25	League Two	3	0	0	0	1	0	1	0	5	0
Port Vale	Total		25	3	0	0	1	0	5	0	31	3
Southampton	2024–25	Premier League	0	0	0	0	0	0	—		0	0
Southampton	2025–26	Championship	0	0	0	0	0	0	—		0	0
Southampton	2026–27	Championship	0	0	0	0	0	0	—		0	0
Southampton	Total		0	0	0	0	0	0	0	0	0	0
Career total			25	3	0	0	1	0	5	0	31	3

== Honours ==
Individual

- Port Vale Young Player of the Year: 2023–24
