= Andrew Buah =

English footballer (born 2006)

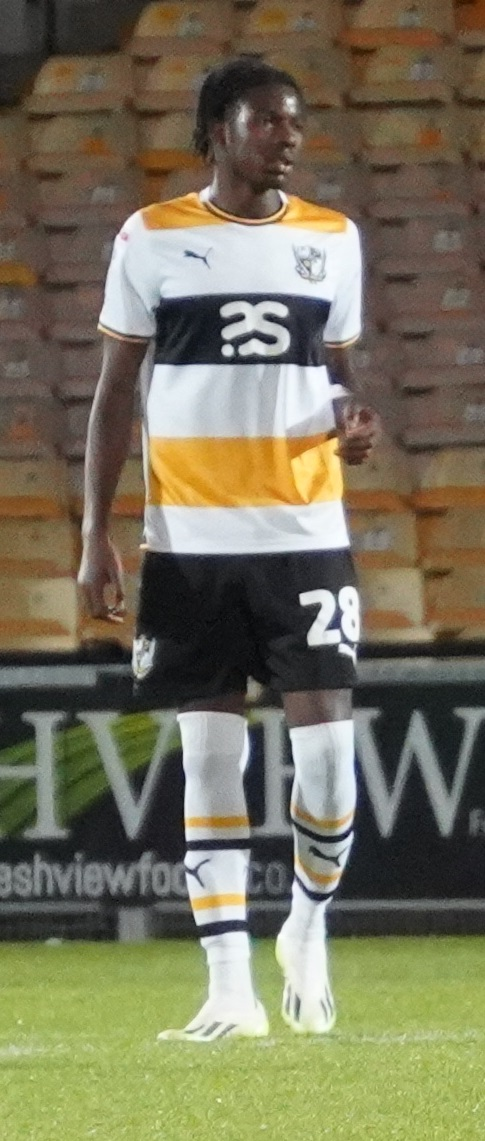
- Buah with Port Vale in 2023

Personal information
- Full name: Andrew Kwamena Adom Buah
- Date of birth: 4 May 2006 (age 20)
- Place of birth: Manchester, England
- Position: Forward

Team information
- Current team: Silsden

Youth career
- 2021–2023: Port Vale

Senior career*
Years	Team	Apps	(Gls)
2023–2025	Port Vale	1	(0)
2023	→ Newcastle Town (loan)	0	(0)
2024	→ Congleton Town (loan)	3	(0)
2024–2025	→ Mickleover (loan)	3	(0)
2025	→ Belper Town (loan)	7	(1)
2025–2026	Connah's Quay Nomads	2	(0)
2026	→ Atherton Collieries (loan)		
2026–	Silsden	0	(0)
- * Club domestic league appearances and goals as of 10:19, 2 November 2025 (UTC)

Andrew Kwamena Adom Buah (born 4 May 2006) is an English footballer who plays as a forward for Northern Premier League Division One East club Silsden.

Buah began his career at Port Vale, from where he had loan spells at Newcastle Town, Congleton Town, Mickleover and Belper Town. He joined Connah's Quay Nomads in September 2025 and was loaned to Atherton Collieries in February 2026. He joined Silsden the following season.

== Career ==
=== Port Vale ===
Buah joined Port Vale after impressing in a trial game at Keele University in 2021. He made his first-team debut on 10 October 2023, coming on as a 73rd-minute substitute for Ethan Chislett in a 1–1 draw with Newcastle United U21 in an EFL Trophy group stage game at Vale Park. The following month, he was played out of position at left-wing-back against Wrexham in his first start in senior football, and manager Andy Crosby said that he should "be really proud of his performance". On 23 December, he joined Northern Premier League Division One West club Newcastle Town on a work experience loan, alongside youth-team teammates Eli Fisher and Daniel Mahaffy. However, he picked up an injury and was not able to feature for the club. He signed a one-year professional contract in July 2024 after manager Darren Moore concluded that he "possesses all of the raw attributes to kick on and become a real asset to our squad".

On 20 September 2024, he returned to the Northern Premier League Division One West on a loan deal with Congleton Town. Vale coach Matt Done said that youth team games had become too easy for Buah after he had transitioned from a winger to the middle of the pitch and that he needed to now make the step up to men's football. On 31 December 2024, he joined Mickleover on loan in the division above. On 22 March 2025, he joined Belper Town of the Northern Premier League Division One East on loan until the end of the 2024–25 season. He was released upon the expiry of his contract at the end of the 2024–25 promotion-winning season.

=== Connah's Quay Nomads ===
On 2 September 2025, Buah signed with Cymru Premier club Connah's Quay Nomads. On 5 February 2026, he joined Northern Premier League Division One West side Atherton Colleries on loan. At the end of the 2025–26 season, it was confirmed he would leave Connah's Quay.

=== Silsden ===
Buah joined Northern Premier League Division One East side Silsden and was named as the club's Player of the Month for September 2026.

== Career statistics ==
As of match played 26 April 2025

Appearances and goals by club, season and competition
Club	Season	League			National cup (Note: Includes FA Cup, Welsh Cup)		League cup (Note: Includes EFL Cup, Welsh League Cup)		Other		Total	
Club	Season	Division	Apps	Goals	Apps	Goals	Apps	Goals	Apps	Goals	Apps	Goals
Port Vale	2023–24	EFL League One	1	0	0	0	0	0	2 (Note: Appearances in the EFL Trophy)	0	3	0
Port Vale	2024–25	EFL League Two	0	0	0	0	1	0	0	0	1	0
Port Vale	Total		1	0	0	0	1	0	2	0	4	0
Newcastle Town (loan)	2023–24	Northern Premier League; Division One West	0	0	0	0	—		0	0	0	0
Congleton Town (loan)	2024–25	Northern Premier League; Division One West	3	0	0	0	—		2 (Note: 1 appearance in the FA Trophy and 1 appearance in the Cheshire Senior Cup)	0	5	0
Mickleover (loan)	2024–25	Northern Premier League; Premier Division	3	0	0	0	—		1 (Note: Appearances in the Derbyshire Senior Cup)	0	4	0
Belper Town (loan)	2024–25	Northern Premier League; Division One East	7	1	—		—		—		7	1
Connah's Quay Nomads	2025–26	Cymru Premier	2	0	1	0	1	0	0	0	4	0
Silsden	2026–27	Northern Premier League; Division One East	0	0	0	0	—		0	0	0	0
Career total			16	1	1	0	2	0	5	0	24	1
