= 2023–24 Port Vale F.C. season =

112th season in existence of Port Vale FC

Port Vale F.C.
2023–24 season
- Owner: Synsol Holdings Limited
- Chair: Carol Shanahan
- Manager: Andy Crosby (until 5 February); Will Ryder, Matt Done & Danny Lloyd (joint-interim managers 6 – 13 February); Darren Moore (from 13 February)
- Stadium: Vale Park
- League One: 23rd (41 points)
- FA Cup: Second Round (eliminated by Stevenage)
- EFL Cup: Quarter-finals (eliminated by Middlesbrough)
- EFL Trophy: Second Round (eliminated by Bolton Wanderers)
- Player of the Year: Ben Garrity
- Top goalscorer: League: Ethan Chislett, Ben Garrity (9); All: Ben Garrity (12)
- Highest home attendance: 12,006 vs. Middlesbrough, 19 December 2023
- Lowest home attendance: 1,197 vs. Newcastle United U21, 10 October 2023
- Average home league attendance: 6,600
- Biggest win: 3–0 vs. Blackpool, 29 December 2023
- Biggest defeat: 0–7 vs. Barnsley, 5 August 2023
Home colours	Away colours	Third colours

The 2023–24 season was Port Vale's 112th season of football in the English Football League (EFL) and their second consecutive season in League One.

Nine permanent and four loan signings were made to replace the eleven players sold or released in the summer transfer window. Only four new arrivals started on the opening day 7–0 defeat at Barnsley, the biggest opening day defeat for any team in the EFL in 60 years. The team recovered confidence immediately, winning ten of the remaining twelve points in August and progressing into the third round of the EFL Cup. The winning run extended to four games in the league, and although Vale progressed into the fourth round of the EFL Cup, they missed the opportunity to go top of the table in mid-September. Injuries then took their toll as Vale took only one point from five league games in October, though they continued their progress in the EFL Cup, beating Mansfield Town to reach the quarter-final stage for the first time in the club's history. However, the club's winless run in the league continued into eleven games. They exited all three cup competitions in December, though they picked up ten from a possible 15 points in the league.

Match abandonment and postponements meant only three games were played in January as the club slipped to just one place above the relegation zone. Loan players were recalled in the transfer window, including key players Ollie Arblaster and Alfie Devine, whilst four new loanees arrived to take their place. Manager Andy Crosby was sacked on 5 February. He was succeeded by Darren Moore, though the poor form continued as two points were gained from seven games in February. Just two points were earned from Moore's first seven games in charge, though the departure of director of football David Flitcroft coincided with back-to-back wins at the end of March to give Vale hope of avoiding relegation. However, just two points were gained from seven matches in April, and Vale were relegated with 41 points.

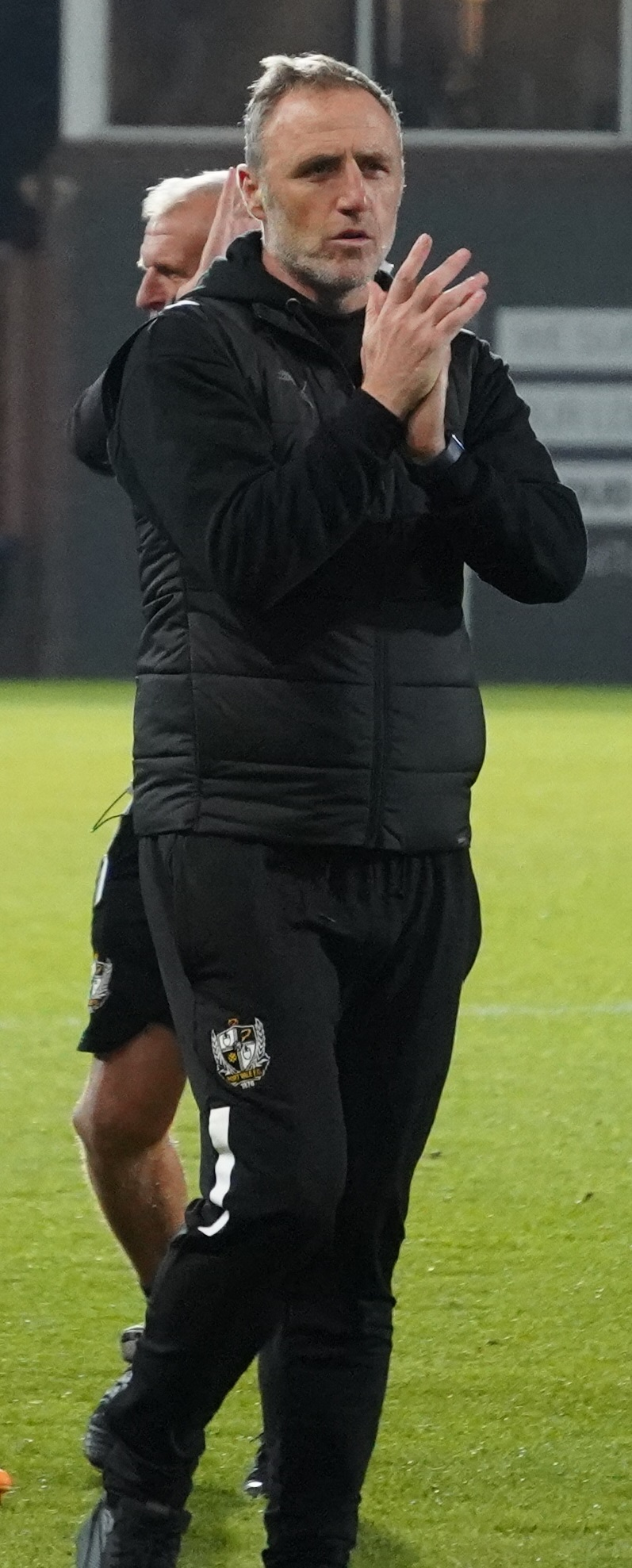
Andy Crosby was sacked in February.

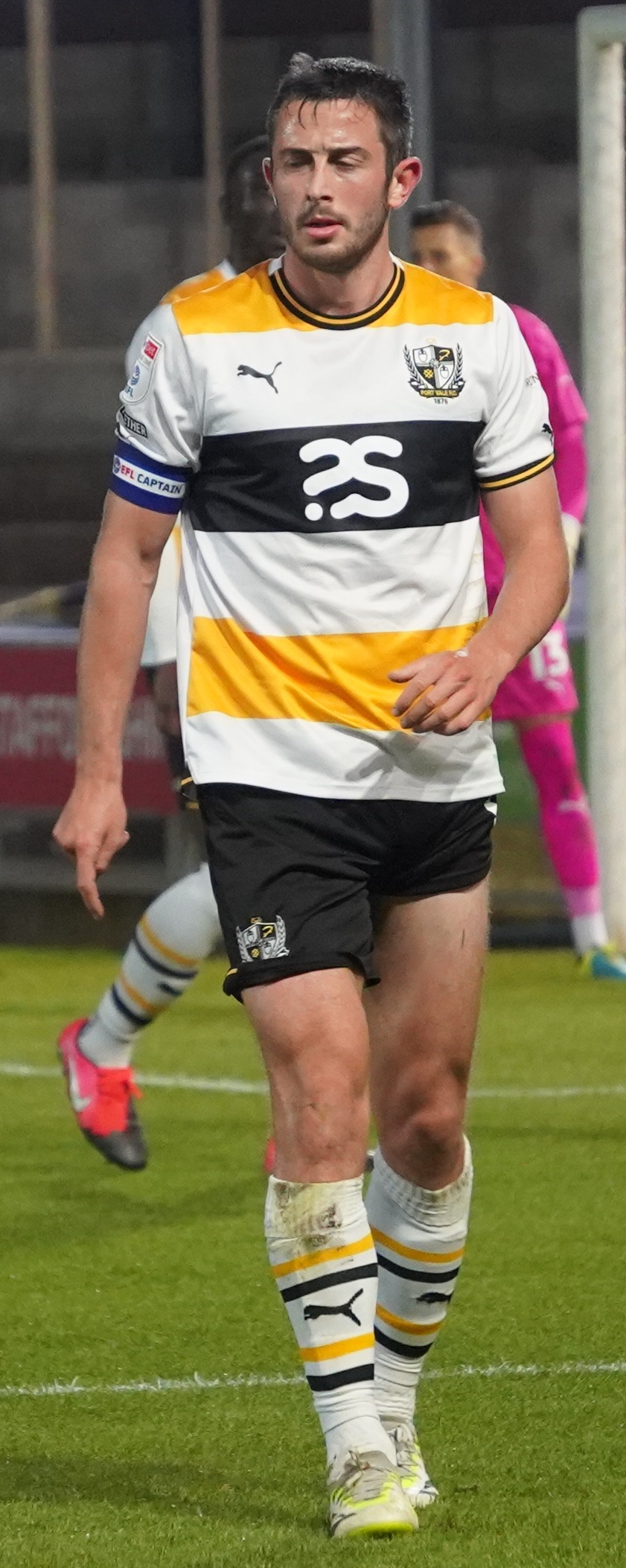
Ben Garrity was the club's Player of the Year.

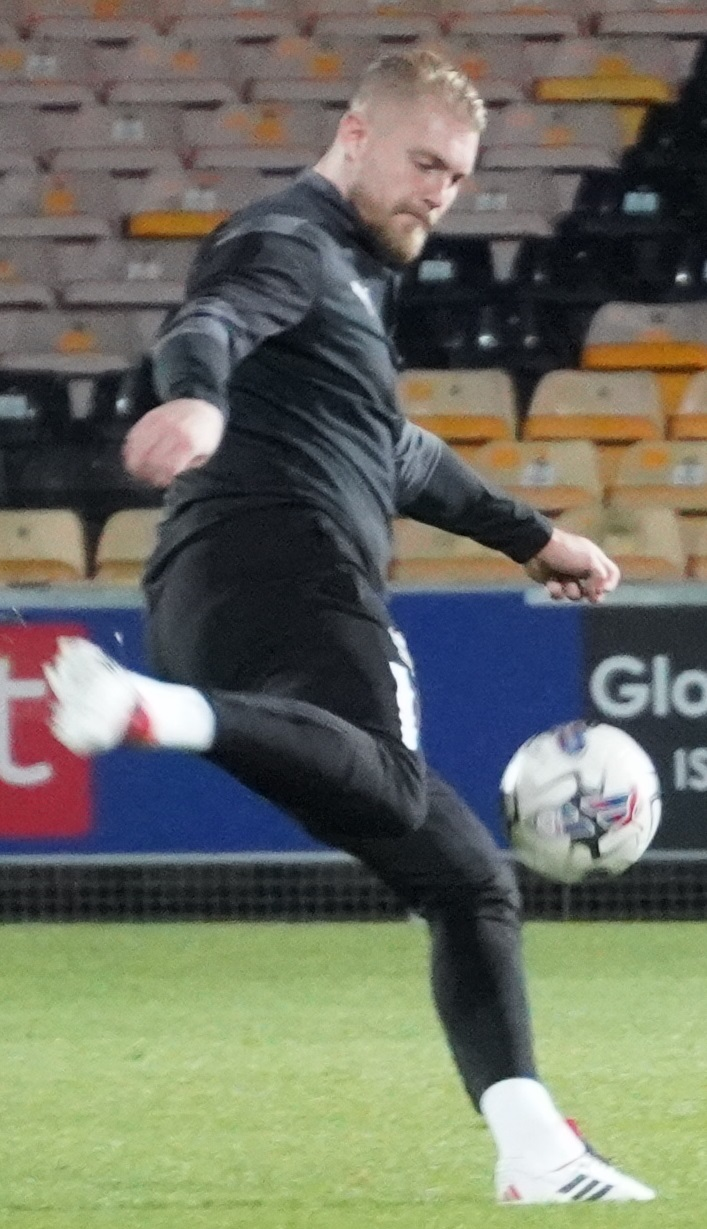
Goalkeeper Connor Ripley played 55 games.

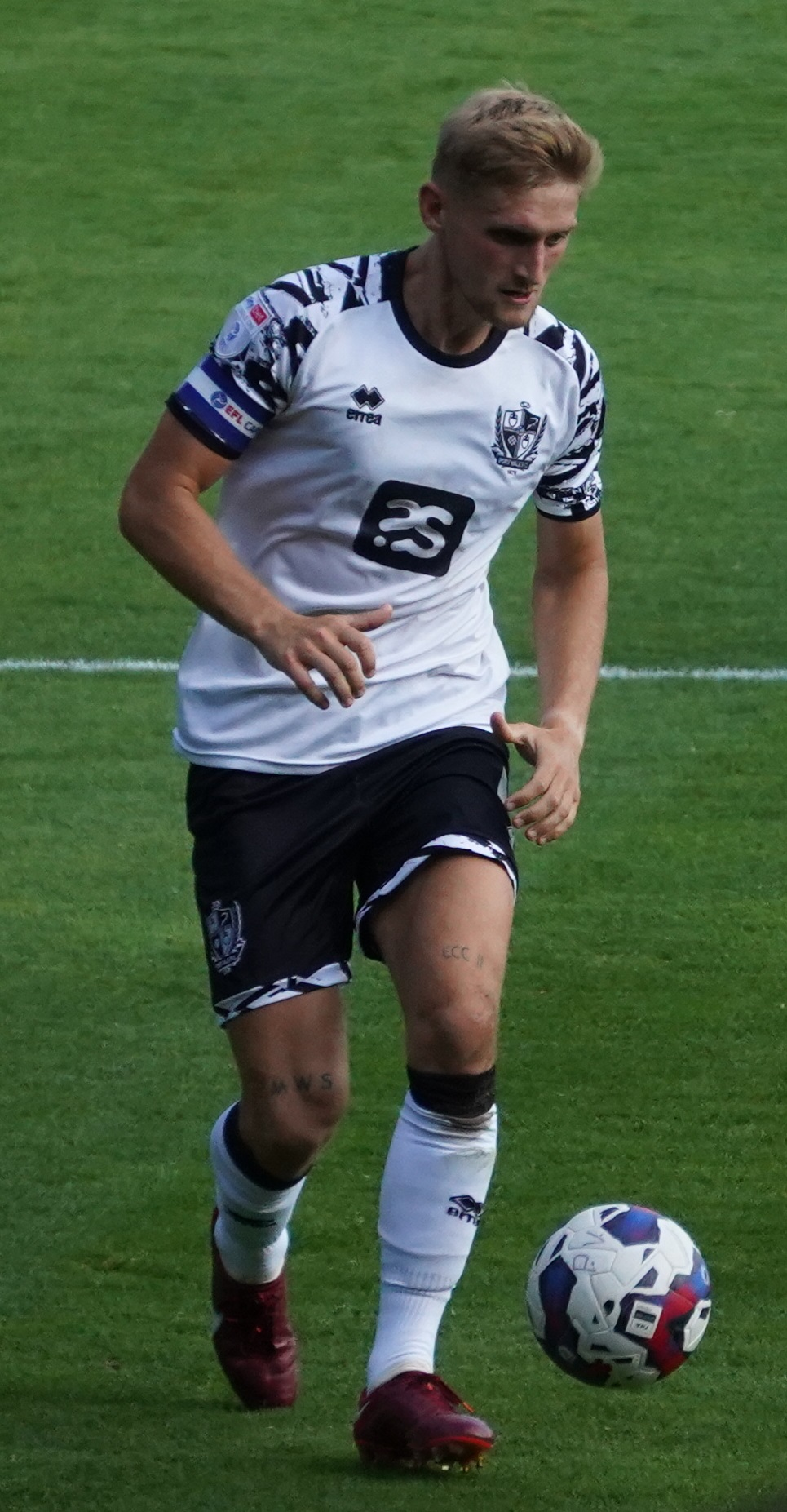
Nathan Smith was the club captain.

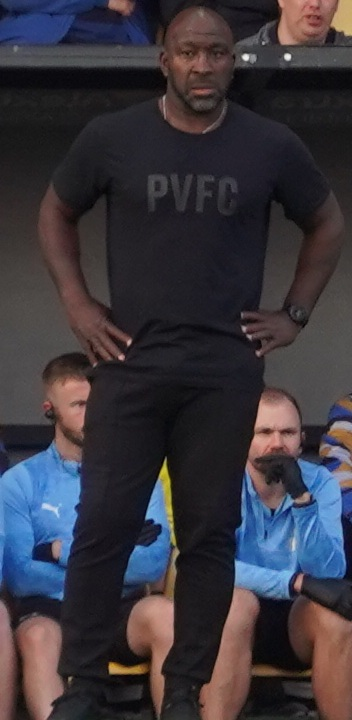
Darren Moore could not save the club from relegation.

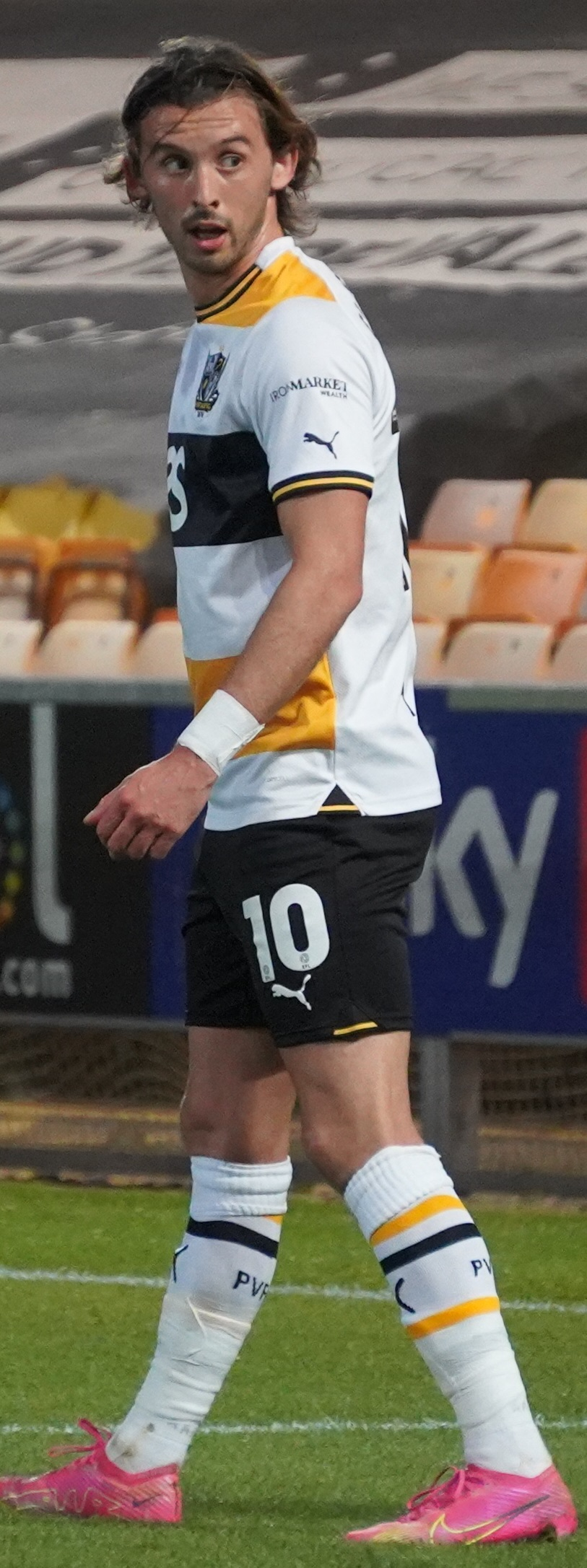
Ethan Chislett scored 11 goals.

== Overview ==
=== EFL League One ===
Port Vale's first signing of the summer was versatile midfielder Tom Sang, who would join on a free transfer from Cardiff City on 1 July, two days after his 24th birthday. A change in the goalkeeping department was then announced, as 30 year-old Connor Ripley joined from Morecambe, whilst Aidan Stone was permitted to leave for League Two side Notts County on a free transfer. Alex Iacovitti, a Scottish 25-year-old defender from Ross County, 28-year-old Plymouth Argyle midfielder Conor Grant, and 34-year-old former Canada international goalkeeper Jayson Leutwiler all arrived before the official start of the season on 1 July. On 2 July, 24-year-old right-back Mitch Clark signed with the club for a record fourth spell following "lengthy negotiations". Ethan Chislett, a 24-year-old South African midfielder from AFC Wimbledon, and 31-year-old Salford City midfielder Jason Lowe were announced the following day. The first loanee to arrive was 22-year-old Crystal Palace defender Kofi Balmer, who had played for manager Andy Crosby in the Northern Ireland under-21 team. A second loanee soon followed in 19-year-old central midfielder Ollie Arblaster from Sheffield United. Crosby appointed a new club captain in 27-year-old stalwart Nathan Smith, with Funso Ojo as vice-captain. In desperate need of a striker, Crosby signed 20 year-old Josh Thomas on a season-long loan from Swansea City, who was yet to make his professional debut but had impressed during pre-season friendlies with his parent club. Two days before the season opener, defender Mal Benning joined Shrewsbury Town on a free transfer. The following day, striker James Wilson, who had left the Vale on 14 May, returned to sign a six-month contract.

Vale opened the season with a 7–0 defeat at Barnsley, with only four new signings in the first XI; Vale started well and were unfortunate to go into half-time two goals down before a second-half collapse allowed Devante Cole to score a hat-trick as Barnsley finished with seven goals. It was the biggest opening day defeat for any team in the EFL since the 1962–63 season over 60 years ago. They recovered to record a 1–0 win over Reading at Vale Park the following week, where Ripley saved a penalty kick from Andy Carroll in the first half, before Ben Garrity scored the game's only goal with a deflected strike on 72 minutes. The team then claimed their first away point with a 0–0 draw at Blackpool, who like Reading had been relegated from the Championship the previous season. Vale picked up their first away victory of the season by beating Charlton Athletic 3–2, coming from a goal down from a dubious penalty after goals from Wilson and Chislett in two second half minutes turned the game around, with Thomas providing Ojo with an assist for a late winner. Recruitment continued with the arrival of Alfie Devine on a season-long from Tottenham Hotspur, who director of football David Flitcroft described as "one of our country's brightest young talents". Devine was on the bench for the home tie with Carlisle United and by the time he made it onto the pitch Wilson had already scored the only goal of the game from the penalty spot. As the transfer window drew to a close, Vale sold Ellis Harrison to Milton Keynes Dons and signed Ryan Loft from Bristol Rovers as his replacement.

Vale beat Oxford United 2–1 in eventful fashion on 2 September. Iacovitti headed the ball home on the end of a Devine free kick to open the scoring, and in addition to assisting the opening goal, the Spurs loanee converted from the penalty spot to earn all three points for Vale in the ninth minute of stoppage time. The home side had both Mark Harris and their goalscorer Greg Leigh sent off for violent conduct and a second bookable offence respectively. Garrity came off the bench to score the only goal of the game in a dominant performance against newly promoted Northampton Town to take Vale into second-place on 16 September. Two days later, 22-year-old defender Jesse Debrah was signed to a two-year contract having left FC Halifax Town in the summer. The re-arranged game at home to struggling Burton Albion allowed Vale the opportunity to go top of the table. However, the visitors came away with a 3–2 win despite Vale dominating in both possession and shots on goal throughout. Garrity had given Vale parity at half-time after Beryly Lubala opened the scoring, but two Burton goals shortly after the break took the game away from Vale as a first senior goal from Arblaster in the dying minutes was not enough to salvage a draw. Garrity went on to give the Vale a 1–0 lead at Cambridge United, though the home side came back to draw 1–1, with Ripley saving a late penalty. A 1–0 defeat at home to Bolton Wanderers followed, with Dion Charles scoring the only goal of the game on a wet Saturday afternoon.

On 3 October, Vale fell to a 3–0 defeat at Bristol Rovers after Debrah was sent off 38 minutes into his first league start following a second yellow card. With the club looking short on attacking options, former loanee Uche Ikpeazu was signed on a short-term deal after returning to England from a spell in Turkey with Konyaspor. However, the team's poor form continued with a 2–0 defeat at league leaders Portsmouth, Colby Bishop scoring both of Pompey's goals; Crosby elected to play without any strikers, preferring Garrity to play up front. The team recovered during the international break. However, Alex Iacovitti, Conor Grant and James Wilson were all confirmed to be long-term absences as all three players had sustained calf injuries. The team returned to action with a 0–0 draw at Stevenage, with Ikpeazu making his first appearance for the Vale in almost eight years. A first-half header from Ephron Mason-Clark gave visitors Peterborough United a 1–0 win, which extended the Vale's run of failing to score to five league games. Former Vale manager Darrell Clarke led bottom club Cheltenham Town to a 2–1 victory at Vale Park that extended the home side's winless run to eight league games, with captain Sean Long scoring two goals to turn the game around following Devine's opener.

On 1 November, promising 19-year-old American Adeteye Gbadahan was signed on a short-term contract; however, the deal was later cancelled after the club revealed that the player's registration was rejected by "the relevant football authorities". Ten days later, Vale almost ended their winless streak in the league before former loanee Olamide Shodipo gave Lincoln City an equalising goal in the third minute of stoppage-time; Garrity had put the Vale ahead in the first-half, before each side were reduced to ten men following dismissals for Arblaster and Paudie O'Connor. Crosby gave a familiar post-match interview in which he praised his team's performances between the penalty areas, but bemoaned a lack of cutting edge in front of goal. A two-week break from league fixtures did not allow for an upturn in results, as Vale fell to a 2–1 defeat at Shrewsbury Town, with Garrity's second half header proving to be just a consolation goal. A second-half goal from Tyreece John-Jules then gave Derby County a 1–0 victory in a closely-contested match at Vale Park.

Vale faced a team in equally poor form in Exeter City on 9 December, played throughout a gale at St James Park. Vale won the game 1–0 thanks to a first-half strike from Arblaster, ending an 11-game winless run in the league. Journalist Mike Baggaley praised the players for their "grit, determination, organisation and bloody-minded refusal to yield". Chislett scored a hat-trick to beat Wigan Athletic 3–2 in what was a dominant performance by the Vale against a strong Latics team that had lost just one of their last nine league games. A late goal rescued a point in a 1–1 draw away at Wycombe Wanderers on 23 December. However, some visiting supporters had already strongly voiced their displeasure with the manager in the second half. On Boxing day, Vale were three goals down at home to Barnsley at half-time, though goals from Chislett and Jack Shorrock provided consolation in what was Vale's sixth defeat win seven home games; Shorrock's goal meant that he set a new record as the club's youngest goalscorer at 16 years and 242 days. The bad news continued as Sheffield United announced that they had recalled Arblaster from his loan spell after two goals and two assists in his 26 appearances in a Vale shirt. The year ended on a positive, however, as Crosby gave league starts to academy products Jack Shorrock and Ben Lomax as the Vale recorded a 3–0 home win over Blackpool.

The new year opened with a 2–1 defeat at bottom club Carlisle United, who came from a goal down with two goals in the match's final ten minutes. Vale then came from a goal behind three times to earn a point at home to Charlton Athletic, with goals from Chislett, Ikpeazu and Gavin Massey. Business in the January transfer window commenced on 9 January with the loan signing of Brighton & Hove Albion midfielder Jensen Weir until the end of the season, whilst former captain Tom Conlon was permitted to leave on a permanent transfer to Oldham Athletic. The match at Reading on 13 January was abandoned after home supporters invaded and occupied the pitch in protest against the ownership of Dai Yongge. Three days later, Rhys Williams was brought in on loan from Liverpool, replacing the recalled Kofi Balmer. Alfie Devine was also recalled by his parent club on 17 January, before being sent back out on loan to Championship side Plymouth Argyle for the remainder of the season. A second successive game was then called off as a frozen Vale Park pitch caused the postponement of the fixture with Wycombe Wanderers. The signings continued on 23 January with the arrival of highly rated midfielder Dan Gore on loan from Manchester United. Weir and Gore made their debuts in a 1–0 home defeat to Portsmouth, a game which was decided by a controversial late penalty; a Vale supporter ran onto the pitch to accost the referee for the penalty decision and forced the referee to evacuate the pitch. On transfer deadline day, Williams was recalled to Liverpool due to an ongoing injury problem, whilst winger Alex Mighten joined on loan from Nottingham Forest. Lewis Cass was allowed to join Stockport County on loan, which gave room for Polish centre-back Kacper Łopata to come in from Barnsley. No striker was signed, however, despite Flitcroft stating that was the club's main aim even before Ikpeazu picked up a long-term injury.

Vale suffered a 3–0 defeat at bottom-club Fleetwood Town on 3 February. Andy Crosby was sacked two days later. Academy coaches Will Ryder, Matt Done and Danny Lloyd were appointed as interim managers as the search for a new manager began. The trio oversaw a 1–0 home loss to Leyton Orient that saw Vale fall into the relegation zone for the first time since the opening day as fans from the lowest home crowd in over four years chanted against Flitcroft. Vale threw away a half-time lead at home to Stevenage but earned a 2–2 draw with a stoppage-time penalty. Darren Moore was named as Crosby's successor on 13 February when he signed a five-and-a-half-year contract which he said was "a testament to the long-term vision of the club". His first game in charge saw the Vale twice throw away a lead to lose 3–2 at relegation-rivals Cheltenham Town, who included former Valiants Darrell Clarke (manager), Matty Taylor (goalscorer), George Lloyd and Tom Pett in their ranks. The rearranged fixture at Reading ended in a 2–0 defeat after Moore switched formation to a back four. A 2–0 home defeat to Lincoln City followed, with Vale showing little threat after the visitors capitalised off a calamitous error by Smith in the second minute. The team had the chance to take three points at home to Fleetwood Town three days later, but lost a two-goal lead after Jayden Stockley scored two goals past the 88th-minute mark with second-bottom Fleetwood having 70% possession and 20 shots at goal.

A 3–0 defeat at Derby County left the Vale six points from safety in a game where the only available striker for Moore was 17-year-old Dipepa after the club passed up on the opportunity to sign a free-agent forward. A 2–1 home defeat to Shrewsbury Town took the Vale to second-from-bottom, with one small positive being a first EFL goal for Dipepa. They gained a point and a clean sheet at Leyton Orient. The defeats continued with a 2–0 home loss to Oxford United. Moore achieved his first win as Vale manager on 23 March, as Loft scored his first league goal for the club to secure a 1–0 victory at Burton Albion. Vale secured back-to-back victories with a 2–0 home win over Bristol Rovers, with 17-year-old Dipepa scoring the second goal after a mazey run.

Vale were beaten 2–0 at Northampton Town, though other results went in their favour to keep them just one point from escaping relegation. A hard-earned point in a 0–0 draw at Wigan Athletic took Vale out of the relegation zone with five games left to play. They then travelled to 2024 EFL Trophy final winners Peterborough United and were returned to the relegation zone with a 3–0 defeat. New signing, New Zealand international left-back Deklan Wynne, did not feature in the game. The Vale then took a two-goal lead against Exeter City into half-time, only to concede four goals in the second half to leave them three points into the relegation zone with an inferior goal difference. Journalist Mike Baggaley reported as "arguably the best half of the season" followed by "the worst half of the season" as the "confidence, aggression and intent" shown in the first 45 minutes was entirely lacking in the second half. A 2–1 home defeat to Wycombe Wanderers, with Vale conceding both early and late in the game, meant that yet another opportunity to escape the relegation zone was squandered. The defeat equalled a club record for home league defeats in a season (13). Relegation was confirmed in the penultimate match of the season away at Bolton Wanderers, with former Stoke striker Cameron Jerome scoring Bolton's second goal in a 2–0 victory. The season ended with a 0–0 draw at home to Cambridge United, who secure their safety with a point as results elsewhere went in their favour.

The 22 points from 23 home fixtures was the lowest total since the 30-game 1892–93 season (adjusted to three points for a win before 1981). No Vale striker scored more than James Wilson's four goals, which was the lowest best score since the 1892–93 season. Failing to score in 25 games (in all competitions) was a new club record. With 16 players contracted until at least the following season, the club released three of the five out-of-contract players: Jayson Leutwiler, Gavin Massey and James Wilson. Uche Ikpeazu was offered a new contract but instead opted to sign with St Johnstone. Lewis Cass was later revealed to be leaving upon the expiry of his contract.

=== Finances ===
The playing budget for the season was around 16th to 18th in the division. The club began a new kit deal with Puma, and designer Patrick Shanahan revealed the away kit by having one sent into space by attaching it to a balloon. The defeat in the second round of the FA Cup caused the club to miss out on a guaranteed £107,000 payout, with potentially up to £250,000 of revenue lost, as well as the opportunity to reach the fourth round by defeating National League South team Maidstone United. Matt Hancock was appointed as the club's chief executive in January following a 12-month spell as the club's community and social responsibility director. He reported that the club were only able to post a competitive League One budget due to the financial support of the Shanahan family. The club appointed Robbie Williams as a club president in January, though denied reports that he was fronting a consortium to buy the club. With fan opinion turning hostile towards Flitcroft by February, Shanahan published a lengthy open letter on the club website defending Flitcroft and his achievements as Port Vale's director of football. However, Flitcroft left the club on 21 March. He was not replaced as the club looked to manager Darren Moore to take the lead on recruitment. Vale paid a total of £122,468 in agent fees during the two transfer windows. The average attendance of 6,600 made them the 18th best-supported club in the division. However, unlike other clubs, this figure only includes people who attended rather than tickets sold or gifted away. The club lost £3.8 million, adding to the loans by the Shanahans to the club to a total of almost £15 million.

=== Cup competitions ===
Vale had a home tie with Burton Albion (League One) in the first round of the FA Cup, which finished in a 0–0 draw after Smith was sent off after just 18 minutes for bringing down Mark Helm. Crosby said his team controlled the game regardless of the man disadvantage. However, opposition manager Dino Maamria bemoaned a late goal that had been ruled out for offside. The replay came during an international break where Vale were without three of their four loanees, a blight of injuries also meant that a total of ten first-team players were unavailable for selection. Goals from Gavin Massey and Lewis Cass gave the Valiants a 2–0 victory in a dominant performance against a strong Brewers side. A 1–1 draw at Stevenage (League One) in extremely foggy conditions meant that Vale had to face another replay in the second round; Crosby had selected a first XI without any strikers due to Ikpeazu and Loft thus far failing to score a goal between them. Two goals from Garrity gave Vale a two-goal lead in the replay, however Stevenage pulled one back on 81 minutes and equalised in the sixth minute of stoppage time; Loft the put Vale ahead in extra-time, only for Stevenage to equalise again. Garrity and Loft missed their penalties in the resulting shoot-out, leaving Vale to exit the competition in the second round. Crosby was criticised for his substitutions and reliance on sports science during the game, but defended his decisions by saying he was not prepared to risk injuring his players. The attendance of 2,073 was Vale's lowest-ever for an FA Cup tie.

Vale recovered from the heavy opening day league defeat to Barnsley by beating Fleetwood Town (League One) 3–2 in the first round of the EFL Cup; Chislett scored a brace, and Thomas scored his first senior goal as Vale twice came from a goal down. Nearby Crewe Alexandra (League Two) were the visitors to Vale Park in the second round, and after neither side could score a goal in ninety minutes, Vale went through 2–0 on penalties after Crewe missed all four of their kicks. They advanced past Sutton United (League Two) thanks to goals from Thomas and Ojo, securing a place in the fourth round of the competition for the first time since 2006–07. A 1–0 win at Mansfield Town (League Two) took the Vale into the quarter-finals of the EFL Cup for the first time in the club's history, with Devine's strike from outside the area being enough to settle the tie. They were knocked out at the quarter-finals with a disappointing 3–0 defeat at home to Middlesbrough (Championship) in front of the biggest crowd at Vale Park in ten years.

The Group stage draw for the EFL Trophy saw Vale matched with Crewe Alexandra (League Two), Wrexham (League Two) and Newcastle United U21. They recorded a 1–0 home win over Crewe in Vale's opening fixture of the competition thanks to a first-half strike from Garrity, in a game that also saw first senior appearances for academy prospects Baylee Dipepa and Liam Brazier. Debrah's first goal for the club seemed to have given Vale another 1–0 home win in the competition until Newcastle United U21 equalised in the 89th-minute, though Vale went on to win the penalty shoot-out 3–2 to secure qualification into the next round with a game to spare. The final game of the group stage took place at the Racecourse Ground, a fixture that saw first senior starts for young academy prospects Andrew Buah and Ben Lomax, and first senior appearances for Daniel Mahaffy and Logan Cousins; a well-worked move was put away at close range by Thomas to open the scoring in the first half, but two second-half goals from Paul Mullin and James McClean sealed all three points for Wrexham against a young Vale side. Bolton Wanderers (League One) became the first club to knock the Vale out of a cup competition in the 2023–24 season, as they inflicted a 2–0 defeat upon them on 5 December despite Leutwiler saving a late penalty.

== Results ==
=== Pre-season ===
Win Draw Loss Fixtures

11 July 2023 Friendly	Burnley	3–1	Port Vale	Gawthorpe Hall
14:00 BST	Brownhill; Westley	Report	Harrison 21'	Stadium: Gawthorpe Training Ground; Attendance: 0 (Behind closed doors)

15 July 2023 Friendly	Kidsgrove Athletic	0–2	Port Vale	Kidsgrove
13:30 BST		Report	Plant 37'; Sang 60'	Stadium: Hollinwood Road

15 July 2023 Friendly	Newcastle Town	0–0	Port Vale	Newcastle-under-Lyme
17:00 BST		Report		Stadium: Lyme Valley Stadium

21 July 2023 Friendly	Port Vale	1–1^{1}	Grimsby Town	Alicante
10:00 CEST	Garrity	Report	Wilson	Stadium: Real Club de Golf Campoamor Resort; Attendance: 60 (Port Vale supporters)

29 July 2023 Friendly	Doncaster Rovers	1–0	Port Vale	Doncaster
15:00 BST	Broadbent 69'	Report		Stadium: Eco-Power Stadium; Attendance: 1,730

- Game incorporated four thirty-minute quarters instead of using the traditional clock.

=== EFL League One ===
==== League table ====
Pos	Team	Pld	W	D	L	GF	GA	GD	Pts	Promotion, qualification or relegation
19	Shrewsbury Town	46	13	9	24	35	67	−32	48	
20	Burton Albion	46	12	10	24	39	67	−28	46	
21	Cheltenham Town (R)	46	12	8	26	41	65	−24	44	Relegation to EFL League Two
22	Fleetwood Town (R)	46	10	13	23	49	72	−23	43	Relegation to EFL League Two
23	Port Vale (R)	46	10	11	25	41	74	−33	41	Relegation to EFL League Two
24	Carlisle United (R)	46	7	9	30	41	81	−40	30	Relegation to EFL League Two

Source: EFL Official Website
Rules for classification: 1) Points; 2) Goal difference; 3) Number of goals scored; 4) Head-to-head results; 5) Wins; 6) Away goals; 7) Penalty points (sec 9.5); 8) 12-point sending off offences
(R) Relegated

==== Results by round ====
Round	1	2	3	4	5	6	8	7^{1}	9	10	11	1	14	15	16	17	19	20	21	22	23	24	25	26	27	30	31	18^{3}	32	34	28^{4}	35	13^{2}	36	37	38	39	40	41	42	43	33^{6}	44	29^{5}	45	46
Ground	A	H	A	A	H	A	H	H	A	H	A	A	A	H	H	A	A	H	A	H	A	H	H	A	H	H	A	H	H	A	A	H	H	A	H	A	H	A	H	A	A	A	H	H	A	H
Result	L	W	D	W	W	W	W	L	D	L	L	L	D	L	L	D	L	L	W	W	D	L	W	L	D	L	L	L	D	L	L	L	D	L	L	D	L	W	W	L	D	L	L	L	L	D
Position	23	14	13	9	6	4	2	4	4	6	9	11	14	14	16	17	19	19	17	15	15	16	14	15	14	20	20	21	21	22	22	22	22	22	23	23	23	21	21	21	20	21	21	21	23	23
Points	0	3	4	7	10	13	16	16	17	17	17	17	18	18	18	19	19	19	22	25	26	26	29	29	30	30	30	30	31	31	31	31	32	32	32	33	33	36	39	39	40	40	40	40	40	41

Updated to match(es) played on 27 April 2024. Source: Soccerway
A = Away; H = Home; W = Win; D = Draw; L = Loss; P = postponed
Notes:
- ^{1} Matchday 7 (vs Burton Albion) was postponed due to international call-ups.
- ^{2} Matchday 13 (vs Fleetwood Town) was postponed due to international call-ups.
- ^{3} Matchday 18 (vs Leyton Orient) was postponed due to international call-ups.
- ^{4} Matchday 28 (vs Reading) was abandoned due to home fans protest on the pitch.
- ^{5} Matchday 29 (vs Wycombe Wanderers) was postponed due to a frozen pitch.
- ^{6} Matchday 33 (vs Peterborough United) was postponed due to a waterlogged pitch.

==== Matches ====
Win Draw Loss Fixtures

5 August 2023 1	Barnsley	7–0	Port Vale	Barnsley
15:00 BST	Cole 23', 47', 53'; Jones 45' (og.); Kitching 60'; Russell 64'; Dallas 90+6'	Report		Stadium: Oakwell; Attendance: 13,796; Referee: David Rock; Assistant referees: Daniel Woodward, Graeme Fyvie; Fourth official: Steve Durnall

12 August 2023 2	Port Vale	1–0	Reading	Burslem
15:00 BST	Garrity 72'	Report		Stadium: Vale Park; Attendance: 8,789; Referee: Peter Wright; Assistant referees: Dumitru-Ravel Cheosiaua, Alex Gray; Fourth official: Matthew Sowerby

15 August 2023 3	Blackpool	0–0	Port Vale	Blackpool
19:45 BST		Report		Stadium: Bloomfield Road; Attendance: 11,416; Referee: Ross Joyce; Assistant referees: Mark Cunliffe, Richard Wigglesworth; Fourth official: Martin Woods

19 August 2023 4	Charlton Athletic	2–3	Port Vale	Charlton, London
15:00 BST	May 10' (pen.); Kanu 71'	Report	Wilson 55'; Chislett 56'; Ojo 87'	Stadium: The Valley; Attendance: 11,912; Referee: Sunny Singh Gill; Assistant referees: Joseph Stokes, Marvyn Amphlett; Fourth official: Damith Bandara

26 August 2023 5	Port Vale	1–0	Carlisle United	Burslem
15:00 BST	Wilson 50' (pen.)	Report		Stadium: Vale Park; Attendance: 6,997; Referee: Tom Reeves; Assistant referees: Stephen Wade, Mark Jones; Fourth official: Christopher Ward

2 September 2023 6	Oxford United	1–2	Port Vale	Oxford
15:00 BST	Leigh 90+3'	Report	Iacovitti 74'; Devine 90+9' (pen.)	Stadium: Kassam Stadium; Attendance: 8,835; Referee: Sam Purkiss; Assistant referees: Adam Ricketts, Jack Clench; Fourth official: Steven Plane

16 September 2023 8	Port Vale	1–0	Northampton Town	Burslem
15:00 BST	Garrity 84'	Report		Stadium: Vale Park; Attendance: 7,532; Referee: Scott Oldham; Assistant referees: Daniel Jarvis, Joe Simpson; Fourth official: Ross Joyce

19 September 2023 7	Port Vale	2–3	Burton Albion	Burslem
19:45 BST	Garrity 40'; Arblaster 86'		Lubala 11'; Seddon 51'; Baah 61'	Stadium: Vale Park; Attendance: 5,993; Referee: Ben Toner; Assistant referees: Jake Topp, Declan O'Shea; Fourth official: Karl Buckley
Note: Fixture was originally scheduled for 9 September but was postponed due to international call-ups.

23 September 2023 9	Cambridge United	1–1	Port Vale	Cambridge
15:00 BST	Okenabirhie 66'	Report	Garrity 20'	Stadium: Abbey Stadium; Attendance: 6,905; Referee: Christopher Pollard; Assistant referees: David Harrison, Daniel Bonneywell; Fourth official: Daniel Cook

30 September 2023 10	Port Vale	0–1	Bolton Wanderers	Burslem
15:00 BST		Report	Charles 43'	Stadium: Vale Park; Attendance: 10,457; Referee: Declan Bourne; Assistant referees: Steve Durnall, Lewis Raper; Fourth official: Mark Jones

3 October 2023 11	Bristol Rovers	3–0	Port Vale	Bristol
19:45 BST	McCormick 25'; Hunt 45+2'; Brown 85'	Report		Stadium: Memorial Stadium; Attendance: 7,364; Referee: Ben Speedie; Assistant referees: Kevin Morris, Steven Plane; Fourth official: Richie Watkins

7 October 2023 12	Portsmouth	2–0	Port Vale	Portsmouth
15:00 BST	Bishop 53', 58' (pen.)	Report		Stadium: Fratton Park; Attendance: 17,847; Referee: Bobby Madley; Assistant referees: Blake Antrobus, Hristo Karaivanov; Fourth official: Matthew Corlett

21 October 2023 14	Stevenage	0–0	Port Vale	Stevenage
15:00 BST		Report		Stadium: Broadhall Way; Attendance: 4,047; Referee: Scott Jackson; Assistant referees: Paul Evans, Adam Ricketts; Fourth official: Andrew Bennett

24 October 2023 15	Port Vale	0–1	Peterborough United	Burslem
19:45 BST		Report	Mason-Clark 14'	Stadium: Vale Park; Attendance: 5,299; Referee: Marc Edwards; Assistant referees: Richard Wigglesworth, Grant Taylor; Fourth official: Jamie O'Connor

28 October 2023 16	Port Vale	1–2	Cheltenham Town	Burslem
15:00 BST	Devine 32'	Report	Long 42', 66'	Stadium: Vale Park; Attendance: 6,471; Referee: Matthew Corlett; Assistant referees: Joe Simpson, Callum Jones; Fourth official: Jack Forder

11 November 2023 17	Lincoln City	1–1	Port Vale	Lincoln
15:00 GMT	Shodipo 90+3'	Report	Garrity 34'	Stadium: Sincil Bank; Attendance: 7,751; Referee: Craig Hicks; Assistant referees: Matthew Sowerby, Stephen Wade; Fourth official: Conor Brown

25 November 2023 19	Shrewsbury Town	2–1	Port Vale	Shrewsbury
15:00 GMT	Mata 28'; Udoh 48'	Report	Garrity 57'	Stadium: New Meadow; Attendance: 7,429; Referee: Scott Tallis; Assistant referees: Daniel Flynn, Jack Clench; Fourth official: Kevin Morris

28 November 2023 20	Port Vale	0–1	Derby County	Burslem
19:45 GMT		Report	John-Jules 77'	Stadium: Vale Park; Attendance: 8,062; Referee: Paul Howard; Fourth official: Grant Taylor

9 December 2023 21	Exeter City	0–1	Port Vale	Exeter
15:00 GMT		Report	Arblaster 29'	Stadium: St James Park; Attendance: 6,121; Referee: Neil Hair; Fourth official: Adam Ricketts

16 December 2023 22	Port Vale	3–2	Wigan Athletic	Burslem
15:00 GMT	Chislett 21', 43', 83'	Report	Sze 63'; Wyke 77'	Stadium: Vale Park; Attendance: 6,701; Referee: Marc Edwards; Fourth official: Ollie Williams

23 December 2023 23	Wycombe Wanderers	1–1	Port Vale	High Wycombe
15:00 GMT	Sadlier 51'	Report	Garrity 90'	Stadium: Adams Park; Attendance: 4,696; Referee: Ben Atkinson; Fourth official: Samuel Fudge

26 December 2023 24	Port Vale	2–3	Barnsley	Burslem
15:00 GMT	Chislett 72'; Shorrock 90+3'	Report	Phillips 17'; McAtee 32', 37'	Stadium: Vale Park; Attendance: 8,053; Referee: Scott Oldham; Fourth official: Conor Brown

29 December 2023 25	Port Vale	3–0	Blackpool	Burslem
19:45 GMT	Garrity 39'; Wilson 57'; Smith 80'	Report		Stadium: Vale Park; Attendance: 6,203; Referee: Steve Martin; Fourth official: Matthew Smith

1 January 2024 26	Carlisle United	2–1	Port Vale	Carlisle
15:00 GMT	Gibson 80' (pen.); Mellish 90+3'	Report	Garrity 49'	Stadium: Brunton Park; Attendance: 7,758; Referee: Thomas Kirk; Fourth official: Ben Speedie

6 January 2024 27	Port Vale	3–3	Charlton Athletic	Burslem
15:00 GMT	Chislett 45' (pen.); Ikpeazu 63'; Massey 90+2'	Report	Blackett-Taylor 27'; Kanu 59'; Campbell 83'	Stadium: Vale Park; Attendance: 5,993; Referee: Martin Coy; Fourth official: Jacob Lehane

27 January 2024 30	Port Vale	0–1	Portsmouth	Burslem
15:00 GMT		Report	Bishop 88' (pen.)	Stadium: Vale Park; Attendance: 8,068; Referee: Craig Hicks; Fourth official: Matthew Corlett

3 February 2024 31	Fleetwood Town	3–0	Port Vale	Fleetwood
15:00 GMT	Stockley 8'; Coughlan 65'; Broom 90+4'	Report		Stadium: Highbury Stadium; Attendance: 3,751; Referee: Peter Wright; Fourth official: Lewis Raper

6 February 2024 18	Port Vale	0–1	Leyton Orient	Burslem
19:45 GMT		Report	El Mizouni 60'	Stadium: Vale Park; Attendance: 4,117; Referee: Scott Jackson; Fourth official: Mark Cunliffe
Note: Fixture was originally scheduled for 18 November but was postponed due to international call-ups.

10 February 2024 32	Port Vale	2–2	Stevenage	Burslem
15:00 GMT	Vancooten 6' (og.); Ojo 90+8' (pen.)	Report	Reid 52'; Vancooten 58'	Stadium: Vale Park; Attendance: 5,296; Referee: Scott Tallis; Fourth official: Christopher Husband

17 February 2024 34	Cheltenham Town	3–2	Port Vale	Cheltenham
15:00 GMT	Taylor 45+2'; Shepherd 69'; Ferry 73'	Report	Smith 25'; Davies 65' (og.)	Stadium: Whaddon Road; Attendance: 5,600; Referee: Sam Purkiss; Fourth official: Richard Morris

20 February 2024 28	Reading	2–0	Port Vale	Reading
15:00 GMT	Wing 76'; Knibbs 83'	Report		Stadium: Madejski Stadium; Attendance: 10,004; Referee: Ross Joyce
Note: Fixture was originally scheduled for 13 January, but the original match was abandoned after home fans invaded the pitch in protest against their owner Dai Yongge.

24 February 2024 35	Port Vale	0–2	Lincoln City	Burslem
15:00 GMT		Report	Taylor 2'; Hackett-Fairchild 90+3'	Stadium: Vale Park; Attendance: 7,148; Referee: James Bell; Fourth official: Lee Freeman

27 February 2024 13	Port Vale	2–2	Fleetwood Town	Burslem
19:45 GMT	Weir 18'; Chislett 43'	Report	Stockley 88', 90+3'	Stadium: Vale Park; Attendance: 4,358; Referee: Darren Drysdale; Fourth official: Thomas Staten
Note: Fixture was originally scheduled for 14 October but was postponed due to international call-ups.

2 March 2024 36	Derby County	3–0	Port Vale	Derby
15:00 GMT	Łopata 5' (og.); Gayle 44'; Sibley 58'	Report		Stadium: Pride Park Stadium; Attendance: 27,392; Referee: Sunny Singh Gill; Fourth official: Steven Copeland

9 March 2024 37	Port Vale	1–2	Shrewsbury Town	Burslem
15:00 GMT	Dipepa 69'	Report	Udoh 6'; Bloxham 53'	Stadium: Vale Park; Attendance: 6,900; Referee: Ben Toner; Fourth official: Kenwyn Hughes

12 March 2024 38	Leyton Orient	0–0	Port Vale	Leyton, London
19:45 GMT		Report		Stadium: Brisbane Road; Attendance: 7,326; Referee: Gavin Ward; Fourth official: Daniel Middleton

16 March 2024 39	Port Vale	0–2	Oxford United	Burslem
15:00 GMT		Report	Brown 16'; Murphy 49'	Stadium: Vale Park; Attendance: 5,627; Referee: Jeremy Simpson; Fourth official: Scott Jackson

23 March 2024 40	Burton Albion	0–1	Port Vale	Burton upon Trent
15:00 GMT		Report	Loft 83'	Stadium: Pirelli Stadium; Attendance: 3,757; Referee: David Rock; Fourth official: Richard Wigglesworth

29 March 2024 41	Port Vale	2–0	Bristol Rovers	Burslem
15:00 GMT	Garrity 42'; Dipepa 52'	Report		Stadium: Vale Park; Attendance: 6,637; Referee: Scott Oldham; Fourth official: Christopher Husband

1 April 2024 42	Northampton Town	2–0	Port Vale	Northampton
15:00 BST	Pinnock 34'; McWilliams 90+4'	Report		Stadium: Sixfields Stadium; Attendance: 6,739; Referee: Lee Swabey; Fourth official: Sam Purkiss

6 April 2024 43	Wigan Athletic	0–0	Port Vale	Wigan
15:00 BST		Report		Stadium: DW Stadium; Attendance: 12,572; Referee: Paul Howard; Fourth official: Jamie O'Connor

10 April 2024 33	Peterborough United	3–0	Port Vale	Peterborough
19:45 GMT	Randall 45+2'; Burrows 56' (pen.); Iacovitti 86' (og.)	Report		Stadium: London Road Stadium; Attendance: 7,770; Referee: Stephen Martin; Fourth official: Daniel Cook
Note: Fixture was originally scheduled for 13 February but was postponed due to a waterlogged pitch.

13 April 2024 44	Port Vale	2–4	Exeter City	Burslem
15:00 BST	Chislett 31'; Dipepa 40'	Report	Alli 57', 89'; Jules 67'; Harris 79'	Stadium: Vale Park; Attendance: 6,686; Referee: Marc Edwards; Fourth official: Daniel Jarvis

16 April 2024 29	Port Vale	1–2	Wycombe Wanderers	Burslem
19:45 GMT	Chislett 47'	Report	Wheeler 4'; Lonwijk 86'	Stadium: Vale Park; Attendance: 4,029; Referee: John Busby; Fourth official: Scott Jackson
Note: Fixture was originally scheduled for 13 February but was postponed due to a frozen pitch.

20 April 2024 45	Bolton Wanderers	2–0	Port Vale	Horwich
15:00 BST	Collins 72'; Jerome 90+3'	Report		Stadium: Toughsheet Community Stadium; Attendance: 22,311; Referee: Charles Breakspear; Fourth official: Matthew Corlett

27 April 2024 46	Port Vale	0–0	Cambridge United	Burslem
12:30 BST		Report		Stadium: Vale Park; Attendance: 6,378; Referee: Ross Joyce; Fourth official: Rob Ellis

=== FA Cup ===
Win Draw Loss Fixtures

4 November 2023 R1	Port Vale	0–0	Burton Albion	Burslem
15:00 GMT		Report		Stadium: Vale Park; Attendance: 4,245; Referee: Simon Mather; Assistant referees: Simon Shaw, Dumitru-Ravel Cheosiaua; Fourth official: Jonathan Maskrey

14 November 2023 Replay	Burton Albion	0–2	Port Vale	Burton upon Trent
19:45 GMT		Report	Massey 31'; Cass 82'	Stadium: Pirelli Stadium; Attendance: 2,533; Referee: Adam Herczeg; Assistant referees: Anthony Da Costa, Alan Clayton; Fourth official: Harry Jones

2 December 2023 R2	Stevenage	1–1	Port Vale	Stevenage
15:00 GMT	Reid 69'	Report	Ojo 76' (pen.)	Stadium: Broadhall Way; Attendance: 2,491; Referee: Tom Reeves; Fourth official: Oliver Mackey

12 December 2023 Replay	Port Vale	3–3 (a.e.t.) (3–4 p)	Stevenage	Burslem
19:45 GMT	Garrity 6', 55'; Loft 114'	Report	White 81'; Hemmings 90+6'; Thompson 119'	Stadium: Vale Park; Attendance: 2,073; Referee: Tom Nield; Fourth official: Lee Hible
	Penalties
	Ojo (penalty scored); Garrity (penalty missed); Lowe (penalty scored); Sang (penalty scored); Loft (penalty missed)		Reid (penalty scored); Hemmings (penalty scored); White (penalty scored); Thompson (penalty scored); James-Wildin (penalty missed)

=== EFL Cup ===
Win Draw Loss Fixtures

8 August 2023 R1	Port Vale	3–2	Fleetwood Town	Burslem
19:45 BST	Chislett 18', 72'; Thomas 58'	Report	Hayes 5'; Graydon 47'	Stadium: Vale Park; Attendance: 2,743; Referee: Edward Duckworth; Assistant referees: Lisa Rashid, Christopher Husband; Fourth official: Matthew Jones

29 August 2023 R2	Port Vale	0–0 (2–0 p)	Crewe Alexandra	Burslem
19:45 BST		Report		Stadium: Vale Park; Attendance: 6,375; Referee: Seb Stockbridge; Assistant referees: Callum Jones, Ollie Williams; Fourth official: Thomas Kirk
	Penalties
	Wilson (penalty scored); Arblaster (penalty scored); Sang (penalty missed)		Nevitt (penalty missed); Long (penalty missed); Adebisi (penalty missed); Tabiner (penalty missed)

26 September 2023 R3	Port Vale	2–1	Sutton United	Burslem
19:45 BST	Thomas 49'; Ojo 83'	Report	Coley 70'	Stadium: Vale Park; Attendance: 4,113; Referee: Will Finnie; Assistant referees: Darren Williams, Abbas Khan; Fourth official: Thomas Parsons

31 October 2023 R4	Mansfield Town	0–1	Port Vale	Mansfield
19:45 GMT		Report	Devine 50'	Stadium: Field Mill; Attendance: 7,432; Referee: Thomas Bramall; Assistant referees: Rob Smith, Natalie Aspinall; Fourth official: David Webb

19 December 2023 Quarter-final	Port Vale	0–3	Middlesbrough	Burslem
19:45 GMT		Report	Howson 11'; Rogers 23'; Crooks 53'	Stadium: Vale Park; Attendance: 12,006; Referee: Michael Salisbury; Fourth official: Tony Harrington

=== EFL Trophy ===
Pos	Div	Team	Pld	W	PW	PL	L	GF	GA	GD	Pts	Qualification
1	L2	Wrexham	3	3	0	0	0	6	1	+5	9	Advance to Round 2
2	L1	Port Vale	3	1	1	0	1	3	3	0	5	Advance to Round 2
3	L2	Crewe Alexandra	3	1	0	0	2	2	5	−3	3	
4	ACA	Newcastle United U21	3	0	0	1	2	2	4	−2	1	

Updated to match(es) played on 7 November 2023. Source: EFL.com

Win Draw Loss Fixtures

5 September 2023 Group stage	Port Vale	1–0	Crewe Alexandra	Burslem
19:45 BST	Garrity 18'	Report		Stadium: Vale Park; Attendance: 2,846; Referee: Steven Copeland; Assistant referees: Thomas Harty, Andrew Ellis; Fourth official: Elliot Bell

10 October 2023 Group stage	Port Vale	1–1 (3–2 p)	Newcastle United U21	Burslem
19:45 BST	Debrah 17'	Report	Stanton 90'	Stadium: Vale Park; Attendance: 1,197; Referee: Jacob Miles; Assistant referees: Conor Brown, Daniel Guest; Fourth official: Melissa Burgin
	Penalties
	Garrity (penalty scored); Lowe (penalty scored); Shorrock (penalty missed); Walters (penalty missed); Clark (penalty scored)		Diallo (penalty scored); Stanton (penalty missed); Crossley (penalty missed); Huntley (penalty scored); Ndiweni (penalty missed)

7 November 2023 Group stage	Wrexham	2–1	Port Vale	Wrexham
19:30 GMT	Mullin 70'; McClean 83'	Report	Thomas 31'	Stadium: Racecourse Ground; Attendance: 7,870; Referee: Lewis Smith; Assistant referees: Andrew Ellis, Thomas Harty; Fourth official: Elliot Bell

5 December 2023 R2	Bolton Wanderers	2–0	Port Vale	Horwich
19:45 GMT	Charles 9'; Mendes Gomes 64'	Report		Stadium: Toughsheet Community Stadium; Attendance: 2,150; Referee: Matthew Corlett; Fourth official: Andrew Miller

== Squad statistics ==
=== Appearances and goals ===
Key to positions: GK – Goalkeeper; DF – Defender; MF – Midfielder; FW – Forward

No.	Pos	Nat	Player	Total		EFL League One		FA Cup		EFL Cup		EFL Trophy	
No.	Pos	Nat	Player	Apps	Goals	Apps	Goals	Apps	Goals	Apps	Goals	Apps	Goals
1	GK	(England) ENG	Connor Ripley	55	0	46	0	4	0	5	0	0	0
2	DF	(England) ENG	Lewis Cass	20	1	12	0	2	1	4	0	2	0
3	DF	(England) ENG	Dan Jones	15	0	14	0	0	0	1	0	0	0
4	MF	(England) ENG	Tom Sang	48	0	38	0	4	0	5	0	1	0
5	DF	(Poland) POL	Kacper Łopata	6	0	6	0	0	0	0	0	0	0
6	DF	(England) ENG	Nathan Smith	50	2	42	2	4	0	3	0	1	0
7	DF	(Wales) WAL	Mitch Clark	15	0	13	0	0	0	0	0	2	0
8	MF	(England) ENG	Ben Garrity	50	12	39	9	4	2	4	0	3	1
9	FW	(England) ENG	Ryan Loft	35	2	26	1	4	1	2	0	3	0
10	MF	(South Africa) RSA	Ethan Chislett	54	11	43	9	4	0	4	2	3	0
11	FW	(England) ENG	Alex Mighten	10	0	10	0	0	0	0	0	0	0
12	FW	(Uganda) UGA	Uche Ikpeazu	26	1	20	1	3	0	2	0	1	0
13	GK	(Canada) CAN	Jayson Leutwiler	4	0	0	0	0	0	0	0	4	0
14	MF	(Belgium) BEL	Funso Ojo	49	4	40	2	4	1	4	1	1	0
15	MF	(England) ENG	Conor Grant	37	0	30	0	2	0	3	0	2	0
16	MF	(England) ENG	Jason Lowe	38	0	29	0	3	0	4	0	2	0
17	DF	(Scotland) SCO	Alex Iacovitti	38	1	31	1	2	0	3	0	2	0
19	FW	(England) ENG	Gavin Massey	51	2	40	1	4	1	4	0	3	0
20	MF	(England) ENG	Jensen Weir	17	1	17	1	0	0	0	0	0	0
21	FW	(England) ENG	James Plant	35	0	26	0	3	0	4	0	2	0
23	MF	(England) ENG	Jack Shorrock	16	1	12	1	0	0	1	0	3	0
24	MF	(England) ENG	Rhys Walters	21	0	11	0	3	0	3	0	4	0
25	FW	(England) ENG	Baylee Dipepa	26	3	22	3	0	0	0	0	4	0
26	MF	(England) ENG	Liam Brazier	3	0	0	0	0	0	0	0	3	0
27	DF	(England) ENG	Jesse Debrah	40	1	31	0	3	0	3	0	3	1
28	FW	(England) ENG	Andrew Buah	3	0	1	0	0	0	0	0	2	0
29	FW	(England) ENG	James Wilson	31	4	27	4	0	0	3	0	1	0
30	DF	(England) ENG	Ben Lomax	6	0	3	0	1	0	0	0	2	0
31	MF	(England) ENG	Daniel Mahaffy	1	0	0	0	0	0	0	0	1	0
32	MF	(England) ENG	Logan Cousins	1	0	0	0	0	0	0	0	1	0
33	DF	(New Zealand) NZL	Deklan Wynne	0	0	0	0	0	0	0	0	0	0
34	MF	(England) ENG	Karl Agnero	0	0	0	0	0	0	0	0	0	0
44	MF	(England) ENG	Dan Gore	1	0	1	0	0	0	0	0	0	0
Players who featured but departed the club during the season:
5	DF	(Northern Ireland) NIR	Kofi Balmer	16	0	11	0	0	0	2	0	3	0
5	DF	(England) ENG	Rhys Williams	0	0	0	0	0	0	0	0	0	0
9	FW	(Wales) WAL	Ellis Harrison	2	0	1	0	0	0	1	0	0	0
11	DF	(England) ENG	Mal Benning	0	0	0	0	0	0	0	0	0	0
11	MF	(England) ENG	Alfie Devine	26	3	20	2	2	0	4	1	0	0
18	MF	(England) ENG	Ollie Arblaster	26	2	20	2	2	0	4	0	0	0
20	MF	(England) ENG	Tom Conlon	4	0	1	0	1	0	0	0	2	0
22	MF	(England) ENG	Tommy McDermott	2	0	0	0	0	0	1	0	1	0
44	FW	(Wales) WAL	Josh Thomas	15	3	11	0	0	0	3	2	1	1

=== Top scorers ===
Place	Position	Nation	Number	Name	EFL League One	FA Cup	EFL Cup	EFL Trophy	Total
1	MF	England	8	Ben Garrity	9	2	0	1	12
2	MF	South Africa	10	Ethan Chislett	9	0	2	0	11
3	MF	Belgium	14	Funso Ojo	2	1	1	0	4
–	FW	England	29	James Wilson	4	0	0	0	4
5	MF	England	11	Alfie Devine	2	0	1	0	3
–	FW	England	25	Baylee Dipepa	3	0	0	0	3
–	FW	Wales	44	Josh Thomas	0	0	2	1	3
8	MF	England	18	Ollie Arblaster	2	0	0	0	2
–	FW	England	9	Ryan Loft	1	1	0	0	2
–	FW	England	19	Gavin Massey	1	1	0	0	2
–	DF	England	6	Nathan Smith	2	0	0	0	2
12	DF	England	2	Lewis Cass	0	1	0	0	1
–	DF	England	27	Jesse Debrah	0	0	0	1	1
–	DF	Scotland	17	Alex Iacovitti	1	0	0	0	1
–	FW	Uganda	12	Uche Ikpeazu	1	0	0	0	1
–	MF	England	23	Jack Shorrock	1	0	0	0	1
–	MF	England	20	Jensen Weir	1	0	0	0	1
–	–	–	–	Own goals	2	0	0	0	2
				TOTALS	41	6	6	3	56

=== Disciplinary record ===
Number	Nation	Position	Name	EFL League One		FA Cup		EFL Cup		EFL Trophy		Total	
Number	Nation	Position	Name	Yellow card	Red card	Yellow card	Red card	Yellow card	Red card	Yellow card	Red card	Yellow card	Red card
6	England	DF	Nathan Smith	5	0	0	1	1	0	0	0	6	1
18	England	MF	Ollie Arblaster	4	1	0	0	1	0	0	0	5	1
27	England	DF	Jesse Debrah	4	1	0	0	0	0	0	0	4	1
17	Scotland	DF	Alex Iacovitti	5	0	1	0	3	0	1	0	10	0
8	England	MF	Ben Garrity	7	0	1	0	1	0	0	0	9	0
16	England	MF	Jason Lowe	6	0	1	0	0	0	1	0	8	0
14	Belgium	MF	Funso Ojo	7	0	0	0	0	0	0	0	7	0
5	England	DF	Kofi Balmer	5	0	0	0	1	0	0	0	6	0
19	England	FW	Gavin Massey	6	0	0	0	0	0	0	0	6	0
1	England	GK	Connor Ripley	5	0	1	0	0	0	0	0	6	0
10	South Africa	MF	Ethan Chislett	3	0	0	0	2	0	0	0	5	0
11	England	MF	Alfie Devine	3	0	0	0	1	0	0	0	4	0
9	England	FW	Ryan Loft	2	0	1	0	1	0	0	0	4	0
4	England	DF	Tom Sang	4	0	0	0	0	0	0	0	4	0
7	Wales	DF	Mitch Clark	2	0	0	0	0	0	1	0	3	0
12	Uganda	FW	Uche Ikpeazu	2	0	1	0	0	0	0	0	3	0
2	England	DF	Lewis Cass	1	0	0	0	1	0	0	0	2	0
3	England	DF	Dan Jones	2	0	0	0	0	0	0	0	2	0
23	England	MF	Jack Shorrock	0	0	0	0	0	0	2	0	2	0
20	England	MF	Jensen Weir	2	0	0	0	0	0	0	0	2	0
44	Wales	FW	Josh Thomas	2	0	0	0	0	0	0	0	2	0
29	England	FW	James Wilson	2	0	0	0	0	0	0	0	2	0
15	England	MF	Conor Grant	0	0	0	0	1	0	0	0	1	0
22	England	MF	Tommy McDermott	0	0	0	0	0	0	1	0	1	0
11	England	FW	Alex Mighten	1	0	0	0	0	0	0	0	1	0
			TOTALS	80	2	6	1	13	0	6	0	105	3

Sourced from Soccerway.

== Transfers ==
=== Transfers in ===
Date from	Position	Nationality	Name	From	Fee	Ref.
1 July 2023 (Note: The transfer was announced on 27 June and would become official on 1 July once his contract at Plymouth Argyle expired)	CM	ENG	Conor Grant	Plymouth Argyle	Free transfer	
1 July 2023 (Note: The transfer was announced on 23 June and would become official on 1 July once his contract at Ross County expired)	CB	SCO	Alex Iacovitti	(Scotland) Ross County	Free transfer	
1 July 2023 (Note: The transfer was announced on 29 June and would become official on 1 July once his contract at Oldham Athletic expired)	GK	CAN	Jayson Leutwiler	Oldham Athletic	Free transfer	
1 July 2023 (Note: The transfer was announced on 22 June, and would become official on 1 July once his contract at Morecambe expired)	GK	ENG	Connor Ripley	Morecambe	Free transfer	
1 July 2023 (Note: The transfer was announced on 12 June and would become official on 1 July once his contract at Cardiff City expired)	RM	ENG	Tom Sang	(Wales) Cardiff City	Free transfer	
2 July 2023	RB	WAL	Mitch Clark	Accrington Stanley	Free transfer	
3 July 2023	AM	RSA	Ethan Chislett	AFC Wimbledon	Free transfer	
3 July 2023	DM	ENG	Jason Lowe	Salford City	Free	
1 September 2023	CF	ENG	Ryan Loft	Bristol Rovers	Undisclosed	
18 September 2023	CB	ENG	Jesse Debrah	FC Halifax Town	Compensation	
4 October 2023	CF	UGA	Uche Ikpeazu	(Turkey) Konyaspor	Free transfer	
10 April 2024	LB	NZL	Deklan Wynne	(United States) Charleston Battery	Free transfer	

=== Transfers out ===
Date from	Position	Nationality	Name	To	Fee	Ref.
4 July 2023	CB	ENG	Will Forrester	Bolton Wanderers	Undisclosed (Note: The transfer fee was reported to be £250,000.)	
3 August 2023	LB	ENG	Mal Benning	Shrewsbury Town	Free transfer	
1 September 2023	CF	WAL	Ellis Harrison	Milton Keynes Dons	Undisclosed	
9 January 2024	CM	ENG	Tom Conlon	Oldham Athletic	Free transfer	
1 February 2024	AM	ENG	Tommy McDermott	Burnley	Undisclosed	
30 June 2024	CB	ENG	Lewis Cass	Grimsby Town	Released	
30 June 2024	CF	UGA	Uche Ikpeazu	(Scotland) St Johnstone	Rejected contract	
30 June 2024	GK	CAN	Jayson Leutwiler	Retired		
30 June 2024	RW	ENG	Gavin Massey	Gavin Massey	Released	
30 June 2024	CF	ENG	James Wilson	Northampton Town	Released	

=== Loans in ===
Date from	Position	Nationality	Name	From	Date until	Ref.
15 July 2023	CB	NIR	Kofi Balmer	Crystal Palace	16 January 2024 (Note: On 16 January, Balmer was recalled back early by Crystal Palace.)	
17 July 2023	CM	ENG	Ollie Arblaster	Sheffield United	29 December 2023 (Note: On 29 December, Arblaster was recalled back early by Sheffield United.)	
2 August 2023	CF	WAL	Josh Thomas	(Wales) Swansea City	11 January 2024 (Note: On 11 January, Thomas was recalled back early by Swansea City.)	
25 August 2023	AM	ENG	Alfie Devine	Tottenham Hotspur	17 January 2024 (Note: On 17 January, Devine was recalled back early by Tottenham Hotspur.)	
9 January 2024	CM	ENG	Jensen Weir	Brighton & Hove Albion	End of season	
16 January 2024	CB	ENG	Rhys Williams	Liverpool	1 February 2024 (Note: On 1 February, Williams returned to Liverpool due to an underlying injury issue.)	
23 January 2024	CM	ENG	Dan Gore	Manchester United	End of season	
1 February 2024	CB	POL	Kacper Łopata	Barnsley	End of season	
1 February 2024	LW	ENG	Alex Mighten	Nottingham Forest	End of season	

=== Loans out ===
Date from	Position	Nationality	Name	To	Date until	Ref.
10 August 2023	AM	ENG	Tommy McDermott	Rochdale	7 November 2023 (Note: On 7 November, McDermott was recalled back early by Port Vale.)	
17 November 2023	AM	ENG	Tommy McDermott	Curzon Ashton	18 December 2023	
19 December 2023	LB	ENG	Jack Shorrock	Stafford Rangers	26 December 2023 (Note: On 26 December, Shorrock was recalled back early by Port Vale.)	
23 December 2023	LB	ENG	Callum Besford	Stone Old Alleynians	January 2024	
23 December 2023	LW	ENG	Andrew Buah	Newcastle Town	1 January 2024	
23 December 2023	CM	ENG	Eli Fisher	Newcastle Town	1 January 2024	
23 December 2023	CM	ENG	Daniel Mahaffy	Newcastle Town	1 January 2024	
23 December 2023	CF	THA	Caelan Ryan	Runcorn Linnets	1 January 2024	
23 December 2023	CB	ENG	Braden Webb	Stone Old Alleynians	1 January 2024	
1 February 2024	CB	ENG	Lewis Cass	Stockport County	End of season	
2 February 2024	CM	ENG	Eli Fisher	Northwich Victoria	End of season	
3 April 2024	CB	ENG	Callum Besford	Eccleshall	End of season	
3 April 2024	CM	ENG	Daniel Mahaffy	AFC Liverpool	End of season	
3 April 2024	CF	THA	Caelan Ryan	Market Drayton Town	End of season	
3 April 2024	CB	ENG	Braden Webb	Market Drayton Town	End of season	
