= Ben Garrity =

English footballer

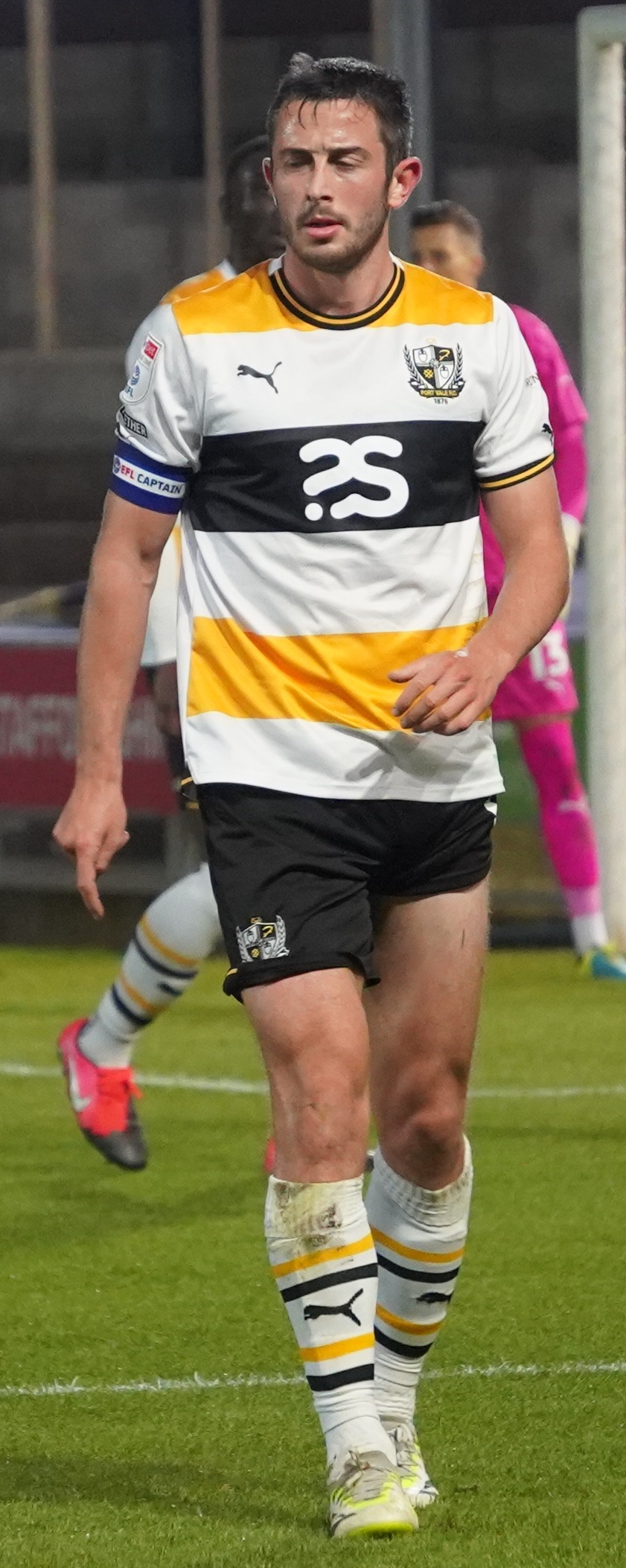
- Garrity captaining Port Vale in October 2023.

Personal information
- Full name: Benjamin Matthew Garrity
- Date of birth: 12 February 1997 (age 29)
- Place of birth: Croxteth, Liverpool, England
- Height: 6 ft 0 in (1.83 m)
- Position: Midfielder

Team information
- Current team: Port Vale
- Number: 8

Youth career
- 2004–2013: NSC Junior

Senior career*
Years	Team	Apps	(Gls)
2013	Oyster Martyrs		
2013	Formby	3	(0)
2013–2018	Lower Breck		
2018–2020	Warrington Town	46	(12)
2020–2021	Blackpool	0	(0)
2020–2021	→ Oldham Athletic (loan)	29	(2)
2021–	Port Vale	179	(27)
- * Club domestic league appearances and goals as of 22:43, 20 October 2026 (UTC)

Benjamin Matthew Garrity (born 12 February 1997) is an English professional footballer who plays as a midfielder for EFL League Two club Port Vale. He is also the club captain.

Garrity began his career playing non-League football at Merseyside-based clubs NSC Junior, Oyster Martyrs, Formby and Lower Breck, winning Lower Breck's Player of the Season award in 2016–17. He joined Northern Premier League Premier Division side Warrington Town in 2018 and impressed enough to win a move to Blackpool in January 2020, turning professional in the English Football League shortly before the age of 23. He spent the 2020–21 season on loan at Oldham Athletic and was sold to Port Vale in June 2021. He helped the club to win promotion out of League Two via the play-offs in 2022 and was also named as the club's Player of the Year. He won the award again in 2024 and won a second League Two promotion with the club at the end of the 2024–25 season.

== Career ==
=== Early career ===
Garrity spent his early career with NSC Junior, playing for the club in the Walton & Kirkdale Junior Football League from 2004 to 2013. He then moved on to Oyster Martyrs, a Sunday league team in Liverpool. In October 2013, Garrity began a short spell at North West Counties Football League side Formby. Despite only making seven appearances, he played in four different competitions; league, Liverpool Senior Cup, NWCFL League Challenge Cup, and the NWCFL First Division Trophy. He then moved to Lower Breck in the Liverpool County Premier League. He made 29 appearances for Lower Breck in the 2016–17 season, scoring eight goals and making eight assists, and was named as the club's Player of the Season. He scored seven goals and made five assists from 28 appearances in the 2017–18 campaign.

"I was playing Sunday and Saturday league football since I was a kid. I went into academies, but not for six weeks or anything like that, just little ones and I wouldn't go back when I was younger. I'm not saying I would have kicked on and been in those academies, I just didn't really like getting told what to do when I was younger.

— Garrity reflecting on his youth in 2021.

=== Warrington Town ===
Garrity was signed by Warrington Town in 2018. He signed a new two-year deal with the club in June 2019 despite attracting interest from higher-level clubs and was described as "irreplaceable" by manager Paul Carden. He spent 18 months with Warrington in the Northern Premier League Premier Division, scoring 17 goals in 54 league and cup games for the club, including two goals in their 'super play-off' defeat to King's Lynn Town at the end of the 2018–19 season. He missed just two league games during his time at Cantilever Park and was the club's top-scorer mid-way through the 2019–20 campaign. Upon leaving the club he said that he loved his time at Warrington and was disappointed not to have helped them achieve promotion. He became the first Warrington player to move directly into the English Football League in more than 20 years.

=== Blackpool ===
Garrity turned professional with Blackpool on 31 January 2020, signing an 18-month contract, after Blackpool paid an undisclosed fee reported to be in the region of £25,000. The transfer saw him move up four divisions to join the League One side. Manager Simon Grayson said the club had tracked Garrity for several months. He scored on his debut for the club, in a friendly game against Crewe Alexandra.

He was allowed to leave Bloomfield Road on loan after telling manager Neil Critchley he was desperate to play first-team games. On 2 September 2020, Garrity moved on loan to Oldham Athletic for the 2020–21 season after spending two weeks on trial at Boundary Park. He made his debut for the club three days later in the EFL Cup, opening the scoring in a 3–0 victory over Carlisle United, heading home a Bobby Grant free kick. On 17 October, he scored his first League Two goal in a 2–1 win away at Bolton Wanderers. He added further goals against Hampton & Richmond Borough in the FA Cup and Barrow in the league, leading him to be described as a "lucky charm" for the club by the Warrington Guardian's Matt Turner. By January he was one of seven loan signings made by manager Harry Kewell, which left him at a disadvantage as EFL rules meant only five loanees could be named in matchday squads and four of the loanees were seen as key players. He also missed two months of the season due to injury, but was praised by new manager Keith Curle for his work rate upon his return to action in early April. Garrity ended his loan spell with the "Latics" with four goals in 38 appearances across all competitions.

Though Garrity never made a competitive appearance for Blackpool, the club took an option to extend his contract shortly before his sale to Port Vale.

=== Port Vale ===
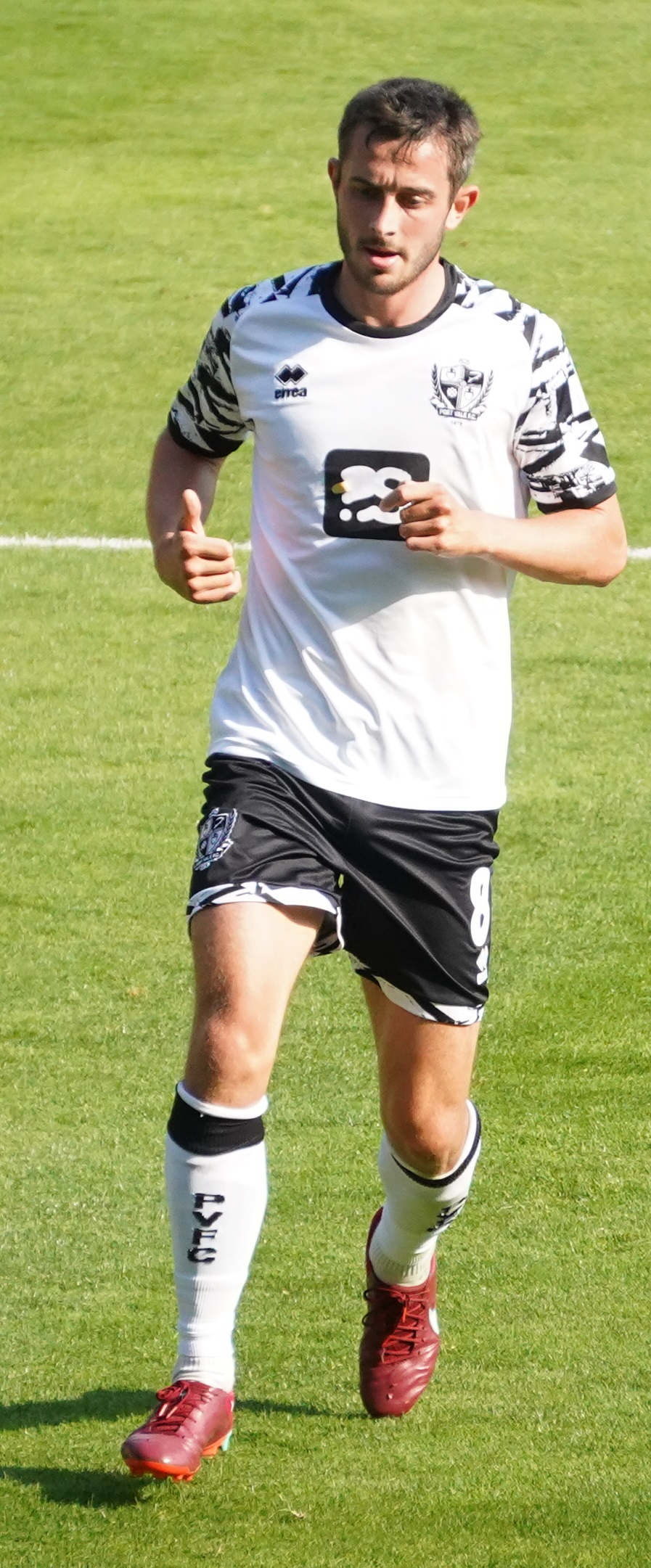
Garrity playing for Port Vale in August 2022

On 4 June 2021, it was announced that Garrity would join League Two side Port Vale for an undisclosed fee. Manager Darrell Clarke described him as a "young, hungry and ambitious footballer with great energy and fitness levels". He scored his first goals for the "Valiants" on 11 September, his brace securing a 2–1 victory away at Swindon Town; Clarke praised Garrity for his serious professionalism after the match, pointing out that "he has tests to make sure he is getting the right food into his system". He went on to score the only goal of the game against Scunthorpe United and was nominated for September's Player of the Month award. On 7 December, he was played as a forward after Vale suffered an injury crisis that left them short of recognized strikers, and scored two goals to secure a 2–1 win at Bristol Rovers. He was nominated for March's Player of the Month award after "driving Vale forward in the absence of captain Tom Conlon", scoring three goals and creating another. He started in the play-off final at Wembley Stadium as Vale secured promotion with a 3–0 victory over Mansfield Town; Michael Baggaley of The Sentinel wrote that "[Garrity] never stopped running, as has been the case all season... a huge threat in the attacking midfield role". At the club's end of season awards, Garrity was named as Fan's Player of the Year, Player's Player of the Year and Supporter's Club Player of the Year.

Garrity was linked with a move to League One rivals Peterborough United in August 2022. He remained an ever-present for Vale in the first quarter of the 2022–23 season, playing in a deeper defensive role which restricted his opportunities to get forward and score goals. He maintained his consistency into February, providing an assist for Ellis Harrison to score the opening goal of a 2–1 defeat at Bolton Wanderers. However, he was sidelined with a calf injury at the beginning of March. He signed a two-year contract extension in May; David Flitcroft, the club's director of football said that he "epitomises our core values. His appetite for continual improvement in every aspect of his life and his game makes him an outstanding leader and a pivotal member of the group".

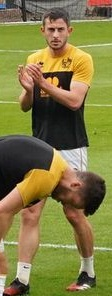
Garrity warming up at Vale Park in May 2022.

He scored the only goal of the game in a 1–0 win over Reading at Vale Park on 12 August 2023 and was named on the EFL League One Team of the Week. Supporters named him as the club's Player of the Month for September after he scored three goals and provided an assist in five games. Speaking in November, manager Andy Crosby said that he felt Garrity was "probably the best in the league at... the way he arrives in that near-post area... he does it time and time again whether it is from free play or set plays". Garrity was named in the EFL Team of the Week when he scored the opening goal and "made a total of two tackles, six clearances, one key pass and one successful dribble in a strong all-round display" in a 3–0 win over Blackpool on 29 December. He was again voted as the club's Player of the Month. However, a recurrence of his calf problems the following month saw him ruled out of action for an extended period. He finished the 2023–24 season as the club's top-scorer with 12 goals as Vale suffered relegation back into League Two. He was voted Player of the Year by supporters, for a second time, at the end of the 2023–24 season, and remarked that "It's been a season full of ups and downs and unfortunately ended in a way we didn't want, but I can assure you that we will be doing everything we can to bounce back".

New manager Darren Moore appointed Garrity as the club captain in August 2024. He signed a one-year contract extension later in the month. He was named on the EFL Team of the Week after scoring both goals against Salford City on the opening day of the 2024–25 season. He was deployed in a more defensive role as the season progressed, however, playing in a central midfield partnership with Ryan Croasdale. He started the first 14 league games of the campaign before being sidelined through injury at the end of October. The team struggled in his absence, and by December they had won just two of the 24 league games that Garrity was not involved in since promotion had been achieved in 2022. He returned to start four games in January and scored in a win against Newport County as the Vale also returned to good form. However, he was sidelined again the following month after sustaining an ankle injury. He scored five goals in 29 league games throughout the campaign, helping the team to secure an automatic promotion place.

Garrity missed the opening four matches of the 2025–26 season due to a recurrence of his ankle injury towards the end of pre-season. He struggled for form as he was played in a deeper role and lacked full fitness following his return from injury. He was named on EFL Team of the Week for his "dynamic play" in a 0–0 draw with Wycombe Wanderers on 15 November. New manager Jon Brady said in February that he saw Garrity as an attacking number eight. However, Garrity had missed December and January due to injury and aggravated the injury in early February after playing two games, leading to another spell on the sidelines. He made 22 league starts in the 2025–26 season, which culminated in relegation. He was the only out of contract player to be offered a new deal. The club announced that he had signed the two-year contract on 27 May, with Brady stating he "represents everything we want Port Vale to be".

He was absent from pre-season friendly games in July 2026 as Brady felt it best to build his fitness up with a "slower process" owing to his recent injury problems. Garrity stated that "I need to realise sometimes that maybe I can't play when I am feeling something". He sustained another injury in mid-October.

== Style of play ==
Garrity is an attacking box-to-box midfielder with good energy and fitness levels. He has a strong aerial presence, scoring many of his goals from headers. He has stated that "I am not as good as other people so I know I need to work harder than them, and then over time I will get better". His ability to arrive late in the box and score goals has seen him play as an emergency striker.

== Personal life ==
Garrity worked as an engineer for five years before becoming a professional footballer in 2020. He completed an apprenticeship working in plant mechanics, working on the maintenance of cherry pickers and access machines.

== Career statistics ==
As of match played 20 October 2026

Appearances and goals by club, season and competition
Club	Season	League			FA Cup		EFL Cup		Other		Total	
Club	Season	Division	Apps	Goals	Apps	Goals	Apps	Goals	Apps	Goals	Apps	Goals
Formby	2013–14	North West Counties League; First Division	3	0	0	0	–		4 (Note: One appearances in Liverpool Senior Cup, two appearances in NWCFL First Division Trophy, one appearances in NWCFL League Challenge Cup)	0	7	0
Warrington Town	2018–19	Northern Premier League; Premier Division	21	2	0	0	–		3 (Note: Appearances in Northern Premier League play-offs)	4	24	6
Warrington Town	2019–20	Northern Premier League; Premier Division	25	10	4	1	–		1 (Note: Appearance(s) in FA Trophy)	0	30	11
Warrington Town	Total		46	12	4	1	–		4	4	54	17
Blackpool	2019–20	League One	0	0	0	0	0	0	0	0	0	0
Blackpool	2020–21	League One	0	0	0	0	0	0	0	0	0	0
Blackpool	Total		0	0	0	0	0	0	0	0	0	0
Oldham Athletic (loan)	2020–21	League Two	29	2	3	1	2	1	4 (Note: Appearance(s) in EFL Trophy)	0	38	4
Port Vale	2021–22	League Two	43	12	3	0	1	0	6 (Note: Three appearances in EFL Trophy, three appearances in League Two play-offs)	0	53	12
Port Vale	2022–23	League One	34	1	0	0	1	0	2	0	37	1
Port Vale	2023–24	League One	39	9	4	2	4	0	3	1	50	12
Port Vale	2024–25	League Two	29	5	0	0	0	0	1	0	30	5
Port Vale	2025–26	League One	25	0	1	0	2	0	0	0	28	0
Port Vale	2026–27	League Two	9	0	0	0	0	0	1	0	10	0
Port Vale	Total		179	27	8	2	8	0	13	1	208	30
Career total			257	41	15	4	10	1	25	5	307	51

== Honours ==
Port Vale

- EFL League Two play-offs: 2022
- EFL League Two second-place promotion: 2024–25

Individual

- Lower Breck Player of the Season: 2016–17
- Port Vale Player of the Year: 2021–22, 2023–24
