= Ollie Arblaster =

English footballer (born 2004)

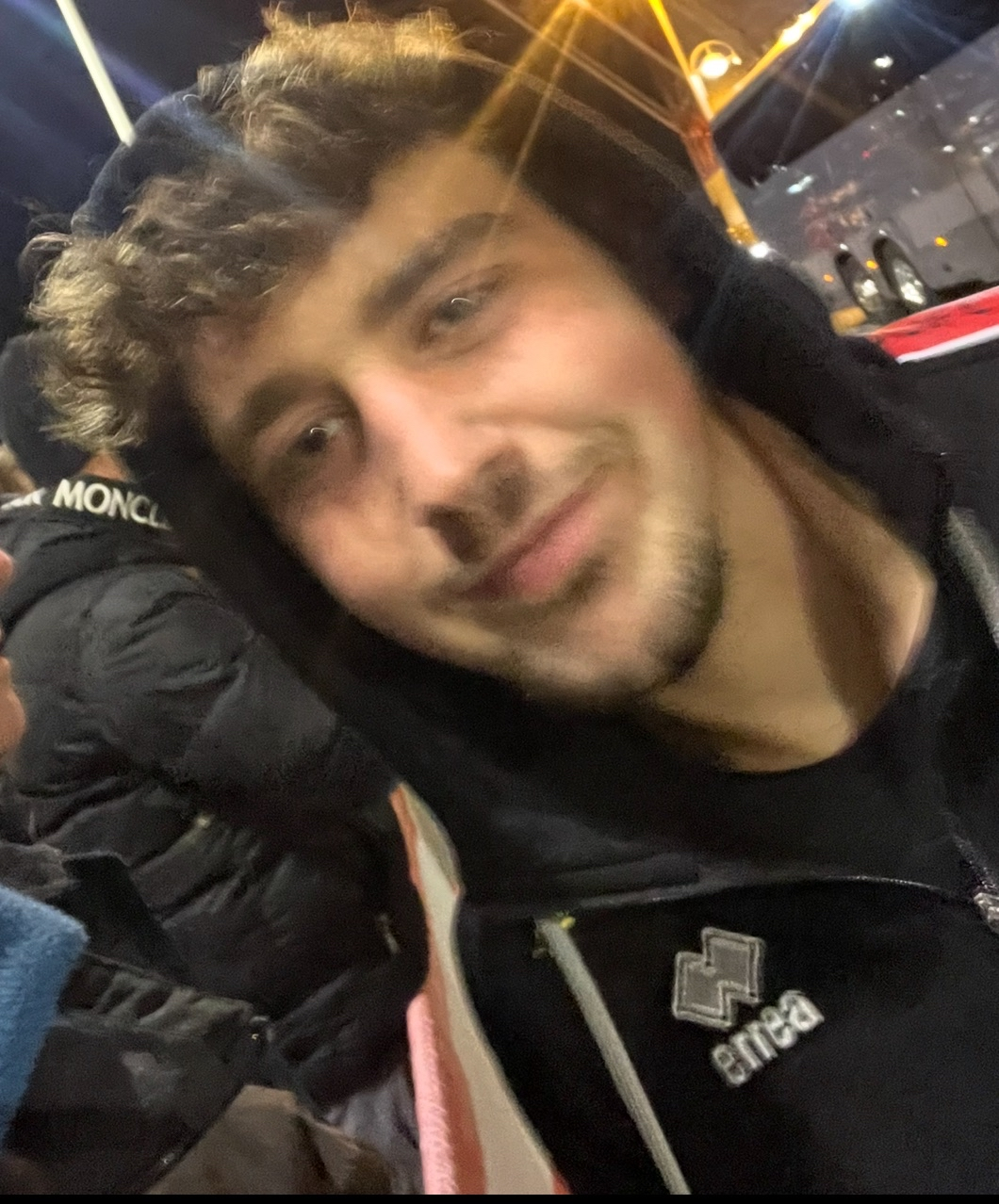
- Arblaster with Sheffield United in 2024

Personal information
- Full name: Oliver Luke Arblaster
- Date of birth: 8 January 2004 (age 22)
- Place of birth: Sheffield, England
- Height: 5 ft 9 in (1.75 m)
- Position: Midfielder

Team information
- Current team: Sheffield United
- Number: 4

Youth career
- 2010–2021: Sheffield United

Senior career*
Years	Team	Apps	(Gls)
2021–	Sheffield United	63	(3)
2021	→ Bradford (Park Avenue) (loan)	5	(0)
2023	→ Port Vale (loan)	20	(2)

International career
2021–2022	England U18	5	(1)
2023–2024	England U20	6	(1)
- * Club domestic league appearances and goals as of 22:26, 21 November 2026 (UTC)

Oliver Luke Arblaster (born 8 January 2004) is an English professional footballer who plays as a midfielder for EFL Championship club Sheffield United.

Arblaster turned professional at Sheffield United in May 2018. He was loaned out to Bradford (Park Avenue) in October 2021. He played four games of United's 2022–23 Championship promotion-winning campaign. He was loaned out to Port Vale for the first half of the 2023–24 season.

== Club career ==
=== Sheffield United ===
Arblaster joined the Academy at Sheffield United at the age of six. He initially wanted to be a goalkeeper, following in the footsteps of his father and grandfather, before accepting he would play outfield due to his relatively short stature. He turned professional at the club in May 2018. On 22 October 2021, he joined Bradford (Park Avenue) on a youth-loan until 3 January, alongside Nickseon Gomis. He made his senior debut later that day in a 5–1 defeat at Kidderminster Harriers. He impressed manager Mark Bower and retained his starting place for a total of five matches at the Horsfall Stadium. He was recalled to Bramall Lane by Sheffield United on 3 December. He was twice named in United's matchday squads in the 2021–22 season.

He made his debut for Sheffield United in an EFL Cup match as the Blades lost 1–0 at West Bromwich Albion on 11 August 2022. He made his Championship debut on 4 September, coming on as a late substitute in a 2–0 win at Hull City. He made his first league start on 12 November, playing the first half of 1–0 win at Cardiff City. He played no further part in the 2022–23 promotion-winning season, though was deemed too useful to loan out as the club management feared a possible injury crisis could develop.

On 17 July 2023, Arblaster signed for League One club Port Vale on a season-long loan deal, becoming manager Andy Crosby's tenth signing of the summer. David Flitcroft, the club's director of football, said that "he is a player that has great potential ahead of him we would like to thank Paul Heckingbottom of Sheffield United for entrusting us with the further development of him". He made an immediate impact to the 2023–24 season, being named as the club's Player of the Month as he "played a key role in the engine room of a Port Vale side that accumulated 10 points throughout August". He scored his first goal in the English Football League at Vale Park on 19 September, when he fired in a late consolation during a 3–2 defeat to Burton Albion. On 11 November, he received the first red card of his career after being sent off following a second booking offence for a reckless late challenge on Ethan Erhahon in a 1–1 draw with Lincoln City. On 19 December, he was stretchered off with a badly-gashed knee during the second half of a 3–0 defeat to Middlesbrough in the quarter-finals of the EFL Cup and was ruled out of action for an undetermined period of weeks. Ten days later, it was confirmed that he had been recalled to Sheffield United, with new manager Chris Wilder reportedly keen to play him once he returned to fitness. He made his Premier League debut on 4 March 2024 when he came on as a 64th-minute substitute in Sheffield United's 6–0 home defeat to Arsenal. He earned his first Premier League start five days later in a 2–2 draw at AFC Bournemouth. He was named as the club's Player of the Month for March. On 24 April, he captained Sheffield United in a 4–2 defeat by Manchester United at Old Trafford.

He opened the 2024–25 season by scoring the opening goal of a 2–0 win at Preston North End and then spent the next day with the Port Vale away fans in their League Two fixture at Salford City. He was named on the EFL Team of the Week having also "made two key passes, two successful dribbles, three interceptions and nine ball recoveries" according to WhoScored.com. He picked up an anterior cruciate ligament injury during a 1–0 win over Sheffield derby rivals Sheffield Wednesday which required surgery and ruled him out until the end of the 2024–25 season.

In September 2025, he suffered an injury setback that delayed his recovery by another two months. Speaking in February 2026, Chris Wilder defended Arblaster after he received criticism for his performances following his return to fitness, saying the criticism was "completely unjust" in light of his 13-month layoff. He featured 22 times in the 2025–26 season.

== International career ==
In November 2021, Arblaster was called up to the England under-18 squad by head coach Neil Ryan for the Pinatar Tournament in Spain, featuring against Belgium. He scored the winning goal in a 3–2 victory over Austria on 7 June 2022. He was called up to the England under-20 squad for the first time in August 2023. In October 2023, he was called up to the England U-20 side for matches against Portugal U-20 and Romania U-20. He made his U20 debut on 12 October 2023 during a 2–0 away defeat to Romania.

== Style of play ==
Arblaster is a technically gifted midfielder with an eye for goal. Coach Jack Lester said that he had a "brilliant footballing brain".

== Career statistics ==
As of match played 8 September 2026

Appearances and goals by club, season and competition
Club	Season	League			FA Cup		EFL Cup		Other		Total	
Club	Season	Division	Apps	Goals	Apps	Goals	Apps	Goals	Apps	Goals	Apps	Goals
Sheffield United	2021–22	Championship	0	0	0	0	0	0	0	0	0	0
Sheffield United	2022–23	Championship	4	0	0	0	1	0	—		5	0
Sheffield United	2023–24	Premier League	12	0	0	0	0	0	—		12	0
Sheffield United	2024–25	Championship	12	2	0	0	0	0	0	0	12	2
Sheffield United	2025–26	Championship	21	0	1	0	0	0	—		22	0
Sheffield United	2026–27	Championship	5	0	0	0	2	0	—		7	0
Sheffield United	Total		54	2	1	0	3	0	0	0	58	2
Bradford (Park Avenue) (loan)	2021–22	National League North	5	0	0	0	—		0	0	5	0
Port Vale (loan)	2023–24	League One	20	2	2	0	4	0	0	0	26	2
Career total			79	4	3	0	7	0	0	0	89	4

== Honours ==
Sheffield United

- EFL Championship second-place promotion: 2022–23
