= Josh Thomas (footballer, born 2002) =

Welsh footballer (born 2002)

Personal information
- Full name: Joshua John Thomas
- Date of birth: 24 September 2002 (age 24)
- Place of birth: Bridgend, Wales
- Height: 1.72 m (5 ft 8 in)
- Position: Forward

Team information
- Current team: Fleetwood Town
- Number: 11

Youth career
- 2014–2020: Swansea City

Senior career*
Years	Team	Apps	(Gls)
2020–2026	Swansea City	1	(0)
2021	→ Cardiff Met (loan)	4	(0)
2023–2024	→ Port Vale (loan)	11	(0)
2024–2025	→ Bromley (loan)	3	(0)
2025	→ Drogheda United (loan)	12	(3)
2026	→ Derry City (loan)	19	(1)
2026–	Fleetwood Town	0	(0)

International career
2017	Wales U15		
2018	Wales U16	1	(0)
2018	Wales U17	5	(1)
2019	Wales U19	5	(1)
2020	Wales U20	1	(0)
2023–2024	Wales U21	10	(2)
- * Club domestic league appearances and goals as of 21:31, 5 May 2026 (UTC)

Joshua John Thomas (born 24 September 2002) is a Welsh professional footballer who plays as a forward for EFL League Two club Fleetwood Town. He is a former Wales under-21 international.

A pacey forward capped by Wales up to under-21 level, Thomas turned professional at Swansea City in 2020. He joined Cardiff Met on loan in January 2021, though he suffered a serious injury later in the year. He was loaned to Port Vale for the first half of the 2023–24 season, to Bromley for the 2024–25 season. He joined Irish club Drogheda United for the 2025 season and returned to Ireland on loan with Derry City the following year. He signed with Fleetwood Town in June 2026.

== Early life ==
Joshua John Thomas was born in Bridgend on 24 September 2002. He only started playing football at ten, having previously played rugby union.

== Club career ==
=== Swansea City ===
Thomas joined the youth system at Swansea City at the age of 12 and went on to sign a scholarship in 2019, having scored in the under-19's FAW Welsh Youth Cup final victory over The New Saints. He was nominated for the October 2019 Premier League 2 Player of the Month award. He signed professional terms with the club after scoring a hat-trick for the under-23 team in 2020. On 31 January 2021, he joined Cymru Premier club Cardiff Met on loan for the rest of the 2020–21 season, alongside Matthew Blake. However, he was then sidelined for 18 months due to injury, having suffered an ankle deltoid ligament injury in a car accident. He signed an 18-month contract extension in September 2022 after starting the season on a short-term deal. He managed to regain good form for the under-21 team during the 2022–23 campaign, scoring 23 goals.

On 2 August 2023, he joined EFL League One club Port Vale on loan for the 2023–24 season after scoring five goals for the Swans senior team in pre-season. He made his debut three days later, coming on as a 56th-minute substitute for Gavin Massey in a 7–0 defeat at Barnsley. He scored his first senior goal on his home debut at Vale Park, a 3–2 victory over Fleetwood Town in the EFL Cup on 8 August. He tore a muscle on international duty in November 2023, which kept him out of action for close to four weeks. He suffered setbacks on the injury and also became ill over Christmas, causing him to miss an extra month of action. He was recalled by Swansea from his loan spell on 4 January 2024, with Port Vale's director of football David Flitcroft blaming international call-ups and injuries for restricting the player's game time to 15 appearances in all competitions, during which he scored three goals and created two assists.

On 30 August 2024, Thomas joined EFL League Two club Bromley on a season-long loan after having signed a new contract with Swansea earlier in the day. On 17 January 2025, he was loaned out to Drogheda United for their 2025 League of Ireland Premier Division campaign. He scored a total of six goals in 17 appearances in all competitions during his loan spell. He impressed despite missing five months with a quad injury and was then reportedly targeted by Derry City to return to the league on loan.

On 19 January 2026, Thomas returned to the League of Ireland Premier Division on an initial six-month loan deal with Derry City until the end of June. On 18 May 2026, Swansea announced that he was being released at the end of the 2025–26 season. He departed Derry City in June after being dropped from the team by manager Tiernan Lynch due to his "inevitable exit" from the club.

=== Fleetwood Town ===
On 24 June 2026, Thomas signed a two-year deal at League Two club Fleetwood Town.

== International career ==
Thomas has been capped by Wales up to under-21 level.

== Style of play ==
Thomas is a pacey forward.

== Career statistics ==
As of match played 29 May 2026

Appearances and goals by club, season and competition
Club	Season	League			National cup (Note: Includes FA Cup, Welsh Cup, FAI Cup)		League cup (Note: Includes EFL Cup, Welsh League Cup, League of Ireland Cup)		Other		Total	
Club	Season	Division	Apps	Goals	Apps	Goals	Apps	Goals	Apps	Goals	Apps	Goals
Swansea City	2020–21	EFL Championship	0	0	0	0	0	0	0	0	0	0
Swansea City	2021–22	EFL Championship	0	0	0	0	0	0	—		0	0
Swansea City	2022–23	EFL Championship	0	0	0	0	0	0	—		0	0
Swansea City	2023–24	EFL Championship	0	0	0	0	0	0	—		0	0
Swansea City	2024–25	EFL Championship	1	0	0	0	0	0	—		1	0
Swansea City	2025–26	EFL Championship	0	0	0	0	0	0	—		0	0
Swansea City	Total		1	0	0	0	0	0	0	0	1	0
Cardiff Met (loan)	2020–21	Cymru Premier	4	0	0	0	0	0	0	0	4	0
Port Vale (loan)	2023–24	EFL League One	11	0	0	0	3	2	1 (Note: Appearance(s) in the EFL Trophy)	1	15	3
Bromley (loan)	2024–25	EFL League Two	3	0	0	0	—		3	0	6	0
Drogheda United (loan)	2025	LOI Premier Division	12	3	3	1	—		2 (Note: 1 appearance in the President of Ireland's Cup; 1 appearance, 2 goals in the Leinster Senior Cup)	2	17	6
Derry City (loan)	2026	LOI Premier Division	19	1	0	0	—		1 (Note: Appearance in the President of Ireland's Cup)	0	20	1
Fleetwood Town	2026–27	EFL League Two	0	0	0	0	0	0	0	0	0	0
Career total			50	4	3	1	3	2	7	3	63	10
