= Daniel Mahaffy =

English footballer (born 2005)

Personal information
- Date of birth: 15 December 2005 (age 20)
- Place of birth: Liverpool, England
- Position: Midfielder

Team information
- Current team: Burscough

Youth career
- Preston North End
- Marine
- Port Vale

Senior career*
Years	Team	Apps	(Gls)
2023–2024	Port Vale	0	(0)
2023	→ Newcastle Town (loan)	0	(0)
2024	→ AFC Liverpool (loan)	16	(0)
2024–2026	AFC Liverpool	59	(21)
2026–	Burscough	3	(0)
- * Club domestic league appearances and goals as of 19:50, 26 August 2026 (UTC)

Daniel Mahaffy (born 15 December 2005) is an English footballer who plays as a midfielder for North West Counties League Premier Division club Burscough.

Mahaffy was a youth team player with Preston North End, Marine and Port Vale, playing on loan at Newcastle Town and AFC Liverpool. He joined AFC Liverpool for the 2024–25 and 2025–26 seasons, winning the 2026 North West Counties Football League League Challenge Cup. He moved on to Burscough in June 2026.

== Career ==
Mahaffy joined the Port Vale youth system from Marine, having previously been with Preston North End. He captained the youth team. He made his first-team debut on 7 November 2023, coming on as an 87th-minute substitute for Ryan Loft in a 2–1 defeat at Wrexham in the EFL Trophy. On 23 December, he joined Northern Premier League Division One West club Newcastle Town on a work experience loan, alongside youth-team teammates Andrew Buah and Eli Fisher. He did not play a game for Newcastle, however, as the club underwent a change in management. On 4 April 2014, it was confirmed that he had joined North West Counties League Premier Division side AFC Liverpool on a work experience loan. By the end of the 2023–24 season, he had played 16 games for AFC Liverpool, during which the club kept two clean sheets. He was once named as man of the match. He left Vale Park after not being offered a professional contract when his two-year youth scholarship ended.

He subsequently joined AFC Liverpool on a permanent basis and scored 16 goals in 30 league games during the 2024–25 season. He made 36 appearances in the 2025–26 season, scoring six goals. This included an appearance in the League Challenge Cup final victory over West Didsbury & Chorlton. He joined Burscough in June 2026.

== Style of play ==
Mahaffy is a hard-working midfielder with excellent leadership skills.

== Career statistics ==
As of match played 4 May 2026

Appearances and goals by club, season and competition
Club	Season	League			FA Cup		EFL Cup		Other		Total	
Club	Season	Division	Apps	Goals	Apps	Goals	Apps	Goals	Apps	Goals	Apps	Goals
Port Vale	2023–24	EFL League One	0	0	0	0	0	0	1 (Note: Appearances in the EFL Trophy)	0	1	0
Newcastle Town (loan)	2023–24	Northern Premier League; Division One West	0	0	0	0	—		0	0	0	0
AFC Liverpool (loan)	2023–24	North West Counties League; Premier Division	16	0	0	0	—		0	0	16	0
AFC Liverpool	2024–25	North West Counties League; Premier Division	30	16	0	0	—		4 (Note: 1 appearance in the FA Vase, 2 appearances in the Macron Cup and 1 appearance in the Liverpool Senior Cup)	0	34	16
AFC Liverpool	2025–26	North West Counties League; Premier Division	29	5	3	0	—		4 (Note: Appearances in the Macron Cup)	1	36	6
AFC Liverpool	Total		75	21	3	0	0	0	8	1	86	22
Burscough	2026–27	North West Counties League; Premier Division	3	0	1	1	—		0	0	4	1
Career total			78	21	4	1	0	0	9	1	91	23

== Honours ==
AFC Liverpool

- North West Counties Football League League Challenge Cup: 2026
