= Jack Shorrock =

English footballer (born 2007)

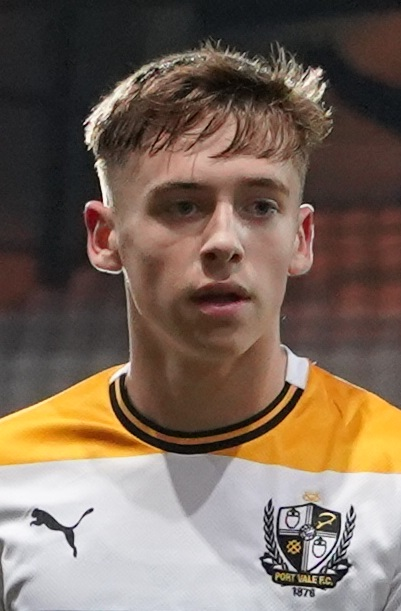
- Shorrock playing for Port Vale in 2023

Personal information
- Full name: Jack John Shorrock
- Date of birth: 28 April 2007 (age 19)
- Place of birth: Stockport, England
- Height: 1.78 m (5 ft 10 in)
- Position: Defender

Team information
- Current team: Port Vale
- Number: 23

Youth career
- Manchester City
- Blackburn Rovers
- 2020–2022: Stockport SFA
- 2022: Port Vale

Senior career*
Years	Team	Apps	(Gls)
2022–	Port Vale	30	(3)
2023	→ Stafford Rangers (loan)	2	(0)
2025–2026	→ Chester (loan)	4	(0)
2026	→ Sligo Rovers (loan)	11	(0)
- * Club domestic league appearances and goals as of 17:40, 5 November 2026 (UTC)

Jack John Shorrock (born 28 April 2007) is an English professional footballer who plays as a midfielder for EFL League Two club Port Vale.

Shorrock became the youngest player in the history of Port Vale in September 2022, aged 15 years and 145 days. He played on loan at Stafford Rangers. He was promoted out of League Two with Port Vale at the end of the 2024–25 season. He joined Chester on loan in October 2025 and then Sligo Rovers in July 2026.

== Career ==
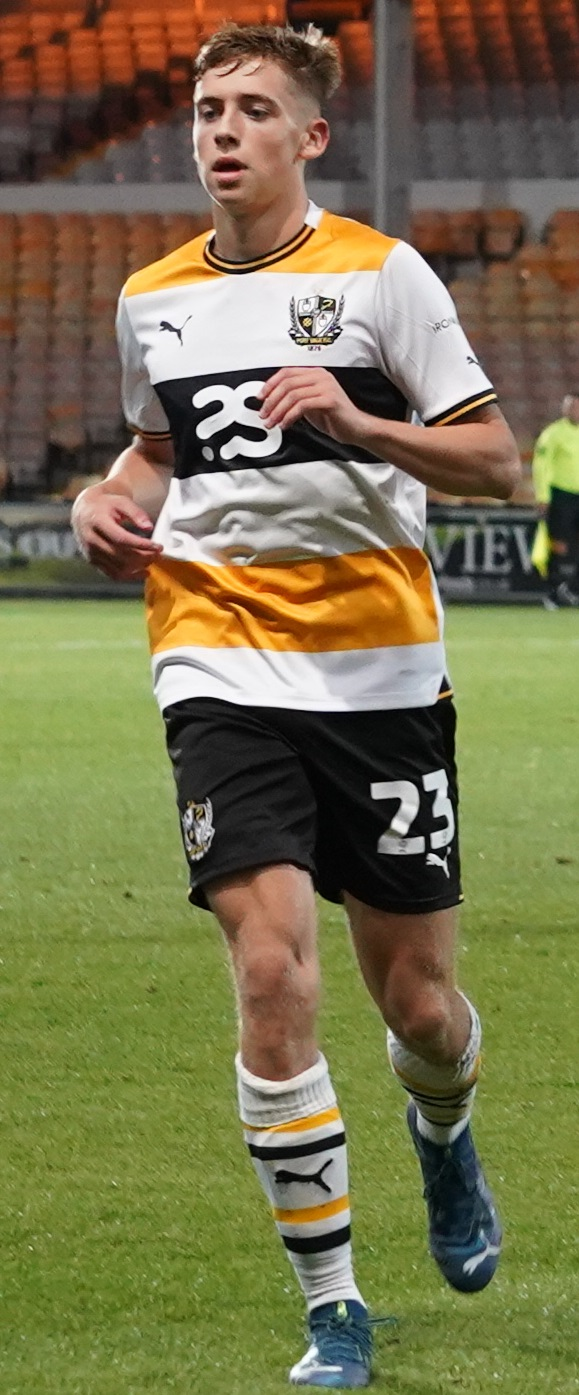
Shorrock playing for Port Vale in 2023

Shorrock was at the academies at Manchester City and Blackburn Rovers and represented the Stockport Schools Football Association (SFA) for two years before signed with Port Vale after impressing on trial. He became the youngest player in the club's history at the age of 15 years and 145 days when he came on as a 75th-minute substitute for David Worrall in a 4–0 victory at Shrewsbury Town in the group stages of the EFL Trophy on 20 September 2022. He made his EFL League One debut on the last day of the 2022–23 season, coming on as substitute in a 3–1 home defeat to Plymouth Argyle on 6 May; aged 16 years and nine days, he became the youngest player to represent the club in league competition since Stuart Chapman in May 1967. He was the top-scorer in Vale's youth team in the 2022–23 season, playing at left-wing-back.

He featured in cup games early in the 2023–24 season, playing as a wing-back and on the left of a back three. On 19 December, he joined Northern Premier League Premier Division club Stafford Rangers on a one-month work experience loan. He was recalled to Vale in time to play in the 3–2 defeat to Barnsley on Boxing Day, scoring a late consolation to make him the youngest goalscorer in the club's history at 16 years and 242 days. He made his league start on 29 December, in a 3–0 win over Blackpool at Vale Park, when he received praise for keeping opposition winger CJ Hamilton quiet. His emergence in the first team was a rare positive in the club's relegation season.

Shorrock signed his first professional contract, a three-year deal, in June 2024. He made his first league appearance of the 2024–25 season on 5 October with a surprise inclusion in the first XI for a 1–0 win at Notts County. Later in the month he said that he did not feel like a "liability" to the team as his all-round game continued to mature. He scored his first goal of the campaign on 25 November, when he opened the scoring from long-range in a 1–1 draw with local rivals Crewe Alexandra. The strike won him the club's Goal of the Season award, which he received alongside the Apprentice of the Season award. He also won the League Two Apprentice of the Season award at the EFL Awards. He made 39 appearances for the club before turning 18, more than any other player in the club's history. He played 17 league games in the campaign, helping the team to secure an automatic promotion place. He signed a new three-year contract in July 2025 as manager Darren Moore believed he "has a really bright future ahead of him".

On 31 October 2025, Shorrock joined National League North side Chester on a six-week loan deal. His opportunities at Vale had been limited by the arrival of veteran wingback Marvin Johnson, as well as Jaheim Headley. The loan was extended until 31 January. He was recalled from his loan on 10 January. He did not play a league game for Vale in the 2025–26 season, which culminated in relegation.

On 28 July 2026, he joined League of Ireland Premier Division club Sligo Rovers on loan for the remainder of the 2026 season as Darren Purse first signing as manager. He played 13 games for Sligo, who were relegated in last place. He was unable to feature for Port Vale until 2 January following his return from The Showgrounds due to international footballing rules.

== Style of play ==
Shorrock is considered an extremely versatile attacking player and began his career as a left-sided wing-back.

== Career statistics ==
As of match played 30 October 2026

Appearances and goals by club, season and competition
Club	Season	League			National cup (Note: Includes FA Cup & FAI Cup)		League cup (Note: Includes EFL Cup)		Other		Total	
Club	Season	Division	Apps	Goals	Apps	Goals	Apps	Goals	Apps	Goals	Apps	Goals
Port Vale	2022–23	League One	1	0	0	0	0	0	1 (Note: Appearance(s) in EFL Trophy)	0	2	0
Port Vale	2023–24	League One	12	1	0	0	1	0	3	0	16	1
Port Vale	2024–25	League Two	17	2	1	0	1	0	3	0	22	2
Port Vale	2025–26	League One	0	0	0	0	1	0	2	1	3	1
Port Vale	2026–27	League Two	0	0	0	0	0	0	0	0	0	0
Port Vale	Total		30	3	1	0	3	0	9	1	43	4
Stafford Rangers (loan)	2023–24	Northern Premier League; Premier Division	2	0	—		—		—		2	0
Chester (loan)	2025–26	National League North	4	0	—		—		1 (Note: Appearance(s) in FA Trophy)	0	5	0
Sligo Rovers (loan)	2026	League of Ireland Premier Division	11	0	2	0	—		—		13	0
Career total			47	3	3	0	3	0	10	1	63	4

== Honours ==
Port Vale

- EFL League Two second-place promotion: 2024–25

Individual

- EFL League Two Apprentice of the Season: 2024–25
