= Ethan Chislett =

South African soccer player (born 1998)

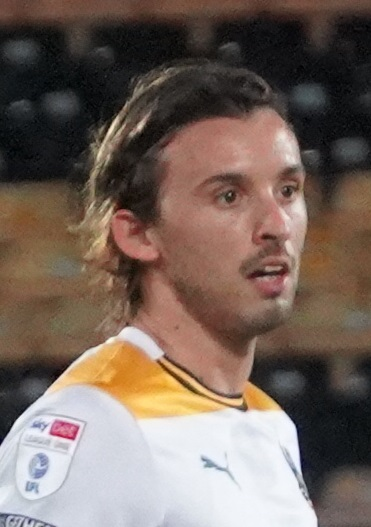
- Chislett with Port Vale in 2023

Personal information
- Full name: Ethan Alexis Chislett
- Date of birth: 11 August 1998 (age 28)
- Place of birth: Durban, South Africa
- Height: 1.78 m (5 ft 10 in)
- Position: Midfielder

Team information
- Current team: Kaizer Chiefs
- Number: 23

Youth career
- 20??–2012: Southampton
- 2012–2013: Aldershot Town
- 2013–2015: Metropolitan Police

Senior career*
Years	Team	Apps	(Gls)
2015–2016	Metropolitan Police	16	(2)
2016	Basingstoke Town	0	(0)
2017–2018	Reddis	19	(5)
2018–2019	Metropolitan Police	10	(2)
2019–2020	Aldershot Town	37	(9)
2020–2023	AFC Wimbledon	100	(13)
2023–2025	Port Vale	68	(13)
2025–	Kaizer Chiefs	6	(0)
- * Club domestic league appearances and goals as of 20:36, 3 May 2026 (UTC)

Ethan Alexis Chislett (born 11 August 1998) is a South African professional soccer player who plays as a midfielder for South African Premiership club Kaizer Chiefs.

Chislett spent his formative years Southampton, Aldershot Town, Metropolitan Police and Basingstoke Town, though developed quickly with a spell in Spain with Reddis. He returned to Metropolitan Police and managed to win a move back to Aldershot Town, where he would score nine National League goals in the 2019–20 season. He was then signed to AFC Wimbledon in August 2020 and played 123 games in three seasons, top-scoring from midfield in the 2022–23 campaign. He joined Port Vale in July 2023 and was promoted out of League Two with the club at the end of the 2024–25 season. He returned to South Africa to sign for Kaizer Chiefs in July 2025.

== Early life ==
Ethan Alexis Chislett was born on 11 August 1998 in Durban, South Africa. His grandfather, Gordon Chislett, represented the South Africa national soccer team. His father, Donovan, played soccer professionally in South Africa and was the head coach of the under-18's at Metropolitan Police until September 2021. The family moved to England in 2005. His younger brother, Josh, also plays football, and the pair founded a company that made personalised shin guards in 2025.

== Career ==
=== Early career ===
Chislett spent time with youth team Guildford Saints before joining the academy at Southampton, where he was released at the age of 14 for being too small. He then spent two years with Aldershot Town, before joining Metropolitan Police, helping the under-18s to reach the fourth round of the FA Youth Cup before he progressed onto the senior team in the Isthmian League Premier Division in 2015. In October 2016, he briefly joined Southern League Premier Division club Basingstoke Town, before moving to Spain, where Chislett played for Reddis and also had a trial at Belgian club Eupen. He scored five goals in 19 Segona Catalana matches for Reddis. He credited his career to his time in Spain, saying the change of culture taught him a lot. He was due to sign with Pobla Mafumet before the club dismissed their manager.

Chislett returned to England to rejoin Metropolitan Police for the 2018–19 season, with manager Gavin Macpherson expressing a wish to promote youth. He played in the FA Cup first round defeat to Newport County on 10 November, with BBC Sport reporting that "Ethan Chislett should have levelled for Met, but headed straight at Joe Day". He was part of the side that won the Southern League Premier Division South play-offs before losing to Tonbridge Angels in the one-off super play-off final, in which Chislett scored the opening goal. On 18 June 2019, he re-joined Aldershot Town in the National League. He said the move up two divisions went well as the "transition was quite smooth". He scored nine goals in 38 games in all competitions in the curtailed 2019–20 season to finish as the club's top-scorer. Manager Danny Searle said the club was proud to have given him a platform to secure a move into the English Football League. Italian club Avellino had also reportedly offered him a deal.

=== AFC Wimbledon ===
On 12 August 2020, Chislett signed for AFC Wimbledon, with manager Glyn Hodges impressed by his creative spark and the prior success of former Met Police signing Nesta Guinness-Walker. He made his debut at Plough Lane in the EFL Trophy against Charlton Athletic on 1 September. He scored his first goal for the Dons in a 2–2 draw with Northampton Town on 12 September; he scored just twenty seconds into the match in what was his EFL League One debut. He set a goal target of ten for the 2020–21 campaign, though would instead score three goals from 36 games. He lost his first-team place under Mark Robinson in the 2021–22 relegation season, though won back a starting place in January following a run of 13 games on the bench.

He was given more freedom to join the attack by new manager Johnnie Jackson in the 2022–23 season, playing on the right side of midfield in a partnership with Harry Pell as the club struggled to adapt to EFL League Two. He was offered a new contract as he finished as the club's top-scorer with eleven goals and three assists in 51 games, also being named as Players’ Player of the Year. He was reported to be a target for Portsmouth, Bolton Wanderers and Wycombe Wanderers.

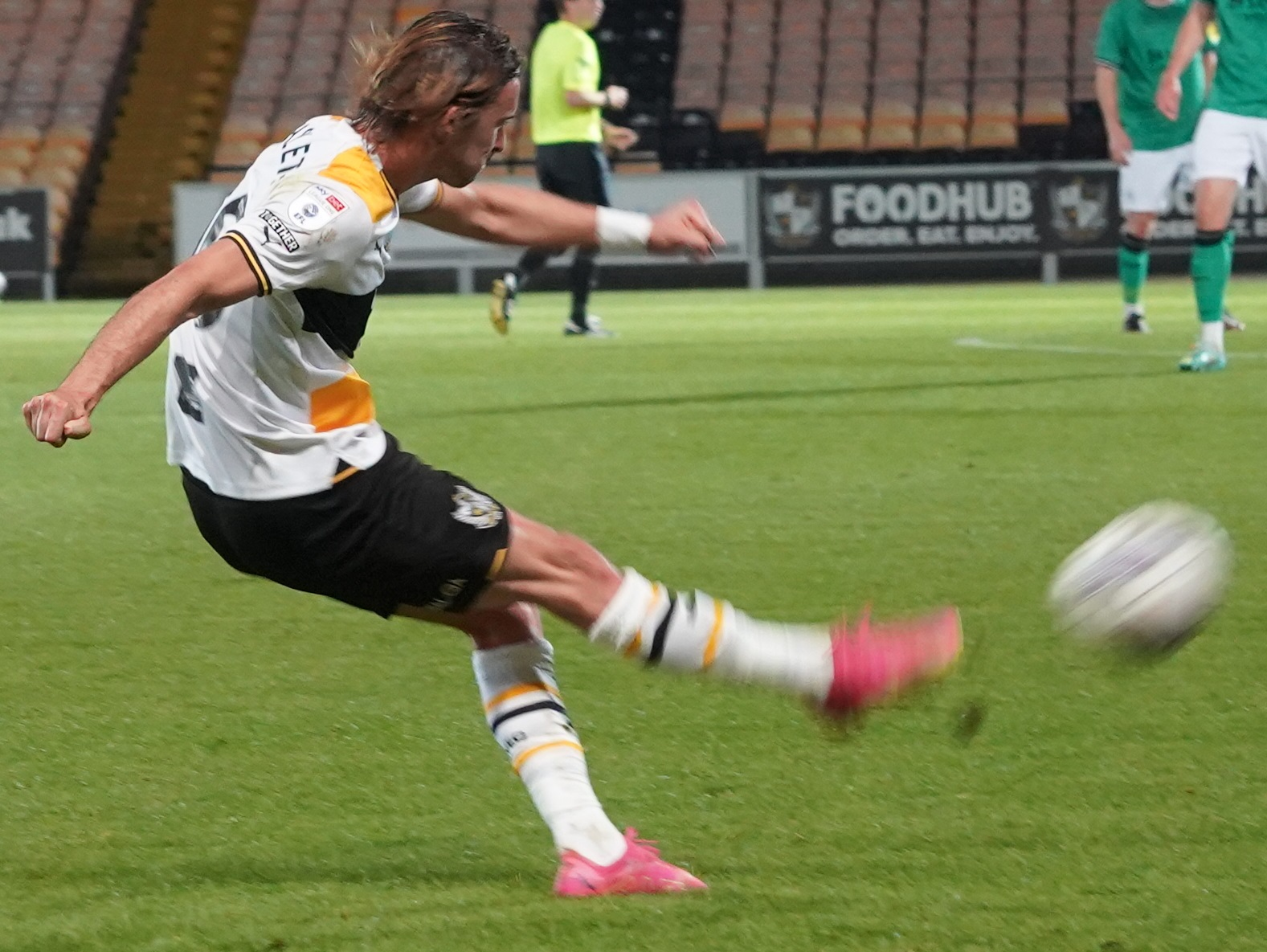
Chislett playing for Port Vale in October 2023

=== Port Vale ===
On 3 July 2023, Chislett signed for League One side Port Vale on a two-year deal, and was hailed by manager Andy Crosby as "an incredible asset". He scored two goals on his home debut at Vale Park, a 3–2 victory over Fleetwood Town in the EFL Cup on 8 August; his first was described in The Sentinel as a "wonderful flighted shot from the edge of the penalty area" and the second was a diving header. The first goal won him the competition's goal of the round award. On 16 December, he scored his first career hat-trick in a 3–2 win over Wigan Athletic, showing the end product that had previously been lacking in what was statistically the club's most effective player by the mid-season stage. The performance saw him named as the League One Player of the Week. Having been dropped by new manager Darren Moore, Chislett won back his first-team place to help the Vale to record back-to-back wins at the end of March. He scored eleven goals from midfield, though could not prevent the club from being relegated at the end of the 2023–24 season.

On 7 September 2024, he scored in a 4–1 win at Newport County and was subsequently named in the EFL League Two Team of the Week. He was away on compassionate leave in January following a family bereavement and was subject to offers on transfer deadline day, which the club rejected. He was released upon the expiry of his contract at the end of the 2024–25 promotion-winning season.

=== Kaizer Chiefs ===
On 1 July 2025, Chislett returned to his home country to sign a three-year deal with South African Premiership club Kaizer Chiefs. His agent said that he rejected a formal offer from Motherwell in the Scottish Premiership to join the Chiefs. He missed the first half of the 2025–26 season due to injury. He said in April that he needed to start scoring for the club, though felt he was getting into good positions already.

== Style of play ==
Chislett is a midfielder with flair and elegance on the ball, although he is weak at heading the ball. David Flitcroft, the director of football at Port Vale, said that Chislett "is a player that loves to find space in between midfield players and defenders... his timing of runs into the box to create goalscoring opportunities is outstanding". He is also an accomplished free kick taker.

== Career statistics ==
As of match played 29 April 2026

Appearances and goals by club, season and competition
Club	Season	League			National cup (Note: Includes FA Cup, Copa del Rey, Nedbank Cup)		League cup (Note: Includes Football League Cup, Carling Knockout Cup)		Other		Total	
Club	Season	Division	Apps	Goals	Apps	Goals	Apps	Goals	Apps	Goals	Apps	Goals
Metropolitan Police	2015–16	Isthmian League; Premier Division	12	2	0	0	—		1 (Note: Appearance(s) in Alan Turvey Trophy)	0	13	2
Metropolitan Police	2016–17	Isthmian League; Premier Division	4	0	0	0	—		0	0	4	0
Metropolitan Police	Total		16	2	0	0	0	0	1	0	17	2
Basingstoke Town	2016–17	Southern League; Premier Division	0	0	0	0	—		1 (Note: Appearance(s) in Southern League Cup)	0	1	0
Reddis	2017–18	Segona Catalana	19	5	0	0	—		0	0	19	5
Metropolitan Police	2018–19	Southern League; Premier Division South	10	2	6	3	0	0	2 (Note: 1 appearance in FA Trophy, 1 appearance and 1 goal in play-offs)	1	18	6
Aldershot Town	2019–20	National League	37	9	1	0	0	0	0	0	38	9
AFC Wimbledon	2020–21	EFL League One	27	2	2	0	1	0	6 (Note: Appearance(s) in EFL Trophy)	1	36	3
AFC Wimbledon	2021–22	EFL League One	29	2	2	0	2	0	3	0	36	2
AFC Wimbledon	2022–23	EFL League Two	44	9	2	2	1	0	4	0	51	11
AFC Wimbledon	Total		100	13	6	2	4	0	13	1	123	16
Port Vale	2023–24	EFL League One	43	9	4	0	4	2	3	0	54	11
Port Vale	2024–25	EFL League Two	25	4	0	0	0	0	3	0	28	4
Port Vale	Total		68	13	4	0	4	2	6	0	82	15
Kaizer Chiefs	2025–26	South African Premiership	6	0	0	0	0	0	0	0	6	0
Kaizer Chiefs	2026–27	South African Premiership	0	0	0	0	0	0	0	0	0	0
Kaizer Chiefs	Total		6	0	0	0	0	0	0	0	6	0
Career total			256	44	17	5	8	2	23	2	304	53

== Honours ==
Port Vale

- EFL League Two second-place promotion: 2024–25
