= James Plant =

English footballer (born 2004)

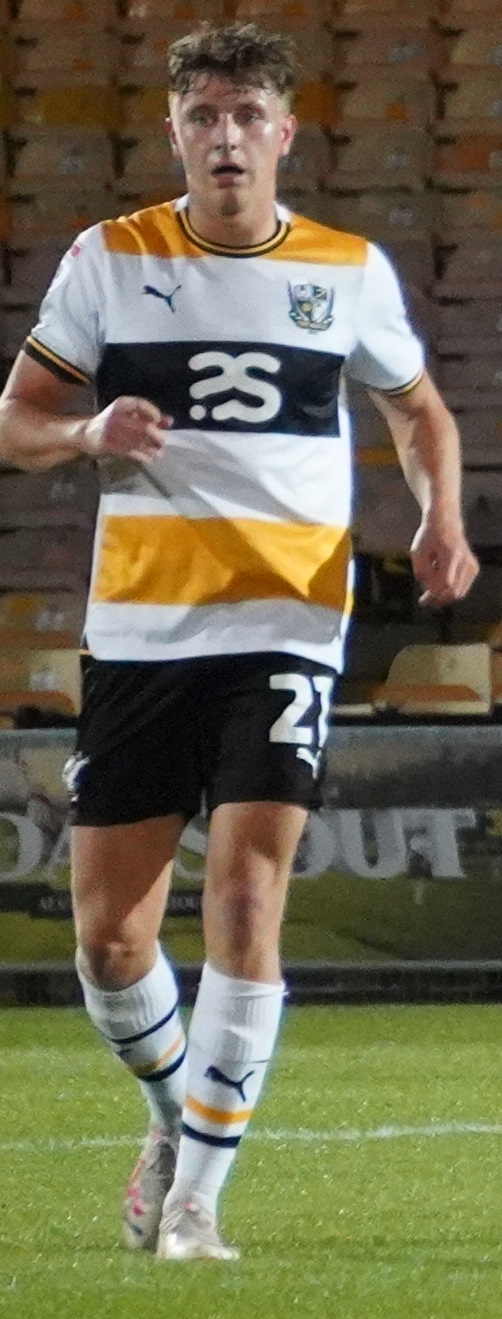
- Plant in 2023

Personal information
- Full name: James John Plant
- Date of birth: 3 November 2004 (age 22)
- Place of birth: Werrington, Staffordshire, England
- Height: 1.74 m (5 ft 9 in)
- Position: Winger

Team information
- Current team: Tranmere Rovers
- Number: 26

Youth career
- 2013–2022: Port Vale

Senior career*
| Years | Team | Apps | (Gls) |
| 2022–2026 | Port Vale | 33 | (2) |
| 2022 | → Nantwich Town (loan) | 6 | (0) |
| 2023 | → Salisbury (loan) | 10 | (3) |
| 2024 | → Yeovil Town (loan) | 10 | (2) |
| 2025 | → Yeovil Town (loan) | 3 | (0) |
| 2025–2026 | → Yeovil Town (loan) | 20 | (0) |
| 2026– | Tranmere Rovers | 14 | (1) |
- * Club domestic league appearances and goals as of 12:53, 3 May 2026 (UTC)

James John Plant (born 3 November 2004) is an English professional footballer who plays as a winger for EFL League Two club Tranmere Rovers.

Plant made his first-team debut at Port Vale in August 2022 and turned professional at the club in April 2023. He went on to have loan spells at Nantwich Town, Salisbury and Yeovil Town. He made a permanent transfer to Tranmere Rovers in January 2026.

== Early life ==
James John Plant was born on 3 November 2004 in Werrington, Staffordshire; his grandfather, Ian Powell, ran a food van selling spit-roasted chickens from his blue van in Stoke-on-Trent city centre for 40 years before his retirement in 2023. He played for Werrington Tigers as a small child and had a trial with Crewe Alexandra before he joined Port Vale at under-nine level. His elder brother, Matthew, played non-League football for Abbey Hulton United.

== Career ==
=== Port Vale ===
Plant made his senior debut for Port Vale in a 1–0 victory over Stockport County in an EFL Trophy group stage game at Vale Park on 30 August 2022; he came on as an 86th-minute substitute for Tommy McDermott. On 24 September 2022, he joined Northern Premier League Premier Division club Nantwich Town on a work experience loan, having been recommended to joint-manager Ritchie Sutton, who said Plant would bring "energy, enthusiasm, quality and a great attitude" to the "Dabbers" squad. Plant made his debut later that day, and was named as man of the match in a 2–0 defeat at Whitby Town. He was praised by "Dabbers" supporters for his "creative playing style and energetic performances". He found the experience tough and one that he learned a lot from. On 31 January 2023, he joined Southern League Premier Division South club Salisbury on a work experience loan, alongside Tommy McDermott. He was named as Player of the Match in each of his first two appearances for Salisbury and scored on his fourth appearance, a 3–0 win at Hanwell Town. He was named as the club's Player of the Month for February. He received a career first red-card during a 3–0 victory at Metropolitan Police on 4 March. On 30 March, it was announced that the loan deal had been extended until the end of the 2022–23 season. He made his League One debut for Port Vale on 10 April, coming on as a 69th-minute substitute for Gavin Massey in a 0–0 draw with Oxford United. He started his first League One game eight days later, impressing alongside Tom Conlon in central midfield in a 2–1 defeat at Ipswich Town after Tom Pett was ruled out due to injury. He signed his first professional (two-year) contract in April 2023; David Flitcroft, the club's director of football, said that "his ability, attitude, character and commitment to getting better is outstanding and is now a benchmark for all players who come through the academy". Plant scored his first goal in the EFL in a 3–2 loss at Charlton Athletic on 29 April.

Plant began the 2023–24 season strongly and was teasingly nicknamed "Son of Crosby" by his teammates due to manager Andy Crosby's fulsome praise for his attitude and performances. He signed a new contract in November, before turning 19, to keep him at the club until at least 2027. However, he dislocated his shoulder the following month and was ruled out of action for up to 12 weeks. He made his return in a 3–0 defeat at Derby County on 2 March, where he was played out of position at left-wing-back. He was praised by manager Darren Moore after again being played out of position on 10 April, this time playing at right-back against Ephron Mason-Clark in a 3–0 defeat at Peterborough United.

On 27 September 2024, Plant joined National League side Yeovil Town on loan until January 2025. He provided the assist in a 1–0 win over Dagenham & Redbridge at Huish Park on 5 October, in what was his second game for the Glovers. Manager Mark Cooper said that "he showed real quality today" and was like "gold dust" due to his versatility. He scored two goals in eleven games for the "Glovers" before he sustained a hamstring injury and returned to Vale on 19 December. On 3 February, he returned on loan to Yeovil Town until the end of the 2024–25 season. However, a hamstring injury saw the loan spell cut short after three weeks.

On 20 August 2025, Plant returned to National League side Yeovil Town on loan until 9 January 2026. He was sidelined with a shoulder injury in October, which led the club to bring in George Nurse on loan as cover down the left side. He retained his first-team place despite Yeovil cycling between different managers – Mark Cooper, Richard Dryden, Danny Webb, and Billy Rowley.

=== Tranmere Rovers ===
On 28 January 2026, Plant left Port Vale to sign for League Two side Tranmere Rovers on an 18-month deal. He had played under manager Andy Crosby at Port Vale. He started nine league games for Rovers 2025–26 in the second half of the season, also coming off the bench in the last day draw that helped secure their Football League safety.

== Style of play ==
Plant is a player capable of operating as a forward, central midfielder, or wing-back. He has frequently been noted by scouts and managers for his composure and professional temperament.

== Career statistics ==
As of match played 22 September 2026

Appearances and goals by club, season and competition
| Club | Season | League | | | FA Cup | | EFL Cup | | Other | | Total | |
| Club | Season | Division | Apps | Goals | Apps | Goals | Apps | Goals | Apps | Goals | Apps | Goals |
|---|---|---|---|---|---|---|---|---|---|---|---|---|
| Port Vale | 2022–23 | EFL League One | 6 | 2 | 0 | 0 | 0 | 0 | 3 (Note: Appearances in the EFL Trophy.) | 0 | 9 | 2 |
| Port Vale | 2023–24 | EFL League One | 26 | 0 | 3 | 0 | 4 | 0 | 2 | 0 | 35 | 0 |
| Port Vale | 2024–25 | EFL League Two | 1 | 0 | 0 | 0 | 1 | 0 | 2 | 0 | 4 | 0 |
| Port Vale | 2025–26 | EFL League One | 0 | 0 | 0 | 0 | 1 | 0 | 0 | 0 | 1 | 0 |
| Port Vale | Total | | 33 | 2 | 3 | 0 | 6 | 0 | 7 | 0 | 49 | 2 |
| Nantwich Town (loan) | 2022–23 | Northern Premier League; Premier Division | 6 | 0 | 0 | 0 | — | | 1 (Note: Appearances in the FA Trophy.) | 0 | 7 | 0 |
| Salisbury (loan) | 2022–23 | Southern League; Premier Division South | 10 | 3 | 0 | 0 | — | | 0 | 0 | 10 | 3 |
| Yeovil Town (loan) | 2024–25 | National League | 13 | 2 | 0 | 0 | — | | 1 | 0 | 14 | 2 |
| Yeovil Town (loan) | 2025–26 | National League | 20 | 0 | 0 | 0 | — | | 0 | 0 | 20 | 0 |
| Yeovil Town (loan) | Total | | 33 | 2 | 0 | 0 | 0 | 0 | 1 | 0 | 34 | 2 |
| Tranmere Rovers | 2025–26 | EFL League Two | 14 | 1 | — | | — | | — | | 14 | 1 |
| Tranmere Rovers | 2026–27 | EFL League Two | 0 | 0 | 0 | 0 | 0 | 0 | 1 | 0 | 1 | 0 |
| Tranmere Rovers | Total | | 14 | 1 | 0 | 0 | 0 | 0 | 1 | 0 | 15 | 1 |
| Career total | | | 96 | 8 | 3 | 0 | 6 | 0 | 10 | 0 | 115 | 8 |
