= Derek Agyakwa =

Dutch association football player

Personal information
- Full name: Derek Emmanuel Adjei Agyakwa
- Date of birth: 19 December 2001 (age 24)
- Place of birth: Amsterdam, Netherlands
- Height: 1.84 m (6 ft 0 in)
- Position: Defender

Team information
- Current team: Volos
- Number: 99

Youth career
- Amsterdam
- 2017–2019: Twente

Senior career*
| Years | Team | Apps | (Gls) |
| 2020–2022 | Watford | 0 | (0) |
| 2020–2021 | → Como (loan) | 4 | (0) |
| 2022–2023 | Port Vale | 1 | (0) |
| 2022 | → Chorley (loan) | 0 | (0) |
| 2024–2026 | Iberia 1999 | 67 | (4) |
| 2026– | Volos | 6 | (1) |
- * Club domestic league appearances and goals as of 21:00, 13 October 2026 (UTC)

Derek Emmanuel Adjei Agyakwa (born 19 December 2001) is a Dutch professional footballer who plays as a defender for Greek Super League club Volos.

Agyakwa began his career in the Netherlands as a youth team player with Twente, and spent January 2020 until June 2022 contracted to English club Watford, whilst spending the first half of the 2020–21 season on loan at Como in Italy. He then moved on to Port Vale and was loaned out to Chorley in September 2022. He joined Georgian club Iberia 1999 in February 2024, helping them to the Erovnuli Liga title in the 2024 and 2025 seasons, and playing in the 2025 Georgian Cup final. He joined Greek club Volos in January 2026.

== Career ==
=== Watford ===
Agyakwa joined Twente from local club Amsterdam but was released after two years in Twente's academy. He joined English Premier League club Watford on an initial six-month contract after passing a two-week trial in January 2020. His contract was extended by a year in June. On 16 September 2020, Agyakwa made his professional debut, playing the first half in Watford's EFL Cup victory over Oxford United. On 5 October, Agyakwa signed a new two-year contract with Watford and was loaned out to Italian Serie C side Como for the 2020–21 season. He played his first match for Como on 20 October in a 3–2 win against Lucchese, and received a yellow card for what he later claimed had been a dive by the opposition forward. He was sent off during a 2–2 draw with Olbia at the Stadio Giuseppe Sinigaglia on 25 November. In January 2021, the loan was ended early due to a mutually agreed termination. Having only appeared in a match-day squad as an unused substitute in one FA Cup game throughout the 2021–22 season, Agyakwa left Vicarage Road after being released upon the expiry of his contract.

=== Port Vale ===
On 26 July 2022, Agyakwa signed for EFL League One club Port Vale following a successful trial period. On 13 September 2022, he joined National League North club Chorley on a short-term loan deal, where manager Andy Preece felt he could "add vital competition and depth" to the squad. He featured in just one FA Cup game for the "Magpies", before returning to Vale Park to make his debut for "Valiants" in a 2–0 victory over Wolverhampton Wanderers U21 in the EFL Trophy on 18 October. He made his league debut on 18 March, coming on for Will Forrester 35 minutes into a 3–2 home defeat to Burton Albion. David Flitcroft, the club's director of football, confirmed that the player's contract would not be renewed beyond June 2023.

=== Iberia 1999 ===
In February 2024, Agyakwa travelled to Georgia to join Erovnuli Liga club Iberia 1999. He played 33 league games as the club won the 2024 league title. They retained their title in 2025, with Agyakwa featuring 39 times in all competitions. He scored in the final of the 2025 Georgian Cup, which ended in a 3–1 defeat to Dila.

=== Volos ===
On 2 January 2026, Agyakwa signed for Greek Super League club Volos. He played three games in the second half of the 2025–26 season.

== Personal life ==
Born in the Netherlands, Agyakwa is of Ghanaian descent.

== Career statistics ==
As of end of the 2025–26 season

Appearances and goals by club, season and competition
| Club | Season | League | | | National cup (Note: Includes FA Cup, Coppa Italia, Georgian Cup, Greek Cup) | | League cup (Note: Includes EFL Cup) | | Other | | Total | |
| Club | Season | Division | Apps | Goals | Apps | Goals | Apps | Goals | Apps | Goals | Apps | Goals |
|---|---|---|---|---|---|---|---|---|---|---|---|---|
| Watford | 2020–21 | Championship | 0 | 0 | 0 | 0 | 2 | 0 | — | | 2 | 0 |
| Watford | 2021–22 | Premier League | 0 | 0 | 0 | 0 | 0 | 0 | — | | 0 | 0 |
| Watford | Total | | 0 | 0 | 0 | 0 | 2 | 0 | 0 | 0 | 2 | 0 |
| Como (loan) | 2020–21 | Serie C | 4 | 0 | 0 | 0 | — | | 0 | 0 | 4 | 0 |
| Port Vale | 2022–23 | League One | 1 | 0 | 0 | 0 | 0 | 0 | 1 (Note: Appearances in the EFL Trophy) | 0 | 2 | 0 |
| Chorley (loan) | 2022–23 | National League North | 0 | 0 | 1 | 0 | — | | 0 | 0 | 1 | 0 |
| Iberia 1999 | 2024 | Erovnuli Liga | 33 | 1 | 1 | 0 | — | | 2 (Note: Appearances in the Georgian Super Cup) | 0 | 36 | 1 |
| Iberia 1999 | 2025 | Erovnuli Liga | 34 | 3 | 3 | 1 | — | | 2 | 0 | 39 | 4 |
| Iberia 1999 | Total | | 67 | 4 | 4 | 1 | 0 | 0 | 4 | 0 | 75 | 5 |
| Volos | 2025–26 | Super League Greece | 3 | 0 | — | | — | | — | | 3 | 0 |
| Volos | 2026–27 | Super League Greece | 0 | 0 | 0 | 0 | — | | — | | 0 | 0 |
| Volos | Total | | 0 | 0 | 0 | 0 | 0 | 0 | 0 | 0 | 0 | 0 |
| Career total | | | 75 | 4 | 5 | 1 | 2 | 0 | 5 | 0 | 87 | 5 |

== Honours ==
Iberia 1999

- Erovnuli Liga: 2024, 2025
- Georgian Cup runner-up: 2025
