= Sammy Robinson =

English footballer (born 2002)

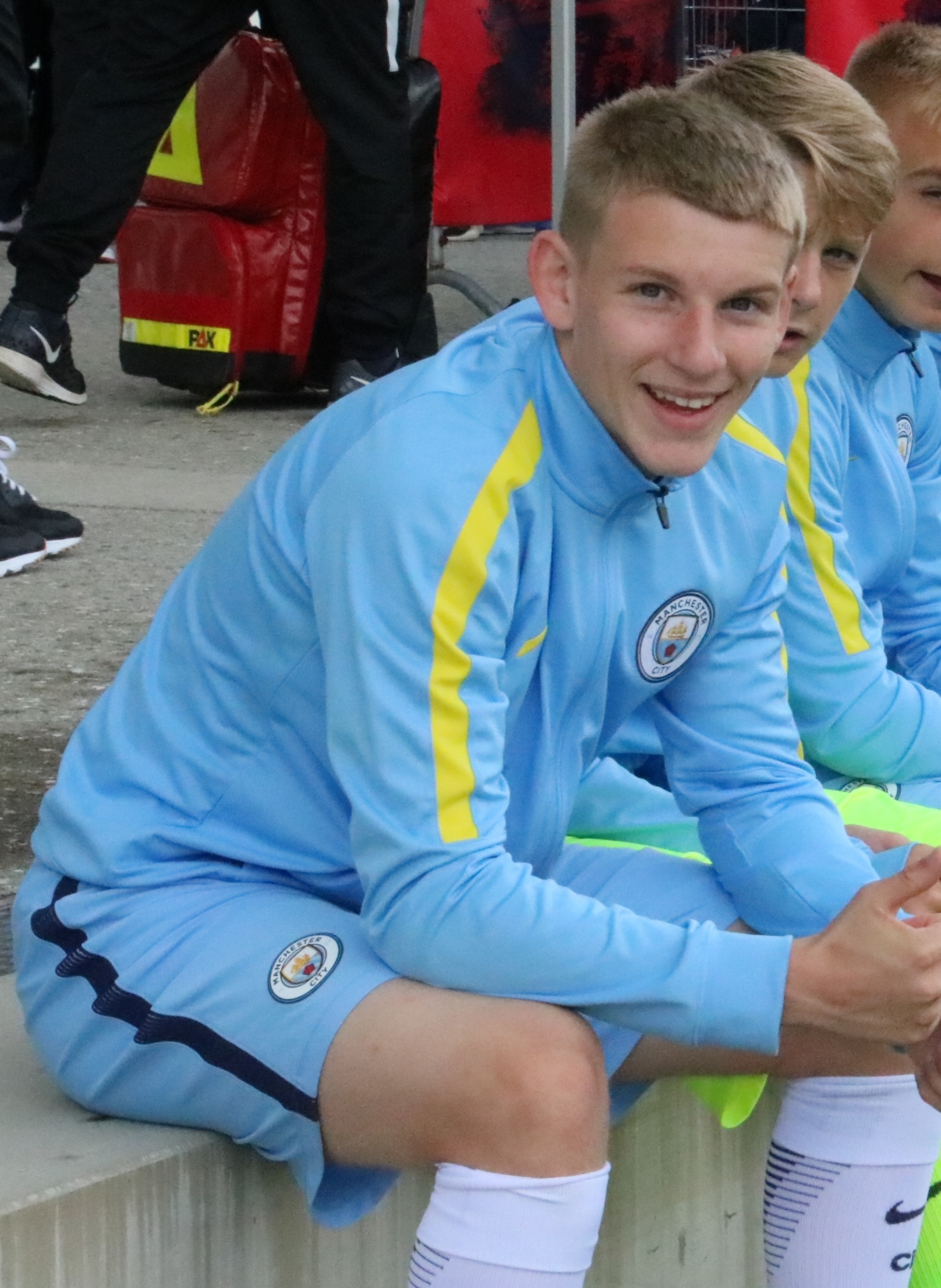
- Robinson in 2016

Personal information
- Full name: Samson Alfie Philip Robinson
- Date of birth: 9 January 2002 (age 24)
- Place of birth: Cheltenham, England
- Position: Defender

Team information
- Current team: Buxton
- Number: 27

Youth career
- 20??–2016: Leeds United
- 2016–2022: Manchester City

Senior career*
| Years | Team | Apps | (Gls) |
| 2022–2023 | Port Vale | 23 | (0) |
| 2023–2024 | Kidderminster Harriers | 21 | (0) |
| 2024–2025 | Hereford | 33 | (1) |
| 2025– | Buxton | 39 | (0) |

International career
| 2016 | England U15 | 20 | (0) |
| 2017 | England U16 | 3 | (0) |
| 2019 | England U17 | 3 | (0) |
- * Club domestic league appearances and goals as of 20:18, 21 November 2026 (UTC)

Samson Alfie Philip Robinson (born 9 January 2002) is an English professional footballer who plays as a defender for National League North club Buxton.

A former England youth international, he joined Port Vale from Manchester City in January 2022. He helped the club to win promotion out of League Two via the play-offs in four months later. Released by the Vale in June 2023, he joined non-League side Kidderminster Harriers three months later. He signed with Hereford in July 2024 and was named the club's Player of the Year for the 2024–25 campaign. He joined Buxton in June 2025.

== Club career ==
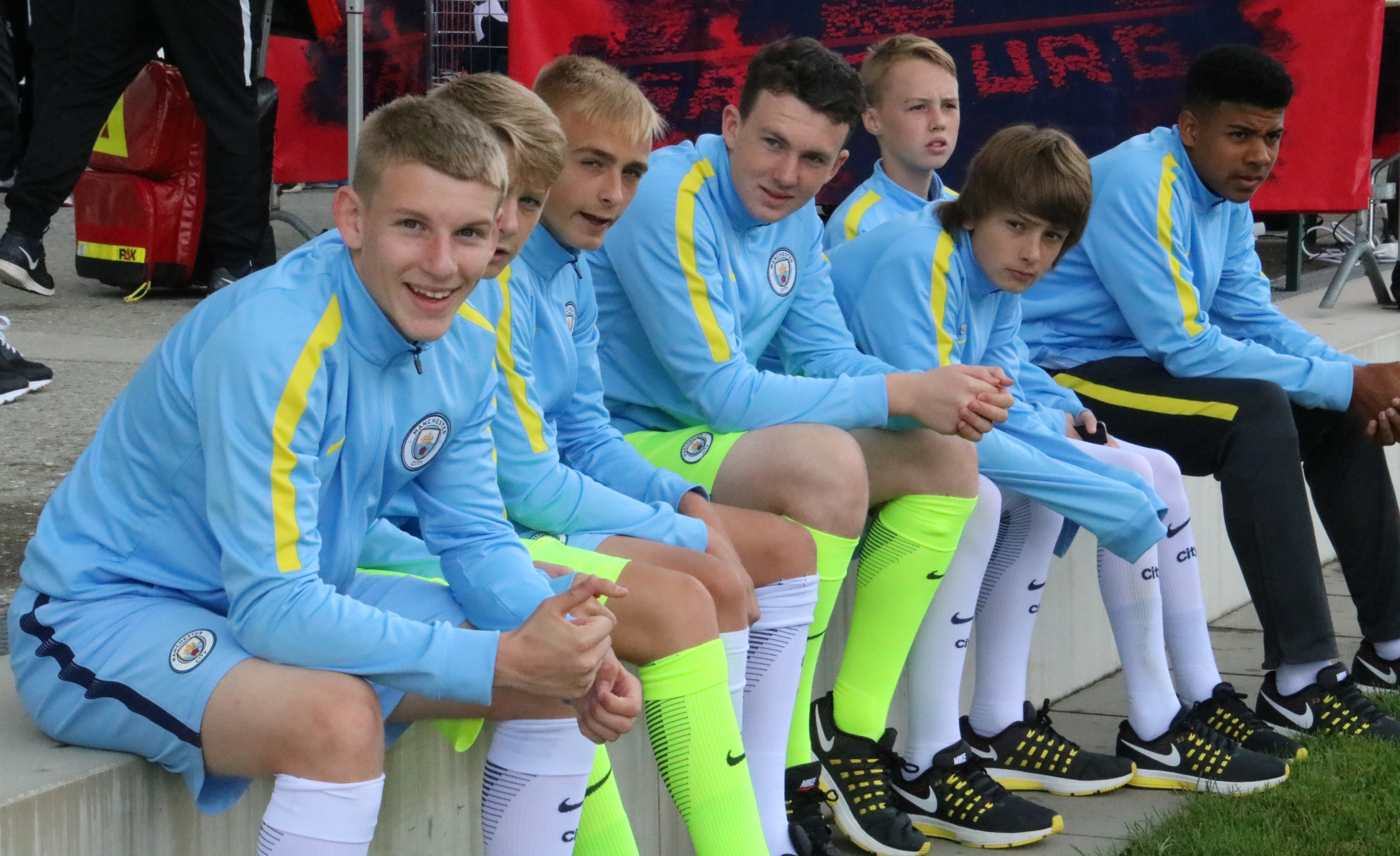
Robinson (first left) pictured during his time at Manchester City in 2016.

=== Early career ===
After playing for Leeds United, Robinson joined Manchester City at the age of 14. He was originally a striker at Leeds, was then moved to centre-back at Manchester City and then later to central midfield, before he finally settled at right-back. He represented the Manchester City Academy team in the EFL Trophy on 24 September 2019, in a 2–1 win at Bradford City. He was promoted to the Elite Development Squad in January 2020. He was given the squad number 77. He was sidelined after picking up what coach Brian Barry-Murphy described as a "really bad injury" in August 2020. He made a total of 16 appearances in the Professional Development League, scoring one goal and providing two assists.

=== Port Vale ===
Robinson signed an 18-month contract with League Two club Port Vale on 31 January 2022, after manager Darrell Clarke needed cover for the injured Lewis Cass and with James Gibbons; director of football David Flitcroft cited a desire to build a relationship with Manchester City; City retained a sell-on clause. He made his debut at Vale Park on 20 March, coming on as a substitute for David Worrall in a 2–0 win over Sutton United. He was an unused substitute as Vale secured promotion out of the play-offs with victory over Mansfield Town in the final at Wembley Stadium. He made his full debut on 6 August, in a 4–0 defeat at fellow League One newcomers Exeter City, and despite giving away a penalty he received praise from Clarke, who said Robinson was "unfairly penalised". Speaking three months later, Robinson said his focus was on improving the defensive aspect of his game. On 15 April, he was sent off for two bookable offences in a 3–2 defeat at Lincoln City despite only coming on as a half-time substitute; he was defended by opposition manager Mark Kennedy, who said that Robinson had been a "little bit emotional and rash" but that "he has had a really tough start in his life and he is an incredible person". Flitcroft confirmed that the player's contract would not be renewed beyond June 2023.

=== Kidderminster Harriers ===
On 29 September 2023, Robinson joined Kidderminster Harriers of the National League. He played 22 games in the 2023–24 season. Kidderminster Harriers were relegated at the end of the 2023–24 season.

=== Hereford ===
On 31 July 2024, Robinson joined National League North club Hereford. He was voted Hereford's player of the month for September, and signed a contract with the club in October. He played 36 games in the 2024–25 season, scoring one goal, and was named as the club's Player of the Season. On 6 June, Robinson announced on X that he had left the club owing to "location and family commitments".

=== Buxton ===
On 14 June 2025, Robinson joined National League North club Buxton. He said he joined the club because of the attractive style of football they played. He played 31 league games in the 2025–26 season.

== International career ==
Robinson won a total of 26 caps representing England at under-15, under-16 and under-17 level.

== Style of play ==
Robinson has been described as a "whole-hearted central defender... who is comfortable in possession". He can play in central defence or at right-back.

== Personal life ==
Robinson is a Leeds United supporter.

== Career statistics ==
As of match played 21 November 2026

Appearances and goals by club, season and competition
| Club | Season | League | | | FA Cup | | EFL Cup | | Other | | Total | |
| Club | Season | Division | Apps | Goals | Apps | Goals | Apps | Goals | Apps | Goals | Apps | Goals |
|---|---|---|---|---|---|---|---|---|---|---|---|---|
| Manchester City U23 | 2019–20 | — | | | — | | — | | 1 (Note: Appearance(s) in EFL Trophy) | 0 | 1 | 0 |
| Manchester City U23 | 2020–21 | — | | | — | | — | | 2 | 0 | 2 | 0 |
| Manchester City U23 | 2021–22 | — | | | — | | — | | 1 | 0 | 1 | 0 |
| Manchester City U23 | Total | | 0 | 0 | 0 | 0 | 0 | 0 | 4 | 0 | 4 | 0 |
| Port Vale | 2021–22 | League Two | 1 | 0 | — | | — | | 0 | 0 | 1 | 0 |
| Port Vale | 2022–23 | League One | 22 | 0 | 1 | 0 | 1 | 0 | 3 | 0 | 27 | 0 |
| Port Vale | Total | | 23 | 0 | 1 | 0 | 1 | 0 | 3 | 0 | 28 | 0 |
| Kidderminster Harriers | 2023–24 | National League | 21 | 0 | 2 | 0 | — | | 1 (Note: Appearance(s) in FA Trophy) | 0 | 24 | 0 |
| Hereford | 2024–25 | National League North | 33 | 1 | 3 | 0 | — | | 0 | 0 | 36 | 1 |
| Buxton | 2025–26 | National League North | 31 | 0 | 2 | 0 | — | | 2 (Note: Appearance(s) in play-offs) | 0 | 35 | 0 |
| Buxton | 2026–27 | National League North | 8 | 0 | 0 | 0 | — | | 0 | 0 | 8 | 0 |
| Buxton | Total | | 39 | 0 | 2 | 0 | 0 | 0 | 2 | 0 | 43 | 0 |
| Career total | | | 116 | 1 | 8 | 0 | 1 | 0 | 10 | 0 | 135 | 1 |

== Honours ==
Port Vale

- EFL League Two play-offs: 2022

Individual

- Hereford Player of the Year: 2024–25
