= 2022–23 Port Vale F.C. season =

Port Vale F.C.
2022–23 season
- Owner: Synsol Holdings Limited
- Chair: Carol Shanahan
- Manager: Darrell Clarke (until 17 April); Andy Crosby (interim from 17 April)
- Stadium: Vale Park
- League One: 18th (49 points)
- FA Cup: First Round (eliminated by Exeter City)
- EFL Cup: First Round (eliminated by Rotherham United)
- EFL Trophy: Round of 16 (eliminated by Salford City)
- Player of the Year: Nathan Smith
- Top goalscorer: League: Ellis Harrison (11); All: Ellis Harrison (11)
- Highest home attendance: 11,998 vs. Plymouth Argyle, 7 May 2023
- Lowest home attendance: 1,090 vs. Wolverhampton Wanderers U21, 18 October 2022
- Average home league attendance: 7,681
- Biggest win: 4–0 vs. Shrewsbury Town, 20 September 2022
- Biggest defeat: 0–4 (twice)
Home colours	Away colours	Third colours

The 2022–23 season was Port Vale's 111th season in the English Football League, and first season back in EFL League One following promotion out of EFL League Two with victory in the 2022 EFL League Two play-off final.

In a compacted pre-season, the club signed seven players permanently and brought in a further six on loan, whilst six first-team players were moved on. Having won their opening game on 30 July, Vale picked up four points from five games in August, whilst they exited the EFL Cup in the first round. Summer signing Ellis Harrison soon found his form, though, scoring five goals from seven league games, whilst the Vale qualified for the knock-out stages of the EFL Trophy with one group game to spare. Despite facing a difficult run of fixtures in October, they picked up ten points to firmly establish themselves in mid-table. They added four points from four league games in November and also advanced into the Round of 16 of the EFL Trophy. Vale ended 2022 in ninth place, though were knocked out of the EFL Trophy by Salford City.

Port Vale had a quiet January transfer window, with two loan signings coming and three senior players outgoing permanently. They picked up just four points from seven league games in February but stabilised in March as attacking talent returned to fitness. However, one point from four games saw manager Darrell Clarke sacked on 17 April, with assistant manager Andy Crosby given the task of keeping the club out of the relegation zone as interim manager. The club's final total of 49 points was enough to secure an 18th-place finish, four points above the relegation zone, and Crosby was given the job permanently.

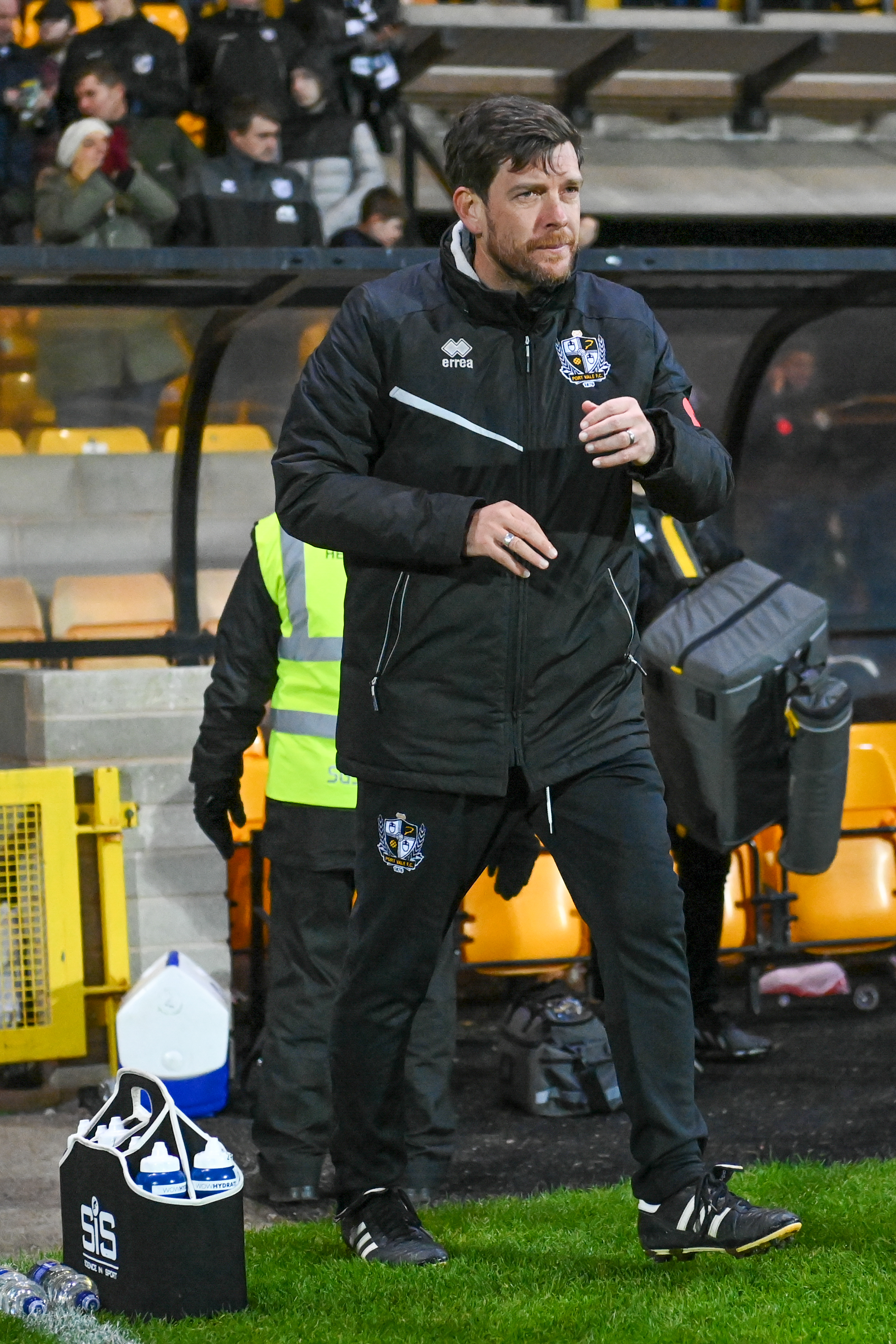
Manager Darrell Clarke was sacked on 17 April.

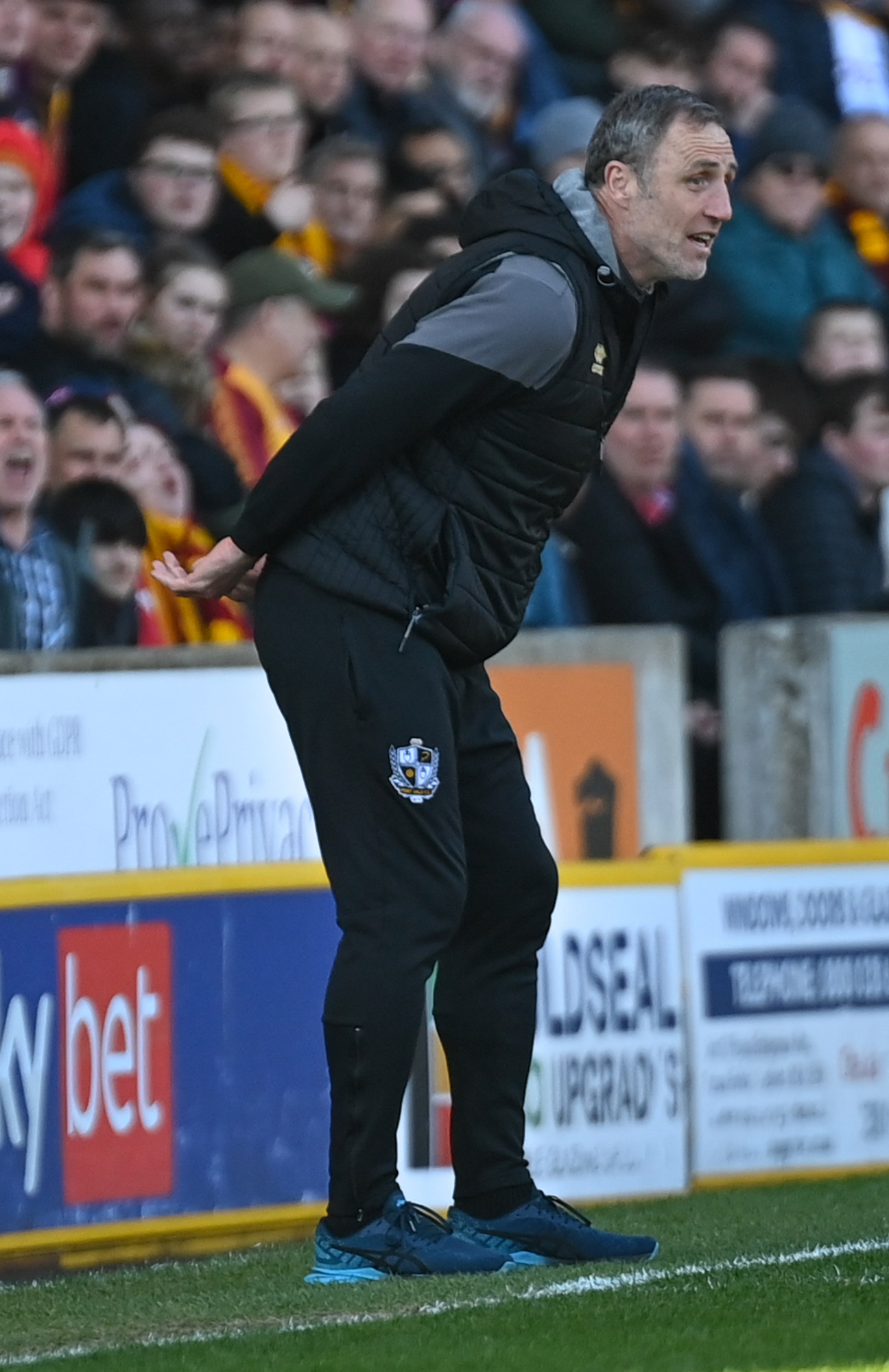
Andy Crosby stepped in as interim manager for the final four games.

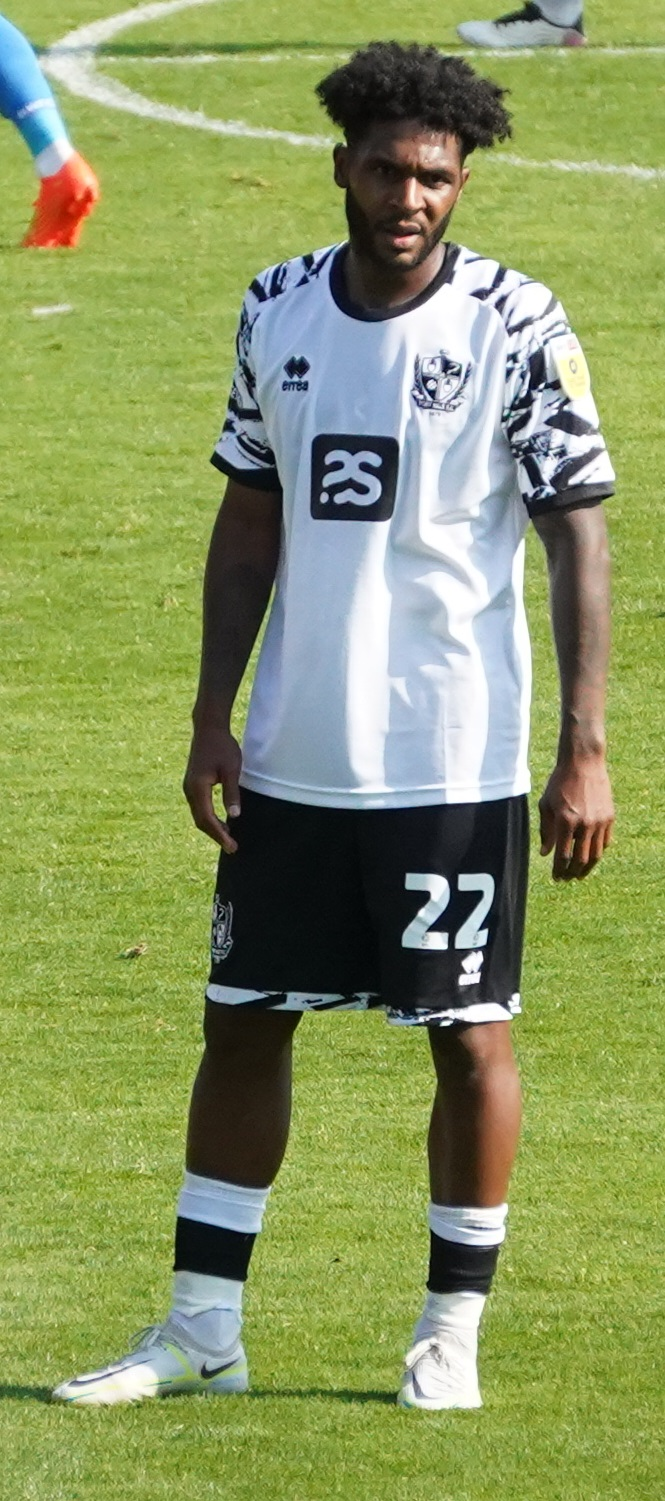
Top scorer Ellis Harrison hit 11 goals.

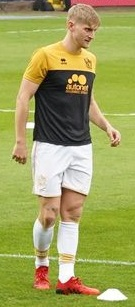
Nathan Smith played 45 of the club's 46 league games.

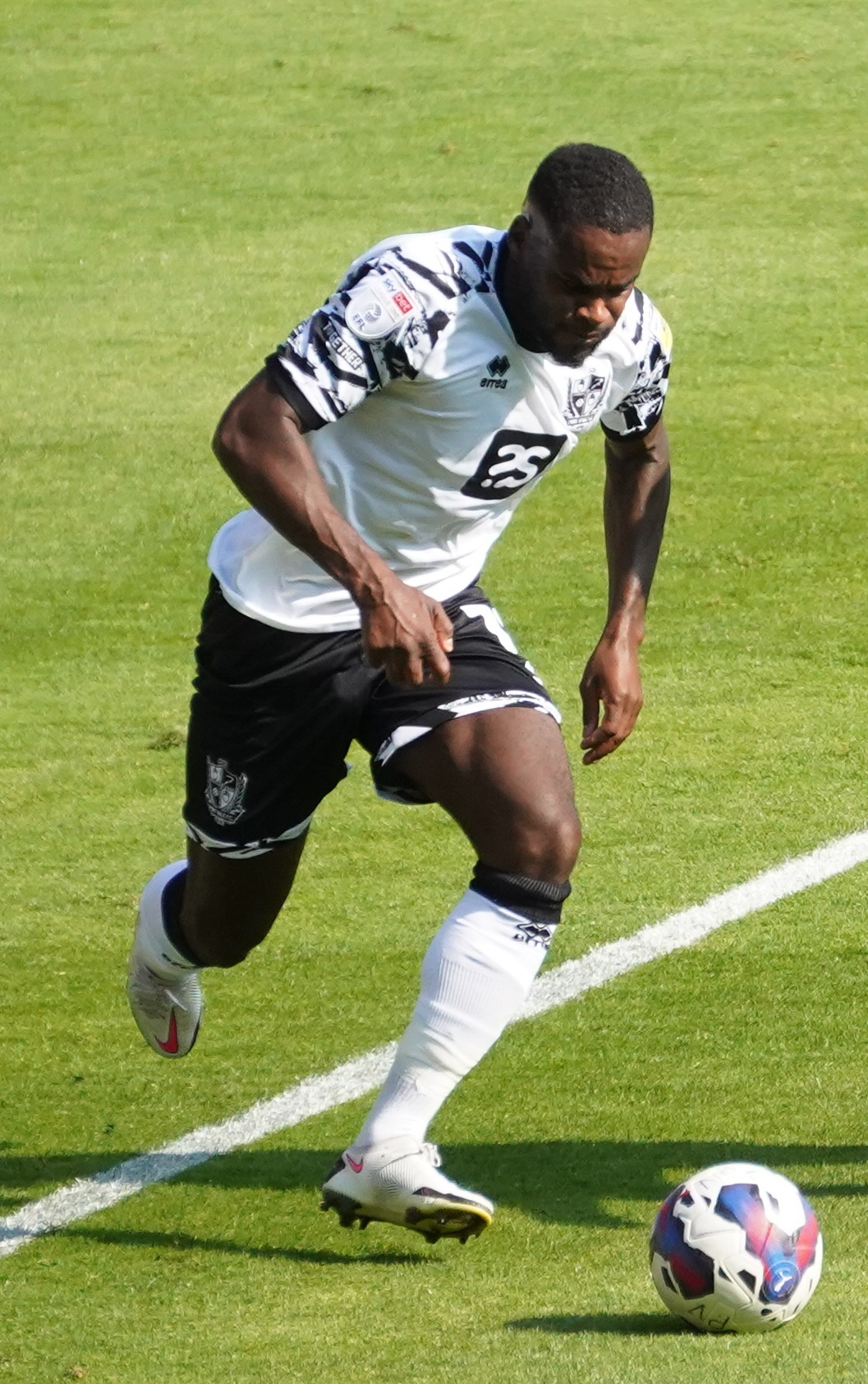
Gavin Massey played 47 games.

== Overview ==
=== EFL League One ===
Having achieved promotion out of EFL League Two via the play-offs, the Port Vale squad had a shorter summer break than most other EFL League One clubs as their final game was on 28 May rather than 30 April. As a result, the director of football David Flitcroft said that players would be having a phased return to training, with players who featured in more games taking longer to report back for the pre-season training camp in Spain. The first summer signing was Lewis Cass, who had played for the club on loan from Newcastle United in the 2021–22 season. Seeking experienced League One players, the club signed Belgian midfielder Funso Ojo following his release from Scottish Premiership club Aberdeen. Meanwhile Aaron Martin and Jake Taylor were sold on, to Eastleigh and Morecambe respectively. The club brought in number of signings in the last week of July: 20-year-old former Watford defender Derek Agyakwa (who had been at the club on trial), 21-year-old former Stoke City defender Will Forrester, 29-year-old former Wigan Athletic attacker Gavin Massey, and 17-year-old Southampton loanee defender Thierry Small. Rory Holden, a 24-year-old midfielder who had played under Clarke at Walsall, was also signed after spending pre-season with the club. Vale opened the season at Vale Park with a 2–1 win over Fleetwood Town; centre-backs Nathan Smith and Connor Hall scored within two minutes of each other complete a comeback victory after Daniel Batty opened the scoring on six minutes.

Having won on the opening day, Vale then fell to a heavy 4–0 defeat at fellow newly promoted side Exeter City, with Jamie Proctor having to make do with 17-year-old attacking midfielder Tommy McDermott as a strike partner amid a shortage of specialist forwards on the books. One specialist forward was signed on 11 August, Welshman Ellis Harrison arrived for an undisclosed fee from Fleetwood Town, having previously won two promotions under Clarke at Bristol Rovers. Goalkeeper Jack Stevens also arrived on a season-long loan from Oxford United. Both signings made their debuts in an entertaining 0–0 home draw with Bolton Wanderers, in which the away side were reduced to ten men after Ricardo Santos was sent off on 37 minutes. Bolton loanee goalkeeper James Trafford later said that he made the best save of his career in this match. Vale went on to lose 2–1 away at Milton Keynes Dons, where a brace from Bradley Johnson gave the hosts their first points of the campaign, and after the match Clarke defended his decision to rotate the squad to rest players. Vale went on to pick up their first away win of the campaign at struggling Burton Albion, winning 2–0 after Ben Garrity and Ellis Harrison scored second-half goals. However, they ended August with a 1–0 home defeat to Portsmouth. As the transfer window drew to a close, the club signed 19-year-old Irish striker Mipo Odubeko on a season-long loan from West Ham United. The club made three further loan signings on transfer deadline day: 22-year-old Blackburn Rovers striker Danny Butterworth, 22-year-old Cremonese winger Dennis Politic, and 21-year-old winger Stoke City winger Liam McCarron; Politic had impressed on loan at the club the previous summer, whilst McCarron became the first Stoke player to be loaned directly to Vale since March 1978 in what was heralded as a "new era" between the two Potteries derby rivals. Chris Hussey also had his contract terminated and signed with Stockport County.

On 3 September, Vale conceded a stoppage-time equaliser at home to Cheltenham Town after having come from behind to lead 2–1 at half-time. Ten days later, Vale came from behind thanks to a late Harrison header to draw 1–1 at Barnsley; Stevens received praise for his performance after making several good saves. Two goals from Harrison earned the Vale a 2–1 victory at home to Shrewsbury Town, taking his tally to five goals in seven games. However, Vale then slipped to a 3–0 defeat at Peterborough United, where Jonson Clarke-Harris scored a brace.

A crowd of 11,336 turned out to witness a 1–0 home defeat to Sheffield Wednesday on 1 October, with Will Vaulks's "thunderbolt from distance" separating the two teams. Seven days later, a crowd of 28,706 came to Pride Park Stadium to witness the Vale come from behind to beat Derby County 2–1 despite Tom Conlon missing a penalty; the referee awarded Vale another penalty in the second half, which Ellis Harrison converted, and after Derby goalscorer James Collins was sent off for an elbow on Smith, James Wilson scored his first goal of the campaign to win the game on 66 minutes. The attendance for this game was the biggest league crowd to witness a Vale match since 1998 and the largest to witness a Vale victory since 1955. The penalties were the first Port Vale were awarded in 73 competitive games, the longest known streak at the time. Ellis Harrison converted another penalty the next game as Vale came from two goals down to draw 2–2 at home to Forest Green Rovers. They went on to pick up three points away at Cambridge United courtesy of an own goal eleven minutes from full-time. Vale lost 3–2 at home to Ipswich Town despite coming from two goals down to level the scorelines with goals either side of the half-time whistle. Vale beat Lincoln City 1–0, with Danny Butterworth scoring his first goal for the club, and after the match assistant manager Andy Crosby praised the squad and said that: "following six games in the month, to pick up ten points against the calibre of opponents we have played has made it a really good month".

Vale opened November with a 2–2 draw at Wycombe Wanderers, having twice come from a goal down to secure a point with goals from James Wilson and Tom Conlon. Billy Bodin and Matty Taylor – who had both played for Darrell Clarke at Bristol Rovers – scored braces to condemn Vale to a 4–0 defeat at Oxford United. Clarke said that the match showed that the club still had to go "a long way to be an established League One team". Playing on the day before the 2022 FIFA World Cup started, Vale recorded a 1–0 home win over Charlton Athletic, with Danny Butterworth scoring the only goal of the game with what the club website described as "a beautiful second half solo goal". However, Charlton manager Ben Garner labelled Vale as "anti football" and a team with "no ambition for them to go and really attack and take the game to you".

More than 400 Vale fans travelled down to witness a 2–0 victory against league leaders Plymouth Argyle on the Friday night of 2 December, with James Wilson being credited for both goals on the club website despite Tom Conlon initially being credited by news outlets for the opening goal of the game. Vale's three-match winning run came to an end with a 1–0 defeat at Bristol Rovers, where Aaron Collins won the match on 87 minutes. They beat Morecambe 1–0 at home in the boxing day fixture, with Gavin Massey scoring the only goal of the game with a "fantastic long-range strike" on 41 minutes. The year ended with a 2–0 defeat at Sheffield Wednesday, with Michael Smith scoring a first-half penalty and a curved strike from outside the box in the second half; the away support of 3,139 was the Vale's largest league away following since February 2002.

The new year began with a 3–1 comeback victory at Forest Green Rovers, as late goals from Mipo Odubeko, Ellis Harrison, and Dennis Politic secured three points after Vale spent 84 minutes of the match a goal down. The first piece of January transfer window business was a departure, as Connor Hall was sold to Colchester United as he required a club closer to his Cambridgeshire home. Also leaving was central midfielder Brad Walker, who was sold to Tranmere Rovers for an undisclosed fee. Sky Sports moved the home with game with Peterborough United to a freezing cold Monday night on 16 January, where a second-half brace from Ephron Mason-Clark secured an away victory for newly appointed opposition manager Darren Ferguson. The following day, Harry Charsley's departure to League Two side Newport County was confirmed; similarly to Walker, he had struggled for gametime in central midfield. The first arrival of the window was 19-year-old left-back Aaron Donnelly, who joined on loan from Nottingham Forest on 23 January. He was an unused substitute as the Vale were beaten 2–1 at home by Derby County the following day, where a goal from Ojo early in the second-half goal seemed to have won all three points for the Valiants, only for Derby to turn the game around with two goals in the space of two minutes starting with David McGoldrick's strike with just three minutes left of the ninety to play. Donnelly instead made his debut in a goalless draw at Cheltenham Town. On transfer deadline day, Tommy McDermott and James Plant were loaned out to Salisbury, whilst prolific 32-year-old striker Matty Taylor joined on loan from Oxford United. Clarke later admitted the club "regressed" in the transfer window.

A poor performance meant that the Vale opened February with a 3–0 home defeat to Wycombe Wanderers. A frustrating 1–1 draw with Accrington Stanley followed, David Worrall's 57th-minute strike cancelling out Accrington's penalty after Ojo was penalised for a foul on Aaron Pressley, who converted the spot-kick; however, late in the game Butterworth missed a penalty which had been awarded to the Vale after Harvey Rodgers was sent off for using his hand to divert a header from Garrity off the goal line. A 3–2 defeat at Shrewsbury Town followed, which Clarke shouldered the blame for after admitting to picking the wrong starting eleven which left the side vulnerable to set-pieces. A 3–1 home defeat by Barnsley followed, with the visitors taking the lead within 60 seconds of the kick-off. A seven-game run without a win came to an end with a 1–0 home victory over Exeter City, with Forrester scoring the only goal of the game one minute after the visitors were reduced to ten men. This was followed by a 1–0 defeat at Morecambe in a game where Vale were much the better side. They played well at Bolton Wanderers, scoring first through Harrison, but lost the game 2–1 after the home side scored twice within nine first-half minutes.

Donnelly scored his first career goal to secure a 1–0 home victory over Milton Keynes Dons. Vale then picked up a point on the road with a 1–1 draw at Fleetwood Town with Taylor opening his account for the club, before Jack Marriott equalised on 84 minutes. On 18 March, Harrison opened the scoring at home to Burton in the opening two minutes, but a collapse in team performance saw the struggling away side come back to win 3–2. They held a two goals lead at Portsmouth on 25 March, with Stone saving a penalty, though another penalty was given away in the second half as Vale ultimately surrendered their lead and finished with a 2–2 draw.

April began with a poor defeat at home to Cambridge United after Sam Smith and Lloyd Jones scored for the visitors just after half-time. Speaking after the match, Clarke said "I am angry, frustrated and disappointed". He reminded his players that many were playing for their futures at the club for the remainder of the campaign. This was followed by a 3–0 defeat at another relegation-threatened club in Accrington Stanley on Good Friday, where Stevens dropped the ball into his own net and Ojo was sent off in stoppage-time for violent conduct – the first red card of Vale's season. A 0–0 home draw with relegation-threatened Oxford United ended the losing streak, though Politic was sent off in the closing stages for violent conduct. Two further red cards came Vale's way in a 3–2 defeat at Lincoln City, Conlon being the first one following a chaotic seven minute period around the half an hour mark where Vale came from a goal down to lead 2–1 against ten-men after Lincoln goalkeeper Carl Rushworth was sent off in the process of giving away a penalty, however, Lincoln won the match on 87 minutes after substitute Sammy Robinson was sent off for the visitors for a second bookable offence; Conlon's red card was rescinded on appeal. Clarke was sacked on 17 April and assistant manager Andy Crosby was installed as interim manager until the end of the season. Crosby's first game in charge was a spirited 2–1 defeat at promotion-chasing Ipswich Town, with Nathan Broadhead's second half brace cancelling out Benning's opener. A 2–0 home win over Bristol Rovers all but secured safety from relegation, with Ellis Harrison and Tom Pett scoring midway through the first half – Harrison's overhead kick was later voted as the club's goal of the season. Safety was confirmed despite a 3–2 defeat at Charlton Athletic as other results went in Vale's favour; Plant scored his first goal in the EFL, whilst Taylor grabbed a consolation goal deep into injury time.

In May, Funso Ojo admitted that many of the squad lost focus after losing Connor Hall in the January transfer window and sensing nothing to play for, leading to momentum turning against the club and a run of poor results. Plymouth Argyle secured the League One title with a 3–1 win at Vale Park on the final day of the season. Nathan Smith was named as the club's Player of the Year. The club released six players at the end of the season: Agyakwa, Lucas Covolan, Holden, Pett, Proctor and Robinson. Crosby was given the management job on a permanent basis. Wilson was the first of the out of contract players that were offered a contract to confirm his departure from the club. Worrall confirmed that he would be leaving to join Barrow on a two-year deal.

=== Finances ===
Port Vale received around £500,000 more from central payments from the Premier League and English Football League (EFL) as a League One club than they received in League Two. However, £1.2 million was spent on improving Vale Park and making it a Championship standard ground. The club sold over 21,000 replica kits, with designer Patrick Shanahan going for a traditional look to the home kit and basing the away kit on the 1991–92 Kalamazoo kit. In January, the club stated that crowds of 10,000 would be needed to support the management in building a promotion winning team as the ownership decided to show "restraint" in the transfer window. Chief executive and club secretary, Colin Garlick, left the club in April 2023 after six-and-a-half-years at the club. Club chair Carol Shanahan announced a shake-up of the club's management behind the scenes, stating that "anything that touches the ball is Dave Flitcroft. So, the first team, the academy and also the pitch, the groundstaff will work for Dave". Plans were also announced for a new scoreboard and vital improvements to the Vale Park pitch drainage system. Speaking after the club accounts were published in April, football finance commentator Kieran Maguire said that the club was losing roughly £1million a year and owed the Shanahan family more than £5.5million, and that such a situation was fairly standard in modern football. When the club's accounts were published they showed a loss of £3.4 million over the season.

=== Cup competitions ===
Port Vale had a home tie with Exeter City (League One) in the first round of the FA Cup and Clarke was disappointed to lose the game 3–2, saying that "the second half was nowhere near the standards we set".

Vale were drawn at home to Rotherham United (Championship) in the first round of the EFL Cup and suffered a 2–1 defeat, having trailed by two goals at half-time. This was the 40th time Vale had been knocked out of the competition at the first round, more than any other club.

In the EFL Trophy they were drawn into a group with Shrewsbury Town (League One), Stockport County (League Two), and Wolverhampton Wanderers U21. They beat Stockport 1–0 in front of 1,980 spectators at Vale Park in a game that saw a senior debut for James Plant, a first club appearance for Mipo Odubeko and first club goal for Chris Hussey. Having beaten Shrewsbury Town at home in the league three days earlier, Vale picked up a 4–0 victory at the New Meadow, with Dennis Politic claiming a hat-trick and Jack Shorrock becoming the youngest player in the club's history at 15 years and 145 days old. First place in the group was confirmed with a 2–0 win over Wolverhampton Wanderers U21, where Derek Agyakwa and Rhys Walters made their first-team debuts. They advanced into the Round of 16 with a 2–1 home win over Barnsley (League One) thanks to first-half goals from Dennis Politic and David Worrall. However, a disappointing 1–0 defeat at Salford City (League Two) concluded Vale's cup campaigns.

== Results ==
=== Pre-season ===
7 July 2022 Friendly	Kidsgrove Athletic	3–0	Port Vale	Kidsgrove
19:30 BST	49'; 54'; 73'	Report		Stadium: Hollinwood Road

13 July 2022 Friendly	Port Vale	1–0	Dundee United (Scotland)	Spain
14:00 BST	McDermott 48'	Report

23 July 2022 Friendly	Rochdale	2–3	Port Vale	Spotland
15:00 BST	Keohane 11'; Henderson 16'	Report	Proctor 18' (pen.), 53'; Ojo 57'	Stadium: Spotland Stadium

=== EFL League One ===
==== League table ====
Pos	Team	Pld	W	D	L	GF	GA	GD	Pts	Promotion, qualification or relegation
15	Burton Albion	46	15	11	20	57	79	−22	56	
16	Cheltenham Town	46	14	12	20	45	61	−16	54	
17	Bristol Rovers	46	14	11	21	58	73	−15	53	
18	Port Vale	46	13	10	23	48	71	−23	49	
19	Oxford United	46	11	14	21	49	56	−7	47	
20	Cambridge United	46	13	7	26	41	68	−27	46	
21	Milton Keynes Dons (R)	46	11	12	23	44	66	−22	45	Relegation to EFL League Two

Source: EFL Official Website
Rules for classification: 1) Points; 2) Goal difference; 3) Number of goals scored; 4) Head-to-head results; 5) Wins; 6) Away goals; 7) Penalty points (sec 9.5); 8) 12-point sending off offences
(R) Relegated

==== Results by matchday ====
Matchday	1	2	3	4	5	6	7	8	9	10	11	12	13	14	15	16	17	18	19	20	21	22	23	24	25	26	27	28	29	30	31	32	33	34	35	36	37	38	39	40	41	42	43	44	45	46
Ground	H	A	H	A	A	H	H	A	H	A	H	A	H	A	H	H	A	A	H	A	A	H	A	A	H	H	A	H	H	A	H	H	A	A	H	A	H	A	H	A	H	A	A	H	A	H
Result	W	L	D	L	W	L	D	D	W	L	L	W	D	W	L	W	D	L	W	W	L	W	L	W	L	L	D	L	D	L	L	W	L	L	W	D	L	D	L	L	D	L	L	W	L	L
Position	4	17	16	18	10	19	17	17	13	15	16	14	16	14	14	12	10	15	10	9	12	9	9	9	11	14	13	14	14	15	15	12	12	16	13	14	16	16	17	17	17	18	18	17	18	18
Points	3	3	4	4	7	7	8	9	12	12	12	15	16	19	19	22	23	23	26	29	29	32	32	35	35	35	36	36	37	37	37	40	40	40	43	44	44	45	45	45	46	46	46	49	49	49

Updated to match(es) played on 7 May 2023. Source: Statto.com
A = Away; H = Home; W = Win; D = Draw; L = Loss

==== Matches ====
Win Draw Loss

30 July 2022 1	Port Vale	2–1	Fleetwood Town	Burslem
15:00 BST	Smith 30'; Hall 32'	Report	Batty 6'	Stadium: Vale Park; Attendance: 8,109; Referee: Peter Wright; Assistant referees: Christopher Husband, Abbas Khan; Fourth official: Aaron Bannister

6 August 2022 2	Exeter City	4–0	Port Vale	Exeter
15:00 BST	Kite 24'; Brown 38' (pen.), 72'; Nombe 75'	Report		Stadium: St James Park; Attendance: 6,701; Referee: Charles Breakspear; Assistant referees: Daniel Flynn, Jack Clench; Fourth official: Christopher Wade

13 August 2022 3	Port Vale	0–0	Bolton Wanderers	Burslem
15:00 BST		Report		Stadium: Vale Park; Attendance: 10,277; Referee: Ross Joyce; Assistant referees: Nicholas Barnard, Leigh Crowhurst; Fourth official: Hristo Karaivanov

16 August 2022 4	Milton Keynes Dons	2–1	Port Vale	Milton Keynes
19:45 BST	Johnson 34', 85'	Report	Harrison 90+3'	Stadium: Stadium:mk; Attendance: 7,041; Referee: Tom Nield; Assistant referees: Dean Treleaven, Daniel Cook; Fourth official: Alan Young

20 August 2022 5	Burton Albion	0–2	Port Vale	Burton upon Trent
15:00 BST		Report	Garrity 49'; Harrison 90+1'	Stadium: Pirelli Stadium; Attendance: 3,744; Referee: Andy Haines; Assistant referees: Wayne Grunnill, Christopher Ward; Fourth official: Edward Duckworth

27 August 2022 6	Port Vale	0–1	Portsmouth	Burslem
15:00 BST		Report	Scarlett 25'	Stadium: Vale Park; Attendance: 8,878; Referee: Craig Hicks; Assistant referees: Helen Byrne, Marvyn Amphlett; Fourth official: Dean Whitestone

3 September 2022 7	Port Vale	2–2	Cheltenham Town	Burslem
15:00 BST	Odubeko 37'; Forrester 40'	Report	Nlundulu 24'; Brown 90+2'	Stadium: Vale Park; Attendance: 6,949; Referee: Rebecca Welch; Assistant referees: Grant Taylor, Johnathon Bickerdike, Ollie Williams; Fourth official: Carl Boyeson

13 September 2022 8	Barnsley	1–1	Port Vale	Barnsley
19:45 BST	Kitching 43'	Report	Harrison 83'	Stadium: Oakwell; Attendance: 9,552; Referee: Thomas Parsons; Assistant referees: Stephen Wade, Joe Simpson; Fourth official: Garreth Rhodes

17 September 2022 9	Port Vale	2–1	Shrewsbury Town	Burslem
15:00 BST	Harrison 9', 90+1'	Report	Saydee 19'	Stadium: Vale Park; Attendance: 7,403; Referee: Ben Speedie; Assistant referees: Lee Freeman, Nicholas Barnard; Fourth official: Richard Wigglesworth

24 September 2022 10	Peterborough United	3–0	Port Vale	Peterborough
15:00 BST	Clarke-Harris 26', 36'; Ward 73'	Report		Stadium: London Road Stadium; Attendance: 7,235; Referee: Anthony Backhouse; Assistant referees: Stephen Finch, Garry Maskell; Fourth official: Ryan Whitaker

1 October 2022 11	Port Vale	0–1	Sheffield Wednesday	Burslem
15:00 BST		Report	Vaulks 63'	Stadium: Vale Park; Attendance: 11,336; Referee: Christopher Pollard; Assistant referees: Johnathon Bickerdike, Lisa Rashid; Fourth official: Martin Coy

8 October 2022 12	Derby County	1–2	Port Vale	Derby
15:00 BST	Collins 5'	Report	Harrison 55' (pen.); Wilson 66'	Stadium: Pride Park Stadium; Attendance: 28,706; Referee: Sam Allison; Assistant referees: Dean Treleaven, Matthew Parry; Fourth official: Thomas Harty

15 October 2022 13	Port Vale	2–2	Forest Green Rovers	Burslem
15:00 BST	Odubeko 78'; Harrison 88' (pen.)	Report	Peart-Harris 14'; Cargill 37'	Stadium: Vale Park; Attendance: 7,092; Referee: Martin Woods; Assistant referees: Stephen Wade, Kevin Howick; Fourth official: Declan Ford

22 October 2022 14	Cambridge United	0–1	Port Vale	Cambridge
15:00 BST		Report	Digby 79' (og.)	Stadium: Abbey Stadium; Attendance: 6,218; Referee: Thomas Kirk; Assistant referees: Conor Farrell, Scott Williams; Fourth official: Nicholas Cooper

25 October 2022 15	Port Vale	2–3	Ipswich Town	Burslem
19:45 BST	Massey 45+6'; Smith 47'	Report	Ladapo 34', 51'; Humphreys 38'	Stadium: Vale Park; Attendance: 7,928; Referee: Andrew Kitchen; Assistant referees: Grant Taylor, Jake Topp; Fourth official: David Richardson

29 October 2022 16	Port Vale	1–0	Lincoln City	Burslem
15:00 BST	Butterworth 68'	Report		Stadium: Vale Park; Attendance: 7,294; Referee: Sunny Singh Gill; Assistant referees: Marvyn Amphlett, Darren Wilding; Fourth official: Christopher Husband

1 November 2022 17	Wycombe Wanderers	2–2	Port Vale	High Wycombe
15:00 BST	Mehmeti 4'; Wing 61'	Report	Wilson 45+7'; Conlon 77'	Stadium: Adams Park; Attendance: 4,192; Referee: Robert Lewis; Assistant referees: Stephen Finch, Andrew Bennett; Fourth official: Steven Plane
Note: Fixture was originally scheduled for 10 September 2022, but postponed as a mark of respect following the passing of Queen Elizabeth II.

12 November 2022 18	Oxford United	4–0	Port Vale	Oxford
15:00 GMT	Bodin 10', 62'; Taylor 27', 66'	Report		Stadium: Kassam Stadium; Attendance: 8,198; Referee: David Rock; Assistant referees: Joe Simpson, Steve Durnall; Fourth official: Kevin Morris

19 November 2022 19	Port Vale	1–0	Charlton Athletic	Burslem
15:00 GMT	Butterworth 57'	Report		Stadium: Vale Park; Attendance: 7,604; Referee: Sam Barrott; Assistant referees: Helen Byrne, Abbas Khan, Wayne Grunnill; Fourth official: Kevin Mulraine

2 December 2022 20	Plymouth Argyle	0–2	Port Vale	Plymouth
19:45 GMT		Report	Wilson 65', 71'	Stadium: Home Park; Attendance: 15,633; Referee: John Busby; Assistant referees: Mark Pottage, Andrew Aylott; Fourth official: Craig Hicks

10 December 2022 21	Bristol Rovers	1–0	Port Vale	Bristol
15:00 GMT	Collins 87'	Report		Stadium: Memorial Stadium; Attendance: 8,264; Referee: Carl Brook; Assistant referees: Marvyn Amphlett, Dean Treleaven; Fourth official: Andy Hendley

26 December 2022 22	Port Vale	1–0	Morecambe	Burslem
15:00 GMT	Massey 40'	Report		Stadium: Vale Park; Attendance: 7,867; Referee: Simon Mather; Assistant referees: Nicholas Barnard, Bradley Hall; Fourth official: Danny Gratton

29 December 2022 23	Sheffield Wednesday	2–0	Port Vale	Sheffield
19:45 GMT	Smith 30', 70' (pen.)	Report		Stadium: Hillsborough Stadium; Attendance: 26,021; Referee: Darren Drysdale; Assistant referees: Alex Gray, Stephen Wade; Fourth official: Neil Hair

1 January 2023 24	Forest Green Rovers	1–3	Port Vale	Nailsworth
15:00 GMT	McAllister 2'	Report	Odubeko 86'; Harrison 90+8' (pen.); Politic 90+12'	Stadium: The New Lawn; Attendance: 3,041; Referee: Lee Swabey; Assistant referees: Paul Evans, Stephen Brown; Fourth official: Andrew Bennett

16 January 2023 25	Port Vale	0–2	Peterborough United	Burslem
20:00 GMT		Report	Mason-Clark 56', 64'	Stadium: Vale Park; Attendance: 5,109; Referee: Peter Wright; Assistant referees: Joe Simpson, Mark Cunliffe; Fourth official: Thomas Kirk

24 January 2023 26	Port Vale	1–2	Derby County	Burslem
19:45 GMT	Ojo 56'	Report	McGoldrick 87'; Mendez-Laing 89'	Stadium: Vale Park; Attendance: 10,307; Referee: Ben Toner; Assistant referees: Ollie Williams, Johnathon Bickerdike; Fourth official: Christopher Ward

28 January 2023 27	Cheltenham Town	0–0	Port Vale	Cheltenham
15:00 GMT		Report		Stadium: Whaddon Road; Attendance: 3,929; Referee: Martin Coy; Assistant referees: Jack Clench, Simon Shaw; Fourth official: Adam Ricketts

4 February 2023 28	Port Vale	0–3	Wycombe Wanderers	Burslem
15:00 GMT		Report	Hanlan 13'; Jacobson 79' (pen.); McCleary 82'	Stadium: Vale Park; Attendance: 7,237; Referee: Marc Edwards; Assistant referees: Richard Wigglesworth, Darren Wilding; Fourth official: Simon Mather

7 February 2023 29	Port Vale	1–1	Accrington Stanley	Burslem
19:45 GMT	Worrall 57'	Report	Pressley 52' (pen.)	Stadium: Vale Park; Attendance: 4,729; Referee: Ben Speedie; Assistant referees: Nicholas Barnard, Grant Taylor, Richard Woodward; Fourth official: Ben Speedie
Note: Fixture was originally scheduled for 13 December 2022, but was postponed due to a frozen pitch at Vale Park.

11 February 2023 30	Shrewsbury Town	3–2	Port Vale	Shrewsbury
15:00 GMT	Dunkley 27'; Leahy 33'; Phillips 43'	Report	Politic 13'; Proctor 52'	Stadium: New Meadow; Attendance: 8,502; Referee: Thomas Parsons; Assistant referees: Hristo Karaivanov, Blake Antrobus, Danny Gratton; Fourth official: Steven Plane

14 February 2023 31	Port Vale	1–3	Barnsley	Burslem
19:45 GMT	Smith 14'	Report	Connell 1'; Kitching 21'; Phillips 61'	Stadium: Vale Park; Attendance: 5,663; Referee: Sam Barrott; Assistant referees: Michael George, Alex Gray; Fourth official: Darren Handley

18 February 2023 32	Port Vale	1–0	Exeter City	Burslem
15:00 GMT	Forrester 60'	Report		Stadium: Vale Park; Attendance: 6,209; Referee: Andrew Kitchen; Assistant referees: Gary Hilton, Damith Bandara; Fourth official: Alan Clayton

21 February 2023 33	Morecambe	1–0	Port Vale	Morecambe
19:45 GMT	Mayor 51'	Report		Stadium: Globe Arena; Attendance: 4,360; Referee: Ross Joyce; Assistant referees: Joe Simpson, Matthew Parry; Fourth official: Martin Woods
Note: Fixture was originally scheduled for 21 January 2023, but was postponed due to a frozen pitch at the Globe Arena.

25 February 2023 34	Bolton Wanderers	2–1	Port Vale	Horwich
15:00 GMT	Adeboyejo 18'; Sheehan 27'	Report	Harrison 8'	Stadium: University of Bolton Stadium; Attendance: 19,857; Referee: Will Finnie; Assistant referees: Lisa Rashid, Daniel Woodward; Fourth official: Peter Gooch

4 March 2023 35	Port Vale	1–0	Milton Keynes Dons	Burslem
15:00 GMT	Donnelly 22'	Report		Stadium: Vale Park; Attendance: 6,696; Referee: Darren Handley; Assistant referees: Kevin Morris, Ollie Williams; Fourth official: Declan Ford

11 March 2023 36	Fleetwood Town	1–1	Port Vale	Fleetwood
15:00 GMT	Marriott 83'	Report	Taylor 57'	Stadium: Highbury Stadium; Attendance: 4,187; Referee: Paul Howard; Assistant referees: Jake Topp, Nicholas Barnard; Fourth official: Andy Haines

18 March 2023 37	Port Vale	2–3	Burton Albion	Burslem
15:00 GMT	Harrison 2'; Proctor 80'	Report	Taylor 8', 67'; Smith 48' (pen.)	Stadium: Vale Park; Attendance: 6,897; Referee: Sam Allison; Assistant referees: Michael Webb, Abbas Khan; Fourth official: Christopher Ward

25 March 2023 38	Portsmouth	2–2	Port Vale	Portsmouth
15:00 GMT	Bishop 67' (pen.); Jacobs 70'	Report	Taylor 8'; Ojo 39'	Stadium: Fratton Park; Attendance: 18,046; Referee: Neil Hair; Assistant referees: Leigh Crowhurst, Paul Kelly; Fourth official: Andrew Bennett

1 April 2023 39	Port Vale	0–2	Cambridge United	Burslem
15:00 BST		Report	Smith 48'; Jones 52'	Stadium: Vale Park; Attendance: 6,730; Referee: Tom Reeves; Assistant referees: Jacob Lehane, Adam Ricketts; Fourth official: Darren Wilding

7 April 2023 40	Accrington Stanley	3–0	Port Vale	Accrington
15:00 BST	Stevens 31' (og.); Rodgers 40'; Pressley 68' (pen.)	Report		Stadium: Crown Ground; Attendance: 3,444; Referee: Andy Woolmer; Assistant referees: Andrew Aylott, Adam Crysell; Fourth official: Paul Howard

10 April 2023 41	Port Vale	0–0	Oxford United	Burslem
15:00 BST		Report		Stadium: Vale Park; Attendance: 6,672; Referee: Martin Woods; Assistant referees: Steve Durnall, William Smallwood; Fourth official: Mark Cunliffe

15 April 2023 42	Lincoln City	3–2	Port Vale	Lincoln
15:00 BST	Sørensen 11'; House 42'; Jackson 87'	Report	Taylor 30' (pen.); Butterworth 33'	Stadium: Sincil Bank; Attendance: 8,290; Referee: David Rock; Assistant referees: Stephen Wade, Simon Clayton; Fourth official: Bradley Hall

18 April 2023 43	Ipswich Town	2–1	Port Vale	Ipswich
19:45 BST	Broadhead 53', 84' (pen.)	Report	Benning 45+2'	Stadium: Portman Road; Attendance: 27,696; Referee: Robert Lewis; Assistant referees: Anthony Da Costa, Paul Lister; Fourth official: Marc Wilson

22 April 2023 44	Port Vale	2–0	Bristol Rovers	Burslem
15:00 BST	Harrison 22'; Pett 29'	Report		Stadium: Vale Park; Attendance: 7,669; Referee: Sunny Singh Gill; Assistant referees: Nicholas Barnard, Conor Brown, Joe Simpson; Fourth official: Richard Wigglesworth

29 April 2023 45	Charlton Athletic	3–2	Port Vale	Charlton, London
15:00 BST	Campbell 14'; Rak-Sakyi 58'; Leaburn 77'	Report	Plant 62'; Taylor 90+7'	Stadium: The Valley; Attendance: 15,314; Referee: Carl Brook; Assistant referees: Michael George, Alex James, Kevin Morris; Fourth official: Simon Shaw

7 May 2023 46	Port Vale	1–3	Plymouth Argyle	Burslem
12:30 BST	Plant 3'	Report	Randell 34'; Edwards 38'; Azaz 61'	Stadium: Vale Park; Attendance: 11,998; Referee: Simon Mather; Assistant referees: Alex Gray, Mark Cunliffe; Fourth official: Alan Clayton

=== FA Cup ===
5 November 2022 R1	Port Vale	2–3	Exeter City	Burslem
15:00 GMT	Politic 25'; Butterworth 87'	Report	Brown 43', 66'; Collins 89'	Stadium: Vale Park; Attendance: 4,807; Referee: Simon Mather; Assistant referees: Andy Hendley, Mark Cunliffe; Fourth official: Matthew Scholes

=== EFL Cup ===
10 August 2022 R1	Port Vale	1–2	Rotherham United	Burslem
19:45 BST	Benning 81'	Report	Rathbone 8'; Ogbene 45+4'	Stadium: Vale Park; Attendance: 3,094; Referee: Bobby Madden; Assistant referees: William Smallwood, Blake Antrobus; Fourth official: Kevin Morris

=== EFL Trophy ===
Pos	Div	Team	Pld	W	PW	PL	L	GF	GA	GD	Pts	Qualification
1	L1	Port Vale	3	3	0	0	0	7	0	+7	9	Advance to Round 2
2	ACA	Wolverhampton Wanderers U21	3	2	0	0	1	4	4	0	6	Advance to Round 2
3	L2	Stockport County	3	1	0	0	2	2	3	−1	3	
4	L1	Shrewsbury Town	3	0	0	0	3	1	7	−6	0	

Source: EFL.com

30 August 2022 Group stage	Port Vale	1–0	Stockport County	Burslem
19:30 BST	Hussey 64'	Report		Stadium: Vale Park; Attendance: 1,980; Referee: Seb Stockbridge; Assistant referees: Jake Topp, Oliver Bickle; Fourth official: Matthew Corlett

20 September 2022 Group stage	Shrewsbury Town	0–4	Port Vale	Shrewsbury
19:00 BST		Report	Politic 15', 56', 57'; Walker 74'	Stadium: New Meadow; Attendance: 1,635; Referee: Ben Toner; Assistant referees: Thomas Harty, Christopher Husband; Fourth official: Benjamin Wyatt

18 October 2022 Group stage	Port Vale	2–0	Wolverhampton Wanderers U21	Burslem
19:30 BST	Benning 80'; Odubeko 87'	Report		Stadium: Vale Park; Attendance: 1,090; Referee: Scott Oldham; Assistant referees: Richard Woodward, Paul Evans, Peter Gooch, Matthew Parry; Fourth official: William Davis

22 November 2022 Round of 32	Port Vale	2–1	Barnsley	Burslem
19:00 GMT	Politic 14'; Worrall 27'	Report	Edwards 73'	Stadium: Vale Park; Attendance: 1,306; Referee: Lewis Smith; Assistant referees: Gary Hilton, Thomas Harty; Fourth official: Peter Wright

20 December 2022 Round of 16	Salford City	1–0	Port Vale	Salford
19:30 GMT	Smith 10'	Report		Stadium: Moor Lane; Attendance: 743; Referee: Anthony Backhouse; Assistant referees: Johnathon Bickerdike, Grant Taylor, Mark Derrien; Fourth official: Ben Toner
Note: Fixture was originally scheduled for 13 December 2022, but was postponed due to a part-frozen pitch at Moor Lane.

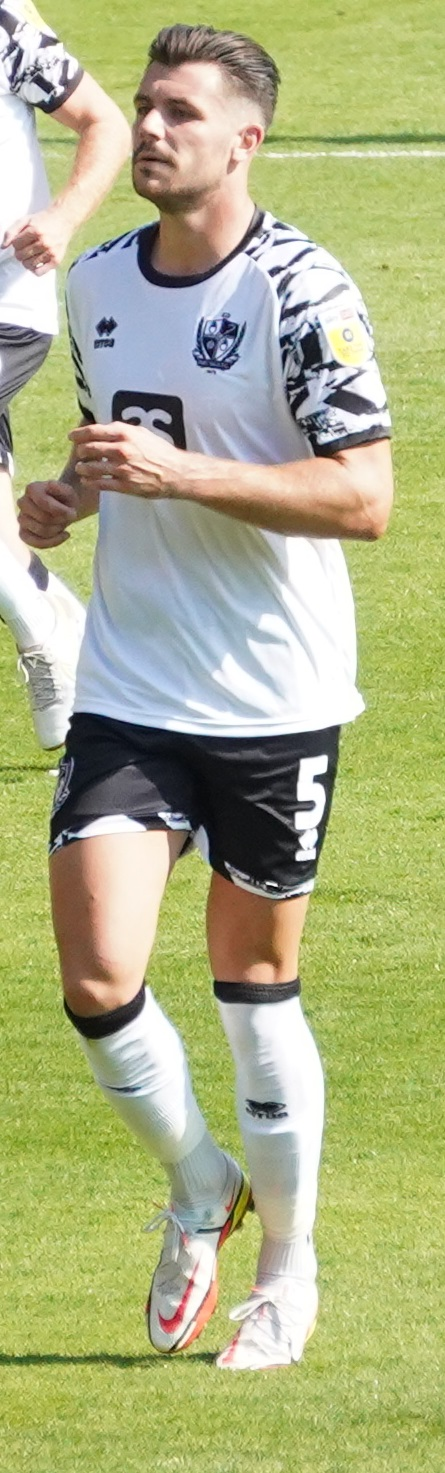
The team's form suffered greatly after Connor Hall departed in January.

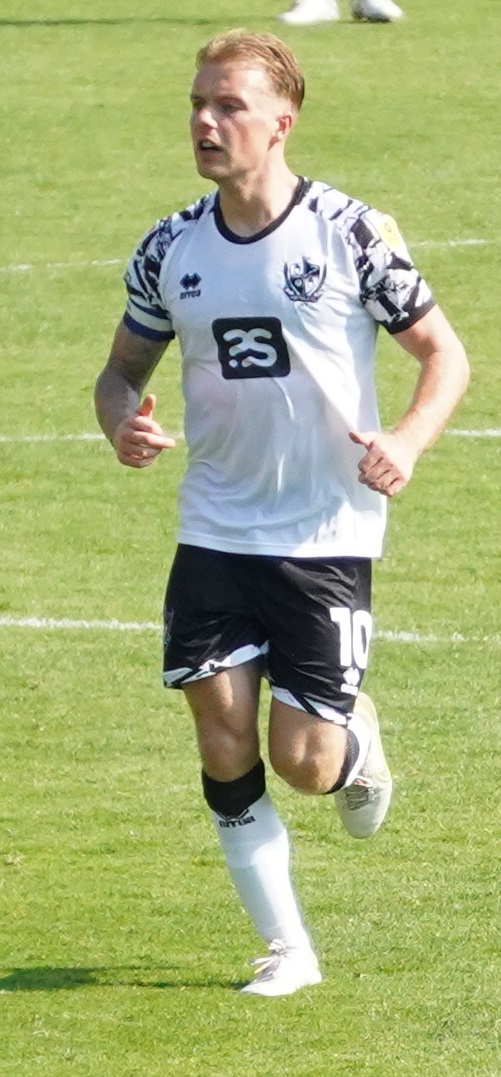
Club captain Tom Conlon.

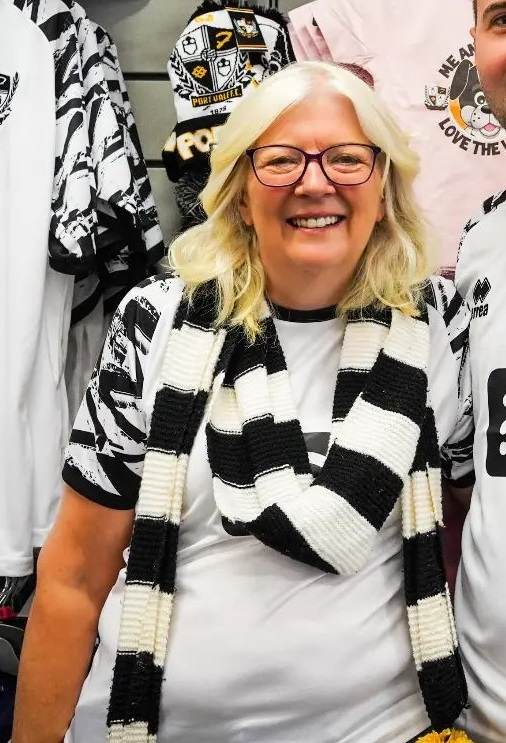
Club chairperson Carol Shanahan.

== Squad statistics ==
=== Appearances and goals ===
Key to positions: GK – Goalkeeper; DF – Defender; MF – Midfielder; FW – Forward

No.	Pos	Nat	Player	Total		EFL League One		FA Cup		EFL Cup		EFL Trophy	
No.	Pos	Nat	Player	Apps	Goals	Apps	Goals	Apps	Goals	Apps	Goals	Apps	Goals
1	GK	(England) ENG	Aidan Stone	26	0	20	0	1	0	1	0	4	0
2	DF	(England) ENG	Lewis Cass	24	0	19	0	1	0	0	0	4	0
3	DF	(England) ENG	Dan Jones	30	0	25	0	1	0	1	0	3	0
5	DF	(Northern Ireland) NIR	Aaron Donnelly	20	1	20	1	0	0	0	0	0	0
6	DF	(England) ENG	Nathan Smith	49	3	45	3	1	0	1	0	2	0
7	MF	(England) ENG	David Worrall	44	2	39	1	1	0	0	0	4	1
8	MF	(England) ENG	Ben Garrity	37	1	34	1	0	0	1	0	2	0
9	FW	(England) ENG	James Wilson	27	4	25	4	0	0	0	0	2	0
10	MF	(England) ENG	Tom Conlon	42	1	37	1	1	0	1	0	3	0
11	DF	(England) ENG	Mal Benning	44	3	39	1	1	0	1	1	3	1
13	FW	(England) ENG	Jamie Proctor	21	2	20	2	0	0	1	0	0	0
14	MF	(Belgium) BEL	Funso Ojo	29	2	28	2	0	0	1	0	0	0
15	DF	(England) ENG	Will Forrester	38	2	35	2	0	0	1	0	2	0
17	MF	(Northern Ireland) NIR	Rory Holden	16	0	11	0	1	0	1	0	3	0
19	FW	(England) ENG	Gavin Massey	47	2	41	2	1	0	1	0	4	0
20	FW	(England) ENG	Matty Taylor	14	4	14	4	0	0	0	0	0	0
21	FW	(Republic of Ireland) IRL	Mipo Odubeko	27	4	22	3	1	0	0	0	4	1
22	FW	(Wales) WAL	Ellis Harrison	34	11	33	11	0	0	0	0	1	0
23	MF	(England) ENG	Tom Pett	36	1	30	1	1	0	1	0	4	0
24	DF	(Netherlands) NED	Derek Agyakwa	2	0	1	0	0	0	0	0	1	0
25	GK	(England) ENG	Jack Stevens	28	0	27	0	0	0	0	0	1	0
26	FW	(England) ENG	Danny Butterworth	34	4	31	3	1	1	0	0	2	0
27	DF	(England) ENG	Sammy Robinson	27	0	22	0	1	0	1	0	3	0
28	MF	(England) ENG	Tommy McDermott	5	0	2	0	0	0	1	0	2	0
29	MF	(England) ENG	James Plant	9	2	6	2	0	0	0	0	3	0
30	MF	(Scotland) SCO	Liam McCarron	4	0	2	0	1	0	0	0	1	0
31	MF	(England) ENG	Jack Shorrock	2	0	1	0	0	0	0	0	1	0
32	MF	(England) ENG	Rhys Walters	1	0	0	0	0	0	0	0	1	0
33	MF	(Romania) ROU	Dennis Politic	29	7	24	2	1	1	0	0	4	4
34	MF	(Portugal) POR	Joao Silva Pevide	0	0	0	0	0	0	0	0	0	0
	GK	(Brazil) BRA	Lucas Covolan	0	0	0	0	0	0	0	0	0	0
Players who featured but departed the club during the season:
4	MF	(England) ENG	Brad Walker	10	1	7	0	0	0	1	0	2	1
5	DF	(England) ENG	Connor Hall	25	1	20	1	0	0	0	0	5	0
16	DF	(England) ENG	Chris Hussey	4	1	3	0	0	0	0	0	1	1
18	DF	(England) ENG	Thierry Small	8	0	4	0	0	0	1	0	3	0
20	MF	(Republic of Ireland) IRL	Harry Charsley	10	0	6	0	1	0	0	0	3	0

=== Top scorers ===
Place	Position	Nation	Number	Name	EFL League One	FA Cup	EFL Cup	EFL Trophy	Total
1	FW	Wales	22	Ellis Harrison	11	0	0	0	11
2	MF	Romania	33	Dennis Politic	2	1	0	4	7
3	FW	England	26	Danny Butterworth	3	1	0	0	4
–	FW	Ireland	21	Mipo Odubeko	3	0	0	1	4
–	FW	England	20	Matty Taylor	4	0	0	0	4
–	FW	England	9	James Wilson	4	0	0	0	4
7	DF	England	11	Mal Benning	1	0	1	1	3
–	DF	England	6	Nathan Smith	3	0	0	0	3
9	DF	England	15	Will Forrester	2	0	0	0	2
–	FW	England	19	Gavin Massey	2	0	0	0	2
–	MF	Belgium	14	Funso Ojo	2	0	0	0	2
–	MF	England	29	James Plant	2	0	0	0	2
–	FW	England	13	Jamie Proctor	2	0	0	0	2
–	MF	England	7	David Worrall	1	0	0	1	2
15	MF	England	10	Tom Conlon	1	0	0	0	1
–	DF	Northern Ireland	5	Aaron Donnelly	1	0	0	0	1
–	MF	England	8	Ben Garrity	1	0	0	0	1
–	DF	England	5	Connor Hall	1	0	0	0	1
–	DF	England	16	Chris Hussey	0	0	0	1	1
–	MF	England	23	Tom Pett	1	0	0	0	1
–	MF	England	4	Brad Walker	0	0	0	1	1
–	–	–	–	Own goals	1	0	0	0	1
				TOTALS	48	2	1	9	60

=== Disciplinary record ===
Number	Nation	Position	Name	EFL League One		FA Cup		EFL Cup		EFL Trophy		Total	
Number	Nation	Position	Name	Yellow card	Red card	Yellow card	Red card	Yellow card	Red card	Yellow card	Red card	Yellow card	Red card
27	England	DF	Sammy Robinson	8	1	0	0	0	0	2	0	10	1
33	Romania	MF	Dennis Politic	5	1	0	0	0	0	0	0	5	1
14	Belgium	MF	Funso Ojo	5	1	0	0	0	0	0	0	5	1
19	England	FW	Gavin Massey	8	0	0	0	0	0	0	0	8	0
11	England	DF	Mal Benning	7	0	0	0	0	0	0	0	7	0
22	Wales	FW	Ellis Harrison	7	0	0	0	0	0	0	0	7	0
8	England	MF	Ben Garrity	5	0	0	0	0	0	1	0	6	0
3	England	DF	Dan Jones	6	0	0	0	0	0	0	0	6	0
6	England	DF	Nathan Smith	5	0	0	0	1	0	0	0	6	0
23	England	MF	Tom Pett	5	0	0	0	0	0	1	0	6	0
10	England	MF	Tom Conlon	5	0	0	0	0	0	0	0	5	0 (Note: Tom Conlon's red card against Lincoln City on 15 April was rescinded on appeal.)
15	England	DF	Will Forrester	5	0	0	0	0	0	0	0	5	0
26	England	FW	Danny Butterworth	4	0	0	0	0	0	0	0	4	0
28	England	MF	Tommy McDermott	1	0	0	0	0	0	2	0	3	0
13	England	FW	Jamie Proctor	3	0	0	0	0	0	0	0	3	0
5	England	DF	Aaron Donnelly	2	0	0	0	0	0	0	0	2	0
20	England	FW	Matty Taylor	2	0	0	0	0	0	0	0	2	0
9	England	FW	James Wilson	2	0	0	0	0	0	0	0	2	0
7	England	MF	David Worrall	2	0	0	0	0	0	0	0	2	0
24	Netherlands	DF	Derek Agyakwa	1	0	0	0	0	0	0	0	1	0
5	England	DF	Connor Hall	1	0	0	0	0	0	0	0	1	0
21	Ireland	FW	Mipo Odubeko	1	0	0	0	0	0	0	0	1	0
29	England	MF	James Plant	1	0	0	0	0	0	0	0	1	0
25	England	GK	Jack Stevens	1	0	0	0	0	0	0	0	1	0
1	England	GK	Aidan Stone	1	0	0	0	0	0	0	0	1	0
			TOTALS	93	3	0	0	1	0	6	0	100	3

Sourced from Soccerway.

== Transfers ==
=== Transfers in ===
Date from	Position	Nationality	Name	From	Fee	Ref.
1 July 2022 (Note: The transfer was announced on 11 June and would become official on 1 Jul once his contract at Newcastle United expired)	CB	ENG	Lewis Cass	Newcastle United	Free transfer	
1 July 2022 (Note: The transfer was announced on 28 June and would become official on 1 July once his contract at Aberdeen expired)	CM	BEL	Funso Ojo	(Scotland) Aberdeen	Free transfer	
25 July 2022	RW	ENG	Gavin Massey	Wigan Athletic	Free transfer	
26 July 2022	CB	NED	Derek Agyakwa	Watford	Free transfer	
26 July 2022	CB	ENG	Will Forrester	Stoke City	Free transfer	
29 July 2022	CM	NIR	Rory Holden	Walsall	Free transfer	
11 August 2022	CF	WAL	Ellis Harrison	Fleetwood Town	Undisclosed	

=== Transfers out ===
Date from	Position	Nationality	Name	To	Fee	Ref.
8 July 2022	CB	ENG	Aaron Martin	Eastleigh	Undisclosed	
8 July 2022	CM	ENG	Jake Taylor	Morecambe	Undisclosed	
1 September 2022	LB	ENG	Chris Hussey	Stockport County	Contract terminated	
7 January 2023	CB	ENG	Connor Hall	Colchester United	Undisclosed	
11 January 2023	FW	SEY	Tyrone Cadeau	Matlock Town	Free transfer	
12 January 2023	DM	ENG	Brad Walker	Tranmere Rovers	Undisclosed	
17 January 2023	CM	IRL	Harry Charsley	Newport County	Mutual consent	
23 June 2023	GK	ENG	Aidan Stone	Notts County	Free Transfer	
30 June 2023	CB	NED	Derek Agyakwa	(Georgia (country)) Iberia 1999	Released	
30 June 2023	GK	BRA	Lucas Covolan	Maidstone United	Released	
30 June 2023	CM	NIR	Rory Holden	(Wales) The New Saints	Released	
30 June 2023	LM	ENG	Tom Pett	Cheltenham Town	Released	
30 June 2023	CF	ENG	Jamie Proctor	Barrow	Released	
30 June 2023	RB	ENG	Sammy Robinson	Kidderminster Harriers	Released	
30 June 2023	RM	ENG	David Worrall	Barrow	Rejected contract	

=== Loans in ===
Date from	Position	Nationality	Name	From	Date until	Ref.
26 July 2022	LB	ENG	Thierry Small	Southampton	11 November 2022 (Note: On 11 November, Small was recalled back early by his parent club Southampton.)	
11 August 2022	GK	ENG	Jack Stevens	Oxford United	End of season	
26 August 2022	CF	IRL	Mipo Odubeko	West Ham United	End of season	
1 September 2022	CF	ENG	Danny Butterworth	Blackburn Rovers	End of season	
1 September 2022	LW	ROM	Dennis Politic	(Italy) Cremonese	End of season	
1 September 2022	LW	SCO	Liam McCarron	Stoke City	End of season	
23 January 2023	LB	NIR	Aaron Donnelly	Nottingham Forest	End of season	
31 January 2023	CF	ENG	Matty Taylor	Oxford United	End of season	

=== Loans out ===
Date from	Position	Nationality	Name	To	Date until	Ref.
5 July 2022	GK	BRA	Lucas Covolan	Chesterfield	End of season	
13 September 2022	CB	NED	Derek Agyakwa	Chorley	13 October 2022	
24 September 2022	LW	ENG	James Plant	Nantwich Town	24 October 2022	
31 January 2023	MF	ENG	Tommy McDermott	Salisbury	End of season	
31 January 2023	MF	ENG	James Plant	Salisbury	End of season	
4 March 2023	MF	ENG	Rhys Walters	Leek Town	End of season	
16 March 2023	GK	ENG	Reuben Perry	Wallingford & Crowmarsh	End of season	
