= Aaron Donnelly =

Northern Irish association football player (born 2003)

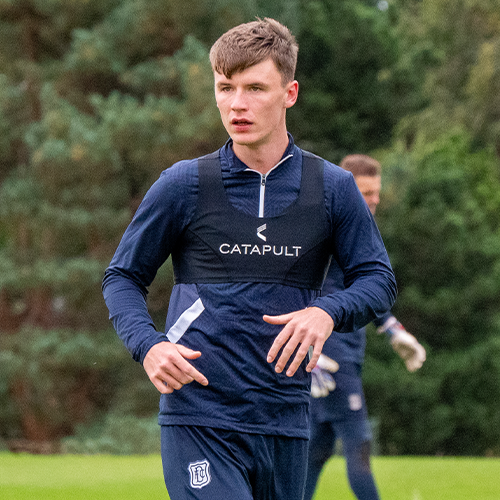
- Donnelly training with Dundee in 2023

Personal information
- Full name: Aaron Martin Donnelly
- Date of birth: 8 June 2003 (age 23)
- Place of birth: Magherafelt, Northern Ireland
- Height: 1.85 m (6 ft 1 in)
- Position: Defender

Team information
- Current team: Dunfermline Athletic (on loan from Dundee)
- Number: 25

Youth career
- Magherafelt Sky Blues
- 2015–2019: Dungannon Swifts
- 2019–2022: Nottingham Forest

Senior career*
Years	Team	Apps	(Gls)
2022–2025	Nottingham Forest	0	(0)
2023	→ Port Vale (loan)	20	(1)
2023–2024	→ Dundee (loan)	21	(0)
2024–2025	→ Colchester United (loan)	17	(0)
2025–	Dundee	13	(1)
2026–	→ Dunfermline Athletic (loan)	2	(0)

International career^{‡}
2019	Northern Ireland U17	2	(0)
2021–	Northern Ireland U21	16	(0)
2024–	Northern Ireland	1	(0)
- * Club domestic league appearances and goals as of 24 August 2026 ‡ National team caps and goals as of 15 October 2024

Aaron Martin Donnelly (born 8 June 2003) is a Northern Irish professional footballer who plays for Scottish Championship club Dunfermline Athletic, on loan from Scottish Premiership club Dundee, and the Northern Ireland national team.

A Northern Ireland international, he turned professional at Nottingham Forest in August 2021. He spent the second half of the 2022–23 season on loan at Port Vale and was loaned out to Dundee for the 2023–24 season. He joined Colchester United on loan ahead of the 2024–25 season before joining Dundee permanently in January 2025.

== Early and personal life ==
Aaron Martin Donnelly was born on 8 June 2003 in Magherafelt to Noel and Martina. He has family from Newcastle upon Tyne and is related to Dec Donnelly. He played gaelic football as a forward growing up.

== Club career ==
=== Nottingham Forest ===
In June 2019, Donnelly signed a deal with English side Nottingham Forest from Dungannon Swifts, who he had played for since he was twelve. He had been scouted by Gary Brazil and Bob Shaw whilst playing in the Victory Shield. In August 2021, Donnelly signed his first professional contract with Forest. That deal was extended at the end of the 2021–22 season when Forest gained promotion to the Premier League. He made his professional debut for Forest on 23 August 2022, when manager Steve Cooper started him in a 3–0 EFL Cup win over Grimsby Town. In December 2022, Donnelly had extended his contract with Forest.

==== Port Vale (loan) ====
On 23 January 2023, Donnelly joined EFL League One side Port Vale on loan for the remainder of the 2022–23 season. Manager Darrell Clarke said that Donnelly would provide competition on the left-side of defence following the departure of Connor Hall earlier in the month and noted that assistant manager Andy Crosby had coached the player with the Northern Ireland under-21s. Donnelly made his debut in the English Football League on 28 January, playing on the left-side of a back three alongside Nathan Smith and Lewis Cass as the Vale kept a clean sheet in a 0–0 draw at Cheltenham Town. On 4 March, he scored his first career goal to secure a 1–0 win over Milton Keynes Dons at Vale Park, and dedicated the goal to a deceased supporter whose memory was being honoured with a minute's applause as Donnelly's volley hit the back of the net.

==== Dundee (loan) ====
On 24 July 2023, Donnelly joined Scottish Premiership club Dundee on a season-long loan. Donnelly would suffer an injury in training shortly after, with Dundee manager Tony Docherty saying Donnelly "will be out for a while", and returned to Nottingham for treatment. He returned to Dundee ahead of schedule in September. He made his debut for the Dee on 28 October, starting in a 2–0 league victory away at Livingston. He missed ten weeks due to injury. He was diagnosed with Wolff–Parkinson–White syndrome and underwent surgery in January. He said he had a good 2023–24 season despite the initial injury and health scares, making 21 total appearances, helping Dundee achieve a top six finish and earning call-ups to the Northern Ireland senior squad.

==== Colchester United (loan) ====
On 28 August 2024, Donnelly joined League Two club Colchester United on loan for the 2024–25 season. He made his debut on the same day in the EFL Cup against Premier League club Brentford.

=== Dundee ===
On 8 January 2025, Donnelly was recalled from his loan spell with Colchester United, returning to Scottish Premiership side Dundee on a three-and-a-half-year deal for an undisclosed fee. The following day, Donnelly made his second debut for Dundee in a home draw against Rangers. Five days later, Donnelly scored his first goal for the Dee in a 3–3 draw at Celtic on 14 January. This was his sole goal in 14 appearances in the second half of the 2024–25 campaign.

He was not in manager Steven Pressley's first-team plans at the start of the 2025–26 season, though he was praised by Pressley for his attitude in training. Donnelly did not feature on the bench even when Dundee were reduced to only two recognised central defenders.

==== Dunfermline Athletic (loan) ====
On 30 July 2026, he joined Scottish Championship club Dunfermline Athletic on loan for the season. Donnelly made his debut for the Pars on 1 August in a draw away to Inverness Caledonian Thistle.

== International career ==
Donnelly has competed with the Northern Ireland national team at under-17 and under-21 level. He received his first call-up to the senior side in June 2023. He was again called up in March 2024.

Donnelly made his debut on 11 June 2024 in a friendly against Andorra at Estadio Nueva Condomina in Murcia, Spain. He substituted Ciaron Brown in the 69th minute of a 2–0 victory for Northern Ireland.

== Style of play ==
Donnelly is a left-sided defender who is aggressive in both defence and attack, providing crosses going forward, along with overlaps and underlaps.

== Career statistics ==
=== Club ===
As of match played 15 August 2026

Appearances and goals by club, season and competition
Club	Season	League			National cup (Note: Includes FA Cup, Scottish Cup)		League cup (Note: Includes EFL Cup, Scottish League Cup)		Other		Total	
Club	Season	Division	Apps	Goals	Apps	Goals	Apps	Goals	Apps	Goals	Apps	Goals
Nottingham Forest	2022–23	Premier League	0	0	0	0	1	0	—		1	0
Nottingham Forest	2023–24	Premier League	0	0	0	0	0	0	—		0	0
Nottingham Forest	2024–25	Premier League	0	0	0	0	0	0	—		0	0
Nottingham Forest	Total		0	0	0	0	1	0	0	0	1	0
Port Vale (loan)	2022–23	League One	20	1	—		—		—		20	1
Dundee (loan)	2023–24	Scottish Premiership	21	0	0	0	0	0	—		21	0
Colchester United (loan)	2024–25	League Two	17	0	1	0	1	0	3 (Note: Appearances in EFL Trophy)	0	22	0
Dundee	2024–25	Scottish Premiership	11	1	3	0	—		—		14	1
Dundee	2025–26	Scottish Premiership	2	0	0	0	1	0	—		3	0
Dundee	2026–27	Scottish Premiership	0	0	0	0	3	0	—		3	0
Dundee	Total		13	1	3	0	4	0	0	0	20	1
Dundee B	2025–26	—			—		—		2 (Note: Appearance(s) in the Scottish Challenge Cup)	0	2	0
Dunfermline Athletic (loan)	2026–27	Scottish Championship	2	0	0	0	1	0	—		3	0
Career total			73	2	4	0	7	0	5	0	89	2

=== International ===
Northern Ireland national team
Year	Apps	Goals
2024	1	0
2025	1	0
Total	2	0
