= Nathan Smith (footballer, born 1996) =

English footballer

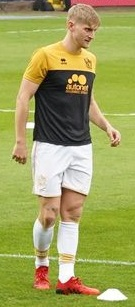
- Smith warming up at Vale Park in May 2022.

Personal information
- Full name: Nathan James Smith
- Date of birth: 3 April 1996 (age 30)
- Place of birth: Madeley, England
- Height: 5 ft 11 in (1.80 m)
- Position: Centre-back

Team information
- Current team: Tranmere Rovers
- Number: 5

Youth career
- 2009–2014: Port Vale

Senior career*
Years	Team	Apps	(Gls)
2014–2025	Port Vale	369	(21)
2014–2015	→ Stafford Rangers (loan)	28	(1)
2015–2016	→ Torquay United (loan)	39	(2)
2025–	Tranmere Rovers	46	(5)
- * Club domestic league appearances and goals as of 21:25, 5 May 2026 (UTC)

Nathan James Smith (born 3 April 1996) is an English professional footballer who plays as a centre-back for EFL League Two club Tranmere Rovers.

Smith turned professional at Port Vale in June 2014 and spent the 2014–15 season on loan at Stafford Rangers and the 2015–16 season on loan at Torquay United, winning the Player of the season award at Torquay. He made his Football League debut for Port Vale in August 2016 and went on to win the club's Player of the Year award for the 2016–17 relegation season. He helped the club to win promotion out of League Two via the play-offs in 2022 and was then again named as Port Vale's Player of the Year in 2022–23. He served as club captain for the 2023–24 relegation season and was then again promoted out of League Two before leaving the club at the end of the 2024–25 season. He then signed with Tranmere Rovers in June 2025.

== Early and personal life ==
Smith grew up in Madeley, Staffordshire and attended Madeley High School. He played for Madeley White Star; he helped his school to win the Sentinel Schools' Shield at Vale Park in 2012. He attended Stoke City games up until the age of 16, though stopped supporting the club as an adult. In 2021, he set up a coaching academy in Madeley with Port Vale captain Tom Conlon. Two years later, the pair set up a charity called Pro Level Vision to support disadvantaged children. The pair raised £20,000 at their first charity ball in 2024. Smith was given the nickname 'Smudger' at Port Vale. He had twins in 2025.

== Career ==
=== Port Vale ===
Smith signed his first professional contract with Port Vale in June 2014, with his initial deal running for 12 months. He was loaned out to Northern Premier League Division One South club Stafford Rangers in October 2014. The loan was later extended until the end of the 2014–15 season. He featured 35 times throughout the campaign, scoring one goal.

He joined National League side Torquay United on an initial three-month loan deal in July 2015. He impressed for the "Gulls" and the loan was later extended to cover the whole of the 2015–16 season. He made a total of 44 appearances at Plainmoor and was voted the club's Player of the Season and Young Player of the Season. Manager Kevin Nicholson described him as a "freak of nature".

"Stafford Rangers was my first taste of men's football. I had been playing in our youth team against people my own age and probably been one of the strongest on the pitch. Then going to Stafford Rangers and playing against grown men at the age of 18, you find that you are not the biggest and strongest out there. You have to try to adapt your game and play a little bit smarter against bigger strikers. Then going away to Torquay was when I grew up a little bit. I moved out from home, mum wasn't there to do the washing, cleaning and cooking."

— Smith reflecting upon his early loan spells in 2022

He made his League One debut for Port Vale on the opening day of the 2016–17 season, in a 0–0 draw with Bradford City on 6 August. His performance saw him named in the Football League Paper's League One Team of the Day. New manager Bruno Ribeiro had described him as the club's standout player during pre-season. He scored his first goal in the Football League on 16 August, with his header proving to be the only goal of the game against Rochdale. His performances saw him nominated for the League One Player of the Month award for August. This led chairman Norman Smurthwaite to open negotiations for a new contract as he admitted Smith was "on a boy's wage compared to the rest of the squad" and Smurthwaite anticipated offers for the player from Championship clubs in the January transfer window. Smith quickly agreed to a new contract to keep him at the club until June 2020. The Football League further recognized his performances by naming him as Young Player of the Month for August. Speaking in February 2017, caretaker manager Michael Brown said that Smith set a good example to his teammates by playing through a hamstring injury. He played every game of the campaign, mostly in a centre-back partnership with Remie Streete, and picked up all five of the club's end of season awards, including the Player of the Year award. However, despite Smith enjoying success on an individual level, Port Vale were in turmoil as they suffered relegation and the chairman subsequently resigned.

Brown was sacked early in the 2017–18 season after Vale slipped into the League Two relegation zone. His successor, Neil Aspin, stated that Smith was a "key player" but could improve in areas such as decision-making. He started all 54 of Vale's matches that season, making it two consecutive seasons of appearing in every game, though admitted he could have played better and that the team's finish of 20th in League Two was not good enough.

After suffering a dip in form at the start of the 2018–19 season, Smith was dropped for the home game with Crawley Town on 18 August, putting to an end his run of 110 consecutive appearances that he had made since his debut two years previously. Smith said he would take being dropped as a learning experience. He returned to the starting line-up and formed a solid partnership with Leon Legge, whilst Connell Rawlinson was moved to right-back. The three centre-backs then went on to form a back three in a 3–5–2 formation, which was instigated after a 6–2 home defeat to Lincoln City on 13 October and kept four clean sheets by the end of the month. By March he reached 150 appearances for the club before the age of 23, the youngest player to reach this landmark since Billy Paynter in 2005. Having played 51 of the club's 54 matches throughout the campaign, he was named as Vale's Young Player of the Year for the second time in three years.

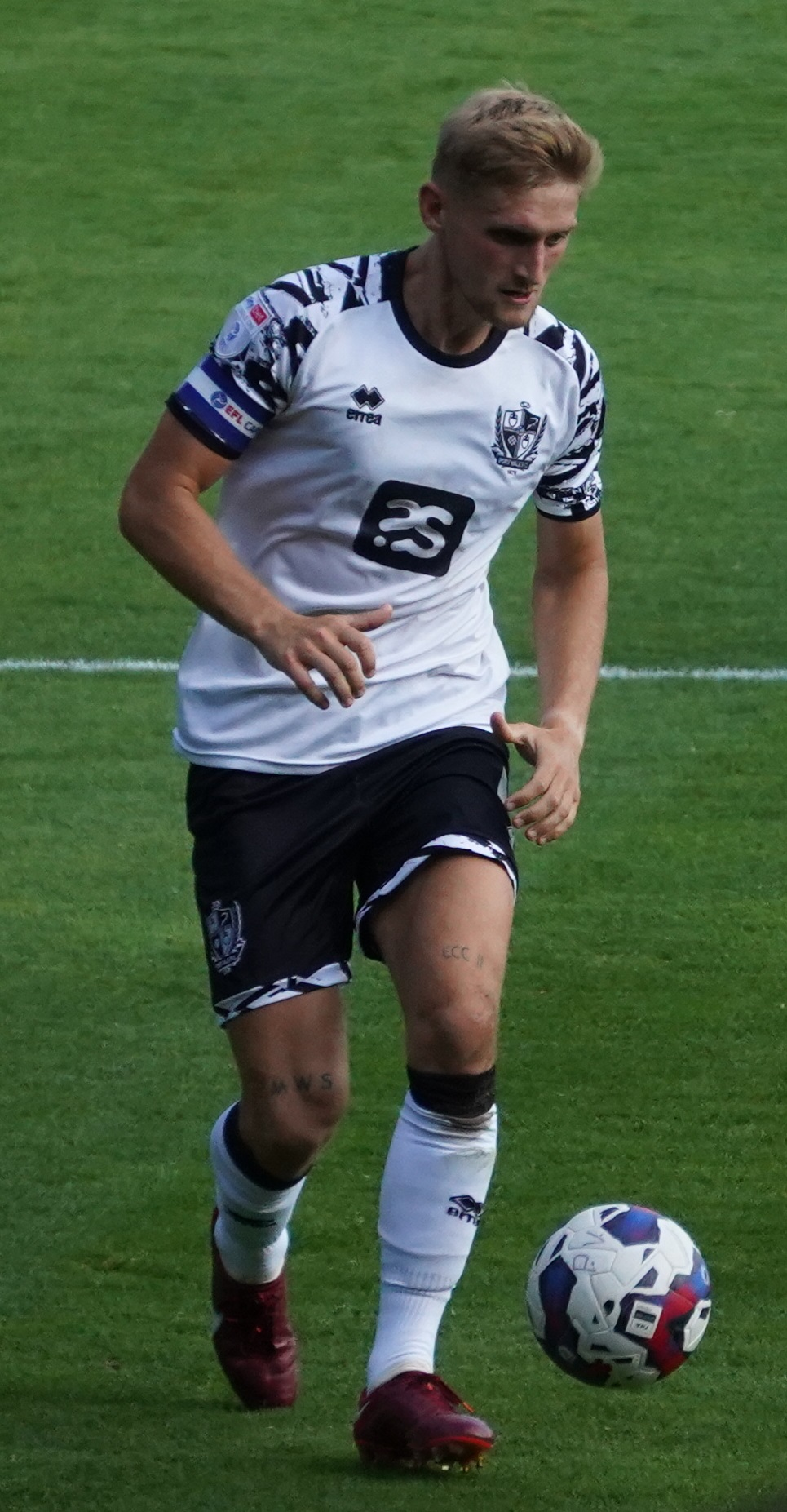
Smith playing for Port Vale (August 2022)

He started the 2019–20 season in a central defensive partnership with Legge, though was criticised by Northampton Town manager Keith Curle for allegedly manhandling 6 ft 5 in (1.96 m) striker Harry Smith. On 25 August, he scored his first goal in 20 months in a 5–2 defeat at Grimsby Town. Speaking in January, club captain Legge said that Smith was more confident and much improved from the previous campaign. His form led to rumours on social media of him making a move to Birmingham City. He lost his first-team place to Shaun Brisley in January due to injury, but impressed coach Danny Pugh with his performance at right-back in a 3–0 win over Colchester United on 15 February. He was offered a new contract after he ended the campaign with five goals in 41 appearances. Tom Pope nominated Smith as his Player of the Year for the 2019–20 season in his column in The Sentinel. Smith signed a new two-year contract in July 2020, despite interest from League One clubs. He said that he stayed due to his faith in the new ownership of Kevin and Carol Shanahan, his family being settled in the area, and the offer of stability during the COVID-19 recession.

Smith remained a consistent member of the defence during the 2020–21 season, only missing a run of games when he had to isolate after coming into contact with someone who has tested positive for COVID-19. Speaking in April, recently appointed manager Darrell Clarke described him as a "genuine winner" following a good run of defensive form for the team. Smith scored four goals from 50 appearances and was singled out for praise by Clarke again at the end of the season, who said that "Nathan Smith is the sort of character I want in this football club".

A consistent part of the back three during the 2021–22 season, he caused an opposition player to be sent off in two successive games as Crawley Town's Joel Lynch and Accrington Stanley's Colby Bishop were both dismissed for elbowing Smith in off the ball incidents. He started in the play-off final at Wembley Stadium as Vale secured promotion with a 3–0 victory over Mansfield Town; Michael Baggaley of The Sentinel wrote that "[Smith had] another solid performance at the heart of the back three after his outstanding effort in the second leg against Swindon had helped get Vale to Wembley". Smith was named in The Guardian's League Two team of the season. The club invoked their option to extend his contract by a further 12 months in June 2022.

On 8 October 2022, he helped Vale to win 2–1 at Derby County. He caused opposition goalscorer James Collins to be sent off after he elbowed Smith during a scuffle on the ground. He was voted as the club's Player of the Month for December after he helped the team to record two clean sheets in victories over Plymouth Argyle and Morecambe. He continued his good form into the following month and won a second consecutive Player of the Month award, starting all four of his club's January fixtures playing alongside Connor Hall, Dan Jones, Will Forrester, Lewis Cass and Aaron Donnelly in the back three. He also played all seven games of February, scoring against Barnsley, helping to keep a clean sheet against Exeter City, and having a goal against Accrington Stanley controversially ruled out. He signed a new two-year contract in April following weeks of "laid back" conversations with director of football David Flitcroft. Smith was voted as the club's Player of the Year for the 2022–23 season, having missed just one league game throughout.

New manager Andy Crosby appointed Smith as the club's new captain in July 2023. On 2 September, another opposition player was sent off for striking Smith, this time Oxford United's Mark Harris having lost his temper. On 4 November, Smith received the first red card of his career after being sent off for bringing down Mark Helm in a 0–0 draw with Burton Albion in the FA Cup. He was named as the EFL League One third-highest performer of the weekend after he contributed with a goal and "a tackle, an interception and six clearances, as well as six accurate long balls" in a 3–0 win over Blackpool on 29 December. However, his form dropped to the extent that he gave away a bizarre goal by passing to an opposition player from a quick free kick in the opening minutes of a 2–0 home defeat to Lincoln City in new manager Darren Moore's first home game in charge on 24 February. He rediscovered his best form after being moved to the middle of the back three towards the end of the campaign. Moore credited his return to form with a renewed focus on basic defending. Smith's 400th appearance for the club, a 2–0 defeat at Bolton Wanderers on 20 April, coincided with relegation from League One. The captaincy was removed from Smith following the end of the season.

Moore switched to a back four and dropped Smith entirely from the matchday squad at the start of the 2024–25 season. Ben Heneghan, Connor Hall and Jesse Debrah were all in good form and preferred ahead of Smith by Moore, with ball-playing midfielders or full-backs Tom Sang or Kyle John played on occasions when the trio of centre-backs missed out. Moore explained that Smith was absent from the team because he "had a personal situation and he had to be there for his family" but had "been training incredibly well". He made only his second league start of the season on New Year's Day, when he put in a man of the match performance in a 0–0 home draw with Cheltenham Town. Smith went on to say it had been "a very frustrating season" and stated that he felt he should have been given more gametime earlier on. Supporters voted him as their Player of the Month for February after he finished second in the voting for January. He remained a consistent part of the backline as Vale secured an automatic promotion place. However, he left the club upon the expiry of his contract after 16 years and 428 appearances.

=== Tranmere Rovers ===
On 23 May 2025, Smith signed a two-year contract – to begin on 1 July – with League Two club Tranmere Rovers. Manager Andy Crosby, who had coached him at Port Vale, said Smith was "a leader, a warrior, and a player whose availability makes him a consistent performer". Tranmere voted Smith as their player of the match on the opening day of the 2025–26 season, a 1–1 draw at Colchester United. He scored the equalising goal on the final day of the campaign, a 1–1 draw with Grimsby Town at Prenton Park that secured the club's League Two safety. This was his fifth goal in 52 appearances throughout the campaign.

== Style of play ==
Port Vale coach Gary Brabin said Smith needed to work on his ball-playing abilities and to be more vocal, whilst praising his dependability, pace, strength and passion. Pope would later say that "he's a nightmare and will annoy you for 90 minutes". Despite these annoyances, he boasts an excellent disciplinary record, having picked up 28 yellow cards and one red during his first 370 appearances for Port Vale; this was an average of one yellow card every 13 matches.

== Career statistics ==
As of match played 1 August 2026

Appearances and goals by club, season and competition
Club	Season	League			FA Cup		EFL Cup		Other		Total	
Club	Season	Division	Apps	Goals	Apps	Goals	Apps	Goals	Apps	Goals	Apps	Goals
Port Vale	2013–14	League One	0	0	0	0	0	0	0	0	0	0
Port Vale	2014–15	League One	0	0	0	0	0	0	0	0	0	0
Port Vale	2015–16	League One	0	0	0	0	0	0	0	0	0	0
Port Vale	2016–17	League One	46	4	3	0	1	0	3 (Note: Appearance(s) in the EFL Trophy.)	1	53	5
Port Vale	2017–18	League Two	46	1	3	0	1	0	4	0	54	1
Port Vale	2018–19	League Two	44	0	1	0	1	0	5	0	51	0
Port Vale	2019–20	League Two	34	5	3	0	1	0	3	0	41	5
Port Vale	2020–21	League Two	44	4	1	0	1	0	4	0	50	4
Port Vale	2021–22	League Two	44	2	3	0	1	0	5 (Note: 2 appearances in the EFL Trophy and 3 appearances in the play-offs)	0	53	2
Port Vale	2022–23	League One	45	3	1	0	1	0	2	0	49	3
Port Vale	2023–24	League One	42	2	4	0	3	0	1	0	50	2
Port Vale	2024–25	League Two	24	0	0	0	0	0	3	0	27	0
Port Vale	Total		369	21	19	0	10	0	30	1	428	22
Stafford Rangers (loan)	2014–15	Northern Premier League; Division One South	28	1	0	0	—		7 (Note: Statistics include one appearance in the FA Trophy, two appearances in the Northern Premier League Challenge Cup, two appearances in the Staffordshire Senior Cup, and two appearances in the Walsall Senior Cup.)	0	35	1
Torquay United (loan)	2015–16	National League	39	2	1	0	—		4 (Note: Appearance(s) in the FA Trophy.)	1	44	3
Tranmere Rovers	2025–26	League Two	46	5	1	0	1	0	4	0	52	5
Tranmere Rovers	2026–27	League Two	0	0	0	0	1	0	0	0	1	0
Tranmere Rovers	Total		46	5	1	0	2	0	4	0	53	5
Career total			482	29	21	0	12	0	45	2	560	31

== Honours ==
Port Vale

- EFL League Two play-offs: 2022
- EFL League Two second-place promotion: 2024–25

Individual

- Torquay United Player of the Season: 2015–16
- Football League Young Player of the Month: August 2016
- Port Vale Player of the Year: 2016–17, 2022–23
