= Tommy McDermott (footballer, born 2005) =

English footballer (born 2005)

Personal information
- Full name: Thomas Vincent McDermott
- Date of birth: 1 June 2005 (age 21)
- Place of birth: Manchester, England
- Height: 1.78 m (5 ft 10 in)
- Position: Midfielder

Team information
- Current team: FC Halifax Town

Youth career
- 2017–2018: Oldham Athletic
- 2021–2022: Port Vale

Senior career*
| Years | Team | Apps | (Gls) |
| 2022–2024 | Port Vale | 2 | (0) |
| 2023 | → Salisbury (loan) | 8 | (4) |
| 2023 | → Rochdale (loan) | 4 | (0) |
| 2023 | → Curzon Ashton (loan) | 2 | (0) |
| 2024–2026 | Burnley | 0 | (0) |
| 2025–2026 | → Shrewsbury Town (loan) | 34 | (1) |
| 2026– | FC Halifax Town | 0 | (0) |
- * Club domestic league appearances and goals as of 12:36, 5 May 2026 (UTC)

Thomas Vincent McDermott (born 1 June 2005) is an English professional footballer who plays as a midfielder for National League club FC Halifax Town.

McDermott turned professional at Port Vale in July 2022. He spent the second half of the 2022–23 season on loan at Salisbury and had loan spells at Rochdale and Curzon Ashton throughout the 2023–24 season, before being sold to Burnley in February 2024. He was loaned to Shrewsbury Town for the 2025–26 season. He signed with FC Halifax Town in September 2026.

== Career ==
=== Port Vale ===
McDermott spent time in the Academy at Oldham Athletic as a young teenager before he went into grassroots football. He was named as Youth Player of the Year at Port Vale for the 2021–22 season after scoring six goals and providing eleven assists for the under-18s. He turned professional in July 2022, signing a three-year contract with the club retaining the option of a further 12 months; David Flitcroft, the club's director of football, said that "he is a player that will develop physically, technically and tactically over time". He made his professional debut in the English Football League at the age of 17 when he started the opening game of the 2022–23 season on 30 July, a 2–1 victory over Fleetwood Town at Vale Park. Having been played out of position as a forward due to the club being short of strikers, he played his first game in midfield against Stockport County in the EFL Trophy. His strike in Vale's 3–1 win against Chesterfield in the FA Youth Cup in November was nominated for the LFE Goal of the Month award. On 31 January 2023, he joined Southern League Premier Division South club Salisbury on a youth loan, alongside James Plant. He scored two goals in a 3–0 victory at Metropolitan Police on 4 March. On 30 March, it was announced that the loan deal had been extended until the end of the 2022–23 season.

On 10 August 2023, he joined National League club Rochdale on loan for the first half of the 2023–24 season; manager Jimmy McNulty said that McDermott was signed to replace recalled loanee Cody Johnson. He failed to start a league fixture at Spotland and was recalled early from his loan spell on 7 November. Ten days later, he joined National League North club Curzon Ashton on loan. He played four games for Curzon.

=== Burnley ===
On 1 February 2024, McDermott joined Premier League club Burnley for an undisclosed fee after Vale's director of football, David Flitcroft, concluded that the under-21 side at Burnley would give him the playing time needed at that age. He made his first-team debut for Burnley on 28 August, in a 2–0 defeat at Wolverhampton Wanderers in the EFL Cup. He made his full debut on 11 January 2025, in a 3–1 win at Reading in the FA Cup. He joined Dundee on trial in June 2025, scoring in a 2–0 friendly victory over Arbroath on 28 June. However, Burnley triggered an extension in his contract the same day.

On 11 August 2025, McDermott joined League Two club Shrewsbury Town on a season-long loan. He was signed to provide competition for Sam Clucas, Alex Gilliead, Tom Sang, Harrison Biggins and Taylor Perry. He was sent off on his home debut at the New Meadow, following a clumsy tackle on Teddy Bishop 66 minutes into a 2–0 defeat by Colchester United. He scored his first league goal on 25 October, putting his team ahead in the 91st-minute of what ultimately ended as a 2–2 draw at Oldham Athletic. Manager Michael Appleton said in December that McDermott needed to raise his performance levels if he wanted to avoid being in and out of the side at times. He played 34 league games in the 2025–26 season, scoring one goal and getting two assists. He was released by Burnley upon the expiry of his contract. He had a trial at Cambridge United in July 2026.

=== FC Halifax Town ===
On 26 September 2026, McDermott signed with National League club FC Halifax Town on a deal until the end of the 2026–27 season. Manager John McGrath said "he'll add real quality". He scored his first goal for the club on 3 October, curling in a free-kick in a 2–0 victory at Solihull Moors.

== Style of play ==
McDermott is an attack-minded ball-playing midfielder.

== Career statistics ==
As of match played 2 May 2026

Appearances and goals by club, season and competition
| Club | Season | League | | | FA Cup | | EFL Cup | | Other | | Total | |
| Club | Season | Division | Apps | Goals | Apps | Goals | Apps | Goals | Apps | Goals | Apps | Goals |
|---|---|---|---|---|---|---|---|---|---|---|---|---|
| Port Vale | 2021–22 | League Two | 0 | 0 | 0 | 0 | 0 | 0 | 0 | 0 | 0 | 0 |
| Port Vale | 2022–23 | League One | 2 | 0 | 0 | 0 | 1 | 0 | 2 (Note: Appearance(s) in the EFL Trophy) | 0 | 5 | 0 |
| Port Vale | 2023–24 | League One | 0 | 0 | — | | 1 | 0 | 1 | 0 | 2 | 0 |
| Port Vale | Total | | 2 | 0 | 0 | 0 | 2 | 0 | 3 | 0 | 7 | 0 |
| Salisbury (loan) | 2022–23 | SL Premier Division South | 8 | 4 | — | | — | | — | | 8 | 4 |
| Rochdale (loan) | 2023–24 | National League | 4 | 0 | 1 | 0 | — | | — | | 5 | 0 |
| Curzon Ashton (loan) | 2023–24 | National League North | 2 | 0 | — | | — | | 2 (Note: Appearance(s) in the FA Trophy) | 0 | 4 | 0 |
| Burnley | 2024–25 | Championship | 0 | 0 | 1 | 0 | 1 | 0 | — | | 2 | 0 |
| Burnley | 2025–26 | Premier League | 0 | 0 | 0 | 0 | 0 | 0 | — | | 0 | 0 |
| Burnley | Total | | 0 | 0 | 1 | 0 | 1 | 0 | 0 | 0 | 2 | 0 |
| Shrewsbury Town (loan) | 2025–26 | League Two | 34 | 1 | 3 | 0 | 1 | 0 | 3 | 2 | 41 | 3 |
| FC Halifax Town | 2026–27 | National League | 0 | 0 | 0 | 0 | — | | 0 | 0 | 0 | 0 |
| Career total | | | 50 | 5 | 5 | 0 | 4 | 0 | 8 | 2 | 67 | 7 |
