= Tom Conlon =

English footballer (born 1996)

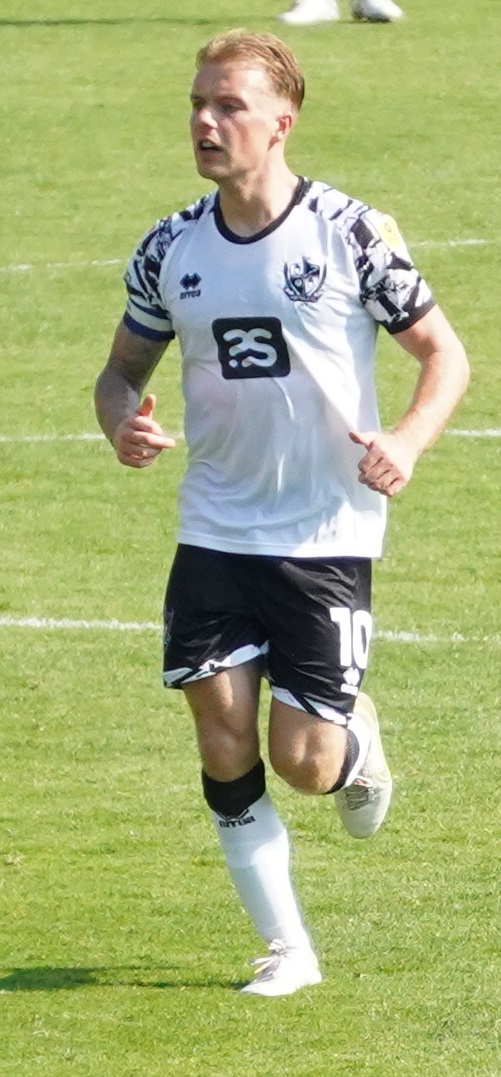
- Conlon playing for Port Vale

Personal information
- Full name: Tom George Sawyer Conlon
- Date of birth: 3 February 1996 (age 30)
- Place of birth: Stoke-on-Trent, England
- Height: 5 ft 8 in (1.73 m)
- Position: Midfielder

Team information
- Current team: Tranmere Rovers
- Number: 11

Youth career
- 2002–2003: Stone Dominoes
- 2003–2012: Stoke City
- 2012: Newcastle Town
- 2012–2013: Peterborough United

Senior career*
Years	Team	Apps	(Gls)
2013–2015	Peterborough United	1	(0)
2014	→ Stevenage (loan)	5	(0)
2015–2018	Stevenage	56	(2)
2018	→ Billericay Town (loan)	1	(0)
2018–2024	Port Vale	154	(18)
2024–2026	Oldham Athletic	58	(0)
2026–	Tranmere Rovers	0	(0)

International career
2024	England C	1	(0)
- * Club domestic league appearances and goals as of 14:16, 14 October 2025 (UTC)

Tom George Sawyer Conlon (born 3 February 1996) is an English footballer who plays as a midfielder for EFL League Two club Tranmere Rovers. He has represented the England C team. He is a descendant of Football League players George Heppell and Albert Pearson.

Conlon began his career in the youth set-up at Stoke City, later joining the youth academies at Newcastle Town and Peterborough United respectively. He made a handful of appearances in the first-team at Peterborough before signing for Stevenage on loan in September 2014, a deal that was subsequently made permanent in January 2015. He signed with Port Vale in July 2018, was appointed club captain in January 2021 and named Player of the Year at the end of the 2020–21 season. Vale were promoted out of League Two via the play-offs in 2022, though Conlon was unable to play due to injury. He joined Oldham Athletic in January 2024 on a two-and-a-half-year deal. He was promoted out of the National League play-offs with the club in 2025. He signed with Tranmere Rovers in June 2026.

== Club career ==
=== Early career ===
Conlon was raised in Porthill, near Stoke-on-Trent, and attended Wolstanton High School in Newcastle-under-Lyme. He spent a brief time of his early childhood with Stone Dominoes, before he began his career at Stoke City's academy, spending nine years at his hometown club before being released in the summer of 2012. He subsequently joined Newcastle Town's youth set-up, playing the opening two months of the 2012–13 season for the club's U17 and U18 sides. In October 2012, Conlon was spotted by scouts at Peterborough United whilst playing in the FA Youth Cup for Newcastle Town against Stratford Town, and subsequently signed for the then-Championship club on a two-year scholarship after a successful three-day trial. He spent the remainder of the campaign playing in Peterborough's U18 side. Conlon made his professional debut on 9 November 2013, coming on as a 68th minute substitute in a 2–0 win over Exeter City in an FA Cup first round tie at the London Road Stadium. He was given his first 18-month professional contract by manager Darren Ferguson the following month. He made three appearances in total for the first-team during the 2013–14 campaign, all of which were from the substitutes' bench.

=== Stevenage ===
Having not featured for Peterborough's first-team at the start of the 2014–15 season, Conlon joined League Two side Stevenage on loan on 13 September 2014 for the remainder of the year, with a view to a permanent deal in the January transfer window. He made his debut on the same day his loan move was announced, playing the whole match as Stevenage secured a 1–0 victory over Shrewsbury Town at Broadhall Way. His deal was made permanent in January 2015, with the manager Graham Westley saying he just needed to develop physically to make the most of his technical ability. He went on to make 14 appearances during his first season with the Hertfordshire club as they narrowly lost out on promotion after defeat in the League Two play-off semi-final. After being given the captain's armband for a pre-season friendly at the age of 19 by new manager Teddy Sheringham, the following season turned out to be Conlon's breakthrough in the first-team. He started the opening game of the campaign, a 2–0 home loss to Notts County and was a mainstay in the centre of midfield apart from five weeks at the end of 2015. Conlon scored the first professional goals of his career in Stevenage's 2–1 away victory over Hartlepool United on 9 February 2016, giving Stevenage their first win in nine matches. The first goal was a left-footed long-range effort that flew into the top corner before his second of the match came from close range to double his side's lead. He made 35 appearances in all competitions during the season without scoring any further goals, as Stevenage finished the season in 18th place.

After featuring in the club's opening five fixtures of the 2016–17 season, Conlon suffered a cruciate knee ligament injury in Stevenage's 2–1 victory over Luton Town. The injury ultimately ruled Conlon out of action for nine months, missing the remainder of the campaign. He signed a new contract with Stevenage in April 2017 after manager Darren Sarll stated that "he's had a really tough year ... [but] if he realises his potential he will be a terrific player". Ahead of the 2017–18 season, Conlon played his first match in just under a year when he played the first half in Stevenage's pre-season draw with Hitchin Town. He made his competitive return on 19 August 2017, coming on as an 80th-minute substitute in the club's 3–1 home win over Grimsby Town. The majority of Conlon's 15 appearances during the first half of the season were from the substitute's bench, and he was subsequently loaned out to Isthmian League Premier Division leaders Billericay Town on a one-month loan deal on 20 February 2018. He made his "Blues" debut on the same day, playing the first 75 minutes in a 2–1 away defeat at Folkestone Invicta. The match proved to be Conlon's only appearance of the brief loan spell as he returned to Stevenage early due to having a "slight injury". The 2017–18 season saw Conlon make 17 appearances in all competitions as Stevenage finished the League Two campaign in 16th position. He was released by new manager Dino Maamria upon the expiry of his contract in May 2018.

=== Port Vale ===
On 25 July 2018, Conlon signed a one-year contract with League Two side Port Vale after impressing manager Neil Aspin in pre-season friendlies whilst on trial at Vale Park. However, he picked up a thigh injury only a few days later, which ruled him out of action for the start of the 2018–19 season. He made his debut in a 1–1 draw with Forest Green Rovers on 8 September, a game in which Farrend Rawson was sent off for a "wild late challenge" on Conlon. On 22 January, Conlon himself was sent off after receiving two yellow cards in the space of four minutes during a 3–0 defeat at Bristol Rovers in the quarter-finals of the EFL Trophy; Aspin went on to say that Conlon had to learn from the incident and reduce any further ill-discipline in the future. On 12 March, he scored a "stunning" 25 yards (23 m) volley in a 3–0 home win over Yeovil Town, which would win him the club's goal of the season award.

He started the 2019–20 season with the club's number ten shirt and played alongside Luke Joyce and David Worrall on the left side of the Vale's midfield three until he was sidelined with a hamstring injury in mid-September. He was returned to the starting line-up upon his recovery, but then picked up a suspension after being shown a straight red card for elbowing Josh Gordon in a 1–0 home defeat to Walsall on 7 December. He scored his first goal of the campaign on 15 February, in a 3–0 home win over Colchester United, and was praised by coach Danny Pugh for his "brilliant" performance and work rate. He was signed a new two-year contract after he ended the campaign with one goals in 27 appearances.

On 19 September 2020, he scored a "stunning free-kick" and picked up an assist in a 2–0 win at Exeter City; the goal won him that month's League Two goal of the month award. Three months later he was highlighted as a player who should be attracting interest from higher division clubs in Guy Branston's column in The Football League Paper; Branston wrote that "I have been really impressed by his technique, movement, positioning and attacking ability". Interim manager Danny Pugh named him as the club's new captain in January 2021. He retained the captaincy under new manager Darrell Clarke, who said that Conlon was "not necessarily too vocal, but leading by example". On 20 April, he scored "a wonder goal" from just over the half-way line and later added a second in a 2–0 win at Barrow; the goal was later voted League Two Goal of the Month. He was nominated for April's League Two Player of the Month award for his three goals and an assist during the club's winning run. He was named as the club's Player of the Year at the end of season awards, and also won the Players', Club, Supporters' Club Player of the Year awards, as well as the Goal of the Season award for his goal against Barrow. He also won League Two's PFA Fans' Player of the Year award. His tally of eight assists was bettered by only four players in League Two. He signed a contract extension to keep him at the club until summer 2024, with Clarke stating that "he understands and believes in what we want to achieve and he epitomises what we want to build here".

He was sent off for a second bookable offence during a 1–0 home defeat to Walsall on 23 November 2021. In January 2022, he had an injection into his Achilles. He took rehab to recover from an injury that he had been struggling with for some time, causing him to miss four weeks of action. However, the procedure was not a success and he was later ruled out of action for the rest of the 2021–22 season after undergoing surgery. In his absence, his teammates secured him a promotion medal as Vale won the play-offs by beating Mansfield Town in the final. He retained his Club Player of the Year award as he "maintained all his captaincy responsibilities such as speaking to the team before, during and after games, displaying his outstanding leadership qualities".

He recovered from his injury by the start of the 2022–23 season, though said it took him four games to be able to play at "full tilt" again. Speaking in October, he admitted that his form was poor and that he was working hard to try and get back to his best. Clarke came out in support of Conlon, saying that "when I first came here he carried this club... I have nothing but praise for my captain". On 1 November, Conlon scored Vale's equalising goal in a 2–2 draw at Wycombe Wanderers; his performance won him the supporters' Player of the Match award. On 15 April, he was shown a straight red card following an off the ball confrontation during a 3–2 loss at Lincoln City; the red card was rescinded on appeal, however, the scoreline at the time of his wrongful dismissal was 2–1 in Vale's favour and manager Darrell Clarke was sacked in the aftermath of the defeat.

Conlon picked up a hamstring injury in July 2023 and was ruled out of action for three months. New manager Andy Crosby went on to appoint Nathan Smith as the new club captain. Conlon returned to fitness but found himself barely involved in the first half of the 2023–24 season.

=== Oldham Athletic ===
On 9 January 2024, Conlon signed for National League club Oldham Athletic on a two-and-a-half-year deal. He impressed on his debut, a 2–0 win over Barnet at Boundary Park, forming a good understanding with Josh Lundstram in central midfield. He featured 18 times in the second half of the 2023–24 season. He was named as club captain by manager Micky Mellon in August 2024. He was sidelined with an Achilles injury at the start of January 2025, missing two months of the season. He played 37 games across the 2024–25 campaign. He came on as an 84th-minute substitute in the play-off final victory over Southend United. He suffered cruciate knee ligament damage in October and was ruled out for the remainder of the 2025–26 season. He was named as Oldham Athletic's PFA Community Champion for the season, though was released upon the expiry of his contract.

=== Tranmere Rovers ===
On 25 June 2026, Conlon signed a six-month contract with League Two club Tranmere Rovers to reunite with former Vale boss Darrell Clarke.

== International career ==
Colnon was called up to represent the England C team in March 2024. On 19 March, he played the first half of a 1–0 defeat to the Wales C team at Stebonheath Park.

== Style of play ==
Conlon is a left-footed midfielder with good ball-control skills, vision and aggressiveness. He has good leadership skills. Former Port Vale teammate Tom Pope stated that "he's strong, wins his tackles, competes aerially and also has a great all-round attitude over 90 minutes".

== Personal life ==
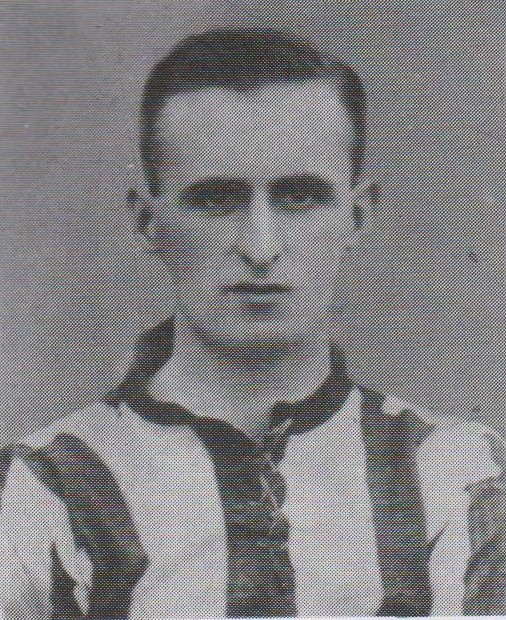
Albert Pearson played for Port Vale over 100 years before Conlon.

His great-grandfather, George Heppell, played as a goalkeeper for Port Vale from 1937 to 1952. Heppell's father-in-law, Albert Pearson, played for Port Vale, Liverpool and others in the 1910s and 1920s. In 2021, he set up a coaching academy in Madeley, Staffordshire with Port Vale teammate Nathan Smith. Two years later, the pair set up a charity called Pro Level Vision to support disadvantaged children. The pair raised £20,000 at their first charity ball in 2024. His partner, Lauren, gave birth to his first child in November 2023.

== Career statistics ==
As of match played 7 October 2025

Appearances and goals by club, season and competition
Club	Season	League			FA Cup		League Cup		Other		Total	
Club	Season	Division	Apps	Goals	Apps	Goals	Apps	Goals	Apps	Goals	Apps	Goals
Peterborough United	2013–14	League One	1	0	1	0	0	0	1 (Note: Appearances in the Football League Trophy / EFL Trophy)	0	3	0
Stevenage	2014–15	League Two	13	0	0	0	—		1 (Note: Appearance in League Two play-offs)	0	14	0
Stevenage	2015–16	League Two	32	2	1	0	1	0	1	0	35	2
Stevenage	2016–17	League Two	4	0	0	0	1	0	0	0	5	0
Stevenage	2017–18	League Two	12	0	2	0	0	0	3	0	17	0
Stevenage	Total		61	2	3	0	2	0	5	0	71	2
Billericay Town (loan)	2017–18	IL Premier Division	1	0	—		—		0	0	1	0
Port Vale	2018–19	League Two	34	3	1	0	0	0	4	0	39	3
Port Vale	2019–20	League Two	22	1	2	0	1	0	2	0	27	1
Port Vale	2020–21	League Two	42	10	1	0	1	0	4	0	48	10
Port Vale	2021–22	League Two	18	3	3	0	0	0	2	1	23	4
Port Vale	2022–23	League One	37	1	1	0	1	0	3	0	42	1
Port Vale	2023–24	League One	1	0	1	0	0	0	2	0	4	0
Port Vale	Total		154	18	9	0	3	0	17	1	183	19
Oldham Athletic	2023–24	National League	17	0	—		—		1 (Note: Appearances in the FA Trophy)	0	18	0
Oldham Athletic	2024–25	National League	30	0	3	0	—		4 (Note: 1 appearance in the FA Trophy and 3 appearances in the National League play-offs)	0	37	0
Oldham Athletic	2025–26	League Two	11	0	0	0	1	0	1	0	13	0
Oldham Athletic	Total		58	0	3	0	1	0	6	0	68	0
Tranmere Rovers	2026–27	League Two	0	0	0	0	0	0	0	0	0	0
Career total			275	20	16	0	6	0	29	1	326	21

== Honours ==
Port Vale

- EFL League Two play-offs: 2022

Oldham Athletic

- National League play-offs: 2025

Individual

- PFA Fans' Player of the Year: 2021–22 League Two
- Port Vale Player of the Year: 2021
