= Antwoine Hackford =

English footballer (born 2004)

- Hackford with AFC Wimbledon in 2026

Personal information
- Full name: Antwoine Lindon Lloyd Hackford
- Date of birth: 20 March 2004 (age 22)
- Place of birth: Arbourthorne, Sheffield, England
- Height: 5 ft 10 in (1.77 m)
- Position: Striker

Team information
- Current team: Swindon Town
- Number: 29

Youth career
- 2013–2020: Sheffield United

Senior career*
Years	Team	Apps	(Gls)
2020–2025	Sheffield United	3	(0)
2021	→ Alfreton Town (loan)	1	(1)
2024	→ Burton Albion (loan)	6	(0)
2024–2025	→ Port Vale (loan)	24	(4)
2025–2026	AFC Wimbledon	37	(3)
2026–	Swindon Town	10	(0)

International career
2019	England U15	3	(0)
2019	England U16	1	(0)
- * Club domestic league appearances and goals as of 13:38, 22 November 2026 (UTC)

Antwoine Lindon Lloyd Hackford (born 20 March 2004) is an English professional footballer who plays as a striker for EFL League Two club Swindon Town.

Hackford began his career with Sheffield United, spending 12 years with the club. He played on loan at Alfreton Town, Burton Albion, and Port Vale, with whom he won promotion from League Two at the end of the 2024–25 season. He transferred to AFC Wimbledon in July 2025, and Swindon Town in September 2026.

Hackford was capped by England up to under-15 and under-16 level.

== Club career ==
=== Sheffield United ===
Born in the Arbourthorne area of Sheffield, Hackford began his career at Sheffield United, joining the club at the age of nine, and taking part in the first-team's pre-season preparations ahead of the 2020–21 season. He became a scholar that year, and was included in The Guardian's 'Next Generation 2020' list of the best young players at Premier League clubs. He made his senior debut for the club on 2 January 2021, appearing as an 80th-minute substitute for Ben Osborn in a 2–0 away league defeat by Crystal Palace. At the age of 16 years and 288 days, he became their youngest ever player in the Premier League. Sheffield United manager Chris Wilder said he was "delighted" for Hackford. He turned professional in June 2021.

In December 2021, Hackford joined National League North side Alfreton Town on a one-month loan, going straight into the squad for the fixture at Curzon Ashton where he scored on his debut in a 2–1 win. Billy Heath, manager of the Reds, said that Hackford was "fantastic" before he "just ran out of a steam a little bit". However, he injured his ACL 11 days later while playing for Sheffield United in the FA Youth Cup, ruling him out for 11 months.

Hackford featured in two Premier League games when manager Paul Heckingbottom was short of attacking options at the start of the 2023–24 campaign, making cameo appearances in narrow defeats to Crystal Palace at Bramall Lane and away at Nottingham Forest. He signed a new two-and-a-half year contract in January 2024 after having scored 13 goals in that season's Professional Development League and Premier League Cup. On 1 February, Hackford joined League One club Burton Albion on loan until the end of the 2023–24 season. He featured from the bench six times for the Brewers under Martin Paterson.

On 30 August 2024, Hackford signed for League Two club Port Vale on a season-long loan. Manager Darren Moore stated that "he is another player who plays without fear and adds even further competition at the top end of the pitch". Hackford scored his first goal in the English Football League on 21 September, when his 95th-minute strike secured a 2–2 draw at Accrington Stanley. He scored a "terrific volley" in a 2–1 Boxing day defeat at Bradford City, after which he was praised by strike partner Jayden Stockley for his hold-up play and attitude. He scored four goals in 24 league games in the 2024–25 campaign, helping the team to secure an automatic promotion place.

=== AFC Wimbledon ===
On 30 July 2025, Hackford signed for newly promoted League One club AFC Wimbledon on a two-year contract, with the option for a further year. He scored his first goal for the Dons in an EFL Cup first round victory at Gillingham in August 2025. He quickly settled in at the club due to manager Johnnie Jackson playing in a similar style to Darren Moore, Hackford's previous manager at Port Vale. He scored six goals in 44 games across the 2025–26 campaign. This tally included the club's Goal of the Month for August and October, as well as the winning goal at Wigan Athletic that secured Wimbledon's safety from relegation.

=== Swindon Town ===
He signed a two-year contract with League Two club Swindon Town after being bought for an undisclosed fee on 1 September 2026, saying it was an "easy decision" after talking with manager Ian Holloway.

== International career ==
Hackford has represented England at under-15 and under-16 levels.

== Personal life ==
Born in England, Hackford is of Trinidadian descent. His brother is boxer Anthony Tomlinson.

== Career statistics ==
As of match played 21 November 2026

Appearances and goals by club, season and competition
Club	Season	League			FA Cup		EFL Cup		Other		Total	
Club	Season	Division	Apps	Goals	Apps	Goals	Apps	Goals	Apps	Goals	Apps	Goals
Sheffield United	2020–21	Premier League	1	0	0	0	0	0	—		1	0
Sheffield United	2021–22	Championship	0	0	0	0	0	0	0	0	0	0
Sheffield United	2022–23	Championship	0	0	0	0	0	0	—		0	0
Sheffield United	2023–24	Premier League	2	0	0	0	0	0	—		2	0
Sheffield United	2024–25	Championship	0	0	0	0	0	0	0	0	0	0
Sheffield United	Total		3	0	0	0	0	0	0	0	3	0
Alfreton Town (loan)	2021–22	National League North	1	1	0	0	—		0	0	1	1
Burton Albion (loan)	2023–24	League One	6	0	—		—		—		6	0
Port Vale (loan)	2024–25	League Two	24	4	1	0	—		4 (Note: Appearance(s) in EFL Trophy)	0	29	4
AFC Wimbledon	2025–26	League One	36	3	1	0	2	1	5	2	44	6
AFC Wimbledon	2026–27	League One	1	0	0	0	2	0	1	0	4	0
AFC Wimbledon	Total		37	3	1	0	4	1	6	2	48	6
Swindon Town	2026–27	League Two	10	0	0	0	0	0	3	2	13	2
Career total			81	8	2	0	4	1	13	4	100	13

== Honours ==
Port Vale

- EFL League Two second-place promotion: 2024–25
