= Diamond Edwards =

English footballer (born 2003)

Personal information
- Full name: Milan Diamond Lazane Edwards
- Date of birth: 18 September 2003 (age 23)
- Place of birth: Reading, England
- Height: 1.75 m (5 ft 9 in)
- Position: Midfielder

Team information
- Current team: Hungerford Town

Youth career
- 2016–2019: Reading
- 2019–2022: Southampton

Senior career*
Years	Team	Apps	(Gls)
2022–2024	Southampton	0	(0)
2024–2025	Port Vale	1	(0)
2025	→ Weymouth (loan)	5	(0)
2025	→ Hampton & Richmond Borough (loan)	5	(0)
2025	Walton & Hersham	9	(1)
2025–	Hungerford Town	6	(1)

International career
2018	England U15	1	(0)
- * Club domestic league appearances and goals as of 23:56, 24 December 2025 (UTC)

Milan Diamond Lazane Edwards (born 18 September 2003) is an English footballer who plays as a midfielder for Southern League Division One South club Hungerford Town.

Edwards was capped at England U15 level. He spent time at Southampton and Port Vale, as well as both Weymouth and Hampton & Richmond Borough on loan. He entered non-League football with Walton & Hersham in 2025 and later moved on to Hungerford Town.

== Club career ==
=== Southampton ===
Edwards joined Southampton from Reading in 2019. He signed his first professional contract in December 2020. He was a part of the Under-18s Premier League South title-winning team of the 2021–22 season. Manager Ralph Hasenhüttl brought him along to train with the first-team in Austria in July 2022.

On 23 August 2022, Edwards made his first professional appearance in a 0–3 victory against Cambridge United in the EFL Cup, replacing Ibrahima Diallo in the 90th minute. On 16 September, Edwards was forced off due to injury against Leeds U21; B team head coach Dave Horseman later revealed he suffered an ACL injury and would likely miss the remainder of the 2022–23 season. On 17 November, Edwards signed a contract extension until 2025.

=== Port Vale ===
He spent July 2024 on trial at Port Vale, where he impressed manager Darren Moore. On 14 August, Edwards joined Port Vale on a one-year contract. He scored on his debut for the Valiants six days later, in a 2–0 win at Salford City in the EFL Trophy. He made three further appearances before he joined National League South club Weymouth on a one-month loan deal on 27 January 2025. He made his debut for the Terras on the same day during a 2–0 loss at Hampton & Richmond Borough. He later joined Hampton & Richmond Borough on loan until the end of the 2024–25 season. He was released upon the expiry of his contract at the end of the 2024–25 season.

=== Walton & Hersham ===
On 9 August 2025, Edwards signed a one-year deal with Southern League Premier Division South club Walton & Hersham following a trial period; Swans manager Billy Rowley said that "he might just be the most talented and skilful player I have ever seen at Walton". He scored on his debut on 9 August during a 6–3 victory against Plymouth Parkway.

=== Hungerford Town ===
Edwards joined Southern League Premier Division South club Hungerford Town on 10 October 2025. He debuted during the 3–2 victory against Gosport Borough on 11 October, and he scored his first goal for Hungerford Town during the 5–3 victory against Sholing on 1 November.

== International career ==
Edwards represented England U15 during the 1–0 loss against Belgium U15 on 15 February 2018.

== Style of play ==
Edwards is an attacking midfielder with excellent dribbling skills.

== Career statistics ==
As of match played 18 November 2025

Appearances and goals by club, season and competition
Club	Season	League			FA Cup		EFL Cup		Other		Total	
Club	Season	Division	Apps	Goals	Apps	Goals	Apps	Goals	Apps	Goals	Apps	Goals
Southampton	2022–23	Premier League	0	0	0	0	1	0	—		1	0
Southampton	2023–24	Championship	0	0	0	0	0	0	0	0	0	0
Southampton	Total		0	0	0	0	1	0	0	0	1	0
Port Vale	2024–25	League Two	1	0	0	0	0	0	3 (Note: Appearance(s) in the EFL Trophy)	1	4	1
Weymouth (loan)	2024–25	National League South	5	0	—		—		—		5	0
Hampton & Richmond Borough (loan)	2024–25	National League South	5	0	—		—		—		5	0
Walton & Hersham	2025–26	Southern League; Premier Division South	9	1	3	0	—		1 (Note: Appearance(s) in the FA Trophy)	0	13	1
Hungerford Town	2025–26	Southern League; Premier Division South	6	1	—		—		1 (Note: Appearance(s) in the Berks & Bucks Senior Cup)	0	7	1
Career total			26	2	3	0	1	0	5	1	35	3
