= Ryan Croasdale =

English footballer (born 1994)

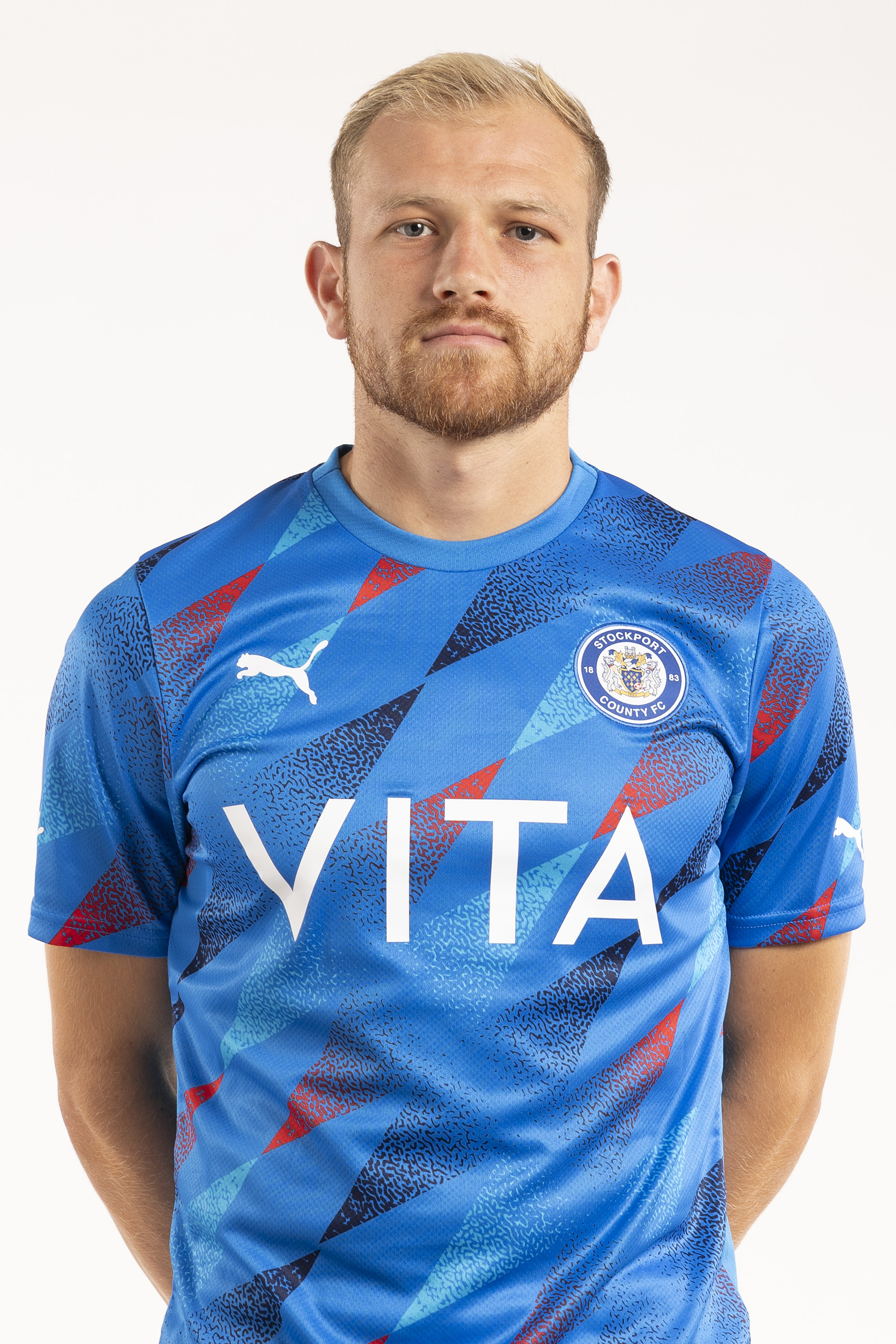
- Croasdale as a Stockport County player (July 2023)

Personal information
- Full name: Ryan Mark Croasdale
- Date of birth: 26 September 1994 (age 32)
- Place of birth: Lancaster, England
- Height: 1.75 m (5 ft 9 in)
- Position: Midfielder

Team information
- Current team: Port Vale
- Number: 18

Youth career
- 2003–2013: Preston North End

Senior career*
Years	Team	Apps	(Gls)
2013–2014	Preston North End	0	(0)
2013	→ Tamworth (loan)	2	(0)
2014	→ Stalybridge Celtic (loan)	14	(1)
2014–2016	Sheffield Wednesday	0	(0)
2016–2018	Kidderminster Harriers	75	(11)
2018–2020	AFC Fylde	80	(9)
2020–2024	Stockport County	158	(7)
2024–	Port Vale	77	(8)

International career
2017–2019	England C	6	(0)
- * Club domestic league appearances and goals as of 09:24, 31 August 2026 (UTC)

Ryan Mark Croasdale (born 26 September 1994) is an English professional footballer who plays as a midfielder for EFL League Two club Port Vale. He has also won six caps for the England C team.

Croasdale made his professional debut at Preston North End in 2013. From Preston, he was loaned out to Tamworth and Stalybridge Celtic. He was signed by Sheffield Wednesday in June 2014, though he did not feature in a first-team game in a two-year stay at the club. He entered non-League football with Kidderminster Harriers on a non-contract basis in August 2016. He signed a contract with the club and made 89 appearances in two seasons, scoring eleven goals and captaining the club. He was sold to AFC Fylde for £50,000 in June 2018 and won the FA Trophy with Fylde in 2019. He took a free transfer to Stockport County in September 2020. He made 184 appearances in four seasons with Stockport, winning promotion as champions from the National League in 2021–22 and League Two in 2023–24. He was released and joined Port Vale in June 2024. He was promoted out of League Two with the club at the end of the 2024–25 season.

== Club career ==
=== Preston North End ===
Croasdale joined Preston North End in 2003 and captained the youth team before turning professional in May 2013, signing a one-year contract at PNE. He made his first-team debut at the age of 19 in a Football League Trophy tie against Oldham Athletic at Deepdale, featuring for 45 minutes in a 2–0 defeat on 8 October. A month later, he joined Conference Premier side Tamworth on an emergency one-month loan deal. Croasdale only featured in two league games at The Lamb Ground, against Alfreton Town and Grimsby Town before returning to Preston at the end of the month. In February 2014, Croasdale made the switch to Conference North side Stalybridge Celtic on a loan deal for the remainder of the 2013–14 campaign. Celtic manager Keith Briggs was a former teammate of Preston manager Simon Grayson. Croasdale scored once during his loan spell, in Stalybridge's 3–1 away victory over Vauxhall Motors. Following the conclusion of the 2013–14 campaign, Croasdale was among six players released by Preston. Grayson challenged the released players to go away and prove themselves elsewhere.

=== Sheffield Wednesday ===
On 9 June 2014, following his release from Preston, Croasdale joined Sheffield Wednesday on a one-year contract. However, Croasdale failed to make an impact and was released two years later in June 2016. Croasdale went on to have an unsuccessful trial at Morecambe.

=== Kidderminster Harriers ===
On 19 August 2016, Croasdale opted to join National League North side Kidderminster Harriers on a non-contract basis following a successful trial game. A day later, he made his debut at Aggborough against his former club, Stalybridge Celtic, in which he featured for twenty minutes in a 2–1 victory. On 29 October, Croasdale scored his first goal for the Harriers in a 1–0 away victory over Stockport County, netting the only goal of the game in the 65th minute. Following an impressive first few months at Kidderminster, Croasdale was rewarded with a long-term contract. On 4 May 2017, Croasdale received his first call-up for the England C squad by manager Paul Fairclough for their fixtures against Panjab and Jersey.

After a 2016–17 season, in which Kidderminster reached the play-offs, Croasdale was appointed as club captain. Manager John Eustace said that "he is the glue that keeps everybody together". He went on to captain England C to a 3–2 victory over Wales C in March 2018. He was named on the 2017–18 National League North Team of the Year after being described as a "standout performer" and "as dependable as they come at this level" with seven goals and eight assists. Kidderminster qualified for the play-offs at the end of the 2017–18 campaign, though were beaten by Bradford (Park Avenue) at the quarter-final stage.

=== AFC Fylde ===
On 22 June 2018, Croasdale joined National League side AFC Fylde on a three-year deal for a club record fee of £50,000 after handing in a transfer request at Kidderminster. The transfer deal included "potential future payments and a substantial sell-on" and Kidderminster chairman Colin Gordon said "ultimately as a young man with a young family we have a duty to support him in his wishes and this is something he has specifically requested". Croasdale again captained England C in October, this time in a 1–0 win over Estonia U23. He scored in a 3–2 win over Stockport County in the semi-finals of the FA Trophy. He scored in a 3–1 win over Harrogate Town at Mill Farm in the play-off quarter-finals. Following victory over Solihull Moors in the semi-finals, Croasdale played in the 2019 National League play-off final defeat to Salford City at Wembley Stadium. Eight days later, on 19 May, Fylde returned to Wembley for the 2019 FA Trophy final, a 1–0 win over Leyton Orient. He scored five goals in 54 games throughout the 2018–19 campaign.

In January 2020, Croasdale credited his upturn in form to the new manager, Jim Bentley, who permitted him to advance and make runs into the opposition penalty area. He ended the 2019–20 season with seven goals in 43 appearances as the club were relegated following a second-from-bottom finish. Croasdale left AFC Fylde after refusing to agree to a pay cut during the COVID-19 pandemic in England and was branded by the club as "the unacceptable face of football" as they stated he had exploited the situation to "engineer a move away". However, The Football Association ruled in the player's favour.

=== Stockport County ===
In September 2020, Croasdale joined Stockport County on a free transfer after an acrimonious departure from Fylde. Manager Jim Gannon described him as a "vital" signing who possessed great athleticism, character and professionalism. Croasdale played 41 games as Stockport finished third in the National League at the end of the 2020–21 campaign. County qualified for the play-off semi-finals, where they were beaten 1–0 by Hartlepool United. He formed a "formidable midfield three" alongside Will Collar and Antoni Sarcevic under new manager Dave Challinor, who had previously coached him at AFC Fylde. He played all 44 of Stockport's league games throughout the 2021–22 season as the club won a place in the English Football League (EFL) as National League champions. After securing promotion, he signed a new contract to extend his stay at the club until 2024.

He started 39 league matches in the 2022–23 campaign as Stockport secured a play-off place with a fourth-place finish. Stockport defeated Salford City in the semi-finals of the League Two play-offs despite Croasdale missing his penalty kick in the shoot-out at Edgeley Park. He played against Carlisle United in the play-off final, which ended in a 1–1 draw, and he did not participate in the shoot-out as Stockport fell to a 5–4 defeat. He made 27 league starts as part of 38 appearances in the 2023–24 season as Stockport won promotion to League One as champions of League Two. However, he was one of seven players released upon the expiry of their contracts. He later admitted to feeling "low" due to his reduced time on the pitch, which was in part due to a hernia operation he underwent in February. He captained the club 17 times in the absence of Paddy Madden as part of his 184 club appearances in four years.

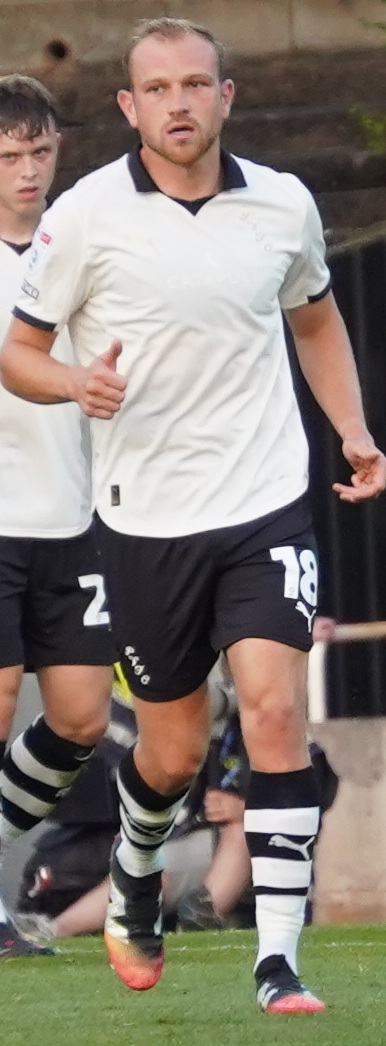
Croasdale as a Port Vale player, August 2025

=== Port Vale ===
On 17 June 2024, Croasdale agreed on a two-year deal with the recently relegated League Two side Port Vale, becoming manager Darren Moore's second signing of the summer. He had interest from higher division clubs, but Moore promised him the club would attain promotion. He was voted as the Valiants Player of the Month for August. He then lost his place due to illness, though was returned to the side against Notts County at the start of October and impressed in the absence of George Byers. On 19 October, he scored in a 3–1 home win over Fleetwood Town and also made two clearances, two interceptions and one tackle to win the fifth highest player rating in League Two that weekend according to WhoScored.com. He was named on The Football League Paper's Team of the Day for his goalscoring performance in a 2–1 win at Doncaster Rovers on 4 January. On 12 April, he scored and provided an assist in a 5–0 win over Bromley to secure himself a place on the EFL Team of the Week. He was named as the Port Vale Player of the Year at the club's end of season awards, also picking up the Supporter Club Player of the Season and Player's Player of the Season awards. He scored four goals in 45 league games throughout the 2024–25 campaign, helping the team to secure an automatic promotion place.

He said he was looking "to kick on and prove people wrong" and he prepared to play in League One for the first time at the age of 30. He sustained an injury against Burton Albion on 7 February 2026 and was ruled out of action for two months. He scored four league goals in the 2025–26 campaign, which culminated in relegation, becoming the club's second-highest league scorer after Devante Cole. He triggered a contract extension to remain at the club for another season.

Manager Jon Brady confirmed in October 2026 that Croasdale had been absent due to injury throughout September and would return to fitness in November. However, Brady reported in November that a setback in training had added a further six weeks to his recovery time.

== Style of play ==
Croasdale is a hard-working central midfielder who breaks up opposition play and passes the ball on to more technically gifted teammates. He has also played on the right side of midfield and at right-back.

== Career statistics ==
As of match played 29 August 2026

Appearances and goals by club, season and competition
Club	Season	League			FA Cup		EFL Cup		Other		Total	
Club	Season	Division	Apps	Goals	Apps	Goals	Apps	Goals	Apps	Goals	Apps	Goals
Preston North End	2013–14	League One	0	0	0	0	0	0	1 (Note: Appearance in Football League Trophy / EFL Trophy)	0	1	0
Tamworth (loan)	2013–14	Conference Premier	2	0	0	0	—		1 (Note: Appearance in Birmingham Senior Cup)	0	3	0
Stalybridge Celtic (loan)	2013–14	Conference North	14	1	0	0	—		0	0	14	1
Kidderminster Harriers	2016–17	National League North	37	4	1	0	—		6 (Note: One appearances in FA Trophy, two in National League North play-offs; three appearances in unspecified cup competitions)	0	44	4
Kidderminster Harriers	2017–18	National League North	38	7	2	0	—		5 (Note: Three appearances in FA Trophy, one in National League North play-offs; one appearance in unspecified cup competitions)	0	45	7
Kidderminster Harriers	Total		75	11	3	0	—		11	0	89	11
AFC Fylde	2018–19	National League	44	3	1	0	—		9 (Note: Three appearances in the National League play-offs and one goal, six appearances and one goal in the FA Trophy)	2	54	5
AFC Fylde	2019–20	National League	36	6	4	1	—		3 (Note: Appearance(s) in the FA Trophy)	0	43	7
AFC Fylde	Total		80	9	5	1	0	0	12	2	97	12
Stockport County	2020–21	National League	34	1	4	0	—		3 (Note: Two appearances in the FA Trophy and one appearance in the play-offs)	0	41	1
Stockport County	2021–22	National League	44	3	4	1	—		2	1	50	5
Stockport County	2022–23	League Two	44	1	3	0	2	0	6 (Note: Three appearances in the EFL Trophy and three appearances in the play-offs)	0	55	1
Stockport County	2023–24	League Two	36	2	1	0	0	0	1	0	38	2
Stockport County	Total		158	7	12	1	2	0	12	1	184	9
Port Vale	2024–25	League Two	45	4	0	0	1	0	1	0	47	4
Port Vale	2025–26	League One	31	4	1	0	3	0	4	0	39	4
Port Vale	2026–27	League Two	1	0	0	0	1	0	0	0	2	0
Port Vale	Total		77	8	1	0	5	0	5	0	88	8
Career total			406	36	21	2	7	0	42	3	476	41

== Honours ==
AFC Fylde

- FA Trophy: 2018–19

Stockport County

- EFL League Two: 2023–24
- National League: 2021–22

Port Vale

- EFL League Two second-place promotion: 2024–25

Individual

- National League North Team of the Year: 2017–18
- Port Vale Player of the Year: 2024–25
