= List of Sheffield United F.C. records and statistics =

This article lists honours and records associated with Sheffield United F.C..

== Club honours and best performances ==
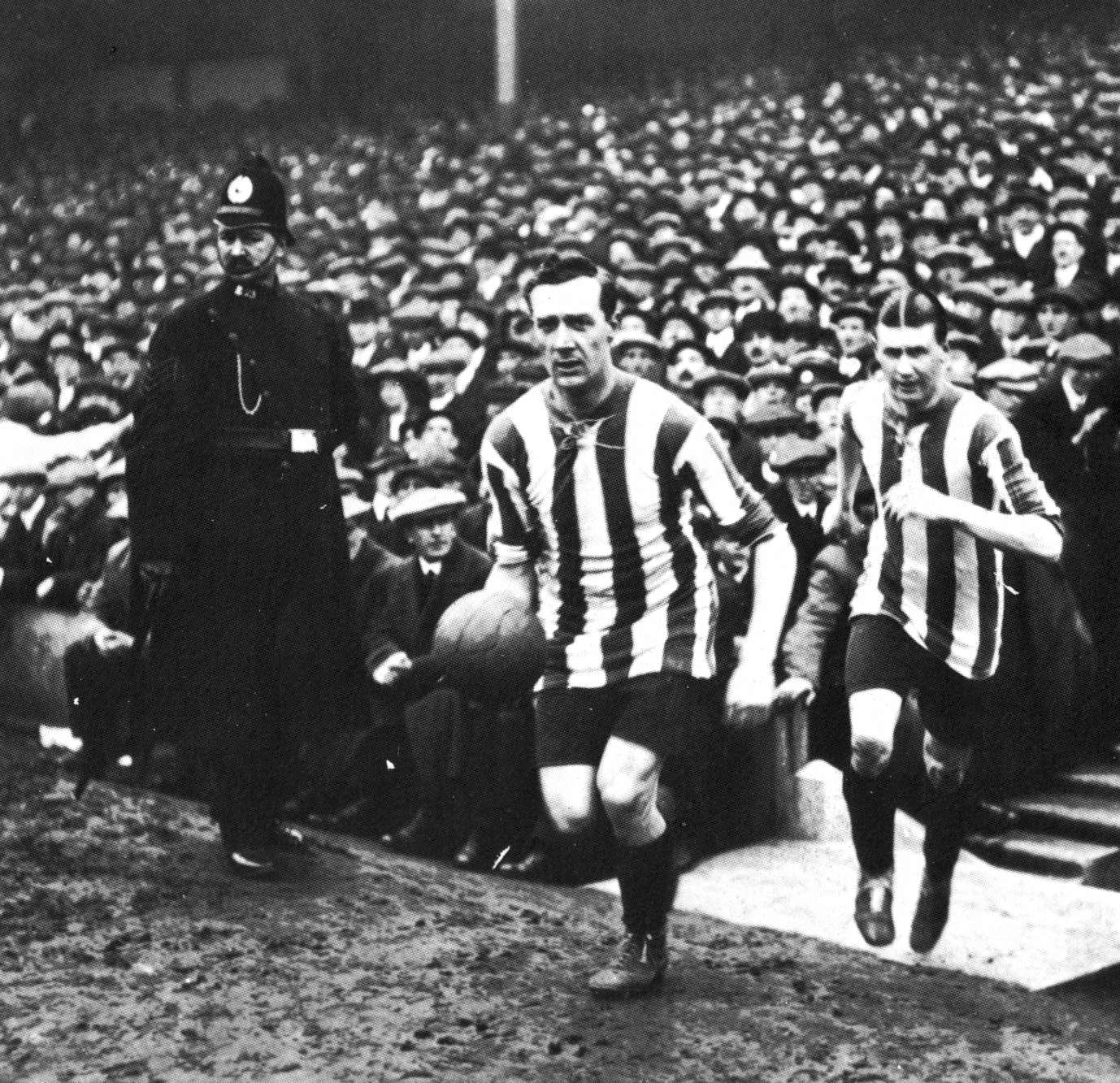
Captain George Utley leads Sheffield United out for the 1915 FA Cup final

=== Major domestic competitions ===
==== Leagues ====
First Division / Premier League (level 1)

- Champions (1): 1897–98
- Runners up (2): 1896–97, 1899–1900

Second Division / First Division / Championship (level 2)

- Champions (1): 1952–53
- Runners-up (7): 1892–93, 1938–39, 1960–61, 1970–71, 1989–90, 2005–06, 2018–19, 2022–23 (as The Championship)

Third Division / Third Division South / Second Division / League One (level 3)

- Champions (1): 2016–17 (as League One)
- Runners-up (1): 1988–89
- Promoted in third place (1): 1983–84

Fourth Division / Third Division / League Two (level 4)

- Champions (1): 1981–82

Football League North

- Champions (1): 1945–46

==== Cups ====
FA Cup

- Winners (4): 1899, 1902, 1915, 1925
- Runners-up (2): 1901, 1936

Football League Cup

- Best performance: Semi-final – 2002–03, 2014–15

Football League Trophy

- Best performance: North quarter-final – 2011–12, 2012–13, 2014–15, 2015–16

== Club records ==
=== League ===
- Record League Win: 10–0 away v Port Vale, Division Two, 10 December 1892 (Goals scored by Drummond, Wallace, Hammond (4), Watson (2) & Davies (2)) and 10–0 home v Burnley, Division One, 19 January 1929 (Goals scored by Harry Johnson 8th, 11th, 49th, 64th, Fred Tunstall 59th, 67th pen, Tom Phillipson 68th, 87th, Billy Gillespie 77th & Sid Gibson 86th)
- Record League defeat: 0–8 home v Newcastle United, Premier League, 24 September 2023
- Most League goals conceded against one club in a Premier League season – 13 goals over two matches (v. Newcastle United, Premier League, 27 April 2024
- Most League Points in a Season (2 points for a win): 60 in Division Two, 1952–53
- Most League Points in a Season (3 points for a win): 100 in League One, 2016–17
- Most League Goals: 102 in Division One, 1925–26
- Most League Wins in a Season (46 games): 30 in League One, 2016–17
- Most League Wins in a Season (42 games): 26 in Division Two, 1960–61
- Highest Percentage of League Wins in a Season: 72.7% (16 wins from 22 games) in Division Two,1892–93
- Most Home League Wins in a Season (46 games): 17 in League One, 2016–17
- Most Home League Wins in a Season (42 games): 16 in Division Two, 1936–37, 1958–59, 1960–61 & 1969–70
- Highest Percentage of Home League Wins in a Season: 90.9% (10 wins from 11 games) in Division Two,1892–93
- Most Away League Wins in a Season (46 games): 13 in League One, 2016–17
- Highest Percentage of Away League Wins in a Season: 56.5% in (13 wins from 23 games) in League One, 2016–17
- Most Home League Goals in a Season (46 games): 57 in Division Three, 1988–89
- Most Away League Goals in a Season (46 games): 50 in League One, 2016–17
- Highest Percentage of League Doubles in a Season: 47.8% in (11 doubles from 23 opponents) in League One, 2016–17
- Successive League Wins: 8 in 1892–93; 1903–04; 1945–46; 1957–58; 1960–61; 2005–06 & 2016-17 / 2017-18
- Successive Home League Wins: 11 in Division Two, 1960–61
- Successive Away League Wins: 6 in Division Two, 1892–93 & 6 in The Championship, 2024–25
- Successive League Games Without Defeat: 22 in Division One, 1899–1900
- Successive Home League Games Without Defeat: 26 in Division Four and Division Three, 1981–82 and 1982–83
- Successive Away League Games Without Defeat: 17 in The Championship/Premier League, 2018-19/2019-20
- Least Points in a Season: 22 from 42 games at 0.667 points per game in Division One in 1975-76
- Successive League Defeats: 8 in Premier League, 2020–21
- Successive Home League Defeats: 5 in Premier League, 2020 (31 October - 26 December) & 5 spanning two seasons in Division One, 1908 (28 March – 19 September)
- Successive Away League Defeats: 12 in Division One, 1898–99
- Successive League Games Without Victory: 20 in Premier League, 2019-20 & 2020-21
- Successive Home League Games Without Victory: 9 in Division One, 1975–76 & in Premier League 2019-20 & 2020-21
- Successive Away League Games Without Victory: 18 in Division One, 1975–76
- Successive League Clean Sheets: 8 in February & March 2014 in League One, 2013–14

=== Cup ===
- Record Cup Win: 6–0 home v Leyton Orient, FA Cup 1st Round, 6 November 2016.
- Record Cup Defeat: 0–13 home v Bolton Wanderers, FA Cup 2nd Round, 1 February 1890

=== Team ===
- Highest number of players to score a goal in a single season 19 in 2008–09 league season plus 1 in cup competitions.

=== Player records ===
- Most League Appearances: Joe Shaw made 631 appearances between 1948 and 1966
- Most Premier League Appearances: Oliver Norwood made 97 appearances between August 2019 - May 2024
- Most League Appearances by a Goalkeeper: Alan Hodgkinson made 576 appearances between 1954 and 1971
- Most Consecutive Appearances: Jack Smith made 203 consecutive appearances between 1935 and 1948
- Most League Substitute Appearances: Billy Sharp made 88 appearances between 2004 and 2023
- Most Ever Presents in a League Season: Alan Woodward: 5 seasons between 1968–1969 and 1974–75
- Most League Goals in Total Aggregate: Harry Johnson scored 201 goals in 313 games between 1919 and 1930
- Most Hat Tricks in Total Aggregate: Harry Johnson 20:- 18 in Football League & 2 in FA Cup
- Highest League Scorer in a Season: Jimmy Dunne 41 goals from 41 appearances, Division One, 1930–31
- Most League Goals in One Match: 5 Harry Hammond v Bootle, Division Two, 1892, and 5 Harry Johnson v West Ham United, Division One, 26 December 1927
- Scoring in Consecutive Games: Jimmy Dunne scored in 12 consecutive games, Division One, 1931–32
- Most Penalties Taken, Scored and Missed in all Competitive Games: Colin Morris: 54 Taken; 42 Scored; 12 Missed
- Highest Percentage of Penalties Scored from 10 or more attempts in Competitive Games: Tony Kenworthy: 90.9% (20 scored from 22 taken)
- Best Perfect Penalty Record: Peter Duffield: 7 scored from 7 taken
- Most Penalties Saved in all Competitive Games: Jack Smith saved 11 penalties between 1932–33 and 1947–48
- Most Sendings Off in all Competitive Games: Chris Morgan: 6 between 2003–4 and 2007-8
- Most Supporters' Club Player of Year Awards: Alan Woodward: 4 in 1969–70, 1973–74, 1975–76 and 1977–78
- Oldest Player: Jimmy Hagan: 39 years, 236 days
- Youngest Player: Louis Reed: 16 years, 257 days
- Youngest Player in Premier League: Antwoine Hackford, 16 years, 288 days
- Youngest Goalscorer: Regan Slater: 17 years, 60 days: v Grimsby Town, EFL Trophy, 9 November 2016
- Youngest League Goalscorer: Simon Stainrod: 17 years, 61 days: v Norwich City, Division One, 3 April 1976
- First League Substitute: Tony Wagstaff: replacing Alan Birchenall at Craven Cottage v Fulham on 8 September 1965
- First Scoring League Substitute: Ken Mallender: 25 April 1966 at Bramall Lane v Arsenal
- Most Capped Player : John Egan, has made 32 of his 34 appearances for Republic of Ireland as a Sheffield United player (as at June 2023)
- Record Transfer Fee Paid: £23.5 million for Rhian Brewster to Liverpool on 2 October 2020

=== Misc ===
- Longest Serving Manager: John Harris manager for 567 league games between March 1959 and December 1973
- Highest Attendance: 68,287 v Leeds United, FA Cup 5th Round, 15 February 1936
- Record gate receipts: £467,036 v Nottingham Forest, first division play-off semi-final, 15 May 2003
- Highest Average Home League Attendance: 35,094, First Division, 1947–48
- Lowest Official League Attendance: 4,014 v Nottingham Forest, Second Division, 27 April 1935
- Lowest Official FA Cup Attendance: 5,987 v Crewe Alexandra, 18 November 2014
- Lowest League Cup Attendance: 3,531 v Colchester United, 19 September 2000
- Lowest Modern Day Minor Cup Attendance: 1,827 v AC Ancona, Anglo Italian Cup, 5 October 1994
- Lowest Official Away League Attendance: 1,325 v Wimbledon FC, First Division, 7 April 2003
- Lowest Official Away FA Cup Attendance: 2,509 v Colchester United, 9 November 2013
- Lowest Away League Cup Attendance: 1,379 v Lincoln City, 5 September 2000
- Lowest Away Modern Day Minor Cup Attendance: 597 v Grimsby Town, EFL Trophy, 9 November 2016
