= 2024–25 Port Vale F.C. season =

113th season in existence of Port Vale FC

Port Vale F.C.
2024–25 season
- Owner: Synsol Holdings Limited
- Chairwoman: Carol Shanahan
- Manager: Darren Moore
- Stadium: Vale Park
- League Two: 2nd (80 points)
- FA Cup: First Round (eliminated by Barnsley)
- EFL Cup: First Round (eliminated by Barrow)
- EFL Trophy: Round of 16 (eliminated by Wrexham)
- Player of the Year: Ryan Croasdale
- Top goalscorer: League: Lorent Tolaj (14); All: Lorent Tolaj (15)
- Highest home attendance: 13,661 vs. Gillingham, 3 May 2025
- Lowest home attendance: 851 vs. Wolves U21, 3 September 2024
- Average home league attendance: 7,621
- Biggest win: 5–0 vs. Bromley, 12 April 2025
- Biggest defeat: 0–4 vs. Barrow, 24 August 2024
| Home colours | Away colours | Third colours |

The 2024–25 season is the 113th season in the history of Port Vale Football Club and their first season back in League Two since the 2021–22 season, following their relegation from League One in the previous season.

Manager Darren Moore signed twelve permanent and four loan players whilst allowing eight to leave. An opening-day win at Salford City seemed to justify a sense of positivity, only for this to be followed by one point from three games, including a 4–0 defeat at Barrow. Three wins from four league games in September saw Vale rise to fifth in the table and won Moore the League Two Manager of the Month award. Vale added 16 points from a possible 18 on offer in October to establish themselves as league leaders and win Moore a second Manager of the Month award. Despite winning only once in November, they remained top of the table, whilst exiting the FA Cup in the first round. The poor form continued, however, as three points from a possible 18 in December saw the Vale drop into the play-offs.

An unbeaten run throughout January and February kept the Vale in touch of the automatic promotion places. In March, 12 points from eight games – two of which had been rearranged from earlier in the season – kept them within four points of the top spot. Four wins from six games in April secured the club an automatic promotion place with one game left. The Vale's consistency and hard-to-beat quality was proven by them having the third-best records both home and away, as well as the fewest league defeats in the division.

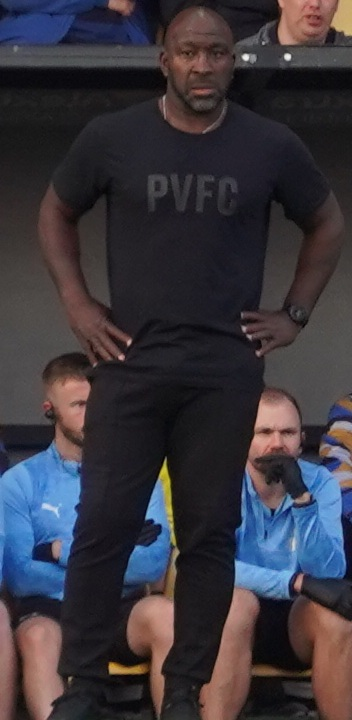
Darren Moore led the club to promotion.

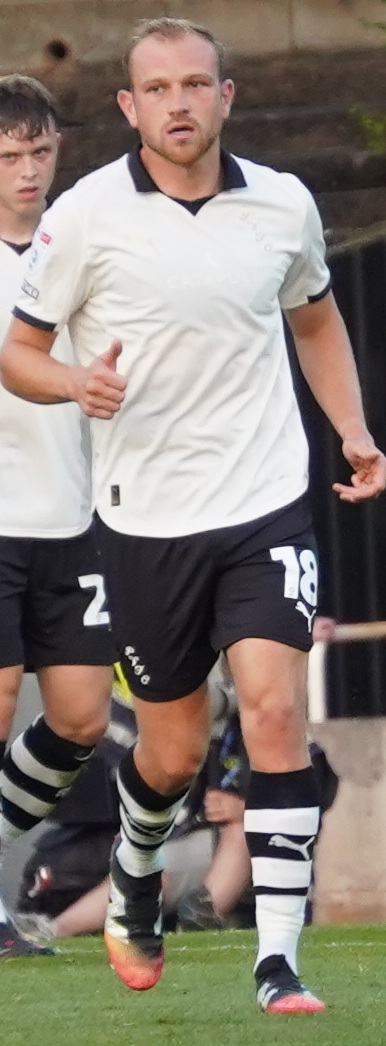
Ryan Croasdale was the club's Player of the Year.

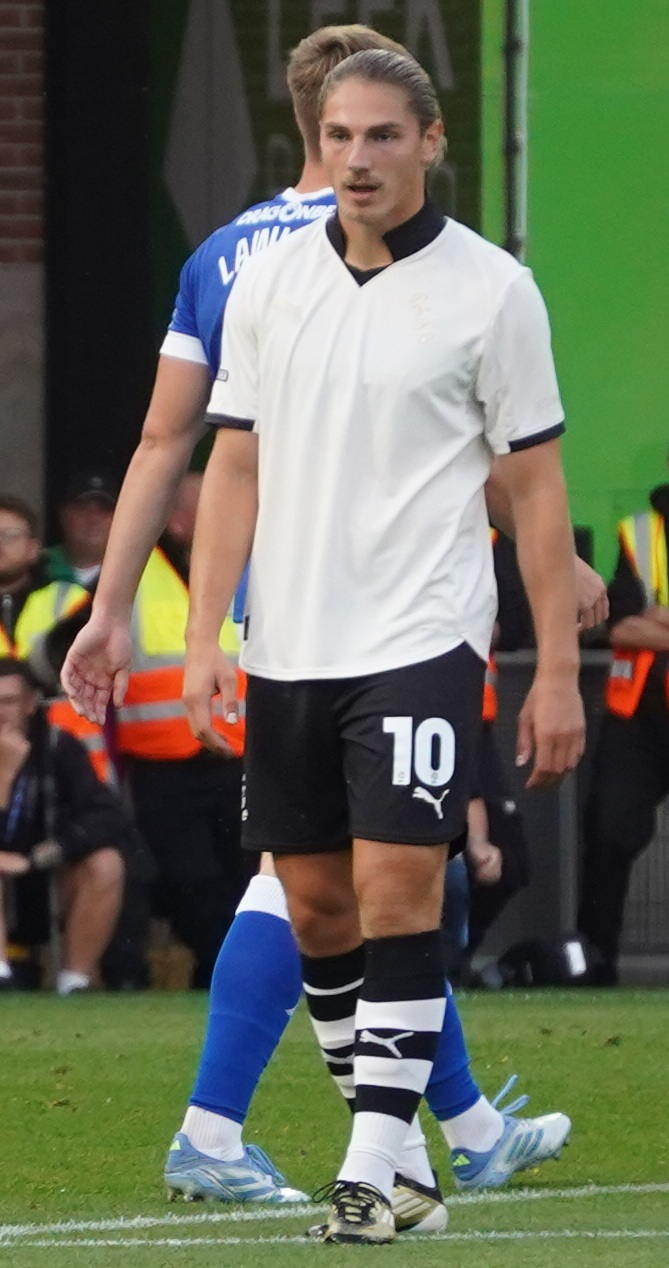
Lorent Tolaj was top scorer with 15 goals.

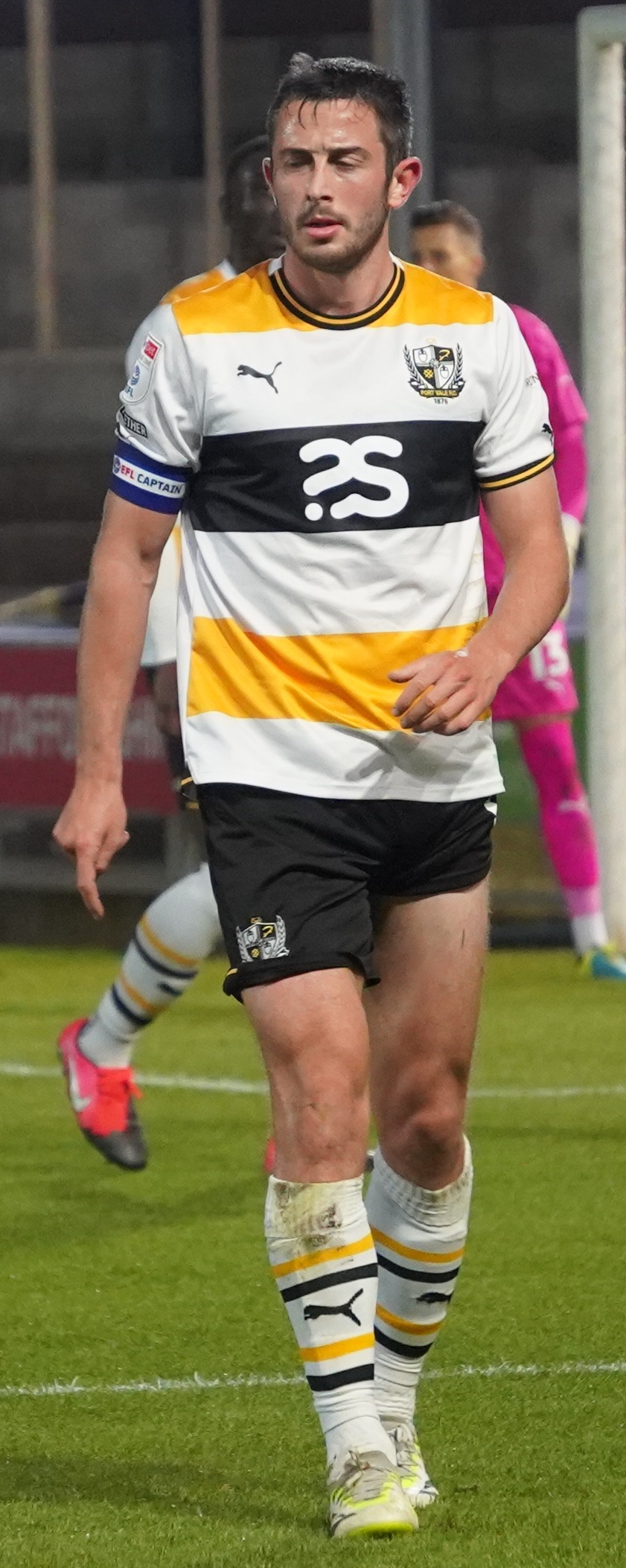
Ben Garrity was the club captain.

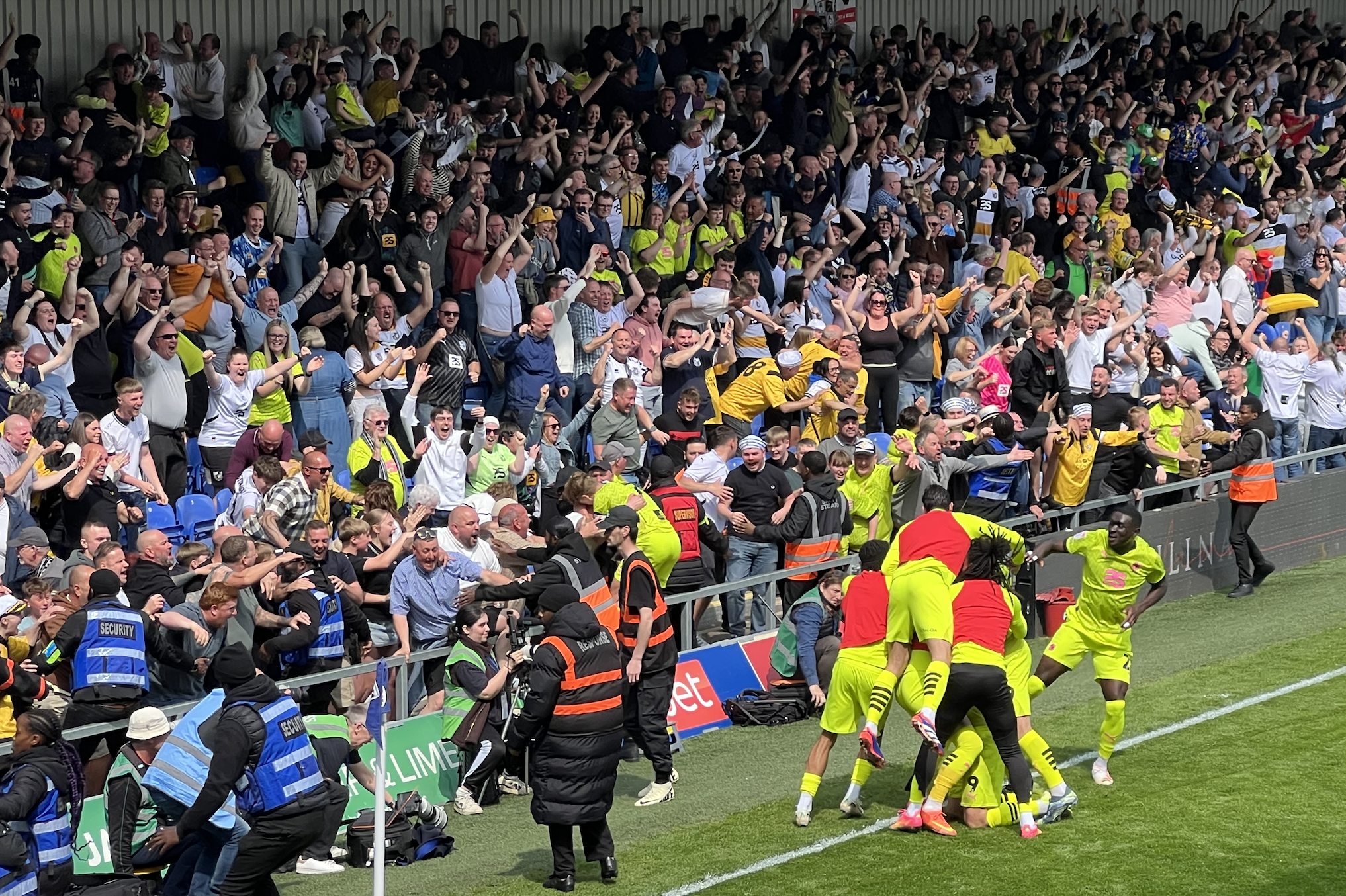
Port Vale players celebrate the goal promoting them back to League One with the away end at Plough Lane on 26 April.

== Overview ==
=== EFL League Two ===
Ronan Curtis was the first signing of the summer transfer window, as the Republic of Ireland international winger chose to leave League Two rivals AFC Wimbledon to join the Vale on a three-year contract. He was followed by 29-year-old defensive midfielder Ryan Croasdale, who had been released by League Two champions Stockport County. The club then paid an undisclosed fee to sign 30-year old striker Jayden Stockley from fellow-relegated League One club Fleetwood Town, with manager Darren Moore describing him as "an experienced striker with a proven track record of scoring goals". Sam Hart, a 27-year-old left-back who had previously played for the club on loan in 2016, was then signed to a two-year deal after choosing to leave relegated club Sutton United. Lorent Tolaj, a 22-year old Swiss striker, was signed for an undisclosed fee after a prolific season in the National League with Aldershot Town.

On 1 July, the club signed 34-year old goalkeeper Ben Amos following his release from League One club Wigan Athletic, and re-signed 31-year old defender Connor Hall back from Colchester United for an undisclosed fee. The signings continued with midfielder George Byers, who joined on a three-year contract following his release from Championship club Sheffield Wednesday. The first under contract player to leave the club was striker Ryan Loft, who was sold to Cambridge United for an undisclosed fee. The spending spree then continued with a "six-figure" fee for 23-year old Irish striker Ruari Paton from Scottish Championship club Queen's Park. Going the other way north to Scotland was Alex Iacovitti, who was signed by Scottish Premiership club St Mirren for an undisclosed fee. Ben Heneghan, a 30-year old centre-back known for his "combative, no-nonsense style of play", was signed on a free transfer from Fleetwood Town to replace Iacovitti. Benicio Baker-Boaitey, a 20-year old winger from Brighton & Hove Albion, became the first loanee of the season. Kyle John, an Everton youth-team graduate, was also signed after a successful trial with the club to a 12-month deal following a long-term injury to Mitch Clark. Bookmakers made the Vale fifth favourites for promotion.

Ben Garrity was appointed as the new captain and he scored both goals in a 2–0 victory at Salford City on the opening day of the season. Recruitment continued as Diamond Edwards was signed from Southampton's Academy on a 12-month contract. The first home fixture of the season was a 0–0 draw with Tranmere Rovers in front of a crowd of 8,102. Vale fell to a 4–0 defeat at Barrow, with all four goals coming in the second half. Summariser Phil Sproson said that he was shocked by the late collapse and that the game had looked balanced until the second goal was scored on 79 minutes. On transfer deadline day, Vale signed 20-year-old Jamaica international Brandon Cover on loan from Leicester City, attacking midfielder Rico Richards on loan from Aston Villa, and forward Antwoine Hackford on loan from Sheffield United respectively. On the morning following transfer deadline day, it was announced that Funso Ojo had left the club on a season-long loan to Shrewsbury Town, whilst Baylee Dipepa was sold to Southampton for an undisclosed fee. The month concluded with a 3–2 home defeat by Doncaster Rovers, with Luke Molyneux scoring a brace and assisting 38-year-old Billy Sharp for Doncaster's other goal.

On 7 September, Vale recorded a 4–1 away win at Newport County in a game that saw first league goals for forwards Stockley and Tolaj, with Newport ending the game with nine men after a reckless challenge on captain Garrity led to a straight red card for Ciaran Brennan, and a second yellow card was awarded to Kyle Jameson for directly kicking the ball out of play at the travelling Vale fans. They made it back-to-back wins the following week by beating Chesterfield 1–0 through a first-half goal from Ethan Chislett. They salvaged a point at Accrington Stanley a week later thanks to two goals past the 90-minute mark from Stockley and Hackford. Vale moved up to fifth-place with a 2–1 home win over Swindon Town after what opposition manager Mark Kennedy said was "a really ugly and physical game". Moore was named as League Two Manager of the Month, with the panel noting that "Moore had to gel a lot of new players and has done a brilliant job to get them organised so quickly".

On 1 October, the Valiants made it to five league games unbeaten with a 1–1 home draw with Colchester United, which would have been a victory if not for a 90th-minute equaliser from U's forward Samson Tovide. They then won 1–0 at Notts County, which left the Vale in sixth place after ten games and led Moore to declare that he was "happy but not satisfied" with his team. A double injury blow then left Moore without two of his best-performing players, as John and Byers were ruled out for some weeks. Undeterred, Moore led the Vale to a 1–0 win at Milton Keynes Dons to take the club to the top of the table for the first time in 11 years. Vale then produced a confident 3–1 victory over Fleetwood Town, with Richards opening the scoring with his first goal for the club, which extended the team's unbeaten run to eight league games. Paton then returned to the first XI and scored the only goal at Harrogate Town. Opposition manager Simon Weaver said that Vale were as strong a side as he has seen since his team were promoted into the Football League in 2020. A 3–2 win at home to AFC Wimbledon cemented Vale's pace at the top of the table on the first matchday since the unveiling of the John Rudge statue. Moore won a second consecutive Manager of the Month award.

Going into November, the squad was strengthened with the signing of 24-year-old midfielder Rekeem Harper, who had been a free agent since leaving Burton Albion in the summer, but was well-known by Moore from his time at West Bromwich Albion where he made his breakthrough into the first team. The team's unbeaten run came to an end at an out-of-form Gillingham, as a late goal from Jayden Clarke ended a game of few chances in the host's favour as well as Vale's run of clean sheets on the road. Morecambe had an 80th-minute goal ruled out for offside before Chislett gave the Vale victory just three minutes later. They had the chance to go six points clear with victory over local rivals Crewe Alexandra, with Jack Shorrock putting them in the lead on 3 minutes with a volley from outside of the area, however a second yellow card for league debutant Harper on 49 minutes left them on the defensive until they conceded a stoppage-time equaliser to Jack Lankester.

On 3 December, Curtis scored an equalising goal four minutes into stoppage-time to secure a 1–1 draw at Cheltenham Town. A 1–0 defeat at home to Walsall saw the visitors climb above the Vale atop the table. They then drew 0–0 at Bromley, where Connor Ripley pulled off several excellent saves; Stockley was denied a late winner as the officials did not see the ball crossing the goal line. The fans booed the players off after another 0–0 draw followed, this time at home to bottom-club Carlisle United. However, Moore said he took it as a compliment as he saw it as the fans expecting better of the players. Vale lost 2–1 at Bradford City on Boxing Day due to a brace from Bantams talisman Andy Cook, whilst Tom Sang was shown a straight red card in injury-time. A 3–0 defeat at Grimsby Town then saw the Vale drop out of the automatic promotion places, after which Moore apologised to the travelling supporters for the poor performance.

Moore made seven changes to the first XI on New Year's Day, including a league debut for goalkeeper Ben Amos, the result being a 0–0 draw at home to Cheltenham Town. The following day, he signed left-back Jaheim Headley from former club Huddersfield Town on a two-and-a-half year deal. Headley debuted in a 2–1 win away at Doncaster Rovers, Croasdale and Tolaj the scorers for Vale. Recruitment continued in the form of Crystal Palace striker Jemiah Umolu on loan until the end of the season and former academy product Rhys Walters, who rejoined the club as a free agent on an initial three-and-a-half year deal. Goalkeeper Nathan Broome was then signed on loan from Swansea City as Moore explained that Ripley was absent on paternity leave. Headley scored the winning goal on his home debut as Vale twice came from behind to beat Newport County 3–2. The following week saw the departure of summer signing Ruari Paton on loan to Dundee United until the end of the season, with Moore stating that "he will get vital, regular first team football at a very competitive level", but "very much remains in the club's future plans from the summer onwards". Stockley scored within the opening two minutes at Chesterfield, however, a red card to Clark was followed by an equalising goal from Armando Dobra when he capitalised on a mistake from Sang.

Sang was controversially sent off at home to Accrington Stanley on 1 February, however, Vale rallied to a 2–1 victory thanks to goals from Stockley and Tolaj. Connor Ripley and Conor Grant both left the club on transfer deadline day to Swindon Town and Accrington Stanley respectively, whilst Welsh teenager Finn Ashworth joined on loan from Wolverhampton Wanderers. Swindon Town manager Ian Holloway did not play Ripley against Vale on the following Saturday due to a "gentleman's agreement". The match saw six goals shared equally, as Vale came from behind to lose a 2–1 lead and then came from behind again to equalise as Tolaj completed a brace. Vale then recorded a 1–0 home win over promotion-rivals Notts County in front of the Sky Sports cameras after substitute Curtis volleyed home through the legs of Magpies stopper Alex Bass in the closing minutes of the game. A 2–1 home win over Salford City kept the good form going, though Curtis was sent off following a confrontation at the final whistle, but this was later rescinded following a retrospective FA review of the incident.

March began with a 1–1 draw away at Tranmere Rovers, who were being managed on an interim basis by former Vale manager Andy Crosby. Another disappointing draw followed as Vale failed to score at home against a Harrogate Town who were both poor in form and high in injuries. Yet another 1–1 draw was added to the unbeaten run, as a dull trip to Fleetwood Town came to life after 81 minutes when Hall's diving header was saved, Smith's resulting header was saved on the line, and then the home side scored on the counter-attack through Ryan Graydon. Tolaj secured a point in injury time from the penalty spot after Chislett was kicked in the face by Phoenix Patterson. The unbeaten run came to an end at Colchester United as Samson Tovide capitalised on a mistake by Smith and Fiacre Kelleher headed home from a Lyle Taylor free-kick after Richards had equalised. The first of three consecutive home games was a convincing 3–0 victory over Milton Keynes Dons, with goals from Tolaj, Stockley and Garrity upon his return off the bench from injury. They then overcame relegation-threatened Morecambe thanks to a last-minute goal from Curtis. A win in their game-in-hand over Barrow would take the Valiants into the automatic promotion places, however, the visitors took a first-half lead and though a half-time triple substituon from Moore changed the momentum of the game, Vale failed to score in the second half as Barrow completed a league double over Vale. A 1–0 victory at nearby Crewe Alexandra thanks to a late header from Stockley took Vale into the automatic promotion places.

Vale opened April with one of the season's best first-half performances in a 2–0 home win over second-placed Bradford City, ending three years without winning in the league at home on a Tuesday. This was followed by a 3–2 win at Walsall that knocked the home side off the top of the table for the first time since replacing Vale as league leaders after their win at Vale Park back in December. The game had an action-packed first half as Walsall had a goal ruled out after 12 seconds, Tolaj scored an overhead kick, Stockley handballed to give away a penalty to gift the visitors the first of two goals; Vale equalised and found the winning goal as Garrity scored on 41 minutes and Tolaj converted a penalty in first-half stoppage time. A 5–0 victory over Bromley in front of a season-high crowd of 10,864 saw the Vale return to the top of the table as other results went in their favour, with Tolaj scoring his second successive brace. It was the biggest crowd and biggest home win at Vale Park in 12 years. However, this was followed by a 3–2 defeat on Good Friday at relegation-threatened Carlisle United as Tolaj had a late penalty saved by Blues goalkeeper Gabriel Breeze, failing to complete a comeback from three goals down. On Easter Monday, Vale went two goals down at home to Grimsby Town, though came from behind to level the game in stoppage time with a second goal of the season for defender Jesse Debrah to ensure they only dropped down to second in the league table. Automatic promotion was secured with a 2–0 away win at AFC Wimbledon, thanks to two second half goals courtesy of Stockley and Headley.

The season concluded with a 1–0 defeat at home to Gillingham on 3 May, with a crowd of 13,661 at Vale Park – the biggest attendance for 27 years, it had more home fans in attendance for a league game that wasn't against Stoke City since a game against Crewe Alexandra in September 1963. Vale finished the season with the third-best home record and third-best away record in the division and no team lost fewer league games than Vale's ten. The team conceded the third-least goals in the division (46) and scored the second most headed goals (14). Moore opted to release all eight out-of-contract players: Andrew Buah, Ethan Chislett, Diamond Edwards, Rekeem Harper, Dan Jones, Jason Lowe, Tom Sang, as well as club legend of 16 years standing Nathan Smith.

=== Finances ===
The club maintained a similar budget to the 2023–24 season despite having been relegated and enjoying less revenue. The estimated revenue was £8 million to a total spend of £12 million, leaving Carol Shanahan to subsidise the club to the tune of £4 million, with the club having to pay £250,000 for a new public address system, £60,000 for the new Railway toilet block and £50,000 on replacing the groundsman's shed. The club won the League Two Community Project of the Season award for their 'Baby Bank' programme that provided clothing and equipment for those in need. The club posted a £6.1 million loss on the campaign, leaving the club over £17 million in debt to owner Carol Shanahan.

=== Cup competitions ===
In the first round of the FA Cup, Vale rested midfield duo Garrity and Croasdale and subsequently lost 3–1 at home to Barnsley (League One), who were managed by 2021–22 season promotion-winning manager Darrell Clarke.

Following their quarter-final appearance the previous season, Vale returned to their usual poor showing in the EFL Cup by losing 3–2 away to Barrow (League Two) in the first round, in a game that saw the first goal in a Vale shirt for new signing Paton, and a first career goal for Sang.

In the group stage of the EFL Trophy, Port Vale were drawn into Northern Group B alongside Salford City (League Two), Wrexham (League One) and Wolverhampton Wanderers U21. They returned to Salford for the second time in ten days and repeated their league result by claiming a 2–0 victory, with Edwards scoring five minutes into his debut. A 2–2 draw with Wolves U21 concluded with a 5–4 penalty shoot-out victory, with first competitive club goals for forwards Tolaj and Curtis. With advancement though the group already confirmed for both sides, Vale played out a 1–1 draw at home with Wrexham and Amos saved three penalties in the resulting shootout victory. Vale won 1–0 at Doncaster Rovers through a late Harper goal to make it through the first knockout round. They were then drawn against Wrexham again and took a surprise lead in the opening minute through Curtis, though ended up losing the game 4–1 in a game that saw a debut and only appearance in a Vale shirt for goalkeeper Nathan Broome.

== Results ==
=== Pre-season ===
Win Draw Loss Fixtures

| 5 July 2024 Friendly | Newcastle Town | 1–3 | Port Vale | Newcastle-under-Lyme |
| 19:30 BST | Barry 33' | Report | Tolaj 6'; Chislett 76', 78' | Stadium: Lyme Valley Stadium; Attendance: few hundred |

| 6 July 2024 Friendly | Kidsgrove Athletic | 0–1 | Port Vale | Kidsgrove |
| 13:30 BST | | Report | Curtis 43' | Stadium: Hollinwood Road |

| 9 July 2024 Friendly | Port Vale | 2–2 | Rushall Olympic | Burslem |
| 19:30 BST | Tolaj 49'; Trialist 65' | Report | 35'; 88' | Stadium: Vale Park Training Pitch; Attendance: 0 (behind closed doors) |

| 10 July 2024 Friendly | Leek Town | 1–0 | Port Vale XI | Leek |
| 18:00 BST | Grice 88' | Report | | Stadium: Harrison Park; Referee: Ashley Critchlow |

| 12 July 2024 Friendly | Coventry City | 3–0 | Port Vale | Loughborough |
| 13:00 BST | Simms 14'; Rudoni 74'; Obikwu 80' | Report | | Stadium: Loughborough University Stadium; Attendance: 0 (behind closed doors) |

| 20 July 2024 Friendly | Bath City | 1–0 | Port Vale | Bath |
| 15:00 BST | Wilson 5' | Report | | Stadium: Twerton Park; Attendance: 542 |

| 27 July 2024 Bass Charity Vase | Burton Albion | 2–0 | Port Vale | Burton upon Trent |
| 15:00 BST | Bodin 9'; Godwin-Malife 70' | Report | | Stadium: Pirelli Stadium; Attendance: 1,680; Referee: Tom Reeves |

| 30 July 2024 Friendly | Port Vale | 3–1 | Luton Town XI | Burslem |
| 19:30 BST | Curtis 20'; Hall 26'; Paton 69' | Report | Townsend 11' | Stadium: Vale Park; Attendance: 1,295 |

| 3 August 2024 Friendly | Port Vale | 0–3 | Bolton Wanderers | Burslem |
| 15:00 BST | | Report | Collins 1'; Adeboyejo 32'; Charles 74' | Stadium: Vale Park; Attendance: 2,173; Referee: Scott Simpson |

=== EFL League Two ===
==== League table ====
| Pos | Team | Pld | W | D | L | GF | GA | GD | Pts | Promotion, qualification or relegation |
|---|---|---|---|---|---|---|---|---|---|---|
| 1 | Doncaster Rovers (C, P) | 46 | 24 | 12 | 10 | 73 | 50 | +23 | 84 | Promotion to EFL League One |
| 2 | Port Vale (P) | 46 | 22 | 14 | 10 | 65 | 46 | +19 | 80 | Promotion to EFL League One |
| 3 | Bradford City (P) | 46 | 22 | 12 | 12 | 64 | 45 | +19 | 78 | Promotion to EFL League One |
| 4 | Walsall | 46 | 21 | 14 | 11 | 75 | 54 | +21 | 77 | Qualification for League Two play-offs |
| 5 | AFC Wimbledon (O, P) | 46 | 20 | 13 | 13 | 56 | 35 | +21 | 73 | Qualification for League Two play-offs |

Source: EFL Official Website
Rules for classification: 1) Points; 2) Goal difference; 3) Number of goals scored; 4) Head-to-head results; 5) Wins; 6) Away goals; 7) Penalty points (sec 9.5); 8) 12-point sending off offences
(C) Champions; (O) Play-off winners; (P) Promoted

==== Results by round ====
| Round | 1 | 2 | 3 | 4 | 5 | 6 | 7 | 8 | 9 | 10 | 11 | 12 | 13 | 14 | 15 | 16 | 17 | 18 | 19 | 20 | 21 | 22 | 23 | 24 | 25 | 27 | 28 | 30 | 31 | 32 | 33 | 34 | 35 | 36 | 37 | 29^{2} | 38 | 26^{1} | 39 | 40 | 41 | 42 | 43 | 44 | 45 | 46 |
|---|---|---|---|---|---|---|---|---|---|---|---|---|---|---|---|---|---|---|---|---|---|---|---|---|---|---|---|---|---|---|---|---|---|---|---|---|---|---|---|---|---|---|---|---|---|---|
| Ground | A | H | A | H | A | H | A | H | H | A | A | H | A | H | A | A | H | A | H | A | H | A | A | H | A | H | A | H | A | H | H | A | H | A | A | H | H | H | A | H | A | H | A | H | A | H |
| Result | W | D | L | L | W | W | D | W | D | W | W | W | W | W | L | W | D | D | L | D | D | L | L | D | W | W | D | W | D | W | W | D | D | D | L | W | W | L | W | W | W | W | L | D | W | L |
| Position | 5 | 5 | 14 | 16 | 12 | 8 | 9 | 5 | 7 | 6 | 1 | 1 | 1 | 1 | 1 | 1 | 1 | 1 | 2 | 2 | 2 | 2 | 4 | 5 | 3 | 3 | 4 | 6 | 6 | 6 | 6 | 6 | 6 | 6 | 6 | 6 | 4 | 4 | 3 | 3 | 2 | 1 | 1 | 2 | 2 | 2 |
| Points | 3 | 4 | 4 | 4 | 7 | 10 | 11 | 14 | 15 | 18 | 21 | 24 | 27 | 30 | 30 | 33 | 34 | 35 | 35 | 36 | 37 | 37 | 37 | 38 | 41 | 44 | 45 | 48 | 49 | 52 | 55 | 56 | 57 | 58 | 58 | 61 | 64 | 64 | 67 | 70 | 73 | 76 | 76 | 77 | 80 | 80 |

Source: EFL
A = Away; H = Home; W = Win; D = Draw; L = Loss; P = Postponed
Notes:
- ^{1} Matchday 26 (vs. Barrow) was postponed due to a frozen pitch.
- ^{2} Matchday 29 (vs. Colchester United) was postponed due to a waterlogged pitch.

==== Matches ====
Win Draw Loss Fixtures

| 10 August 2024 1 | Salford City | 0–2 | Port Vale | Kersal |
| 15:00 BST | | Report | Garrity 45+3', 69' | Stadium: Moor Lane; Attendance: 3,318; Referee: Martin Woods; Assistant referees: Daniel Jarvis, Andrew Ellis; Fourth official: Simon Clayton |

| 17 August 2024 2 | Port Vale | 0–0 | Tranmere Rovers | Burslem |
| 15:00 BST | | Report | | Stadium: Vale Park; Attendance: 8,102; Referee: James Oldham; Assistant referees: Daniel Smith, Anthony Moore; Fourth official: Grant Taylor |

| 24 August 2024 3 | Barrow | 4–0 | Port Vale | Barrow-in-Furness |
| 15:00 BST | Garner 54'; Acquah 79'; Spence 81'; Telford 90+5' | Report | | Stadium: Holker Street; Attendance: 3,481; Referee: Declan Bourne; Assistant referees: Bradley Hall, Zharir Mustafa; Fourth official: Jamie Waters |

| 31 August 2024 4 | Port Vale | 2–3 | Doncaster Rovers | Burslem |
| 12:30 BST | Croasdale 30'; Chislett 87' (pen.) | Report | Molyneux 16', 58'; Sharp 46' | Stadium: Vale Park; Attendance: 5,454; Referee: Adam Herczeg; Assistant referees: Wayne Grunnill, Adam Ricketts; Fourth official: Daniel Middleton |
Note: Fixture was initially scheduled for a 15:00 kick-off but was moved for live Sky Sports broadcast.

| 7 September 2024 5 | Newport County | 1–4 | Port Vale | Newport |
| 15:00 BST | Wildig 24' | Report | Stockley 6', 36'; Chislett 48'; Tolaj 54' | Stadium: Rodney Parade; Attendance: 4,851; Referee: Stephen Parkinson; Assistant referees: Kevin Howick, Christopher Husband; Fourth official: Steven Plane |

| 14 September 2024 6 | Port Vale | 1–0 | Chesterfield | Burslem |
| 15:00 BST | Chislett 11' | Report | | Stadium: Vale Park; Attendance: 7,976; Referee: Neil Hair; Assistant referees: Richard Morris, Jack Clench; Fourth official: Daniel Robinson |

| 21 September 2024 7 | Accrington Stanley | 2–2 | Port Vale | Accrington |
| 12:30 BST | Whalley 29'; Love 43' | Report | Stockley 90'; Hackford 90+5' | Stadium: Crown Ground; Attendance: 2,628; Referee: Jacob Miles; Assistant referees: Oliver Bickle, Daniel Tracey; Fourth official: John Mulligan |
Note: Fixture was initially scheduled for a 15:00 kick-off but was moved for live Sky Sports broadcast.

| 28 September 2024 8 | Port Vale | 2–1 | Swindon Town | Burslem |
| 15:00 BST | Byers 61'; Cover 85' | Report | Wright 89' | Stadium: Vale Park; Attendance: 6,747; Referee: Thomas Parsons; Assistant referees: Jack Forder, Daniel Jarvis; Fourth official: Grant Taylor |

| 1 October 2024 9 | Port Vale | 1–1 | Colchester United | Burslem |
| 19:30 BST | Debrah 55' | Report | Tovide 90' | Stadium: Vale Park; Attendance: 4,533; Referee: Simon Mather; Assistant referees: Ryan Williams, William Cavanagh; Fourth official: Callum Gough |

| 5 October 2024 10 | Notts County | 0–1 | Port Vale | Nottingham |
| 15:00 BST | | Report | Tolaj 23' | Stadium: Meadow Lane; Attendance: 11,974; Referee: Sam Purkiss; Assistant referees: Andrew Bennett, Dumitru-Ravel Cheosiaua; Fourth official: Phil Joslin |

| 12 October 2024 11 | Milton Keynes Dons | 0–1 | Port Vale | Milton Keynes |
| 15:00 BST | | Report | Hackford 77' | Stadium: Stadium MK; Attendance: 6,855; Referee: David Rock; Assistant referees: Darren Wilding, David Nicholson; Fourth official: Declan Ford |

| 19 October 2024 12 | Port Vale | 3–1 | Fleetwood Town | Burslem |
| 15:00 BST | Richards 33'; Croasdale 67'; Curtis 73' | Report | Johnston 36' | Stadium: Vale Park; Attendance: 6,643; Referee: John Mulligan; Assistant referees: Alistair Nelson, Abbas Khan; Fourth official: Emily Carney |

| 22 October 2024 13 | Harrogate Town | 0–1 | Port Vale | Harrogate |
| 19:45 BST | | Report | Paton 54' | Stadium: Wetherby Road; Attendance: 2,780; Referee: Elliot Bell; Assistant referees: Oliver Bickle, Jacob Graham; Fourth official: Jake Topp |

| 26 October 2024 14 | Port Vale | 3–2 | AFC Wimbledon | Burslem |
| 15:00 BST | Cover 9'; Richards 11'; Stockley 62' | Report | Neufville 61'; Hippolyte 78' | Stadium: Vale Park; Attendance: 7,163; Referee: Aaron Bannister; Assistant referees: Ollie Williams, Harley McKittrick; Fourth official: Martin Parker |

| 9 November 2024 15 | Gillingham | 1–0 | Port Vale | Gillingham |
| 15:00 GMT | Clarke 79' | Report | | Stadium: Priestfield Stadium; Attendance: 6,267; Referee: Alan Young; Assistant referees: Anthony Da Costa, Daniel Bonneywell; Fourth official: Stephen Brown |

| 16 November 2024 16 | Morecambe | 0–1 | Port Vale | Morecambe |
| 15:00 GMT | | Report | Chislett 83' | Stadium: Mazuma Mobile Stadium; Attendance: 4,150; Referee: Zac Kennard-Kettle; Assistant referees: Joseph Pettitt, Scott Henry; Fourth official: Karl Buckley |

| 25 November 2024 17 | Port Vale | 1–1 | Crewe Alexandra | Burslem |
| 20:00 GMT | Shorrock 3' | Report | Lankester 90+2' | Stadium: Vale Park; Attendance: 10,022; Referee: Thomas Kirk; Assistant referees: Grant Taylor, Conor Brown; Fourth official: Elliot Bell |
Note: Fixture was initially scheduled for 23 November but was moved for live Sky Sports broadcast.

| 3 December 2024 18 | Cheltenham Town | 1–1 | Port Vale | Cheltenham |
| 19:45 GMT | Miller 53' | Report | Curtis 90+4' | Stadium: Whaddon Road; Attendance: 3,245; Referee: Scott Tallis; Assistant referees: Oliver Bickle, Jason Roberts; Fourth official: Niall Felton |

| 7 December 2024 19 | Port Vale | 0–1 | Walsall | Burslem |
| 12:30 GMT | | Report | Matt 51' | Stadium: Vale Park; Attendance: 9,142; Referee: Ben Speedie; Assistant referees: Emily Carney, Marc Wilson; Fourth official: Declan Brown |
Note: Fixture was initially scheduled for a 15:00 kick-off but was moved for live Sky Sports broadcast.

| 14 December 2024 20 | Bromley | 0–0 | Port Vale | Bromley |
| 15:00 GMT | | Report | | Stadium: Hayes Lane; Attendance: 3,697; Referee: Jacob Miles; Assistant referees: Shaun Hudson, Hugh Gilroy; Fourth official: Nigel Lugg |

| 21 December 2024 21 | Port Vale | 0–0 | Carlisle United | Burslem |
| 15:00 GMT | | Report | | Stadium: Vale Park; Attendance: 6,920; Referee: Edward Duckworth; Assistant referees: Jacob Lehane, Kevin Morris; Fourth official: Richard Wigglesworth |

| 26 December 2024 22 | Bradford City | 2–1 | Port Vale | Bradford |
| 15:00 GMT | Cook 3', 59' | Report | Hackford 50' | Stadium: Valley Parade; Attendance: 18,330; Referee: Matthew Corlett; Assistant referees: Paul Newhouse, Matthew Bacon; Fourth official: Matthew Parry |

| 29 December 2024 23 | Grimsby Town | 3–0 | Port Vale | Cleethorpes |
| 15:00 GMT | McJannet 29'; Tharme 81'; Svanþórsson 90+2' | Report | | Stadium: Blundell Park; Attendance: 7,045; Referee: Scott Jackson; Assistant referees: William Cavanagh, Samuel Clayton; Fourth official: Wayne Grunnill |

| 1 January 2025 24 | Port Vale | 0–0 | Cheltenham Town | Burslem |
| 15:00 GMT | | Report | | Stadium: Vale Park; Attendance: 5,873; Referee: James Bell; Assistant referees: Oliver Spender, Matthew Archibald; Fourth official: Daniel Smith |

| 4 January 2025 25 | Doncaster Rovers | 1–2 | Port Vale | Doncaster |
| 15:00 GMT | Sterry 84' | Report | Croasdale 33'; Tolaj 61' | Stadium: Eco-Power Stadium; Attendance: 8,438; Referee: Jeremy Simpson; Assistant referees: Mark Dwyer, Richard Woodward; Fourth official: Alex Gray |

| 18 January 2025 27 | Port Vale | 3–2 | Newport County | Burslem |
| 15:00 GMT | Garrity 29'; Stockley 62'; Headley 77' | Report | Kamwa 12'; Evans 33' | Stadium: Vale Park; Attendance: 6,354; Referee: Stephen Parkinson; Assistant referees: Conall Bartlett, Steven Plane; Fourth official: Curtis Wood |

| 25 January 2025 28 | Chesterfield | 1–1 | Port Vale | Chesterfield |
| 15:00 GMT | Dobra 76' | Report | Stockley 2' | Stadium: SMH Group Stadium; Attendance: 9,077; Referee: Andrew Humphries; Assistant referees: Darren Wilding, Daniel Robinson; Fourth official: Oliver Bickle |

| 1 February 2025 30 | Port Vale | 2–1 | Accrington Stanley | Burslem |
| 15:00 GMT | Stockley 7'; Tolaj 56' | Report | Walton 51' | Stadium: Vale Park; Attendance: 6,198; Referee: Adam Herczeg; Assistant referees: Scott Chalkley, Grant Taylor; Fourth official: Kevin Morris |

| 8 February 2025 31 | Swindon Town | 3–3 | Port Vale | Swindon |
| 12:30 GMT | Wright 20' (pen.); Butterworth 45'; Cotterill 63' | Report | Headley 31'; Tolaj 40', 87' | Stadium: County Ground; Attendance: 7,606; Referee: Declan Bourne; Assistant referees: David Nicholson, Mark Senior; Fourth official: Paul Howard |
Note: Switched to an earlier kick-off time to be shown live by Sky Sports.

| 13 February 2025 32 | Port Vale | 1–0 | Notts County | Burslem |
| 20:00 GMT | Curtis 85' | Report | | Stadium: Vale Park; Attendance: 7,213; Referee: Ruebyn Ricardo; Assistant referees: Daniel Jarvis, Jacob Lehane; Fourth official: Will Finnie |
Note: Switched to an earlier kick-off time to be shown live by Sky Sports.

| 22 February 2025 33 | Port Vale | 2–1 | Salford City | Burslem |
| 15:00 GMT | Hackford 43'; Harper 52' | Report | Adelakun 77' (pen.) | Stadium: Vale Park; Attendance: 6,823; Referee: Thomas Kirk; Assistant referees: Mark Ryder, Dumitru-Ravel Cheosiaua; Fourth official: Declan O'Shea |

| 1 March 2025 34 | Tranmere Rovers | 1–1 | Port Vale | Birkenhead |
| 12:30 GMT | Dennis 18' | Report | Curtis 29' | Stadium: Prenton Park; Attendance: 6,974; Referee: David Rock; Assistant referees: Jacob Graham, Emmanuel Edet; Fourth official: Ben Speedie |
Note: Switched to an earlier kick-off time to be shown live by Sky Sports.

| 4 March 2025 35 | Port Vale | 0–0 | Harrogate Town | Burslem |
| 19:45 GMT | | Report | | Stadium: Vale Park; Attendance: 5,107; Referee: Sam Allison; Assistant referees: Andrew Fox, Ian Cooper; Fourth official: Daniel Guest |

| 8 March 2025 36 | Fleetwood Town | 1–1 | Port Vale | Fleetwood |
| 15:00 GMT | Graydon 81' | Report | Tolaj 90+6' (pen.) | Stadium: Highbury Stadium; Attendance: 3,501; Referee: Bobby Madley; Assistant referees: Paul Newhouse, Daniel Woodward; Fourth official: Oliver Nolan |

| 11 March 2025 29 | Colchester United | 2–1 | Port Vale | Colchester |
| 19:45 GMT | Tovide 34'; Kelleher 86' | Report | Richards 85' | Stadium: Colchester Community Stadium; Attendance: 4,055; Referee: Aaron Bannister; Assistant referees: Joseph Stokes, Stuart Butler; Fourth official: David Harrison |
Note: Fixture was originally scheduled for 28 January but was postponed due to a waterlogged pitch.

| 15 March 2025 37 | Port Vale | 3–0 | Milton Keynes Dons | Burslem |
| 15:00 GMT | Tolaj 27'; Stockley 52'; Garrity 90+8' | Report | | Stadium: Vale Park; Attendance: 6,773; Referee: Michael Barlow; Assistant referees: Jack Forder, Ollie Williams; Fourth official: Grant Taylor |

| 22 March 2025 38 | Port Vale | 1–0 | Morecambe | Burslem |
| 15:00 GMT | Curtis 89' | Report | | Stadium: Vale Park; Attendance: 7,038; Referee: Scott Oldham; Assistant referees: Thomas Cooke, Sam Wesson; Fourth official: Joseph Pettitt |

| 25 March 2025 26 | Port Vale | 0–1 | Barrow | Burslem |
| 19:30 GMT | | Report | Jackson 36' | Stadium: Vale Park; Attendance: 5,894; Referee: Zac Kennard-Kettle; Assistant referees: Emily Carney, Matthew Jones; Fourth official: Thomas Harty |
Note: Fixture was originally scheduled for 11 January but was postponed due to a frozen pitch.

| 29 March 2025 39 | Crewe Alexandra | 0–1 | Port Vale | Crewe |
| 12:30 GMT | | Report | Stockley 86' | Stadium: Gresty Road; Attendance: 8,365; Referee: Martin Coy; Assistant referees: Johnathon Bickerdike, Marvyn Amphlett; Fourth official: Dale Baines |
Note: Fixture was initially scheduled for 15:00 but was moved for live Sky Sports broadcast.

| 1 April 2025 40 | Port Vale | 2–0 | Bradford City | Burslem |
| 19:45 BST | Tolaj 11'; Clark 32' | Report | | Stadium: Vale Park; Attendance: 8,659; Referee: Ben Toner; Assistant referees: Daniel Jarvis, Richard Wigglesworth; Fourth official: Declan Ford |

| 5 April 2025 41 | Walsall | 2–3 | Port Vale | Walsall |
| 12:30 BST | Allen 7' (pen.) Amantchi 11' | Report | Tolaj 4', 45+2'; Garrity 41' | Stadium: Bescot Stadium; Attendance: 8,446; Referee: Lewis Smith; Assistant referees: Alan Cresswell, Mark Cunliffe; Fourth official: Richard Eley |
Note: Fixture was initially scheduled for a 15:00 kick-off but was moved for live Sky Sports broadcast.

| 12 April 2025 42 | Port Vale | 5–0 | Bromley | Burslem |
| 15:00 BST | Shorrock 5'; Tolaj 28', 68'; Byers 66'; Croasdale 82' | Report | | Stadium: Vale Park; Attendance: 10,864; Referee: Abigail Byrne; Assistant referees: Steven Plane, Zharir Mustafa; Fourth official: Abbas Khan |

| 18 April 2025 43 | Carlisle United | 3–2 | Port Vale | Carlisle |
| 15:00 BST | Kelly 36'; Dennis 43'; Hayden 49' | Report | Stockley 61'; Hart 70' | Stadium: Brunton Park; Attendance: 12,305; Referee: Martin Woods; Assistant referees: Paul Newhouse, Matthew Sowerby; Fourth official: Graeme Fyvie |

| 21 April 2025 44 | Port Vale | 2–2 | Grimsby Town | Burslem |
| 15:00 BST | Tolaj 78'; Debrah 90+5' | Report | Rose 24', 52' (pen.) | Stadium: Vale Park; Attendance: 11,829; Referee: Richard Eley; Assistant referees: Simon Robinson, Ceri Louise Williams; Fourth official: Emmanuel Edet |

| 26 April 2025 45 | AFC Wimbledon | 0–2 | Port Vale | Wimbledon |
| 12:30 BST | | Report | Stockley 64'; Headley 67' | Stadium: Plough Lane; Attendance: 8,664; Referee: Declan Bourne; Assistant referees: Scott Williams, Kevin Howick; Fourth official: Robert Massey-Ellis |
Note: Fixture was initially scheduled for a 15:00 kick-off but was moved for live Sky Sports broadcast.

| 3 May 2025 46 | Port Vale | 0–1 | Gillingham | Burslem |
| 15:00 BST | | Report | Rowe 56' | Stadium: Vale Park; Attendance: 13,661; Referee: Jacob Miles; Assistant referees: Daniel Woodward, Michael Webb; Fourth official: Peter Wright |

=== FA Cup ===
Win Draw Loss Fixtures

| 2 November 2024 R1 | Port Vale | 1–3 | Barnsley | Burslem |
| 15:00 GMT | Curtis 31' | Report | Roberts 17'; Keillor-Dunn 64'; Phillips 82' (pen.) | Stadium: Vale Park; Attendance: 5,128; Referee: Charles Breakspear; Assistant referees: Daniel Robinson, Adam Burgess; Fourth official: Matthew Scholes |

=== EFL Cup ===
Win Draw Loss Fixtures

| 13 August 2024 R1 | Barrow | 3–2 | Port Vale | Barrow-in-Furness |
| 19:45 BST | Garner 1'; Acquah 70'; Jackson 76' | Report | Paton 26'; Sang 66' | Stadium: Holker Street; Attendance: 1,711; Referee: Scott Jackson; Assistant referees: Conor Brown, Jonathan Wyatt; Fourth official: Andrew Miller |

=== EFL Trophy ===
| Pos | Div | Team | Pld | W | PW | PL | L | GF | GA | GD | Pts | Qualification |
|---|---|---|---|---|---|---|---|---|---|---|---|---|
| 1 | L1 | Wrexham | 3 | 2 | 0 | 1 | 0 | 6 | 2 | +4 | 7 | Advance to Round 2 |
| 2 | L2 | Port Vale | 3 | 1 | 2 | 0 | 0 | 5 | 3 | +2 | 7 | Advance to Round 2 |
| 3 | L2 | Salford City | 3 | 1 | 0 | 0 | 2 | 4 | 6 | −2 | 3 | |
| 4 | ACA | Wolverhampton Wanderers U21 | 3 | 0 | 0 | 1 | 2 | 4 | 8 | −4 | 1 | |

Source: EFL

Win Draw Loss Fixtures

| 20 August 2024 Group stage | Salford City | 0–2 | Port Vale | Kersal |
| 19:00 BST | | Report | Edwards 50'; Paton 71' | Stadium: Moor Lane; Attendance: 693; Referee: Ruebyn Ricardo; Assistant referees: Samuel Clayton, Paul Newhouse; Fourth official: Kevin Mulraine |

| 3 September 2024 Group stage | Port Vale | 2–2 (5–4 p) | Wolverhampton Wanderers U21 | Burslem |
| 19:45 BST | Tolaj 59'; Curtis 89' | Report | Edozie 26'; Holman 86' | Stadium: Vale Park; Attendance: 851; Referee: Aaron Bannister; Assistant referees: Alex Gray, Harley McKittrick; Fourth official: Richard Wigglesworth |
| | Penalties |
| | Tolaj (penalty scored); Curtis (penalty scored); Sang (penalty scored); Richards (penalty scored); Lowe (penalty missed); Plant (penalty scored) | | Barnett (penalty scored); Holman (penalty scored); Keto-Diyawa (penalty scored); Whittingham (penalty missed); Esen (penalty scored); Farmer (penalty missed) |

| 12 November 2024 Group stage | Port Vale | 1–1 (3–1 p) | Wrexham | Burslem |
| 19:45 GMT | Richards 82' | Report | Cleworth 51' | Stadium: Vale Park; Attendance: 1,837; Referee: Steven Copeland; Assistant referees: Scott Chalkley, Christopher Husband; Fourth official: Aaron Hallam |
| | Penalties |
| | Tolaj (penalty scored); Lowe (penalty scored); Grant (penalty scored); Richards (penalty missed) | | Mullin (penalty scored); Forde (penalty missed); Revan (penalty missed); Rathbone (penalty missed) |

| 10 December 2024 R2 | Doncaster Rovers | 0–1 | Port Vale | Doncaster |
| 19:00 GMT | | Report | Harper 90+2' | Stadium: Eco-Power Stadium; Attendance: 1,396; Referee: Paul Marsden; Assistant referees: Stephen Wade, Callum Gough; Fourth official: Martin Parker |

| 4 February 2025 Round of 16 | Port Vale | 1–4 | Wrexham | Burslem |
| 19:00 GMT | Curtis 1' | Report | Cannon 31'; Ashfield 48'; Lee 63'; Faal 82' | Stadium: Vale Park; Attendance: 1,621; Referee: Ben Toner; Assistant referees: Kenwyn Hughes, Ollie Williams; Fourth official: Andrew Ellis |
Note: Fixture was initially scheduled for 7 January 2025 until it was postponed due to snowfall, causing safety concerns relating to the stadium's surrounding areas.

== Squad statistics ==
=== Appearances and goals ===
Key to positions: GK – Goalkeeper; DF – Defender; MF – Midfielder; FW – Forward

| No. | Pos | Nat | Player | Total | | EFL League Two | | FA Cup | | EFL Cup | | EFL Trophy | |
| No. | Pos | Nat | Player | Apps | Goals | Apps | Goals | Apps | Goals | Apps | Goals | Apps | Goals |
|---|---|---|---|---|---|---|---|---|---|---|---|---|---|
| 2 | DF | (Wales) WAL | Mitch Clark | 22 | 1 | 20 | 1 | 0 | 0 | 0 | 0 | 2 | 0 |
| 3 | DF | (England) ENG | Dan Jones | 0 | 0 | 0 | 0 | 0 | 0 | 0 | 0 | 0 | 0 |
| 4 | DF | (England) ENG | Ben Heneghan | 30 | 0 | 25 | 0 | 1 | 0 | 0 | 0 | 4 | 0 |
| 5 | DF | (England) ENG | Connor Hall | 46 | 0 | 44 | 0 | 1 | 0 | 0 | 0 | 1 | 0 |
| 6 | DF | (England) ENG | Nathan Smith | 27 | 0 | 24 | 0 | 0 | 0 | 0 | 0 | 3 | 0 |
| 7 | MF | (Scotland) SCO | George Byers | 26 | 2 | 23 | 2 | 0 | 0 | 0 | 0 | 3 | 0 |
| 8 | MF | (England) ENG | Ben Garrity | 30 | 5 | 29 | 5 | 0 | 0 | 0 | 0 | 1 | 0 |
| 9 | FW | (England) ENG | Jayden Stockley | 41 | 11 | 38 | 11 | 1 | 0 | 0 | 0 | 2 | 0 |
| 10 | MF | (South Africa) RSA | Ethan Chislett | 28 | 4 | 25 | 4 | 0 | 0 | 0 | 0 | 3 | 0 |
| 11 | FW | (Republic of Ireland) IRL | Ronan Curtis | 46 | 8 | 42 | 5 | 1 | 1 | 0 | 0 | 3 | 2 |
| 13 | GK | (England) ENG | Ben Amos | 28 | 0 | 23 | 0 | 0 | 0 | 1 | 0 | 4 | 0 |
| 14 | MF | (Belgium) BEL | Funso Ojo | 2 | 0 | 1 | 0 | 0 | 0 | 1 | 0 | 0 | 0 |
| 16 | MF | (England) ENG | Jason Lowe | 18 | 0 | 11 | 0 | 1 | 0 | 1 | 0 | 5 | 0 |
| 17 | FW | (Republic of Ireland) IRL | Ruari Paton | 24 | 3 | 19 | 1 | 1 | 0 | 1 | 1 | 3 | 1 |
| 18 | MF | (England) ENG | Ryan Croasdale | 47 | 4 | 45 | 4 | 0 | 0 | 1 | 0 | 1 | 0 |
| 19 | FW | (Switzerland) SUI | Lorent Tolaj | 42 | 15 | 37 | 14 | 0 | 0 | 1 | 0 | 4 | 1 |
| 20 | MF | (England) ENG | Tom Sang | 32 | 1 | 28 | 0 | 1 | 0 | 1 | 1 | 2 | 0 |
| 21 | FW | (England) ENG | James Plant | 4 | 0 | 1 | 0 | 0 | 0 | 1 | 0 | 2 | 0 |
| 22 | DF | (England) ENG | Jesse Debrah | 41 | 2 | 35 | 2 | 1 | 0 | 1 | 0 | 4 | 0 |
| 23 | DF | (England) ENG | Jack Shorrock | 22 | 2 | 17 | 2 | 1 | 0 | 1 | 0 | 3 | 0 |
| 24 | DF | (England) ENG | Kyle John | 31 | 0 | 28 | 0 | 0 | 0 | 1 | 0 | 2 | 0 |
| 25 | MF | (England) ENG | Diamond Edwards | 4 | 1 | 1 | 0 | 0 | 0 | 0 | 0 | 3 | 1 |
| 26 | MF | (England) ENG | Rico Richards | 32 | 4 | 27 | 3 | 1 | 0 | 0 | 0 | 4 | 1 |
| 27 | MF | (Wales) WAL | Finn Ashworth | 0 | 0 | 0 | 0 | 0 | 0 | 0 | 0 | 0 | 0 |
| 28 | FW | (England) ENG | Andrew Buah | 1 | 0 | 0 | 0 | 0 | 0 | 1 | 0 | 0 | 0 |
| 29 | GK | (England) ENG | Arron Davies | 0 | 0 | 0 | 0 | 0 | 0 | 0 | 0 | 0 | 0 |
| 30 | DF | (England) ENG | Ben Lomax | 2 | 0 | 0 | 0 | 0 | 0 | 1 | 0 | 1 | 0 |
| 31 | DF | (England) ENG | Louis Francis | 0 | 0 | 0 | 0 | 0 | 0 | 0 | 0 | 0 | 0 |
| 32 | FW | (England) ENG | Antwoine Hackford | 29 | 4 | 24 | 4 | 1 | 0 | 0 | 0 | 4 | 0 |
| 33 | DF | (England) ENG | Jaheim Headley | 8 | 3 | 8 | 3 | 0 | 0 | 0 | 0 | 0 | 0 |
| 34 | FW | (England) ENG | Logan Cousins | 0 | 0 | 0 | 0 | 0 | 0 | 0 | 0 | 0 | 0 |
| 35 | MF | (England) ENG | Karl Agnero | 1 | 0 | 0 | 0 | 0 | 0 | 0 | 0 | 1 | 0 |
| 37 | FW | (England) ENG | Jemiah Umolu | 9 | 0 | 9 | 0 | 0 | 0 | 0 | 0 | 0 | 0 |
| 38 | MF | (England) ENG | Rhys Walters | 14 | 0 | 13 | 0 | 0 | 0 | 0 | 0 | 1 | 0 |
| 40 | GK | (England) ENG | Nathan Broome | 1 | 0 | 0 | 0 | 0 | 0 | 0 | 0 | 1 | 0 |
| 42 | DF | (England) ENG | Sam Hart | 26 | 1 | 22 | 1 | 0 | 0 | 0 | 0 | 4 | 0 |
| 45 | MF | (England) ENG | Rekeem Harper | 21 | 2 | 18 | 1 | 0 | 0 | 0 | 0 | 3 | 1 |
Players who featured but departed the club permanently during the season:
| 1 | GK | (England) ENG | Connor Ripley | 24 | 0 | 23 | 0 | 1 | 0 | 0 | 0 | 0 | 0 |
| 12 | FW | (England) ENG | Baylee Dipepa | 5 | 0 | 3 | 0 | 0 | 0 | 1 | 0 | 1 | 0 |
| 15 | MF | (England) ENG | Conor Grant | 7 | 0 | 4 | 0 | 1 | 0 | 0 | 0 | 2 | 0 |
| 27 | MF | (Jamaica) JAM | Brandon Cover | 20 | 2 | 19 | 2 | 1 | 0 | 0 | 0 | 0 | 0 |
| 37 | MF | (England) ENG | Benicio Baker-Boaitey | 14 | 0 | 10 | 0 | 1 | 0 | 1 | 0 | 2 | 0 |

=== Top scorers ===
| Place | Position | Nation | Number | Name | EFL League Two | FA Cup | EFL Cup | EFL Trophy | Total |
|---|---|---|---|---|---|---|---|---|---|
| 1 | MF | Switzerland | 19 | Lorent Tolaj | 14 | 0 | 0 | 1 | 15 |
| 2 | FW | England | 9 | Jayden Stockley | 11 | 0 | 0 | 0 | 11 |
| 3 | FW | Ireland | 11 | Ronan Curtis | 5 | 1 | 0 | 2 | 8 |
| 4 | MF | England | 8 | Ben Garrity | 5 | 0 | 0 | 0 | 5 |
| 5 | MF | England | 18 | Ryan Croasdale | 4 | 0 | 0 | 0 | 4 |
| – | MF | South Africa | 10 | Ethan Chislett | 4 | 0 | 0 | 0 | 4 |
| – | FW | England | 32 | Antwoine Hackford | 4 | 0 | 0 | 0 | 4 |
| – | FW | England | 26 | Rico Richards | 3 | 0 | 0 | 1 | 4 |
| 9 | DF | England | 33 | Jaheim Headley | 3 | 0 | 0 | 0 | 3 |
| – | FW | Ireland | 17 | Ruari Paton | 1 | 0 | 1 | 1 | 3 |
| 11 | MF | Scotland | 7 | George Byers | 2 | 0 | 0 | 0 | 2 |
| – | MF | Jamaica | 27 | Brandon Cover | 2 | 0 | 0 | 0 | 2 |
| – | DF | England | 22 | Jesse Debrah | 2 | 0 | 0 | 0 | 2 |
| – | MF | England | 45 | Rekeem Harper | 1 | 0 | 0 | 1 | 2 |
| — | DF | England | 23 | Jack Shorrock | 2 | 0 | 0 | 0 | 2 |
| 16 | DF | Wales | 2 | Mitch Clark | 1 | 0 | 0 | 0 | 1 |
| – | MF | England | 25 | Diamond Edwards | 0 | 0 | 0 | 1 | 1 |
| – | DF | England | 42 | Sam Hart | 1 | 0 | 0 | 0 | 1 |
| – | MF | England | 20 | Tom Sang | 0 | 0 | 1 | 0 | 1 |
| | | | | TOTALS | 65 | 1 | 2 | 7 | 75 |

=== Disciplinary record ===
| Number | Nation | Position | Name | EFL League Two | | FA Cup | | EFL Cup | | EFL Trophy | | Total | |
| Number | Nation | Position | Name | Yellow card | Red card | Yellow card | Red card | Yellow card | Red card | Yellow card | Red card | Yellow card | Red card |
| 20 | England | MF | Tom Sang | 2 | 2 | 0 | 0 | 0 | 0 | 0 | 0 | 2 | 2 |
| 2 | Wales | DF | Mitch Clark | 4 | 1 | 0 | 0 | 0 | 0 | 0 | 0 | 4 | 1 |
| 45 | England | MF | Rekeem Harper | 3 | 1 | 0 | 0 | 0 | 0 | 0 | 0 | 3 | 1 |
| 18 | England | MF | Ryan Croasdale | 9 | 0 | 0 | 0 | 0 | 0 | 0 | 0 | 9 | 0 |
| 22 | England | DF | Jesse Debrah | 4 | 0 | 1 | 0 | 0 | 0 | 0 | 0 | 5 | 0 |
| 24 | England | DF | Kyle John | 4 | 0 | 0 | 0 | 0 | 0 | 1 | 0 | 5 | 0 |
| 9 | England | FW | Jayden Stockley | 5 | 0 | 0 | 0 | 0 | 0 | 0 | 0 | 5 | 0 |
| 19 | Switzerland | FW | Lorent Tolaj | 5 | 0 | 0 | 0 | 0 | 0 | 0 | 0 | 5 | 0 |
| 7 | Scotland | MF | George Byers | 3 | 0 | 0 | 0 | 0 | 0 | 1 | 0 | 4 | 0 |
| 27 | Jamaica | MF | Brandon Cover | 3 | 0 | 1 | 0 | 0 | 0 | 0 | 0 | 4 | 0 |
| 11 | Ireland | FW | Ronan Curtis | 4 | 0 | 0 | 0 | 0 | 0 | 0 | 0 | 4 | 0 (Note: Ronan Curtis's red card against Salford City on 22 February was rescinded on appeal.) |
| 5 | England | DF | Connor Hall | 4 | 0 | 0 | 0 | 0 | 0 | 0 | 0 | 4 | 0 |
| 4 | England | DF | Ben Heneghan | 4 | 0 | 0 | 0 | 0 | 0 | 0 | 0 | 4 | 0 |
| 10 | South Africa | MF | Ethan Chislett | 3 | 0 | 0 | 0 | 0 | 0 | 0 | 0 | 3 | 0 |
| 8 | England | MF | Ben Garrity | 3 | 0 | 0 | 0 | 0 | 0 | 0 | 0 | 3 | 0 |
| 42 | England | DF | Sam Hart | 3 | 0 | 0 | 0 | 0 | 0 | 0 | 0 | 3 | 0 |
| 37 | England | MF | Benicio Baker-Boaitey | 2 | 0 | 0 | 0 | 0 | 0 | 0 | 0 | 2 | 0 |
| 17 | Ireland | FW | Ruari Paton | 2 | 0 | 0 | 0 | 0 | 0 | 0 | 0 | 2 | 0 |
| 23 | England | DF | Jack Shorrock | 2 | 0 | 0 | 0 | 0 | 0 | 0 | 0 | 2 | 0 |
| 6 | England | DF | Nathan Smith | 2 | 0 | 0 | 0 | 0 | 0 | 0 | 0 | 2 | 0 |
| 13 | England | GK | Ben Amos | 2 | 0 | 0 | 0 | 0 | 0 | 0 | 0 | 2 | 0 |
| 32 | England | FW | Antwoine Hackford | 1 | 0 | 0 | 0 | 0 | 0 | 0 | 0 | 1 | 0 |
| 16 | England | MF | Jason Lowe | 1 | 0 | 0 | 0 | 0 | 0 | 0 | 0 | 1 | 0 |
| 21 | England | FW | James Plant | 0 | 0 | 0 | 0 | 1 | 0 | 0 | 0 | 1 | 0 |
| 26 | England | MF | Rico Richards | 1 | 0 | 0 | 0 | 0 | 0 | 0 | 0 | 1 | 0 |
| 1 | England | GK | Connor Ripley | 1 | 0 | 0 | 0 | 0 | 0 | 0 | 0 | 1 | 0 |
| | | | TOTALS | 76 | 4 | 2 | 0 | 1 | 0 | 2 | 0 | 81 | 4 |

Sourced from Soccerway.

== Awards ==
| End of Season Awards | Winner |
|---|---|
| Player of the Year | Ryan Croasdale |
| Top Goalscorer | Lorent Tolaj |
| Apprentice of the Season | Jack Shorrock |
| PFA Community Award | Jayden Stockley |
| Community Champion | Lorent Tolaj |
| Goal of the Season | Jack Shorrock (vs Crewe Alexandra, 25 November 2024) |
| Supporter Club Player of the Season | Ryan Croasdale |
| Young Player of the Year | Kyle John |
| Players' Player of the Year | Ryan Croasdale |
| EFL Awards | Winner |
| League Two Apprentice of the Season | Jack Shorrock |
| EFL League Two Team of the Season | Connor Hall |
| National Awards | Winner |
| EFL League Two Player of the Month | Lorent Tolaj (April 2025) |

== Transfers ==
=== Transfers in ===
| Date from | Pos. | Nationality | Name | From | Fee | Ref. |
|---|---|---|---|---|---|---|
| 21 June 2024 | CF | ENG | Jayden Stockley | Fleetwood Town | Undisclosed | |
| 1 July 2024 | GK | ENG | Ben Amos | Wigan Athletic | Free transfer | |
| 1 July 2024 (Note: The transfer was announced on 17 June and would become official on 1 July once his contract at Stockport County expired) | DM | ENG | Ryan Croasdale | Stockport County | Free transfer | |
| 1 July 2024 (Note: The transfer was announced on 22 May and would become official on 1 July once his contract at AFC Wimbledon expired) | LW | IRL | Ronan Curtis | AFC Wimbledon | Free transfer | |
| 1 July 2024 | CB | ENG | Connor Hall | Colchester United | Undisclosed | |
| 1 July 2024 (Note: The transfer was announced on 26 June and would become official on 1 July once his contract at Sutton United expired) | LB | ENG | Sam Hart | Sutton United | Free transfer | |
| 1 July 2024 (Note: The transfer was announced on 28 June and would become official on 1 July) | CF | SUI | Lorent Tolaj | Aldershot Town | Undisclosed | |
| 9 July 2024 | CM | SCO | George Byers | Sheffield Wednesday | Free transfer | |
| 15 July 2024 | CF | IRL | Ruari Paton | (Scotland) Queen's Park | Undisclosed (Note: The transfer fee was reported to be a six-figure sum) | |
| 24 July 2024 | CB | ENG | Ben Heneghan | Fleetwood Town | Free transfer | |
| 9 August 2024 | RB | ENG | Kyle John | Everton | Free transfer | |
| 14 August 2024 | AM | ENG | Diamond Edwards | Southampton | Undisclosed | |
| 1 November 2024 | CM | ENG | Rekeem Harper | Burton Albion | Free transfer | |
| 2 January 2025 | LB | ENG | Jaheim Headley | Huddersfield Town | Undisclosed | |
| 10 January 2025 | CM | ENG | Rhys Walters | Free agent | Free transfer | |

=== Transfers out ===
| Date from | Pos. | Nationality | Name | To | Fee | Ref. |
|---|---|---|---|---|---|---|
| 10 July 2024 | CF | ENG | Ryan Loft | Cambridge United | Undisclosed | |
| 16 July 2024 | CB | SCO | Alex Iacovitti | (Scotland) St Mirren | Undisclosed | |
| 30 August 2024 | CF | ENG | Baylee Dipepa | Southampton | Undisclosed | |
| 3 February 2025 | CM | ENG | Conor Grant | Accrington Stanley | Mutual termination | |
| 3 February 2025 | GK | ENG | Connor Ripley | Swindon Town | Free transfer | |
| 30 June 2025 | CF | ENG | Andrew Buah | (Wales) Connah's Quay Nomads | Released | |
| 30 June 2025 | AM | RSA | Ethan Chislett | (South Africa) Kaizer Chiefs | Released | |
| 30 June 2025 | AM | ENG | Diamond Edwards | Walton & Hersham | Released | |
| 30 June 2025 | CM | ENG | Rekeem Harper | Barrow | Released | |
| 30 June 2025 | LB | ENG | Dan Jones | Spennymoor Town | Released | |
| 30 June 2025 | DM | ENG | Jason Lowe | Tranmere Rovers | Released | |
| 30 June 2025 | RB | ENG | Tom Sang | Shrewsbury Town | Released | |
| 30 June 2025 | CB | ENG | Nathan Smith | Tranmere Rovers | Released | |

=== Loaned in ===
| Date from | Position | Nationality | Name | From | Date until | Ref. |
|---|---|---|---|---|---|---|
| 7 August 2024 | LW | ENG | Benicio Baker-Boaitey | Brighton & Hove Albion | 8 January 2025 | |
| 30 August 2024 | CM | JAM | Brandon Cover | Leicester City | 22 January 2025 | |
| 30 August 2024 | AM | ENG | Rico Richards | Aston Villa | End of season | |
| 30 August 2024 | CF | ENG | Antwoine Hackford | Sheffield United | End of season | |
| 10 January 2025 | CF | ENG | Jemiah Umolu | Crystal Palace | End of season | |
| 14 January 2025 | GK | ENG | Nathan Broome | Swansea City | End of season | |
| 3 February 2025 | CM | WAL | Finn Ashworth | Wolverhampton Wanderers | End of season | |

=== Loaned out ===
| Date from | Pos. | Nationality | Name | To | Date until | Ref. |
|---|---|---|---|---|---|---|
| 30 August 2024 | CM | BEL | Funso Ojo | Shrewsbury Town | End of season | |
| 20 September 2024 | CF | ENG | Andrew Buah | Congleton Town | 19 October 2024 | |
| 20 September 2024 | LB | ENG | Dan Jones | Gateshead | End of season | |
| 27 September 2024 | RW | ENG | James Plant | Yeovil Town | 19 December 2024 | |
| 4 November 2024 | CB | ENG | Ben Lomax | Peterborough Sports | 31 January 2025 | |
| 31 December 2024 | CF | ENG | Andrew Buah | Mickleover | 31 January 2025 | |
| 4 January 2025 | CM | ENG | Liam Brazier | Stafford Rangers | End of season | |
| 14 January 2025 | CB | ENG | Louis Francis | Alvechurch | 14 February 2025 | |
| 20 January 2025 | CF | IRE | Ruari Paton | (Scotland) Dundee United | End of season | |
| 28 January 2025 | AM | ENG | Diamond Edwards | Weymouth | 25 February 2025 | |
| 3 February 2025 | RW | ENG | James Plant | Yeovil Town | 23 February 2025 | |
| 3 February 2025 | CM | ENG | Logan Cousins | Sandbach United | Unknown | |
| 1 March 2025 | CB | ENG | Louis Francis | Stafford Rangers | Unknown | |
| 15 March 2025 | AM | ENG | Diamond Edwards | Hampton & Richmond Borough | End of season | |
| 22 March 2025 | CF | ENG | Andrew Buah | Belper Town | End of season | |
| 27 March 2025 | CB | ENG | Ben Lomax | Redditch United | End of season | |
