= Ben Lomax =

English footballer (born 200?)

Personal information
- Full name: Benjamin James Lomax
- Date of birth: 26 October 2005 (age 21)
- Place of birth: Warrington, England
- Height: 1.85 m (6 ft 1 in)
- Position: Defender

Team information
- Current team: Chester

Youth career
- 2020–2023: Port Vale

Senior career*
Years	Team	Apps	(Gls)
2023–2026	Port Vale	3	(0)
2024–2025	→ Peterborough Sports (loan)	13	(0)
2025	→ Redditch United (loan)	6	(0)
2026–	Chester	2	(0)
- * Club domestic league appearances and goals as of 20:00 7 November 2026 (UTC)

Benjamin James Lomax (born 26 October 2005) is an English professional footballer who plays as a defender for National League North club Chester. Lomax began his career at Port Vale and played on loan at Peterborough Sports and Redditch United before joining Chester in August 2026.

== Career ==
=== Port Vale ===
Lomax made his first-team debut for Port Vale on 7 November 2023, in a 2–1 defeat at Wrexham in the EFL Trophy. He defended well on the right of the back three and showed composure on the ball when in position, with the manager Andy Crosby saying he "performed to an incredible level for his debut". Coach David Dunn claimed it was the best debut he had seen. Lomax made his league start on 29 December in a 3–0 win over Blackpool at Vale Park. He signed his first (two-and-a-half-year) professional contract in January 2024, earning praise from director of football David Flitcroft for his "hard work and dedication". Speaking in April, manager Darren Moore confirmed that Lomax had sustained an injury that would keep him out of action until the following season.

Lomax joined National League North club Peterborough Sports on loan in November 2024. Moore said he was doing "tremendously well" at the club after helping Peterborough to go unbeaten in four games. The loan was extended in January. On 27 March 2025, he joined Redditch United of the Southern League Premier Division Central on a month-long loan. Manager Matt Clarke said that the club was "very fortunate to have him" and that he was the best defender at Redditch. He played six games for the club. He was released by Port Vale upon the expiry of his contract.

=== Chester ===
On 7 August 2026, Lomax signed for National League North side Chester on a one-year deal with an option for a further year. He picked up a hamstring injury later on the month and was sidelined for an "extended period".

== Style of play ==
Lomax is a right-sided defender who can play as a centre-half, right-back or right-wing-back. A versatile player with good physical attributes and pace, he also possesses technical attacking skills.

== Career statistics ==
As of match played 7 October 2025

Appearances and goals by club, season and competition
Club	Season	League			FA Cup		EFL Cup		Other		Total	
Club	Season	Division	Apps	Goals	Apps	Goals	Apps	Goals	Apps	Goals	Apps	Goals
Port Vale	2023–24	EFL League One	3	0	1	0	0	0	2 (Note: Appearance(s) in the EFL Trophy)	0	6	0
Port Vale	2024–25	EFL League Two	0	0	0	0	1	0	1	0	2	0
Port Vale	2025–26	EFL League One	0	0	0	0	0	0	1	0	1	0
Port Vale	Total		3	0	1	0	1	0	4	0	9	0
Peterborough Sports (loan)	2024–25	National League North	13	0	0	0	—		2 (Note: Appearance(s) in FA Trophy)	0	15	0
Redditch United (loan)	2024–25	Southern League; Premier Division Central	6	0	—		—		—		6	0
Chester	2026–27	National League North	0	0	0	0	—		0	0	0	0
Career total			22	0	1	0	1	0	6	0	30	0
