= Dan Jones (footballer, born 1994) =

English footballer (born 1994)

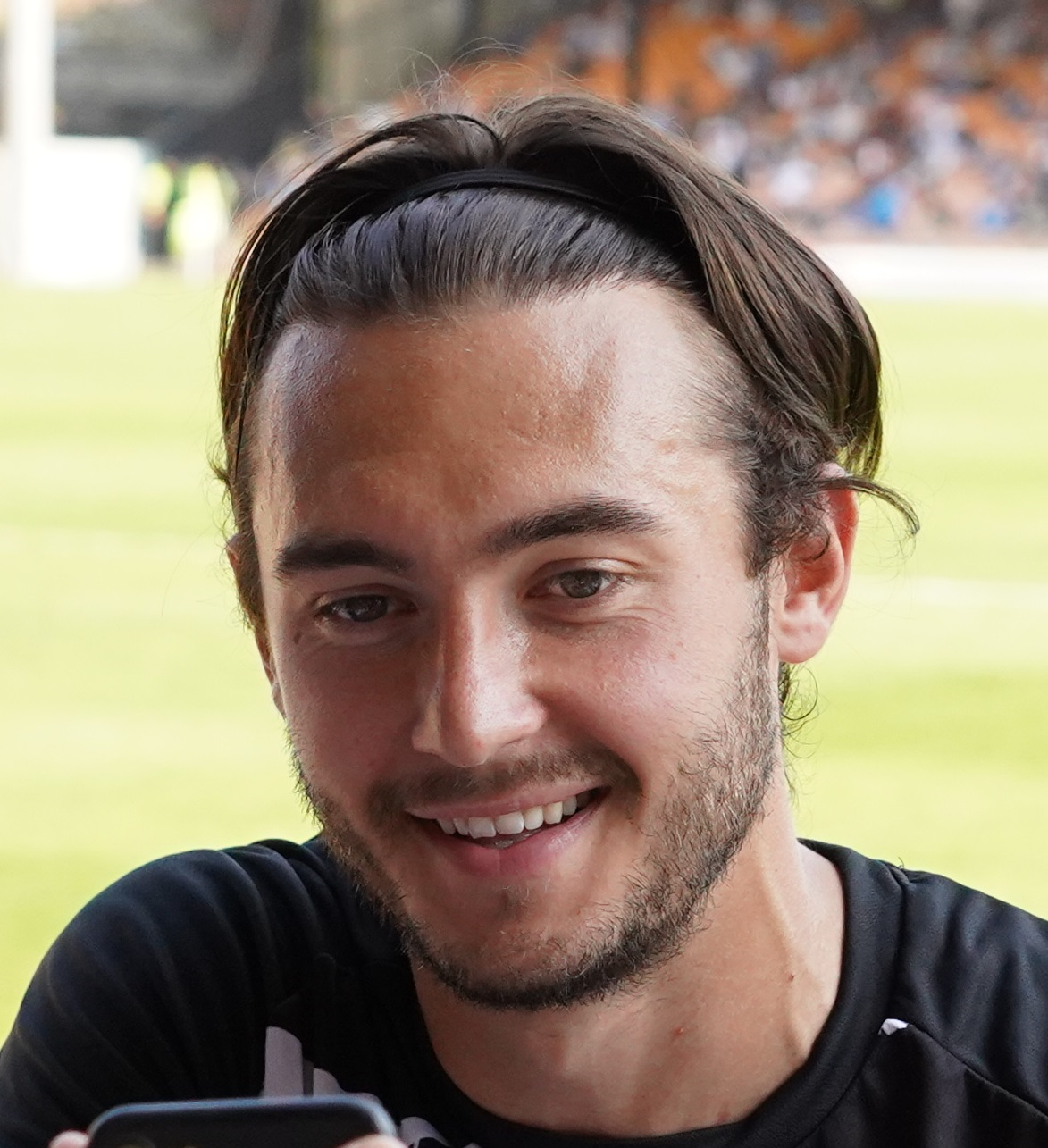
- Jones pictured in August 2022

Personal information
- Full name: Daniel John Jones
- Date of birth: 14 December 1994 (age 31)
- Place of birth: Bishop Auckland, England
- Height: 6 ft 0 in (1.83 m)
- Position: Defender

Youth career
- Sunderland
- –2013: Hartlepool United

Senior career*
| Years | Team | Apps | (Gls) |
| 2013–2016 | Hartlepool United | 37 | (0) |
| 2016–2017 | Grimsby Town | 3 | (0) |
| 2016 | → Gateshead (loan) | 3 | (0) |
| 2017 | → AFC Fylde (loan) | 5 | (0) |
| 2017–2019 | Barrow | 74 | (4) |
| 2019–2021 | Salford City | 3 | (0) |
| 2020 | → Barrow (loan) | 4 | (0) |
| 2020–2021 | → Harrogate Town (loan) | 21 | (1) |
| 2021–2025 | Port Vale | 61 | (0) |
| 2024–2025 | → Gateshead (loan) | 23 | (1) |
| 2025–2026 | Spennymoor Town | 47 | (2) |

International career
| 2018 | England C | 2 | (0) |
- * Club domestic league appearances and goals as of 20:33, 13 November 2026 (UTC)

Daniel John Jones (born 14 December 1994) is an English professional footballer who plays as a defender. His preferred position is at centre-back, though he can play at left-back and is also a skilled throw-in taker.

Jones started his career in Hartlepool United's youth system, signing his first professional contract in 2013. Having been released by the club in 2016, Jones signed for League Two club Grimsby Town, with loan spells at Gateshead and AFC Fylde during the 2016–17 season. He joined Barrow in 2017 and was a first-team regular for two seasons, winning two caps for the England C team, before he joined Salford City on a two-year contract in June 2019. He spent the second half of the 2019–20 season on loan at former club Barrow, which would end in them winning promotion as champions of the National League. He was loaned to Harrogate Town the following season and played in the 2020 FA Trophy final victory over Concord Rangers. He joined Port Vale after being released from Salford at the end of the 2020–21 season. He was loaned to his former club Gateshead for the 2024–25 season. He joined Spennymoor Town in August 2025, departing the club in November 2026.

== Club career ==
=== Hartlepool United ===
Dan Jones was born on 14 December 1994 in Bishop Auckland, County Durham. He spent four years in the academy at Sunderland, before he started his career in Hartlepool United's youth system and established himself in the youth team in the 2012–13 season. He was offered his first professional contract in April 2013. Jones's progress was hampered after a knee injury in October 2013 which saw him ruled out for two months with a meniscus tear. He made his first-team debut at Hartlepool's Victoria Park on 25 March 2014, coming on as a 65th-minute substitute in a 4–2 defeat to Mansfield Town. He signed a new contract of undisclosed length with Hartlepool two months later.

Having failed to play again under Colin Cooper's stewardship, Jones came into first-team contention during Sam Collins's caretaker spell. On 7 October 2014, he made his first start in a 2–1 home defeat to Sheffield United in the Football League Trophy. He was initially dropped to the bench by new permanent manager Paul Murray, who lasted six weeks in the role, before Jones established himself in defence following the appointment of Ronnie Moore in December. He went on to start 23 League Two games primarily as a left-sided centre-half in the 2014–15 campaign, helping United to avoid relegation out of the Football League, and signed another new contract of undisclosed length in the summer. He made 12 appearances in the 2015–16 season. On 10 May 2016, Jones was released by Hartlepool; manager Craig Hignett said that "It might be the best thing that's happened to him because Dan has got everything, but, for one reason or another, it hasn't really clicked for him".

=== Grimsby Town ===
Jones signed a one-year contract with newly-promoted League Two club Grimsby Town on 24 June 2016. According to the Grimsby Telegraph, manager Paul Hurst saw him as "one for the future upon his arrival at Blundell Park". He joined National League club Gateshead on a one-month loan on 7 October 2016. Jones featured in three league games at the Gateshead International Stadium, but "Tynesiders" boss Neil Aspin said that "if Grimsby decide to loan him out again then he will be somebody we consider". Jones instead joined National League North leaders AFC Fylde on a one-month loan, starting on 10 February 2017. Dave Challinor, manager of the "Coasters", tried to extend the loan to keep Jones at Mill Farm, but his request was denied by Grimsby. However, Bignot was sacked three weeks later and, having made five appearances for Grimsby in the 2016–17 season, Jones was released by new manager Russell Slade in May 2017.

=== Barrow ===
On 22 June 2017, Jones signed a one-year contract, with the option of another year, at National League club Barrow. Speaking six days later, manager Paul Cox said that he had missed out on a number of other targets and that the transfer market was "the hardest in a number of years". Jones scored his first career goal on his Barrow debut in a 2–1 defeat away to Dagenham & Redbridge on 5 August. It proved to be a difficult campaign however, with Cox leaving the club in August, and his replacement – Micky Moore – was sacked after three months despite being publicly backed in the media by Jones. Jones missed a month of action with a knee injury, but the North-West Evening Mail reported that he had impressed new manager Adrian Pennock with his work rate on the sidelines. He ended the 2017–18 season with three goals in 35 appearances as the Barrow finished one points above the relegation zone. The following season Jones was named in the National League Team of the Year for the 2018–19 season despite Barrow finishing in tenth-place.

=== Salford City ===
On 5 June 2019, Jones joined newly promoted League Two club Salford City on a two-year contract. However, he struggled to break into Graham Alexander's first-team plans, with Ibou Touray preferred at left-back, and was limited to three league games. On 10 February 2020, he rejoined Barrow on loan until the end of the 2019–20 season. Barrow manager Ian Evatt stated that Jones would provide fresh competition for a team aiming to win the league and that he would provide cover for the centre-back position with Josh Granite out injured. He was limited to four appearances during his second spell at Holker Street however, as due to the COVID-19 pandemic in England the season was curtailed on 16 March, and Barrow were promoted as league winners on a points-per-game basis.

He joined fellow League Two side Harrogate Town on a season-long loan in September 2020. He scored his first goal for Harrogate in an EFL Trophy tie against Leicester City U21s on 6 October. However, he missed three months after picking up a groin injury in training towards the end of November. He scored his first Football League goal on 13 April, in a 2–2 draw with Leyton Orient at Wetherby Road, and was praised by manager Simon Weaver after the game. He played for Harrogate at Wembley Stadium in the 2020 FA Trophy final, which had been delayed from the previous season due to the pandemic; Harrogate won the game 1–0, though Jones was substituted on 62 minutes after being shown a yellow card. Jones did not play a first-team game for Salford during the 2020–21 season and left Moor Lane after not being offered a new contract by new manager Gary Bowyer.

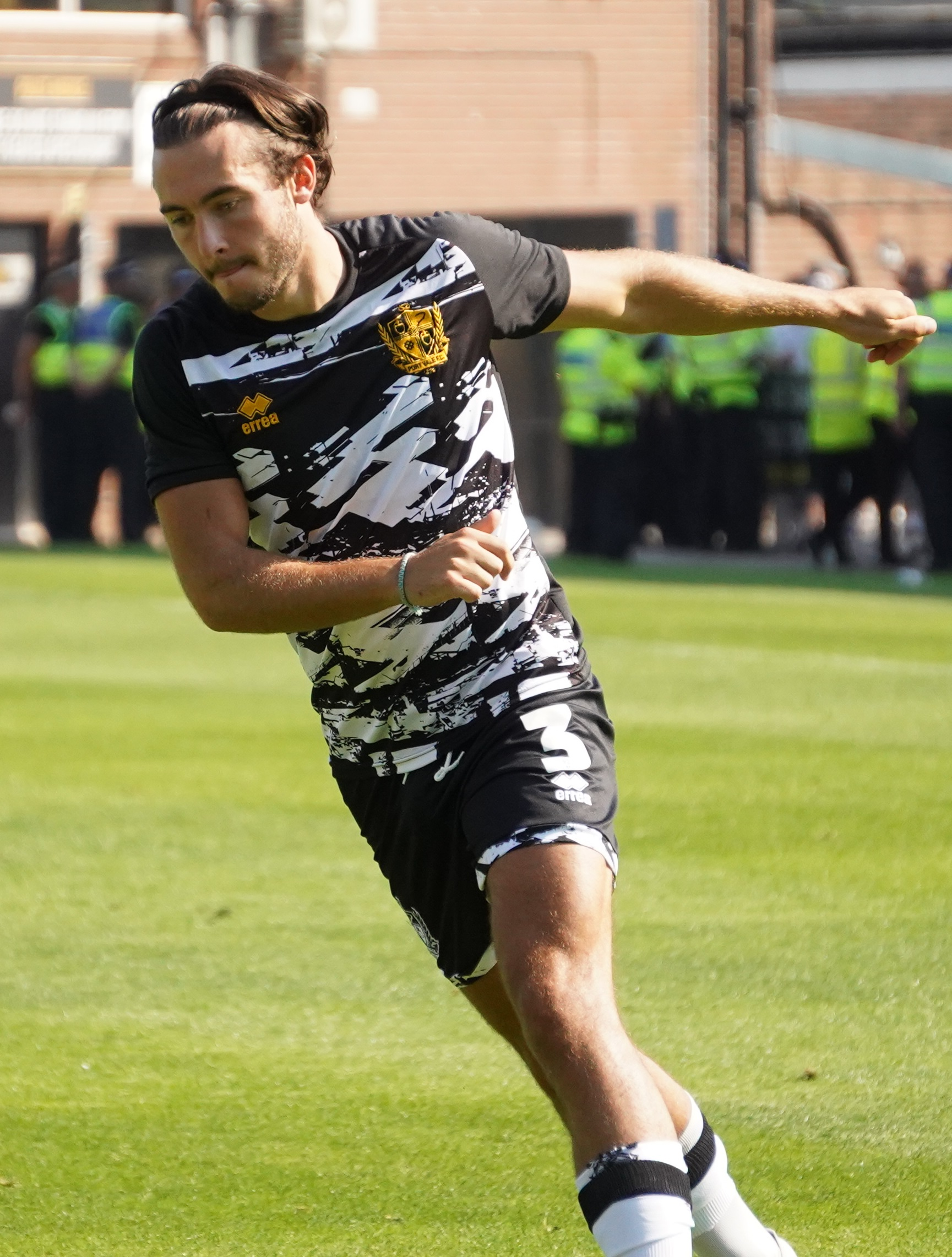
Jones playing for Port Vale (August 2022)

=== Port Vale ===
On 10 June 2021, he reached an agreement to join League Two club Port Vale on a two-year contract, with the manager Darrell Clarke commenting that "I've always liked Dan to be honest ... he'll give us options in a number of positions defensively". He played at left-back, right-back and centre-back in the opening three games of the 2021–22 season. He played the first 21 league games of the season before being suspended for three games after picking up a straight red card for a foul on Oli Cooper in a 2–1 defeat at Newport County on 11 December. He was then sidelined with a hamstring injury he picked up in training and featured for just 27 minutes in the second half of the campaign as the team secured promotion out of the play-offs.

Jones made his first league start of 2022 and his first-ever game at League One level in September, having rebuilt his fitness during the 2022–23 pre-season. He replaced Connor Hall at centre-back follow a loss in form for Hall, though Jones dropped back to the bench the following month. He played across the back five as the season progressed, winning the supporters' Player of the Match award playing in the centre of the back three in a 1–0 home win over Charlton Athletic on 19 November. He went on to be named as the club's Player of the Month in a fan vote. He picked up an ankle injury in February, which required surgery and saw him sidelined for the rest of the campaign. Clarke praised Jones for his 30 appearances throughout the season, saying he had been a "model of consistency". Jones signed a new two-year deal in May 2023; David Flitcroft, the club's director of football, said that "all his stats and data are on an upward trajectory... he is one of the top performers physically". Jones stated that new manager Andy Crosby's accessibility and knowledge were key factors in his decision to sign a new deal.

Jones was absent for much of the start of the 2023–24 season after suffering with illness and issues with his glutes. He then was further sidelined with an ankle injury. He also missed the start of the 2024–25 season due to injury. On 20 September, he rejoined National League club Gateshead on loan until 3 January. The loan was then extended until the end of the season. Port Vale released him upon the expiry of his contract at the end of the season.

=== Spennymoor Town ===
On 4 August 2025, Jones signed for National League North side Spennymoor Town. He was nominated for the National League North Player of the Month award after helping his new team to keep four clean sheets in August. He played 36 league games in the 2025–26 season, scoring two goals and being sent off once. He signed a new one year-contract with the Moors in May 2026. Jones left Spennymoor by mutual consent in November 2026.

== International career ==
Jones was called up to an England C training camp in September 2017. He made his debut on 20 March 2018 when starting a 3–2 away win over Wales in a friendly. On 20 March 2019, Jones played in the reverse fixture for England, which ended in a 2–2 draw.

== Style of play ==
Jones is a defender who plays primarily at centre-back, though can play at left-back. He can play out from the back and make diagonal passes to switch the play by passing the ball into a different zone of the pitch. He is also an accomplished throw-in taker, having been a javelin thrower at school.

== Personal life ==
His son, Theo John Jones, was born to his partner, Scarlett, in December 2022.

== Career statistics ==
As of match played 27 October 2026

Appearances and goals by club, season and competition
| Club | Season | League | | | FA Cup | | League Cup | | Other | | Total | |
| Club | Season | Division | Apps | Goals | Apps | Goals | Apps | Goals | Apps | Goals | Apps | Goals |
|---|---|---|---|---|---|---|---|---|---|---|---|---|
| Hartlepool United | 2013–14 | League Two | 1 | 0 | 0 | 0 | 0 | 0 | 0 | 0 | 1 | 0 |
| Hartlepool United | 2014–15 | League Two | 25 | 0 | 2 | 0 | 0 | 0 | 1 (Note: Appearance(s) in Football League Trophy / EFL Trophy) | 0 | 28 | 0 |
| Hartlepool United | 2015–16 | League Two | 11 | 0 | 0 | 0 | 0 | 0 | 1 | 0 | 12 | 0 |
| Hartlepool United | Total | | 37 | 0 | 2 | 0 | 0 | 0 | 2 | 0 | 41 | 0 |
| Grimsby Town | 2016–17 | League Two | 3 | 0 | 0 | 0 | 0 | 0 | 2 | 0 | 5 | 0 |
| Gateshead (loan) | 2016–17 | National League | 3 | 0 | 2 | 0 | — | | 0 | 0 | 5 | 0 |
| AFC Fylde (loan) | 2016–17 | National League North | 5 | 0 | 0 | 0 | — | | 0 | 0 | 5 | 0 |
| Barrow | 2017–18 | National League | 33 | 3 | 0 | 0 | — | | 2 (Note: Appearance(s) in FA Trophy) | 0 | 35 | 3 |
| Barrow | 2018–19 | National League | 41 | 1 | 1 | 0 | — | | 1 | 0 | 43 | 1 |
| Barrow | Total | | 74 | 4 | 1 | 0 | 0 | 0 | 3 | 0 | 78 | 4 |
| Salford City | 2019–20 | League Two | 3 | 0 | 0 | 0 | 0 | 0 | 3 | 0 | 6 | 0 |
| Salford City | 2020–21 | League Two | 0 | 0 | 0 | 0 | 0 | 0 | 0 | 0 | 0 | 0 |
| Salford City | Total | | 3 | 0 | 0 | 0 | 0 | 0 | 3 | 0 | 6 | 0 |
| Barrow (loan) | 2019–20 | National League | 4 | 0 | 0 | 0 | — | | 0 | 0 | 4 | 0 |
| Harrogate Town (loan) | 2019–20 (Note: The 2019–20 FA Trophy was delayed due to the COVID-19 pandemic, causing Harrogate to play it in during the 2020–21 season, the match counting as an appearance in the 2019–20 season) | — | — | | — | | — | | 1 | 0 | 1 | 0 |
| Harrogate Town (loan) | 2020–21 | League Two | 21 | 1 | 1 | 0 | 1 | 0 | 2 | 1 | 25 | 2 |
| Port Vale | 2021–22 | League Two | 22 | 0 | 2 | 0 | 1 | 0 | 1 | 0 | 26 | 0 |
| Port Vale | 2022–23 | League One | 25 | 0 | 1 | 0 | 1 | 0 | 3 | 0 | 30 | 0 |
| Port Vale | 2023–24 | League One | 14 | 0 | 0 | 0 | 1 | 0 | 0 | 0 | 15 | 0 |
| Port Vale | 2024–25 | League Two | 0 | 0 | 0 | 0 | 0 | 0 | 0 | 0 | 0 | 0 |
| Port Vale | Total | | 61 | 0 | 3 | 0 | 3 | 0 | 4 | 0 | 71 | 0 |
| Gateshead (loan) | 2024–25 | National League | 23 | 1 | 0 | 0 | — | | 6 (Note: 4 appearances in National League Cup and 2 appearances in the FA Trophy) | 0 | 29 | 1 |
| Spennymoor Town | 2025–26 | National League North | 36 | 2 | 3 | 0 | — | | 0 | 0 | 39 | 2 |
| Spennymoor Town | 2026–27 | National League North | 11 | 0 | 1 | 0 | — | | 0 | 0 | 12 | 0 |
| Spennymoor Town | Total | | 47 | 2 | 4 | 0 | 0 | 0 | 0 | 0 | 51 | 2 |
| Career total | | | 281 | 8 | 13 | 0 | 4 | 0 | 23 | 1 | 321 | 9 |

== Honours ==
Barrow

- National League: 2019–20

Harrogate Town

- FA Trophy: 2019–20

Individual

- National League Team of the Year: 2018–19
