= Anthony Tomlinson =

English boxer

Anthony Tomlinson is an English professional boxer, and the brother of footballer Antwoine Hackford.
