= 2025–26 Tranmere Rovers F.C. season =

142nd season in existence of Tranmere Rovers FC

Tranmere Rovers
2025–26 season
- Owner: Mark and Nicola Palios
- Chairman: Mark Palios
- Manager: Andy Crosby (until 4 March); Pete Wild (from 10 March)
- Stadium: Prenton Park
- League Two: 21st
- FA Cup: First Round
- EFL Cup: First Round
- EFL Trophy: Round of 32
- Highest home attendance: 11,141 (2 May 2026 vs. Grimsby Town)
- Lowest home attendance: 5,585 (17 February 2026 vs. Accrington Stanley)
- Biggest win: 4-0 (9 August 2025 vs. Shrewsbury Town)
- Biggest defeat: 0-5 (21 February 2026 vs. Notts County)

The 2025–26 season is the 142nd season in the history of Tranmere Rovers Football Club and their sixth consecutive season in League Two. In addition to the domestic league, the club would also participate in the FA Cup, the EFL Cup, and the EFL Trophy.

== Managerial changes ==
Prior to the season starting, Andy Crosby was appointed manager after acting as interim manager for the latter parts of the 2024–25 season. However, on 4 March 2026, Andy was dismissed from his duties at the club, with Andy Parkinson taking charge on an interim basis. Six days later, Pete Wild was appointed as manager until the end of the season.

== Current squad ==
As of 22 July 2025

| No. | Name | Position | Nationality | Place of birth | Date of birth (Age) | Previous club | Date signed | Fee | Contract end |
Goalkeepers
| 1 | Luke McGee | GK | (England) | Edgware | 2 September 1995 (age 31) | Forest Green Rovers | 1 July 2023 | Free | 30 June 2027 |
| 13 | Joe Murphy | GK | (Republic of Ireland) | Dublin | 21 August 1981 (age 45) | Shrewsbury Town | 22 August 2020 | Free | 30 June 2026 |
Defenders
| 2 | Cameron Norman | RB | (England) | Norwich | 12 October 1995 (age 31) | Milton Keynes Dons | 1 July 2024 | Free | 30 June 2026 |
| 3 | Patrick Brough | LB | (England) | Carlisle | 20 February 1996 (age 30) | Northampton Town | 1 July 2025 | Free | 30 June 2027 |
| 4 | Jordan Turnbull | CB | (England) | Trowbridge | 30 October 1994 (age 32) | Salford City | 26 July 2022 | Free | 30 June 2027 |
| 5 | Nathan Smith | CB | (England) | Madeley | 3 April 1996 (age 30) | Port Vale | 1 July 2025 | Free | 30 June 2027 |
| 22 | Lee O'Connor | CB | (Republic of Ireland) | Waterford | 28 July 2000 (age 26) | Celtic | 25 January 2022 | Undisclosed | 30 June 2027 |
| 23 | Ethan Bristow | LB | (Saint Kitts and Nevis) | Maidenhead | 27 November 2001 (age 24) | Unattached | 1 July 2025 | Free | 30 June 2026 |
Midfielders
| 6 | Richard Smallwood | DM | (England) | Redcar | 29 December 1990 (age 35) | Bradford City | 14 July 2025 | Free | 30 June 2026 |
| 7 | Charlie Whitaker | AM | (England) | Leeds | 16 September 2003 (age 23) | Notts County | 1 July 2025 | Free | 30 June 2027 |
| 8 | Sam Finley | CM | (England) | Liverpool | 4 August 1992 (age 34) | Bristol Rovers | 1 July 2024 | Free | 30 June 2026 |
| 11 | Omari Patrick | LM | (England) | Slough | 24 May 1996 (age 30) | Sutton United | 2 August 2024 | Free | 30 June 2026 |
| 16 | Jason Lowe | CM | (England) | Wigan | 2 September 1991 (age 35) | Port Vale | 1 July 2025 | Free | 30 June 2026 |
| 21 | Josh Williams | CM | (Wales) | | 13 July 2004 (age 22) | Connah's Quay Nomads | 1 July 2024 | Free | 30 June 2026 |
| 24 | Billy Blacker | AM | (England) | Calderdale | 25 May 2006 (age 20) | Sheffield United | 22 July 2025 | Loan | 31 May 2026 |
| 42 | Nohan Kenneh | DM | (Liberia) | Zwerdu | 10 January 2003 (age 23) | Hibernian | 2 July 2025 | Free | 30 June 2027 |
Forwards
| 9 | Kristian Dennis | CF | (England) | Manchester | 12 March 1990 (age 36) | Carlisle United | 1 July 2023 | Free | 30 June 2025 |
| 10 | Josh Davison | CF | (England) | Enfield | 26 September 1999 (age 27) | AFC Wimbledon | 1 July 2024 | Undisclosed | 30 June 2026 |
| 17 | Sol Solomon | CF | (Jersey) | Jersey | 17 March 2001 (age 25) | Marine | 1 July 2024 | Free | 30 June 2026 |
| 18 | Connor Jennings | CF | (England) | Manchester | 29 October 1991 (age 35) | Hartlepool United | 1 July 2023 | Free | 30 June 2025 |
| 19 | Harvey Saunders | CF | (England) | Wolverhampton | 20 July 1997 (age 29) | Bristol Rovers | 27 January 2023 | Undisclosed | 30 June 2024 |
| 20 | Samuel Taylor | RW | (England) | | 23 December 2003 (age 22) | Academy | 10 January 2022 | Trainee | 30 June 2026 |

== Transfers and contracts ==
=== In ===
| Date | Pos. | Player | From | Fee | Ref. |
|---|---|---|---|---|---|
| 3 June 2025 | LB | (Saint Kitts and Nevis) Ethan Bristow | Free agent | —N/a | |
| 1 July 2025 (Note: The transfer was announced on 6 June, and would become official on 1 July once his contract at Northampton had ended) | LB | (England) Patrick Brough | (England) Northampton Town | Free | |
| 1 July 2025 (Note: The transfer was announced on 23 May, and would become official on 1 July once his contract at Port Vale had ended) | CB | (England) Nathan Smith | (England) Port Vale | Free | |
| 1 July 2025 (Note: The transfer was announced on 23 June, and would become official on 1 July once his contract at Notts County had ended) | CAM | (England) Charlie Whitaker | (England) Notts County | Free | |
| 1 July 2025 | CM | (England) Jason Lowe | (England) Port Vale | Free | |
| 2 July 2025 | CDM | (Liberia) Nohan Kenneh | (Scotland) Hibernian | Free | |
| 14 July 2025 | CDM | (England) Richard Smallwood | (England) Bradford City | Free | |
| 1 September 2025 | ST | (England) Joe Ironside | (England) Doncaster Rovers | Undisclosed | |
| 10 October 2025 | CB | (England) Aaron McGowan | (England) Northampton Town | Free | |
| 28 January 2026 | LWB | (England) James Plant | (England) Port Vale | Undisclosed | |
| 1 February 2026 | CM | (England) Lewis Warrington | (England) Walsall | Free | |
| 20 March 2026 | W | (England) Kaiyne Woolery | (Cyprus) Anorthosis Famagusta | Free | |
| 26 March 2026 | DM | (England) Ryan Watson | (England) Salford City | Free | |

=== Out ===
| Date | Pos. | Player | To | Fee | Ref. |

=== Loaned in ===
| Date | Pos. | Player | From | Date until | Ref. |
|---|---|---|---|---|---|
| 21 July 2025 | CM | (England) Billy Blacker | (England) Sheffield United | 31 May 2026 | |
| 23 July 2025 | CF | (England) Taylan Harris | (England) Luton Town | 6 January 2026 | |
| 19 August 2025 | RB | (England) Jayden Joseph | (England) Leicester City | 31 May 2026 (Note: On 1 January, Joseph's loan from Leicester was extended until the end of the season) | |
| 1 September 2025 | GK | (England) Jack Barrett | (England) Blackburn Rovers | 31 May 2026 (Note: On 2 January, Barrett's loan from Blackburn was extended until the end of the season) | |
| 15 January 2026 | CF | (England) Dylan Jones | (England) Norwich City | 31 May 2026 | |
| 16 January 2026 | CB | (England) William Tamen | (England) Everton | 31 May 2026 | |
| 2 February 2026 | CM | (Kenya) Zech Obiero | (England) Leyton Orient | 31 May 2026 | |
| 2 February 2026 | CF | (England) Max Dickov | (England) Mansfield Town | 31 May 2026 | |
| 2 February 2026 | CB | (Moldova) Stephan Negru | (England) Oxford United | 31 May 2026 | |
| 6 February 2026 | GK | (Slovakia) Marko Maroši | (England) Port Vale | Unknown | |

=== Loaned out ===
| Date | Pos. | Player | To | Date until | Ref. |
|---|---|---|---|---|---|
| 15 August 2025 | CF | (England) Sam Taylor | (Northern Ireland) Linfield | 31 May 2026 | |
| 29 August 2025 | CF | (England) Harvey Saunders | (England) Eastleigh | 31 May 2026 | |
| 27 January 2026 | CF | (England) Josh Davison | (England) Cheltenham Town | 31 May 2026 | |
| 2 February 2026 | DM | (England) Richard Smallwood | (England) Bristol Rovers | 31 May 2026 | |

=== Released / out of contract ===
| Date | Pos. | Player | Subsequent club | Joined date | Ref. |
|---|---|---|---|---|---|
| 30 June 2025 | LM | (England) Josh Hawkes | (England) Oldham Athletic | 1 July 2025 | |
| 30 June 2025 | CM | (Scotland) Regan Hendry | (England) Mansfield Town | 1 July 2025 | |
| 30 June 2025 | RM | (England) Kieron Morris | (England) Oldham Athletic | 1 July 2025 | |
| 30 June 2025 | CM | (England) Brad Walker | (England) Hartlepool United | 1 July 2025 | |
| 30 June 2025 | CM | (England) Chris Merrie | (England) AFC Fylde | 23 July 2025 | |
| 30 June 2025 | CF | (England) Luke Norris | (England) Boreham Wood | 24 July 2025 | |
| 30 June 2025 | CB | (England) Tom Davies | (England) Salisbury | 25 July 2025 | |
| 30 June 2025 | GK | (Republic of Ireland) Reuben Egan | (Wales) Wrexham | 3 September 2025 | |
| 30 June 2025 | CB | (England) Declan Drysdale | (England) Marine | 26 September 2025 | |
| 30 June 2025 | LB | (England) Connor Wood | (England) Peterborough Sports | 18 October 2025 | |

=== New Contract ===
| Date | Pos. | Player | Expiry | Ref. |
|---|---|---|---|---|
| 15 May 2025 | GK | (England) Luke McGee | 30 June 2027 | |
| 16 May 2025 | GK | (Republic of Ireland) Joe Murphy | 30 June 2026 | |
| 16 May 2025 | ST | (England) Kristian Dennis | 30 June 2026 | |
| 23 May 2025 | RB | (Republic of Ireland) Lee O’Connor | 30 June 2027 | |
| 2 June 2025 | CB | (England) Jordan Turnbull | 30 June 2027 | |
| 26 August 2025 | CM | (Wales) Josh Williams | 30 June 2027 | |
| 6 January 2026 | CB | (England) Aaron McGowan | 30 June 2026 | |
| 29 January 2026 | CF | (England) Connor Jennings | 30 June 2027 | |

== Pre-season and friendlies ==
On 4 June, Tranmere Rovers announced their first pre-season fixture, against Wigan Athletic.

Win Draw Loss Fixtures

| 5 July 2025 Friendly | Bolton Wanderers | 1–1 | Tranmere Rovers | Lostock |
| 15:00 BST | McAtee 12' | Report | Davison 85' | Stadium: Eddie Davies Academy; Attendance: 0 (behind closed doors) |

| 12 July 2025 Friendly | Tranmere Rovers | 6–0 | Southport | Wallasey |
| 13:00 BST | Whitaker (x2); Davison; Taylor; Jennings (x2) | Report | | Stadium: Solar Campus; Attendance: 0 (behind-closed-doors) |
Note: 2x90 minute matches

| 15 July 2025 Friendly | Tranmere Rovers | 9–0 | Bootle | Wallasey |
| 19:00 BST | Whitaker (x3); Davison (x3); Norman; Taylor; Jennings | Report | | Stadium: Solar Campus; Attendance: 0 (behind-closed-doors) |

| 19 July 2025 Friendly | Blackburn Rovers U21 | 1–3 | Tranmere Rovers | Langho |
| 15:00 BST | | Report | Jennings (x2); Solomon | Stadium: Brockhall Village; Attendance: 0 (behind-closed-doors) |

| 22 July 2025 Friendly | Preston North End | 0–2 | Tranmere Rovers | Euxton |
| 15:00 BST | | Report | Davison; Patrick | Stadium: Preston North End Training Ground; Attendance: 0 (behind closed doors) |

| 26 July 2025 Friendly | Tranmere Rovers | 0–1 | Wigan Athletic | Birkenhead |
| 15:00 BST | | Report | Carragher 17' | Stadium: Prenton Park |

== Competitions ==
=== League Two ===
==== League table ====
| Pos | Team | Pld | W | D | L | GF | GA | GD | Pts | Promotion, qualification or relegation |
|---|---|---|---|---|---|---|---|---|---|---|
| 19 | Shrewsbury Town | 46 | 13 | 10 | 23 | 42 | 69 | −27 | 49 | |
| 20 | Newport County | 46 | 12 | 7 | 27 | 48 | 77 | −29 | 43 | |
| 21 | Tranmere Rovers | 46 | 10 | 11 | 25 | 54 | 79 | −25 | 41 | |
| 22 | Crawley Town | 46 | 8 | 16 | 22 | 44 | 68 | −24 | 40 | |
| 23 | Harrogate Town (R) | 46 | 10 | 9 | 27 | 39 | 68 | −29 | 39 | Relegation to National League |

Source: EFL Official Website
Rules for classification: 1) Points; 2) Goal difference; 3) Number of goals scored; 4) Head-to-head results; 5) Wins; 6) Away goals; 7) Penalty points (sec 9.5); 8) 12-point sending off offences
(R) Relegated

==== Results summary ====
| Overall | | | | | | | | Home | | | | | | Away | | | | | |
| Pld | W | D | L | GF | GA | GD | Pts | W | D | L | GF | GA | GD | W | D | L | GF | GA | GD |
|---|---|---|---|---|---|---|---|---|---|---|---|---|---|---|---|---|---|---|---|
| 46 | 10 | 11 | 25 | 54 | 79 | −25 | 41 | 4 | 6 | 13 | 22 | 37 | −15 | 6 | 5 | 12 | 32 | 42 | −10 |

Last updated: complete.
Source: Soccerway

==== Results by round ====
| Round | 1 | 2 | 3 | 5 | 6 | 7 | 8 | 9 | 10 | 11 | 12 | 13 | 14 | 4^{1} | 15 | 16 | 17 | 18 | 19 | 20 | 21 | 22 | 23 | 24 | 26 | 27 | 28 | 29 | 30 | 31 | 32 | 33 | 34 | 35 | 25^{2} | 36 | 37 | 38 | 39 | 41 | 42 | 43 | 44 | 40^{3} | 45 | 46 |
|---|---|---|---|---|---|---|---|---|---|---|---|---|---|---|---|---|---|---|---|---|---|---|---|---|---|---|---|---|---|---|---|---|---|---|---|---|---|---|---|---|---|---|---|---|---|---|
| Ground | A | H | H | A | H | A | H | A | H | A | H | A | H | A | A | H | H | A | A | H | A | H | H | A | H | H | A | A | H | A | H | H | A | A | A | H | A | H | H | A | H | A | H | A | A | H |
| Result | D | W | D | W | L | L | D | L | D | D | L | W | D | D | L | W | D | W | W | L | L | W | L | W | L | L | L | L | L | L | W | L | L | L | L | L | D | L | L | L | L | D | L | W | L | D |
| Position | 13 | 4 | 9 | 10 | 12 | 14 | 16 | 17 | 18 | 18 | 19 | 18 | 18 | 17 | 18 | 16 | 16 | 15 | 15 | 15 | 16 | 14 | 17 | 17 | 17 | 17 | 17 | 17 | 17 | 17 | 17 | 17 | 17 | 19 | 19 | 19 | 20 | 20 | 20 | 21 | 21 | 20 | 21 | 21 | 20 | 21 |
| Points | 1 | 4 | 5 | 8 | 8 | 8 | 9 | 9 | 10 | 11 | 11 | 14 | 15 | 16 | 16 | 19 | 20 | 23 | 26 | 26 | 26 | 29 | 29 | 32 | 32 | 32 | 32 | 32 | 32 | 32 | 35 | 35 | 35 | 35 | 35 | 35 | 36 | 36 | 36 | 36 | 36 | 37 | 37 | 40 | 40 | 41 |

Source: EFL
A = Away; H = Home; W = Win; D = Draw; L = Loss; P = Postponed
Notes:
- ^{1} Matchday 4 (vs. Accrington Stanley) was postponed due to the EFL Cup first round tie being rescheduled.
- ^{2} Matchday 25 (vs. Newport County) was postponed due to a frozen pitch.
- ^{3} Matchday 40 (vs. Cheltenham Town) was postponed due to international call-ups.

==== Matches ====
Win Draw Loss Fixtures

| 2 August 2025 1 | Colchester United | 1–1 | Tranmere Rovers | Colchester |
| 15:00 BST | Anderson (yellow card) 22'; Lisbie (yellow card) 69', (goal) 87' | Report | Jennings 15'; Kenneh (yellow card) 79'; Solomon (yellow card) 89' | Stadium: Colchester Community Stadium; Attendance: 5,981; Referee: David Rock |

| 9 August 2025 2 | Tranmere Rovers | 4–0 | Shrewsbury Town | Birkenhead |
| 12:30 BST | Harris 19'; Davison 22'; Patrick 74'; Brough (yellow card) 85'; Dennis 88' | Report | Boyle (yellow card) 57' (yellow-red card) 58'; Perry (yellow card) 84' | Stadium: Prenton Park; Attendance: 7,620; Referee: Jamie O'Connor |
Note: Fixture was originally scheduled for a 15:00 kick-off, but was moved live Sky Sports broadcasting.

| 16 August 2025 3 | Tranmere Rovers | 1–1 | Gillingham | Birkenhead |
| 15:00 BST | Patrick 63'; Smallwood (yellow card) 77'; Norman (yellow card) 90+4' | Report | Dack (yellow card) 21'; Nevitt (yellow card) 39'; Clark (yellow card) 86' (yellow-red card) 90+4'; Gbodé 90+2' | Stadium: Prenton Park; Attendance: 6,981 (421 away); Referee: Declan Bourne |

| 23 August 2025 5 | Crawley Town | 0–2 | Tranmere Rovers | Crawley |
| 15:00 BST | Scott (yellow card) 8' | Report | Kenneh (yellow card) 10'; Whitaker (yellow card) 21'; Smallwood (yellow card) 45+1'; Smith 56'; Brough (yellow card) 67'; Patrick 80' | Stadium: Broadfield Stadium; Referee: Greg Rollason |

| 30 August 2025 6 | Tranmere Rovers | 1–2 | Notts County | Birkenhead |
| 15:00 BST | Smallwood (yellow card) 20'; Patrick 45'; Bristow (yellow card) 45+2'; Harris (yellow card) 69'; O'Connor (yellow card) 73'; McGee (yellow card) 90+7' | Report | Jones (yellow card) 45+2'; Dennis 49'; Gordon 62'; Roos (yellow card) 87' | Stadium: Prenton Park; Attendance: 7,610; Referee: Zac Kennard-Kettle |

| 6 September 2025 7 | Salford City | 3–1 | Tranmere Rovers | Salford |
| 15:00 BST | Mnoga (yellow card) 48'; Garbutt 56' (pen.); Stockton 81'; Ashley 86' | Report | Patrick 64' | Stadium: Peninsula Stadium; Attendance: 3,628; Referee: Andrew Humphries |

| 13 September 2025 8 | Tranmere Rovers | 1–1 | Newport County | Birkenhead |
| 15:00 BST | Joseph 33', (yellow card) 48'; Murphy (yellow card) 76' | Report | Reindorf (yellow card) 19'; Jenkins (yellow card) 37'; Baker-Richardson 87', (yellow card) 90' | Stadium: Prenton Park; Attendance: 6,345; Referee: Alan Young |

| 20 September 2025 9 | Walsall | 4–2 | Tranmere Rovers | Walsall |
| 15:00 BST | Weir 9', 45+5'; Kanu 61'; Adomah 90+1' | Report | Ironside 38', (yellow card) 40'; Blacker 89' | Stadium: Bescot Stadium; Attendance: 6,010 (685 away); Referee: Edward Duckworth |

| 27 September 2025 10 | Tranmere Rovers | 0–0 | Cambridge United | Birkenhead |
| 15:00 BST | Ironside (yellow card) 53' | Report | Mayor (yellow card) 32'; Ball (yellow card) 90+2' | Stadium: Prenton Park; Attendance: 7,319; Referee: Adam Herczeg |

| 4 October 2025 11 | Bromley | 3–3 | Tranmere Rovers | Bromley |
| 15:00 BST | Cameron 16', (yellow card) 20'; Kabamba 37'; Cheek 49' (pen.); Webster (red card) 71'; Charles (yellow card) 71' | Report | Smith 27'; Murphy (yellow card) 38'; Davison (yellow card) 41'; Patrick 50'; Brough (yellow card) 54'; Norman 60' | Stadium: Hayes Lane; Attendance: 3,589; Referee: James Oldham |

| 11 October 2025 12 | Tranmere Rovers | 0–2 | Barnet | Birkenhead |
| 15:00 BST | | Report | Ndlovu 26'; Senior 40'; Slicker (yellow card) 47', (red card) 90+6'; Collinge (yellow card) 52'; Crichlow (yellow card) 57'; Hawkins (yellow card) 82' | Stadium: Prenton Park; Attendance: 6,519; Referee: Richard Eley |

| 18 October 2025 13 | Bristol Rovers | 1–4 | Tranmere Rovers | Bristol |
| 15:00 BST | Harrison (yellow card) 5'; Chang 85'; Kilgour (yellow card) 90+1' | Report | Smith 33'; Jennings 51', 73'; Davison (yellow card) 55', (goal) 79'; Patrick (yellow card) 71' | Stadium: Memorial Stadium; Attendance: 7,835; Referee: Thomas Parsons |

| 25 October 2025 14 | Tranmere Rovers | 1–1 | Chesterfield | Birkenhead |
| 15:00 BST | Jennings 90+3' | Report | Patrick 12' (o.g.); Stirk (yellow card) 26'; Dunkley (yellow card) 40' | Stadium: Prenton Park; Attendance: 7,013; Referee: Scott Oldham |

| 28 October 2025 4 | Accrington Stanley | 1–1 | Tranmere Rovers | Accrington |
| 19:45 GMT | Whalley 16'; Madden (penalty missed) 65'; Heath (yellow card) 90+3' | Report | Whitaker 63'; Norman (yellow card) 64'; Blacker (yellow card) 78' | Stadium: Crown Ground; Attendance: 2,375; Referee: Martin Woods |
Note: Fixture was originally scheduled for 19 August, but was postponed due to the EFL Cup first round tie being rescheduled.

| 8 November 2025 15 | Swindon Town | 2–1 | Tranmere Rovers | Swindon |
| 15:00 GMT | Mabete (yellow card) 45'; Palmer (yellow card) 45+4' (goal) 74'; Munroe (yellow card) 89' (goal) 90+3' | Report | Norman (yellow card) 56'; Jennings (yellow card) 57'; Finley (yellow card) 66'; Dennis 88' | Stadium: County Ground; Attendance: 8,149; Referee: Gavin Ward |

| 15 November 2025 16 | Tranmere Rovers | 3–2 | Cheltenham Town | Birkenhead |
| 15:00 GMT | Wilson 2' (o.g.); Ironside 11'; Smith (yellow card) 66'; Smallwood (yellow card) 73'; Whitaker 86' | Report | Thomas 34'; Martin 77'; Young (yellow card) 85' | Stadium: Prenton Park; Attendance: 7,481; Referee: Oliver Langford |

| 22 November 2025 17 | Tranmere Rovers | 2–2 | Milton Keynes Dons | Birkenhead |
| 15:00 GMT | Whitaker 9', 27'; Finley (yellow card) 23'; Joseph (yellow card) 67' | Report | Leko (yellow card) 4' (yellow-red card) 79'; Mellish 78', (yellow card) 90+1'; Thompson-Sommers 82' | Stadium: Prenton Park; Attendance: 5,786; Referee: Richie Watkins |

| 27 November 2025 18 | Grimsby Town | 1–2 | Tranmere Rovers | Cleethorpes |
| 20:00 GMT | Burns 67' | Report | Whitaker 19'; Brough (yellow card) 54'; Jennings (yellow card) 73'; Kenneh (yellow card) 87'; Dennis 90+6', (yellow card) 90+8' | Stadium: Blundell Park; Attendance: 5,565; Referee: Will Finnie |
Note: Fixture was originally scheduled for 29 November, but was rescheduled for live Sky Sports broadcasting.

| 9 December 2025 19 | Barrow | 0–3 | Tranmere Rovers | Barrow-in-Furness |
| 19:45 GMT | Williams (yellow card) 20'; Gordon (yellow card) 51'; Canavan (yellow card) 53' (yellow-red card) 84'; McCann (yellow card) 84' | Report | Whitaker 53'; Ironside 67' (pen.); Dennis 86' (pen.), (yellow card) 72' | Stadium: Holker Street; Attendance: 2,106; Referee: Andrew Miller |

| 13 December 2025 20 | Tranmere Rovers | 1–4 | Crewe Alexandra | Birkenhead |
| 15:00 GMT | Norman (yellow card) 45+1'; Smith (yellow card) 45+9'; Joseph (yellow card) 56'; Connolly 82' (o.g.); McGowan (yellow card) 90+5' | Report | Sanders 17', 45+2'; Thibaut (yellow card) 45+9'; Tezgel 59'; Billington (yellow card) 63'; O'Reilly 71' | Stadium: Prenton Park; Attendance: 6,752 (834 away); Referee: Ross Joyce |

| 20 December 2025 21 | Oldham Athletic | 3–1 | Tranmere Rovers | Oldham |
| 15:00 GMT | Mellon 31', 47', 61'; Garner (yellow card) 40'; Caprice (yellow card) 49'; Fondop (red card) 68'; Hudson (yellow card) 87' | Report | Turnbull (yellow card) 37'; Whitaker 41' | Stadium: Boundary Park; Attendance: 8,838 (1,792 away); Referee: Martin Coy |

| 26 December 2025 22 | Tranmere Rovers | 1–0 | Fleetwood Town | Birkenhead |
| 15:00 GMT | Bristow (yellow card) 11'; Whitaker 23', (yellow card) 90+6'; Blacker (yellow card) 33'; Dennis (yellow card) 37'; Smith (yellow card) 80' | Report | Neal (yellow card) 76'; Evans (yellow card) 90+7' | Stadium: Prenton Park; Attendance: 7,933 (289 away); Referee: Dale Baines |

| 29 December 2025 23 | Tranmere Rovers | 1–3 | Barrow | Birkenhead |
| 15:00 GMT | Turnbull (yellow card) 40'; Brough 50'; Smith (yellow card) 84' | Report | Canavan (yellow card) 4' (yellow-red card) 64'; Jackson 8'; Raglan 18'; Fletcher 32'; Harper (yellow card) 35'; Smith (yellow card) 90+7' | Stadium: Prenton Park; Attendance: 6,706 (217 away); Referee: Elliott Swallow |

| 1 January 2026 24 | Harrogate Town | 0–2 | Tranmere Rovers | Harrogate |
| 15:00 GMT | O'Connor (yellow card) 50'; Morris (yellow card) 90+1' | Report | Turnbull (yellow card) 27'; Norman 73', 90+2' | Stadium: Wetherby Road; Attendance: 3,610 |

| 10 January 2026 26 | Tranmere Rovers | 0–2 | Bromley | Birkenhead |
| 15:00 GMT | Ironside (yellow card) 15'; Brough (yellow card) 49' | Report | Cheek 2', 57', (yellow card) 59'; Odutayo (yellow card) 41'; Hondermarck (yellow card) 73' | Stadium: Prenton Park; Attendance: 5,930; Referee: Martin Woods |

| 17 January 2026 27 | Tranmere Rovers | 1–3 | Walsall | Birkenhead |
| 12:30 GMT | Finley (yellow card) 81'; Ironside 90' | Report | Farquharson 38'; Barrett (yellow card) 43'; Kanu 45'; Matt 65'; Łopata (yellow card) 90+4' | Stadium: Prenton Park; Attendance: 5,751 (504 away); Referee: Darren Drysdale |
Note: Fixture was initially scheduled for a 15:00 kick-off, but was rescheduled for live Sky Sports broadcasting.

| 24 January 2026 28 | Cambridge United | 4–2 | Tranmere Rovers | Cambridge |
| 15:00 GMT | Hoddle (yellow card) 19'; Brophy (yellow card) 35'; Lavery 58'; Watts 67', 77'; Knight 90+6' | Report | Smith (yellow card) 15'; Jones 45'; Blacker (yellow card) 54'; Whitaker 63'; McGowan (yellow card) 86' | Stadium: Abbey Stadium; Attendance: 6,800 (584 away); Referee: Ross Martin |

| 27 January 2026 29 | Barnet | 1–0 | Tranmere Rovers | Edgware |
| 19:45 GMT | Tshimanga (yellow card) 37'; Glover (yellow card) 58'; Shelton 90+6' | Report | Murphy (yellow card) 45+6'; Tamen (yellow card) 52'; Finley (yellow card) 54' | Stadium: The Hive Stadium; Attendance: 1,983 (422 away); Referee: Carl Brook |

| 31 January 2026 30 | Tranmere Rovers | 0–2 | Salford City | Birkenhead |
| 15:00 GMT | Finley (yellow card) 81'; Dennis (yellow card) 90+5' | Report | Grant 68'; N'Mai 75' | Stadium: Prenton Park; Attendance: 6,203; Referee: Richard Eley |

| 7 February 2026 31 | Gillingham | 2–1 | Tranmere Rovers | Gillingham |
| 15:00 GMT | Hale 25', 65' | Report | Whitaker 78' | Stadium: Priestfield Stadium; Attendance: 5,564 (244 away); Referee: Craig Hicks |

| 14 February 2026 32 | Tranmere Rovers | 2–0 | Crawley Town | Birkenhead |
| 15:00 GMT | Obiero 12'; Whitaker (yellow card) 38'; Ironside 45' (pen.); Plant (yellow card) 56'; Warrington (yellow card) 83'; Maroši (yellow card) 90+6' | Report | Bajrami (yellow card) 44' | Stadium: Prenton Park; Attendance: 5,739 (181 away); Referee: Andrew Humphries |

| 17 February 2026 33 | Tranmere Rovers | 0–1 | Accrington Stanley | Birkenhead |
| 19:45 GMT | Warrington (yellow card) 51' | Report | Love (yellow card) 29'; Madden 48', (yellow card) 80'; Butterfield (red card) 63'; Heath (yellow card) 90+1'; Woods (red card) 90+5' | Stadium: Prenton Park; Attendance: 5,585 (169 away); Referee: Edward Duckworth |

| 21 February 2026 34 | Notts County | 5–0 | Tranmere Rovers | Nottingham |
| 15:00 GMT | Lowe 15' (o.g.); Platt (yellow card) 45'; Ndlovu 46', 55'; Jones 57'; Dennis 86' (pen.) | Report | Obiero (yellow card) 34'; Warrington (yellow card) 41' | Stadium: Meadow Lane; Attendance: 10,329 (754 away); Referee: Harry Wager |

| 28 February 2026 35 | Crewe Alexandra | 2–1 | Tranmere Rovers | Crewe |
| 15:00 GMT | Thomas 77'; March 90+1', (yellow card) 90+2' | Report | Plant 44'; Finley (yellow card) 51'; Obiero (yellow card) 90'; Warrington (yellow card) 90+5' | Stadium: Gresty Road; Attendance: 6,253; Referee: Harrison Blair |

| 3 March 2026 25 | Newport County | 3–1 | Tranmere Rovers | Newport |
| 19:45 GMT | | | | Stadium: Rodney Parade |
Note: Fixture was originally scheduled for 4 January, but it was postponed due to a frozen pitch.

| 7 March 2026 36 | Tranmere Rovers | 1–3 | Oldham Athletic | Birkenhead |
| 15:00 GMT | Lowe (yellow card) 38'; Murphy (yellow card) 72'; Obiero 90+5' | Report | Fondop 20'; Stevens (yellow card) 42', (goal) 75' (pen.); Kavanagh 45+3' | Stadium: Prenton Park; Attendance: 8,107; Referee: Sam Mulhall |

| 14 March 2026 37 | Fleetwood Town | 0–0 | Tranmere Rovers | Fleetwood |
| 15:00 GMT | | Report | Smith (yellow card) 38'; Obiero (yellow card) 42'; Brough (yellow card) 43' | Stadium: Highbury Stadium; Attendance: 3,204 (706 away); Referee: Emily Heaslip |

| 17 March 2026 38 | Tranmere Rovers | 0–3 | Harrogate Town | Birkenhead |
| 19:45 GMT | Norman (yellow card) 45'; Whitaker (yellow card) 50'; Kenneh (yellow card) 79' | Report | Smith 9'; Headman 11', 39'; Hill (yellow card) 59' | Stadium: Prenton Park; Referee: Kirsty Dowle |

| 21 March 2026 39 | Tranmere Rovers | 0–1 | Swindon Town | Birkenhead |
| 15:00 GMT | Solomon (yellow card) 69' | Report | Hoilett 90+1' | Stadium: Prenton Park; Attendance: 5,762; Referee: Thomas Parsons |

| 3 April 2026 41 | Shrewsbury Town | 1–0 | Tranmere Rovers | Shrewsbury |
| 15:00 BST | Stubbs 55' | Report | Brough (yellow card) 86' | Stadium: New Meadow; Attendance: 7,012; Referee: Ollie Yates |

| 6 April 2026 42 | Tranmere Rovers | 0–1 | Colchester United | Birkenhead |
| 15:00 BST | | Report | Payne 75' | Stadium: Prenton Park; Referee: Scott Oldham |

| 11 April 2026 43 | Chesterfield | 1–1 | Tranmere Rovers | Chesterfield |
| 15:00 BST | Naylor 44' | Report | Finley 53' | Stadium: SMH Group Stadium; Attendance: 7,953; Referee: Seb Stockbridge |

| 18 April 2026 44 | Tranmere Rovers | 1–2 | Bristol Rovers | Birkenhead |
| 15:00 BST | Joseph 71' | Report | Omochere 65'; Akhamrich 84' | Stadium: Prenton Park; Referee: Carl Brook |

| 21 April 2026 40 | Cheltenham Town | 1–3 | Tranmere Rovers | Cheltenham |
| 19:45 BST | Miller 40' | Report | Smith 47'; Joseph 64'; Patrick 85' | Stadium: Whaddon Road; Attendance: 3,312; Referee: Stephen Parkinson |
Note: Fixture was initially scheduled for 28 March, but was needed to be rearranged due to international call-ups.

| 25 April 2026 45 | Milton Keynes Dons | 3–0 | Tranmere Rovers | Milton Keynes |
| 12:30 BST | Mendez-Laing 18'; Gilbey 21'; Paterson 78' | Report | | Stadium: Stadium MK; Referee: Tom Reeves |
Note: Fixture was initially scheduled for a 15:00 kick-off, but was brought forward for live Sky Sports broadcasting.

| 2 May 2026 46 | Tranmere Rovers | 1–1 | Grimsby Town | Birkenhead |
| 15:00 BST | | | | Stadium: Prenton Park |

=== FA Cup ===
Tranmere were drawn at home to Stockport County in the first round.

Win Draw Loss Fixtures

| 1 November 2025 First round | Tranmere Rovers | 1–3 | Stockport County | Birkenhead |
| 15:00 GMT | Patrick 71'; Smallwood (yellow card) 88'; Finley (yellow card) 90+3' | Report | Diamond 55'; Norwood 74'; Lowe 90+1' | Stadium: Prenton Park; Attendance: 5,164; Referee: Simon Mather |

=== EFL Cup ===
Tranmere were drawn at home to Burton Albion in the first round.

Win Draw Loss Fixtures

| 19 August 2025 First round | Tranmere Rovers | 1–1 (4–5 p) | Burton Albion | Birkenhead |
| 19:45 BST | Whitaker 37'; Jennnings (yellow card) 41' | Report | Whitfield 10'; Newall (yellow card) 72'; Sibbick (yellow card) 90+7' | Stadium: Prenton Park; Attendance: 3,524; Referee: Simon Mather |
| | Penalties |
| | Patrick (penalty scored); Lowe (penalty scored); Harris (penalty scored); Blacker (penalty missed); O'Connor (penalty missed); Norman (penalty scored); Davison (penalty missed) | | (penalty missed) Whitfield; (penalty scored) Revan; (penalty scored) Larsson; (penalty missed) Tavares; (penalty scored) Williams; (penalty scored) Akoto; (penalty scored) Delap |
Note: Fixture was originally scheduled for 12 August, but was postponed due to a major power outage.

=== EFL Trophy ===
Tranmere were drawn against Barrow, Blackpool and Nottingham Forest U21 in the group stage. After winning the group, Rovers were guaranteed a home tie in the round of 32 and were drawn against Fleetwood Town.

| Pos | Div | Team | Pld | W | PW | PL | L | GF | GA | GD | Pts | Qualification |
|---|---|---|---|---|---|---|---|---|---|---|---|---|
| 1 | L2 | Tranmere Rovers | 3 | 2 | 1 | 0 | 0 | 6 | 4 | +2 | 8 | Advance to Round 2 |
| 2 | L1 | Blackpool | 3 | 2 | 0 | 0 | 1 | 8 | 3 | +5 | 6 | Advance to Round 2 |
| 3 | L2 | Barrow | 3 | 1 | 0 | 0 | 2 | 3 | 7 | −4 | 3 | |
| 4 | ACA | Nottingham Forest U21 | 3 | 0 | 0 | 1 | 2 | 3 | 6 | −3 | 1 | |

Source: EFL

Win Draw Loss Fixtures

| 9 September 2025 North Group B | Tranmere Rovers | 2–2 (9–8 p) | Nottingham Forest U21 | Birkenhead |
| 19:00 BST | Turnbull 17'; Solomon (yellow card) 18'; Davison 59'; Norman (yellow card) 89' | Report | Smith 2'; J. Thompson (yellow card) 35'; K. Thompson 88' | Stadium: Prenton Park; Referee: Rob Massey-Ellis |
| | Penalties |
| | Patrick (penalty scored); Smallwood (penalty scored); Jennings (penalty scored); Whitaker (penalty scored); Harris (penalty missed); Davison (penalty missed); Lowe (penalty scored); Norman (penalty scored); Brough (penalty scored); Smith (penalty scored); Barrett (penalty scored) | | (penalty scored) Abbott; (penalty scored) Sillah; (penalty missed) McClure; (penalty scored) Newton; (penalty scored) Sinclair; (penalty missed) Nwosu; (penalty scored) K. Thompson; (penalty scored) Smith; (penalty scored) J. Thompson; (penalty scored) Hanks; (penalty missed) Campbell |

| 7 October 2025 North Group B | Barrow | 1–2 | Tranmere Rovers | Barrow-in-Furness |
| 19:30 BST | Newby 8'; Booty (yellow card) 45+1'; Harper (yellow card) 58'; Cameron (yellow card) 60' | Report | Whitaker 22', 80'; Brough (yellow card) 72' | Stadium: Holker Street; Attendance: 581; Referee: William Davis |

| 11 November 2025 North Group B | Tranmere Rovers | 2–1 | Blackpool | Birkenhead |
| 19:00 GMT | Brough 24'; Ironside 75'; Harris (yellow card) 85'; Norman (yellow card) 88' | Report | Banks 18'; Knight (yellow card) 38'; Evans (yellow card) 44' | Stadium: Prenton Park; Referee: Declan Brown |

| 2 December 2025 Round of 32 | Tranmere Rovers | 0–3 | Fleetwood Town | Birkenhead |
| 19:00 GMT | | Report | Potter (yellow card) 54'; Brough 56' (o.g.); Coughlan 71'; Medley (yellow card) 76'; Helm 88' | Stadium: Prenton Park; Referee: Aaron Bannister |

== Statistics ==
=== Appearances and goals ===
Players with no appearances are not included on the list; italics indicate loaned in player

| No. | Pos | Nat | Player | Total | | League Two | | FA Cup | | EFL Cup | | EFL Trophy | |
| No. | Pos | Nat | Player | Apps | Goals | Apps | Goals | Apps | Goals | Apps | Goals | Apps | Goals |
|---|---|---|---|---|---|---|---|---|---|---|---|---|---|
| 1 | GK | (England) ENG | Luke McGee | 6 | 0 | 5+0 | 0 | 0+0 | 0 | 1+0 | 0 | 0+0 | 0 |
| 2 | DF | (England) ENG | Cameron Norman | 43 | 3 | 25+13 | 3 | 1+0 | 0 | 1+0 | 0 | 2+1 | 0 |
| 3 | DF | (England) ENG | Patrick Brough | 47 | 2 | 38+4 | 1 | 1+0 | 0 | 0+0 | 0 | 4+0 | 1 |
| 4 | DF | (England) ENG | Jordan Turnbull | 16 | 1 | 8+6 | 0 | 0+0 | 0 | 1+0 | 0 | 1+0 | 1 |
| 5 | DF | (England) ENG | Nathan Smith | 52 | 5 | 46+0 | 5 | 1+0 | 0 | 1+0 | 0 | 2+2 | 0 |
| 6 | MF | (England) ENG | Richard Smallwood | 32 | 0 | 20+6 | 0 | 1+0 | 0 | 1+0 | 0 | 2+2 | 0 |
| 7 | MF | (England) ENG | Charlie Whitaker | 47 | 13 | 34+7 | 10 | 1+0 | 0 | 1+0 | 1 | 2+2 | 2 |
| 8 | MF | (England) ENG | Sam Finley | 33 | 2 | 28+2 | 2 | 1+0 | 0 | 0+0 | 0 | 1+1 | 0 |
| 9 | FW | (England) ENG | Kristian Dennis | 28 | 4 | 7+18 | 4 | 0+1 | 0 | 0+0 | 0 | 2+0 | 0 |
| 10 | FW | (England) ENG | Josh Davison | 28 | 3 | 9+14 | 2 | 0+0 | 0 | 0+1 | 0 | 3+1 | 1 |
| 11 | FW | (England) ENG | Omari Patrick | 41 | 8 | 32+4 | 7 | 1+0 | 1 | 0+1 | 0 | 0+3 | 0 |
| 12 | GK | (England) ENG | Jack Barrett | 9 | 0 | 3+1 | 0 | 1+0 | 0 | 0+0 | 0 | 4+0 | 0 |
| 13 | GK | (Republic of Ireland) IRL | Joe Murphy | 22 | 0 | 22+0 | 0 | 0+0 | 0 | 0+0 | 0 | 0+0 | 0 |
| 14 | DF | (England) ENG | Jayden Joseph | 35 | 3 | 23+7 | 3 | 0+1 | 0 | 0+0 | 0 | 4+0 | 0 |
| 15 | DF | (England) ENG | William Tamen | 10 | 0 | 10+0 | 0 | 0+0 | 0 | 0+0 | 0 | 0+0 | 0 |
| 16 | MF | (England) ENG | Jason Lowe | 19 | 0 | 6+10 | 0 | 0+0 | 0 | 1+0 | 0 | 2+0 | 0 |
| 17 | FW | Jersey | Sol Solomon | 18 | 0 | 3+10 | 0 | 0+1 | 0 | 1+0 | 0 | 2+1 | 0 |
| 18 | FW | (England) ENG | Connor Jennings | 33 | 4 | 13+15 | 4 | 1+0 | 0 | 1+0 | 0 | 2+1 | 0 |
| 19 | FW | (England) ENG | Harvey Saunders | 1 | 0 | 0+0 | 0 | 0+0 | 0 | 0+1 | 0 | 0+0 | 0 |
| 22 | DF | (Republic of Ireland) IRL | Lee O'Connor | 12 | 0 | 9+2 | 0 | 0+0 | 0 | 0+1 | 0 | 0+0 | 0 |
| 23 | DF | (Saint Kitts and Nevis) SKN | Ethan Bristow | 21 | 0 | 13+6 | 0 | 0+0 | 0 | 1+0 | 0 | 1+0 | 0 |
| 24 | MF | (England) ENG | Billy Blacker | 29 | 1 | 15+9 | 1 | 1+0 | 0 | 1+0 | 0 | 2+1 | 0 |
| 25 | MF | (England) ENG | Lewis Warrington | 9 | 0 | 8+1 | 0 | 0+0 | 0 | 0+0 | 0 | 0+0 | 0 |
| 26 | DF | (England) ENG | James Plant | 14 | 1 | 9+5 | 1 | 0+0 | 0 | 0+0 | 0 | 0+0 | 0 |
| 27 | FW | (England) ENG | Dylan Jones | 4 | 1 | 4+0 | 1 | 0+0 | 0 | 0+0 | 0 | 0+0 | 0 |
| 28 | DF | (Republic of Ireland) IRL | Stephan Negru | 14 | 0 | 14+0 | 0 | 0+0 | 0 | 0+0 | 0 | 0+0 | 0 |
| 29 | FW | (England) ENG | Joe Ironside | 42 | 6 | 28+9 | 5 | 0+1 | 0 | 0+0 | 0 | 2+2 | 1 |
| 30 | DF | (England) ENG | Aaron McGowan | 25 | 0 | 15+8 | 0 | 1+0 | 0 | 0+0 | 0 | 0+1 | 0 |
| 31 | FW | (England) ENG | Max Dickov | 8 | 0 | 0+8 | 0 | 0+0 | 0 | 0+0 | 0 | 0+0 | 0 |
| 32 | MF | (Kenya) KEN | Zech Obiero | 13 | 2 | 11+2 | 2 | 0+0 | 0 | 0+0 | 0 | 0+0 | 0 |
| 33 | GK | (Slovakia) SVK | Marko Maroši | 16 | 0 | 16+0 | 0 | 0+0 | 0 | 0+0 | 0 | 0+0 | 0 |
| 41 | FW | (England) ENG | Kaiyne Woolery | 8 | 0 | 5+3 | 0 | 0+0 | 0 | 0+0 | 0 | 0+0 | 0 |
| 42 | MF | (Liberia) LBR | Nohan Kenneh | 37 | 0 | 20+15 | 0 | 0+0 | 0 | 0+0 | 0 | 2+0 | 0 |
| 44 | MF | (England) ENG | Ryan Watson | 6 | 0 | 3+3 | 0 | 0+0 | 0 | 0+0 | 0 | 0+0 | 0 |
Player(s) who featured whilst on loan but returned to their parent club during the season:
| 25 | FW | (England) ENG | Taylan Harris | 19 | 1 | 4+9 | 1 | 0+1 | 0 | 0+1 | 0 | 4+0 | 0 |
