= Jayden Joseph =

English footballer (born 2006)

Personal information
- Full name: Jayden Kyle Joseph
- Date of birth: 29 April 2006 (age 20)
- Place of birth: Huddersfield, England
- Positions: Full-back; winger

Team information
- Current team: Leicester City
- Number: 2

Youth career
- –2022: Manchester City
- 2022–2025: Leicester City

Senior career*
Years	Team	Apps	(Gls)
2025–	Leicester City	6	(1)
2025–2026	→ Tranmere Rovers (loan)	30	(3)
- * Club domestic league appearances and goals as of 11:59, 22 November 2026 (UTC)

Jayden Kyle Joseph (born 29 April 2006) is an English professional footballer who plays as a full-back and winger for EFL League One club Leicester City.

== Career ==
Joseph was born in Huddersfield. Following a spell with the Manchester City Academy, Joseph joined Leicester City aged sixteen, signing a first professional contract in August 2024.

On 19 August 2025, Joseph joined League Two club Tranmere Rovers on a season-long loan. He made his first start on 10 September 2025, appearing in the EFL Trophy, and scored his first goal for the club on 13 September 2025. It was his first senior goal on his first-ever league start. On 1 January 2026, he extended his loan until the end of the season.

On 15 August 2026, he scored on his league debut for Leicester City. In September he extended his contract with Leicester to 2030.

== Career statistics ==
As of match played 21 November 2026

Appearances and goals by club, season and competition
Club	Season	League			FA Cup		League Cup		Other		Total	
Club	Season	Division	Apps	Goals	Apps	Goals	Apps	Goals	Apps	Goals	Apps	Goals
Leicester City U21	2024–25	—			—		—		3 (Note: Appearances in EFL Trophy)	0	3	0
Leicester City	2025–26	Championship	0	0	0	0	0	0	—		0	0
Leicester City	2026–27	League One	6	1	0	0	2	0	0	0	8	1
Leicester City	Total		6	1	0	0	2	0	0	0	8	1
Tranmere Rovers (loan)	2025–26	League Two	30	3	1	0	—		4	0	35	3
Career total			36	3	1	0	2	0	7	0	46	3
