= Billy Blacker =

English footballer (born 2006)

Personal information
- Full name: Billy Rolfe Blacker
- Date of birth: 25 May 2006 (age 20)
- Place of birth: Calderdale, England
- Position: Defensive midfielder

Team information
- Current team: Sheffield United

Youth career
- –2025: Sheffield United

Senior career*
Years	Team	Apps	(Gls)
2025–	Sheffield United	1	(0)
2025–2026	→ Tranmere Rovers (loan)	23	(1)
- * Club domestic league appearances and goals as of 00:40, 1 April 2026 (UTC)

Billy Rolfe Blacker (born 25 May 2006) is an English professional footballer who plays as a defensive midfielder for EFL Championship side Sheffield United.

== Career ==
He is a product of the Sheffield United academy and made his debut for the under-21 team during the 2023–24 season. He is considered capable of playing in midfield or in further forward positions. He appeared on the substitute bench for Sheffield United in the Premier League during the 2023–24 season without making his professional debut. He signed his first professional contract with the club in the summer of 2024.

He made his senior debut for Sheffield United in the FA Cup third round against Cardiff City on 9 January 2025. He made his EFL Championship debut as a second-half substitute against Swansea City on 21 January 2025.

In July 2025, Blacker joined Tranmere Rovers on a season-long loan for the 2025–26 season in search of regular first-team football.

== Personal life ==
He attended Calder High School in Mytholmroyd near Hebden Bridge.

== Career statistics ==
As of match played 9 September 2025

Appearances and goals by club, season and competition
Club	Season	League			FA Cup		EFL Cup		Other		Total	
Club	Season	Division	Apps	Goals	Apps	Goals	Apps	Goals	Apps	Goals	Apps	Goals
Sheffield United	2024-25	Championship	1	0	1	0	0	0	0	0	2	0
Sheffield United	2025-26	Championship	0	0	0	0	0	0	—		0	0
Sheffield United	Total		1	0	1	0	0	0	0	0	2	0
Tranmere Rovers (loan)	2025-26	League Two	5	1	0	0	1	0	1 (Note: Appearance(s) in EFL Trophy)	0	5	0
Career total			4	0	1	0	1	0	1	0	7	0
