= Charlie Whitaker =

English footballer (born 2003)

Personal information
- Full name: Charlie Jay Whitaker
- Date of birth: 16 September 2003 (age 23)
- Place of birth: Leeds, England
- Position: Attacking midfielder

Team information
- Current team: Tranmere Rovers
- Number: 7

Youth career
- Blackburn Rovers
- 2016–2022: Everton

Senior career*
Years	Team	Apps	(Gls)
2022–2025	Everton	0	(0)
2025	Notts County	21	(4)
2025–	Tranmere Rovers	62	(14)
- * Club domestic league appearances and goals as of 22:49, 7 August 2026 (UTC)

Charlie Jay Whitaker (born 16 September 2003) is an English professional footballer who plays as an attacking midfielder for EFL League Two side Tranmere Rovers.

== Career ==
=== Early career and Notts County ===
A product of the Everton academy having joined from Blackburn Rovers at the age of 12 years-old, he signed a three-year contract at the club in 2022. Having scored seven goals in nine appearances for the Everton U21 side in Premier League 2 to start the 2024-25 season, he joined Notts County on a free transfer agreeing to a six-month contract on 13 January 2025. That week he was included in their match-day squad for their EFL League Two match against Accrington Stanley and made his debut as a second-half substitute in a 3–0 victory.

On 20 May 2025, Notts County said the player would be released in June when his contract expired.

=== Tranmere Rovers ===
On 23 June 2025, Whitaker agreed to join League Two side Tranmere Rovers on a two-year deal.

== Style of play ==
For the Everton youth side he featured as an attacking midfielder and winger. Upon signing for Notts County, director-of-football Richard Montague described him as "best suited to central attacking areas" but added that he had the versatility to be "comfortable playing out wide".

== Career statistics ==
As of match played 7 August 2026

Appearances and goals by club, season and competition
Club	Season	League			FA Cup		EFL Cup		Other		Total	
Club	Season	Division	Apps	Goals	Apps	Goals	Apps	Goals	Apps	Goals	Apps	Goals
Everton U21	2021–22	—			—		—		3 (Note: Appearance(s) in EFL Trophy)	0	3	0
Everton U21	2022–23	—			—		—		3	1	3	1
Everton U21	2024–25	—			—		—		3	0	3	0
Everton U21	Total		—		—		—		9	1	9	1
Notts County	2024–25	League Two	20	4	0	0	0	0	1 (Note: Appearance(s) in EFL League Two play-offs)	0	21	4
Tranmere Rovers	2025–26	League Two	42	10	0	0	1	1	4	2	47	12
Tranmere Rovers	2026–27	League Two	0	0	0	0	1	1	0	0	1	1
Career total			62	14	0	0	2	2	14	3	78	18
