= Jacob Slater =

Irish footballer (born 2004)

Personal information
- Full name: Jacob Vaughan Slater
- Date of birth: 5 October 2004 (age 22)
- Place of birth: Sefton, England
- Height: 1.82 m (6 ft 0 in)
- Position: Left-back

Team information
- Current team: Tranmere Rovers
- Number: 3

Youth career
- 2016–2023: Preston North End
- 2023–2025: Brighton & Hove Albion

Senior career*
| Years | Team | Apps | (Gls) |
| 2022–2023 | Preston North End | 1 | (0) |
| 2023–2026 | Brighton & Hove Albion | 0 | (0) |
| 2025–2026 | → Harrogate Town (loan) | 32 | (1) |
| 2026– | Tranmere Rovers | 0 | (0) |

International career^{‡}
| 2024–2025 | Republic of Ireland U21 | 8 | (0) |
- * Club domestic league appearances and goals as of 22:57, 25 June 2026 (UTC) ‡ National team caps and goals as of 00:16, 18 November 2026 (UTC)

Jacob Vaughan Slater (born 5 October 2004) is an Irish footballer who plays as a left-back for EFL League Two club Tranmere Rovers.

== Career ==
=== Preston North End ===
Slater joined the Preston North End academy at under-12s level, signing a scholarship in June 2021.

On 9 August 2022, Slater made his professional debut in a 4–1 EFL Cup victory over Huddersfield Town. Having continued to be involved with the first-team squad, he was rewarded with a first professional two-year contract in September 2022.

=== Brighton & Hove Albion ===
On 29 July 2023, Slater signed for the youth academy of Premier League club Brighton & Hove Albion on a three-year deal for an undisclosed fee. In June 2026 it was announced that he had been released by Brighton having not made a first team appearance, although he was an unused substitute thrice.

==== Harrogate Town loan ====
On 1 September 2025, Slater joined League Two club Harrogate Town on a season-long loan deal. He made his debut in a 2–0 victory over Shrewsbury Town on 20 September in a performance labelled as "immense" by manager Simon Weaver.

=== Tranmere Rovers ===
On 25 June 2026, it was announced that Slater would join EFL League Two club Tranmere Rovers on 1 July 2026, signing a two-year contract.

== Career statistics ==
As of match played 1 August 2026

Appearances and goals by club, season and competition
| Club | Season | League | | | FA Cup | | League Cup | | Other | | Total | |
| Club | Season | Division | Apps | Goals | Apps | Goals | Apps | Goals | Apps | Goals | Apps | Goals |
|---|---|---|---|---|---|---|---|---|---|---|---|---|
| Preston North End | 2022–23 | Championship | 1 | 0 | 0 | 0 | 2 | 0 | — | | 3 | 0 |
| Brighton & Hove Albion U21 | 2023–24 | — | | | — | | — | | 4 (Note: Appearance(s) in EFL Trophy) | 0 | 4 | 0 |
| Brighton & Hove Albion U21 | 2024–25 | — | | | — | | — | | 1 | 0 | 1 | 0 |
| Brighton & Hove Albion U21 | Total | | | | — | | — | | 5 | 0 | 5 | 0 |
| Brighton & Hove Albion | 2025–26 | Premier League | 0 | 0 | 0 | 0 | 0 | 0 | — | | 0 | 0 |
| Harrogate Town (loan) | 2025–26 | League Two | 32 | 1 | 1 | 0 | 0 | 0 | 3 | 0 | 36 | 1 |
| Tranmere Rovers | 2026–27 | League Two | 0 | 0 | 0 | 0 | 1 | 0 | 0 | 0 | 1 | 0 |
| Career total | | | 33 | 1 | 1 | 0 | 3 | 0 | 8 | 0 | 45 | 1 |
