= Tom Ince =

English footballer

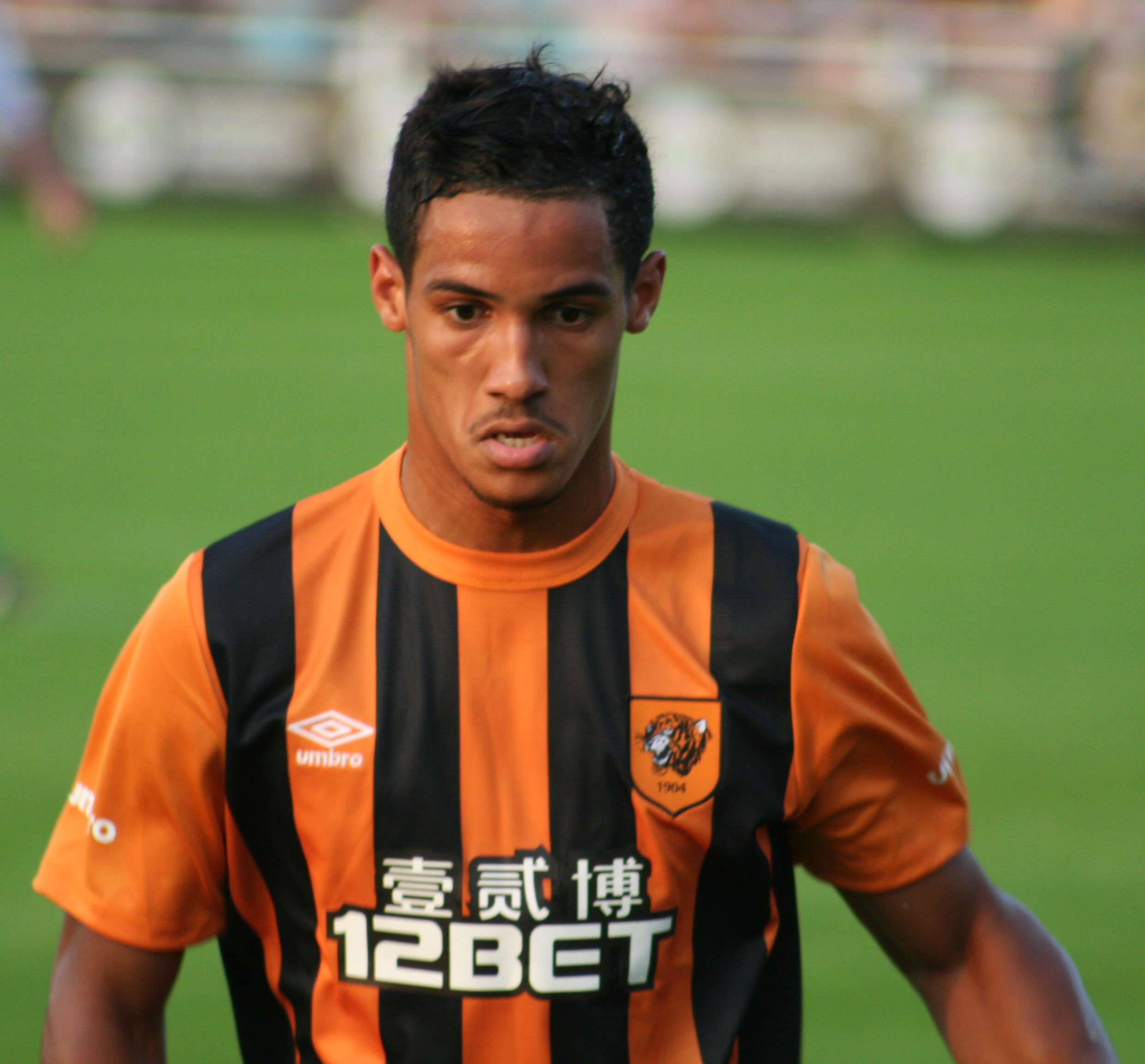
- Ince playing for Hull City in 2014

Personal information
- Full name: Thomas Christopher Ince
- Date of birth: 30 January 1992 (age 34)
- Place of birth: Stockport, England
- Height: 5 ft 10 in (1.78 m)
- Positions: Right winger; right midfielder

Team information
- Current team: Tranmere Rovers
- Number: 10

Youth career
- 2008–2010: Liverpool

Senior career*
Years	Team	Apps	(Gls)
2010–2011	Liverpool	0	(0)
2010–2011	→ Notts County (loan)	6	(2)
2011–2014	Blackpool	100	(31)
2014	→ Crystal Palace (loan)	8	(1)
2014–2015	Hull City	7	(0)
2014	→ Nottingham Forest (loan)	6	(0)
2015	→ Derby County (loan)	18	(11)
2015–2017	Derby County	87	(26)
2017–2018	Huddersfield Town	33	(2)
2018–2022	Stoke City	94	(12)
2021	→ Luton Town (loan)	7	(0)
2022	→ Reading (loan)	15	(2)
2022–2023	Reading	33	(9)
2023–2026	Watford	86	(7)
2026–	Tranmere Rovers	3	(1)

International career
2009	England U17	4	(0)
2011	England U19	4	(0)
2012–2014	England U21	18	(3)
- * Club domestic league appearances and goals as of 5 July 2026 (UTC)

Thomas Christopher Ince (born 30 January 1992) is an English professional footballer who plays as a right winger or right midfielder for EFL League Two club Tranmere Rovers.

The son of former England midfielder Paul Ince, Tom Ince began his career with Liverpool, for whom he made his professional debut in the 2010–11 season, coming on as a substitute in the League Cup. He later spent time that season on loan at League One club Notts County, scoring twice in eight appearances. At the end of the season, Ince turned down a new contract and moved to Blackpool, who had just been relegated from the Premier League. In two and a half seasons at Blackpool, Ince played 113 games in all competitions and scored 33 goals. He also won the 2013 Football League Young Player of the Year Award and was named in the 2012–13 PFA Team of the Year.

In January 2014, he signed on loan for Premier League club Crystal Palace, for whom he scored his first Premier League goal, and returned to the division permanently at the end of the season, joining Hull City on a free transfer. Ince did not feature regularly for Hull in the 2014–15 season, spending time on loan at the end of 2014 with Nottingham Forest before returning briefly to Hull. A loan spell at the end of the season with Derby County was a success, with Ince scoring 11 goals in 18 appearances. At the end of the season, he joined Derby for a fee of £4.75 million, briefly becoming the club's most-expensive signing. Ince spent the 2017–18 season with Huddersfield Town before joining Stoke City in July 2018 for a fee of £10million. Ince spent four seasons with Stoke before joining Reading in the summer of 2022.

Ince has been capped internationally for England at under-17, under-19 and under-21 levels.

== Early and personal life ==
Ince was born in Stockport, Greater Manchester. He has a younger brother and sister. His father Paul played professional football at the top level with England, Inter Milan, Manchester United and Liverpool. When Ince was three years old he moved to Italy after Paul had signed for Inter Milan where he attended an Italian school and became fluent in Italian, the family spent two years in Italy before returning to England.

He has two daughters with Charly Cottrell, the eldest born on 11 July 2013.

== Club career ==
=== Liverpool ===
Ince signed for Liverpool as a youth player in 2008 and was handed a first-team squad number (number 45) at the start of the 2010–11 season. On 29 July 2010, he was an unused substitute for the first time in Liverpool's UEFA Europa League qualifier against FK Rabotnički. He made his debut for Liverpool on 22 September 2010 as a 106th-minute substitute for Daniel Pacheco in the club's third round League Cup defeat to Northampton Town at Anfield.

On 1 November 2010, Ince linked up with his father Paul Ince, who was the manager of League One club Notts County, signing a short-term loan deal from Liverpool until January 2011. He signed on loan alongside 22-year-old right back Stephen Darby. Ince made his County debut on 6 November in the 2–0 FA Cup first round victory against Gateshead. On 13 November, he made his league debut in the 3–1 away loss to Exeter City. On 11 December, Ince scored his first career goal, in County's 2–0 league win against Milton Keynes Dons.

At the end of December 2010, Ince said that joining his father at Notts County had benefited him as he had "got a bit lost" at Liverpool, who had tried to change his style of play. He found that his father "wanted me to be the player that I was" and that the move had "given me a fresher life". Ince scored for County for a second time on 3 January 2011 in a 3–0 win against Hartlepool United before his loan expired on 10 January and he returned to Liverpool.

Despite his father's repeated attempts to re-sign his son on loan, Liverpool refused. Ince's contract expired at the end of the 2010–11 season and they would not let Ince go back out on loan unless he signed a new long-term contract. Ince's father described the contract offer as "derisory" and called Liverpool "silly" for refusing to let Ince re-join his club on loan. Ultimately, Ince declined to sign a new contract with Liverpool and so he left the club on a free transfer at the end of the season.

=== Blackpool ===
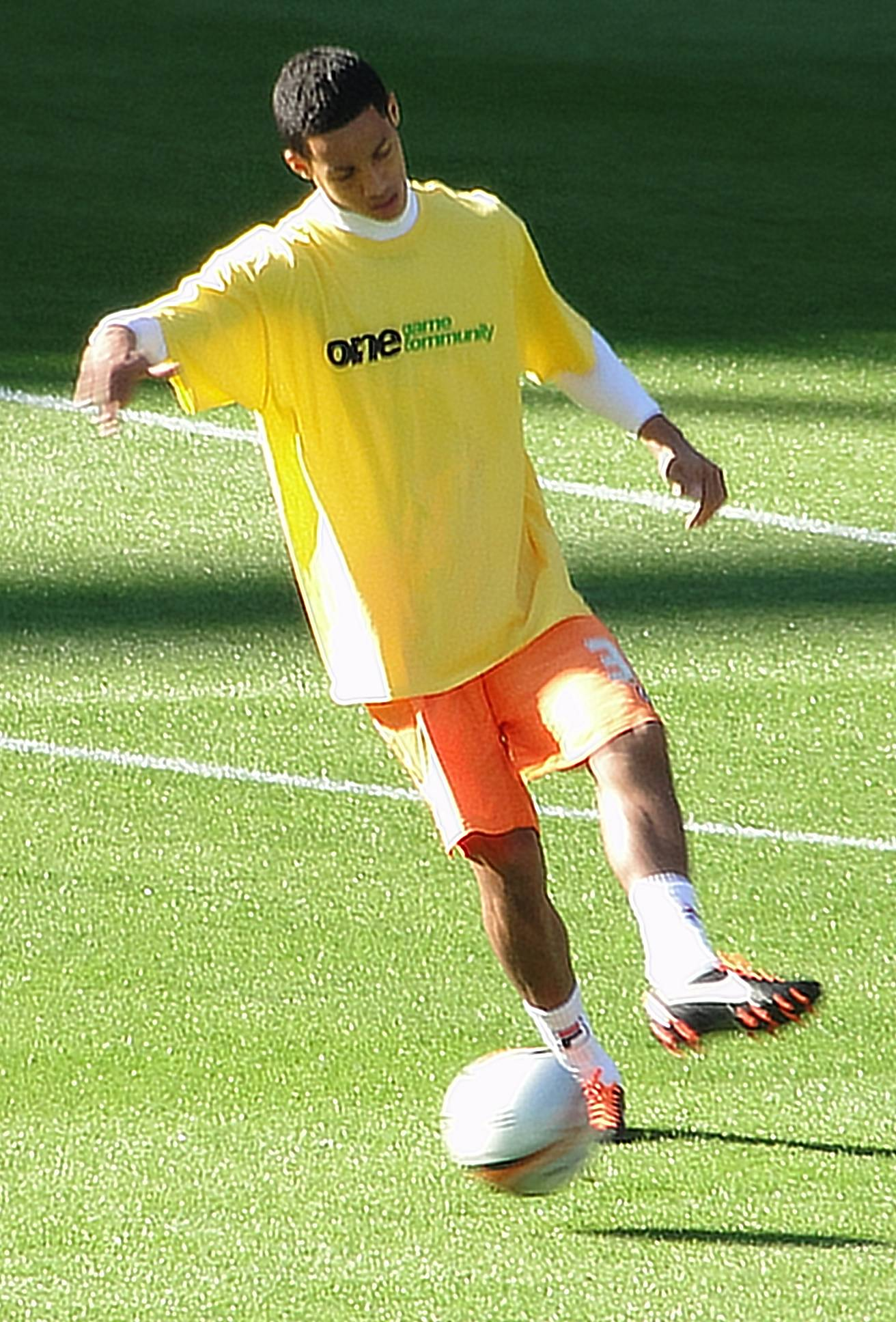
Ince warming up for Blackpool in 2011

On 3 August 2011, Ince signed a two-year contract with Blackpool, with an option for a third. As Ince was under 24 years of age and had been offered a new contract by his previous club, a compensation deal had to be agreed. Liverpool and Blackpool agreed an undisclosed fee and a sell-on clause which entitled Liverpool to 35% of any fee that Blackpool later received for selling Ince. As Blackpool had been relegated from the Premier League at the end of the 2010–11 season, Ince thus dropped down to the Championship to join the club, who were managed by Ian Holloway.

He made his Blackpool debut in the League Cup defeat to Sheffield Wednesday on 11 August 2011. He scored his first goals for Blackpool with both in a 2–1 win over Doncaster Rovers on 18 October 2011. On 25 February 2012 he scored another brace in a 3–1 away win against Bristol City. In the Championship play-off final at Wembley on 19 May 2012, he scored an equaliser against West Ham United but Blackpool lost the match 2–1.

The first League game of Blackpool's 2012–13 season, on 18 August 2012, saw Ince score the only goals of the game in a 2–0 win at Millwall. Following the game, manager Ian Holloway revealed that Blackpool had received an offer from an unknown club, but that Ince had committed his future to the Seasiders after talking to his father. Holloway stated, "There was interest in Tom last week. No one has heard about it but I'll share it with you. His dad wants him to stay with us." On 7 August, he scored twice in a 6–0 win against Ipswich Town. In September, he scored in back-to-back games against Barnsley and Middlesbrough. He scored his tenth goal of the season on 3 November, completing a run of scoring in four successive games. The previous day, Holloway left Blackpool to become the new manager of Crystal Palace. Michael Appleton was appointed to replace him. In December 2012, it was reported that Ince's form was attracting the attention of his former club Liverpool, who were preparing a bid of £4 million in the January transfer window. In January, Liverpool entered into negotiations with Blackpool, but The Seasiders' asking price of £8.5 million proved too much for Liverpool after they had already signed Daniel Sturridge and paid off Joe Cole's contract so they withdrew from talks. Reading made a late bid to sign him, offering a fee just below Blackpool's £8m valuation the transfer window closed with Ince still at Blackpool. On 11 January 2013, Appleton resigned to become manager of Blackburn Rovers. He was replaced by Ince's father Paul.

At the 2013 Football League Awards on 24 March, Ince won the award for The Football League Young Player of the Year. In April 2013, after Wilfried Zaha had moved from Crystal Palace to Manchester United for £15 million, and with Ince the fifth-top scorer in the Championship on 18 goals, Ince's father commented that Tom should be valued at £25 million. On 30 June 2013, Blackpool accepted what was believed to be an £8 million offer from Cardiff City. It was reported that Swansea City were also interested in signing Ince, but were put off by the asking price. Despite agreeing personal terms and passing a medical with Cardiff City, Ince turned down the move on 12 July to stay in Blackpool with his newborn child. Aston Villa and Everton were subsequently linked with him, but Ince chose to remain at Blackpool.

In his first ten league games of the 2013–14 season, Ince scored six goals as the team moved into fourth place in The Championship. However, he then went on a lean streak and scored just one goal in his next thirteen league matches, the equaliser in a 1–1 draw against Leeds United on 26 December 2013. In that month, Blackpool offered him a new contract, but chairman Karl Oyston expected that Ince would leave. On 18 January 2014, he played 90 minutes in a 2–0 away defeat at Barnsley. It was his last game for Blackpool. During his time at the club, Ince made 113 appearances, scoring 33 goals. Three days later, his father was sacked as manager. With negotiations undergoing for Ince's transfer away from Blackpool, he was left out of the squad for their matches against Doncaster on 25 January and Reading on 28 January.

=== Loan to Crystal Palace ===
In the January 2014 transfer window, numerous clubs approached Blackpool to enquire about signing Ince, who held talks with Everton, Cardiff, Newcastle, Hull City, Sunderland, Stoke City, Swansea City, Tottenham Hotspur, Crystal Palace and his former club Liverpool again. However, Ince once again spurned Liverpool's advances, believing that he was not ready to move to a club of their size. European clubs Ajax, Inter Milan and Paris Saint-Germain also revealed their interest and French club Monaco were reported to be leading the race to sign Ince on a free transfer in the summer. Ince and his father Paul met with representatives from Monaco in London on 16 January, just two days before Blackpool's 2–0 defeat to Barnsley, which was believed to be one of the reasons for his father being sacked as Blackpool manager.

His father's departure was reported to be likely to accelerate Ince's departure from Blackpool, with a domestic loan deal considered most likely as it would allow him the freedom of choice in the summer when his Blackpool contract had expired. A loan move to Crystal Palace, Stoke City, Swansea, Sunderland or Hull City was considered most likely, with the deal coming down to the size of the loan fee and what percentage of his wages was paid by the club loaning him out. On 30 January 2014, Ince signed for Premier League club Crystal Palace on loan for the remainder of the 2013–14 season for a loan fee of £1 million. Ince made his debut on 8 February 2014, playing 90 minutes and scoring the first of three goals for Crystal Palace on the day, in a 3–1 win against West Bromwich Albion.

Ince started the next two matches, a 2–0 defeat to Manchester United on 22 February and a 0–0 draw with Swansea City on 2 March, then came off the bench in a 1–0 defeat to Southampton on 8 March. He started against Sunderland on 15 March, a match that also ended 0–0, and then did not make another appearance for over a month. He was an unused substitute for the next six Premier League matches, as manager Tony Pulis preferred to play Yannick Bolasie and Jason Puncheon on the wings. He came off the bench in a 2–0 defeat to Manchester City on 27 April and in a 3–3 draw against Liverpool on 5 May before starting the final game of the season, a 2–2 draw with Fulham on 11 May.

=== Hull City ===
With his contract expiring at Blackpool and Ince unwilling to take up the option of a third year, clubs began to show an interest in signing him. Crystal Palace, Hull City, Newcastle United, Stoke City, Sunderland and Swansea City from the Premier League and European clubs Monaco, Olympiacos and Inter Milan all expressed a desire to sign him. He spent several days in Monaco and then Milan discussing a move but ultimately turned both Monaco and Inter Milan down. He said that "after lengthy discussions with my family I have decided that my immediate future in the game lies in the Premier League" although he "still had ambitions to one day play in Europe". In September 2015, he would go into more detail, saying that although there was "nothing better" than the lifestyle in Monaco, he "felt the league itself and the question 'would I get lost over there?' especially being English, put me off a little." Likewise, although the history and memories from his father's time at Inter Milan were attractive, the club was in a transitional period – "they weren't trying to challenge up at the top again, and it was a rebuilding process. Being a young lad, I didn't want any of that, I wanted to get in the Premier League."

After his contract expired at Blackpool, Ince transferred to Hull City on a free transfer in July 2014 and signed a two-year contract, with an agreement over compensation not initially made. After much negotiation, and with a decision by an independent tribunal looming, Hull and Blackpool settled in January 2015 on a figure of £1.6 million, rising to £2.3 million, dependent on appearances and if Hull avoided relegation. Due to the earlier sell-on clause Liverpool had negotiated with Blackpool, Liverpool received £560,000.

Ince came on as a substitute in both legs of Hull's Europa League third qualifying round tie against Slovak club AS Trenčín before making his league debut for the club on 16 August, playing 82 minutes of a 1–0 win away at Queens Park Rangers. He also came off the bench in both legs of the Europa League play-off round against Belgian side Sporting Lokeren; sandwiched between those matches, he started in a 1–1 draw against Stoke City on 24 August. He started again for the club in a 2–1 defeat to Aston Villa on 31 August, though he was withdrawn after 57 minutes. He went a month before appearing again for the club, playing 90 minutes and scoring in a 3–2 defeat to West Bromwich Albion on 24 September. He later said that manager Steve Bruce's change in tactics, to a more defensive approach, left him sidelined.

On 30 October 2014, having played in only three of Hull's nine league matches of the season thus far, Ince signed on loan with Championship side Nottingham Forest until 28 December. He made his debut the following day, playing the full 90 minutes as Nottingham Forest lost 3–0 to Huddersfield Town. Of the next seven matches, Ince made three starts and two substitute appearances before being recalled early by his parent club.

Ince was recalled to Hull on 22 December 2014, along with Maynor Figueroa from Wigan Athletic. He went straight back into the team, coming on as a late substitute in Hull's 3–1 win at Sunderland on Boxing Day. He came off the bench two days later in a 1–0 defeat to Leicester and then started against Arsenal in the FA Cup on 4 January, a match Hull lost 2–0. He came on in the 39th minute of Hull's 1–0 defeat away to West Bromwich Albion on 10 January and then went three weeks before playing again, coming off the bench in a 3–0 defeat to Newcastle on 31 January. That was to be his final appearance for The Tigers.

=== Derby County ===
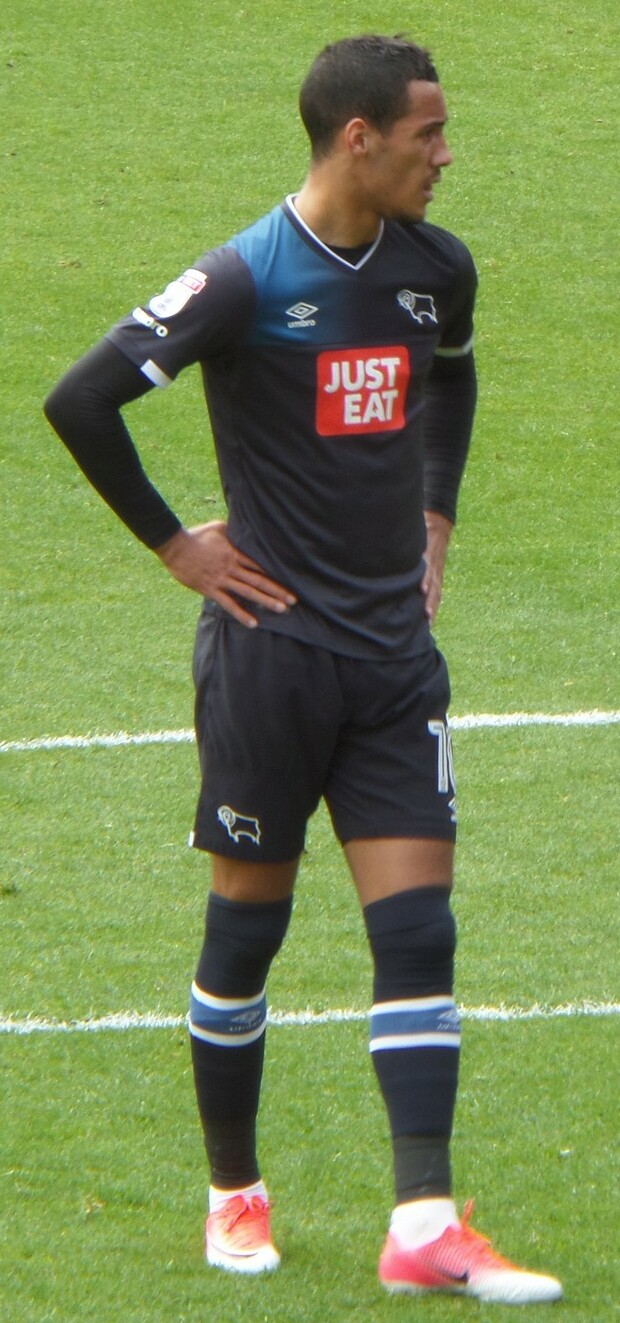
Ince playing for Derby County in 2017

On 2 February 2015, Ince joined Championship club Derby County on loan until the end of the season. Derby manager Steve McClaren said that signing a player of Ince's calibre was a "real coup" and that he was confident Ince would make an impact for The Rams. Five days later, Ince scored twice on his debut for Derby in a 4–1 win against Bolton Wanderers: a "superb" free kick into the top-left corner of Andy Lonergan's goal in the 39th minute and a "thunderous" shot from 12 yards in the 47th minute. He nearly bagged a hattrick, hitting the post in second-half stoppage time. Ince scored three more goals in his next two games: an emphatic finish in a 2–2 draw against Bournemouth on 10 February; and another brace in a 3–3 draw away to Rotherham United on 17 February, a fine curling finish into the top-right corner after jinking past several players and turning in a Craig Forsyth cross at the near post.

After scoring five goals in three matches, Ince declared himself "settled" at Derby, saying that he had "really found my feet and I'm feeling confident". The next four games saw more good performances for Ince but no goals: he hit the post, had a free kick "brilliantly" saved by Sheffield Wednesday keeper Keiren Westwood, narrowly curled an effort wide and won a penalty in a 3–2 win against Wednesday on 21 February; was a "constant threat" and placed a shot just wide in a 2–0 win against Charlton Athletic on 24 February; was twice denied by deflections late in the second half of a 2–0 defeat to Fulham on 28 February; and missed several chances in a 2–0 defeat to Brighton & Hove Albion on 3 March that saw Derby register 19 attempts at goal. Ince put Derby 2–0 up against Birmingham City on 7 March, slipping through two defenders and shooting low under Birmingham keeper Darren Randolph, though two late goals for The Blues saw them rescue a point, with the first coming from the penalty spot after Ince hauled down Robert Tesche. He only scored once in his next six games, this in a 2–2 draw at home to Watford on 3 April, before scoring four goals in his next three. The first was the second goal in a 4–0 rout of Blackpool on 14 April, a brace followed in a 4–4 draw against Huddersfield Town on 18 April and the last came in a 3–3 draw against Millwall on 25 April. He thus finished his spell at Derby with 11 goals in 18 matches. Of the 8 matches in which he scored, 6 of them finished in draws.

On 3 July 2015, Derby County signed Ince on a four-year contract for £4.75 million, with Ince briefly becoming the club's most-expensive signing. His record was surpassed less than one month later as the club bought midfielder Bradley Johnson from Norwich City for £6 million. The sale of Ince was reported to have left Hull manager Steve Bruce livid, with Bruce saying that he "wouldn't have sold Tom and I did all I could to keep him... we shouldn't be selling our top young players when trying to put together a team to challenge for an immediate return to the Premier League. I saw Tom as an integral part of my plans. But Derby met the buy-out clause and then it was the choice of others [at Hull] to let him leave." Ince started all of Derby's first eight league matches, also coming on as a substitute in the club's 2–1 League Cup defeat to Portsmouth on 12 August. His first goal arrived on 15 September, the only goal against Reading at the Madejski Stadium. He missed the next match, a 0–0 draw at home to Burnley on 21 September, with a minor training ground injury. On his return to the starting XI away to newly promoted Milton Keynes Dons on 26 September, Ince provided a 90th minute assist for Darren Bent and scored in the 96th minute to seal a 3–1 win for The Rams. Ince made it three goals in three games on 3 October, grabbing the second in a 2–0 win against Brentford. He started the next three League matches, against Wolves on 18 October, Blackburn Rovers on 21 October and against Huddersfield Town on 24 October but was taken off in the 26th minute of the latter match. He had injured his ankle but it was not as bad as first feared and although he missed the next two League matches against Rotherham United and QPR, he returned to the team for the East Midlands derby against his former club Nottingham Forest on 6 November.

On 15 December, Ince scored his first professional hat-trick in a 4–0 win against Bristol City. The first was a low finish past City keeper Frank Fielding in the 42nd minute after a mazy run through three defenders; then he intercepted the ball inside his own half and ran through on goal before firing a shot under Fielding in the 63rd minute; his third in the 71st minute was drilled into the bottom corner after a combination with Darren Bent. The result moved Derby up to third in the table and manager Paul Clement praised Ince, saying that "he's been a little bit inconsistent by his standards so far this season so it was a very good performance from him and will be brilliant for his confidence." Ince scored again in the next match, the only goal in a 1–0 win at home to Ipswich Town on 19 December. His man-of-the-match performance also saw him provide three good chances, for teammates Bradley Johnson, Chris Martin and Johnny Russell, as well as have a 25-yard free-kick saved by Ipswich goalie Dean Gerken. He missed two good opportunities in the next match, a 2–0 win over Fulham on Boxing Day, but atoned against fierce rivals Leeds United on 29 December. He came on in the 76th minute with Derby 2–1 down, scoring a "brilliant" equaliser just two minutes later, drilling a "fine finish" into the bottom corner.

Ince then endured a difficult spell, not scoring in his next twelve league and cup appearances. After the first seven appearances, during which Derby lost five times, drew twice, only scored three goals and sacked manager Paul Clement, he lost his place in the starting line-up. This coincided with a return to form for the team, who won two of their next three matches, with Ince making second-half substitute appearances. He was restored to the starting eleven on 5 March for a 2–0 win against Huddersfield Town and ended his barren spell two matches later on 12 March, scoring a brace either side of a Chris Martin goal to give The Rams a 3–0 lead against Rotherham United. However, three late Rotherham goals saw the away side rescue a point. Ince rounded out the season with two more goals: the second in a 4–1 thrashing of Bolton Wanderers on 9 April and the 57th-minute winner in a 3–2 victory at Bristol City on 19 April. Derby finished the season in fifth place and played fourth-placed Hull City in the play-off semi-finals, losing 3–0 at home and winning 2–0 away to go out 3–2 on aggregate to the eventual play-off final winners. Ince did not score his first goal of the 2016–17 season until 27 September, the first in a 2–0 win at Cardiff City. In November, he scored four goals in back-to-back games: braces each in a 3–2 win at Wolves on 5 November and in a 3–0 win over Rotherham on 19 November. Ince ended the 2016–17 season as top scorer with 15 goals as the Rams finished in 9th position.

=== Huddersfield Town ===
On 4 July 2017, Ince signed for newly promoted Premier League club Huddersfield Town on an initial three-year contract for an undisclosed fee. He scored his first goal with the club in the Premier League on 26 December during a 1–1 draw with Stoke City. Ince played 37 times in 2017–18 season helping the Terriers avoid relegation, finishing in 16th position.

=== Stoke City ===
Ince signed for newly relegated Championship club Stoke City on 24 July 2018 on a four-year contract for an initial fee of £10 million, which could rise to £12 million with add-ons. He made his Stoke debut on 5 August 2018 against Leeds United. Ince played 41 times for Stoke in the 2018–19 season, scoring six goals as the Potters finished in a mid-table position of 16th. Stoke and Ince began the 2019–20 season in poor form as the team struggled under the management of Nathan Jones. Despite a change of manager, Ince continued to struggle to have an impact on the team and came in for heavy criticism after an anonymous performance against Wigan Athletic 30 June 2020 where he completed just one pass in 57 minutes. He scored in the next match a 4–0 win against Barnsley. He ended the campaign with three goals from 40 appearances as Stoke avoided relegation and finished in 15th position.

On 1 February 2021, Ince joined Luton Town on loan for the remainder of the 2020–21 season. Five days later, he made his debut for the Hatters as a substitute for Harry Cornick in a 1–1 home league draw against Huddersfield Town. Ince made seven appearances for the Hatters before he suffered an ankle ligament injury.

On 31 January 2022, Ince joined Reading on loan for the remainder of the 2021–22 season. Ince played 15 times for the Royals, scoring twice against Bournemouth and Swansea City.

Ince was released by Stoke City at the end of the 2021–22 season.

=== Reading ===
On 21 June 2022, Ince signed a three-year contract with Reading, which his father Paul had become manager of in the close season. On 25 February 2023, Ince scored a brace against his former club Blackpool in a 3–1 home win.

=== Watford ===
On 27 June 2023, after their relegation to League One, Reading confirmed Ince's departure to Watford for an undisclosed fee thought to be £50,000.

On 13 August 2024, Ince provided a hat-trick and an assist in a 5–0 win against MK Dons in the EFL Cup. Despite being picked only intermittently during much of his spell at Watford, with many of his appearances being as a late substitute, Ince became a regular starter after Javi Gracia's appointment as Head Coach in October 2025, scoring his second hat-trick for the club on 1 January 2026.

On 22 May 2026, the club said it was releasing the player.

=== Tranmere Rovers ===
On 27 July 2026, Ince joined League Two club Tranmere Rovers on a two-year deal. Ahead of the 2026–27 season, he was named vice-captain by manager Darrell Clarke.

== International career ==
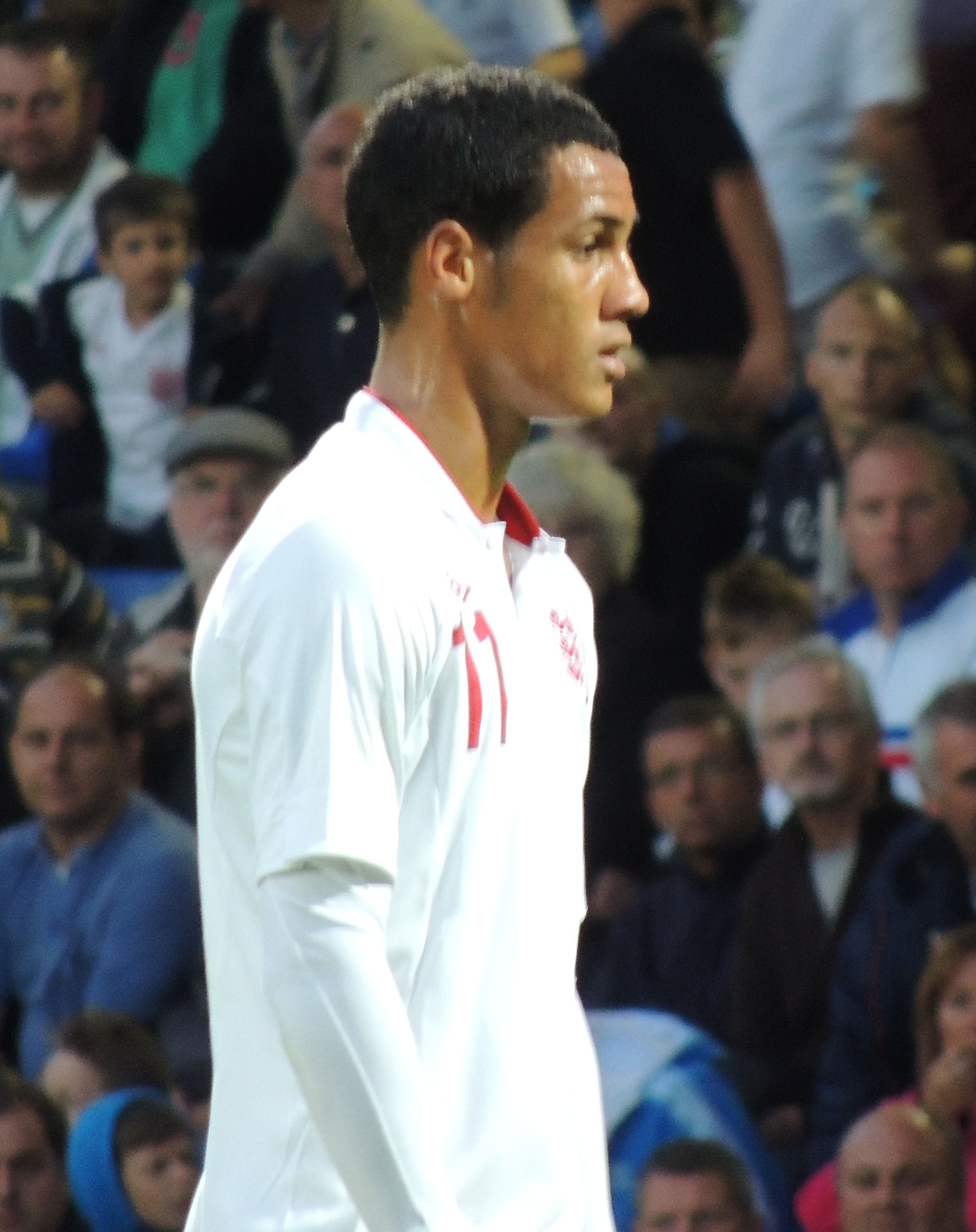
Ince playing for England U21 in 2012

Ince made four appearances for England Under-17s in 2009 and another four for the Under 19s in 2011. On 29 August 2012 he was called up to the Under 21 squad by manager Stuart Pearce for the European Championship qualifying games against Azerbaijan on 1 September and Norway four days later. He made his under-21 debut in the 2–0 win over Azerbaijan at Dalga Arena, Baku.

On 5 February 2013, he scored his first goals for the under-21 side, scoring twice in a 4–0 win against Sweden in Walsall. In March 2015, he ruled himself out of selection for future under-21 squads. This caused a great deal of controversy, which shocked Ince.

"Bear in mind I had been playing for the U21s for the past three years, had 20–25 caps, played in the [2013] European Championship under Stuart Pearce. I was 23, and the oldest one there by a good 18 months. I felt at the time I hadn't really played a lot of club football, and I'd been getting banded from pillar to post, and needed a summer off to settle down, and plan my next move. The next move was a vital one... it is time to be kicking on. I went to Croatia in the play-offs to qualify [for the 2015 under-21 championships], and I was on the bench. I made the decision and it was time to move on. Like everything in life, in any job, you get that feeling the time is right to move on." – Ince on his decision to rule himself out of consideration for the England under-21s.

== Style of play ==
Ince is left-footed and began his career as a left winger. However, when he joined Blackpool, he was often deployed on the right, either as a winger or an inside forward, cutting in on his favoured left foot. He has also played more centrally as an attacking midfielder or forward. Ince's main attributes are his pace, acceleration and skill on the ball. He has said that he enjoys "exciting people, scoring goals, creating goals" and is "not one of those old fashioned wingers who just gets crosses in, I like to create things, show bits of magic."

== Career statistics ==
As of match played 1 August 2026

Appearances and goals by club, season and competition
Club	Season	League			FA Cup		League Cup		Other		Total	
Club	Season	Division	Apps	Goals	Apps	Goals	Apps	Goals	Apps	Goals	Apps	Goals
Liverpool	2010–11	Premier League	0	0	—		1	0	0	0	1	0
Notts County (loan)	2010–11	League One	6	2	2	0	—		—		8	2
Blackpool	2011–12	Championship	33	6	4	1	1	0	3 (Note: Appearances in Championship play-offs)	1	41	8
Blackpool	2012–13	Championship	44	18	2	0	1	0	—		47	18
Blackpool	2013–14	Championship	23	7	1	0	1	0	—		25	7
Blackpool	Total		100	31	7	1	3	0	3	1	113	33
Crystal Palace (loan)	2013–14	Premier League	8	1	—		—		—		8	1
Hull City	2014–15	Premier League	7	0	1	0	1	1	4 (Note: Appearances in UEFA Europa League)	0	13	1
Nottingham Forest (loan)	2014–15	Championship	6	0	—		—		—		6	0
Derby County (loan)	2014–15	Championship	18	11	—		—		—		18	11
Derby County	2015–16	Championship	42	12	1	0	1	0	2	0	46	12
Derby County	2016–17	Championship	45	14	2	1	3	0	—		50	15
Derby County	Total		87	26	3	1	4	0	2	0	96	27
Huddersfield Town	2017–18	Premier League	33	2	2	1	2	0	—		37	3
Stoke City	2018–19	Championship	38	6	2	0	1	0	—		41	6
Stoke City	2019–20	Championship	38	3	1	0	1	0	—		40	3
Stoke City	2020–21	Championship	7	0	0	0	0	0	—		7	0
Stoke City	2021–22	Championship	11	3	1	1	3	1	—		15	5
Stoke City	Total		94	12	4	1	5	1	0	0	103	14
Luton Town (loan)	2020–21	Championship	7	0	0	0	0	0	—		7	0
Reading (loan)	2021–22	Championship	15	2	0	0	0	0	—		15	2
Reading	2022–23	Championship	38	9	1	0	0	0	—		39	9
Watford	2023–24	Championship	27	2	2	0	0	0	—		29	2
Watford	2024–25	Championship	32	1	1	0	3	4	—		36	5
Watford	2025–26	Championship	27	4	0	0	1	0	—		28	4
Watford	Total		86	7	3	0	4	4	0	0	93	11
Tranmere Rovers	2026–27	League Two	2	1	0	0	1	0	0	0	3	1
Career total			505	103	23	4	21	6	9	1	558	114

== Honours ==
Individual

- PFA Team of the Year: 2012–13 Championship
- Football League Young Player of the Year: 2012–13
- Football League Championship Player of the Month: August 2012, April 2015
