= 2026–27 Tranmere Rovers F.C. season =

143rd season in existence of Tranmere Rovers FC

Tranmere Rovers
2026–27 season
- Owner: Mark and Nicola Palios
- Chairman: Mark Palios
- Manager: Darrell Clarke
- Stadium: Prenton Park

The 2026–27 season is the 143rd season in the history of Tranmere Rovers Football Club and their seventh consecutive season in League Two. In addition to the domestic league, the club would also participate in the FA Cup, the EFL Cup, and the EFL Trophy.

== Managerial changes ==
Prior to the season starting, Darrell Clarke was appointed as manager on a two-year contract.

== Transfers and contracts ==
=== In ===
Date	Pos.	Player	From	Fee	Ref.
29 June 2026	RB	(England) Joel Senior	(England) Bristol Rovers	Free	
1 July 2026 (Note: The transfer was announced on 25 June, and would become official on July 1 once Conlon's contract at Oldham Athletic expired.)	CM	(England) Tom Conlon	(England) Oldham Athletic	Free	
1 July 2026 (Note: The transfer was announced on 25 June, and would become official on July 1 once Slater's contract at Brighton & Hove Albion expired.)	LB	(Republic of Ireland) Jacob Slater	(England) Brighton & Hove Albion	Free	
21 July 2026	CM	(Wales) Jordan Davies	(England) Fleetwood Town	Free	
27 July 2026	RW	(England) Tom Ince	(England) Watford	Free	
27 July 2026	CB	(England) Jack McEvilly	(England) Burnley	Free	
27 July 2026	LB	(England) Oliver Scott	(England) Aldershot Town	Free	
27 July 2026	CM	(England) Charlie Veevers	(England) Burnley	Free	
28 July 2026	GK	(England) Harrison Male	(England) York City	Free	
30 July 2026	CF	(England) Courtney Baker-Richardson	(Wales) Newport County	Free	
3 August 2026	CDM	(Wales) Will Vaulks	(England) Oxford United	Free transfer	

=== Loaned in ===
Date	Pos.	Player	From	Loaned until	Ref.
16 July 2026	CB	(England) Bobby Faulkner	(England) Doncaster Rovers	End of Season	
21 July 2026	RW	(United States) Zane Okoro	(England) Lincoln City	End of Season	
28 August 2026	CF	(England) Dylan Jones	(England) Norwich City	End of Season	
1 September 2026	CF	(England) David Kamara	(England) Peterborough United	End of Season	
1 September 2026	CB	(Wales) George Nevett	(England) Peterborough United	End of Season	

=== Loaned out ===
Date	Pos.	Player	To	Loaned until	Ref.
14 August 2026	CM	(Wales) Josh Williams	(Wales) Colwyn Bay	2 January 2027	
15 October 2026	CF	(England) Sam Mann	(England) 1874 Northwich	20 December 2026 (Note: On 20 November, Mann's initial one-month loan at 1874 Northwich was extended by one month.)	
30 October 2026	CB	(England) Jack McEvilly	(England) Clitheroe	30 November 2026	
20 November 2026	CF	(England) Courtney Baker-Richardson	(England) Altrincham	20 December 2026	

=== Out ===
Date	Pos.	Player	To	Fee	Ref.
10 July 2026	CDM	(Liberia) Nohan Kenneh	(Israel) Maccabi Akhi Nazareth	Free transfer	

=== Released / out of contract ===
Date	Pos.	Player	Subsequent club	Joined date	Ref.
30 June 2026	CF	(England) Josh Davison	(England) Shrewsbury Town	1 July 2026	
30 June 2026	RB	(England) Cameron Norman	(Wales) Newport County	1 July 2026	
30 June 2026	CF	(England) Harvey Saunders	(England) Northampton Town	1 July 2026	
30 June 2026	CDM	(England) Richard Smallwood	(England) Bristol Rovers	1 July 2026	
30 June 2026	CF	(England) Kristian Dennis	(England) Altrincham	1 July 2026	
30 June 2026	RW	(England) Samuel Taylor	(England) Altrincham	1 July 2026	
30 June 2026	CF	(Jersey) Sol Solomon	(England) Southport	1 July 2026	
30 June 2026	LW	(England) Omari Patrick	(England) Forest Green Rovers	22 July 2026	
30 June 2026	CB	(England) Aaron McGowan	(England) Port Vale	31 July 2026	
30 June 2026	LB	(Saint Kitts and Nevis) Ethan Bristow	(England) Harrogate Town	8 August 2026	
30 June 2026	LW	(England) Kaiyne Woolery	(Republic of Ireland) Sligo Rovers	13 August 2026	
30 June 2026	CDM	(England) Jason Lowe			

=== New Contract ===
Date	Pos.	Player	Contract expiry	Ref.
11 May 2026	CM	(England) Sam Finley	30 June 2027	
29 June 2026 (Note: The contract was announced on 29 June, and would become officially commence on July 1.)	CF	(England) Sam Mann	Undisclosed (Note: First professional contract)	
15 September 2026	CDM	(England) Ryan Watson	31 December 2026	

== Pre-season and friendlies ==
On 19 June, Tranmere announced a home pre-season friendly against Blackpool.

Win Draw Loss Fixtures

11 July 2026 Friendly	Tranmere Rovers	3–0	Bootle	Wallasey
12:00 BST	Whitaker; Trialist; Trialist	Report		Stadium: Solar Campus; Attendance: 0 (BCD)

18 July 2026 Friendly	Tranmere Rovers	2–0	Blackpool	Birkenhead
15:00 BST	Whitaker 32'; Davies 54'	Report		Stadium: Prenton Park

24 July 2026 Friendly	Tranmere Rovers	3–0	Professional Footballers' Association	Wallasey
11:00 BST	Okoro; Ironside; Trialist	Report		Stadium: Solar Campus; Attendance: 0 (BCD)

28 July 2026 Friendly	Tranmere Rovers	1–3	Altrincham	Wallasey
11:00 BST	Trialist 9'	Report	Barnes 5'; Crawford 16'; Barlow 21'	Stadium: Solar Campus; Attendance: 0 (BCD)

7 August 2026 Friendly	Manchester City U21	2–2	Tranmere Rovers	Manchester
12:00 BST		Report	Vaulks 54'; Ince 65'	Stadium: Joie Stadium; Attendance: 0 (BCD)

== Competitions ==
=== League Two ===
==== League table ====
Pos	Team	Pld	W	D	L	GF	GA	GD	Pts
8	Exeter City	16	6	5	5	13	10	+3	23
9	Newport County	16	5	7	4	24	19	+5	22
10	Tranmere Rovers	16	5	7	4	21	19	+2	22
11	Gillingham	16	5	6	5	23	24	−1	21
12	Cheltenham Town	16	6	3	7	23	29	−6	21

Updated to match(es) played on 21 November 2026. Source: EFL Official Website
Rules for classification: 1) Points; 2) Goal difference; 3) Number of goals scored; 4) Head-to-head results; 5) Wins; 6) Away goals; 7) Penalty points (sec 9.5); 8) 12-point sending off offences

==== Results summary ====
Overall								Home						Away					
Pld	W	D	L	GF	GA	GD	Pts	W	D	L	GF	GA	GD	W	D	L	GF	GA	GD
16	5	7	4	21	19	+2	22	4	3	1	14	8	+6	1	4	3	7	11	−4

Last updated: 21 November 2026.
Source: Soccerway

==== Results by round ====
Round	1	2	3	4	5	6	7	8	9	10	11	12	13	14	15	16	17	18	19	20	21	22	23	24	25	26	27	28	29	30	31
Ground	H	A	A	H	H	A	A	H	A	H	H	A	A	H	A	H	A	H	H	A	H	A	A	H	A	H	H	A	H	A	A
Result	W	D	D	D	W	L	D	D	L	D	L	W	D	W	L	W															
Position	5	4	8	10	4	10	10	10	12	13	17	13	13	11	15	10															
Points	3	4	5	6	9	9	10	11	11	12	12	15	16	19	19	22															

Source: EFL
A = Away; H = Home; W = Win; D = Draw; L = Loss; P = Postponed

==== Matches ====
On 25 June, the League Two fixtures were revealed.

Win Draw Loss Fixtures

15 August 2026 1	Tranmere Rovers	2–0	Shrewsbury Town	Birkenhead
15:00 BST	Davies 35'; Whitaker 63', (yellow card) 87'; Senior (yellow card) 76'; Okoro (yellow card) 90+1'	Report	Davison (yellow card) 80'; England (yellow card) 87'	Stadium: Prenton Park; Attendance: 7,826 (1,421 away); Referee: Jamie O'Connor

22 August 2026 2	Port Vale	1–1	Tranmere Rovers	Burslem
15:00 BST	Dempsey (yellow card) 5'; Byers 18' (pen.); Garrity (yellow card) 86'	Report	Smith (yellow card) 68'; Ince 72'; Ironside (yellow card) 79'; Finley (yellow card) 90+10'	Stadium: Vale Park; Attendance: 8,668; Referee: Declan Brown

29 August 2026 3	Newport County	2–2	Tranmere Rovers	Newport
15:00 BST	Gwengwe 11', 90'; Doidge (yellow card) 43'; Dibley-Dias (yellow card) 84'	Report	Slater (yellow card) 15'; Okoro 71'; Ince (yellow card) 73'; Jones 75'	Stadium: Rodney Parade; Attendance: 4,606 (458 away); Referee: Emily Heaslip

1 September 2026 4	Tranmere Rovers	2–2	Rotherham United	Birkenhead
19:45 BST	Okoro 16'; Faulkner (yellow card) 74' (red card) 90+4'; Ince 87'; Davies (yellow card) 90+5'; McGee (yellow card) 90+6'	Report	Otoo (yellow card) 34'; Aljofree (yellow card) 69'; Nemane 84'; Bradshaw 90+6' (pen.)	Stadium: Prenton Park; Attendance: 6,137; Referee: Martin Woods

5 September 2026 5	Tranmere Rovers	2–0	Oldham Athletic	Birkenhead
15:00 BST	Jones 17'; Slater (yellow card) 43'; McGee (yellow card) 79'; Ironside 82' (pen.); Ince (yellow card) 90'	Report	Norburn (yellow card) 8'; Robson (yellow card) 11'	Stadium: Prenton Park; Referee: Seb Stockbridge

12 September 2026 6	Gillingham	2–0	Tranmere Rovers	Gillingham
15:00 BST	McKenzie (yellow card) 26'; King (yellow card) 35'; Dobbs 68'; Hale 80'; McManus (yellow card) 86'	Report	Smith (yellow card) 31'; Vaulks (yellow card) 89'	Stadium: MEMS Priestfield Stadium; Attendance: 5,611 (349 away); Referee: Alan Young

19 September 2026 7	Exeter City	0–0	Tranmere Rovers	Exeter
15:00 BST	Gordon (yellow card) 45'; James (yellow card) 52'	Report	Smith (yellow card) 30'; Jones (yellow card) 65'; Slater (yellow card) 75'	Stadium: St James Park; Attendance: 6,158 (530 away); Referee: Isaac Searle

26 September 2026 8	Tranmere Rovers	1–1	Walsall	Birkenhead
15:00 BST	Ironside (penalty missed) 35'; Faulkner 73'	Report	Sprangler (yellow card) 18'; Connolly (yellow card) 35'; Smith 90+1'	Stadium: Prenton Park; Attendance: 7,229 (802 away); Referee: Stephen Parkinson

3 October 2026 9	Chesterfield	4–2	Tranmere Rovers	Whittington Moor
12:30 BST	Markanday 15'; Bonis (yellow card) 21'; McEachran (yellow card) 54'; McFadzean (yellow card) 79'; Marsh 83'; Koroma 85', 90+1'	Report	Conlon (yellow card) 18'; Ironside (yellow card) 41'; Senior (yellow card) 57'; Jones 59'; Slater 90+4'	Stadium: SMH Group Stadium; Attendance: 8,186 (795 away); Referee: Thomas Parsons
Note: Fixture was initially scheduled for a 15:00 kick-off, but was brought forward for live Sky Sports.

10 October 2026 10	Tranmere Rovers	1–1	Rochdale	Birkenhead
15:00 BST	Conlon 15'		Brown 57'; Adebayo-Rowling (yellow card) 90+1'	Stadium: Prenton Park; Attendance: 7,062; Referee: Sunny Singh Gill

17 October 2026 11	Tranmere Rovers	1–2	Barnet	Birkenhead
15:00 BST	Vaulks 22', (yellow card) 71'; Senior (yellow card) 51' (red card) 90+2'	Report	Williams (yellow card) 20'; Tshimanga 55', 87' (pen.); Kanu (yellow card) 70'	Stadium: Prenton Park; Referee: Jamie Robinson

20 October 2026 12	Northampton Town	0–1	Tranmere Rovers	Northampton
19:45 BST		Report	Faulkner 37'; Watson (yellow card) 42'; O'Connor (yellow card) 90+1'	Stadium: Sixfields Stadium; Attendance: 4,918; Referee: Aaron Jackson

24 October 2026 13	Crawley Town	1–1	Tranmere Rovers	Crawley
15:00 BST	Jennings (yellow card) 32'; Morgan 52'	Report	Vaulks 60', (yellow card) 76'; Ince (yellow card) 67'	Stadium: Broadfield Stadium; Attendance: 3,140; Referee: Lewis Sandoe

31 October 2026 14	Tranmere Rovers	3–1	Cheltenham Town	Birkenhead
15:00 GMT	Jones 23', 39'; Turnbull (yellow card) 45+1'; Whitaker 45+3'; Conlon (yellow card) 60'	Report	McCann 1'; Evans (yellow card) 32'; Tomkinson (yellow card) 78'	Stadium: Prenton Park; Attendance: 6,110; Referee: Ross Martin

14 November 2026 15	Fleetwood Town	1–0	Tranmere Rovers	Fleetwood
17:30 GMT	Potter (yellow card) 42'; Rooney 82'	Report	Nevett (yellow card) 45+1'	Stadium: Highbury Stadium; Attendance: 3,459 (1,089 away); Referee: Paul Howard

21 November 2026 16	Tranmere Rovers	2–1	Colchester United	Birkenhead
15:00 GMT	Ince 27'; Slater (yellow card) 52'; Jones 90'	Report	Raggett 42'; Williams (yellow card) 66'	Stadium: Prenton Park; Attendance: 5,894 (200 away); Referee: Harrison Blair

28 November 2026 17	Bristol Rovers	v	Tranmere Rovers	Horfield
15:00 GMT				Stadium: Memorial Stadium

5 December 2026 18	Tranmere Rovers	v	Salford City	Birkenhead
15:00 GMT				Stadium: Prenton Park
Note: Fixture was initially scheduled for 1 December, but was pushed back four-days due to both clubs agreeing to enable more fans to attend.

12 December 2026 19	Tranmere Rovers	v	York City	Birkenhead
15:00 GMT				Stadium: Prenton Park

19 December 2026 20	Swindon Town	v	Tranmere Rovers	Swindon
15:00 GMT				Stadium: County Ground

26 December 2026 21	Tranmere Rovers	v	Accrington Stanley	Birkenhead
15:00 GMT				Stadium: Prenton Park

29 December 2026 22	Crewe Alexandra	v	Tranmere Rovers	Crewe
19:45 GMT				Stadium: Mornflake Stadium

1 January 2027 23	Grimsby Town	v	Tranmere Rovers	Cleethorpes
15:00 GMT				Stadium: Blundell Park

9 January 2027 24	Tranmere Rovers	v	Swindon Town	Birkenhead
15:00 GMT				Stadium: Prenton Park

16 January 2027 25	Barnet	v	Tranmere Rovers	Edgware
15:00 GMT				Stadium: The Hive Stadium

19 January 2027 26	Tranmere Rovers	v	Northampton Town	Birkenhead
19:45 GMT				Stadium: Prenton Park

23 January 2027 27	Tranmere Rovers	v	Crawley Town	Birkenhead
15:00 GMT				Stadium: Prenton Park

30 January 2027 28	Cheltenham Town	v	Tranmere Rovers	Cheltenham
15:00 GMT				Stadium: EV Charger Points Stadium

6 February 2027 29	Tranmere Rovers	v	Newport County	Birkenhead
12:30 GMT				Stadium: Prenton Park
Note: Fixture was initially scheduled for a 15:00 kick-off, but was brought forward for live Sky Sports broadcasting.

9 February 2027 30	Rotherham United	v	Tranmere Rovers	Rotherham
19:45 GMT				Stadium: AESSEAL New York Stadium

13 February 2027 31	Oldham Athletic	v	Tranmere Rovers	Oldham
12:30 GMT				Stadium: Boundary Park
Note: Fixture was initially scheduled for a 15:00 kick-off, but was brought forward for live Sky Sports broadcasting.

=== FA Cup ===
Tranmere were drawn away to Barnet in the first round.

Win Draw Loss Fixtures

7 November 2026 First round	Barnet	3–0	Tranmere Rovers	Edgware
15:00 GMT	Smith 80'; Ofoborh 90'; Ajayi 90+6'	Report	Turnbull (yellow card) 36'; Scott (yellow card) 39'; Whitaker (yellow card) 76'	Stadium: The Hive Stadium; Attendance: 1,615 (361 away); Referee: Carl Brook

=== EFL Cup ===
Tranmere were drawn at home to Rochdale in the preliminary round.

Win Draw Loss Fixtures

1 August 2026 Preliminary round	Tranmere Rovers	2–2 (1–2 p)	Rochdale	Birkenhead
15:00 BST	Whitaker 4', (yellow card) 87'; Senior (yellow card) 42'; Davies (yellow card) 53', (goal) 60'	Report	East 11'; Silcott-Duberry 85'	Stadium: Prenton Park; Referee: Oliver Mackey
	Penalties
	Davies (penalty scored); Okoro (penalty missed); Ince (penalty missed); Whitaker (penalty missed); Baker-Richardson (penalty missed)		Dieseruvwe (penalty missed); Ebanks-Landell (penalty missed); Francis (penalty scored); Silcott-Duberry (penalty scored)

=== EFL Trophy ===
==== Group stage ====
Tranmere were drawn against Stockport County, Shrewsbury Town and Everton U21 in the Northern Group E.

Pos	Div	Team	Pld	W	PW	PL	L	GF	GA	GD	Pts	Qualification
1	L1	Stockport County (A)	3	2	1	0	0	8	3	+5	8	Advance to Round 2
2	L2	Tranmere Rovers (A)	2	1	0	1	0	1	0	+1	4	Advance to Round 2
3	L2	Shrewsbury Town (E)	3	1	0	0	2	2	4	−2	3	
4	ACA	Everton U21 (E)	2	0	0	0	2	4	8	−4	0	

Updated to match(es) played on 10 November 2026. Source: EFL
(A) Advances to a further round; (E) Eliminated

Win Draw Loss Fixtures

22 September 2026 Group stage	Tranmere Rovers	1–0	Shrewsbury Town	Birkenhead
19:00 BST	Scott (yellow card) 50'; Jones 69'	Report	Anderson (yellow card) 42'; Jude-Boyd (yellow card) 65'; Gray (yellow card) 90+2'	Stadium: Prenton Park; Attendance: 1,339 (74 away); Referee: Paul Marsden

10 November 2026 Group stage	Stockport County	0–0 (4–3 p)	Tranmere Rovers	Edgeley
19:00 GMT	Ilara (yellow card) 65'	Report		Stadium: Edgeley Park; Attendance: 1,587; Referee: Dale Baines
	Penalties
	Glover (penalty scored); Bailey (penalty scored); Huddleston (penalty scored); Gardner (penalty missed); Jobe (penalty scored)		Watson (penalty missed); Nevett (penalty scored); Mann (penalty missed); Brough (penalty scored); Veevers (penalty scored)

24 November 2026 Group stage	Tranmere Rovers	v	Everton U21	Birkenhead
19:00 GMT				Stadium: Prenton Park

== Statistics ==
=== Appearances and goals ===
As of match played 21 November 2026

Players with no appearances are not included on the list; italics indicate loaned in player

No.	Pos	Nat	Player	Total		League Two		FA Cup		EFL Cup		EFL Trophy	
No.	Pos	Nat	Player	Apps	Goals	Apps	Goals	Apps	Goals	Apps	Goals	Apps	Goals
1	GK	(England) ENG	Luke McGee	10	0	9+0	0	1+0	0	0+0	0	0+0	0
2	DF	(England) ENG	Joel Senior	17	0	15+0	0	0+1	0	1+0	0	0+0	0
3	DF	(Republic of Ireland) IRL	Jacob Slater	18	1	14+1	1	0+1	0	1+0	0	0+1	0
4	DF	(England) ENG	Jordan Turnbull	9	0	3+3	0	1+0	0	1+0	0	1+0	0
5	DF	(England) ENG	Nathan Smith	15	0	10+2	0	1+0	0	1+0	0	1+0	0
6	MF	(Wales) WAL	Will Vaulks	17	2	16+0	2	1+0	0	0+0	0	0+0	0
7	MF	(England) ENG	Charlie Whitaker	17	3	13+2	2	1+0	0	1+0	1	0+0	0
8	MF	(England) ENG	Sam Finley	10	0	2+7	0	0+0	0	1+0	0	0+0	0
9	FW	(England) ENG	Joe Ironside	18	1	13+3	1	1+0	0	1+0	0	0+0	0
10	FW	(England) ENG	Tom Ince	17	3	15+0	3	1+0	0	0+1	0	0+0	0
11	MF	(England) ENG	Tom Conlon	17	1	13+2	1	1+0	0	1+0	0	0+0	0
12	GK	(England) ENG	Harrison Male	8	0	7+0	0	0+0	0	1+0	0	0+0	0
13	GK	(Jamaica) JAM	Coniah Boyce-Clarke	2	0	0+0	0	0+0	0	0+0	0	2+0	0
14	DF	(England) ENG	Olly Scott	3	0	0+0	0	1+0	0	0+0	0	2+0	0
15	MF	(Wales) WAL	Jordan Davies	7	2	3+3	1	0+0	0	1+0	1	0+0	0
16	DF	(England) ENG	Bobby Faulkner	16	2	12+1	2	0+1	0	0+1	0	0+1	0
17	FW	(United States) USA	Zane Okoro	11	2	6+3	2	0+0	0	0+1	0	0+1	0
19	FW	(England) ENG	Courtney Baker-Richardson	5	0	0+2	0	0+0	0	0+1	0	2+0	0
20	MF	(England) ENG	Charlie Veevers	6	0	0+4	0	0+0	0	0+0	0	2+0	0
22	DF	(Republic of Ireland) IRL	Lee O'Connor	11	0	3+4	0	1+0	0	1+0	0	2+0	0
23	DF	(England) ENG	Patrick Brough	6	0	2+2	0	0+0	0	0+0	0	2+0	0
24	FW	(England) ENG	David Kamara	9	0	1+5	0	0+1	0	0+0	0	2+0	0
25	MF	(England) ENG	Lewis Warrington	3	0	0+0	0	0+0	0	0+1	0	2+0	0
26	DF	(England) ENG	James Plant	2	0	0+0	0	0+0	0	0+0	0	1+1	0
27	FW	(England) ENG	Sam Mann	2	0	0+0	0	0+0	0	0+0	0	0+2	0
28	DF	(England) ENG	Jack McEvilly	1	0	0+0	0	0+0	0	0+0	0	0+1	0
29	FW	(England) ENG	Dylan Jones	16	7	11+3	6	1+0	0	0+0	0	0+1	1
30	DF	(Wales) WAL	George Nevett	10	0	7+1	0	0+0	0	0+0	0	1+1	0
44	MF	(England) ENG	Ryan Watson	5	0	1+1	0	0+1	0	0+0	0	2+0	0

=== Disciplinary record ===
As of match played 21 November 2026

Includes all competitive matches. The list is sorted by squad number when disciplinary points / points per card / number of cards are equal. Players with no cards not included in the list.

Rank	No.	Pos.	Nat.	Name	League Two			FA Cup			EFL Cup			EFL Trophy			Total			
Rank	No.	Pos.	Nat.	Name	Yellow card	Second yellow card	Red card	Yellow card	Second yellow card	Red card	Yellow card	Second yellow card	Red card	Yellow card	Second yellow card	Red card	Yellow card	Second yellow card	Red card	
1	2	RB	(England)	Joel Senior	2	1	0	0	0	0	1	0	0	0	0	0	3	1	0	
2	3	LB	(Republic of Ireland)	Jacob Slater	4	0	0	0	0	0	0	0	0	0	0	0	4	0	0	
2	16	CB	(England)	Bobby Faulkner	1	0	1	0	0	0	0	0	0	0	0	0	1	0	1	
4	5	CB	(England)	Nathan Smith	3	0	0	0	0	0	0	0	0	0	0	0	3	0	0	
4	6	CDM	(Wales)	Will Vaulks	3	0	0	0	0	0	0	0	0	0	0	0	3	0	0	
4	7	CAM	(England)	Charlie Whitaker	1	0	0	1	0	0	1	0	0	0	0	0	3	0	0	
4	10	RW	(England)	Tom Ince	3	0	0	0	0	0	0	0	0	0	0	0	3	0	0	
8	1	GK	(England)	Luke McGee	2	0	0	0	0	0	0	0	0	0	0	0	2	0	0	
8	4	CB	(England)	Jordan Turnbull	1	0	0	1	0	0	0	0	0	0	0	0	2	0	0	
8	9	CF	(England)	Joe Ironside	2	0	0	0	0	0	0	0	0	0	0	0	2	0	0	
8	11	CM	(England)	Tom Conlon	2	0	0	0	0	0	0	0	0	0	0	0	2	0	0	
8	14	LB	(England)	Olly Scott	0	0	0	1	0	0	0	0	0	1	0	0	2	0	0	
8	15	CM	(Wales)	Jordan Davies	1	0	0	0	0	0	1	0	0	0	0	0	2	0	0	
14	8	CM	(England)	Sam Finley	1	0	0	0	0	0	0	0	0	0	0	0	1	0	0	
14	17	RW	(United States)	Zane Okoro	1	0	0	0	0	0	0	0	0	0	0	0	1	0	0	
14	22	RB	(Republic of Ireland)	Lee O'Connor	1	0	0	0	0	0	0	0	0	0	0	0	1	0	0	
14	29	CF	(England)	Dylan Jones	1	0	0	0	0	0	0	0	0	0	0	0	1	0	0	
14	30	CB	(Wales)	George Nevett	1	0	0	0	0	0	0	0	0	0	0	0	1	0	0	
14	44	CDM	(England)	Ryan Watson	1	0	0	0	0	0	0	0	0	0	0	0	1	0	0	
14	Total					32	1	1	3	0	0	3	0	0	1	0	0	39	1	1

== Awards ==
=== Player awards ===
==== EFL League Two Goal of the Month ====
Month	Player	Opposition	Result	Ref.
October	(Wales) Will Vaulks	v. Barnet	Nominated	

==== PFA League Two Fans' Player of the Month ====
Month	Player	Result	Ref.
October	(Wales) Will Vaulks	Nominated	
