= Bobby Faulkner =

English footballer (born 2004)

Personal information
- Full name: Bobby Brian Faulkner
- Date of birth: 5 August 2004 (age 22)
- Place of birth: Doncaster, England
- Height: 1.86 m (6 ft 1 in)
- Position: Defender

Team information
- Current team: Tranmere Rovers (on loan from Doncaster Rovers)
- Number: 16

Youth career
- –2021: Doncaster Rovers

Senior career*
Years	Team	Apps	(Gls)
2021–	Doncaster Rovers	21	(2)
2022	→ Frickley Athletic (loan)	7	(0)
2023	→ Worksop Town (loan)	2	(0)
2023	→ Spennymoor Town (loan)	5	(0)
2024	→ Dundalk (loan)	4	(0)
2025	→ Buxton (loan)	22	(0)
2025–2026	→ Harrogate Town (loan)	21	(0)
2026–	→ Tranmere Rovers (loan)	2	(0)
- * Club domestic league appearances and goals as of 11:22, 26 August 2026 (UTC)

Bobby Brian Faulkner (born 5 August 2004) is an English professional footballer who plays as a defender for Tranmere Rovers, on loan from EFL League One club Doncaster Rovers.

== Career ==
Faulkner signed his first professional contract for Doncaster Rovers in November 2021. He made his full league debut for Doncaster Rovers in their 1–0 win at Northampton Town in EFL League Two, being named Man of the Match in the process. He scored his first goal in the 2–1 defeat away to Hartlepool United On 1 July 2024, Faulkner signed for League of Ireland Premier Division side Dundalk on loan.

On 17 January 2025, Faulkner joined Buxton on loan for the remainder of the 2024–25 season.

On 2 July 2025, Faulkner joined League Two side Harrogate Town on a season-long loan deal.

On 16 July 2026, Faulkner joined League Two club Tranmere Rovers on loan for the 2026–27 season.

On 22 August 2026, in the 48th minute of an away game at Port Vale, and being 1-0 down, Tranmere's first choice goalkeeper Harrison Male was injured and following a lengthy delay (and in the absence of a substitute goalkeeper), Faulkner was called upon to replace the injured Male. Playing almost the entire second half (including 15 minutes of injury time), Faulkner kept a clean sheet, including several saves and picked up his second Tranmere Rovers fans Player of the Match in only his second game securing legendary status amongst fans after only 2 appearances.
